= Athletics at the 2003 All-Africa Games – Men's 10,000 metres =

The men's 10,000 metres at the 2003 All-Africa Games were held on October 12.

== Results ==
Rank	Name	Nationality	Time	Notes
1st place, gold medalist(s)	Sileshi Sihine	Ethiopia	27:42.13	
2nd place, silver medalist(s)	Gebregziabher Gebremariam	Ethiopia	27:43.12	
3rd place, bronze medalist(s)	Dejene Berhanu	Ethiopia	27:47.19	
4	Boniface Toroitich Kiprop	Uganda	27:53.37	
5	Moses Mosop	Kenya	27:56.56	
6	Sammy Kipketer	Kenya	28:03.51	
7	Gilbert Okari	Kenya	28:04.88	
8	Dieudonné Disi	Rwanda	28:37.69	
9	Tau Khotso	Lesotho	30:08.25	
10	Teklemariam Mered	Eritrea	30:16.84	
	Dieudonné Gahungu	Burundi	DNS	
	Pascal Ntahokaraja	Burundi	DNS	
	Benny Degoto-Gloum	Central African Republic	DNS	
	Fabian Joseph	Tanzania	DNS	
	Martin Sulle	Tanzania	DNS	
