= 2004 World Junior Championships in Athletics – Men's 10,000 metres =

Event at the 2004 World Junior Championships

The men's 10,000 metres event at the 2004 World Junior Championships in Athletics was held in Grosseto, Italy, at Stadio Olimpico Carlo Zecchini on 14 July.

== Medalists ==
Gold	Boniface Kiprop; Uganda
Silver	Fabiano Joseph; Tanzania
Bronze	Ryuji Ono; Japan

== Results ==
=== Final ===
14 July

Rank	Name	Nationality	Time	Notes
1st place, gold medalist(s)	Boniface Kiprop	Uganda	28:03.77	
2nd place, silver medalist(s)	Fabiano Joseph	Tanzania	28:04.45	
3rd place, bronze medalist(s)	Ryuji Ono	Japan	28:30.45	
4	Hosea Macharinyang	Kenya	28:36.50	
5	Abera Chane	Ethiopia	28:46.99	
6	Moses Aliwa	Uganda	28:53.75	
7	Hidekazu Sato	Japan	29:02.03	
8	Jean Pierre Mvuyekure	Rwanda	29:03.73	
9	Yevgeniy Rybakov	Russia	29:25.77	
10	Moses Masai	Kenya	29:32.48	
11	Willy Nduwimana	Burundi	29:34.31	
12	Valens Bivahagumye	Rwanda	29:35.41	
13	Eric Niyonsaba	Burundi	29:37.55	
14	Gebo Burka	Ethiopia	30:12.85	
15	Mario Van Wayenberghe	Belgium	30:26.69	
16	John Cusi	Peru	30:28.05	
17	João Stingelin	Brazil	30:43.53	
18	László Tóth	Hungary	31:12.73	
19	Keith Bechtol	United States	31:45.99	
20	Sergey Trokhymenko	Ukraine	32:15.44	
	Daniele Meucci	Italy	DNF	
	James Hower	United States	DNF	
	Leonardo Trezo	Mexico	DNF	
	Gert Van Poucke	Belgium	DNF	
	Nkosinoxolo Sonqibido	South Africa	DNF	

== Participation ==
According to an unofficial count, 25 athletes from 17 countries participated in the event.

- Belgium (2)
- Brazil (1)
- Burundi (2)
- Ethiopia (2)
- Hungary (1)
- Italy (1)
- Japan (2)
- Kenya (2)
- Mexico (1)
- Peru (1)
- Russia (1)
- Rwanda (2)
- South Africa (1)
- Tanzania (1)
- Uganda (2)
- Ukraine (1)
- United States (2)
