= Zersenay Tadese =

Eritrean long-distance runner (born 1982)

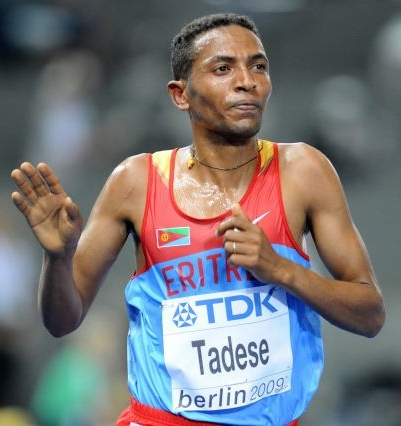
- Zersenay at the 2009 World Championships

Personal information
- Nationality: Eritrean
- Born: 8 February 1982 (age 44) Adi Bana, Ethiopia
- Height: 1.60 m (5 ft 3 in)
- Weight: 54.431 kg (120 lb) (2023)

Sport
- Sport: Athletics
- Events: 10,000 metres, half marathon

Achievements and titles
- Personal bests: 3000 m: 7:39.93; 2-mile: 8:19.34; 5000 m: 12:59.27; 10,000 m: 26:37.25; Half marathon: 58:23; Marathon: 2:08:46
Medal record
Representing Eritrea
Olympic Games
Bronze medal – third place	2004 Athens	10,000 m
World Championships
Silver medal – second place	2009 Berlin	10,000 m
World Cross Country Championships
Gold medal – first place	2007 Mombasa	Senior race
Silver medal – second place	2006 Fukuoka	Long team
Silver medal – second place	2005 Saint-Etienne	Long race
Bronze medal – third place	2009 Amman	Senior race
Bronze medal – third place	2009 Amman	Senior team
Bronze medal – third place	2008 Edinburgh	Senior race
Bronze medal – third place	2004 Brussels	Long team
World Half Marathon Championships
Gold medal – first place	2012 Kavarna	Individual
Gold medal – first place	2009 Birmingham	Individual
Gold medal – first place	2008 Rio de Janeiro	Individual
Gold medal – first place	2007 Udine	Individual
Gold medal – first place	2006 Debrecen (20km)	Individual
Silver medal – second place	2010 Nanning	Individual
All-Africa Games
Gold medal – first place	2007 Algiers	10,000 m
Gold medal – first place	2015 Brazzaville	Half Marathon

Zersenay Tadese Habtesilase^{[nb]} (Tigrinya: ዘርእሰናይ ታደሰ; born 8 February 1982) is an Eritrean former long-distance track and road running athlete. He held the men's half marathon world record from 2010 to 2018. His bronze medal in the 10,000 metres at the 2004 Athens Olympics made him the first ever Eritrean Olympic medallist, and his 20-km title at the 2006 IAAF World Road Running Championships also made him the country's first athlete to win at a world championship event. He does not use a sprint finish to win races; his strategy relies on a combination of efficient running and fast pace setting.

Zersenay ("Tadese" is his father's name) has found most of his success in the half marathon, with four consecutive victories in the World Half Marathon Championships from 2006 to 2009 (with a 2006 20 km edition), a silver medal in 2010 and a fifth title in 2012. His 5 titles are a record. He set a world record at the Lisbon Half Marathon in 2010.

He has also excelled in cross country running, winning a gold, a silver, and two bronze medals in the long-distance race over five IAAF World Cross Country Championships. He is a four-time Olympian (2004, 2008, 2012 and 2016).

In 2009, Zersenay became only the second man (after Paul Tergat) to win three World Championship medals over three different surfaces in the same year, winning World Cross Country bronze, 10,000 metres World Championship silver on the track, and gold in road running at the World Half Marathon Championships. He is a popular public figure in his home country; 2500 guests attended his wedding to Merhawit Solomon, which was broadcast live on Eritrean television. His brother, Kidane Tadese, is also a professional distance runner.

In 2016, he was chosen to be part of Nike's Breaking2 team to try to break 2 hours for the marathon and finished in 2:06:51.

== Career ==
=== Early life ===
Zersenay Tadese was born in Adi Bana, and had a peaceful, rural upbringing with his six siblings, largely avoiding the troubles of the Eritrean War of Independence. He became interested in cycling in his teenage years and, after winning a number of races, he set his sights upon becoming a professional cyclist in Europe. However, the races of 30–50 km fell short of the distances needed to compete on the European circuit and he was ill-prepared for a transition to top-level cycling.

He was a relative late-comer to competitive running: in his late teens, scouts from a local athletics club suggested that his cycling stamina might translate to running and invited him to compete. He won the race and was spurred on by the victory to start taking the sport seriously and focus on running. Zersenay was adamant that his early years in cycling had given him a firm foundation for endurance running.

His first foray into the international athletics circuit came in 2002, when he attended the 2002 IAAF World Cross Country Championships in Dublin. Although he was wearing ill-fitting shoes and was somewhat puzzled at hearing a starting gun for the first time, he managed to finish in 30th place with a time of 36 minutes and 37 seconds. However, he remained some distance off the winner Kenenisa Bekele. He competed at his first IAAF World Half Marathon Championships in May of that year, finishing just outside the top twenty runners with a time of 1:03:05. He competed on the track at the African Athletics Championships, taking sixth place in the 10,000 metres race in Radès, Tunisia, rounding off a modest debut year.

The 2003 season saw Zersenay establish himself as an emerging force in cross country: he broke into the top ten at the 2003 IAAF World Cross Country Championships, and finished in the top three in all of his six races in Europe that winter. A 5000 metres win at the KBC Night of Athletics brought Zersenay an Eritrean record of 13:11.07, and a place at the IAAF World Championships in Athletics. At the 2003 World Championships, he improved his record further to 13:05.57 and finished in eighth place in the 5000 metres final. More improvements came at the World Half Marathon Championships in Vilamoura, Portugal, where he recorded a personal best of 1:01:26 to finish in seventh position.

=== Olympic medalist ===
The 2004 season represented a breakthrough for Zersenay and he established himself as a serious contender in distance running. He signed a contract with Adidas Spain and brought the team victory at the European Clubs' Cross Country Cup in February. The following month he bettered his previous showings at the World Cross Country Championships with a sixth-place finish. With the help of teammates Yonas Kifle and Tesfayohannes Mesfen, among others, he took Eritrea to third position in the team competition – the first time the country had reached the podium at a world cross country event. Two months later he finished second in the 10 km Great Manchester Run; his time of 27:59 was five seconds behind winner Craig Mottram. He took to the track in June at a meeting in Gavà, Spain, and recorded another national record, this time in the 10,000 m with a time of 27:32.61.

The peak of his season came at the 2004 Athens Olympics, where he became the first person in Eritrean sporting history to win an Olympic medal. Zersenay took the bronze in the 10,000 metres at the 2004 Summer Olympics in Athens, Greece behind Kenenisa Bekele, and Sileshi Sihine. His performance of 27:22.57 represented a dramatic improvement as he had beaten his previous best by ten seconds, despite unfavourably hot conditions. Zersenay refused to politicise his medal win behind his Ethiopian counterparts, stating: "we have always been friends with the Ethiopians. Now we are a nation...I can say I am very happy." The Eritrean-born runner Meb Keflezighi, representing the United States, won silver in the marathon a few days later, highlighting the country's improving standards. Zersenay finished his first Olympics by reaching another event final: he took seventh place in the men's 5000 metres race, confirming his position as a world-class runner.

He opened 2005 with a second win in the European Clubs' Cross Country Cup. He won his first World Cross Country Championship medal soon after, finishing second to Bekele to take silver at the 2005 edition. On the track, he recorded a 5000 m personal best of at the Qatar Grand Prix in Doha, and qualified to compete at the World Championships in both the 5000 and 10,000 m. At the 2005 World Championships, he broke the national record in the 10,000 m final, but his time of 27:12.82 was only enough for sixth. The 5000 m final held little reprieve for the Eritrean as he finished in second last position. He ended the season on a positive note, however, improving his 10,000 m best to 27:04.70 at the Memorial Van Damme, and winning the Great North Run with a world best time of 59:05 – which was only his second outing over the half marathon distance.

=== Road and cross country world champion ===
Zersenay failed to make the podium for a second time at the 2006 World Cross Country Championships, but his fourth-place finish headed the Eritrean team towards silver medal in the team competition. The following month, Zersenay overcame both Fabiano Joseph and Boniface Kiprop to win the Great Manchester Run. He sprinted to the line with a finishing time of 27:36; an Eritrean record and the second fastest that year. In August that year, he significantly improved his 10,000 m best at Memorial Van Damme; his time of 26:37.25 knocked almost thirty seconds off his previous mark to make him the 8th fastest person ever, but he still finished behind the emerging Micah Kogo who ran the tenth fastest ever time. A new best of 59:16 by Zersenay at the Rotterdam Half Marathon equalled Samuel Wanjiru's course record and boded well for the upcoming championship race.

He scored a striking victory at the 2006 IAAF World Road Running Championships in Debrecen, Hungary, finishing the 20 km race in 56:01 – a time which was second only to Haile Gebrselassie's world record and was forty seconds faster than the silver medallist Robert Kipchumba. It was first time that an Eritrean had won a major world title in sport. As Zersenay did not possess a strong sprint finish (crucial for success on the track) commentators suggested that a move to the marathon distance seemed an obvious career progression, but he downplayed the idea, stating that he would not change distances in the near future. He closed the season with a run at the New Year's Eve 10 km road race: the San Silvestre Vallecana in Madrid. Zersenay and Eliud Kipchoge were awarded the same time of 26:54, but Kipchoge was announced as the race winner. Although this was faster than Haile Gebrselassie's world record of 27:02 at the time, it was not ratifiable as the runners benefited from the race's downhill circuit.

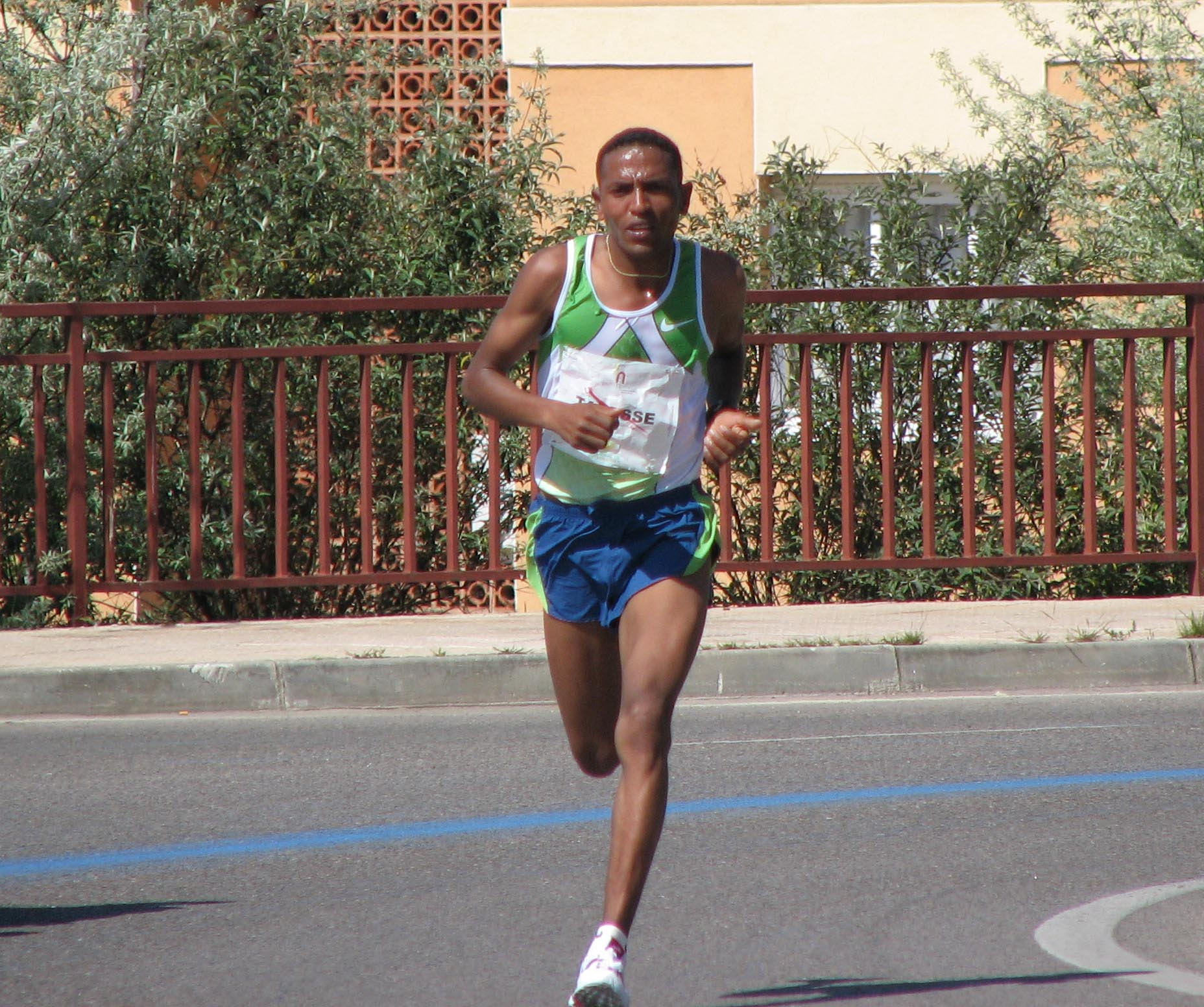
Zersenay running in the Cáceres Half Marathon in 2007

The 2007 season brought Zersenay his greatest medal haul, as he succeeded on grass, track and road. For the first time in his career he overcame all opposition, including five-time champion Kenenisa Bekele, to become the 2007 World Cross Country Champion. The hot conditions in Mombasa forced a number of runners out of the race, but Zersenay maintained his pace to finish over twenty seconds ahead of the next runner. At the Cáceres Half Marathon, he stated his intention to try for the world record and, although he won the race, poor pacing left him some distance from a record time. He returned to the Great Manchester Run and again improved his best, recording 27:24, but this was not enough to beat Micah Kogo who won in a UK all-comers record time. He competed at the Prefontaine Classic for the first time, and set a two miles best of 8:19.34, although he was some distance behind winner Craig Mottram.

The 2007 All-Africa Games represented a double landmark victory for Zersenay: he became the first Eritrean medallist in the competition's history, and won his first ever gold medal on the track, sealing victory in the 10,000 m final with a Games record time of 27:00.30. The following month he competed at the 2007 World Championships in Athletics, and he edged closer to a podium finish – he led the 10,000 m race up to the 8 km mark, setting a fast pace, but ultimately ended up in fourth position. Preparing for the road championships that year, he ran the 10-mile Dam tot Damloop race in September and won in 45:51 (the world's fastest that season), finishing some distance ahead of runners up Bernard Kipyego and James Rotich. Zersenay emphasised his position as one of the world's most dominant half marathon runners with a second victory at the 2007 IAAF World Road Running Championships in Udine, Italy. Although he was close to world record pace at the 15 km point, he slowed behind the leading pack of Makau Musyoki, Evans Kiprop Cheruiyot and Deriba Merga. In the final kilometre, he burst away to take the lead and the gold medal, setting a national and championship record time of 58:59 in the process. Following these achievements, a medical team did a study of his running economy and found him to be one of the most efficient runners ever to be tested.

=== World Half Marathon champion ===
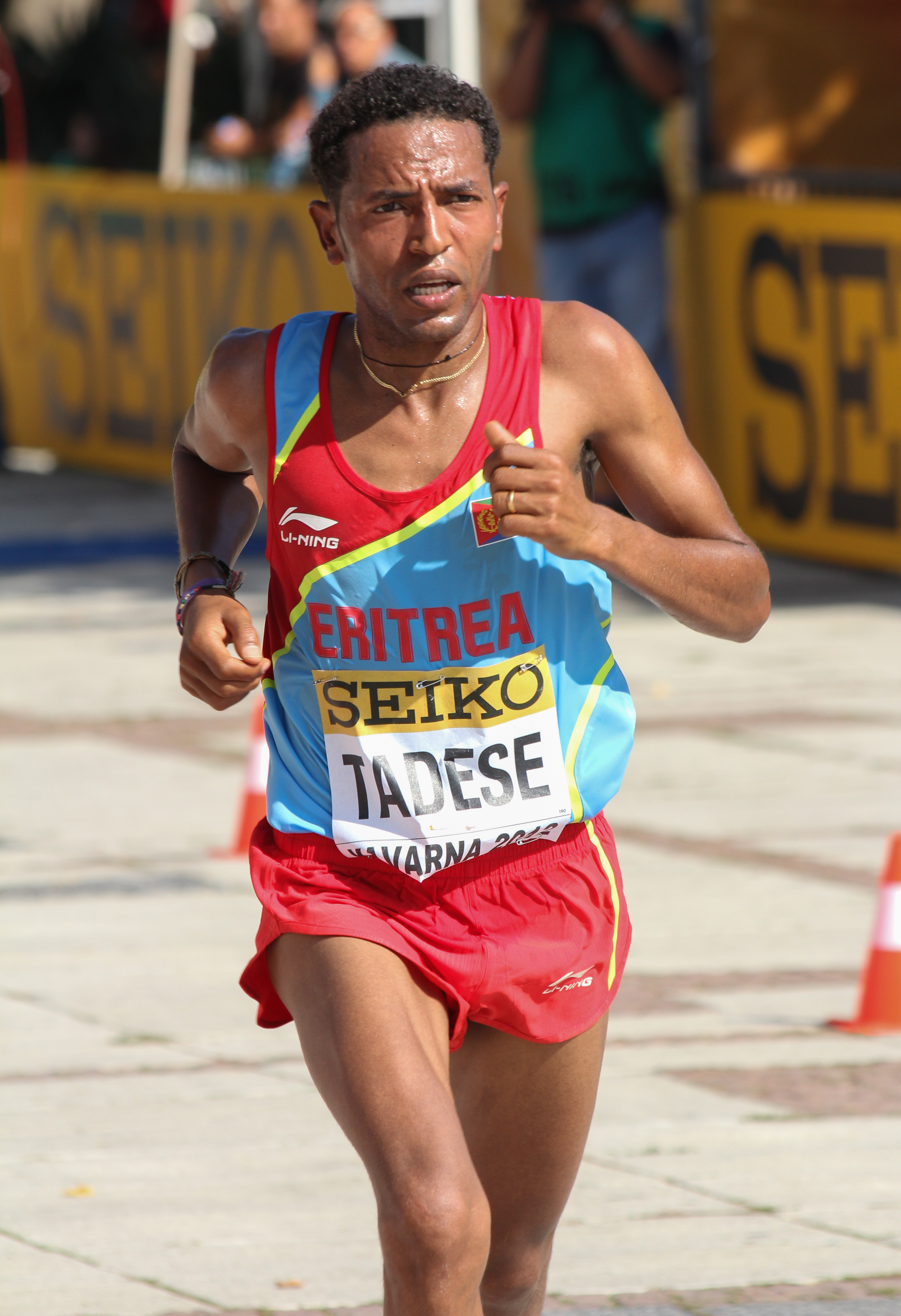
Zersenay Tadese at the 2012 World Half Marathon Championships in Kavarna, Bulgaria

Bekele was keen to regain his cross country title from Zersenay and the 2008 cross country season was a competitive one. At the Great Edinburgh International Cross Country race, Zersenay was pipped by the Ethiopian at the line, finishing just one second behind. The following month, Zersenay beat Eliud Kipchoge to win the Cinque Mulini race in the buildup to the 2008 IAAF World Cross Country Championships. On the day of the Championship race in Edinburgh, Scotland, Zersenay took the lead early on and set a strong pace at the mid-race point. However, near the finish Bekele and Kenyan Leonard Komon surged ahead to leave Zersenay as the bronze medallist.

A win at the World 10K Bangalore, where he beat Moses Kipsiro in 27:51, was the highlight of a low-key build up to the 2008 Beijing Olympics. In August, Zersenay was among some forty runners competing for the medals in the 10,000 metres Olympic final. Zersenay's brother, Kidane, was also competing and he led for most of first half of what was a quick race. Zersenay Tadese had the lead at the 7–8000 m mark but Bekele and Sihine sprinted into first and second. Although Zersenay's time almost equalled the previous Olympic record for the event, he ended up one second behind Kenyans Moses Masai and Micah Kogo, taking fifth place overall.

After the Olympics, Zersenay returned to Eritrea and trained for one month to prepare for the 2008 World Half Marathon Championships in Rio de Janeiro. He won his third consecutive title over the half marathon distance with ease, taking the lead early on and beating the second-placed Patrick Makau Musyoki by almost two minutes. His success caused much celebration in his home country, so much so that the President of Eritrea greeted him at the airport upon his return. With a strong history in the half marathon, Zersenay announced he would try the full marathon distance the following season.

Zersenay took third place at the 2009 IAAF World Cross Country Championships in a closely contested race, finishing just behind a resurgent Gebregziabher Gebremariam and Ugandan runner Moses Kipsiro. He competed in his first ever full-length marathon in April, signing up for the London Marathon. His first appearance over the distance was much anticipated following his cross country and track success, but he could not finish the race, pulling out around the 35 km mark.

He rebounded, however, taking silver in the 10,000 metres at the 2009 World Championships in Athletics, finishing behind Kenenisa Bekele. Zersenay had led for a large part of the race, setting a fast pace, but he was beaten to the gold by Bekele's sprint finish. Following this, he won his third World Half Marathon title, setting a Championship record of 59:35 and also winning a silver medal with Eritrea in the team competition. The gold medal over the half marathon distance made him the second runner ever to win a World Championship medal in cross country, track and road racing all in the same year, a feat achieved previously by only Paul Tergat.

=== Half marathon world record ===
Zersenay's first road race of 2010 was the Lisbon Half Marathon. The organisers had modified the course and assembled a field of fast runners in order to facilitate a quick race. Despite the top five athletes all running personal best times, Zersenay was alone at the very front from 10 km onwards. He fell four seconds short of the 15 km world record, but significantly revised Haile Gebrselassie's four-year-old 20 km world mark to 55:21, beating it by almost half a minute. Samuel Wanjiru's half marathon world record was next to fall as Zersenay crossed the line at 58:23 minutes, a clear ten seconds ahead of the previous mark.

He managed to finish his first full-marathon at the 2010 London Marathon, although his time of 2:12:03 for seventh place was not as strong a transition as expected. He made his first appearance at the Giro di Castelbuono in Sicily in July and, although he described the course as "very hard", he won the race ahead of Samuel Wanjiru. He attempted for yet another title at the 2010 IAAF World Half Marathon Championships, but Wilson Kiprop brought an end to his four-year reign – the Eritrean took the silver medal, labouring towards the end and pulling up in injured at the line. He was still suffering from the injury at the San Silvestre Vallecana some two months later, although he managed to beat Ayad Lamdassem to win the race.

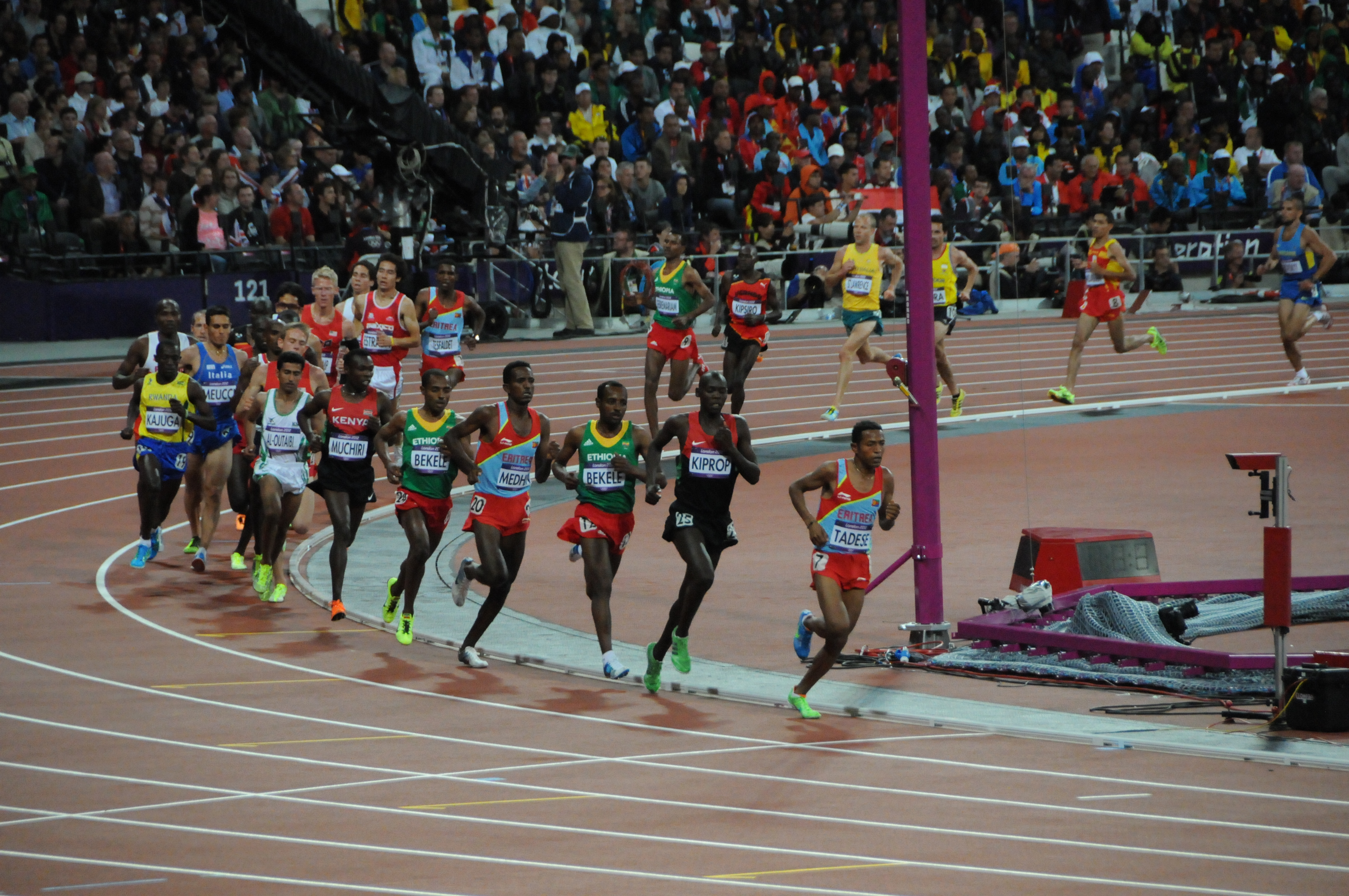
Zersenay leading the 10,000 metres final at the 2012 London Olympics

He was at full strength at the 2011 Lisbon Half Marathon: he missed his world record mark but ran the second fastest of all-time (58:30 minutes). In the outdoor track season he ran 26:51.09 minutes for the 10,000 m at the Prefontaine Classic and came close to a personal best with a win at the Barcelona Meeting with a time of 12:59.32 minutes. Making his fourth consecutive appearance in the event, he took fourth place in the men's 10,000 m at the 2011 World Championships in Athletics. He ended the year with road wins at the Porto Half Marathon and the São Silvestre de Luanda, setting course records of 59:30 minutes and 27:44 minutes, respectively.

At the 2012 World's Best 10K he came third, beaten by Sammy Kitwara and Vincent Chepkok. He won the Lisbon Half Marathon for the third straight year, but was slower than previous times (59:34) due to warm conditions and having the flu. A run at the 2012 London Marathon saw him perform better than he did in 2010, but he lost touch with the leading pack after the halfway point and came fourteenth with a time of 2:10:41 hours. He was chosen as Eritrea's flag bearer at the 2012 London Olympics and ran in the 10,000 metres final. He set the pace early on in the race but was defeated in the sprint finish, finishing in sixth place some three seconds behind the winner Mo Farah. After the Olympics he ran at the 2012 World Half Marathon Championships. He dominated the race from just beyond the 5 km point, and won it convincingly in a time of 1:00:19 hours, 32 seconds ahead of the runner-up, Deressa Chimsa. Only two weeks later he entered the Great Birmingham Run, but he appeared tired and finished third in a race where the top three all dipped under Haile Gebrselassie's course record.

=== 2013–19 seasons ===
Zersenay managed only seventh at the World's Best 10K in February but returned to the top of the podium in his speciality at the Prague Half Marathon, edging out his training partner Amanuel Mesel with a time of 60:10. He clocked another win over the distance at the Gifu Seiryu Half Marathon, beating the defending champion Martin Mathathi and setting a course record of 60:31 minutes. In October, he attempted to run the Chicago Marathon, but dropped out shortly after the halfway point. He did not compete again until February 2014, when he won at the small Cáceres cross country in Spain.

At the 2016 Olympics in Rio he competed in the final of the 10,000 m finishing 8th in a time of 27.23.

He won 18 out of 29 half Marathons he raced.

In 2019, he competed in the men's marathon at the 2019 World Athletics Championships held in Doha, Qatar. He finished in 6th place.

== Personal life ==
A quietly spoken athlete, he frequently states that his victories are a tribute to his country. Eritrea is one of Africa's newest and least populous countries, and Zersenay's achievements on the world athletics stage have made him one of the country's most identifiable sportsmen. He is a popular public figure in his home country; 2500 guests attended his wedding to Merhawit Solomon, which was broadcast live on Eritrean television. His brother, Kidane Tadese, is also a professional distance runner who has competed at the World Cross Country Championships and the 2008 Summer Olympics.

== Personal bests ==
Surface	Event	Time (m:s)	Venue	Date
Track	3000 m	7:39.93	Doha, Qatar	13 May 2005
Track	Two miles	8:19.34	Eugene, Oregon, United States	10 June 2007
Track	5000 m	12:59.27	Rome, Italy	14 July 2006
Track	10,000 m	26:37.25	Brussels, Belgium	25 August 2006
Road	10 km	27:24	Manchester, England	20 May 2007
Road	15 km	41:34+	Udine, Italy	14 October 2007
Road	20 km	55:21+	Lisbon, Portugal	21 March 2010
Road	Half marathon	58:23	Lisbon, Portugal	21 March 2010
Road	Marathon	2:08:46	Berlin, Germany	16 September 2018

- All information taken from IAAF profile.

== Major competition record ==
Year	Competition	Venue	Position	Event	Notes
Representing Eritrea
2002	World Cross Country Championships	Dublin, Ireland	30th	12 km	36:37
2002	World Half Marathon Championships	Brussels, Belgium	21st	Half Marathon	1:03:05
2002	African Championships	Radès, Tunisia	6th	10,000 m	28:47.29
2003	World Cross Country Championships	Lausanne, Switzerland	9th	12 km	37:10
2003	World Championships	Paris, France	8th	5000 m	13:05.57
2003	World Half Marathon Championships	Vilamoura, Portugal	7th	Half marathon	1:01:26
2004	World Cross Country Championships	Brussels, Belgium	6th	12 km	36:37
2004	Olympic Games	Athens, Greece	3rd	10,000 m	27:22.57
2004	Olympic Games	Athens, Greece	7th	5000 m	13:24.31
2005	World Cross Country Championships	Saint-Étienne, France	2nd	12 km	35:20
2005	World Championships	Helsinki, Finland	14th	5000 m	13:40.27
2005	World Championships	Helsinki, Finland	6th	10,000 m	27:12.82
2006	World Cross Country Championships	Fukuoka, Japan	4th	12 km	35:47
2006	World Road Running Championships	Debrecen, Hungary	1st	20 km	56:01
2007	World Cross Country Championships	Mombasa, Kenya	1st	12 km	35:50
2007	All-Africa Games	Algiers, Algeria	1st	10,000 m	27:00.30 GR
2007	World Championships	Osaka, Japan	4th	10,000 m	27:21.37
2007	World Road Running Championships	Udine, Italy	1st	Half marathon	58:59
2008	World Cross Country Championships	Edinburgh, Scotland	3rd	12 km	34:43
2008	Olympic Games	Beijing, China	5th	10,000 m	27:05.11
2008	World Half Marathon Championships	Rio de Janeiro, Brazil	1st	Half marathon	59:56
2009	World Cross Country Championships	Amman, Jordan	3rd	12 km	35:04
2009	World Championships	Berlin, Germany	2nd	10,000 m	26:50.12
2009	World Half Marathon Championships	Birmingham, England	1st	Half marathon	59:35
2010	Lisbon Half Marathon	Lisbon, Portugal	1st	Half marathon	58:23 WR
2010	World Half Marathon Championships	Nanning, China	2nd	Half marathon	1:00:11
2011	World Championships	Daegu, South Korea	4th	10,000 m	27:22.57
2012	Olympic Games	London, England	6th	10,000 m	27:33.51
2012	World Half Marathon Championships	Kavarna, Bulgaria	1st	Half Marathon	1:00:19
2016	Olympic Games	Rio de Janeiro, Brazil	8th	10,000 m	27:23.86
2019	World Championships	Doha, Qatar	6th	Marathon	2:11:29

== Notes ==
- ^{nb} Early in his career, his name was often reported as Zersenay Tadesse, with the letter "s" appearing twice in the last name. The athlete has since clarified that this is incorrect and it is correctly spelt with a single "s" in the surname. Tadese is his father's first name – see Habesha naming system.

Records
Preceded by (Kenya) Samuel Wanjiru	Men's half marathon world record holder 21 March 2010 – 15 September 2019	Succeeded by (Kenya) Geoffrey Kamworor
Preceded by Haile Gebrselassie	Men's 20 kilometres world record holder 21 March 2010 – present	Succeeded by Incumbent
Sporting positions
Preceded by Dejene Berhanu	Men's Great North Run winner 2005	Succeeded by Hendrick Ramaala
Preceded by Dejene Berhanu; Patrick Makau Musyoki	Men's half marathon best year performance 2005; 2010–2011	Succeeded by Haile Gebrselassie; Atsedu Tsegay
Preceded by Samuel Wanjiru	Rotterdam men's half marathon winner 2006	Succeeded by Evans Kiprop Cheruiyot
Preceded by Sileshi Sihine	Men's 10,000 m All-African Games winner 2007	Succeeded by Ibrahim Jeilan
Preceded by Francis Kibiwott	Men's Dam tot Damloop winner 2007	Succeeded by Sammy Kitwara
