= 2003 World Championships in Athletics – Men's 10,000 metres =

The men's 10,000 metres event featured at the 2003 World Championships in Athletics in Paris, France. The final was held on 24 August 2003.

At this point in time, Haile Gebrselassie was the #1 distance runner in the world, with two successive Olympic titles and four World Championships at 10,000. He also held the 5-year-old world record plus the world record at 5,000 metres. A poor race at the previous World Championships was the first sign of his lack of total dominance, now the 30 year old had a challenger from near his home town, who also ran with an almost identical, efficient running form, 21 year old Kenenisa Bekele. As Gebrselassie ran a strong race trying to burn off his new rival, the rest of the world's best runners, including five Kenyan born athletes, disappeared in their wake. The last to hold on to the lead group was Sileshi Sihine, assuring an Ethiopian sweep, but the championship was in doubt. Bekele remained as Gebrselassie's twin shadow until he made one move with 200 metres to go. Gebrselassie's ever powerful sprint was no match for Bekele. Over the final straightaway, Bekele extended to more than a full second gap for the victory and the changing of the guard in dominance of long-distance track running. Bekele took the prize at the next Olympics over Sihine with Gebrselassie out of the money and accomplished the Woolworth double (5 and 10) in 2008. Gebrselassie subsequently focused his effort onto 10k, half-marathon and marathon competitions, setting multiple world records before retiring.

== Final ranking ==
This was the first time anyone ran under 27 minutes at these championships.

RANK	ATHLETE	TIME
	Kenenisa Bekele (ETH)	26:49.57; CR
	Haile Gebrselassie (ETH)	26:50.77
	Sileshi Sihine (ETH)	27:01.44
4.	Ahmad Hassan Abdullah (QAT)	27:18.28
5.	John Cheruiyot Korir (KEN)	27:19.94
6.	Wilberforce Talel (KEN)	27:33.60
7.	Charles Kamathi (KEN)	27:45.05
8.	Kamiel Maase (NED)	27:45.46
9.	Karl Keska (GBR)	27:47.89
10.	Ismaïl Sghyr (FRA)	27:54.87
11.	David Galván (MEX)	27:55.31
12.	John Yuda Msuri (TAN)	27:56.21
13.	Fabiano Joseph Naasi (TAN)	28:06.36
14.	Alan Culpepper (USA)	28:14.92
15.	Teodoro Vega (MEX)	28:31.71
16.	Mebrahtom Keflezighi (USA)	28:35.08
17.	Cathal Lombard (IRL)	28:36.43
18.	Tomoo Tsubota (JPN)	28:37.10
19.	Dan Browne (USA)	29:01.60
—	Salim Kipsang (KEN)	DNF
—	Michael Aish (NZL)	DNF
—	Dieter Baumann (GER)	DNF
—	José Manuel Martínez (ESP)	DNS

== See also ==
- Athletics at the 2003 Pan American Games - Men's 10000 metres
