= 2011 World Championships in Athletics – Men's 10,000 metres =

Official Video

The Men's 10,000 metres at the 2011 World Championships in Athletics was held at the Daegu Stadium on August 28. There were twenty entrants, with nineteen athletes from twelve countries starting the race.

Mo Farah had been undefeated over the distance that year and his European record of 26:46.57 minutes topped the season's rankings. Eritrea's Zersenay Tadese and Ethiopians Imane Merga and Sileshi Sihine were other entrants ranked in the top six. Kenenisa Bekele, the unbeaten world champion since 2003, decided to defend his title, but his form was unknown as injuries had meant that he had not raced since early 2010. Kenya, typically strong in the event, sent a team of 2007 bronze medallist Martin Mathathi, Peter Cheruiyot Kirui, and World Cross Country runner-up Paul Kipngetich Tanui.

Zersenay Tadese set a fast pace for much of the race, a decision which soon reduced the leading pack to the Ethiopian and Kenyan teams, with the additions of the Eritrean, Mo Farah, and Galen Rupp. Kenenisa Bekele dropped out at the halfway point, unable to match the leading pace. The final 500 metres saw Farah take the lead with an injection of speed, with Imane Merga and Ibrahim Jeilan the only runners to follow him. Farah appeared to have judged the race well, having led at the bell for the final 400 m and completing his last lap in 53.36 seconds. However, Ibrahim Jeilan was even faster and overtook Farah in the final metres of the straight, taking the gold by a margin of less than 0.3 seconds. Imane Merga claimed the bronze five seconds later and Zersenay Tadese and Martin Mathathi came fourth and fifth.

Ibrahim Jeilan, the 2006 World Junior Champion, was an unexpected winner and Farah later remarked that he had never heard of him. Having felt overlooked for the Ethiopian team for the 2008 Olympics and 2009 World Championships, Ibrahim had moved to Japan to prepare himself away from the major circuit. It was the fifth consecutive time that an Ethiopian athlete had won the world title. Although Farah was the runner-up, he ran the second fastest time ever by a British athlete and became the country's first ever men's medallist in the event. Imane Merga's bronze was his first ever world medal on the track.

== Medalists ==
Gold	Silver	Bronze
Ibrahim Jeilan; Ethiopia	Mo Farah; Great Britain & N.I.	Imane Merga; Ethiopia

== Records ==
Prior to the competition, the following world and championship records were as follows.

World record	Kenenisa Bekele (ETH)	26:17.53	Brussels, Belgium	26 August 2005
Championship record	Kenenisa Bekele (ETH)	26:46.31	Berlin, Germany	17 August 2009
World leading	Mo Farah (GBR)	26:46.57	Eugene, United States	3 June 2011
African record	Kenenisa Bekele (ETH)	26:17.53	Brussels, Belgium	26 August 2005
Asian record	Ahmad Hassan Abdullah (QAT)	26:38.76	Brussels, Belgium	5 September 2003
North, Central American and Caribbean record	Chris Solinsky (USA)	26:59.60	Palo Alto, United States	1 May 2010
South American record	Marílson Gomes dos Santos (BRA)	27:28.12	Neerpelt, Belgium	2 June 2007
European record	Mo Farah (GBR)	26:46.57	Eugene, United States	3 June 2011
Oceanian record	Ben St.Lawrence (AUS)	27:24.95	Palo Alto, United States	1 May 2010

== Qualification standards ==
A time	B time
27:40.00	28:00.00

== Schedule ==
Date	Time	Round
August 28, 2011	19:30	Final

== Results ==
KEY:	q	Fastest non-qualifiers	Q	Qualified	NR	National record	PB	Personal best	SB	Seasonal best

=== Final ===
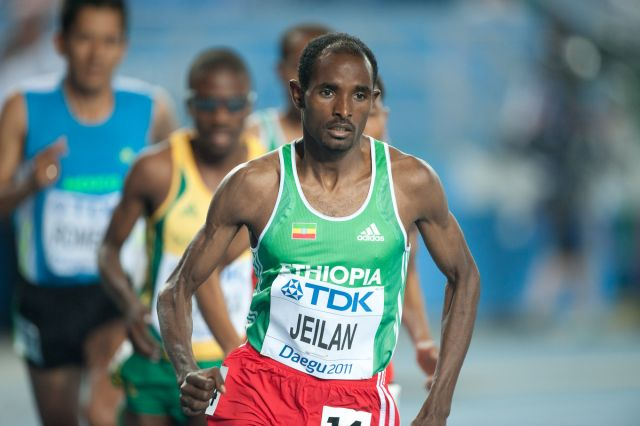
Ibrahim Jeilan en route to his 2011 world title

Rank	Name	Nationality	Time	Notes
1st place, gold medalist(s)	Ibrahim Jeilan	Ethiopia	27:13.81	
2nd place, silver medalist(s)	Mo Farah	Great Britain & N.I.	27:14.07	
3rd place, bronze medalist(s)	Imane Merga	Ethiopia	27:19.14	
4	Zersenay Tadese	Eritrea	27:22.57	
5	Martin Mathathi	Kenya	27:23.87	
6	Peter Cheruiyot Kirui	Kenya	27:25.63	PB
7	Galen Rupp	United States	27:26.84	SB
8	Sileshi Sihine	Ethiopia	27:34.11	
9	Paul Kipngetich Tanui	Kenya	27:54.03	
10	Matt Tegenkamp	United States	28:41.62	
11	Rui Silva	Portugal	28:48.62	
12	Daniele Meucci	Italy	28:50.28	
13	Stephen Mokoka	South Africa	28:51.97	
14	Scott Bauhs	United States	29:03.92	
15	Yuki Sato	Japan	29:04.15	
16	Juan Carlos Romero	Mexico	29:38.38	
	Ali Hasan Mahboob	Bahrain	DNF	
	Bayron Piedra	Ecuador	DNF	
	Kenenisa Bekele	Ethiopia	DNF	
	Teklemariam Medhin	Eritrea	DNS	
