= List of medal sweeps at the World Athletics Championships =

A podium sweep in athletics is when one team wins all available medals in a single event in a sporting event. At the highest level, that would be when one nation wins all the medals in an athletics event at the World Championships in Athletics. In athletics the maximum number of entrants from a single country in most events is three, allowing in theory for athletes from the same country to finish in all three top places.

== Men ==
Carl Lewis has been a part of four American sweeps. Kenya has swept the 3000 metres steeplechase three times, with Ezekiel Kemboi and Brimin Kipruto a part of two of them.

Championships	Event	Country	Gold		Silver		Bronze		Ref
Championships	Event	Country	Athlete	Result	Athlete	Result	Athlete	Result	Ref
1983 Helsinki	100 m	United States (USA)	Carl Lewis	10.07	Calvin Smith	10.21	Emmit King	10.24	
1983 Helsinki	Long jump	United States (USA)	Carl Lewis	8.55	Jason Grimes	8.29	Mike Conley	8.12	
1991 Tokyo	100 m	United States (USA)	Carl Lewis	9.86 WR	Leroy Burrell	9.88	Dennis Mitchell	9.91	
1991 Tokyo	Long jump	United States (USA)	Mike Powell	8.95 WR	Carl Lewis	8.91	Larry Myricks	8.42	
1997 Athens	3000 m st.	Kenya (KEN)	Wilson Boit Kipketer	8:05.84	Moses Kiptanui	8:06.04	Bernard Barmasai	8:06.04	
2001 Edmonton	20 km walk	Russia (RUS)	Roman Rasskazov	1:20:31	Ilya Markov	1:20:33	Viktor Burayev	1:20:36	
2003 Paris	10,000 m	Ethiopia (ETH)	Kenenisa Bekele	26:49.57 CR	Haile Gebrselassie	26:50.77	Sileshi Sihine	27:01.44	
2005 Helsinki	200 m	United States (USA)	Justin Gatlin	20.04	Wallace Spearmon	20.20	John Capel	20.31	
2007 Osaka	400 m	United States (USA)	Jeremy Wariner	43.45	LaShawn Merritt	43.96	Angelo Taylor	44.32	
2007 Osaka	3000 m st.	Kenya (KEN)	Brimin Kipruto	8:13.82	Ezekiel Kemboi	8:16.94	Richard Mateelong	8:17.59	
2015 Beijing	3000 m st.	Kenya (KEN)	Ezekiel Kemboi	8:11.28	Conseslus Kipruto	8:12.38	Brimin Kipruto	8:12.54	
2022 Eugene	100 m	United States (USA)	Fred Kerley	9.86	Marvin Bracy	9.88	Trayvon Bromell	9.88	
2022 Eugene	200 m	United States (USA)	Noah Lyles	19.31	Kenny Bednarek	19.77	Erriyon Knighton	19.80	
2022 Eugene	Shot put	United States (USA)	Ryan Crouser	22.94 m CR	Joe Kovacs	22.89 m	Josh Awotunde	22.29 m	

== Women ==
Sweeps have only occurred eleven times in women's events. The 10,000 metres is the only event to have had three occurrences, in 2001, 2005 and 2011. Ethiopia had most sweeps, at four. Tirunesh Dibaba and her sister Ejegayehu Dibaba were both a part of two of those sweeps, another sister Genzebe Dibaba and cousin Derartu Tulu gave the family participation in all four Ethiopian sweeps. Tirunesh's husband, Sileshi Sihine, was a part of Ethiopia's men's sweep.

Championships	Event	Country	Gold		Silver		Bronze		Ref
Championships	Event	Country	Athlete	Result	Athlete	Result	Athlete	Result	Ref
1983 Helsinki	Heptathlon	East Germany (GDR)	Ramona Neubert	6714	Sabine Paetz	6662	Anke Vater	6532	
1993 Stuttgart	3000 m	China (CHN)	Qu Yunxia	8:28.71	Zhang Linli	8:29.25	Zhang Lirong	8:31.95	
2001 Edmonton	10,000 m	Ethiopia (ETH)	Derartu Tulu	31:48.81	Berhane Adere	31:48.85	Gete Wami	31:49.98	
2005 Helsinki	5000 m	Ethiopia (ETH)	Tirunesh Dibaba	14:38.59	Meseret Defar	14:39.54	Ejegayehu Dibaba	14:42.47	
2005 Helsinki	10,000 m	Ethiopia (ETH)	Tirunesh Dibaba	30:24.02	Berhane Adere	30:25.41	Ejegayehu Dibaba	30:26.00	
2007 Osaka	Long jump	Russia (RUS)	Tatyana Lebedeva	7.03	Lyudmila Kolchanova	6.92	Tatyana Kotova	6.90	
2011 Daegu	10,000 m	Kenya (KEN)	Vivian Cheruiyot	30:48.98	Sally Kipyego	30:50.04	Linet Masai	30:53.59	
2011 Daegu	Marathon	Kenya (KEN)	Edna Kiplagat	2:28:43	Priscah Jeptoo	2:29:00	Sharon Cherop	2:29:14	
2015 Beijing	5000 m	Ethiopia (ETH)	Almaz Ayana	14:26.83 CR	Senbere Teferi	14:44.07	Genzebe Dibaba	14:44.14	
2019 Doha	20km walk	China (CHN)	Liu Hong	1:32.53	Qieyang Shenjie	1:33.10	Yang Liujing	1:33.17	
2022 Eugene	100 m	Jamaica (JAM)	Shelly-Ann Fraser-Pryce	10.67 CR	Shericka Jackson	10.73	Elaine Thompson-Herah	10.81	
2023 Budapest	10000 m	Ethiopia (ETH)	Gudaf Tsegay	31:27.18	Letesenbet Gidey	31:28.16	Ejgayehu Taye	31:28.31	

== See also ==
- List of medal sweeps in Olympic athletics
