= Dieudonné Disi =

Rwandan runner

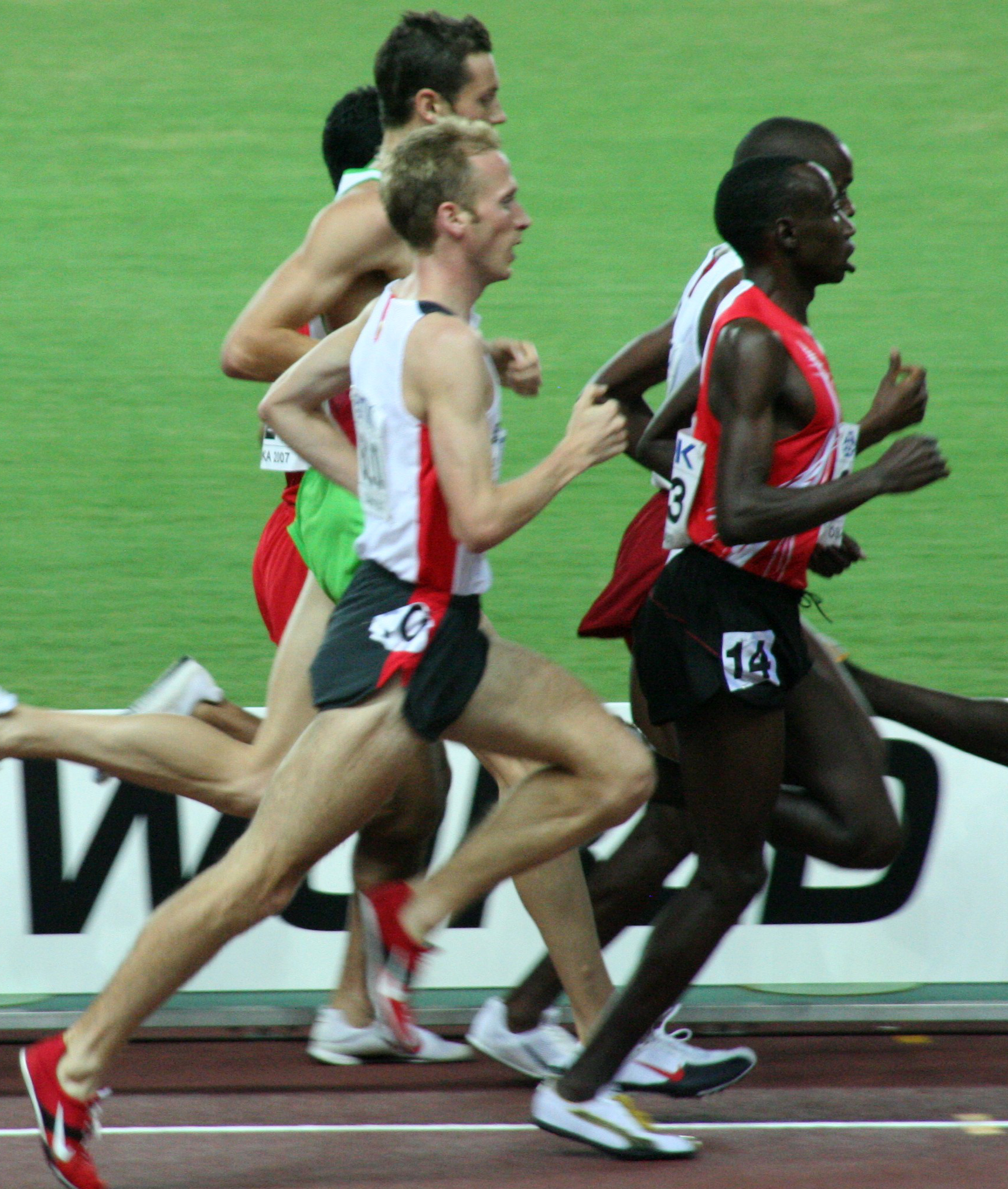
Dieudonné Disi (right) in 2007

Dieudonné Disi (born 24 November 1980 in Ntyazo, Butare) is a Rwandan long-distance and cross country runner.

In 2009 he competed in the marathon at the 2009 World Championships in Athletics, but pulled out at the 28 km mark due to an injury. He rebounded after this with a series of victories in October, winning the 10,000 metres race at the Jeux de la Francophonie, the 20 Kilometres de Paris two weeks later, then equalling the course record at the Reims Half Marathon.

== Competition record ==
Year	Competition	Venue	Position	Event	Notes		
Representing Rwanda
1999	All-Africa Games	Johannesburg, South Africa	19th	5000 m	14:45.16		
2002	African Championships	Radès, Tunisia	13th	5000 m	14:05.58		
2003	All-Africa Games	Abuja, Nigeria	8th	10,000 m	28:37.69		
2004	World Cross Country Championships	Brussels, Belgium	18th	Long race			
2004	African Championships	Brazzaville, Congo	4th	10,000 m	28:39.26		
2004	Olympic Games	Athens, Greece	17th	10,000 m	28:43.19		
2005	World Championships	Helsinki, Finland	17th	10,000 m	27:53.51		
2005	Jeux de la Francophonie	Niamey, Niger	3rd	5000 m	14:16.41		
2005	Jeux de la Francophonie	Niamey, Niger	1st	10,000 m	29:17.11		
2006	World Indoor Championships	Moscow, Russia	17th (h)	3000 m	8:01.73		
2006	World Road Running Championships	Debrecen, Hungary	9th	20 km			
2007	World Championships	Osaka, Japan	16th (h)	5000 m	13:47.30		
2007	World Road Running Championships	Udine, Italy	6th	20 km	59:32 (NR)		
2008	World Half Marathon Championships	Rio de Janeiro, Brazil	6th	Half Marathon	1:03:03	Olympic Games	Beijing, China 19th 27:56.74
2009	World Championships	Berlin, Germany	–	Marathon	DNF		
2009	Marseille-Cassis Classique Internationale	Marseille, France	1st	Half Marathon	1:00:21		
2009	Jeux de la Francophonie	Beirut, Lebanon	1st	10,000 m	29:38.68		
2010	Commonwealth Games	Delhi, India	–	Marathon	DNF		
2014	Commonwealth Games	Glasgow, United Kingdom	18th	Marathon	2:19:14		

=== Personal bests ===
- 3000 metres – 7:50.81 min (2008)
- 5000 metres – 13:25.13 min (2008)
- 10,000 metres – 27:22 min (2007)
- Half marathon – 59:32 min (2007)
