= 2007 World Championships in Athletics – Men's 10,000 metres =

The Men's 10,000 metres event at the 2007 World Championships in Athletics took place on 27 August 2007 at the Nagai Stadium in Osaka, Japan.

== Medalists ==
Gold	Silver	Bronze
Kenenisa Bekele; Ethiopia	Sileshi Sihine; Ethiopia	Martin Mathathi; Kenya

== Records ==
Prior to the competition, the following world and championship records were as follows.

World record	Kenenisa Bekele (ETH)	26:17.53	Brussels, Belgium	26 August 2005
Championship record	Kenenisa Bekele (ETH)	26:49.57	Paris, France	24 August 2003
World leading	Sileshi Sihine (ETH)	26:48.73	Hengelo, Netherlands	26 May 2007

== Schedule ==
Date	Time	Round
August 27, 2007	21:40	Final

== Results ==
Rank	Name	Nationality	Time	Notes
1st place, gold medalist(s)	Kenenisa Bekele	Ethiopia	27:05.90	SB
2nd place, silver medalist(s)	Sileshi Sihine	Ethiopia	27:09.03	
3rd place, bronze medalist(s)	Martin Mathathi	Kenya	27:12.17	
4	Zersenay Tadese	Eritrea	27:21.37	
5	Josephat Ndambiri	Kenya	27:31.41	
6	Gebregziabher Gebremariam	Ethiopia	27:44.58	
7	Abdihakem Abdirahman	United States	27:56.62	
8	Josphat Kiprono Menjo	Kenya	28:25.67	
9	Dathan Ritzenhein	United States	28:28.59	SB
10	Boniface Toroitich Kiprop	Uganda	28:30.99	
11	Galen Rupp	United States	28:41.71	
12	Kensuke Takezawa	Japan	28:51.69	
13	Tadese Tola	Ethiopia	28:51.75	
14	Alejandro Suárez	Mexico	28:52.19	
15	Wilson Busienei	Uganda	29:24.72	SB
16	Dickson Marwa	Tanzania	29:25.91	
17	Kazuhiro Maeda	Japan	29:48.17	
18	Michael Aish	New Zealand	30:34.16	
	Khalid El Aamri	Morocco		DNF
	Simon Bairu	Canada		DNF
	Ahmad Hassan Abdullah	Qatar		DNF
	Essa Ismail Rashed	Qatar		DNF
	Hasan Mahboob	Bahrain		DNS
	David Galván	Mexico		DNS
