= Athletics at the 2004 Summer Olympics – Men's 10,000 metres =

Men's 10,000 metres at the Games of the XXVIII Olympiad
- Olympic Athletics
- Venue: Athens Olympic Stadium
- Dates: 20 August
- Competitors: 24 from 14 nations
- Winning time: 27:05.10 OR

Medalists
1st place, gold medalist(s)		Kenenisa Bekele	Ethiopia
2nd place, silver medalist(s)		Sileshi Sihine	Ethiopia
3rd place, bronze medalist(s)		Zersenay Tadese	Eritrea

Official Video Highlights @ 2:03

The men's 10,000 metres at the 2004 Summer Olympics were held as part of the athletics program at the Athens Olympic Stadium on August 20. For the first time since 1968, no preliminary rounds were held at this distance, since the number of competitors allowed a direct final. The winning margin was 4.29 seconds.

The Ethiopians were in control throughout the distance. A leading group of five runners crystallized. As Kenenisa Bekele and Sileshi Sihine turned up the pace with two kilometres left, Zersenay Tadese, Boniface Kiprop Toroitich and reigning Olympic champion Haile Gebrselassie, who was running with a calf injury, were not able to keep up. Bekele, the world record holder, assured his victory with a brilliant Olympic record finish (27:05.10 minutes), completing the final 400 metres in less than 54 seconds.

== Records ==
Prior to the competition, the existing World record, Olympic record, and world leading time were as follows:

World record	Kenenisa Bekele (ETH)	26:20.31	Ostrava, Czech Republic	8 June 2004
Olympic record	Haile Gebrselassie (ETH)	27:07.34	Atlanta, United States	29 July 1996
World Leading	Kenenisa Bekele (ETH)	26:20.31	Ostrava, Czech Republic	8 June 2004

The following record was established during the competition:

Date	Event	Name	Nationality	Result	Record
20 August	Final	Kenenisa Bekele	Ethiopia	27:05.10	OR

== Qualification ==
The qualification period for athletics was 1 January 2003 to 9 August 2004. For the men's 10,000 metres, each National Olympic Committee was permitted to enter up to three athletes that had run the race in 27:49.00 or faster during the qualification period. If an NOC had no athletes that qualified under that standard, one athlete that had run the race in 28:06.00 or faster could be entered.

== Schedule ==
All times are Greece Standard Time (UTC+2)

Date	Time	Round
Friday, 20 August 2004	22:35	Final

== Results ==
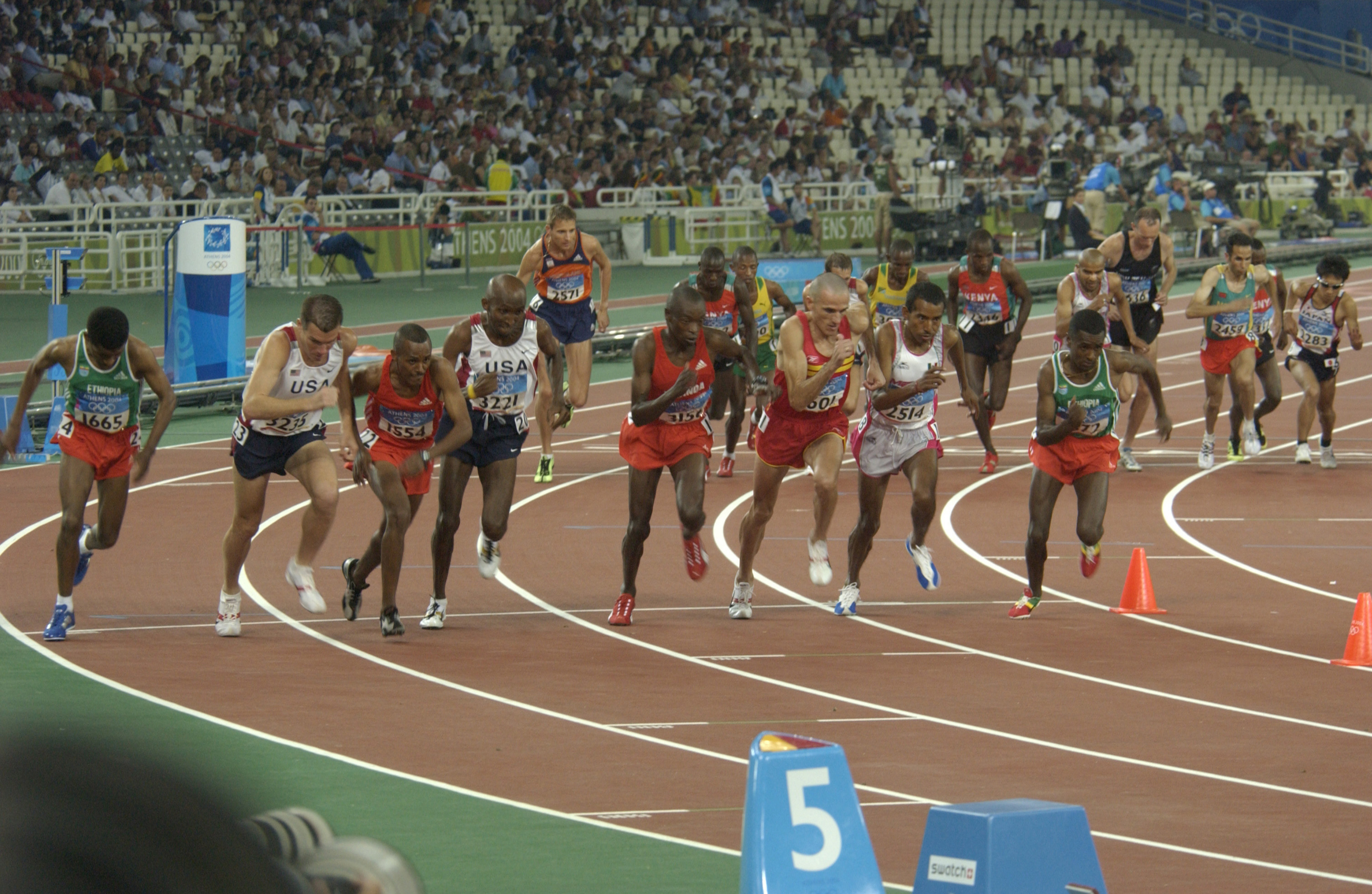
Athletes take off at the start of the men's 10,000 metres final.

Rank	Name	Nationality	Result	Notes
1st place, gold medalist(s)	Kenenisa Bekele	Ethiopia	27:05.10	OR
2nd place, silver medalist(s)	Sileshi Sihine	Ethiopia	27:09.39	
3rd place, bronze medalist(s)	Zersenay Tadese	Eritrea	27:22.57	NR
4	Boniface Kiprop Toroitich	Uganda	27:25.48	SB
5	Haile Gebrselassie	Ethiopia	27:27.70	
6	John Cheruiyot Korir	Kenya	27:41.91	SB
7	Moses Mosop	Kenya	27:46.61	
8	Ismaïl Sghyr	France	27:57.09	
9	José Manuel Martínez	Spain	27:57.61	
10	Fabiano Joseph Naasi	Tanzania	28:01.94	SB
11	Wilson Busienei	Uganda	28:10.75	
12	Dan Browne	United States	28:14.53	
13	Charles Kamathi	Kenya	28:17.08	
14	Kamiel Maase	Netherlands	28:23.39	
15	Abdi Abdirahman	United States	28:26.26	
16	Yonas Kifle	Eritrea	28:29.87	
17	Dieudonne Disi	Rwanda	28:43.19	
18	Mohammed Amyne	Morocco	28:55.96	
19	Ryuji Ono	Japan	29:06.50	
20	Teodoro Vega	Mexico	29:06.55	
21	David Galván	Mexico	29:38.05	
	John Henwood	New Zealand	DNF	
	John Yuda Msuri	Tanzania	DNF	
	Dathan Ritzenhein	United States	DNF	
