= 2006 IAAF World Indoor Championships – Men's 3000 metres =

The Men's 3000 metres event at the 2006 IAAF World Indoor Championships was held on March 10–12.

== Medalists ==
Gold	Silver	Bronze
Kenenisa Bekele; Ethiopia	Saif Saaeed Shaheen; Qatar	Eliud Kipchoge; Kenya

== Results ==
=== Heats ===
First 4 of each heat (Q) and the next 4 fastest (q) qualified for the final.

Rank	Heat	Name	Nationality	Time	Notes
1	1	Eliud Kipchoge	Kenya	7:52.57	Q
2	1	Tariku Bekele	Ethiopia	7:52.58	Q
3	1	Saif Saaeed Shaheen	Qatar	7:52.85	Q
4	1	Alistair Cragg	Ireland	7:53.74	Q, SB
5	1	Günther Weidlinger	Austria	7:53.83	q
6	1	Halil Akkas	Turkey	7:54.60	q
7	2	Kenenisa Bekele	Ethiopia	7:54.85	Q
8	1	Tareq Mubarak Taher	Bahrain	7:55.10	q
9	2	Shedrack Kibet Korir	Kenya	7:55.14	Q
10	2	Moukheld Al-Outaibi	Saudi Arabia	7:55.14	Q
11	2	Adil Kaouch	Morocco	7:55.18	Q
12	1	Pavel Naumov	Russia	7:55.28	q
13	2	Sergey Ivanov	Russia	7:56.44	
14	2	César Pérez	Spain	7:58.06	
15	2	Vincent Le Dauphin	France	7:58.60	
16	1	Jonathon Riley	United States	7:59.30	
17	2	Dieudonné Disi	Rwanda	8:01.73	PB
18	2	Aadam Ismaeel Khamis	Bahrain	8:02.16	
19	1	Isaac Kiprop	Uganda	8:05.00	NR
20	2	Iaroslav Muşinschi	Moldova	8:08.35	SB
21	1	Francisco Javier Alves	Spain	8:11.85	
22	2	Steve Slattery	United States	8:17.15	
23	1	Bjørnar Ustad Kristensen	Norway	8:21.90	PB
24	2	Jorge Cabrera	Paraguay	8:33.95	NR

=== Final ===
Rank	Name	Nationality	Time	Notes
1st place, gold medalist(s)	Kenenisa Bekele	Ethiopia	7:39.32	
2nd place, silver medalist(s)	Saif Saaeed Shaheen	Qatar	7:41.28	
3rd place, bronze medalist(s)	Eliud Kipchoge	Kenya	7:42.58	
4	Alistair Cragg	Ireland	7:46.43	SB
5	Shedrack Kibet Korir	Kenya	7:47.11	
6	Tariku Bekele	Ethiopia	7:47.67	
7	Adil Kaouch	Morocco	7:48.01	
8	Moukheld Al-Outaibi	Saudi Arabia	7:52.91	
9	Pavel Naumov	Russia	7:56.24	
10	Günther Weidlinger	Austria	7:57.32	
11	Tareq Mubarak Taher	Bahrain	8:04.99	
12	Halil Akkas	Turkey	8:10.37	
