= Ethiopian Athletics Federation =

National governing body of athletics in Ethiopia

- Sport: Athletics
- Abbreviation: EAF
- Founded: 4 June 1961
- Affiliation: World Athletics
- Location: Addis Ababa, Ethiopia
- President: Sileshi Sihine
- Vice president: Gezahegne Abera
- Secretary: Bililign Mekoya Workneh

Official website
- eaf.org.et
- (Ethiopia)

Ethiopian Athletic Federation (EAF) is an WA recognized member officially representing Ethiopia as the national governing body for the sport of Athletics.

== History ==
The history of the sport may be traced back to military and school organizations in 1897. The organization was formed on 4 June 1961. The ability of East African athletes was announced to the world in the 1960 Olympics as barefooted Abebe Bikila took the gold medal in the Marathon. Bikila repeated in 1964 and the floodgates were opened. Ethiopia has captured 45 Olympic medals, all of them in long distance running through 2012, despite participating in three Olympic boycotts. The organization is also responsible for selecting representatives to other world championship events.

In November 2016, former Olympic gold medalist and Ethiopian long distance running great Haile Gebrselassie was elected president of the Ethiopian Athletics Federation. On 14 November 2018, double Olympic champion Derartu Tulu succeeded Haile Gebrselassie as president of EAF. On 22 December 2024, following an abysmal performance at the 2024 Paris Olympics under Derartu Tulu's leadership, two-time Olympic silver medalist Sileshi Sihine was elected president of the Ethiopian Athletics Federation, replacing Tulu.

== Kit suppliers ==
Ethiopia's kits are currently supplied by Adidas.
