= 2005 World Championships in Athletics – Men's 10,000 metres =

The Men's 10,000 metres event featured at the 2005 World Championships in Athletics in the Helsinki Olympic Stadium. The final was held on 8 August 2005.

== Medalists ==
Gold	Kenenisa Bekele; Ethiopia (ETH)
Silver	Sileshi Sihine; Ethiopia (ETH)
Bronze	Moses Mosop; Kenya (KEN)

== Finishing times ==
Rank	Name	Result
Gold medal	Kenenisa Bekele (ETH)	27:08.33
Silver medal	Sileshi Sihine (ETH)	27:08.87
Bronze medal	Moses Mosop (KEN)	27:08.96 (PB)
4.	Boniface Kiprop Toroitich (UGA)	27:10.98 (SB)
5.	Martin Mathathi (KEN)	27:12.51
6.	Zersenay Tadese (ERI)	27:12.82 (NR)
7.	Abebe Dinkesa (ETH)	27:13.09
8.	Abderrahim Goumri (MAR)	27:14.64
9.	Nicholas Kemboi (QAT)	27:16.22 (SB)
10.	Juan Carlos de la Ossa (ESP)	27:33.42
11.	Yonas Kifle (ERI)	27:35.72
12.	Charles Kamathi (KEN)	27:37.82
13.	Abdihakem Abdirahman (USA)	27:52.01
14.	Christian Belz (SWI)	27:53.16 (NR)
15.	Gebregziabher Gebremariam (ETH)	27:53.19
16.	Sultan Khamis Zaman (QAT)	27:53.33
17.	Dieudonné Disi (RWA)	27:53.51 (PB)
18.	John Yuda Msuri (TAN)	27:57.31
19.	Yu Mitsuya (JPN)	27:57.67
20.	Mohammed Amyn (MAR)	28:12.59
21.	Khalid El Aamri (MAR)	28:37.72
22.	Terukazu Omori (JPN)	28:59.46
—	Mebrahtom Keflezighi (USA)	DNF
