= John Henwood =

New Zealand long-distance runner

Personal information
- Full name: John Bray Henwood
- Nationality: New Zealand
- Born: 30 August 1972 (age 53)

Sport
- Sport: Long-distance running
- Event: 10,000 metres

John Bray Henwood (born 30 August 1972) is a retired New Zealand long-distance runner. He competed in the men's 10,000 metres at the 2004 Summer Olympics.

Following his career, Henwood became a coach for long distance runners such as Jane Vongvorachoti.
