= Kenenisa Bekele =

Ethiopian long-distance runner (born 1982)

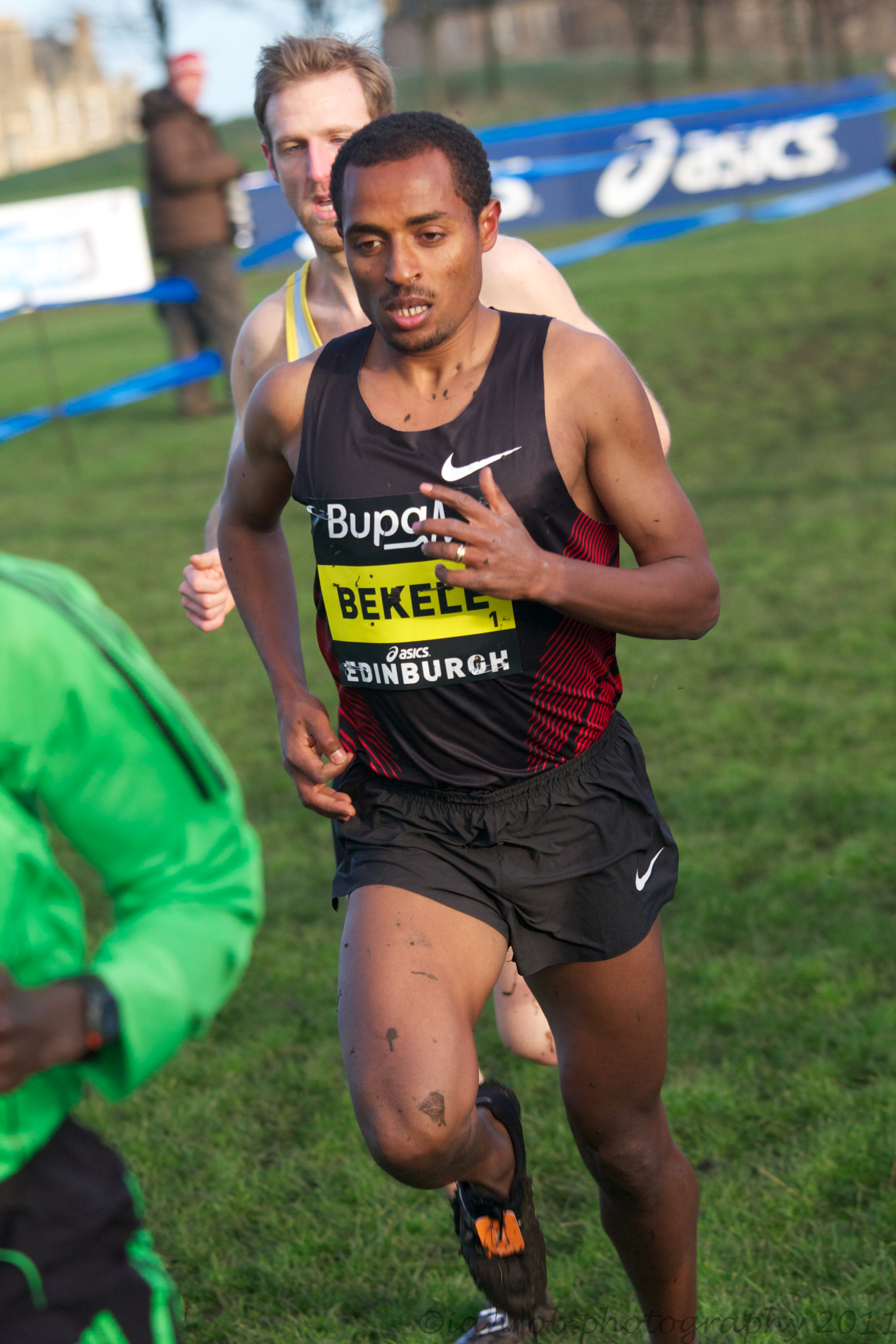
- Kenenisa in 2012

Personal information
- Full name: Kenenisa Bekele Beyecha
- Nationality: Ethiopian
- Born: 13 June 1982 (age 44) near Bekoji, Arsi Province, Socialist Ethiopia
- Height: 165 cm (5 ft 5 in)
- Weight: 56 kg (123 lb)

Sport
- Country: Ethiopia
- Sport: Track, Long-distance running
- Events: 5000 metres, 10,000 metres, Marathon
- Team: Anta Sports; NN Running Team (past)

Achievements and titles
- Personal bests: 5000 m: 12:37.35 (Hengelo 2004); 10,000 m: 26:17.53 NR (Brussels 2005); Marathon: 2:01:41 (Berlin 2019); Marathon: 2:04:15 MWR (London 2024); Indoors; 2000 m: 4:49.99i AB (Birmingham 2007); 2 Miles: 8:04.35i AB (Birmingham 2008); 5000 m: 12:49.60i AR (Birmingham 2004)
Medal record
Men's athletics
Representing Ethiopia
Event	1st	2nd	3rd
Olympic Games	3	1	0
World Championships	5	0	1
World Indoor Championships	1	0	0
African Championships	2	0	0
All-African Games	2	0	0
World Cross Country Championships	11	1	0
World Marathon Majors	2	2	2
Total	26	4	2
Olympic Games
Gold medal – first place	2004 Athens	10,000 m
Gold medal – first place	2008 Beijing	5000 m
Gold medal – first place	2008 Beijing	10,000 m
Silver medal – second place	2004 Athens	5000 m
World Championships
Gold medal – first place	2003 Paris	10,000 m
Gold medal – first place	2005 Helsinki	10,000 m
Gold medal – first place	2007 Osaka	10,000 m
Gold medal – first place	2009 Berlin	5000 m
Gold medal – first place	2009 Berlin	10,000 m
Bronze medal – third place	2003 Paris	5000 m
World Indoor Championships
Gold medal – first place	2006 Moscow	3000 m
African Championships
Gold medal – first place	2006 Bambous	5000 m
Gold medal – first place	2008 Addis Ababa	5000 m
All-Africa Games
Gold medal – first place	2003 Abuja	5000 m
World Cross Country Championships
Gold medal – first place	2002 Dublin	Long race
Gold medal – first place	2002 Dublin	Short race
Gold medal – first place	2003 Lausanne	Long race
Gold medal – first place	2003 Lausanne	Short race
Gold medal – first place	2004 Brussels	Long race
Gold medal – first place	2004 Brussels	Short race
Gold medal – first place	2005 Saint-Galmier	Long race
Gold medal – first place	2005 Saint-Galmier	Short race
Gold medal – first place	2006 Fukuoka	Long race
Gold medal – first place	2006 Fukuoka	Short race
Gold medal – first place	2008 Edinburgh	Long race
Silver medal – second place	2001 Ostend	Short race
World Marathon Majors
Gold medal – first place	2016 Berlin	Marathon
Gold medal – first place	2019 Berlin	Marathon
Silver medal – second place	2017 London	Marathon
Silver medal – second place	2024 London	Marathon
Bronze medal – third place	2016 London	Marathon
Bronze medal – third place	2021 Berlin	Marathon

Kenenisa Bekele Beyecha (Oromo: Qananiisaa baqqalaa; Amharic: ቀነኒሳ በቀለ; born 13 June 1982) is an Ethiopian long-distance runner. He was the world record holder in both the 5,000-metre and 10,000-metre from 2004 until 2020. He won the gold medal in both the 5,000 m and 10,000 m events at the 2008 Beijing Olympics. At the 2004 Olympics, he won the gold medal in the 10,000 m and the silver medal in the 5,000 m.

He is the most successful runner in the history of the IAAF World Cross Country Championships, with six long (12 km) course and five short (4 km) course titles. He won the 10,000 m title at the World Championships in Athletics in 2003, 2005, 2007 and 2009 (matching Haile Gebrselassie's four in a row win streak). Kenenisa was unbeaten over 10,000 m from his debut in 2003 until 2011, when he failed to finish at the World Championships final.

At the 2009 World Championships in Athletics he became the first man to win both 5000 m and 10,000 m title at the same championships. Over 5000 m he has also won an Olympic silver (2004), World Championship bronze (2003), two African Championship titles and one All-Africa Games gold medal. He also won the 3000 metres title at the 2006 World Indoor Championships.

On 6 April 2014, he produced the sixth fastest marathon debut ever on a record-eligible course with his victory at the Paris Marathon, in a course record time of 2:05:04. On 25 September 2016, Kenenisa won the Berlin Marathon in a time of 2:03:03, a new personal best, then the third-fastest marathon of all time. On 29 September 2019, he again won the Berlin Marathon in a time of 2:01:41, two seconds slower than the then world record of 2:01:39 set by Eliud Kipchoge in the 2018 Berlin Marathon. Considering his accomplishments in cross country, track, and road racing, many consider him to be the greatest distance runner of all time.

== Early life ==
Kenenisa Bekele was born in 1982 in Bekoji in the Arsi Zone of Oromia Region, the same town as several other prominent long-distance runners, including the Dibaba's Daughters (Ejegayehu, Tirunesh and Genzebe) and their cousin Derartu Tulu. Kenenisa was born the second child to parents who made a living as barley farmers, along with three brothers and two sisters. The family practiced Ethiopian Orthodox Christianity.

Kenenisa initially aspired to a career in medicine, education, or the civil service. He began to train seriously in running with the encouragement of a physical education teacher, while drawing inspiration from the success of Derartu Tulu and Haile Gebrselassie. Kenenisa achieved his first medals at an international competition with second-place finishes in both the 3000 metres of the 1999 World Youth Championships and the 5000 metres of the 2000 World Junior Championships. He won his first gold medal in the junior race of the 2001 World Cross Country Championships. His success in running enabled him to purchase a house and to help fund his siblings' educations.

== Running career ==
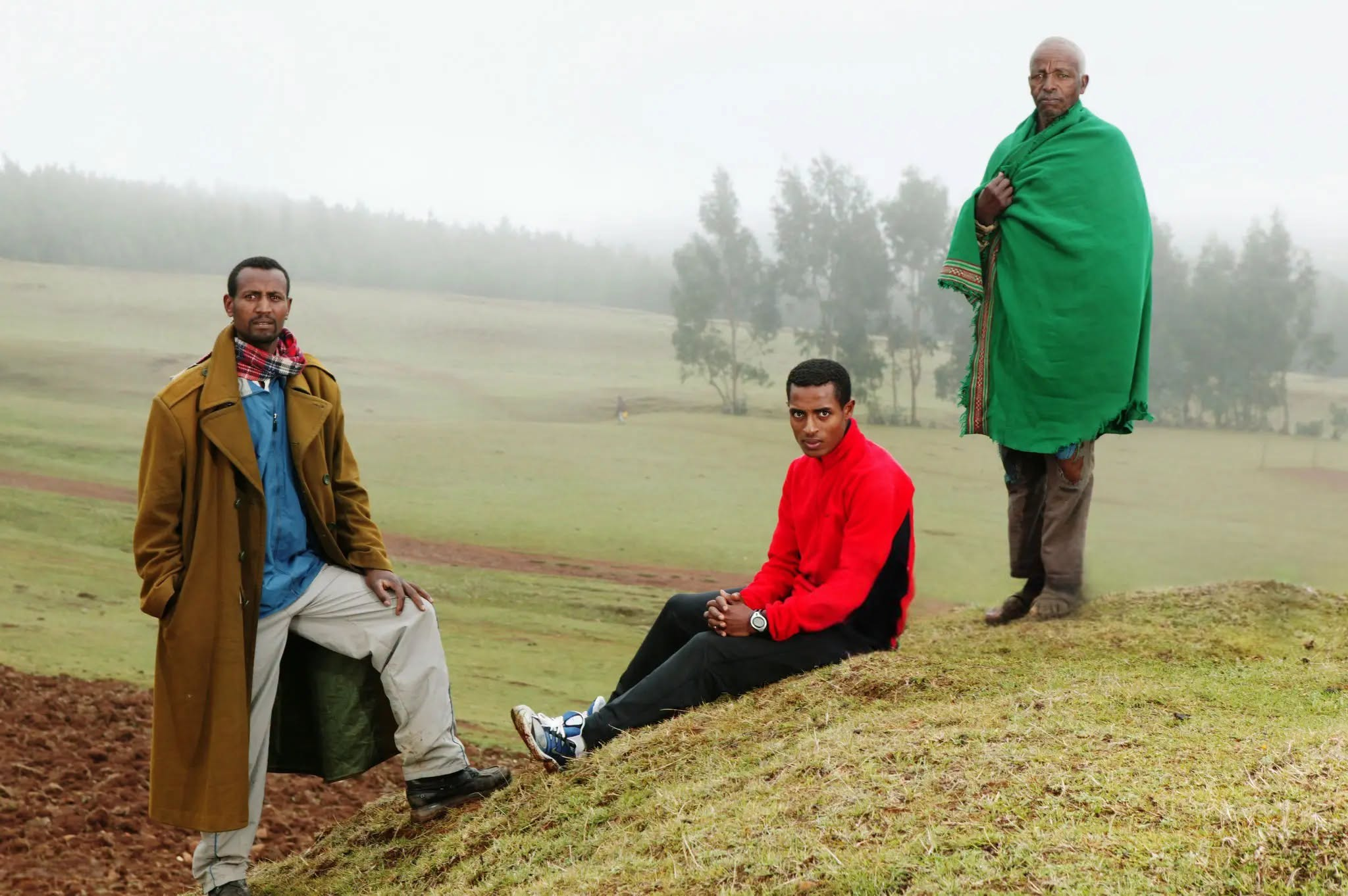
Kenenisa Bekele, 5000m and 10000m runner of Ethiopia and Olympic contender for Athens on April 6, 2004

=== 2001 – 2003: Early career ===
In August 2001, Kenenisa set a 3000 metres world junior record by running 7:30.67 minutes in Brussels. The record lasted for three and a half years, being broken by Augustine Choge with a run of 7:28.78 minutes. In December 2000 and 2001 Kenenisa won the 15k roadrace Montferland Run in the Netherlands. For five years in a row, from 2002 (at the age of 19) through 2006, he took both short (4 km) and long (12 km) races at the IAAF World Cross Country Championships, a feat no other runner has accomplished even once. After the IAAF eliminated the short course race in 2007, Kenenisa won a final long course race in 2008, bringing his World Cross Country medal totals to 11 senior individual gold medals (6 long course, 5 short course), 1 senior silver medal (2001), 1 junior gold medal (2001), 2 team gold medals (2004, 2005), 3 team silver medals (2002, 2003, & 2008), and 1 team bronze medal (2006) for a grand total of 19 medals.

Kenenisa became known for his ability to accelerate very quickly at the end of a long-distance race; in Oslo in June 2003, he chased after Kenyan Abraham Chebii and won the race in 12:52.26. He has faced fellow Ethiopian, Haile Gebrselassie, twice in road competition, once in cross country, and six times on the track. Haile defeated Kenenisa on the track in the 2000 Nurnberg 5000 metres, the 2001 Great Ethiopian Run 10 km, and the Cross de l'Acier in December 2001, but lost to Kenenisa in Hengelo 2003 over 10,000 m (26:53 to 26:54), Rome 2003 over 5000 m (12:57 to 13:00), Paris 2003 World Championships over 10,000 m (26:49 to 26:50), Athens 2004 Olympic Games (27:05 to 27:27), in the 10,000 m in the Beijing 2008 Olympic Games (27:01 to 27:06), and in the Great North Run half marathon in September 2013 (60:09 to 60:41).

=== 2004 season ===
In 2004, Kenenisa broke the world records for the indoor 5000 m, outdoor 5000 m and outdoor 10,000 m (both in a timeframe of 9 days). He won the short and long course world cross country titles, leading Ethiopia to the senior men's team title. He also won a gold medal in the men's 10,000 metres and a silver medal in the men's 5000 metres in the 2004 Olympic Games in Athens.

=== 2005 season ===
On 4 January 2005, Kenenisa's fiancée, 18-year-old Alem Techale, died of an apparent heart attack while on a training run with him. Although it was initially stated that no autopsy was performed, Alem's and Kenenisa's manager Jos Hermens later said that an autopsy had revealed nothing conclusive about Techale's death. She was the 2003 World Youth Champion in the 1500 metres and in excellent physical condition.

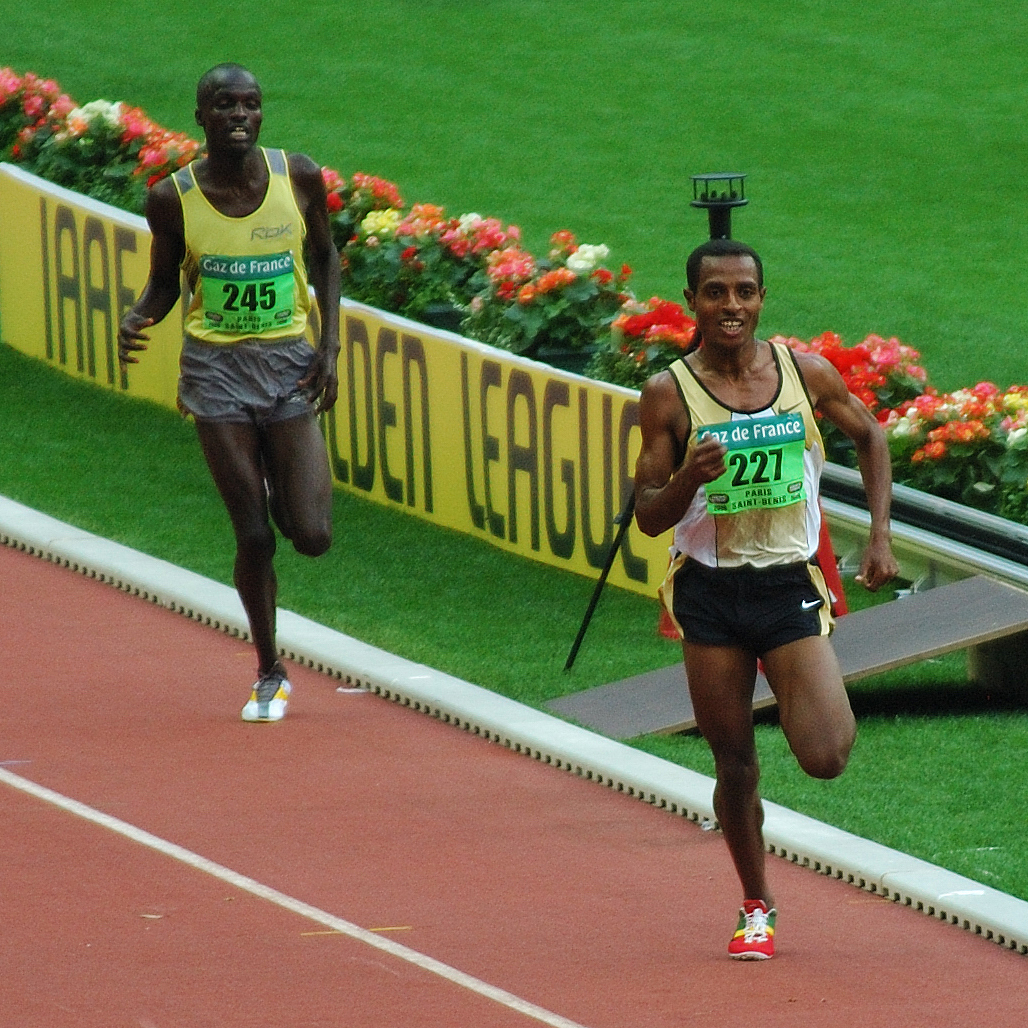
Kenenisa competing in the 2006 Golden League.

He resumed racing on 29 January, and lost indoors over 3000 m to Ireland's Alistair Cragg after sprinting towards the line with one and a half laps to go, while thinking that there was only half a lap left. A few weeks later he lost to fellow Ethiopian Markos Geneti over two miles.

In March, Kenenisa lined up to defend his long and short course titles at the 2005 IAAF World Cross Country Championships. He won on the short course despite a fast pace set by Qatari Saif Saaeed Shaheen, and followed that win with a long course victory the next day over Eritrean Zersenay Tadese and Kenyan rival Eliud Kipchoge.

On 8 August 2005, Kenenisa Bekele won the gold medal in the 10,000 m at the 2005 World Championships in Helsinki with a last 200 m spurt. On 26 August 2005, Kenenisa set the 10,000 m world record 26:17.53 at the 29th Memorial Van Damme meeting in Brussels, slicing nearly three seconds off his previous world record 26:20.31, and running with 5000 m splits of 13:09 and 13:08 minutes. The race saw 6 runners finishing in less than 27 minutes, with Sammy Wanjiru dipping in 26:41.75, a new world junior record. At the end of 2005 Kenenisa was voted the Track & Field News magazine athlete of the year for the second year in a row.

=== 2006–2007 ===
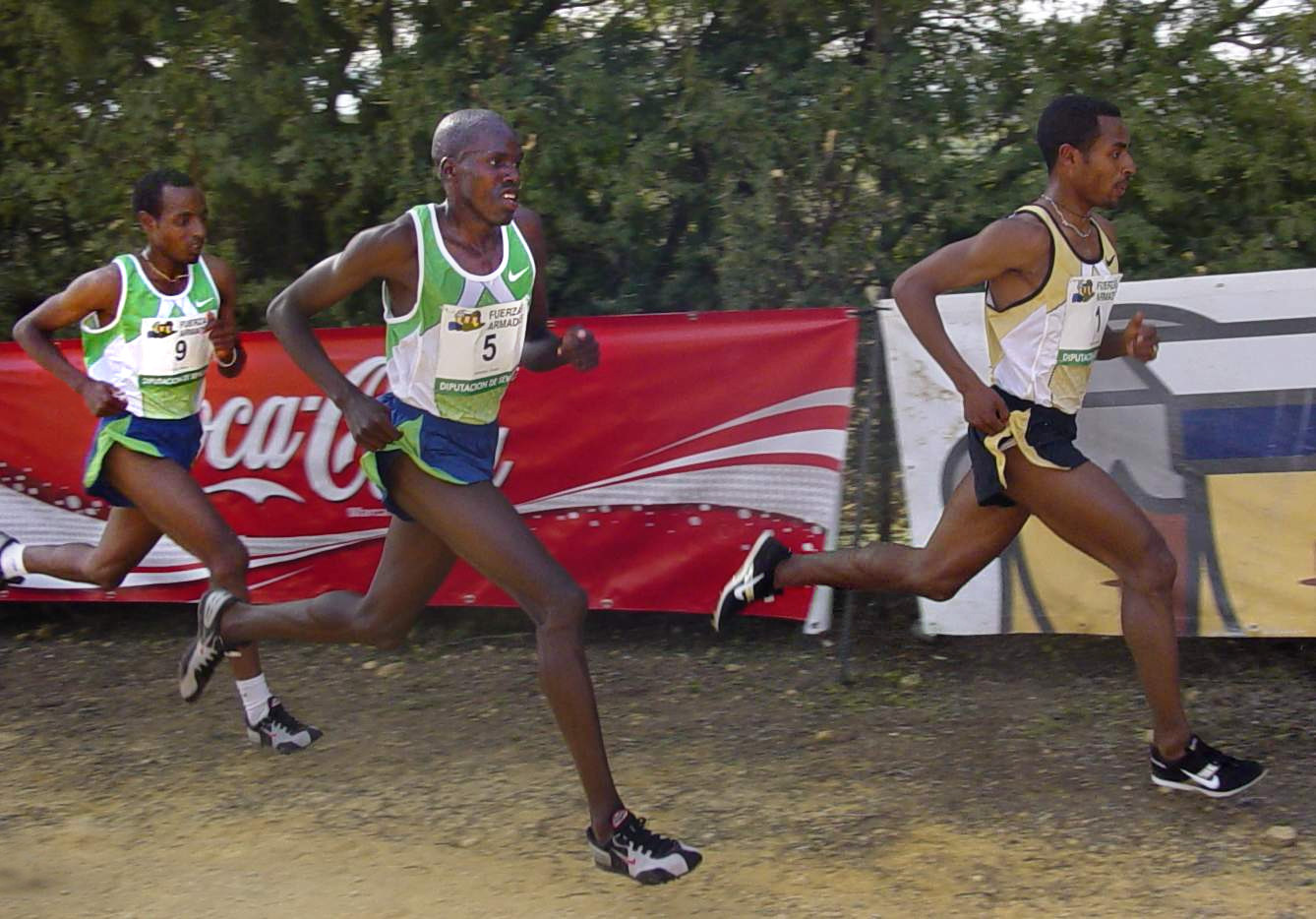
Kenenisa leading the way at the 2007 Cross de Itálica.

When Kenenisa won the 3000 m at the 2006 IAAF World Indoor Championships in Moscow, he became the first athlete in history to be Olympic champion, world outdoor track champion, world indoor track champion, and world cross country champion. In 2006 he won five out of six IAAF Golden League events (5000 m) in the same season, which earned him a total of US$83,333.

On 17 February 2007, he broke the indoor world record over 2000 m in Birmingham, with a time of 4:49.99. His spectacular final 300 m aided this time which would be considered excellent even outdoors. On 24 March 2007, however, his streak of 27 consecutive victories in cross country races (dating back to his last previous loss in December 2001) came to an end when after leading the race in the penultimate lap of the 2007 IAAF World Cross Country Championships in Mombasa he succumbed to the very hot, humid conditions (which caused more than 1/6 of all competitors to drop out) and was passed by eventual winner Zersenay Tadese on the last lap before Kenenisa dropped out. This was greeted with cheers by the Kenyan crowds, an occurrence which has been frowned upon by the wider athletics community.

He recovered from that rare failure to take the 10,000-metre title at the 2007 IAAF World Championships in Osaka, once again besting his compatriot Sileshi Sihine. During that race, he looked like he was going to be dropped several times over the last 800 metres, but recovered to overtake Sileshi with 150 metres to go and take his third straight world title.

=== 2008: Beijing Olympics ===
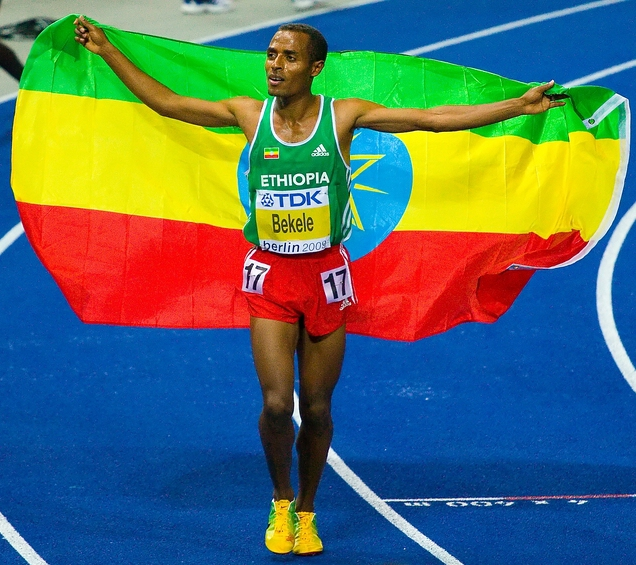
Celebrating his gold medal victory at the 2009 World Championships.

In Edinburgh on 30 March 2008, he won his sixth World Cross Country title (long course – 12k), breaking the three-way tie of 5 wins he had previously shared with Paul Tergat and John Ngugi. With this win, Kenenisa laid sole claim to most decorated athlete in IAAF World Cross Country Championships history. He has won 6 long course (12k) individual gold medals, 5 short course (4k) gold medals, 1 junior championship (8k), and 4 team gold medals for a sum total of 16 gold medals. His overall medal count (both individual and team results) stands at 27 medals: 16 gold, 9 silver and 2 bronze.

On 17 August 2008 Kenenisa won gold in the 10,000m finals with a time of 27:01.17, setting a new Olympic Record in the process. In a race in which 20 men broke the 28-minute barrier and four finished under his 2004 Olympic record of 27:05.10, he needed his renowned finishing kick to pull out the victory, running a 53.42-second final 400 metres (similar to the 53.02-second final 400-metre sprint he used to win the gold medal in Athens in 2004 over the same distance).

On 23 August 2008 Kenenisa bested his competitors and won the 5000-metre finals, shattering Saïd Aouita's Olympic Record by almost eight seconds with a time of 12:57.82. The race was remarkable for his manner of doing most of the pacing himself before accelerating to a scintillating finish: his last 3000 metres only took 7:35.53, his final 2000 metres 4:56.97, last 1600 metres 3:57.01 (=3:58.4 final mile) and his final lap a punishing 53.87 seconds. By winning the 10,000/5000m double in the Beijing Olympics, Kenenisa joined another elite group of athletes: Hannes Kolehmainen (1912), Emil Zátopek (1952), Vladimir Kuts (1956), Lasse Virén (twice, in 1972 and 1976) and Miruts Yifter (1980).

=== 2009: Berlin World Championships ===
Kenenisa Bekele won two gold medals at the 2009 World Championships in Athletics, held in Berlin. His double victories in 5000m (13:17.09) and 10,000m (26:46.31 – a World Championships Record) were unprecedented and by doing this became the first man to take both the long-distance track gold medals at the same World Championships. His talent combination of endurance and speed has made it nearly impossible to defeat Kenenisa when he is at full strength. During the 10,000m race in which he was running behind Eritrea's Zersenay Tadesse, the broadcaster declared "it is over, in fact it was over from the start" as the final lap began and Kenenisa turned an ostensibly close race into a blowout. The IAAF announcer concluded, "this man is probably the greatest distance runner we will ever see."

In spite of his unrivalled success in athletics, Kenenisa did not experience the mainstream appeal that others such as Haile Gebrselassie did. His quiet demeanour and aversion to interviews did not make him a highly marketable athlete in the Western world. Fellow world record holder Usain Bolt stated that Kenenisa Bekele's achievements had not received the recognition that they deserved.

=== 2010: Injuries ===
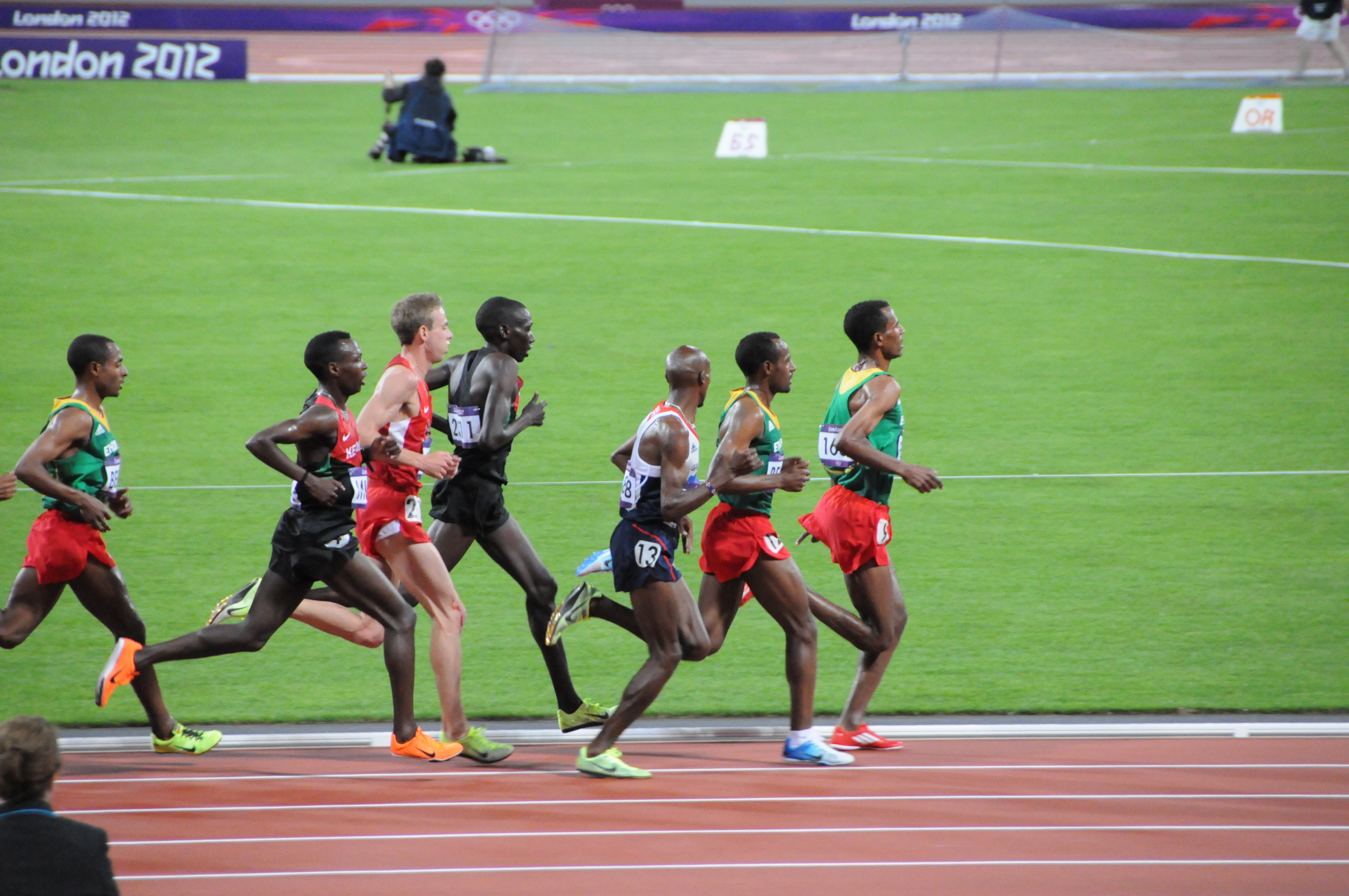
Kenenisa pursuing the lead pack in the Men's 10,000 metres final event at the 2012 Summer Olympics.

Kenenisa made a disappointing start to 2010, finishing fourth in the Edinburgh Cross Country in a race he was favored to win – a trio of Kenyan athletes ran him out of the contest over the final lap. He spent the entirety of the indoor and outdoor seasons out with a ruptured calf muscle.

=== 2011 World Championships and 2012 Olympics ===
Kenenisa Bekele finally returned to training after a knee injury in March 2011. Having not raced on the track since 2009, Kenenisa returned for the World Championships. He dropped out of the 10,000m with 10 laps remaining. Kenenisa decided not to run the 5000 m and returned to the Diamond League at the Ivo Van Damme Memorial in Brussels where he set the fastest time in the world for the 10,000 metres in 2011.

Kenenisa's 2012 season did not start well, as he was a lowly eleventh place at the Edinburgh Cross Country. In April, he appeared to have returned to form by winning the Great Ireland Run in a new personal best time for a 10 km road race of 27:49, improving the course record by 46 seconds.

In the 2012 London Olympics 10,000m race he ran within the leading group for the whole race, but could not keep up with the Mo Farah's sprint in the last 150 metres and eventually finished fourth, with a time of 27:32.44, just 1.01 second outside the bronze medalist, his brother Tariku.

In his first race of 2013 he won the Great Ireland Run for a second time. Kenenisa then won the Great North Run half marathon in a time of 60:09, beating Mo Farah by just one second after making a move that Farah couldn't match with just less than 12 miles gone.

=== Marathon career ===
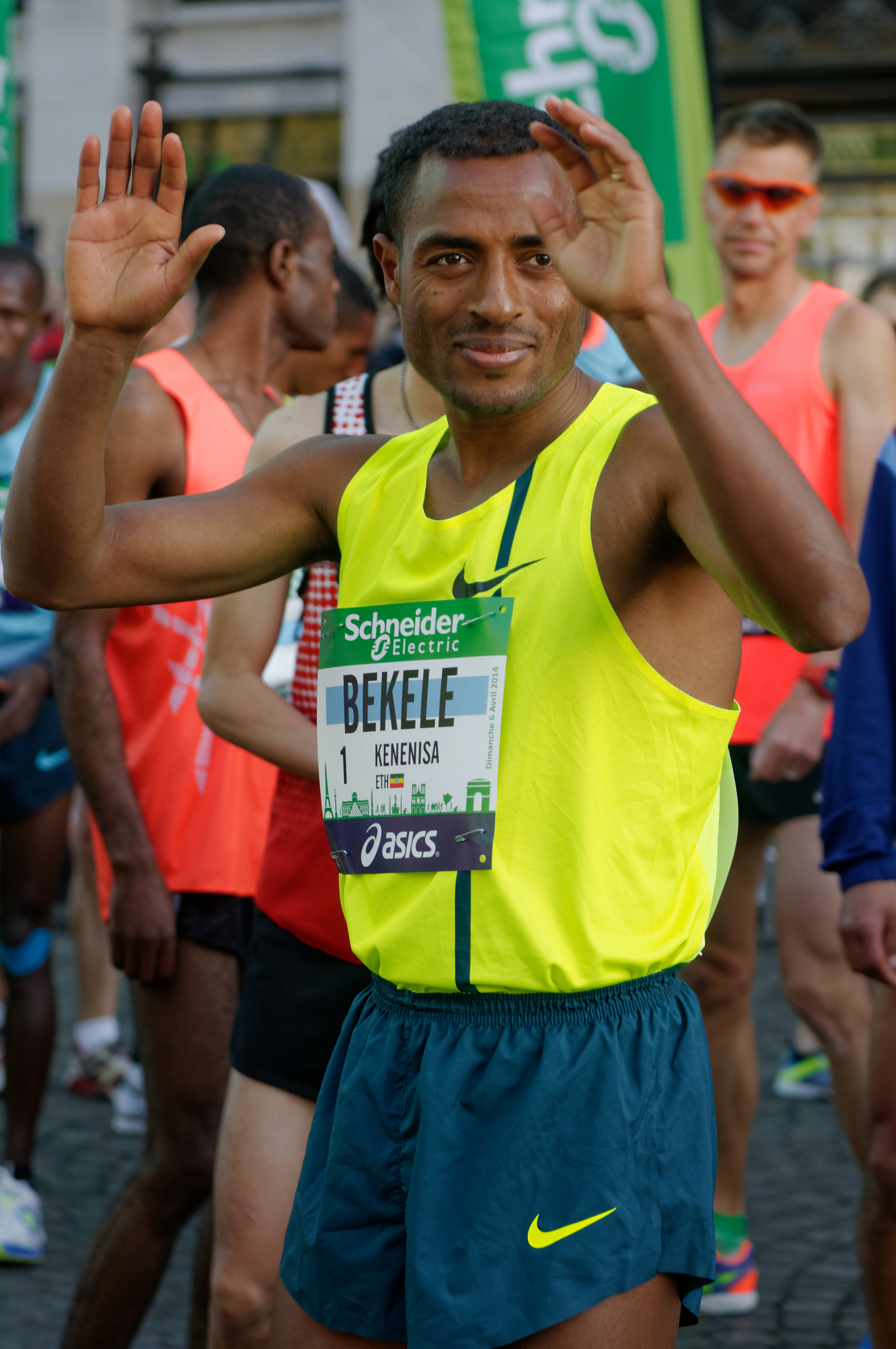
Kenenisa Bekele at the 2014 Paris Marathon

2014 - 2015

Kenenisa Bekele started his marathon career in the 2014 Paris Marathon on 6 April 2014. His marathon debut was very successful as he bettered both the Paris course record and the debut marathon times of past legends Haile Gebrselassie, Paul Tergat and Samuel Wanjiru by running 2:05:04 to win. Kenenisa then went on to compete in the 2014 Chicago Marathon on 12 October 2014. He finished fourth in 2:05:51, 1min 40s behind Kenya's Eliud Kipchoge. On 23 January 2015, Kenenisa took on the Dubai Marathon, where he had to retire from the race after 30 km. He was planned to compete in the 2015 London Marathon but had to withdraw due to a persistent injury to his right Achilles tendon.

Following 11 months of injury, Kenenisa returned to racing at the 2016 London Marathon. Prior to the race he indicated he was only currently at 90% fitness. Kenenisa finished in 3rd place behind winner Eliud Kipchoge and runner-up Stanley Biwott in a time of 2:06:36. This performance was despite the fact he only returned to jogging in early 2016 following injury and had only completed 6 weeks of specific marathon training. He was also hampered in the race by missing his drinks at 5 separate stations, due to them being used by the designated pacemakers.

2016 - 2017

On 24 April, he placed third at the 2016 London Marathon with a time of two hours six minutes and 38 seconds. In September he won the 2016 Berlin Marathon in a time of 2:03:03 which set a new personal best time for him at the Marathon distance and the second fastest marathon of all time. On 19 January 2017, attempting to break the world record, Kenenisa dropped out of the Dubai Marathon after the half way mark due to a fall at the beginning of the race. On 23 April 2017, Kenenisa finished second in the London Marathon, finishing in 2:05:57, 9 seconds behind winner Daniel Wanjiru.

Kenenisa's outstanding track career led to his involvement in a project to break the two-hour barrier for the marathon, though a number of factors undermined this effort.

2018 - 2019

Kenenisa ran the 2018 London Marathon in April and came in sixth place with a time of 2:08:53. He also ran the Amsterdam marathon in October 2018 but dropped out due to injury with about 2 km to go. Kenenisa won the 2019 Berlin Marathon in September in 2:01:41, the second fastest time ever at the time and just two seconds off of the world record set by Eliud Kipchoge on the same course the previous year. After the run he stated that he still believes that he can break the world record.

2020 - 2021

Kenenisa won the London half marathon on 1 March 2020 in 60:22. He improved on the course record set by Mo Farah in 2019 by 1:18. Chris Thompson came in second with 61:07, also within the former course record. Kenenisa returned to the Berlin Marathon in September, where he placed third in 2:06:47. The race was won by his compatriot Guye Adola in 2:05:45, while Kenya's Bethwel Yegon finished second. In November, he finished six at the 2021 New York City Marathon with a time of 2:12:52.

2022 - 2023

In September, he placed third at the Great North Run half marathon in a time of 1:01:01. The next month, Kenenisa competed in the 2022 London Marathon, finishing fifth in 2:05:53 to set a masters world record in age 40 group. In April, he took part in the London Marathon but withdrew from the race after 25k mark. Then, in October, he announced on Instagram that he had departed from the NN running team and transitioned his sponsorship from Nike to Anta, a Chinese sports brand. In December, Kenenisa took part in the Valencia Marathon. Although he fell behind the leading group before reaching the 15 km mark, he managed to finish fourth in a M40 Master World Record with a time of 2:04:19. This achievement solidifies him as the first athlete aged over 40 to complete a marathon in sub 2:05 clocking.

==== 2024 ====
The 41-year-old Kenenisa competed in the London Marathon on 21 April 2024, where he finished second behind Alexander Munyao breaking his own Masters record by 4 seconds running 2:04:15. Kenenisa was selected to represent Ethiopia in the marathon at the 2024 Summer Olympics. At 41 years of age, it was his fourth Olympic appearance and first time competing at the event since the 2012 London Olympics. Kenenisa ended up finishing in 39th place with a time of 2:12:24

== Personal life ==
On 18 November 2007, Kenenisa married Ethiopian film actress Danawit Gebregziabher in Addis Ababa. Kenenisa has one younger brother, Tariku Bekele, who is also an accomplished world-class distance runner.

== Statistics ==
=== Personal bests ===
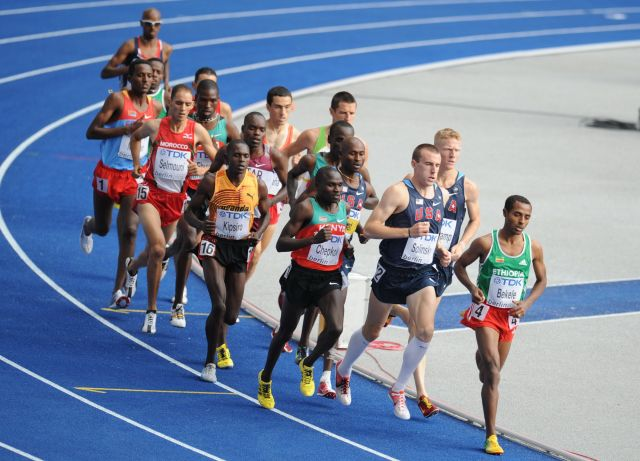
Kenenisa leading the 5000 m at the 2009 World Championships

Type	Distance	Time (min)	Date	Location	Notes
Track	1500 m	3:32.35	28 September 2007	Shanghai, China	
Track	Mile run indoors	4:01.57	3 February 2006	New York City, United States	
Track	2000 m indoors	4:49.99	17 February 2007	Birmingham, United Kingdom	Area best
Track	3000 m	7:25.79	7 August 2007	Stockholm, Sweden	
Track	3000 m indoors	7:30.51	20 February 2007	Stockholm, Sweden	
Track	Two miles	8:13.51	26 May 2007	Hengelo, Netherlands	
Track	Two miles indoors	8:04.35	16 February 2008	Birmingham, United Kingdom	African best
Track	5000 m	12:37.35	31 May 2004	Hengelo, Netherlands	WR and AR until 14 August 2020, broken by Joshua Cheptegei NR until 30 May 2024, broken by Hagos Gebrhiwet
Track	5000 m indoors	12:49.60	20 February 2004	Birmingham, United Kingdom	WR until 14 February 2025, broken by Grant Fisher
Track	10,000 m	26:17.53	26 August 2005	Brussels, Belgium	NR
Road	10 km	27:49	15 April 2012	Dublin, Ireland	
Road	15 km	42:42	9 December 2001	's-Heerenberg, Netherlands	
Road	Half marathon	1:00:22	1 March 2020	London, United Kingdom	Big Half course record
Road	Marathon	2:01:41	29 September 2019	Berlin, Germany	NR
Road	Marathon	2:04:15	3 December 2023	London, England	Masters world record (M 40 group)

=== Yearly progression ===
5000 metres
Year	Best	Location	Date	World rank
2012	12:55.79	Paris	6 July	9th
2009	12:52.32	Zürich	28 August	1st
2008	12:50.18	Zürich	29 August	1st
2007	12:49.53	Zaragoza	28 July	1st
2006	12:48.09	Brussels	25 August	1st
2005	12:40.18	Paris	1 July	1st
2004	12:37.35	Hengelo	31 May	1st
2003	12:52.26	Oslo	27 June	3rd
2002	13:26.58	Milan	5 June	71st
2001	13:13.33	Seville	8 June	29th
2000	13:20.57	Rieti	3 September	53rd

10,000 metres
Year	Best	Location	Date	World rank
2012	27:02.59	Birmingham	22 June	3rd
2011	26:43.16	Brussels	16 September	1st
2009	26:46.31	Berlin	17 August	1st
2008	26:25.97	Eugene	8 June	1st
2007	26:46.19	Brussels	14 September	1st
2005	26:17.53	Brussels	26 August	1st
2004	26:20.31	Ostrava	8 June	1st
2003	26:49.57	Paris	25 August	4th

== Competition record ==
=== International competitions ===
- Note: XC stands for cross country

Year	Competition	Venue	Position	Event	Result
Representing Ethiopia
1999	World XC Championships	Belfast, United Kingdom	9th	Junior race (8.012 km)	26:27
1999	World Youth Championships	Bydgoszcz, Poland	2nd	3000 m	8:09.89
2000	World Junior Championships	Santiago, Chile	2nd	5000 m	13:45.43
2001	World XC Championships	Ostend, Belgium	2nd	Short race (4.1 km)	12:42
2001	World XC Championships	Ostend, Belgium	1st	Junior race (7.7 km)	25:04
2002	World XC Championships	Dublin, Ireland	1st	Short race (4.208 km)	12:11
2002	World XC Championships	Dublin, Ireland	1st	Long race (11.998 km)	34:52
2003	World XC Championships	Lausanne, Switzerland	1st	Short race (4.03 km)	11:01
2003	World XC Championships	Lausanne, Switzerland	1st	Long race (12.355 km)	35:56
2003	World Championships in Athletics	Paris, France	3rd	5000 m	12:53.12
2003	World Championships in Athletics	Paris, France	1st	10,000 m	26:49.57
2003	All-Africa Games	Abuja, Nigeria	1st	5000 m	13:26.16
2004	World XC Championships	Brussels, Belgium	1st	Short race (4 km)	11:31
2004	World XC Championships	Brussels, Belgium	1st	Long race (12 km)	35:52
2004	Olympic Games	Athens, Greece	2nd	5000 m	13:14.59
2004	Olympic Games	Athens, Greece	1st	10,000 m	27:05.10
2005	World XC Championships	Saint-Galmier, France	1st	Short race (4.196 km)	11:33
2005	World XC Championships	Saint-Galmier, France	1st	Long race (12.02 km)	35:06
2005	World Championships in Athletics	Helsinki, Finland	1st	10,000 m	27:08.33
2006	World Indoor Championships	Moscow, Russia	1st	3000 m	7:39.32
2006	World XC Championships	Fukuoka, Japan	1st	Short race (4 km)	10:54
2006	World XC Championships	Fukuoka, Japan	1st	Long race (12 km)	35:40
2006	African Championships	Bambous, Mauritius	1st	5000 m	14:03.41
2006	IAAF World Cup	Athens, Greece	2nd	3000 m	7:36.25
2007	World XC Championships	Mombasa, Kenya	—	Senior race (12 km)	DNF
2007	World Championships in Athletics	Osaka, Japan	1st	10,000 m	27:05.90
2008	World XC Championships	Edinburgh, United Kingdom	1st	Senior race (12 km)	34:38
2008	African Championships	Addis Ababa, Ethiopia	1st	5000 m	13:49.67
2008	Olympic Games	Beijing, China	1st	5000 m	12:57.82
2008	Olympic Games	Beijing, China	1st	10,000 m	27:01.17
2009	World Championships in Athletics	Berlin, Germany	1st	5000 m	13:17.09
2009	World Championships in Athletics	Berlin, Germany	1st	10,000 m	26:46.31
2011	World Championships in Athletics	Daegu, South Korea	—	10,000 m	DNF
2012	Olympic Games	London, United Kingdom	4th	10,000 m	27:32.44
2024	Olympic Games	Paris, France	39th	Marathon	2:12:24

=== Marathons ===
Year	Competition	Venue	Position	Event	Result
2014	Paris Marathon	Paris, France	1st	Marathon	2:05:04
2014	Chicago Marathon	Chicago, United States	4th	Marathon	2:05:51
2015	Dubai Marathon	Dubai, United Arab Emirates	DNF	Marathon	DNF
2016	London Marathon	London, United Kingdom	3rd	Marathon	2:06:36
2016	Berlin Marathon	Berlin, Germany	1st	Marathon	2:03:03
2017	Dubai Marathon	Dubai, United Arab Emirates	DNF	Marathon	DNF
2017	London Marathon	London, United Kingdom	2nd	Marathon	2:05:57
2017	Berlin Marathon	Berlin, Germany	DNF	Marathon	DNF
2018	London Marathon	London, United Kingdom	6th	Marathon	2:08:53
2018	Amsterdam Marathon	Amsterdam, Netherlands	DNF	Marathon	DNF
2019	Berlin Marathon	Berlin, Germany	1st	Marathon	2:01:41
2020	London Marathon	London, United Kingdom	DNS	Marathon	DNS
2021	Berlin Marathon	Berlin, Germany	3rd	Marathon	2:06:47
2021	New York Marathon	New York, United States	6th	Marathon	2:12:52
2022	London Marathon	London, United Kingdom	5th	Marathon	2:05:53
2023	London Marathon	London, United Kingdom	DNF	Marathon	DNF
2023	Valencia Marathon	Valencia, Spain	4th	Marathon	2:04:19
2024	London Marathon	London, United Kingdom	2nd	Marathon	2:04:15 MWR
2024	Olympic Games	Paris, France	39th	Marathon	2:12:24
2024	Valencia Marathon	Valencia, Spain	DNF	Marathon	DNF
2025	New York City Marathon	New York, United States	DNF	Marathon	

=== World Grand Prix Finals (World Athletics Finals) ===
Year	Competition	Venue	Position	Event	Result
2001	Grand Prix Final	Melbourne, Australia	2nd	3000 m	7:54.39
2003	World Athletics Final	Monaco, Monaco	1st	3000 m	7:36.98
2006	World Athletics Final	Stuttgart, Germany	1st	5000 m	13:48.62
2009	World Athletics Final	Thessaloniki, Greece	1st	3000 m	8:03.79

=== World Marathon Majors results timeline ===
World Marathon Majors	2014	2015	2016	2017	2018	2019	2020	2021	2022	2023	2024
Tokyo Marathon	–	–	–	–	–	–	–	–	–	–	–
Boston Marathon	–	–	–	–	–	–	–	–	–	–	–
London Marathon	–	–	3rd	2nd	6th	–	DNS	–	5th	DNF	2nd
Berlin Marathon	–	–	1st	DNF	–	1st	–	3rd	–	–	–
Chicago Marathon	4th	–	–	–	–	–	–	–	–	–	–
New York Marathon	–	–	–	–	–	–	–	6th	–	–	–

=== Circuit honours ===
- IAAF Golden League jackpot winner: 2006, 2009
- Montferland Run 15K: 2000, 2001
- Giro al Sas 11K: 2001
- Memorial Peppe Greco 10K: 2003

Cross country wins

- Tilburg Warandeloop: 2000
- Cinque Mulini: 2002
- Lotto Cross Cup Brussels: 2002
- Oeiras International Cross Country: 2002, 2003
- Campaccio: 2002, 2004
- Cross Internacional Juan Muguerza: 2003
- Trofeo Alasport: 2003
- Cross Internacional de Itálica: 2003, 2004, 2007
- Cross Internacional de Venta de Baños: 2004
- Great Edinburgh International Cross Country: 2006, 2007, 2008 fing 2001

Me zedi.gmainet

== Awards ==
- IAAF World Athlete of the Year: 2004, 2005
- Track & Field News Athlete of the Year: 2004, 2005
- Ethiopian Person of the Year: 2007/2008
- ESPN Africa's best athlete of the 21st century

Records
Preceded by Haile Gebrselassie	Men's 10,000 m World Record Holder; 8 June 2004 – 7 October 2020	Succeeded by Joshua Cheptegei
Preceded by Haile Gebrselassie	Men's 5000 m World Record Holder; 31 May 2004 – 14 August 2020	Succeeded by Joshua Cheptegei
Awards and achievements
Preceded by Hicham El Guerrouj	Men's Track & Field Athlete of the Year; 2004–2005	Succeeded by Asafa Powell
Sporting positions
Preceded by Stephen Cherono	Men's 5000 m Best Year Performance; 2004–2009	Succeeded by Eliud Kipchoge
Preceded by Haile Gebrselassie; Micah Kogo	Men's 10,000 m Best Year Performance; 2004–2005; 2007–2009	Succeeded by Micah Kogo; Josphat Kiprono Menjo
Preceded by Isaac Kiprono Songok	Men's 3000 m Best Year Performance; 2007	Succeeded by Edwin Cheruiyot Soi
