= Ryuji Ono =

Japanese long-distance runner

Personal information
- Nationality: Japanese
- Born: 27 January 1985 (age 41)

Sport
- Sport: Long-distance running
- Event: 10,000 metres

Ryuji Ono (大野 龍二, Ōno Ryūji; born 27 January 1985) is a Japanese long-distance runner. He competed in the men's 10,000 metres at the 2004 Summer Olympics.
