= Moses Mosop =

Kenyan runner (born 1985)

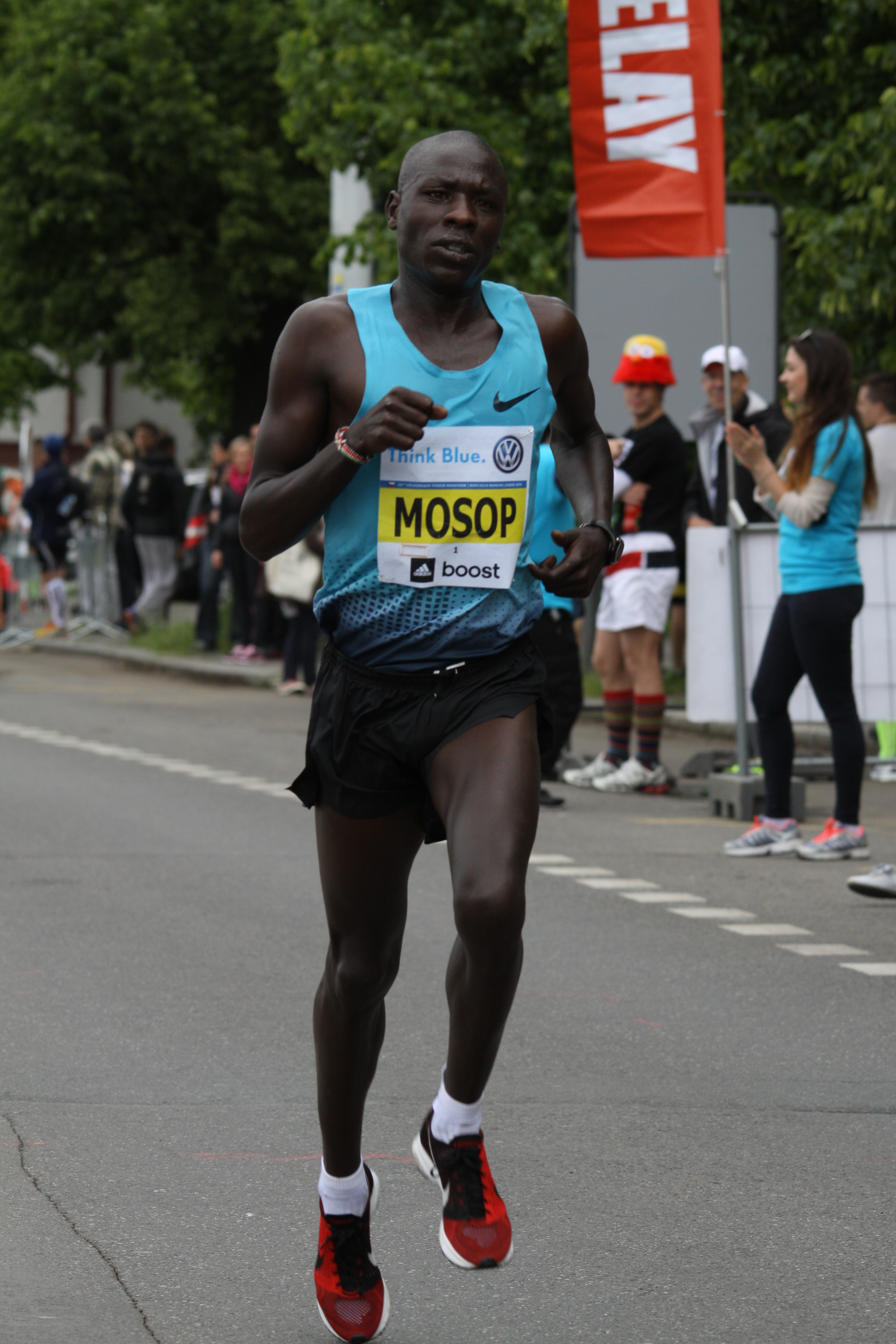
- Mosop during Prague International Marathon in 2014

Personal information
- Full name: Moses Cheruiyot Mosop (Kimosop)
- Born: 7 July 1985 (age 41) Kamasia, Marakwet District, Rift Valley Province, Kenya
- Height: 152 cm (5 ft 0 in)
- Weight: 50 kg (110 lb)
Medal record
Men's athletics
Representing Kenya
World Championships
Bronze medal – third place	2005 Helsinki	10,000 m
World Cross Country Championships
Gold medal – first place	2007 Mombasa	Team
Gold medal – first place	2009 Amman	Team
Silver medal – second place	2007 Mombasa	Individual
- Updated on 16 June 2015

Moses Cheruiyot Mosop (born 7 July 1985) is a Kenyan middle and long distance athlete. He competed for Kenya at the 2004 Olympic Games and went on to take 10,000 metres bronze at the 2005 World Championships in Athletics. He has also been successful in cross country running, having won the silver at the 2007 IAAF World Cross Country Championships as well as team gold with Kenya in 2007 and 2009.

Until 30 September 2014, Mosop was managed by Jos Hermens and coached by Renato Canova. At the 2011 Boston Marathon, Mosop and countryman Geoffrey Mutai ran what at the time were the fastest times ever recorded for a marathon – 2:03:06 and 2:03:02, respectively – bettering the Boston course record by nearly three minutes.

== Career ==
=== Early running ===
Born in Kamasia, Marakwet District, Mosop started running while at primary school and later went to Marakwet High School. He qualified for the 2002 IAAF World Cross Country Championships held in Belfast, where he finished tenth in the junior race. It was in this occasion that he joined the management of the Italian Gianni Demadonna, and started to be coached by Renato Canova, that developed his talent from the youth category up to the current international level.

At the 2002 IAAF World Cross Country Championships in Lausanne he fared slightly better, finishing 7th in the junior race. At the 2003 All-Africa Games, he was fifth in men's 10,000 metres. He made his Olympic debut at the 2004 Athens Olympics and was seventh overall in the 10,000 metres final. Mosop also won the Giro Podistico di Pettinengo 9.6 km race in 2004.

He was the winner of the Almond Blossom Cross Country in March 2005 and placed 18th at the 2005 IAAF World Cross Country Championships soon after. Competing in the 10,000 metres in the 2005 World Championships, he won the bronze medal, setting a personal best of 27:08.96 minutes. He occasionally runs the 3000 and 5000 metres and holds personal bests of 7:36 min and 12:54 min in those events.

He headed further up the podium at the 2007 IAAF World Cross Country Championships. He finished second in the senior race and took the team gold with Kenya. He took back-to-back wins at the Giro al Sas 10K race in 2007 and 2008. In March 2009 he won the Cross di Alà dei Sardi in Sardinia. He returned to world competition two years later, but he could not repeat his medal form at the 2009 World Cross Country Championships (finishing in eleventh place), although he still won team gold with Kenya.

Mosop won the men's race at the 2010 Stramilano Half Marathon, clocking 59:20 for the win over Silas Kipruto. His coach stated that Mosop was progressing as a road runner and might make a move to the marathon distance. Attempting to defend his title at the Giro Media Blenio 10K (which he won in 2009), he finished second in a sprint finish just behind Imane Merga. He was chosen for the Kenyan team at the 2010 IAAF World Half Marathon Championships and he finished in tenth place. At the Zevenheuvelenloop 15K race, he was off the pace and finished sixth – almost two minutes behind Leonard Patrick Komon who set a world record.

=== 2011: Marathon debut and world records ===
His first race of 2011 was the Paris Half Marathon, where he finished second behind Stephen Kibet. On 2011-04-18, he ran his marathon debut at the Boston Marathon, coming second in a time of 2:03:06. He and fellow countryman Geoffrey Mutai ran what at the time were the fastest times ever recorded for a marathon, shattering the time of the then existing world record (2:03:59 by Haile Gebrselassie) by nearly one minute, and the Boston course record by nearly three minutes. Helped by ideal cool temperatures and a strong tailwind on the point-to-point course, the lead pack reached the halfway mark on record pace of 1:01:54. The two Kenyans broke away from the pack at 30 kilometres and ran stride-for-stride over the last 12 kilometres until a sprint in the final straight-away by Mutai gave him the victory by four seconds, 2:03:02 to 2:03:06.

Because Boston is a point-to-point course, with an overall downhill slope, the times were not officially recognised. The IAAF rules essentially require marathon records to be established on a loop course (thereby neutralising the impact of wind and course elevation changes). The previous record at Boston was 2:05:52, set in 2010 by Robert Kiprono Cheruiyot who was the first to break 2:06 at Boston, while the current world record (yet to be ratified) is 2:02:57, run by Dennis Kimetto at Berlin in 2014.

As part of the 2011 Prefontaine Classic, Mosop was selected in an attempt to break the world record for the infrequently contested 30,000 m on the track. He shattered Toshihiko Seko's thirty-year-old world record by over two and a half minutes, running a time of 1:26:47.4 hours. He also smashed Seko's 25,000 m record by a minute and a half, passing the 25K intermediate mark at 1:12:25.4 hours. He stepped down in distance to run at the B.A.A. 10K in June and took third place on the podium.

9 October 2011, Mosop won the Chicago Marathon with a time of 2:05:37, beating Sammy Wanjiru's course record by four seconds. At the start of 2012, he was sixth at the Paris Half Marathon in preparation for the Rotterdam Marathon the following month. He was the pre-race favourite and attempted to break the marathon world record, but fell behind Yemane Tsegay and Getu Feleke, eventually finishing with a time of 2:05:03 hours. Nevertheless, he was selected for the Kenyan Olympic marathon team, but a tendon injury forced him to withdraw and he was replaced by Emmanuel Mutai.

== Personal life ==
In 2005 Mosop was reported to be married with Rose Cheruiyot (not the runner of the same name) with one daughter. By 2010 he was married to fellow runner Florence Kiplagat, with whom he has daughter Aisha. His brothers Elias Mosop and Philemon Mosop are also runners.

== Personal bests ==
Event	Time (h:m:s)	Venue	Date
5000 m	12:54.46	Saint-Denis, France	8 July 2006
10,000 m	26:49.55	Hengelo, Netherlands	26 May 2007
Half marathon	59:20	Milan, Italy	21 March 2010
25,000 m	1:12:25.4 WR	Eugene, USA	3 June 2011
30,000 m	1:26:47.4 WR	Eugene, USA	3 June 2011
Marathon*	2:03:06	Boston, USA	18 April 2011
Marathon	2:05:03	Rotterdam, Netherlands	15 April 2012

(*) Downhill and point-to-point course

- All information taken from IAAF profile.

== International competitions ==
Year	Competition	Venue	Position	Event	Notes
2002	World Cross Country Championships	Dublin, Ireland	10th	Junior race	
2003	World Cross Country Championships	Lausanne, Switzerland	7th	Junior race	
2003	All-Africa Games	Abuja, Nigeria	5th	10,000 m	
2004	Olympic Games	Athens, Greece	7th	10,000 m	
2005	World Cross Country Championships	St Etienne, France	18th	Long race	
2005	World Championships	Helsinki, Finland	3rd	10,000 m	
2007	World Cross Country Championships	Mombasa, Kenya	2nd	Long race	
2007	World Cross Country Championships	Mombasa, Kenya	1st	Team	
2009	World Cross Country Championships	Amman, Jordan	11th	Long race	
2009	World Cross Country Championships	Amman, Jordan	1st	Team	

== Marathons ==
Year	Competition	Venue	Position	Notes
2011	Boston Marathon	Boston, United States	2nd	2:03.06 second fastest time ever (unratified)
2011	Chicago Marathon	Chicago, United States	1st	2:05.37 course record
2012	Rotterdam Marathon	Rotterdam, Netherlands	3rd	2:05.03
2013	Chicago Marathon	Chicago, United States	8th	2:11.19
2015	Xiamen International Marathon	Xiamen, People's Republic of China	1st	2:06.19
2016	Yellow River Estuary International Marathon	Dongying, People's Republic of China	3rd	2:09.33
