= Sileshi Sihine =

Ethiopian former long-distance runner (born 1983)

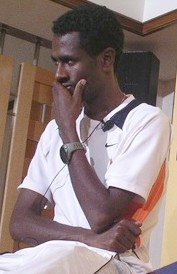
- Sileshi Sihine at a press conference at the 2007 World Championships in Athletics

Personal information
- Native name: ስለሺ ስህኔ
- Nationality: Ethiopian
- Born: 29 January 1983 (age 43) Sheno, Shewa, Ethiopia
- Height: 1.65 m (5 ft 5 in)
- Weight: 48 kg (106 lb)
- Spouse: Tirunesh Dibaba (m. 2008)
- Children: 2

Sport
- Country: Ethiopia
- Sport: Men's athletics
- Events: 10000 metres 5000 metres
- Retired: 2015
Medal record
Olympic Games
Silver medal – second place	2004 Athens	10,000 metres
Silver medal – second place	2008 Beijing	10,000 metres
World Championships
Silver medal – second place	2005 Helsinki	5000 metres
Silver medal – second place	2005 Helsinki	10,000 meters
Silver medal – second place	2007 Osaka	10,000 metres
Bronze medal – third place	2003 Paris	10,000 metres
World Cross Country Championships
Silver medal – second place	2006 Fukuoka	Long race
Bronze medal – third place	2004 Brussels	Long race
All-Africa Games
Gold medal – first place	2003 Abuja	10000 m

President of Ethiopian Athletic Federation
- Incumbent
- Assumed office 22 December 2024
- Preceded by: Derartu Tulu
- In office 4 February 2015 – 6 November 2016
- Succeeded by: Haile Gebrselassie

Sileshi Sihine (Amharic: ስለሺ ስህኔ; born 29 January 1983) is an Ethiopian retired long-distance runner. He is currently the president of the Ethiopian Athletic Federation since 2024, holding the title twice after serving from 2015 to 2016.

Sileshi won silver medals in the 10,000 metres at both the 2004 Athens Olympics and the 2008 Beijing Olympics as well as at the 2005 World Championships and 2007 World Championships as well as a bronze medal in 2003. He also picked up a silver medal in the 5,000 m event at the 2005 World Championships.

== Career ==
=== Junior career ===
Sileshi began running at school, inspired by the achievements of compatriot Haile Gebrselassie.

After success at the junior level, he emerged as a leading senior athlete.

=== 2002-2003 ===
In cross country, he won the Cross Internacional de Venta de Baños in 2002 and 2003.

Sileshi was one of three Ethiopians, along with Kenenisa Bekele and Gebrselassie, who swept the 10,000 metres gold, silver, and bronze medals at the 2003 World Championships in Paris. Sihine then won the 10,000 metres at the 2003 Afro-Asian Games.

=== 2004 ===
Sileshi won a bronze medal at the World Cross Country Championships. He also won a silver medal in the 10,000 metres at the Summer Olympic Gamess in Athens, behind Bekele.

=== 2005 ===
Sileshi won a silver medal in the 10,000 metres, behind Bekele, and the silver medal in the 5,000 metres at the World Championships in Helsinki, Finland.

=== 2006 ===
At the World Cross Country Championships, Sileshi finished second behind Bekele.

=== 2007 ===
At the World Championships in Osaka, Sileshi took the silver medal in the 10,000 metres, again finishing behind Bekele.

=== 2008 ===
He yet again took a silver medal in the 10,000 metres behind Bekele at the Summer Olympic Games in Beijing, China.

=== 2011 ===
In May, Sileshi finished fifth in the 5000 metres at the Samsung DL Golden Gala in Rome, Italy.

Nine days later at the Prefontaine Classic 10,000 metres in Eugene, Oregon, he finished in sixth place, 6.27 seconds behind winner Mohamed Farah.

Sileshi attempted his first marathon race at the Amsterdam Marathon, but dropped out after 36 kilometres.

=== 2012 ===
On 7 June, Sileshi finished seventh in the 5000 metres at the ExxonMobil Bislett Games in Oslo, Norway. Two weeks later at a 10 kilometre road race in Birmingham, U.K., Sihine finished fourth, just 1.06 seconds behind Bekele, the winner.

=== 2015 ===
In February, he was elected president of the newly formed Ethiopian Athletics Association.

=== 2024 ===
On 22 December 2024, he was reelected as the Ethiopian Athletics Association, succeeding Derartu Tulu, at 28th General Assembly of the Ethiopian Athletics Federation. Tulu's replacement was due to heavy backlash at the federation during the 2024 Paris Olympic.

== Personal life ==
In 2008, Sileshi is married to three-time Olympic champion athlete Tirunesh Dibaba. Their wedding was broadcast live on national television.

== Achievements ==
Year	Competition	Venue	Position	Event	Notes
Representing Ethiopia
2002	World Junior Championships	Kingston, Jamaica	2nd	10,000 metres	29:03.74
2003	World Championships	Paris, France	3rd	10,000 metres	27:01.44
2003	All-Africa Games	Abuja, Nigeria	1st	10,000 metres	27:42.13
2003	Afro-Asian Games	Hyderabad, India	1st	10,000 metres	27:48.40
2004	Olympic Games	Athens, Greece	2nd	10,000 metres	27:09.39
2004	IAAF World Athletics Final	Monte Carlo, Monaco	1st	5,000 metres	13:06.95
2005	World Championships	Helsinki, Finland	2nd	5,000 metres	13:32.81
2005	World Championships	Helsinki, Finland	2nd	10,000 metres	27:08.87
2005	World Half Marathon Championships	Edmonton, Canada	4th	Half marathon	1:01:14
2007	World Championships	Osaka, Japan	2nd	10,000 metres	27:09.03
2008	Olympic Games	Beijing, China	2nd	10,000 metres	27:02.77

== Personal bests ==
The following are his personal bests:

Surface	Event	Time (m:s)	Venue	Date
Outdoor track	3000 metres	7:29.92	Rieti, Italy	28 August 2005
Outdoor track	5000 metres	12:47.04	Rome, Italy	2 July 2004
Outdoor track	10,000 metres	26:39.69	Hengelo, Netherlands	31 May 2004
Road	10 kilometres	27:56	Nijmegen, Netherlands	21 November 2004
Road	15 kilometres	41:38	Nijmegen, Netherlands	21 November 2004
Road	20 kilometres	58:09	Edmonton, Canada	1 October 2005
Road	Half marathon	1:01:14	Edmonton, Canada	1 October 2005
Indoor	3000 metres	7;41.18	Stuttgart, Germany	31 January 2004
Indoor	Two miles	8:27.03	Boston, U.S.	28 January 2006
Indoor	5000 metres	13:06.72	Stockholm, Sweden	2 February 2006

Sporting positions
Preceded by (Kenya) Richard Yatich	Men's Zevenheuvelenloop Winner (15 km); 2004	Succeeded by (Ethiopia) Haile Gebrselassie
