= Boniface Toroitich Kiprop =

Ugandan long-distance runner

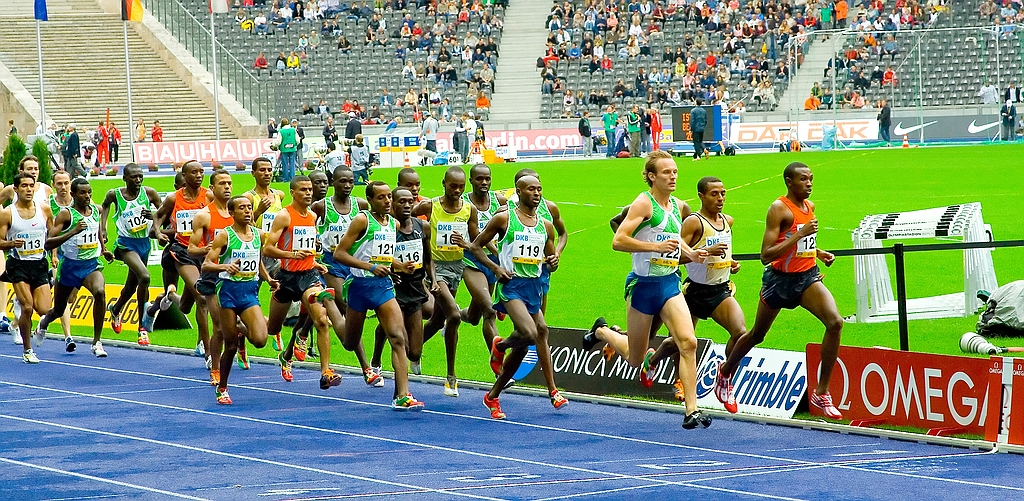
- Kiprop, wearing number 116

Personal information
- Born: 12 October 1985 (age 40) Kapchorwa District, Uganda

Sport
- Sport: Track and field
- Events: 5000 metres, 10,000 metres
Medal record
Men's athletics
Representing Uganda
Commonwealth Games
Gold medal – first place	2006 Melbourne	10,000 m

Boniface Toroitich Kiprop (born 12 October 1985) is a Ugandan long-distance runner.

== Personal life ==
His older brother, Martin Toroitich, is also a runner who has competed at the IAAF World Cross Country Championships. Boniface Kiprop is coached by Giuseppe Giambrone.

== Career ==
At the 2001 African Junior Championships in Mauritius, he competed in the 5000 and 10000 metres, finishing 1st and 2nd respectively. Two years later, at the championships in Cameroon, he won both events. At the 2003 All-Africa Games,he finished 4th in 10000 metres and 6th in 5000 metres. At the 2003 World Championships in Paris, he missed the 5000 metres final but he went on to win a bronze medal in the 10,000 m at the 2003 Afro-Asian Games.

At the 2004 World Junior Championships in Athletics in Grosseto, Italy, he won the 10000 metres race and finished 5th in 5000 metres. He represented Uganda at the 2004 Summer Olympics, where he finished fourth in the 10,000 metres final. He again finished fourth at the 2005 World Championships but won a silver medal over 5000 metres at the 3rd IAAF World Athletics Final.

In 2006, he won the 10,000 metres race at the Commonwealth Games.

In August 2004, he set a new World Junior Record in the 10000 metres with a time of 27:04.00 at the Memorial Van Damme meeting in Brussels. The record was broken the following year by Samuel Wanjiru at the same meeting. Kiprop also holds Ugandan records in 3000, 5000 and 10000 metres.

At the 2007 All-Africa Games, he finished fifth in 10000 metres and later that year finished 10th at 10000 metres at the 2007 World Championships.

== See also ==
- Stephen Kiprotich
- Amos Omolo
