= List of flag bearers for Tanzania at the Olympics =

Tanzania at the Olympics
- IOC code: TAN
- NOC: Tanzania Olympic Committee
- Website: acnoen.franceolympique.com
- Medals: Gold 0 Silver 2 Bronze 0 Total 2

Summer appearances
- 1964; 1968; 1972; 1976; 1980; 1984; 1988; 1992; 1996; 2000; 2004; 2008; 2012; 2016; 2020; 2024

This is a list of flag bearers who have represented Tanzania at the Olympics.

Flag bearers carry the national flag of their country at the opening ceremony of the Olympic Games.

#	Event year	Season	Flag bearer	Sport
1	1972	Summer	Claver Kamanya	Athletics
2	1984	Summer	Michael Nassoro	Boxing
3	1988	Summer	Ikaji Salum	Athletics
4	1996	Summer	Ikaji Salum	Athletics
5	2000	Summer	Restituta Joseph	Athletics
6	2004	Summer	Restituta Joseph	Athletics
7	2008	Summer	Fabiano Joseph Naasi	Athletics
8	2012	Summer	Zakia Mrisho Mohamed	Athletics
9	2016	Summer	Andrew Thomas Mlugu	Judo
10	2020	Summer	Volunteer	–
11	2024	Summer	Sophia Latiff	Swimming
11	2024	Summer	Andrew Thomas Mlugu	Judo

== See also ==
- Tanzania at the Olympics
