= List of Tanzanian records in athletics =

The following are the national records in athletics in Tanzania maintained by Tanzania's national athletics federation: Athletics Tanzania (AT).

== Outdoor ==
Key to tables: Awaiting ratification Record not kept by AT Not ratified or later rescinded by AT

=== Men ===
| Event | Record | Athlete | Date | Meet | Place | Ref. |
|---|---|---|---|---|---|---|
| 100 m | 10.57 A | Norman Chihota | 13 October 1968 | Olympic Games | Mexico City, Mexico | |
| 100 m | 10.1 h | Jumane Chobanga | 28 October 1979 | | Songea, Tanzania | |
| 200 m | 21.27 (−0.1 m/s) | Ali Khamis Gulam | 16 September 2015 | African Games | Brazzaville, Republic of the Congo | |
| 200 m | 20.8 h | Makame Ally | 29 November 2004 | | Zanzibar, Tanzania | |
| 200 m | 21.0 h | David Lukuba | 22 September 1979 | | Songea, Tanzania | |
| 200 m | 21.0 h | Jumane Chobanga | 30 October 1979 | | Songea, Tanzania | |
| 200 m | 21.0 h | Mwalimu Ally | 30 October 1979 | | Songea, Tanzania | |
| 200 m | 21.0 h | Peter Mwita | 15 March 1980 | | Arusha, Tanzania | |
| 200 m | 21.0 h | Thomas Lubuva | 26 August 1983 | | Arusha, Tanzania | |
| 400 m | 45.74 A | Claver Kamanya | 16 October 1968 | Olympic Games | Mexico City, Mexico | |
| 800 m | 1:45.28 | Samwel Mwera | 15 May 2005 | | Rio de Janeiro, Brazil | |
| 1000 m | 2:17.85 | Samwel Mwera | 6 September 2003 | | Oristano, Italy | |
| 1500 m | 3:32.16 | Filbert Bayi | 2 February 1974 | British Commonwealth Games | Christchurch, New Zealand | |
| Mile | 3:51.0 h | Filbert Bayi | 17 May 1975 | | Kingston, Jamaica | |
| 3000 m | 7:39.27 | Filbert Bayi | 1 July 1980 | Bislett Games | Oslo, Norway | |
| 5000 m | 13:03.62 | John Yuda Msuri | 12 July 2002 | Golden Gala | Rome, Italy | |
| 5 km (road) | 13:36 | Andrew Sambu | 23 April 1995 | | London, United Kingdom | |
| 10,000 m | 27:06.17 | John Yuda Msuri | 30 August 2002 | Memorial Van Damme | Brussels, Belgium | |
| 10 km (road) | 27:37 | Emanuel Giniki Gisamoda | 7 October 2018 | Singelloop Utrecht | Utrecht, Netherlands | |
| 10 km (road) | 27:31 + | Benjamin Ratsim | 15 November 2026 | Zevenheuvelenloop | Nijmegen, Netherlands | |
| 15 km (road) | 41:26 | Benjamin Ratsim | 15 November 2026 | Zevenheuvelenloop | Nijmegen, Netherlands | |
| 20 km (road) | 56:57+ | Gabriel Geay | 21 February 2020 | Ras Al Khaimah Half Marathon | Emirate of Ras Al Khaimah, United Arab Emirates | |
| Half marathon | 59:18 | Gabriel Geay | 19 January 2025 | Houston Half Marathon | Houston, United States | |
| 25 km (road) | 1:11:52+ | Gabriel Geay | 3 December 2023 | Valencia Marathon | Valencia, Spain | |
| 30 km (road) | 1:26:27+ | Gabriel Geay | 3 December 2023 | Valencia Marathon | Valencia, Spain | |
| Marathon | 2:03:00 | Gabriel Geay | 4 December 2022 | Valencia Marathon | Valencia, Spain | |
| Marathon | 2:02:47 (Note: downhill point-to-point course) | Alphonce Simbu | 20 April 2026 | Boston Marathon | Boston, United States | |
| 110 m hurdles | 15.02 | Salum Hassan | 25 January 1974 | British Commonwealth Games | Christchurch, New Zealand | |
| 110 m hurdles | 14.05 (−0.3 m/s) (Note: Benson opted for Denmark) | Shujaa Benson | 17 April 2015 | Bryan Clay Invitational | Azusa, United States | |
| 400 m hurdles | 51.20 | Morris Okinda | 12 August 1985 | African Championships | Cairo, Egypt | |
| 3000 m steeplechase | 8:12.48 | Filbert Bayi | 31 July 1980 | Olympic Games | Moscow, Soviet Union | |
| High jump | 2.00 m | Masud Tawakali | 24 September 1978 | | Dar es Salaam, Tanzania | |
| Pole vault | 4.06 m | Wong Sang | 14 November 1970 | | Dar es Salaam, Tanzania | |
| Long jump | 7.63 m (+0.6 m/s) | Anthony Mwanga | 5 April 2019 | | Stellenbosch, South Africa | |
| Long jump | 7.84 m | Shujaa Benson | 17 May 2014 | | Lubbock, United States | |
| Triple jump | 15.92 m (+1.6 m/s) | Anthony Mwanga | 6 April 2019 | | Stellenbosch, South Africa | |
| Shot put | 15.47 m | Mohamed Ibrahim | 11/12 June 2016 | | Dar es Salaam, Tanzania | |
| Discus throw | 47.50 m | Ally Sefu | 22–24 July 2005 | | Arusha, Tanzania | |
| Hammer throw | 44.77 m | Joseph Muhaya | 16 August 1969 | | Kampala, Uganda | |
| Javelin throw | 76.48 m | Zakayo Malekwa | 10 May 1986 | | Arlington, United States | |
| Decathlon | 5627 pts h | Ernest Joseph | 2–3 December 1972 | | Dar es Salaam, Tanzania | |
| Decathlon | 100m (wind) / Long jump (wind) / Shot put / High jump / 400m / 110m H (wind) / Discus / Pole vault / Javelin / 1500m; 12.2 / 6.05 m / 10.02 m / 1.65 m / 51.5 / 16.4 / 32.40 m / 2.95 m / 40.14 m / 4:26.5 | | | | | |
| Decathlon | 6122 pts | Ernest Joseph | 16 May 1974 | | Dar es Salaam, Tanzania | |
| Decathlon | 100m (wind) / Long jump (wind) / Shot put / High jump / 400m / 110m H (wind) / Discus / Pole vault / Javelin / 1500m | | | | | |
| 20 km walk (road) | | | | | | |
| 50 km walk (road) | | | | | | |
| 4 × 100 m relay | 40.92 | Tanzania; J. Kwimba; Claver Kamanya; Nestor Rweyemamu; Norman Chihota | 31 January 1974 | British Commonwealth Games | Christchurch, New Zealand | |
| 4 × 400 m relay | 3:10.12 | Tanzania; Hamad Ndee; Omari Abdallah; Obed Mwanga; Claver Kamanya | 9 September 1972 | Olympic Games | Munich, West Germany | |

=== Women ===
| Event | Record | Athlete | Date | Meet | Place | Ref. |
|---|---|---|---|---|---|---|
| 100 m | 11.63 | Nzaeli Kyomo | 29 August 1989 | | Tampere, Finland | |
| 200 m | 23.92 NWI | Nzaeli Kyomo | 2 August 1979 | African Championships | Dakar, Senegal | |
| 400 m | 54.99 | Leticia Athanas | 7 August 1987 | All-Africa Games | Nairobi, Kenya | |
| 800 m | 1:59.58 | Lwiza John | 9 September 2000 | | Yokohama, Japan | |
| 1500 m | 4:09.71 | Anna Ndege | 6 July 2002 | | Cork, Ireland | |
| 3000 m | 8:39.91 | Zakia Mrisho Mohamed | 19 August 2005 | Weltklasse Zürich | Zürich, Switzerland | |
| 5000 m | 14:43.87 | Zakia Mrisho Mohamed | 13 August 2005 | World Championships | Helsinki, Finland | |
| 5 km (road) | 15:19 | Restituta Joseph | 14 May 2000 | | Kassel, Germany | |
| 10,000 m | 31:32.02 | Restituta Joseph | 13 June 1999 | | Villeneuve-d'Ascq, France | |
| 10 km (road) | 31:09+ | Magdalena Shauri | 21 February 2020 | Ras Al Khaimah Half Marathon | Emirate of Ras Al Khaimah, United Arab Emirates | |
| 10 km (road) | 31:09+ | Jackline Sakilu | 24 February 2024 | Ras Al Khaimah Half Marathon | Emirate of Ras Al Khaimah, United Arab Emirates | |
| 15 km (road) | 46:42+ | Jackline Sakilu | 24 February 2024 | Ras Al Khaimah Half Marathon | Emirate of Ras Al Khaimah, United Arab Emirates | |
| 20 km (road) | 1:02:38+ | Jackline Sakilu | 24 February 2024 | Ras Al Khaimah Half Marathon | Emirate of Ras Al Khaimah, United Arab Emirates | |
| Half marathon | 1:06:05 | Jackline Sakilu | 24 February 2024 | Ras Al Khaimah Half Marathon | Emirate of Ras Al Khaimah, United Arab Emirates | |
| 25 km (road) | 1:19:59+ Mx | Magdalena Shauri | 12 October 2025 | Chicago Marathon | Chicago, United States | |
| 30 km (road) | 1:36:12+ Mx | Magdalena Shauri | 12 October 2025 | Chicago Marathon | Chicago, United States | |
| Marathon | 2:18:03 Mx | Magdalena Shauri | 12 October 2025 | Chicago Marathon | Chicago, United States | |
| 100 m hurdles | 16.52 | Zulpha Muhammed | 20 May 1995 | | Nairobi, Kenya | |
| 400 m hurdles | 1:06.9 | Thea Antony | 16 November 2002 | | Dar es Salaam, Tanzania | |
| 3000 m steeplechase | | | | | | |
| High jump | 1.70 m | Adventina Matakyawa | 1980 | | Dar es Salaam, Tanzania | |
| Pole vault | | | | | | |
| Long jump | 5.64 m | Leticia Athanas | 2 May 1983 | | Mwanza, Tanzania | |
| Triple jump | 10.80 m | Rose Seif | 11/12 June 2016 | | Dar es Salaam, Tanzania | |
| Shot put | 12.90 m | Catherine Nyamko | October 1983 | | Dar es Salaam, Tanzania | |
| Discus throw | 35.90 m | Nancy Mtawali | 15 August 1971 | | Zanzibar City, Tanzania | |
| Hammer throw | | | | | | |
| Javelin throw | 47.33 m A | Mwanaamina Mkwayu | 30 April 2023 | African U20 Championships | Ndola, Zambia | |
| Heptathlon | | | | | | |
| Heptathlon | 100m H (wind) / High jump / Shot put / 200m (wind) / Long jump (wind) / Javelin / 800m | | | | | |
| 20 km walk (road) | | | | | | |
| 50 km walk (road) | | | | | | |
| 4 × 100 m relay | 46.43 | Tanzania; R. Mfanya; M. Mohamed; P. Cheri; Nzaeli Kyomo | 2 February 1974 | British Commonwealth Games | Christchurch, New Zealand | |
| 4 × 400 m relay | 3:53.7 | Tanzania; Lwiza John; Pendo Japhet; Blanka James; B. Genatus | 6 July 2003 | | Zanzibar City, Tanzania | |

== Indoor ==
=== Men ===
| Event | Record | Athlete | Date | Meet | Place | Ref. |
|---|---|---|---|---|---|---|
| 60 m | | | | | | |
| 200 m | 22.35 | Christopher Nibilo | 9 March 1991 | World Championships | Seville, Spain | |
| 400 m | 48.40 | Christopher Nibilo | 8 March 1991 | World Championships | Seville, Spain | |
| 800 m | 1:48.04 | Samwel Mwera | 15 February 2005 | | Stockholm, Sweden | |
| 1500 m | 3:40.3+ | Filbert Bayi | 22 February 1980 | | San Diego, United States | |
| 3000 m | 7:47.4+ | Suleiman Nyambui | 17 February 1978 | | San Diego, United States | |
| 5000 m | 13:20.4 h | Suleiman Nyambui | 6 February 1981 | Millrose Games | New York City, United States | |
| 60 m hurdles | | | | | | |
| High jump | | | | | | |
| Pole vault | | | | | | |
| Long jump | | | | | | |
| Triple jump | | | | | | |
| Shot put | | | | | | |
| Heptathlon | | | | | | |
| Heptathlon | 60m / Long jump / Shot put / High jump / 60m H / Pole vault / 1000m | | | | | |
| 5000 m walk | | | | | | |
| 4 × 400 m relay | | | | | | |

=== Women ===
| Event | Record | Athlete | Date | Meet | Place | Ref. |
|---|---|---|---|---|---|---|
| 60 m | | | | | | |
| 200 m | | | | | | |
| 400 m | | | | | | |
| 800 m | 2:01.74 | Lwiza John | 25 February 2001 | Meeting Pas de Calais | Liévin, France | |
| 1500 m | 4:12.24+ | Zakia Mrisho | 8 February 2009 | Indoor Flanders Meeting | Ghent, Belgium | |
| 3000 m | 8:51.23 | Restituta Joseph | 2 February 2003 | Sparkassen Cup | Stuttgart, Germany | |
| Two miles | 9:32.75 | Zakia Mrisho Mohamed | 26 February 2009 | | Prague, Czech Republic | |
| 5000 m | 15:04.73 | Restituta Joseph | 5 February 2003 | | Dortmund, Germany | |
| 60 m hurdles | | | | | | |
| High jump | | | | | | |
| Pole vault | | | | | | |
| Long jump | | | | | | |
| Triple jump | | | | | | |
| Shot put | | | | | | |
| Pentathlon | | | | | | |
| Pentathlon | 60m H / High jump / Shot put / Long jump / 800m | | | | | |
| 3000 m walk | | | | | | |
| 4 × 400 m relay | | | | | | |
