= Tanzania at the 2008 Summer Olympics =

- IOC code: TAN
- NOC: Tanzania Olympic Committee

in Beijing
- Competitors: 10 in 2 sports
- Flag bearer: Fabiano Joseph Naasi
- Medals: Gold 0 Silver 0 Bronze 0 Total 0

Summer Olympics appearances (overview)
- 1964; 1968; 1972; 1976; 1980; 1984; 1988; 1992; 1996; 2000; 2004; 2008; 2012; 2016; 2020; 2024

Tanzania competed in the 2008 Summer Olympics held in Beijing, People's Republic of China from August 8 to August 24, 2008.

== Athletics ==
Men

| Athlete | Event | Heat | | Semifinal | | Final | |
| Athlete | Event | Result | Rank | Result | Rank | Result | Rank |
|---|---|---|---|---|---|---|---|
| Getuli Bayo | Marathon | — | | | | DNF | |
| Dickson Marwa | 10000 m | — | | | | 27:48.03 | 14 |
| Mohamed Ikoki Msandeki | Marathon | — | | | | DNS | |
| Samwel Mwera | 800 m | 1:50.67 | 7 | Did not advance | | | |
| Fabiano Joseph Naasi | 10000 m | — | | | | 27:25.33 | 9 |
| Samson Ramadhani | Marathon | — | | | | 2:25:03 | 55 |
| Samwel Shauri | 10000 m | — | | | | 28:06.26 | 21 |

Women

| Athlete | Event | Heat | | Final | |
| Athlete | Event | Result | Rank | Result | Rank |
|---|---|---|---|---|---|
| Zakia Mrisho Mohamed | 5000 m | 15:24.28 | 12 | Did not advance | |

Key

- Note–Ranks given for track events are within the athlete's heat only
- Q = Qualified for the next round
- q = Qualified for the next round as a fastest loser or, in field events, by position without achieving the qualifying target
- NR = National record
- N/A = Round not applicable for the event
- Bye = Athlete not required to compete in round

== Swimming ==
Men

| Athlete | Event | Heat | | Semifinal | | Final | |
| Athlete | Event | Time | Rank | Time | Rank | Time | Rank |
|---|---|---|---|---|---|---|---|
| Khalid Rushaka | 50 m freestyle | 28.50 | 83 | Did not advance | | | |

Women

| Athlete | Event | Heat | | Semifinal | | Final | |
| Athlete | Event | Time | Rank | Time | Rank | Time | Rank |
|---|---|---|---|---|---|---|---|
| Magdalena Moshi | 50 m freestyle | 31.37 | 77 | Did not advance | | | |

== See also ==
- Tanzania at the 2006 Commonwealth Games
- Tanzania at the 2008 Summer Paralympics
- Tanzania at the 2010 Commonwealth Games
