= Tanzania at the 2016 Summer Olympics =

- IOC code: TAN
- NOC: Tanzania Olympic Committee

in Rio de Janeiro
- Competitors: 7 in 3 sports
- Flag bearers: Andrew Thomas Mlugu (opening); Alphonce Felix Simbu (closing)
- Medals: Gold 0 Silver 0 Bronze 0 Total 0

Summer Olympics appearances (overview)
- 1964; 1968; 1972; 1976; 1980; 1984; 1988; 1992; 1996; 2000; 2004; 2008; 2012; 2016; 2020; 2024; 2028

Tanzania competed at the 2016 Summer Olympics in Rio de Janeiro, Brazil, from 5 to 21 August 2016. Seven athletes, five men and two women, competed in five events across three sports, but did not win any medals. Hilal Hemed Hilal, however, set a new national record in the men's 50 m freestyle event. Four athletes took part in track and field athletics, all in marathons, while two participated in the swimming tournament's 50 m freestyle category. The flagbearer for the opening ceremony was Andrew Thomas Mlugu, who was Tanzania's first Olympic judoka. His counterpart in the closing ceremony was Alphonce Felix Simbu, who had earned the nation's best finish at the Games by placing fifth in the men's marathon. Prior to these Games, Tanzania had sent athletes to twelve editions of the Summer Olympics.

== Background ==
Since 1964, when it competed under the banner of Tanganyika, Tanzania had sent athletes to twelve editions of the Summer Olympic Games. On 7 July 2016, it became the first country to submit its official team for the 2016 Summer Olympics held in Rio de Janeiro, Brazil. The nation chose judoka Andrew Thomas Mlugu as its flagbearer in the opening ceremony. A total of seven Tanzanians, five men and two women, travelled to Rio de Janeiro and competed in three different sports: track and field, judo, and swimming. Alphonce Felix Simbu, who finished fifth in the men's marathon, was the nation's most successful competitor at the Games, and thus the nation failed to win its first Olympic medal since 1980. Nonetheless, he was selected to carry the Tanzanian flag at the closing ceremony.

== Athletics (track and field) ==
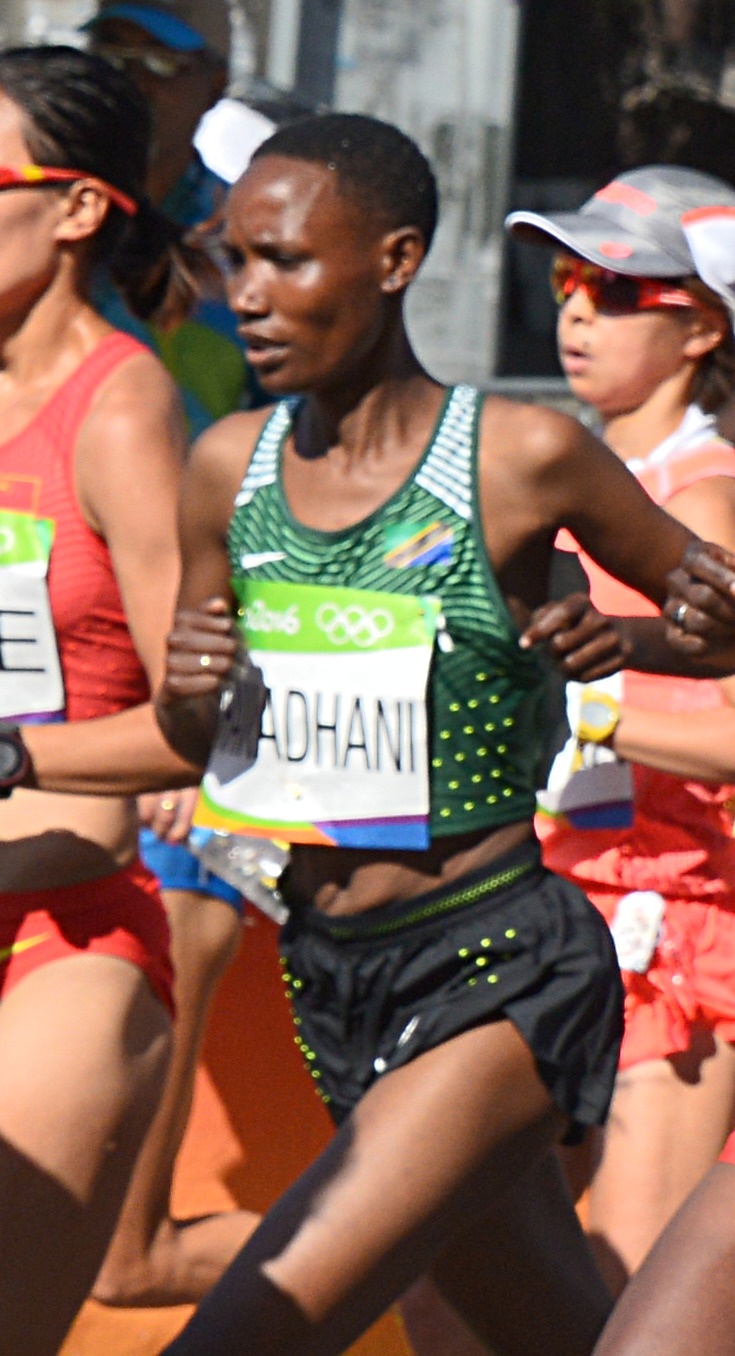
Sara Ramadhani competing in the women's marathon at the 2016 Summer Olympics.

Four Tanzanian athletes, three men and one woman, qualified for the Olympics, all in marathon events. The lone woman was Sara Ramadhani, whose three-year suspension from international competition for testing positive for banned substances at the 2014 Commonwealth Games ended in early 2016. She finished 121st out of 157 participants in the women's marathon. Of the three men, Fabiano Joseph Naasi was the only one with previous Olympic experience, having taken part in the 5000 and 10,000 m events at the 2004 Games and the 10,000 m in 2008. He had also won a bronze medal in the 10,000 m competition at the 2006 Commonwealth Games and was the World Half Marathon Champion in 2005. In Rio he was 112th out of 155 athletes in the men's marathon. Saidi Makula, who had competed in only two full marathons prior to the Olympics, fared better in 43rd place. Alphonce Felix Simbu, who had been 12th in the marathon at the 2015 World Championships in Athletics, placed fifth, one minute and ten seconds behind Galen Rupp of the United States, the bronze medalist, and 2 minutes, 31 seconds behind winner Eliud Kipchoge of Kenya.

Athlete	Event	Final	
Athlete	Event	Result	Rank
Saidi Makula	Men's marathon	2:17:49	43
Fabiano Joseph Naasi	Men's marathon	2:28:31	112
Alphonce Felix Simbu	Men's marathon	2:11:15	5
Sara Ramadhani	Women's marathon	3:00:03	121

== Judo ==
Tanzania competed in Olympic judo for the first time in 2016. The nation received an invitation from the Tripartite Commission to send one judoka to the Games in the men's 73 kg category and selected Andrew Thomas Mlugu. He had previous international experience from having competed at the 2014 Commonwealth Games. In Rio, Mlugu was defeated in his opening bout by Jake Bensted of Australia and eliminated from the tournament.

Athlete	Event	Round of 64	Round of 32	Round of 16	Quarterfinals	Semi-finals	Repechage	Final / BM	
Athlete	Event	Opposition Result	Opposition Result	Opposition Result	Opposition Result	Opposition Result	Opposition Result	Opposition Result	Rank
Andrew Thomas Mlugu	Men's −73 kg	Bye	Bensted (AUS); L 000–100	Did not advance					

Key: L = Competitor lost the match; Bye = Athlete not required to compete in round

== Swimming ==
Two Tanzanian swimmers, one male and one female, qualified for the Olympics. Hilal Hemed Hilal received a universality place, designated for nations with no athletes who met the qualification standards, to compete in the men's 50 m freestyle. Hilal took up competitive swimming in 2009 and was a member of the Taliss Swim Club. He had competed previously in the 50 m freestyle and the 50 m butterfly at the 2013 World Aquatics Championships, as well as the 50 m freestyle, butterfly, and backstroke at the Commonwealth Games. He had also won a bronze medal at the 2016 African Swimming Confederation Zone 4 Championships in the 50 m butterfly. In Rio, Hilal was placed in heat four and won it in a national record-setting time of 23.70, which was nearly a second ahead of his nearest competitor, Farhan Farhan of Bahrain. His time, however, was still too slow to qualify him for the semi-finals, as he was 49th overall and thus not among the top 16 overall finishers who advanced.

Magdalena Moshi also received a universality place for the women's 50 m freestyle, but failed to make the semi-finals at the Games, placing equal 67th (with Angelika Ouedraogo of Burkino Faso) overall. She had been placed in heat four, which was won by Colleen Furgeson of the Marshall Islands, and came in fifth with a time of 29.44. Born in Australia, but raised in Tanzania, she trained in the country of her birth and was a veteran of the 2008 and 2012 Summer Olympics as Tanzania's first female swimmer. This made her one of only two Tanzanian women to have competed in three editions of the Games as of 2016.

Athlete	Event	Heat		Semi-final		Final	
Athlete	Event	Time	Rank	Time	Rank	Time	Rank
Hilal Hemed Hilal	Men's 50 m freestyle	23.70 NR	49	Did not advance			
Magdalena Moshi	Women's 50 m freestyle	29.44	=67	Did not advance			

Key: NR = National record
