= Tanzania at the 1980 Summer Olympics =

- IOC code: TAN
- NOC: Tanzania Olympic Committee

in Moscow
- Competitors: 41 (36 men and 5 women) in 3 sports
- Medals Ranked 28th: Gold 0 Silver 2 Bronze 0 Total 2

Summer Olympics appearances (overview)
- 1964; 1968; 1972; 1976; 1980; 1984; 1988; 1992; 1996; 2000; 2004; 2008; 2012; 2016; 2020; 2024

Tanzania competed at the 1980 Summer Olympics in Moscow, USSR. The nation won its first ever Olympic medals at these Games.

== Medalists ==
Medal	Name	Sport	Event	Date
Silver	Suleiman Nyambui	Athletics	Men's 5000 m	1 Aug
Silver	Filbert Bayi	Athletics	Men's 3000 m steeplechase	31 July

== Athletics ==
Men
Track & road events

Athlete	Event	Heat		Quarterfinal		Semifinal		Final	
Athlete	Event	Result	Rank	Result	Rank	Result	Rank	Result	Rank
Mwalimu Ali	100 m	10.86	6	did not advance					
Mwalimu Ali	200 m	21.83	5	did not advance					
Zakariah Barie	5000 m	13:49.4	9 Q	—N/a		13:44.9	7	did not advance	
Zakariah Barie	10000 m	DNF		did not advance					
Filbert Bayi	3000 m steeplechase	8:21.4	1 Q	—N/a		8:16.2	1 Q	8:12.4	2nd place, silver medalist(s)
David Lukuba	100 m	10.74	5	did not advance					
David Lukuba	200 m	21.76	4	did not advance					
Musa Luliga	800 m	1:49.6	5 Q	—N/a		1:51.5	7	did not advance	
Leodigard Martin	10000 m	30:33.4	11	did not advance					
Leodigard Martin	Marathon	—N/a						2:18:21	23
Peter Mwita	100 m	11.07	6	did not advance					
Emmanuel Ndiemandoi	Marathon	—N/a						2:16:47	14
Suleiman Nyambui	5000 m	13:45.4	2 Q	—N/a		13:30.2	5 Q	13:21.6	2nd place, silver medalist(s)
Suleiman Nyambui	10000 m	DNS		did not advance					
Gidamis Shahanga	Marathon	—N/a						2:16:47	15

Field events

Athlete	Event	Qualification		Final	
Athlete	Event	Distance	Position	Distance	Position
Zakayo Malekwa	Javelin throw	71.58	16	did not advance	

Women
Track & road events

Athlete	Event	Heat		Quarterfinal		Semifinal		Final	
Athlete	Event	Result	Rank	Result	Rank	Result	Rank	Result	Rank
Mosi Alli	100 m	12.19	7	did not advance					
Mosi Alli	200 m	24.99	27	did not advance					
Marcellina Emmanuel	1500 m	4:26.78	11	did not advance					
Nzaeli Kyomo	100 m	11.77	6	did not advance					
Nzaeli Kyomo	200 m	24.22	23 q	24.59	8	did not advance			
Mwinga Mwanjala	800 m	2:05.2	5	did not advance					
Mwinga Mwanjala	1500 m	4:20.84	10	did not advance					
Lilian Nyiti	800 m	2:11.1	5	did not advance					

== Boxing ==
Men

Athlete	Event	1 Round	2 Round	3 Round	Quarterfinals	Semifinals	Final	
Athlete	Event	Opposition Result	Opposition Result	Opposition Result	Opposition Result	Opposition Result	Opposition Result	Rank
Emmanuel Mlundwa	Flyweight	—N/a	Talal Elchawa (SYR); W TKO-2	Hugh Russell (IRL); L 0-5	did not advance			
Geraldi Issaick	Bantamweight	BYE	Jorge Monar (BEN); W 3-2	Ganapathy Manoharan (IND); W TKO-2	Juan Hernández (CUB); L TKO-1	did not advance		5
Issack Mabushi	Featherweight	BYE	Barri McGuigan (IRL); L TKO-3	did not advance				
Omari Golaya	Lightweight	—N/a	Kalervo Alanenpää (SWE); W 5-0	Kazimierz Adach (POL); L 0-5	did not advance			
William Lyimo	Light Welterweight	—N/a	BYE	Khast Jamgan (MGL); W 5-0	Anthony Willis (GBR); L TKO-3	did not advance		5
Lucas Msomba	Welterweight	—N/a	Elio Diaz (VEN); W 4-1	Karl-Heinz Krüger (GDR); L 0-5	did not advance			
Leonidas Njunwa	Light Middleweight	—N/a	BYE	Imad Idriss (SYR); W TKO-3	Detlef Kästner (GDR); L 0-5	did not advance		5
Michael Nassoro	Light Heavyweight	—N/a		Slobodan Kacar (YUG); L TKO-2	did not advance			
William Isangura	Heavyweight	—N/a		Grzegorz Skrzecz (POL); L KO-1	did not advance			

== Field hockey ==
=== Men's Competition ===
Team Roster
- Leopold Gracias
- Benedict Mendes
- Soter da Silva
- Abraham Sykes
- Yusuf Manwar
- Singh Jaypal
- Mohamed Manji
- Rajabu Rajab
- Jasbir Virdee
- Islam Islam
- Pirbhai Erfan
- Hira Adnan
- Stephen d'Silva
- Frederick Furtado
- Taherali Hassanali
- Anoop Mukundan
- Patrick Toto
- Julias Peter
- Jas Jabbal

Preliminary round

Team	Pld	W	D	L	GF	GA	Pts
Spain	5	4	1	0	33	3	9
India	5	3	2	0	39	6	8
Soviet Union	5	3	0	2	30	11	6
Poland	5	2	1	2	19	15	5
Cuba	5	1	0	4	7	42	2
Tanzania	5	0	0	5	3	54	0

20 July

India	18 – 0	Tanzania

21 July

Tanzania	0 – 12	Spain

23 July

Tanzania	0 – 4	Cuba

24 July

Soviet Union	11 – 2	Tanzania

26 July

Tanzania	1 – 9	Poland

Fifth place match

26 July

Cuba	4 – 1	Tanzania
