= Tanzania at the 2012 Summer Olympics =

- IOC code: TAN
- NOC: Tanzania Olympic Committee

in London
- Competitors: 6 in 3 sports
- Flag bearer: Zakia Mrisho Mohamed
- Medals: Gold 0 Silver 0 Bronze 0 Total 0

Summer Olympics appearances (overview)
- 1964; 1968; 1972; 1976; 1980; 1984; 1988; 1992; 1996; 2000; 2004; 2008; 2012; 2016; 2020; 2024; 2028

Tanzania competed at the 2012 Summer Olympics in London, United Kingdom from 27 July to 12 August, 2012. This was the nation's twelfth appearance at the Olympics. Tanzania did not compete at the 1976 Summer Olympics in Montreal, because of the African boycott.

The Tanzanian Olympic Committee sent the nation's smallest delegation to the Games since 2000. A total of six athletes, four men and two women, competed in athletics, boxing, and swimming. Half of the team previously competed in Beijing, including marathon runner Zakia Mrisho Mohamed, who was the nation's flag bearer at the opening ceremony.

Tanzania did not win any medals, continuing a medal-less streak that has lasted since the 1980 Summer Olympics in Moscow, where steeplechase runner Filbert Bayi, and long-distance runner Suleiman Nyambui won silver for each of their respective sporting events.

== Athletics ==
Tanzanian athletes have so far achieved qualifying standards in the following athletics events (up to a maximum of 3 athletes in each event at the 'A' Standard, and 1 at the 'B' Standard):

Key

- Note – Ranks given for track events are within the athlete's heat only
- Q = Qualified for the next round
- q = Qualified for the next round as a fastest loser or, in field events, by position without achieving the qualifying target
- NR = National record
- N/A = Round not applicable for the event
- Bye = Athlete not required to compete in round

Men

| Athlete | Event | Final | |
| Athlete | Event | Result | Rank |
|---|---|---|---|
| Faustine Mussa | Marathon | 2:17:39 | 33 |
| Samson Ramadhani | Marathon | 2:24:53 | 66 |

Women

| Athlete | Event | Heat | | Final | |
| Athlete | Event | Result | Rank | Result | Rank |
|---|---|---|---|---|---|
| Zakia Mrisho Mohamed | 5000 m | 15:39.58 | 16 | Did not advance | |

== Boxing ==
Tanzania has so far qualified boxers for the following events

Men

| Athlete | Event | Round of 32 | Round of 16 | Quarterfinals | Semifinals | Final | |
| Athlete | Event | Opposition Result | Opposition Result | Opposition Result | Opposition Result | Opposition Result | Rank |
|---|---|---|---|---|---|---|---|
| Selemani Salum Kidunda | Welterweight | Belous (MDA); L 7–20 | Did not advance | | | | |

== Swimming ==
Men

| Athlete | Event | Heat | | Semifinal | | Final | |
| Athlete | Event | Time | Rank | Time | Rank | Time | Rank |
|---|---|---|---|---|---|---|---|
| Ammaar Ghadiyali | 100 m freestyle | 1:01.07 | 55 | Did not advance | | | |

Women

| Athlete | Event | Heat | | Semifinal | | Final | |
| Athlete | Event | Time | Rank | Time | Rank | Time | Rank |
|---|---|---|---|---|---|---|---|
| Magdalena Moshi | 100 m freestyle | 1:05.80 | 45 | Did not advance | | | |
