= Tanzania at the 2024 Summer Olympics =

- IOC code: TAN
- NOC: Tanzania Olympic Committee

in Paris, France 26 July 2024 – 11 August 2024
- Competitors: 7 (4 men and 3 women) in 3 sports
- Flag bearers (opening): Andrew Thomas Mlugu & Sophia Latiff
- Flag bearers (closing): Alphonce Simbu & Jackline Sakilu
- Medals: Gold 0 Silver 0 Bronze 0 Total 0

Summer Olympics appearances (overview)
- 1964; 1968; 1972; 1976; 1980; 1984; 1988; 1992; 1996; 2000; 2004; 2008; 2012; 2016; 2020; 2024

Tanzania competed at the 2024 Summer Olympics in Paris from 26 July to 11 August 2024. Since the nation's official debut in 1964 under the name Tanganyika, Tanzanian athletes have appeared in every edition of the Summer Olympic Games, except for Montreal 1976 as part of the Congolese-led boycott.

== Competitors ==
The following is the list of number of competitors in the Games.

Sport	Men	Women	Total
Athletics	2	2	4
Judo	1	0	1
Swimming	1	1	2
Total	4	3	7

== Athletics ==
Tanzanian track and field athletes achieved the entry standards for Paris 2024, either by passing the direct qualifying mark (or time for track and road races) or by world ranking, in the following events (a maximum of 3 athletes each):

Key

- Note–Ranks given for track events are within the athlete's heat only
- Q = Qualified for the next round
- q = Qualified for the next round as a fastest loser or, in field events, by position without achieving the qualifying target
- NR = National record
- N/A = Round not applicable for the event
- Bye = Athlete not required to compete in round

Track and road events

Athlete	Event	Final	
Athlete	Event	Result	Rank
Gabriel Geay	Men's marathon	DNF	
Alphonce Simbu	Men's marathon	2:10:03	17
Jackline Sakilu	Women's marathon	DNF	
Magdalena Shauri	Women's marathon	2:31:58 SB	40

== Judo ==
For the first time since 2016, Tanzania qualified one judoka for the following weight class at the Games. Andrew Thomas Mlugu (men's 73 kg) qualified for the games through the allocations of universality places.

Athlete	Event	Round of 32	Round of 16	Quarterfinals	Semifinals	Repechage	Final / BM	
Athlete	Event	Opposition Result	Opposition Result	Opposition Result	Opposition Result	Opposition Result	Opposition Result	Rank
Andrew Thomas Mlugu	Men's –73 kg	Tin (SAM); W 10–01	Gaba (FRA); L 00–10	Did not advance				

== Swimming ==
For the first time since 2016, Tanzania sent two swimmers to compete at the 2024 Paris Olympics.

Athlete	Event	Heat		Semifinal		Final	
Athlete	Event	Time	Rank	Time	Rank	Time	Rank
Collins Saliboko	Men's 100 m freestyle	53.38	71	Did not advance			
Sophia Latiff	Women's 50 m freestyle	28.42	49	Did not advance			
