= Tanzania at the 1972 Summer Olympics =

- IOC code: TAN
- NOC: Tanzania Olympic Committee

in Munich
- Competitors: 15 (15 men) in 2 sports
- Flag bearer: Claver Kamanya
- Medals: Gold 0 Silver 0 Bronze 0 Total 0

Summer Olympics appearances (overview)
- 1964; 1968; 1972; 1976; 1980; 1984; 1988; 1992; 1996; 2000; 2004; 2008; 2012; 2016; 2020; 2024

Tanzania competed at the 1972 Summer Olympics in Munich, West Germany.

== Athletics ==
Men
Track & road events

Athlete	Event	Heat		Quarterfinal		Semifinal		Final	
Athlete	Event	Result	Rank	Result	Rank	Result	Rank	Result	Rank
Filbert Bayi	1500 m	3:45.4	6	did not advance					
Filbert Bayi	3000 m steeplechase	8:41.4	8	did not advance					
Norman Chihota	100 m	10.79	5	did not advance					
Claver Kamanya	400 m	46.18	3 Q	46.55	4	did not advance			
Hamad Ndee	200 m	21.74	7	did not advance					
Julius Wakachu	Marathon	—						DNF	
Obedi Mwanga; Norman Chihota; Claver Kamanya; Hamad Ndee	4 × 100 m relay	41.07	6	did not advance					
Hamad Ndee; Obedi Mwanga; Omari Abdallah; Claver Kamanya	4 × 400 m relay	3:10.1	6	did not advance					

== Boxing ==
Men

Athlete	Event	1 Round	2 Round	3 Round	Quarterfinals	Semifinals	Final	
Athlete	Event	Opposition Result	Opposition Result	Opposition Result	Opposition Result	Opposition Result	Opposition Result	Rank
Bakari Seleman	Light Flyweight	Kim U-Gil (PRK); L TKO-1	did not advance					
Saidi Tambwe	Flyweight	BYE	You Man-Chong (KOR); L 0-5	did not advance				
Flevitus Bitegeko	Bantamweight	Marin Lazar (ROU); L 0-5	did not advance					
Habibu Kinyogoli	Featherweight	Sun Soth (CAM); W 5-0	Antonio Rubio (ESP); L 0-5	did not advance				
Robert Mwakosya	Light Welterweight	Zvonimir Vujin (YUG); L TKO-2	did not advance					
Mbaraka Mkanga	Welterweight	BYE	Vartex Parsanian (IRI); L 0-5	did not advance				
Titus Simba	Middleweight	Reima Virtanen (FIN); L 2-3	did not advance					
Samson Laizer	Light Heavyweight	Guglielmo Spinello (ITA); L KO-2	did not advance					
