= Tanzania at the 2004 Summer Olympics =

- IOC code: TAN
- NOC: Tanzania Olympic Committee

in Athens
- Competitors: 8 in 1 sport
- Flag bearer: Restituta Joseph
- Medals: Gold 0 Silver 0 Bronze 0 Total 0

Summer Olympics appearances (overview)
- 1964; 1968; 1972; 1976; 1980; 1984; 1988; 1992; 1996; 2000; 2004; 2008; 2012; 2016; 2020; 2024

Tanzania was represented at the 2004 Summer Olympics in Athens, Greece by the Tanzania Olympic Committee.

In total, eight athletes including six men and two women represented Tanzania in one sport: athletics.

== Background ==
Tanganyika was represented at the 1964 Summer Olympics in Tokyo, Japan by what would become the Tanzania Olympic Committee. After the unification of Tanganyika and Zanzibar to form the United Republic of Tanzania, the country made its debut at the 1968 Summer Olympics in Mexico City, Mexico. They have appeared at every games since except the 1976 Summer Olympics in Montreal, Quebec, Canada after they took part in the African boycott. The 2004 Summer Olympics in Athens, Greece marked Tanzania's ninth appearance at the Summer Olympics. Prior to 2004, they had only won two medals – both silver – at the 1980 Summer Olympics in Moscow, Russian Soviet Federative Socialist Republic, Soviet Union.

== Competitors ==
In total, eight athletes represented Tanzania at the 2004 Summer Olympics in Athens, Greece in one sport.

Sport	Men	Women	Total
Athletics	6	2	8
Total	6	2	8

== Athletics ==
In total, eight Tanzanian athletes participated in the athletics events – Samwel Mwera in the 800 m and the 1,500 m, Fabiano Joseph Naasi in the men's 5,000 m and the men's 10,000 m, Restituta Joseph in the women's 5,000 m, John Yuda Msuri in the men's 10,000 m, Zebedayo Bayo, Samson Ramadhani and John Nada Saya in the men's marathon and Banuelia Mrashani in the women's marathon.

Most of the athletics events took place at the Athens Olympic Stadium in Marousi, Athens from 18 to 29 August 2004. The men's and women's marathons took place at the Panathenaic Stadium in Pangrati, Athens.

Men

Athlete	Event	Heat		Semifinal		Final	
Athlete	Event	Result	Rank	Result	Rank	Result	Rank
Zebedayo Bayo	Marathon	—				DNF	
Samwel Mwera	800 m	1:45.30 NR	3 q	DSQ		Did not advance	
Samwel Mwera	1,500 m	DNS		Did not advance			
John Yuda Msuri	10,000 m	—				DNF	
Fabiano Joseph Naasi	5,000 m	13:31.89	11	—		Did not advance	
Fabiano Joseph Naasi	10,000 m	—				28:01.94	10
Samson Ramadhani	Marathon	—				2:20:38	40
John Nada Saya	Marathon	—				DNF	

Women

Athlete	Event	Heat		Final	
Athlete	Event	Result	Rank	Result	Rank
Restituta Joseph	5,000 m	15:45.11	14	Did not advance	
Banuelia Mrashani	Marathon	—		DNF	

== See also ==
- Tanzania at the 2004 Summer Paralympics
- Tanzania at the 2006 Commonwealth Games
