= Tanzania at the 1988 Summer Olympics =

- IOC code: TAN
- NOC: Tanzania Olympic Committee

in Seoul
- Competitors: 10 (10 men and 0 women) in 2 sports
- Flag bearer: Ikaji Salum
- Medals: Gold 0 Silver 0 Bronze 0 Total 0

Summer Olympics appearances (overview)
- 1964; 1968; 1972; 1976; 1980; 1984; 1988; 1992; 1996; 2000; 2004; 2008; 2012; 2016; 2020; 2024

Tanzania competed at the 1988 Summer Olympics in Seoul, South Korea.

== Competitors ==
The following is the list of number of competitors in the Games.

Sport	Men	Women	Total
Athletics	6	0	6
Boxing	4	–	4
Total	10	0	10

== Athletics ==
Men
Track & road events

Athlete	Event	Heat		Quarterfinal		Semifinal		Final	
Athlete	Event	Result	Rank	Result	Rank	Result	Rank	Result	Rank
Boay Akonay	10000 m	29:19.06	29	did not advance					
John Burra	Marathon	—						2:24:17	43
Juma Ikangaa	Marathon	—						2:13:06	7
Juma Mnyampanda	5000 m	14:05.09	15	did not advance					
Ikaji Salum	3000 m steeplechase	9:10.36	9	did not advance					

Field events

Athlete	Event	Qualification		Final	
Athlete	Event	Distance	Position	Distance	Position
Zakayo Malekwa	Javelin throw	67.56	34	did not advance	

== Boxing ==
Men

Athlete	Event	1 Round	2 Round	3 Round	Quarterfinals	Semifinals	Final	
Athlete	Event	Opposition Result	Opposition Result	Opposition Result	Opposition Result	Opposition Result	Opposition Result	Rank
Benjamin Mwangata	Flyweight	BYE	Peter Ayesu (MAW); W 5-0	Alfred Kotey (GHA); L 0-5	did not advance			
Haji Ally	Bantamweight	Ibibongo Nduita (ZAI); L 2-3	did not advance					
Rashi Ali Hadj Matumla	Light Welterweight	Dieudonne Kouassi (CIV); W RSC-1	Vyacheslav Yanovski (URS); L RSC-3	did not advance				
Joseph Marwa	Welterweight	Kenneth Gould (USA); L 1-4	did not advance					

== See also ==
- Tanzania at the 1986 Commonwealth Games
- Tanzania at the 1990 Commonwealth Games
