= 25K run =

Long distance running footrace

Athletics 25K run

World records
- Men: Eliud Kipchoge 1:11:08 (2022)
- Women: Ruth Chepngetich 1:16:17 (2024)

The 25K run, 25 kilometres (16 mi), is a long distance running footrace that is between the distance of a half marathon and a marathon. It was formerly an official world record distance in road running by World Athletics, but has since been downgraded to world best status. Separately, the Association of Road Racing Statisticians retains world records in the 25K distance. The ARRS holds different standards for records than World Athletics, with exclusions for certain point-to-point races and mixed sex races. As a result its women's world record is 1:26:34 by Nancy Conz, set in 1982.

The distance was more common in the mid-20th century as mass road running was beginning to develop, but began declining with the increased popularity and familiarity of the marathon and half marathon distance. Some former 25K races have transitioned to shorter distances, with which runners and sponsors are more familiar. In particular, the establishment of the World Athletics Half Marathon Championships in 1992 proved a driver for private races and national championships to switch to the half marathon as the most common distance between the 10K run and the marathon.

However, as trail running and ultra running continue to find larger participant fields, the 25K has become a more common trail race distance (many trail races and ultra races use the metric system). As runners prepare for a 100K run, they may do training race steps with a 25K followed by a 50K.

== Competitions ==
In international competition, the distance has rarely been used. The World Masters Non-Stadia Athletics Championships hosted men's and women's 25K races from 1992 to 1996 and the European Masters Athletics Championships Non Stadia featured men's and women's 25K races in 1991. Official national championships have been staged by the United States beginning 1933 for men and 1982 for women. German-speaking European countries also held national championship races, including Austria, Switzerland, and Germany (both East, West and Unified). All of these were replaced by national half marathon championships, following the decision to host a world championship at that distance from 1992 onwards. Separately, Czechoslovakia also held several national 25K races in the mid-20th century.

Many of the longest running 25K races have taken place in the United States. The annual Around Cape Ann 25K in Gloucester, Massachusetts was established in 1933 as a 15-mile race (24.1 km) and has been held at the 25K distance from at least 1976. The River Bank Run, established 1978 in Grand Rapids, Michigan, is the most significant race in the nation at this distance and has hosted an official USATF national championship race every year since 1995. Other races include the Youngstown International Peace Race, which was held from 1975 to 1988, and the City of Lakes race (now a half marathon) which had a 25K race from 1982 to 2013.

Germany has also hosted multiple mass races at this distance. The BIG 25 Berlin, founded in 1980, is among the most significant privately-organised races over the distance, with the current men's world record being set at this competition in 2012. Elsewhere in Germany, the Griesheimer Straßenlauf was created in 1972 as an annual 25K, before converting to a half marathon in 1993. The Paderborner Osterlauf, also now a half marathon, was held over 25K from 1961 to 1992.

Elsewhere in Europe, in Helsinki, Finland the Kaisaniemen Juoksu 25K run was established in 1929 and was converted to a standard half marathon in 2012. The Brněnská 25 in the Czech Republic has been running since 1967, and the country's Beh Kolem Hluboke race has been held on over 75 occasions. In England, the Mitcham 25K was originally a 15-mile race, then converted to a 25K from 1968 to 2001, while the Chichester-Portsmouth course from 1932 to 1986 was roughly 25K. In Hungary the Pécs-Harkány 25K had been held annually since at least 2000.

The Stella Royal 25K has been held annually in Durban, South Africa since 1975.

In India, the AIMS-certified Tata Steel Kolkata 25K has been labeled a gold-labeled race by the IAAF. The race has been taking place since at least 2014, but has gain higher status in the late 2010s as greater prize purses were given and faster times were run. Nearly 15,000 runners participate in the event weekend, which includes the 25K and a 10K. The course records were set in 2023 by Daniel Ebenyo (1:11:13) and Sutume Kebede (1:18:47).

== All-time top 25 ==
- + = en route to longer performance
- Mx = mixed gender race
- Wo = women only race

=== Men ===
Rank	Time	Athlete	Nation	Date	Race	Location	Ref.
1	1:11:08+	Eliud Kipchoge	Kenya	25 September 2022	Berlin Marathon	Berlin	
2	1:11:12+	Jacob Kiplimo	Uganda	12 October 2025	Chicago Marathon	Chicago	
3	1:11:13	Daniel Ebenyo	Kenya	17 December 2023	Tata Steel Kolkata 25K	Kolkata	
4	1:11:18	Dennis Kipruto Kimetto	Kenya	6 May 2012	BIG 25 Berlin	Berlin	
5	1:11:22+	Amos Kipruto	Kenya	12 October 2025	Chicago Marathon	Chicago	
6	1:11:32+	Sabastian Sawe	Kenya	21 September 2025	Berlin Marathon	Berlin	
7	1:11:39+	Benson Kipruto	Kenya	3 March 2024	Tokyo Marathon	Tokyo	
7	1:11:39+	Timothy Kiplagat	Kenya	3 March 2024	Tokyo Marathon	Tokyo	
9	1:11:41+	Yomif Kejelcha	Ethiopia	26 April 2026	London Marathon	London	
10	1:11:42+	Vincent Kipkemoi	Kenya	3 March 2024	Tokyo Marathon	Tokyo	
10	1:11:42+	Tamirat Tola	Ethiopia	26 April 2026	London Marathon	London	
10	1:11:42+	Deresa Geleta	Ethiopia	26 April 2026	London Marathon	London	
13	1:11:47	Abraham Naibei Cheroben	Kenya	4 May 2014	BIG 25 Berlin	Berlin	
14	1:11:49	Joshua Cheptegei	Uganda	21 December 2025	Tata Steel Kolkata 25K	Kolkata	
15	1:11:50	Samuel Kiplimo Kosgei	Kenya	9 May 2010	BIG 25 Berlin	Berlin	
16	1:11:51+	Sisay Lemma	Ethiopia	3 December 2023	Valencia Marathon	Valencia	
16	1:11:51+	Chalu Deso	Ethiopia	3 December 2023	Valencia Marathon	Valencia	
18	1:11:52+	Dawit Wolde	Ethiopia	3 December 2023	Valencia Marathon	Valencia	
18	1:11:52+	Gabriel Geay	Tanzania	3 December 2023	Valencia Marathon	Valencia	
20	1:11:56+	Alexander Mutiso	Kenya	3 December 2023	Valencia Marathon	Valencia	
20	1:11:56+	Kibiwott Kandie	Kenya	3 December 2023	Valencia Marathon	Valencia	
20	1:11:56	Alphonce Simbu	Tanzania	21 December 2025	Tata Steel Kolkata 25K	Kolkata	
23	1:11:59	Tebello Ramakongoana	Lesotho	21 December 2025	Tata Steel Kolkata 25K	Kolkata	
24	1:12:04+	Kelvin Kiptum	Kenya	8 October 2023	Chicago Marathon	Chicago	
25	1:12:13	Mathew Kipkoech Kisorio	Kenya	8 May 2011	BIG 25 Berlin	Berlin	

==== Notes ====
Below is a list of other times equal or superior to 1:12:13:

- Sabastian Sawe also ran 1:11:41+ (2026).
- Amos Kipruto also ran 1:11:42+ (2026).
- Jacob Kiplimo also ran 1:11:42+ (2026).
- Eliud Kipchoge also ran 1:11:48+ (2023).

=== Women ===
Rank	Time	Athlete	Nation	Date	Race	Location	Ref.
1	1:16:17+ Mx	Ruth Chepngetich	Kenya	13 October 2024	Chicago Marathon	Chicago	
2	1:16:50+ Mx	Fotyen Tesfay	Ethiopia	15 March 2026	Barcelona Marathon	Barcelona	
3	1:17:07+ Mx	Sutume Kebede	Ethiopia	13 October 2024	Chicago Marathon	Chicago	
4	1:18:06+ Mx	Sifan Hassan	Netherlands	8 October 2023	Chicago Marathon	Chicago	
5	1:18:40+ Mx	Tigst Assefa	Ethiopia	24 September 2023	Berlin Marathon	Berlin	
6	1:18:48+ Wo	Hellen Obiri	Kenya	26 April 2026	London Marathon	London	
6	1:18:48+ Wo	Joyciline Jepkosgei	Kenya	26 April 2026	London Marathon	London	
8	1:18:58+ Mx	Peres Jepchirchir	Kenya	7 December 2025	Valencia	Valencia	
9	1:19:26	Yalemzerf Yehualaw	Ethiopia	17 December 2023	Tata Steel Kolkata 25K	Kolkata	
10	1:19:33+ Mx	Brigid Kosgei	Kenya	13 October 2019	Chicago Marathon	Chicago	
11	1:19:34+ Mx	Sheila Chepkirui	Kenya	24 September 2023	Berlin Marathon	Berlin	
12	1:19:36+ Mx	Zeineba Yimer	Ethiopia	24 September 2023	Berlin Marathon	Berlin	
12	1:19:36+ Mx	Dera Dida	Ethiopia	24 September 2023	Berlin Marathon	Berlin	
12	1:19:36+ Mx	Workenesh Edesa	Ethiopia	24 September 2023	Berlin Marathon	Berlin	
12	1:19:36	Degitu Azimeraw	Ethiopia	21 December 2025	Tata Steel Kolkata 25K	Kolkata	
16	1:19:37+ Mx	Amane Beriso Shankule	Ethiopia	4 December 2022	Valencia Marathon	Valencia	
16	1:19:37+ Mx	Letesenbet Gidey	Ethiopia	4 December 2022	Valencia Marathon	Valencia	
18	1:19:38+ Wo	Alemu Megertu	Ethiopia	21 April 2024	London Marathon	London	
18	1:19:38+ Wo	Tigist Ketema	Ethiopia	21 April 2024	London Marathon	London	
20	1:19:43+ Wo	Mary Jepkosgei Keitany	Kenya	23 April 2017	London Marathon	London	
21	1:19:47+ Mx	Senbere Teferi	Ethiopia	24 September 2023	Berlin Marathon	Berlin	
22	1:19:59+ Mx	Stella Chesang	Uganda	1 December 2024	Valencia Marathon	Valencia	
22	1:19:59+ Mx	Hawi Feysa	Ethiopia	12 October 2025	Chicago Marathon	Chicago	
22	1:19:59+ Mx	Magdalena Shauri	Tanzania	12 October 2025	Chicago Marathon	Chicago	
25	1:20:00+	Bertukan Welde	Ethiopia	1 March 2026	Tokyo Marathon	Tokyo	

==== Notes ====
Below is a list of other times equal or superior to 1:20:00:

- Ruth Chepngetich also run 1:18:03+ Mx (2022) and 1:18:06+ Mx (2023).
- Sutume Kebede also run 1:18:43+ (2025), 1:18:47 (2023) and 1:20:00+ Mx (2026).
- Tigst Assefa also run 1:18:48+ Wo (2026), 1:19:14+, 1:19:38+ Wo (2024).
- Joyciline Jepkosgei also run 1:18:58+ Mx (2025), 1:19:14+ Wo (2025), 1:19:38+ Wo (2024).
- Peres Jepchirchir also run 1:19:38+ Wo (2024).
- Yalemzerf Yehualaw also run 1:19:39+ Mx (2024).
- Sifan Hassan also run 1:19:40+ Wo (2025).
- Brigid Kosgei also run 1:19:47+ Wo (2024), 1:20:00+ Mx (2026).
