= Tanzania at the 1996 Summer Olympics =

- IOC code: TAN
- NOC: Tanzania Olympic Committee

in Atlanta
- Competitors: 7 (6 men and 1 woman) in 2 sports
- Flag bearer: Ikaji Salum
- Medals: Gold 0 Silver 0 Bronze 0 Total 0

Summer Olympics appearances (overview)
- 1964; 1968; 1972; 1976; 1980; 1984; 1988; 1992; 1996; 2000; 2004; 2008; 2012; 2016; 2020; 2024

Tanzania competed at the 1996 Summer Olympics in Atlanta, United States.

== Competitors ==
The following is the list of number of competitors in the Games.

Sport	Men	Women	Total
Athletics	4	1	5
Boxing	2	–	2
Total	6	1	7

== Athletics ==
Men
Track & road events

Athletes	Events	Heat Round 1		Heat Round 2		Semifinal		Final	
Athletes	Events	Time	Rank	Time	Rank	Time	Rank	Time	Rank
Marko Hhawu	10000 metres	28:14.08	10 q	—				28:20.58	12
Simon Qamunga	Marahon	—						2:33:11	92
Ikaji Salum	Marahon	—						2:25:29	69
Julius Sumaye	Marahon	—						Did not finish	

Women
Track and road events

Athletes	Events	Heat Round 1		Heat Round 2		Semifinal		Final	
Athletes	Events	Time	Rank	Time	Rank	Time	Rank	Time	Rank
Restituta Joseph	800 metres	2:08.31	30	Did not advance					

== Boxing ==
Men

Athlete	Event	Round of 32	Round of 16	Quarterfinal	Semifinal	Final
Athlete	Event	Opposition Result	Opposition Result	Opposition Result	Opposition Result	Opposition Result
Rashi Ali Hadj Matumla	Light-welterweight	Boudreault (CAN); L 16-12	Did not advance			
Hassan Mzonge	Welterweight	Karpačiauskas (LTU); L 9-1	Did not advance			

== See also ==
- Tanzania at the 1994 Commonwealth Games
- Tanzania at the 1998 Commonwealth Games
