= Tanzania at the 1968 Summer Olympics =

- IOC code: TAN
- NOC: Tanzania Olympic Committee

in Mexico City
- Competitors: 4 (4 men) in 2 sports
- Flag bearer: Norman Chihota
- Medals: Gold 0 Silver 0 Bronze 0 Total 0

Summer Olympics appearances (overview)
- 1964; 1968; 1972; 1976; 1980; 1984; 1988; 1992; 1996; 2000; 2004; 2008; 2012; 2016; 2020; 2024

Tanzania competed at the 1968 Summer Olympics in Mexico City, Mexico. Previously, the nation had competed as Tanganyika.

== Athletics ==
Men
Track and road events

Athlete	Event	Heat		Quarterfinal		Semifinal		Final	
Athlete	Event	Result	Rank	Result	Rank	Result	Rank	Result	Rank
John Stephen Akhwari	Marathon	—N/a						3:25:17	57
Norman Chihota	100 m	10.57	5	did not advance					
Norman Chihota	200 m	21:28	6	did not advance					
Claver Kamanya	400 m	45.74	2 Q	46.03	3 Q	46.22	7	did not advance	

== Boxing ==
Men

Athlete	Event	1 Round	2 Round	3 Round	Quarterfinals	Semifinals	Final	
Athlete	Event	Opposition Result	Opposition Result	Opposition Result	Opposition Result	Opposition Result	Opposition Result	Rank
Titus Simba	Middleweight	Chris Finnegan (GBR); L 0-5	did not advance					
