= Tanzania at the 2020 Summer Olympics =

- Flag of Tanzania
- IOC code: TAN
- NOC: Tanzania Olympic Committee

in Tokyo, Japan July 23, 2021 – August 8, 2021
- Competitors: 3 in 1 sport
- Flag bearer (opening): TOCOG volunteer
- Flag bearer (closing): Alphonce Felix Simbu
- Medals: Gold 0 Silver 0 Bronze 0 Total 0

Summer Olympics appearances (overview)
- 1964; 1968; 1972; 1976; 1980; 1984; 1988; 1992; 1996; 2000; 2004; 2008; 2012; 2016; 2020; 2024

Tanzania competed at the 2020 Summer Olympics in Tokyo. Originally scheduled to take place during the summer of 2020, the Games were postponed to 23 July to 8 August 2021, because of the COVID-19 pandemic. It was the nation's thirteenth consecutive appearance at the Summer Olympics.

== Competitors ==
The following is a list of the number of competitors in the Games.

Sport	Men	Women	Total
Athletics	2	1	3
Total	2	1	3

== Athletics ==
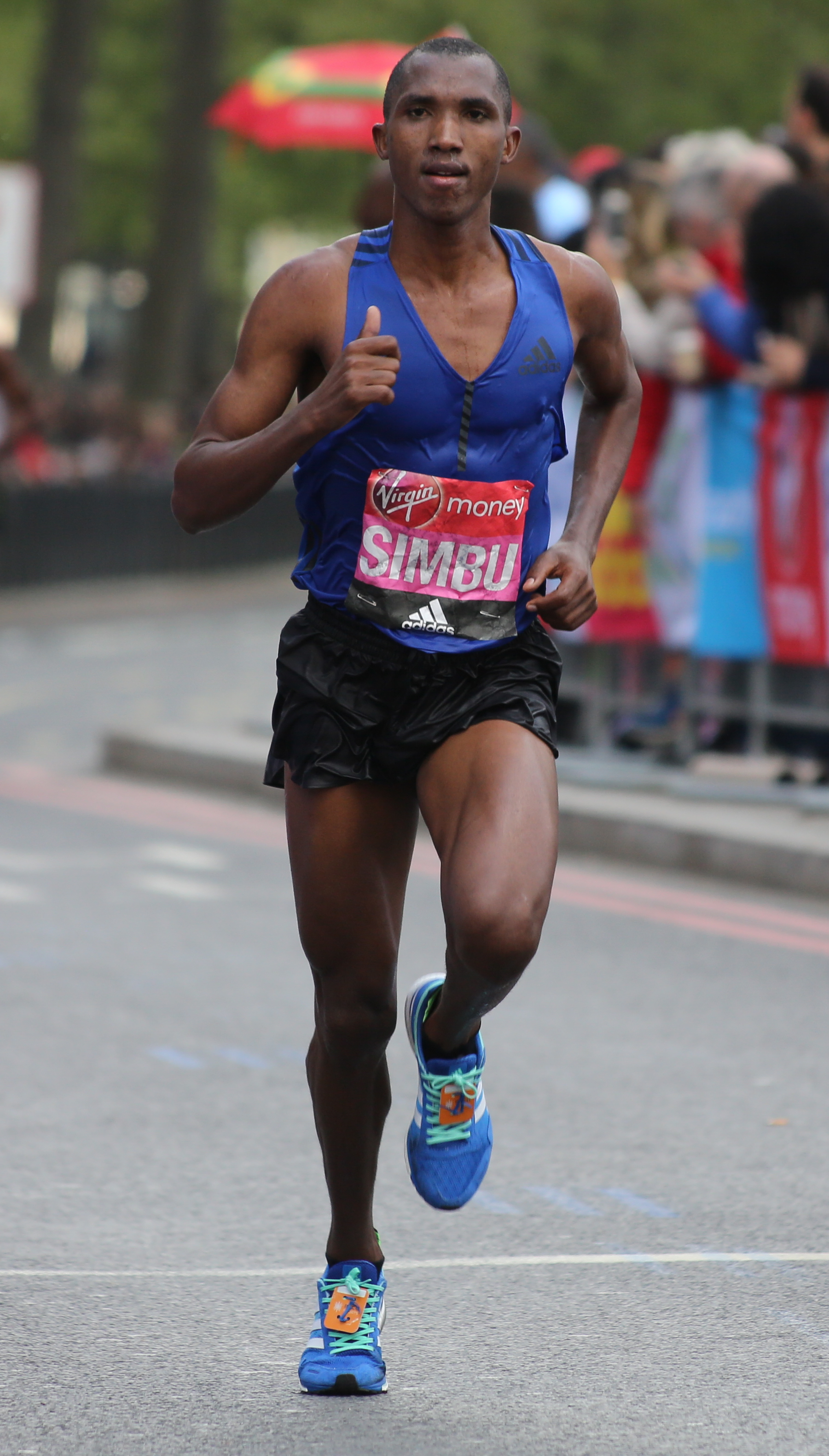
Alphonce Felix Simbu

Tanzanian athletes achieved the entry standards, either by qualifying time or by world ranking, in the following track and field events (up to a maximum of 3 athletes in each event):

Key

- Note–Ranks given for track events are within the athlete's heat only
- Q = Qualified for the next round
- q = Qualified for the next round as a fastest loser or, in field events, by position without achieving the qualifying target
- NR = National record
- N/A = Round not applicable for the event
- Bye = Athlete not required to compete in round

Track & road events

Athlete	Event	Final	
Athlete	Event	Result	Rank
Gabriel Gerald Geay	Men's marathon	DNF	
Alphonce Felix Simbu	Men's marathon	2:11:35	7
Failuna Matanga	Women's marathon	2:33:58	24
