= Tanzania at the 1984 Summer Olympics =

- IOC code: TAN
- NOC: Tanzania Olympic Committee

in Los Angeles
- Competitors: 18 (16 men and 2 women) in 2 sports
- Flag bearer: Michael Nassoro
- Medals: Gold 0 Silver 0 Bronze 0 Total 0

Summer Olympics appearances (overview)
- 1964; 1968; 1972; 1976; 1980; 1984; 1988; 1992; 1996; 2000; 2004; 2008; 2012; 2016; 2020; 2024

Tanzania competed at the 1984 Summer Olympics in Los Angeles.

== Athletics ==
Men
Track & road events

Athlete	Event	Heat		Quarterfinal		Semifinal		Final	
Athlete	Event	Result	Rank	Result	Rank	Result	Rank	Result	Rank
Zakariah Barie	5000 m	13:53.00	8 Q	—		13:43.49	7	did not advance	
Zakariah Barie	10000 m	28:15.18	3 Q	—				28:32.28	13
Juma Ikangaa	Marathon	—						2:11:10	6
James Igohe	1500 m	3:39.62	6 Q	3:41.57	10	did not advance			
Ibrahim Juma Kivina	10000 m	30:29.50	12	did not advance					
Agapius Masong Amo	Marathon	—						2:16:25	21
Zakaria Namonge	1500 m	3:45.55	6	did not advance					
Mohamed Rutitinga	5000 m	14:27.78	10	did not advance					
Gidamis Shahanga	10000 m	28:42.92	6	did not advance					
Gidamis Shahanga	Marathon	—						2:16:27	22
Alphonse Swai	5000 m	14:22.20	11	did not advance					

Field events

Athlete	Event	Qualification		Final	
Athlete	Event	Distance	Position	Distance	Position
Zakayo Malekwa	Javelin throw	75.18	19	did not advance	

Women
Track & road events

Athlete	Event	Heat		Quarterfinal		Semifinal		Final	
Athlete	Event	Result	Rank	Result	Rank	Result	Rank	Result	Rank
Nzaeli Kyomo	100 m	12.26	5 Q	12.53	8	did not advance			
Nzaeli Kyomo	200 m	24.68	25 q	25.11	8	did not advance			
Hwinga Mwanjala	3000 m	9.42.66	10	did not advance					

== Boxing ==
Men

Athlete	Event	1 Round	2 Round	3 Round	Quarterfinals	Semifinals	Final	
Athlete	Event	Opposition Result	Opposition Result	Opposition Result	Opposition Result	Opposition Result	Opposition Result	Rank
David Mwaba	Flyweight	—	Chibou Amna (ALG); W 5-0	Jeff Fenech (AUS); L 0-5	did not advance			
Rajabu Hussen	Featherweight	BYE	Edward Pollard (BAR); W 5-0	John Wanjau (KEN); L 1-4	did not advance			
Juma Bugingo	Light Welterweight	BYE	Kim Dong-Kil (KOR); L RSC-2	did not advance				
Neva Mkadala	Welterweight	BYE	Peter Okumu (NGR); L 2-3	did not advance				
Michael Nassoro	Light Heavyweight	—	Juha Hanninen (FIN); W RSC-1	Syivaus Okello (KEN); L 0-5	did not advance			
Willie Isangura	Super Heavyweight	—		BYE	Francesco Damiani (ITA); L RSC-2	did not advance		5
