= Tanzania at the Olympics =

- IOC code: TAN
- NOC: Tanzania Olympic Committee
- Medals Ranked 126th: Gold 0 Silver 2 Bronze 0 Total 2

Summer appearances
- 1964; 1968; 1972; 1976; 1980; 1984; 1988; 1992; 1996; 2000; 2004; 2008; 2012; 2016; 2020; 2024

Tanzania first participated at the Olympic Games in 1964, and has sent athletes to compete in every Summer Olympic Games since then, except for the boycotted 1976 Games. The nation has never participated in the Winter Olympic Games.

Tanzanian athletes have won a total of two medals, both in athletics.

The National Olympic Committee for Tanzania was created in 1968, and recognized by the International Olympic Committee that same year.

The résumé of Olympic events in which Tanzania has officially participated has been a static entity for most of the country's Olympic career, at least until recently. The country has in recent years begun to diversify the body of its participating athletes. Tanzania introduced itself to the Olympic swimming community at the 2008 Summer Olympics at Beijing, with its first team, which included the nation's first female athlete competing in a sport outside the country's familiar realm of athletics. Tanzania also included female swimming its team sent to the 2012 Summer Olympics in London. Despite the diversification of the nation's Olympic participation, the athlete body of the country's Olympic team nevertheless remains small.

== Medal tables ==
=== Medals by Summer Games ===
Games	Athletes	Gold	Silver	Bronze	Total	Rank
1964 Tokyo	4	0	0	0	0	–
1968 Mexico City	4	0	0	0	0	–
1972 Munich	15	0	0	0	0	–
1976 Montreal	boycotted					
1980 Moscow	41	0	2	0	2	28
1984 Los Angeles	18	0	0	0	0	–
1988 Seoul	10	0	0	0	0	–
1992 Barcelona	9	0	0	0	0	–
1996 Atlanta	7	0	0	0	0	–
2000 Sydney	4	0	0	0	0	–
2004 Athens	8	0	0	0	0	–
2008 Beijing	10	0	0	0	0	–
2012 London	6	0	0	0	0	–
2016 Rio de Janeiro	7	0	0	0	0	–
2020 Tokyo	3	0	0	0	0	–
2024 Paris	7	0	0	0	0	–
2028 Los Angeles	future event					
2032 Brisbane	future event					
Total		0	2	0	2	126

=== Medals by sport ===
Sport	Gold	Silver	Bronze	Total
Athletics	0	2	0	2
Totals (1 entries)	0	2	0	2

== List of medalists ==
Medal	Name	Games	Sport	Event
Silver	Suleiman Nyambui	1980 Moscow	Athletics	Men's 5000 metres
Silver	Filbert Bayi	1980 Moscow	Athletics	Men's 3000 metre steeplechase

== See also ==
- List of flag bearers for Tanzania at the Olympics
