= Mohamed Ikoki Msandeki =

Tanzanian marathon runner

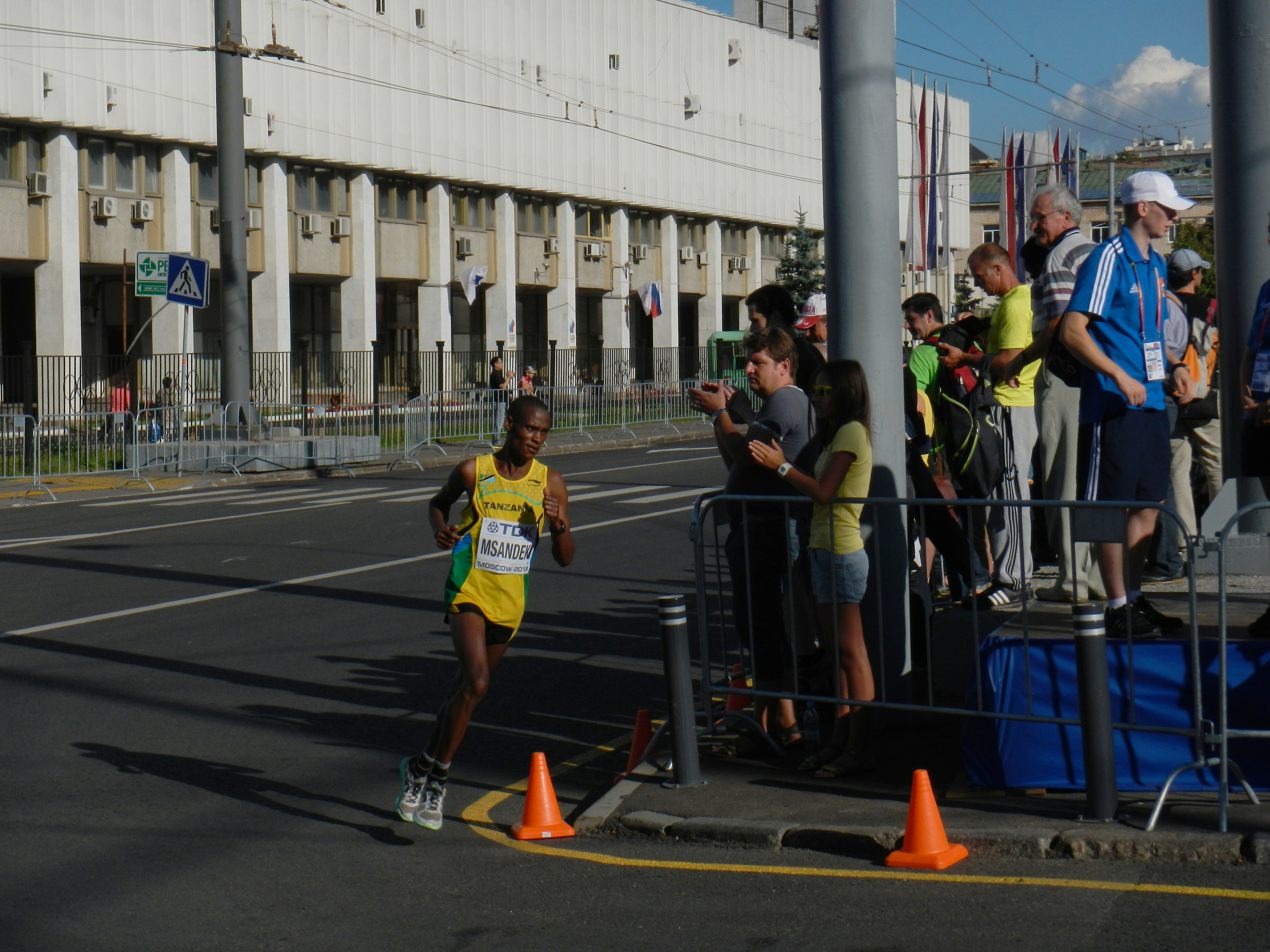

Personal information
- Nationality: Tanzania
- Born: 31 December 1985 (age 40) Kondoa, Tanzania
- Height: 1.80 m (5 ft 11 in)
- Weight: 68 kg (150 lb)

Sport
- Sport: Athletics
- Event: Marathon

Achievements and titles
- Personal best: Marathon: 2:11:01 (2010)

Mohamed Ikoki Msandeki (also spelled Msanduki, born December 31, 1985, in Kondoa) is a Tanzanian marathon runner. In 2008, he won the Luxembourg Marathon in a time of 2:15:29. He set his personal best time of 2:11:01, at the 2010 Gutenberg Marathon in Mainz, Germany Msandeki represented Tanzania at the 2012 Summer Olympics in London, where he competed for the men's marathon, along with his compatriots Samson Ramadhani and Faustine Mussa. However, he withdrew from the games on the day before the marathon event, because of illness.
