= Tanzania at the 1992 Summer Olympics =

- IOC code: TAN
- NOC: Tanzania Olympic Committee

in Barcelona
- Competitors: 9 (9 men and 0 women) in 2 sports
- Medals: Gold 0 Silver 0 Bronze 0 Total 0

Summer Olympics appearances (overview)
- 1964; 1968; 1972; 1976; 1980; 1984; 1988; 1992; 1996; 2000; 2004; 2008; 2012; 2016; 2020; 2024

Tanzania competed at the 1992 Summer Olympics in Barcelona, Spain.

== Competitors ==
The following is the list of number of competitors in the Games.

Sport	Men	Women	Total
Athletics	4	0	4
Boxing	5	–	5
Total	9	0	9

== Athletics ==
Men
Track & road events

Athlete	Event	Heat		Quarterfinal		Semifinal		Final	
Athlete	Event	Result	Rank	Result	Rank	Result	Rank	Result	Rank
John Burra	Marathon	—						DNF	
Juma Ikangaa	Marathon	—						2:19.34	34
Simon Robert Naali	Marathon	—						DNF	
Andrew Sambu	5000 m	13:36.99	4 Q	—				13:37.20	10

== Boxing ==
Men

Athlete	Event	1 Round	2 Round	Quarterfinals	Semifinals	Final	
Athlete	Event	Opposition Result	Opposition Result	Opposition Result	Opposition Result	Opposition Result	Rank
Benjamin Mwangata	Flyweight	Narciso González (MEX); W RSC-3	Luis Claudio Freitas (BRA); W 8-7	Timothy Austin (USA); L 8-19	did not advance		5
Rashi Ali Hadj Matumla	Lightweight	Felix Bwalya (ZAM); W 16-8	Jacobo Garcia (ISV); W 12-2	Namjilyn Bayarsaikhan (MGL); L 6-9	did not advance		5
Joseph Marwa	Light-Middleweight	BYE	Igors Šaplavskis (LAT); L 8-14	did not advance			
Makoye Isangula	Middleweight	Siamak Varzideh (IRN); W RSC-1	Albert Papilaya (INA); L 6-13	did not advance			
Paulo Mwaselle	Light-Heavyweight	Zoltán Béres (HUN); L 13-30	did not advance				

== Sources ==
- Official Olympic Reports
- sports-reference

== See also ==
- Tanzania at the 1990 Commonwealth Games
- Tanzania at the 1994 Commonwealth Games
