= Tanzania at the 2000 Summer Olympics =

- IOC code: TAN
- NOC: Tanzania Olympic Committee

in Sydney
- Competitors: 4 (3 men and 1 woman) in 1 sport
- Flag bearer: Restituta Joseph
- Medals: Gold 0 Silver 0 Bronze 0 Total 0

Summer Olympics appearances (overview)
- 1964; 1968; 1972; 1976; 1980; 1984; 1988; 1992; 1996; 2000; 2004; 2008; 2012; 2016; 2020; 2024

Tanzania competed at the 2000 Summer Olympics in Sydney, Australia.

== Competitors ==
The following is the list of number of competitors in the Games.

| Sport | Men | Women | Total |
|---|---|---|---|
| Athletics | 3 | 1 | 4 |
| Total | 3 | 1 | 4 |

== Athletics ==
Men
Track & road events

| Athlete | Event | Heat | | Quarterfinal | | Semifinal | | Final | |
| Athlete | Event | Time | Rank | Time | Rank | Time | Rank | Time | Rank |
|---|---|---|---|---|---|---|---|---|---|
| Zebedayo Bayo | Marathon | —N/a | | | | | | 2:26:24 | 61 |
| Angelo Peter Simon | Marathon | —N/a | | | | | | did not finish | |
| Fokasi Wilbrod | Marathon | —N/a | | | | | | did not finish | |

Women
Track and road events

| Athlete | Event | Heat | | Quarterfinal | | Semifinal | | Final | |
| Athlete | Event | Time | Rank | Time | Rank | Time | Rank | Time | Rank |
|---|---|---|---|---|---|---|---|---|---|
| Restituta Joseph | 5000 m | DNS | | did not advance | | | | | |
| Restituta Joseph | 10000 m | 33:12.18 | 21 | did not advance | | | | | |

== See also ==
- Tanzania at the 1998 Commonwealth Games
- Tanzania at the 2002 Commonwealth Games

== Sources ==
- Wallechinsky, David (2004). The Complete Book of the Summer Olympics (Athens 2004 Edition). Toronto, Canada. ISBN 1-894963-32-6.
- International Olympic Committee (2001). The Results Archived 18 September 2002 at the Australian Web Archive. Retrieved 12 November 2005.
- Sydney Organising Committee for the Olympic Games (2001). Official Report of the XXVII Olympiad Volume 1: Preparing for the Games Archived 9 November 2000 at the Wayback Machine. Retrieved 20 November 2005.
- Sydney Organising Committee for the Olympic Games (2001). Official Report of the XXVII Olympiad Volume 2: Celebrating the Games Archived 31 July 2012 at the Wayback Machine. Retrieved 20 November 2005.
- Sydney Organising Committee for the Olympic Games (2001). The Results Archived 27 September 2007 at the Wayback Machine. Retrieved 20 November 2005.
- International Olympic Committee Web Site
- sports-reference
