= Tanganyika at the 1964 Summer Olympics =

Tanzania at the 1964 Summer Olympics
- IOC code: TAN
- NOC: Tanzania Olympic Committee

in Tokyo
- Competitors: 4 (4 men) in 1 sport
- Medals: Gold 0 Silver 0 Bronze 0 Total 0

Summer Olympics appearances (overview)
- 1964; 1968; 1972; 1976; 1980; 1984; 1988; 1992; 1996; 2000; 2004; 2008; 2012; 2016; 2020; 2024

The United Republic of Tanganyika and Zanzibar, competing under the name of Tanganyika, competed in the Olympic Games for the first time at the 1964 Summer Olympics in Tokyo, Japan.

== Athletics ==
Men
Track & road events

Athlete	Event	Heat		Quarterfinal		Semifinal		Final	
Athlete	Event	Result	Rank	Result	Rank	Result	Rank	Result	Rank
Omari Abdallah	Marathon	—N/a						2:40:06.0	47
Mohamed Hassan Chabbanga	800 m	1:54.9	8	did not advance					
Pascal Mfyomi	10000 m	—N/a						DNF	
Daniel Thomas	400 m	50.4	8	did not advance					
