= Samwel Shauri =

Tanzanian long-distance runner

Personal information
- Nationality: Tanzania
- Born: Samwel Kwaangu Shauri; 30 December 1985 (age 40)

Sport
- Sport: Athletics
- Event: Long-distance running

Achievements and titles
- Personal bests: 5000 m: 13:39.25; 10,000 m: 27:49.35

Samwel Kwaangu Shauri (born December 30, 1985) is a Tanzanian long-distance runner. Shauri represented Tanzania at the 2008 Summer Olympics in Beijing, where he competed for the men's 10,000 metres, along with his compatriots Dickson Marwa and Fabiano Joseph Naasi. He finished the race in twenty-first place by nearly eight seconds behind Qatar's Essa Ismail Rashed, with a time of 28:06.26.
