= Athletics at the 2006 Commonwealth Games – Men's 10,000 metres =

Men's 10,000 metres at the Commonwealth Games

The men's 10,000 metres event at the 2006 Commonwealth Games was held on March 25.

== Results ==
Rank	Name	Nationality	Time	Notes
1st place, gold medalist(s)	Boniface Toroitich Kiprop	Uganda	27:50.99	
2nd place, silver medalist(s)	Geoffrey Kipngeno	Kenya	27:51.16	
3rd place, bronze medalist(s)	Fabian Joseph Naasi	Tanzania	27:51.99	SB
4	Paul Langat	Kenya	27:52.36	
5	Wilson Busienei	Uganda	28:37.38	
6	Dickson Marwa Mkami	Tanzania	28:47.49	
7	Michael Aish	New Zealand	29:05.55	
8	Gavin Thompson	England	29:41.77	
	Nyangero Lusato	Tanzania	DNF	
	Joseph Ebuya	Kenya	DNS	
