= Athletics at the 2008 Summer Olympics – Men's 10,000 metres =

Men's 10,000 metres at the Games of the XXIX Olympiad
- Venue: Beijing National Stadium
- Dates: August 17
- Competitors: 39 from 21 nations
- Winning time: 27:01.17 OR

Medalists
1st place, gold medalist(s)		Kenenisa Bekele	Ethiopia
2nd place, silver medalist(s)		Sileshi Sihine	Ethiopia
3rd place, bronze medalist(s)		Micah Kogo	Kenya

Official Video Highlights

The Men's 10,000 metres at the 2008 Summer Olympics took place on August 17 at the Beijing National Stadium. The winning margin was 1.60 seconds.

The race was dominated by the Ethiopian and Kenyan teams along with Tadese of Eritrea. With 200m remaining, Bekele pulled away from the rest of the field with a final lap of 53.42 seconds, winning his second 10,000m Olympic gold medal.

== Competition format ==
The qualifying standards for the 2008 event were 27:50.00 (A standard) and 28:10.00 (B standard).

The Men's 10,000m competition consisted of only one race the Final.

== Records ==
Prior to this competition, the existing world record, Olympic record, and world leading time were as follows:

World record	(Ethiopia) Kenenisa Bekele (ETH)	26:17.53	Brussels, Belgium	26 August 2005
Olympic record	Kenenisa Bekele (ETH)	27:05.10	Athens, Greece	20 August 2004
World Leading	Kenenisa Bekele (ETH)	26:25.97	Eugene, Oregon, United States	8 June 2008

The following new Olympic record was set during this competition:

Date	Event	Athlete	Time	Notes
17 August 2008	Final	Kenenisa Bekele (ETH)	27:01.17	OR

== Results ==
Rank	Athlete	Country	Time	Notes
1st place, gold medalist(s)	Kenenisa Bekele	Ethiopia	27:01.17	OR
2nd place, silver medalist(s)	Sileshi Sihine	Ethiopia	27:02.77	
3rd place, bronze medalist(s)	Micah Kogo	Kenya	27:04.11	SB
4	Moses Ndiema Masai	Kenya	27:04.11	SB
5	Zersenay Tadese	Eritrea	27:05.11	
6	Haile Gebrselassie	Ethiopia	27:06.68	
7	Martin Irungu Mathathi	Kenya	27:08.25	PB
8	Ahmad Hassan Abdullah	Qatar	27:23.75	SB
9	Fabiano Joseph Naasi	Tanzania	27:25.33	
10	Boniface Kiprop Toroitich	Uganda	27:27.28	
11	Selim Bayrak	Turkey	27:29.33	NR
12	Kidane Tadesse	Eritrea	27:36.11	
13	Galen Rupp	United States	27:36.99	SB
14	Dickson Marwa	Tanzania	27:48.03	
15	Abdihakim Abdirahman	United States	27:52.53	
16	Abdellah Falil	Morocco	27:53.14	
17	Juan Carlos de la Ossa	Spain	27:54.20	
18	Hasan Mahboob	Bahrain	27:55.14	
19	Dieudonné Disi	Rwanda	27:56.74	
20	Essa Ismail Rashed	Qatar	27:58.67	
21	Samwel Shauri	Tanzania	28:06.26	
22	Felix Kikwai Kibore	Qatar	28:11.92	
23	Carles Castillejo	Spain	28:13.68	
24	Ayad Lamdassem	Spain	28:13.73	
25	Jorge Torres	United States	28:13.93	
26	Surendra Kumar Singh	India	28:13.97	
27	Günther Weidlinger	Austria	28:14.38	
28	Kensuke Takezawa	Japan	28:23.28	
29	Juan Carlos Romero	Mexico	28:26.57	
30	Sergey Ivanov	Russia	28:34.72	
31	Takayuki Matsumiya	Japan	28:39.77	
32	Teklemariam Medhin	Eritrea	28:54.33	
33	Eric Gillis	Canada	29:08.10	
34	Rui Pedro Silva	Portugal	29:09.03	
35	Alejandro Suárez	Mexico	29:24.78	
	Cuthbert Nyasango	Zimbabwe	DNF	
	David Galván	Mexico	DNF	
	Mohamed El Hachimi	Morocco	DNF	
	Khoudir Aggoune	Algeria	DNS	

OR - Olympic Record, NR - National Record, PB - Personal Best, SB - Season Best

=== Splits ===
Intermediate	Athlete	Country	Mark
1000m	Alejandro Suárez	Mexico	2:50.15
2000m	Kidane Tadese	Eritrea	5:27.32
3000m	Kidane Tadese	Eritrea	8:09.93
4000m	Kidane Tadese	Eritrea	10:59.51
5000m	Kidane Tadese	Eritrea	13:48.00
6000m	Haile Gebrselassie	Ethiopia	16:33.92
7000m	Zersenay Tadese	Eritrea	19:14.71
8000m	Zersenay Tadese	Eritrea	21:53.78
9000m	Micah Kogo	Kenya	24:34.07
