= Tanzania at the 1994 Commonwealth Games =

Sporting event delegation

Flag of Tanzania

United Republic of Tanzania at the 1994 Commonwealth Games was abbreviated TAN. It won one bronze medal at the games.

== Medals ==
	Gold	Silver	Bronze	Total
United Republic of Tanzania	0	0	1	1

=== Gold ===
- none

=== Silver ===
- none

=== Bronze ===
- Matumla Hassan — Boxing, Men's Featherweight

== See also ==
- Tanzania at the 1992 Summer Olympics
- Tanzania at the 1996 Summer Olympics
