= 2025 Chicago Marathon =

26.2 mi (42.195 km) race in Illinois, U.S.

47th Chicago Marathon
- Location: Chicago, Illinois, U.S.
- Dates: October 12, 2025 (6 months ago)
- Website: chicagomarathon.com

Champions
- Men: Jacob Kiplimo (2:02:23)
- Women: Hawi Feysa (2:14:57)
- Wheelchair men: Marcel Hug (1:23:20)
- Wheelchair women: Susannah Scaroni (1:38:14)

The 2025 Chicago Marathon is the 47th edition of the annual Chicago Marathon. The race is the sixth of seven World Major Marathon events and is a platinum label race.

Notably, the 47th Chicago Marathon marks the first running of the race after the recently announced reduction in automatic qualification time standards. Despite the reductions, a record 160,000 people applied to run in the marathon, with an estimated 53,000 runners expected to cross the finish line. This number likely will break the event record of 52,150 from the 2024 Chicago Marathon.

== Background ==
External image
- 2025 Chicago Marathon Course Map

The Chicago Marathon is regarded as one of the fastest marathon courses due to its unparalleled flat course and usual cool weather conditions. These ideal conditions have made Chicago the site of seven world records at the marathon distance, with the most recent coming in the 2024 edition, where Ruth Chepng'etich lowered the record to 2:09:56, besting the prior record by nearly 2 minutes on her way to becoming the first women under the 2:10:00 mark.

== Competitors ==
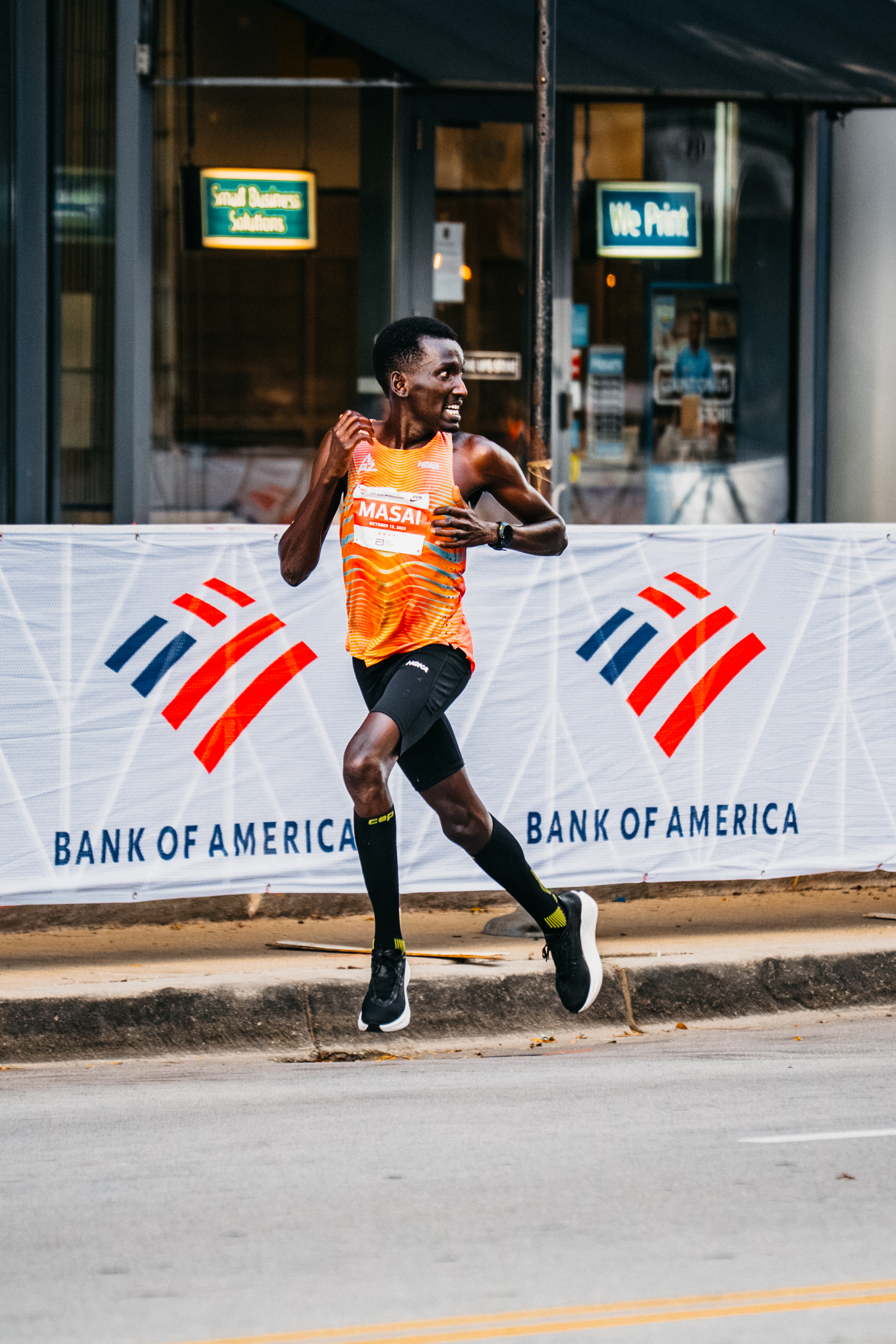
3rd place finisher, Alex Masai, at mile 25 of the 2025 Chicago Marathon

The mens elite race boasts one of the most talented fields in the World Marathon Major events this year. Kenyan John Korir, the defending champion, headlined the mens field with a 2:02:44 PB set during his victory at the 2024 Chicago Marathon. Korir was joined by compatriots Timothy Kiplagat, Amos Kipruto, and Cybrian Kotut all with personal bests under the 2:04:00 mark. The two time Olympic marathon medalist Bashir Abdi from Belgium with a 2:03:36 also toed the line. Half marathon world record holder Jacob Kiplimo from Uganda entered with a 2:03:37 from his debut performance at the 2025 London Marathon where he placed second. American Conner Mantz ran 2:05:08 on his way to a 4th place finish at the 2025 Boston Marathon, however because the Boston Marathon does not qualify for ratification of official records, Mantz will attempted to lower the US (2:05:38) and North American (2:05:36) records in Chicago.

Because 2024 champion and WR holder Ruth Chepng'etich is not entered to run the 2025 edition, she did not defend her title. Ethiopian Megertu Alemu lead the field with a 2:16:34 PB and three World Marathon Major podium finishes, most recently, a third place finish at the 2023 Chicago Marathon. Ethiopian Hawi Feysa entered the race with a 2:17:00 and a podium finish at the 2025 Tokyo Marathon. Compatriots Bedatu Hirpa, and Haven Hailu Desse started the race with personal bests under 2:20 across the distance. Ejgayehu Taye, the 2023 World bronze medalist across 10,000m will made her debut at the marathon distance.

== Results ==
The Chicago Marathon began on October 12 at 7:20am.

=== Men ===
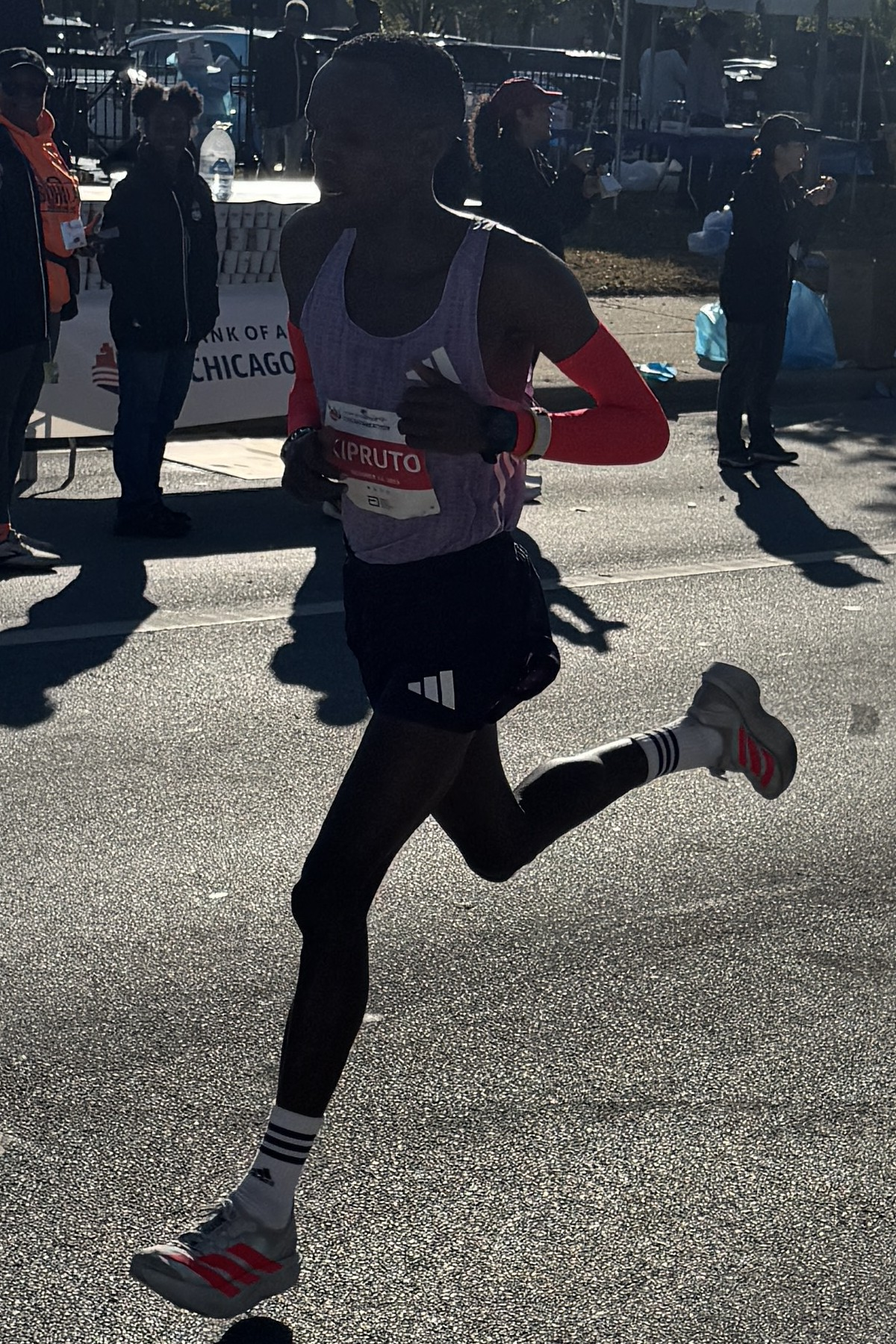
Amos Kipruto during the 2025 Chicago Marathon.

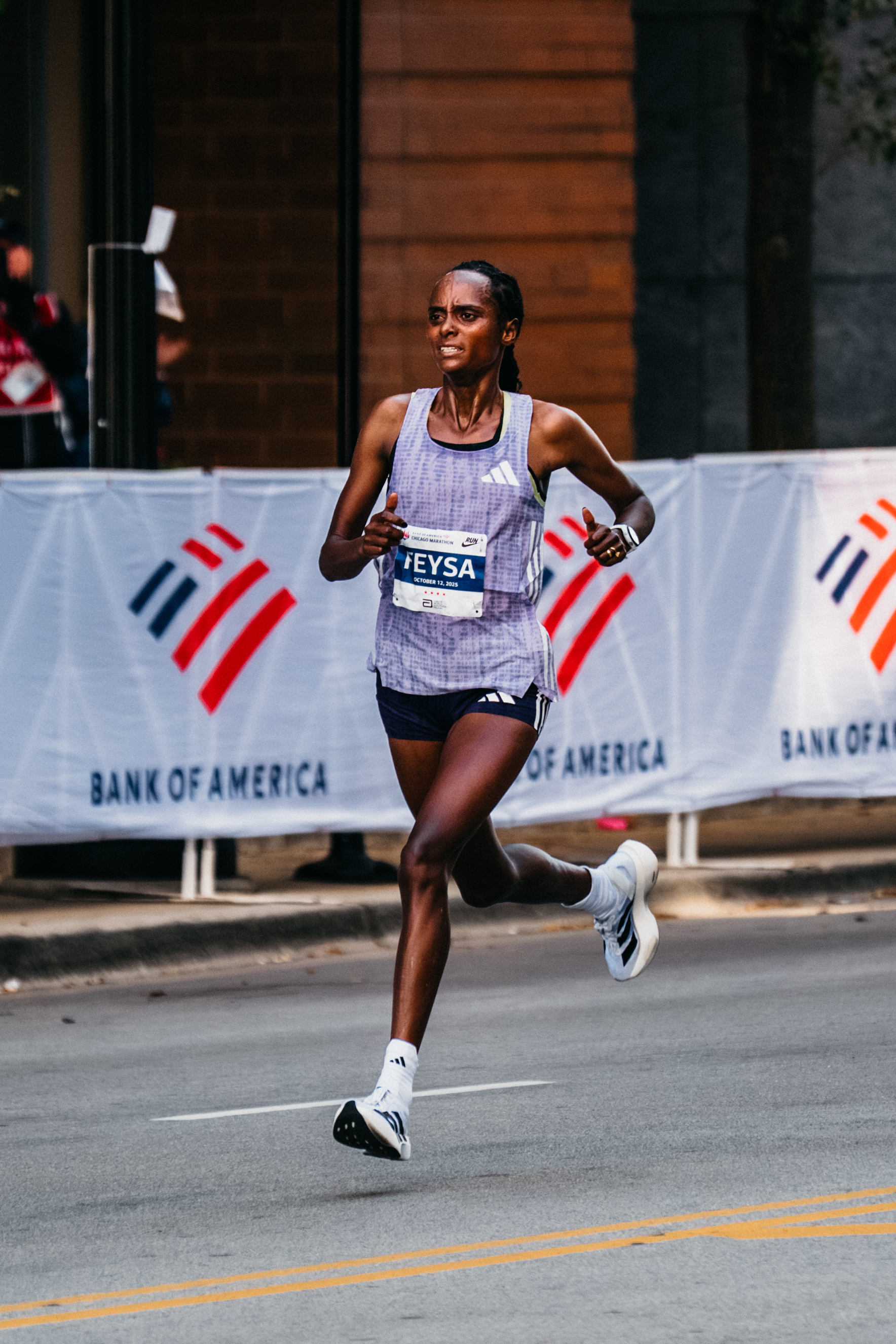
Hawi Feysa a mile before her win at the 2025 Chicago Marathon

Elite men's top 10 finishers
Position	Athlete	Nationality	Time
1st place, gold medalist(s)	Jacob Kiplimo	Uganda	2:02:23 NR
2nd place, silver medalist(s)	Amos Kipruto	Kenya	2:03:54
3rd place, bronze medalist(s)	Alex Masai	Kenya	2:04:37
4	Conner Mantz	United States	2:04:43 AR
5	Mohamed Esa	Ethiopia	2:04:50
6	Seifu Tura	Ethiopia	2:05:17
7	Geoffrey Kamworor	Kenya	2:05:31
8	Philemon Kiplimo Kimaiyo	Kenya	2:06:14
9	Rory Linkletter	Canada	2:06:49
10	Bashir Abdi	Belgium	2:07:08

=== Women ===
Elite women's top 10 finishers
Position	Athlete	Nationality	Time
1st place, gold medalist(s)	Hawi Feysa	Ethiopia	2:14:56
2nd place, silver medalist(s)	Megertu Alemu	Ethiopia	2:17:18
3rd place, bronze medalist(s)	Magdalena Shauri	Tanzania	2:18:03 NR
4	Loice Chemnung	Kenya	2:18:23
5	Mary Ngugi-Cooper	Kenya	2:19:25
6	Natosha Rogers	United States	2:23:28
7	Dakotah Popehn	United States	2:24:21
8	Florencia Borelli	Argentina	2:24:23
9	Gabriella Rooker	United States	2:26:32
10	Melody Julien	France	2:27:09
