= Saidi Makula =

Tanzanian long-distance runner

Personal information
- Born: 1 August 1994 (age 31)

Sport
- Sport: Track and field
- Event: Marathon

Saidi Juma Makula (born 1 August 1994) is a Tanzanian long-distance runner who specialises in the marathon. He competed in the men's marathon event at the 2016 Summer Olympics where he finished in 43rd place with a time of 2:17:49.
