= Faustine Mussa =

Tanzanian long-distance runner

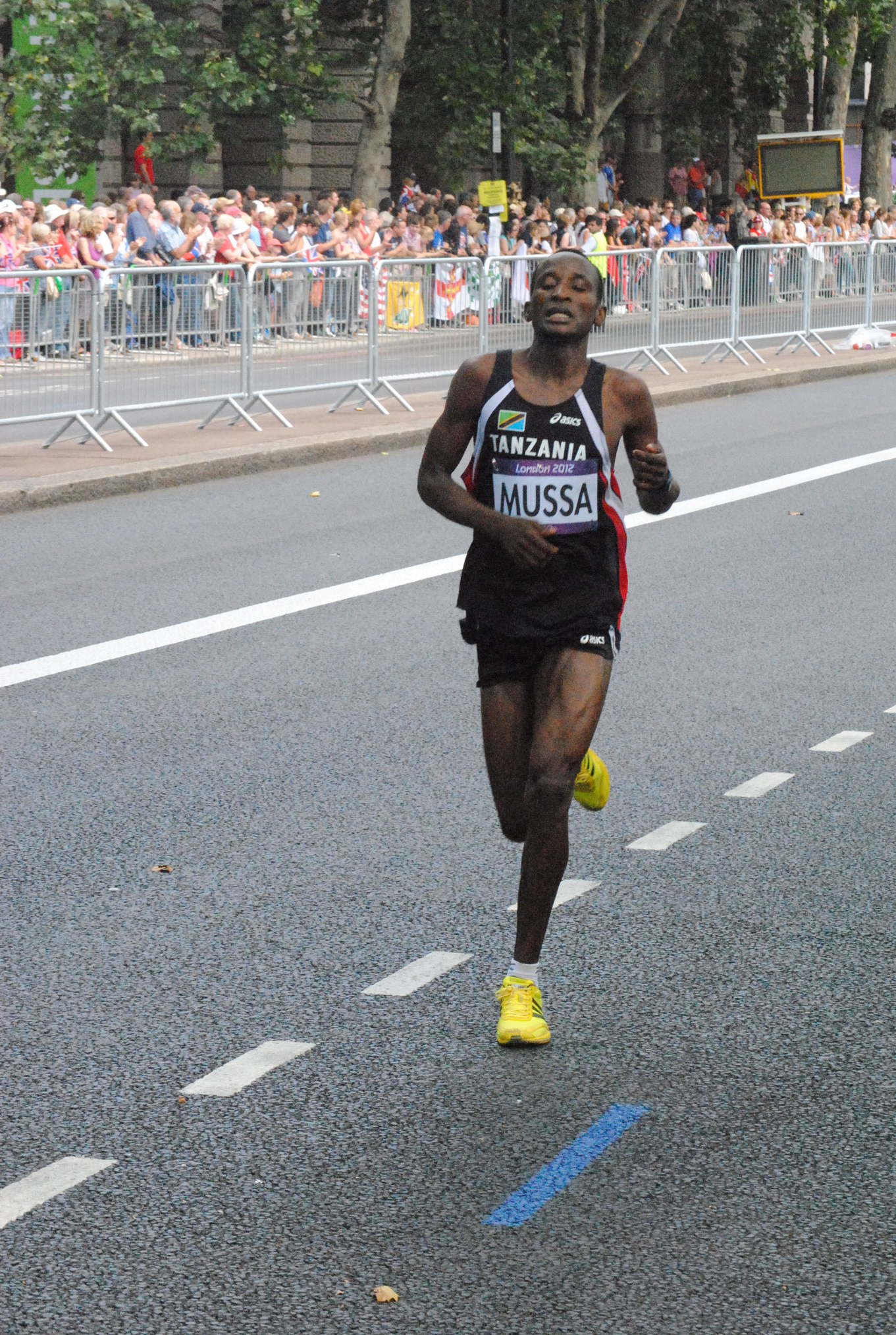
- Mussa in the marathon at the 2012 Olympics in London

Personal information
- Born: April 2, 1981 (age 44)
- Height: 1.75 m (5 ft 9 in)
- Weight: 60 kg (130 lb)

Sport
- Country: Tanzania
- Sport: Athletics
- Event: Marathon

Faustine Mussa Baha (born 1981) is a Tanzanian long-distance runner. He represented Tanzania in marathon at the 2012 Summer Olympics in London, finishing in 33rd in a time of 2:17:39.
