= Restituta Joseph =

Tanzanian long-distance runner

Restituta Joseph Kemi (born 30 July 1971 in Singida) is a Tanzanian long-distance runner. She twice carried the flag for Tanzania at the opening ceremony of the Summer Olympics: in 2000 and 2004.

She was the 1997 and 1999 winner of the Corrida de Langueux race.

== International competitions ==
Year	Competition	Venue	Position	Event	Notes
Representing Tanzania
1998	World Cross Country Championships	Marrakesh, Morocco	5th	Short race	
1998	World Cross Country Championships	Marrakesh, Morocco	17th	Long race	
1999	World Cross Country Championships	Belfast, United Kingdom	5th	Short race	
1999	World Cross Country Championships	Belfast, United Kingdom	12th	Long race	
1999	World Championships	Seville, Spain	13th	10,000 m	
2000	World Cross Country Championships	Budapest, Hungary	22nd	Long race	
2000	World Cross Country Championships	Budapest, Hungary	10th	Team	
2001	World Cross Country Championships	Ostend, Belgium	24th	Short race	
2001	World Cross Country Championships	Ostend, Belgium	8th	Team	
2001	World Cross Country Championships	Ostend, Belgium	13th	Long race	
2001	World Cross Country Championships	Ostend, Belgium	9th	Team	
2001	World Half Marathon Championships	Bristol, United Kingdom	15th	Half marathon	
2002	Africa Military Games	Nairobi, Kenya	2nd	5000 m	

== Personal bests ==
- 800 metres - 2:08.31 min (1996)
- 1500 metres - 4:10.01 min (2001)
- 3000 metres - 8:44.28 min (2001)
- 5000 metres - 15:05.33 min (2001)
- 10,000 metres - 31:32.02 min (1999)
- Half marathon - 1:07:59 min (2000)
- Marathon - 2:43:52 min (2001)

Olympic Games
Preceded by Ikaji Salum	Flagbearer for Tanzania; Sydney 2000 & Athens 2004	Succeeded by Fabiano Joseph Naasi
