= Peter Mwita =

Tanzanian sprinter

Personal information
- Nationality: Tanzanian
- Born: 1948 (age 77–78) Inchugu, Pemba, Mara
- Died: 8 february 2021 Dar es salaam
- Height: 172 cm (5 ft 8 in)
- Weight: 116 kg (256 lb)

Sport
- Sport: Sprinting
- Event: 100 metres
- Club: jwtz club
Medal record
Men's athletics
Representing Tanzania
African Championships
Bronze medal – third place	1979 Dakar	4×100 m

Peter Mwita Mokam (born 1948) is a Tanzanian sprinter. He competed in the men's 100 metres at the 1980 Summer Olympics.
