= Mwalimu Ally =

Tanzanian sprinter (born 1953)

Personal information
- Nationality: Tanzanian
- Born: 8 May 1953 (age 73)

Sport
- Sport: Sprinting
- Event: 100 metres

Mwalimu Ally (born 8 May 1953) is a Tanzanian sprinter. He competed in the men's 100 metres at the 1980 Summer Olympics.
