= Dickson Marwa Mkami =

Tanzanian long-distance runner

Dickson Marwa Mkami (born 9 March 1982 in Tarime District, Mara Region) is a Tanzanian long-distance runner. He competes in both track and road running. He represented Tanzania at the 2006 Commonwealth Games and the 2008 Olympic Games. He is the Tanzanian record holder for the half marathon with his best of 59:52 minutes.

He finished sixteenth over 10,000 metres at the 2007 World Championships in Athletics and was also seventh at the 2007 IAAF World Road Running Championships that year. He was fourteenth on the track at the Beijing Olympics and finished sixteenth for a second time at the 2009 World Championships in Athletics.

He is a two-time winner of the Sydney City2Surf and the Bridge to Brisbane, having won both races in 2006 and 2007. He took part in the Ras Al Khaimah Half Marathon in 2008 and finished in third. Marwa won the Prague 10K in 2009 and was runner-up at the event the following year. He took fourth place at the Portugal Half Marathon in 2010, finishing with a time of 1:03:14. He finished in the top ten of his first race of 2011, the Ras Al Khaimah Half Marathon. He was sixth at the Marseille-Cassis Classic later that year.

== Achievements ==
Year	Competition	Venue	Position	Event	Notes
2006	Commonwealth Games	Melbourne, Australia	8th	5000 m	13:26.43 PB
2006	Commonwealth Games	Melbourne, Australia	6th	10,000 m	28:47.49 PB
2006	World Road Running Championships	Debrecen, Hungary	12th	20 km	58:19 PB
2007	World Cross Country Championships	Mombasa, Kenya	66th	Senior race	
2007	All-Africa Games	Algiers, Algeria	4th	10,000 m	27:59.91
2007	World Championships	Osaka, Japan	16th	10,000 m	29:25.91
2007	World Road Running Championships	Udine, Italy	8th	Half marathon	
2008	Olympic Games	Beijing, China	14th	10,000 m	27:48.03
2009	World Championships	Berlin, Germany	16th	10,000 m	28:18.00

=== Personal bests ===
- 1500 metres – 3:44.16 min (2005)
- 3000 metres – 7:43.01 min (2007)
- 5000 metres – 13:25.18 min (2007)
- 10,000 metres – 27:38.58 min (2007)
- 10 kilometres – 27:54 min (2007)
- Half marathon – 59:52 min (2008)
- Marathon – 2:12:53 hrs (2003)
