= John Burra =

Tanzanian long-distance runner (born 1965)

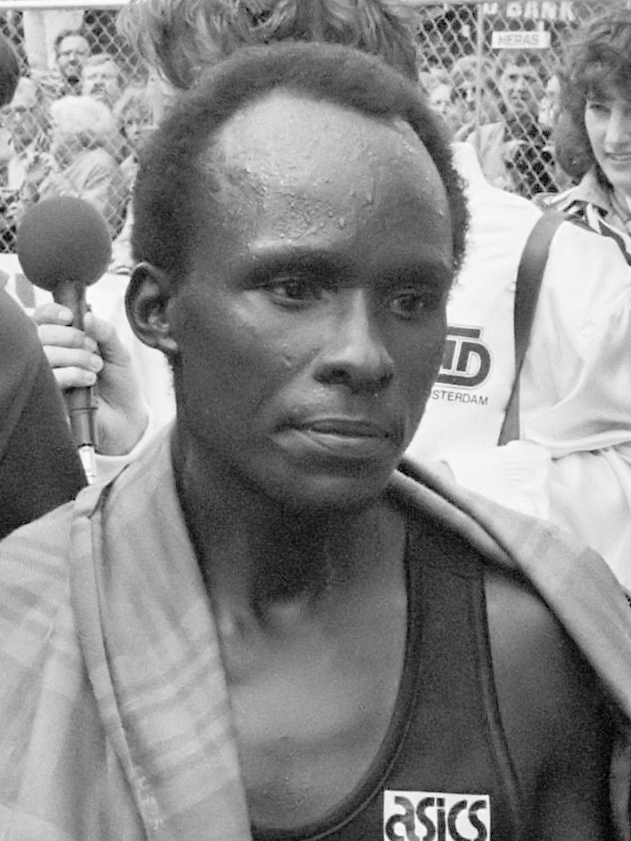
John Burra (1987)

John Burra (born November 20, 1965) is a retired long-distance runner from Tanzania, who won the 1987 edition of Amsterdam Marathon, clocking 2:12:40 on May 10, 1987. He twice represented his native country in the Olympic men's marathon, in 1988 and 1992. At his last Olympic Games appearance in Barcelona, Spain he didn't finish the race.

He won the City-Pier-City Loop half marathon in the Hague in 1991 and also won the Madrid Marathon.

== Achievements ==
Year	Competition	Venue	Position	Event	Notes
Representing Tanzania
1987	Amsterdam Marathon	Amsterdam, Netherlands	1st	Marathon	2:12:40
1988	Olympic Games	Seoul, South Korea	43rd	Marathon	2:24:17
1990	Amsterdam Marathon	Amsterdam, Netherlands	2nd	Marathon	2:12:42
1991	City-Pier-City Loop	The Hague, Netherlands	1st	Half Marathon	1:01:38
1991	Madrid Marathon	Madrid, Spain	1st	Marathon	2:12:19
1992	Olympic Games	Barcelona, Spain	—	Marathon	DNF
