= Hamad Ndee =

Tanzanian sprinter

Personal information
- Nationality: Tanzanian
- Born: 15 May 1951 (age 75)

Sport
- Sport: Sprinting
- Event: 200 metres

Hamad Ndee (born 15 May 1951) is a Tanzanian sprinter. He competed in the men's 200 metres at the 1972 Summer Olympics.
