= Claver Kamanya =

Tanzanian sprinter

Personal information
- Born: Claver Kamanya; 25 March 1947 (age 79) Bukoba, Kagera, Tanganyika
- Height: 1.75 m (5 ft 9 in)
- Weight: 65 kg (143 lb)

Sport
- Country: Tanzania
- Sport: Athletics
Medal record
Men's Athletics
British Commonwealth Games
Bronze medal – third place	1974 Christchurch	400 metres

Claver Kamanya (born 25 March 1947) is a Tanzanian former athlete who specialised in sprinting events. Born in Bukoba, he represented Tanzania at two Olympic Games and won a bronze medal in the 400 metres at the 1974 British Commonwealth Games.

At the 1968 Summer Olympics he competed in the 400 metres and set his personal best time, 45.74, in the opening heats of the competition, which remains a national record. He was eliminated in the semi-finals stage after placing seventh.

Kamanya was Tanzania's flag bearer at the 1972 Summer Olympics where in addition to the 400 metres he competed in relays events. A quarter-finalist in the individual 400 metres, he raced in the heats for Tanzania in the 4 x 100 and 4 x 400 relays.
