= Gabriel Geay =

Tanzanian long-distance runner (born 1996)

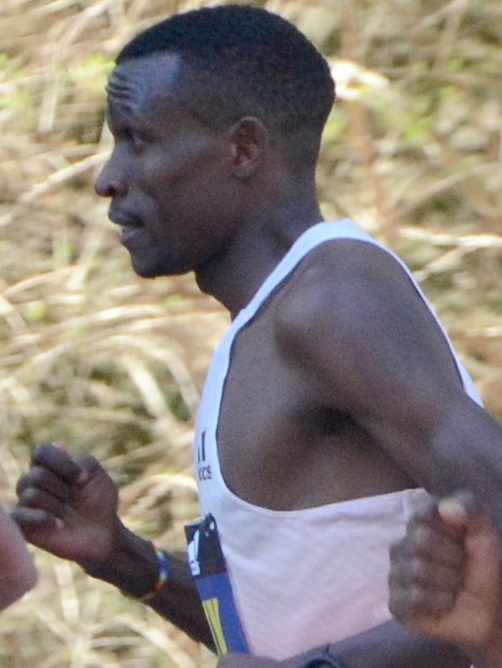
- Gabriel Geay nearing halfway point in 2022 Boston Marathon

Personal information
- Born: September 10, 1996 (age 30) Madunga, Babati, Manyara Region, Tanzania

Sport
- Country: Tanzania

Achievements and titles
- Personal bests: 5000 m: 13:20.35 (2017); 10,000 m: 28:04.98 (2016); Road; 10 km: 27:49 (2023); Half marathon: 59:18 NR (2025); Marathon: 2:03:00 (2022)
Medal record
Men's athletics
Representing Tanzania
World Marathon Majors
Silver medal – second place	2023 Boston	Marathon
Bronze medal – third place	2026 Berlin	Marathon

Gabriel Gerald Geay (born 10 September 1996) is a Tanzanian professional long-distance runner. He finished second at the 2023 Boston Marathon.

Geay is the Tanzanian national record holder for the marathon. He also has the fastest Marathon time for a person born outside of Kenya or Ethiopia.

== Career ==
Geay has won 7 notable road races including the Peachtree Road Race in 2016 and the Bolder Boulder 10K in 2017.

In 2017, he competed in the senior men's race at the 2017 IAAF World Cross Country Championships held in Kampala, Uganda, finishing 22nd.

As of July 2018, he earned over US$33,000 in prize money.

In 2019, he competed in the senior men's race at the World Cross Country Championships held in Aarhus, Denmark and finished in 88th place.

In 2021, he placed sixth in a new Tanzanian national record of 2:04:55 at the Milano City Marathon in Italy. This performance qualified him for the 2020 Tokyo Olympics. He competed at the Games with compatriot Alphonce Felix Simbu in the men's marathon in August 2021.

In 2022, he was second in the Valencia Marathon in Spain in a national record of 2:03:00.

== Statistics ==
=== International competitions ===
Year	Competition	Venue	Position	Event	Time
Representing Tanzania
2014	African Junior Championships	Addis Ababa, Ethiopia	4th	5000 m	14:59.87
2017	World Cross Country Championships	Kampala, Uganda	22nd	Senior race	29:47
2017	World Championships	London, United Kingdom	—	5000 m	DNS
2019	World Cross Country Championships	Aarhus, Denmark	87th	Senior race	35:16
2019	African Games	Rabat, Morocco	6th	1500 m	3:39.29
2021	Olympic Games	Tokyo, Japan	—	Marathon	DNF
2022	World Championships	Eugene, OR, United States	7th	Marathon	2:07:31
2024	Olympic Games	Paris, France	—	Marathon	DNF
World Marathon Majors
2022	Boston Marathon	Boston, MA, United States	4th	Marathon	2:07:53
2023	Boston Marathon	Boston, MA, United States	2nd	Marathon	2:06:04
2024	Boston Marathon	Boston, MA, United States	—	Marathon	DNF
2026	Berlin Marathon	Berlin, Germany	3rd	Marathon	2:03:59

=== National titles ===
- Tanzanian Athletics Championships
  - 800 metres: 2018
  - 1500 metres: 2018
  - 5000 metres: 2020
