= Omari Abdallah =

Tanzanian long-distance runner (born 1943)

Personal information
- Nationality: Tanzanian
- Born: 5 May 1943 (age 83)

Sport
- Sport: Long-distance running
- Event: Marathon

Omari Abdallah (born 5 May 1943) is a Tanzanian long-distance runner. He competed in the marathon at the 1964 Summer Olympics and in the 4 x 400 metres relay at the 1972 Summer Olympics.
