= Michael Nassoro =

Tanzanian boxer (born 1956)

Personal information
- Nationality: Tanzanian
- Born: 13 July 1956 (age 68)

Sport
- Sport: Boxing

Michael Nassoro (born 13 July 1956) is a Tanzanian boxer. He competed at the 1980 Summer Olympics and the 1984 Summer Olympics.
