= Magdalena Moshi =

Tanzanian swimmer (born 1990)

Personal information
- Full name: Magdalena Ruth Alex Moshi
- National team: Tanzania
- Born: 30 November 1990 (age 35)
- Height: 1.63 m (5 ft 4 in)
- Weight: 52 kg (115 lb)

Sport
- Sport: Swimming
- Strokes: Freestyle
- Coach: Jill Doyle

Magdalena Ruth Alex Moshi (born 30 November 1990) is a Tanzanian swimmer. At the 2012 Summer Olympics, she competed in the Women's 100 metre freestyle, finishing in 45th place overall in the heats, failing to qualify for the semifinals. She competed in the 2016 Summer Olympics in the 50m freestyle event, being ranked 67th of 91 competitors, with a time of 29.44s.

She competed at the 2014 Commonwealth Games, in the 50 and 100 m freestyle.

== Personal life ==
Moshi moved to Adelaide in South Australia in 2010 to study Health Sciences at the University of Adelaide and was studying to complete a PhD in Medicine at the same time as preparing for the 2016 Olympic Games. She hopes to return to Tanzania to work in physiology or public health.
