= Andrew Thomas Mlugu =

Tanzanian judoka (born 1995)

Personal information
- Born: 12 November 1995 (age 30) Dar es Salaam, Tanzania
- Occupation: Judoka

Sport
- Country: Tanzania
- Sport: Judo
- Weight class: ‍–‍73 kg

Achievements and titles
- Olympic Games: R16 (2024)
- World Champ.: R128 (2019)
- African Champ.: 7th (2023, 2024)
- Commonwealth Games: R16 (2014)

Profile at external databases
- IJF: 10561
- JudoInside.com: 86416
- Updated on 29 July 2024

Andrew Thomas Mlugu (born 12 November 1995) is a Tanzanian judoka. He competed at the 2016 Summer Olympics in the men's 73 kg event, in which he was eliminated in the second round by Jake Bensted. He was the flag bearer for Tanzania in the Parade of Nations.
