= Norman Chihota =

Tanzanian sprinter

Personal information
- Nationality: Tanzanian
- Born: 25 August 1947 (age 78) Dodoma
- Height: 1.75

Sport
- Sport: Sprinting
- Event: 100 metres

Norman Chihota (born 25 August 1947) is a Tanzanian sprinter. He competed in the 100 metres at the 1968 Summer Olympics and the 1972 Summer Olympics.
