= Magdalena Shauri =

Tanzanian athlete

Personal information
- Nationality: Tanzanian
- Born: 25 February 1996 (age 30)

Sport
- Sport: Long-distance running
- Event: Marathon
Medal record
World Marathon Majors
Bronze medal – third place	2023 Berlin	Marathon
Bronze medal – third place	2025 Chicago	Marathon

Magdalena Crispin Shauri (born 25 February 1996) is a Tanzanian long distance runner. She competed in the women's marathon at the 2017 World Championships in Athletics. In 2019, she competed in the senior women's race at the 2019 IAAF World Cross Country Championships. She finished in 49th place. In the 2024 Olympic Games marathon in Paris, she ran a time of 2:31:58, good for 40th place.

Shauri holds the Tanzanian record for the marathon (women) with a time of 2:18:41. She set that record at the 2023 Berlin Marathon where she finished in 3rd place (behind Tigst Assefa who broke the world record in 2:11:53). Shauri's P.R. for the half-marathon is 1:06:37, set in 2020.
