= Suleiman Nyambui =

Tanzanian long-distance runner

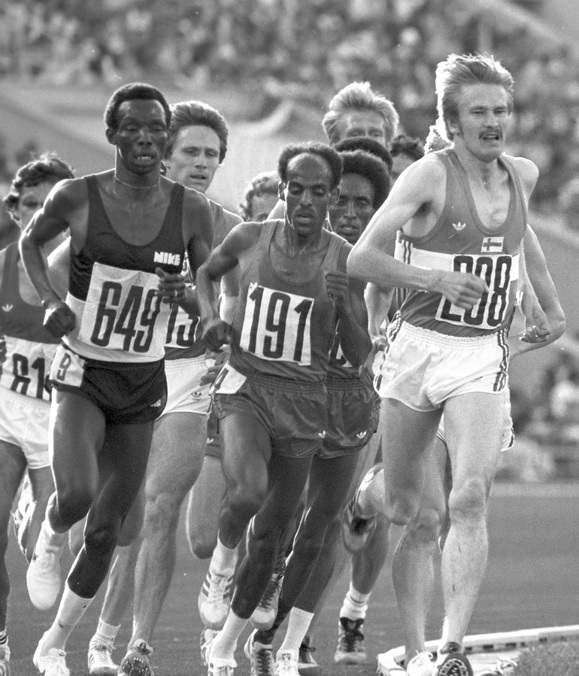
- Nyambui (#649; far left), Yifter (#191), and Maaninka (#208) at the 1980 Summer Olympics

Personal information
- Born: February 13, 1953 (age 73) Majita Musoma, Mara Region, Tanganyika Territory (now Tanzania)

Sport
- Sport: Track
- Events: 1500 metres, Mile, 2-mile, 5000 metres, 10,000 metres, Marathon
- College team: UTEP

Achievements and titles
- Personal bests: 1500 metres: 3:35.8; Mile: 3:51.94; Indoor 2-mile: 8:17.9; 5000 metres: 13:12.29; 10,000 metres: 27:51.73; Marathon: 2:09:52
Medal record
Representing Tanzania
Olympic Games
Silver medal – second place	1980 Moscow	5,000 metres
All-Africa Games
Bronze medal – third place	1978 Algiers	5,000 metres

Suleiman Nyambui (born February 13, 1953) is a former track athlete from Tanzania who specialized in various long-distance disciplines. Nyambui won the bronze medal at the 1978 All-Africa Games, the silver medal in 5000 metres at the 1980 Summer Olympics, and finished first at three consecutive marathons between 1987 and 1988. He holds multiple indoor national records of Tanzania in athletics.

== Running career ==
=== Early life ===
Nyambui had dropped out of school after primary education. He became a fisherman in Ukerewe District in Mwanza Region, where his potential as a good athlete was spotted by the Region's Athletic Organization. The organization helped in his training and afforded him facilities and guidance in making him a national and international athlete. He also had joined the Tanzania National Service before he went to train as a teacher. He taught school at Bukumbi (20 miles from Mwanza City) before moving to the United States to study for his bachelor's and master's degrees at the University of Texas at El Paso (UTEP). Then he took a contract to train Bahraini athletes along with Canadian coaches Craig Taylor and Greg Peters from 1996 to 1998. After that he moved back to Tanzania.

=== Collegiate ===
He attended UTEP from 1978 to 1982, where, as an older athlete (he was 29 when he graduated), he won four straight NCAA titles in the 10,000 meters, one of only five Division I men to ever accomplish such a feat, and the only Division I man to win four straight indoor 1 mile championships. He also won three straight NCAA titles in the 5,000 meters while at UTEP and was the 1980 NCAA Cross Country champion. In a memorable Millrose Games race in New York in February 1981, Nyambui broke the world indoor 5,000 meter record with a 13:20.4, just ahead of Alberto Salazar who broke the American indoor 5,000 meter record.

=== Post-collegiate ===
Nyambui would go on to represent Tanzania in the men's 5000 metre race at the 1980 Summer Olympics, where he finished second behind only Miruts Yifter. After running shorter-distance races, Nyambui would go on to run several marathons, winning the Berlin Marathon on two occasions and the Stockholm Marathon in 1988.

Sporting positions
Preceded by (Kenya) Henry Rono	Men's 5,000-m Best Year Performance; 1979	Succeeded by (Ethiopia) Miruts Yifter
