= Samson Ramadhani =

Tanzanian marathon runner

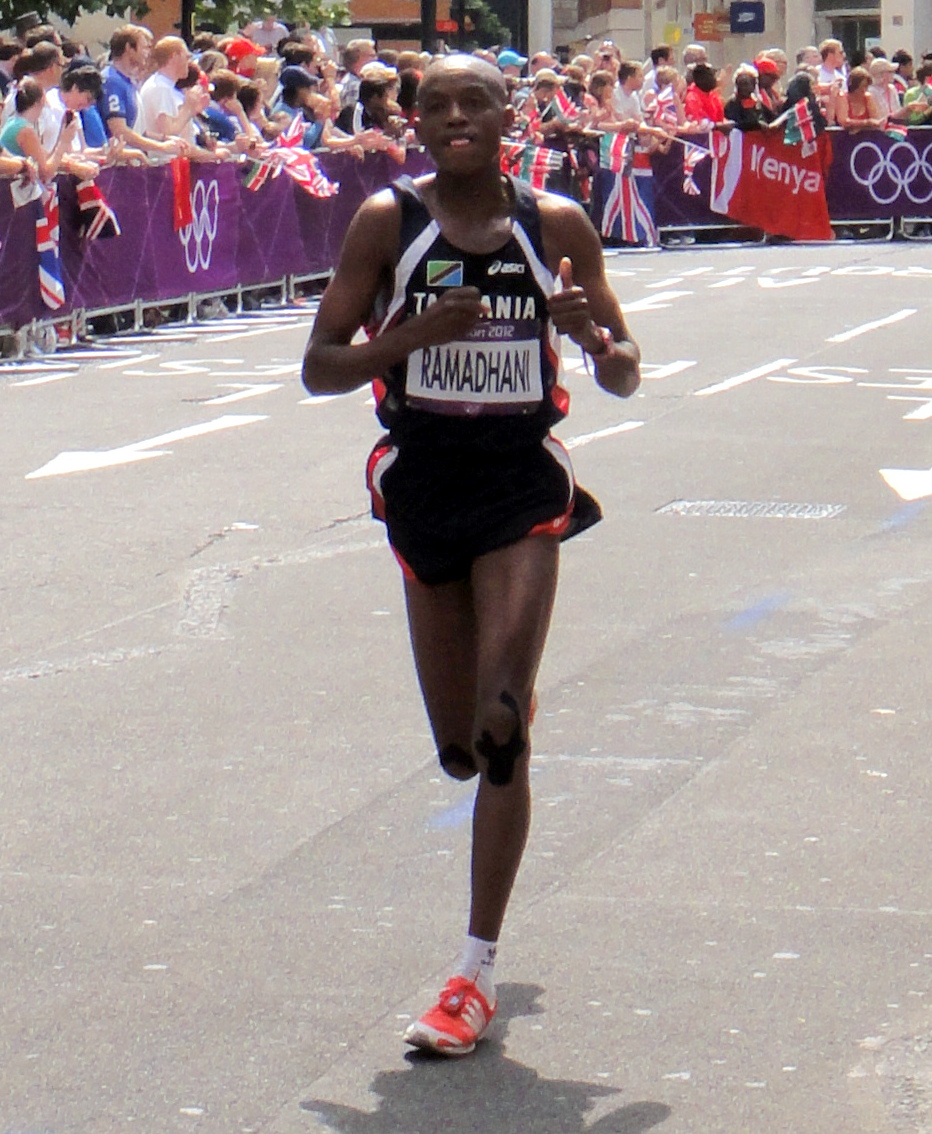
- Samson Ramadhani in the marathon at the 2012 Summer Olympics

Personal information
- Born: 25 December 1982 (age 43)
- Height: 1.7 m (5 ft 7 in)
- Weight: 51 kg (112 lb)

Sport
- Country: Tanzania
- Sport: Athletics
- Event: Marathon
- Coached by: Zacharia Gwandu
- Updated on 23 July 2012

Samson Ramadhani Nyonyi (born 25 December 1982 in Singida) is a Tanzanian marathon runner. He was the gold medalist at the 2006 Commonwealth Games that took place in Melbourne, Australia with the result at 2:11:29.

In 2003 he participated three marathons: He won the Beppu Oita Marathon, was fifth at the London Marathon (time 2:08:01, still his personal best) and was 15th at the World Championships in Paris.

He finished 40th at the 2004 Olympic Games, and 5th at the 2005 World Championships.

In 2007 he won the Lake Biwa Marathon and competed at the 2007 World Championships in Osaka finishing 25th. At the 2008 Olympic marathon he finished 55th, and 66th at the 2012 Men's marathon.

== Achievements ==
Year	Competition	Venue	Position	Event	Notes
Representing Tanzania
2000	World Junior Championships	Santiago, Chile	26th (h)	1500m	3:56.74
2003	Beppu-Ōita Marathon	Beppu-Ōita, Japan	1st	Marathon	2:09:24
2003	World Championships	Paris, France	15th	Marathon	2:11:21
2004	Olympic Games	Athens, Greece	40th	Marathon	2:20:38
2006	Commonwealth Games	Melbourne, Australia	1st	Marathon	2:11:29
2007	World Championships	Osaka, Japan	25th	Marathon	2:25:51
2007	Lake Biwa Marathon	Ōtsu, Japan	1st	Marathon	2:10:43
2008	Olympic Games	Beijing, PR China	55th	Marathon	2:25:03
2012	Olympic Games	London, United Kingdom	66th	Marathon	2:24:53
