= Zakayo Malekwa =

Tanzanian athletics competitor

Personal information
- Born: February 2, 1951 (age 75)

Sport
- Sport: Athletics
- Event: Javelin
Medal record
Men's athletics
Representing Tanzania
Commonwealth Games
Bronze medal – third place	1982 Brisbane	Javelin
African Championships in Athletics
Silver medal – second place	1979 Dakar	Javelin
Gold medal – first place	1982 Cairo	Javelin

Zakayo Malekwa (born February 2, 1951) is a retired track and field athlete from Tanzania, who competed in the men's javelin throw event during his career. He represented his native country at three consecutive Summer Olympics, starting in Moscow, Soviet Union (1980). There he set his best Olympic result by finishing in 16th place in the overall-rankings.

== International competitions ==
Year	Competition	Venue	Position	Notes
Representing Tanzania
1979	African Championships	Dakar, Senegal	2nd	76.06 m
1980	Olympic Games	Moscow, Soviet Union	16th	71.58 m
1982	Commonwealth Games	Brisbane, Australia	3rd	80.22 m
1982	African Championships	Cairo, Egypt	1st	76.18 m
1983	World Championships	Helsinki, Finland	17th	72.92 m
1984	Olympic Games	Los Angeles, United States	19th	75.18 m
1987	All-Africa Games	Nairobi, Kenya	2nd	72.32 m
1987	World Championships	Rome, Italy	30th	71.74 m
1988	Olympic Games	Seoul, South Korea	34th	67.56 m
