= Ikaji Salum =

Tanzanian long-distance runner

Ikaji Salum (born 15 February 1967) is a retired Tanzanian long-distance runner.

He participated in 3000 metres steeplechase at the 1988 Summer Olympics. In the marathon he finished sixteenth at the 1995 World Championships and participated at the 1996 Summer Olympics. His personal best time was set in April, 1995, when he finished with a time of 2:10.25 in the Rome Marathon, good enough for second place.

== Achievements ==
| Year | Competition | Venue | Position | Event | Notes |
Representing Tanzania
| 1995 | World Championships | Gothenburg, Sweden | 16th | Marathon | 2:18:39 |
| 1996 | Olympic Games | Atlanta, United States | 69th | Marathon | 2:25:29 |
