= Zakia Mrisho Mohamed =

Tanzanian long-distance runner

Personal information
- Born: February 19, 1984 (age 41)
- Height: 1.6 m (5 ft 3 in)
- Weight: 50 kg (110 lb)

Sport
- Country: Tanzania
- Sport: Athletics
- Event: 5,000 metres
- Coached by: Zacharia Gwandu
- Updated on 23 July 2012

Zakia Mrisho Mohamed (born February 19, 1984) is a Tanzanian long-distance runner who specialises in track and road running. She represented her country in the 5000 metres at the 2008 Olympic Games and 2012 Olympic Games.

Born in Singida, She attended her first major international athletics competition in 2003, taking part in the 3000 metres in which she finished sixth. She won the Cinque Mulini cross country meeting in 2004, becoming the first Tanzanian woman to do so. She was selected for the 2005 IAAF World Cross Country Championships and managed to finish in twentieth place in the long race. She came sixth in the 5000 m at the 2005 World Championships in Athletics and third at the World Athletics Final (3000 m) a month later. She represented Tanzania at the 2006 Commonwealth Games, finishing eighth in the 5000 m final.

At the 2007 IAAF World Cross Country Championships she was 23rd overall but she was less successful on the track, failing to make it out of the 5000 m heats of the 2007 World Championships in Athletics. The same fate awaited her at her first Olympic Games in Beijing the following year, although she did manage a fourth-place finish in the 3000 m at the 2008 IAAF World Athletics Final as well as competing in the 5000 m event. She reached her first major global final in the next season at the 2009 World Championships in Athletics, taking 15th place in the 5000 m.

Mrisho was selected as one of three representatives for Africa in the women's 5000 m at the 2010 IAAF Continental Cup (along with Vivian Cheruiyot and Sentayehu Ejigu and she finished in fifth place. She won the adidas Women's 5K in Prague in September 2010, beating runner-up and defending champion Gladys Otero by a margin of seventeen seconds.

== Achievements ==
Year	Competition	Venue	Position	Notes
2003	World Athletics Final	Monte Carlo, Monaco	6th	3000 metres
2005	World Championships	Helsinki, Finland	6th	5000 metres
2005	World Athletics Final	Monte Carlo, Monaco	3rd	3000 metres
2006	Commonwealth Games	Melbourne, Australia	8th	5000 m
2008	World Athletics Final	Stuttgart, Germany	4th	3000 m

=== Personal bests ===
- 1500 metres - 4:10.47 (2005)
- 3000 metres - 8:39.91 (2005)
- 5000 metres - 14:43.87 (2005)
- 10,000 metres - 32:20.47 (2010)
