= Alphonce Simbu =

Tanzanian long-distance runner

Alphonce Felix Simbu
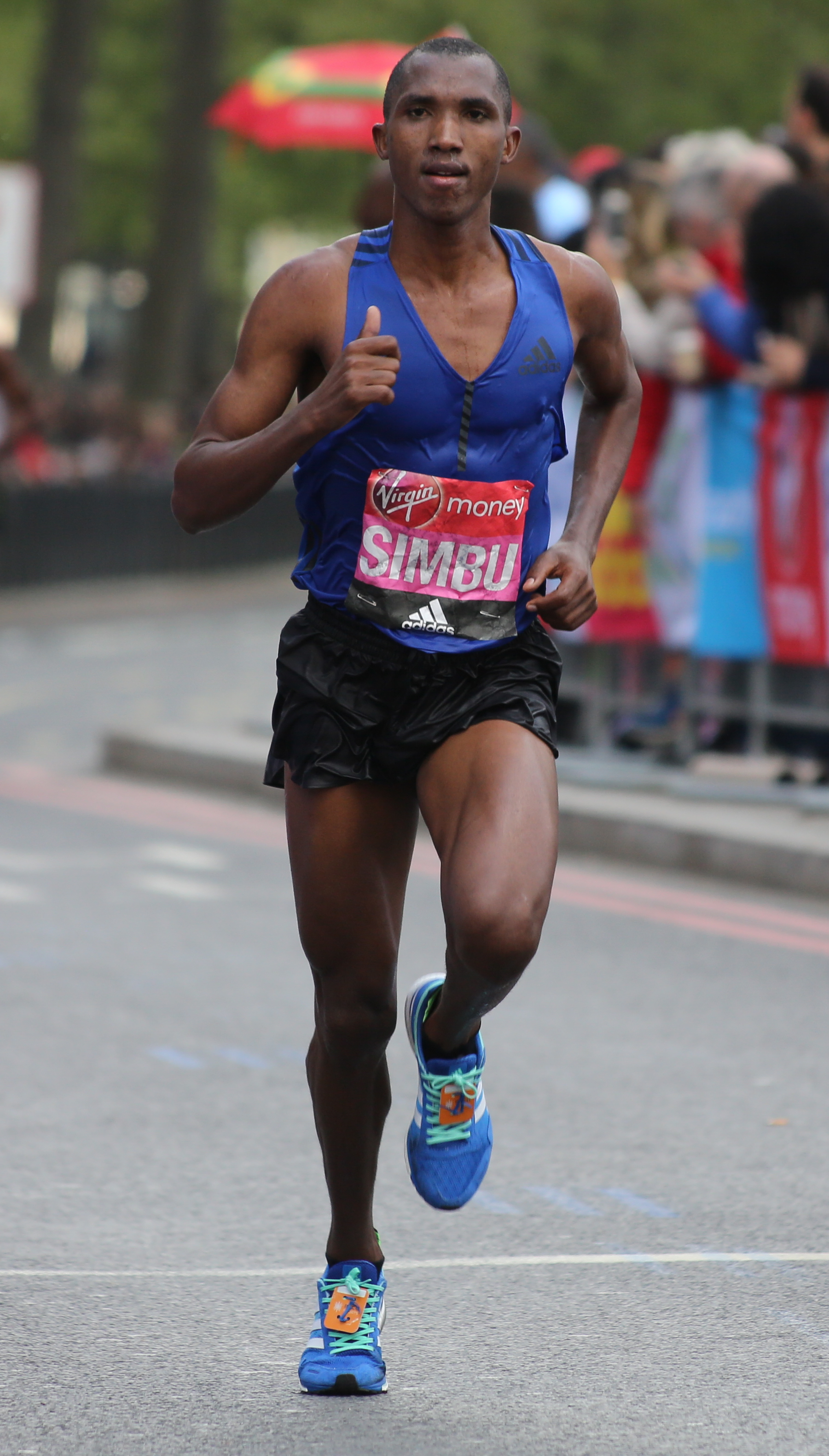
- Simbu at the 2017 London Marathon

Personal information
- Nationality: Tanzanian
- Born: 14 February 1992 (age 34)
- Weight: 55 kg (121 lb)

Sport
- Country: Tanzania
- Sport: Track and field
- Event: Marathon

Achievements and titles
- Personal bests: 2:02:47 NR (2026)
Medal record
Men's athletics
Representing Tanzania
World Championships
Gold medal – first place	2025 Tokyo	Marathon
Bronze medal – third place	2017 London	Marathon
World Marathon Majors
Silver medal – second place	2025 Boston	Marathon
Silver medal – second place	2026 Boston	Marathon
Commonwealth Games
Silver medal – second place	2022 Birmingham	Marathon

Alphonce Felix Simbu (born 14 February 1992) is a Tanzanian long-distance runner who specialises in the marathon. He is the reigning World Champion in marathon, having won the title at the 2025 World Athletics Championships, thus becoming the first Tanzanian athlete to win a gold medal at the World Championships or the Olympics.

== Career ==
Simbu competed in the marathon event at the 2015 World Championships in Athletics in Beijing, China.

Simbu competed for Tanzania at the 2016 Summer Olympics in the men's marathon. He finished 5th with a time of 2:11.15. He was the flag bearer for Tanzania during the closing ceremony.

Simbu won the 14th edition of the Mumbai Marathon on 15 January 2017. The same year he won the bronze medal at the 2017 World Athletics Championships Marathon with a time of 2:09:51.

In 2019, Simbu competed in the men's marathon at the 2019 World Athletics Championships held in Doha, Qatar. He finished in 16th place.

In June 2021, Simbu qualified to represent Tanzania at the 2020 Summer Olympics where he secured 7th place with a time of 2:11:35.

Simbu won a silver medal at the 2022 Commonwealth Games in the men's marathon event.

In December 2024, Simbu finished 4th in Valencia Marathon and set his personal best at 2:04:38.

Simbu finished second in the 2025 Boston Marathon, in a time of 2:05:04.

In 2025, Simbu became the first Tanzanian to win a gold medal in a world marathon championship after finishing first in the World Championships Marathon in Japan with a photo-finish win.

Simbu again finished second in the 2026 Boston Marathon, in a time of 2:02:47.
