= Fabiano Joseph Naasi =

Tanzanian long-distance runner

Fabiano Joseph Naasi (born December 24, 1985, in Babati, Manyara) is a Tanzanian long-distance runner.

== International competitions ==
Year	Competition	Venue	Position	Event	Notes
Representing Tanzania
2003	World Half Marathon Championships	Vilamoura, Portugal	2nd	Half Marathon	1:00:52
2004	World Cross Country Championships	Brussels, Belgium	7th	Long Race (12 km)	36:49
2004	World Junior Championships	Grosseto, Italy	6th	5000m	13:33.62
2004	World Junior Championships	Grosseto, Italy	2nd	10,000m	28:04.45
2004	World Half Marathon Championships	New Delhi, India	2nd	Half Marathon	1:02:31
2005	World Half Marathon Championships	Edmonton, Canada	1st	Half Marathon	1:01:08
2006	Commonwealth Games	Melbourne, Australia	5th	5,000 m	13:12.76
2006	Commonwealth Games	Melbourne, Australia	3rd	10,000 m	27:51.99
2015	World Championships	Beijing, China	42nd	Marathon	2:35:27

=== Road running competitions ===
- 2006 Bogota Half Marathon – 1st
