= Tanzania Olympic Committee =

National Olympic Committee

- Country: Tanzania
- Code: TAN
- Created: 1968
- Recognized: 1968
- Continental Association: ANOCA
- Headquarters: Dar es Salaam
- President: Gulam Abdulla Rashid
- Secretary General: Filbert Bayi Sanka
- Website: tanzaniaolympics.org

The Tanzania Olympic Committee (Swahili: Kamati ya Olimpiki Tanzania; IOC code: TAN) is the National Olympic Committee representing Tanzania. It was created and recognised by the IOC in 1968

Tanzania made its debut at the 1964 Summer Olympics in Tokyo where it was represented by four athletes.

== Presidents of Committee ==
- 2002 – Gulam Abdulla Rashid

== See also ==
- Tanzania at the Olympics
- Tanzania at the Commonwealth Games
