= Boxing at the 1990 Commonwealth Games =

Boxing competitions

- Venue: Logan Campbell Centre, Auckland Showgrounds
- Location: Auckland, New Zealand
- Dates: 24 January – 3 February 1990

Boxing at the 1990 Commonwealth Games was the 14th appearance of the Boxing at the Commonwealth Games. The events were held in Auckland, New Zealand, from 24 January – 3 February 1990 and featured contests in twelve weight classes.

The boxing events were held at the 3,000 seater Logan Campbell Centre on the Auckland Showgrounds.

Kenya topped the boxing medal table for the third time in four Games and third successive time for them, having boycotted the 1986 Games.

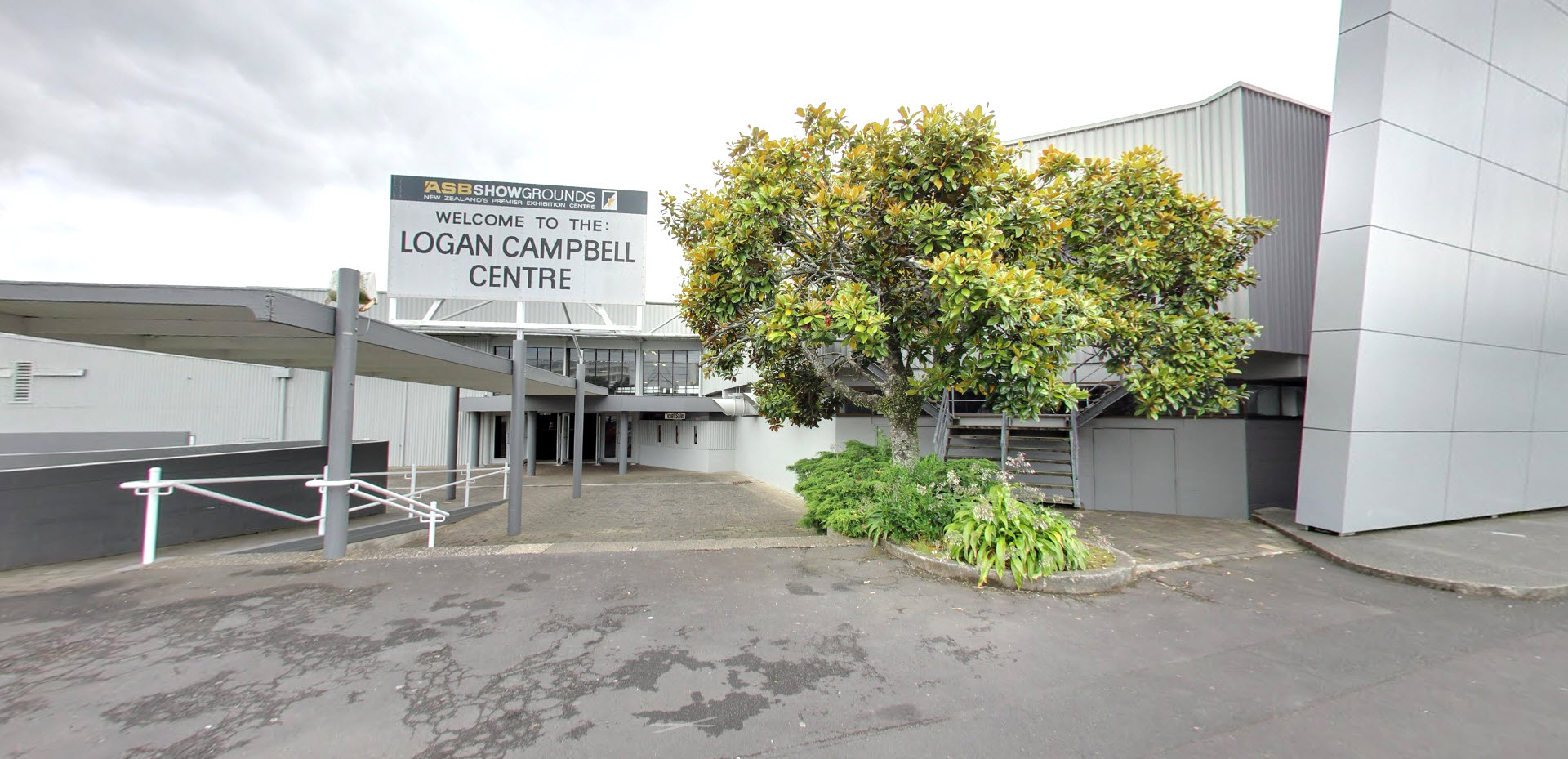
Logan Campbell Centre

== Medal table ==
* Host nation (New Zealand)

Rank	Nation	Gold	Silver	Bronze	Total
1	Kenya	2	2	2	6
2	Uganda	2	0	2	4
3	England	2	0	1	3
3	Nigeria	2	0	1	3
5	Canada	1	5	2	8
6	New Zealand*	1	0	2	3
7	Northern Ireland	1	0	1	2
7	Scotland	1	0	1	2
9	Ghana	0	2	0	2
10	Australia	0	1	3	4
11	Tanzania	0	1	1	2
11	Zimbabwe	0	1	1	2
13	Zambia	0	0	3	3
14	Samoa	0	0	2	2
15	Guyana	0	0	1	1
15	India	0	0	1	1
Totals (16 entries)		12	12	24	48

== Medallists ==
Event	Gold	Silver	Bronze
Light Flyweight	Justin Juuko (UGA)	Abdurahaman Ramadhani (KEN)	Domenic Figliomeni (CAN); Dharmendar Yadav (IND)
Flyweight	Wayne McCullough (NIR)	Nokuthula Tshabangu (ZIM)	Born Siwakwi (ZAM); Maurice Maina (KEN)
Bantamweight	Mohammed Sabo (NGR)	Geronimo Bie (CAN)	Justin Chikwanda (ZAM); Wesley Christmas (GUY)
Featherweight	John Irwin (ENG)	Haji Ally (TAN)	David Gakuha (KEN); Jamie Nicolson (AUS)
Lightweight	Godfrey Nyakana (UGA)	Justin Rowsell (AUS)	Bakari Mambeya (TAN); Dave Anderson (SCO)
Light Welterweight	Charlie Kane (SCO)	Nicodemus Odore (KEN)	Stefan Scriggins (AUS); Duke Chinyadza (ZIM)
Welterweight	David Defiagbon (NGR)	Greg Johnson (CAN)	Anthony Mwamba (ZAM); Grahame Cheney (AUS)
Light Middleweight	Richie Woodhall (ENG)	Ray Downey (CAN)	Sililo Figota (SAM); Andy Creery (NZL)
Middleweight	Chris Johnson (CAN)	Joseph Laryea (GHA)	Charles Matata (UGA); Mark Edwards (ENG)
Light Heavyweight	Joseph Akhasamba (KEN)	Dale Brown (CAN)	Nigel Anderson (NZL); Abdu Kaddu (UGA)
Heavyweight	George Onyango (KEN)	Pat Jordan (CAN)	Kevin Onwuka (NGR); Emerio Fainuulua (SAM)
Super Heavyweight	Michael Kenny (NZL)	Liadi Alhassan (GHA)	Vernon Linklater (CAN); Paul Douglas (NIR)

== Results ==
=== Light-flyweight 48kg ===
Round	Winner	Loser	Score
Preliminary	(Ghana) Stephen Dotse Ahialey	(Zambia) Shelton Siandavu	5:0
Preliminary	(Uganda) Justin Juuko	(England) Mickey Cantwell	KO 3
Quarter-Final	(India) Darmendra Yadaw	(Australia) Christopher Bryant	5:0
Quarter-Final	(Kenya) Abdurahman Ramadhani	(Scotland) Paul Weir	5:0
Quarter-Final	(Canada) Domenic Figliomeni	(Tanzania) Anthony Mwanglonda	4:1
Quarter-Final	(Uganda) Justin Juuko	(Ghana) Stephen Dotse Ahialey	3:2
Semi-Final	(Kenya) Abdurahman Ramadhani	(India) Darmendra Yadaw	4:1
Semi-Final	(Uganda) Justin Juuko	(Canada) Domenic Figliomeni	5:0
Final	(Uganda) Justin Juuko	(Kenya) Abdurahman Ramadhani	4:1

=== Flyweight 51kg ===
Round	Winner	Loser	Score
Preliminary	(India) Zoram Thanga	(Cook Islands) Pupuke Robati	RSC 1
Preliminary	(Tanzania) Ben Mwangata	(Lesotho) Teboho Mafatle	RSC 3
Preliminary	(Scotland) John McLean	(England) John Lyon	4:1
Preliminary	(Zambia) Born Siwakwi	(Ghana) Alex Baba	3:2
Preliminary	(Zimbabwe) Nokuthula Tshabangu	(Canada) Graham McIntosh	4:1
Quarter-Final	(Kenya) Maurice Maina	(Australia) Paul Wills	5:0
Quarter-Final	(Northern Ireland) Wayne McCullough	(Tanzania) Ben Mwangata	5:0
Quarter-Final	(Zambia) Born Siwakwi	(Scotland) John McLean	3:2
Quarter-Final	(Zimbabwe) Nokuthula Tshabangu	(India) Zoram Thanga	5:0
Semi-Final	(Northern Ireland) Wayne McCullough	(Kenya) Maurice Maina	5:0
Semi-Final	(Zimbabwe) Nokuthula Tshabangu	(Zambia) Born Siwakwi	5:0
Final	(Northern Ireland) Wayne McCullough	(Zimbabwe) Nokuthula Tshabangu	5:0

=== Bantamweight 54kg ===
Round	Winner	Loser	Score
Preliminary	(India) Manoj Pingale	(Cook Islands) Richard Pittman	RSC 3
Preliminary	(Zambia) Justin Chikwanda	(Northern Ireland) Paul Ireland	5:0
Preliminary	(Uganda) Fred Mutuweta	(England) Keith Howlett	5:0
Preliminary	(Australia) Eddie Younan	(Scotland) Wilson Docherty	4:1
Preliminary	(Canada) Geronimo Bie	(New Zealand) Danny Masterson	RSCH 1
Preliminary	(Nigeria) Mohammed Sabo	(Ghana) Sam Ampiah	KO 2
Quarter-Final	(Guyana) Wesley Christmas	(Kenya) Godfrey Maina	RSCH 2
Quarter-Final	(Zambia) Justin Chikwanda	(India) Manoj Pingale	3:2
Quarter-Final	(Canada) Geronimo Bie	(Australia) Eddie Younan	5:0
Quarter-Final	(Nigeria) Mohammed Sabo	(Uganda) Fred Mutuweta	5:0
Semi-Final	(Canada) Geronimo Bie	(Guyana) Wesley Christmas	4:1
Semi-Final	(Nigeria) Mohammed Sabo	(Zambia) Justin Chikwanda	5:0
Final	(Nigeria) Mohammed Sabo	(Canada) Geronimo Bie	4:1

=== Featherweight 57kg ===
Round	Winner	Loser	Score
Preliminary	(Zambia) Isaac Tembo	(Scotland) Mike Deveney	5:0
Preliminary	(Australia) Jamie Nicolson	(Papua New Guinea) Abdel Ando	KO 2
Preliminary	(England) John Irwin	(Cook Islands) Shane Samuel	5:0
Preliminary	(Canada) Michael Strange	(Guyana) Urshall Chandler	3:2
Quarter-Final	(Kenya) David Gakuha	(Zimbabwe) Trust Ndhlovu	5:0
Quarter-Final	(Tanzania) Haji Ally	(Wales) John Williams	5:0
Quarter-Final	(England) John Irwin	(Canada) Michael Strange	5:0
Quarter-Final	(Australia) Jamie Nicolson	(Zambia) Isaac Tembo	5:0
Semi-Final	(England) John Irwin	(Australia) Jamie Nicolson	DQ 3
Semi-Final	(Tanzania) Haji Ally	(Kenya) David Gakuha	4:1
Final	(England) John Irwin	(Tanzania) Haji Ally	5:0

=== Lightweight 60kg ===
Round	Winner	Loser	Score
Preliminary	(Nigeria) Rashidi Waheed	(Wales) Jason Matthews	5:0
Preliminary	(England) Peter Richardson	(Northern Ireland) John Erskine	4:1
Preliminary	(Scotland) Dave Anderson	(Papua New Guinea) Augustine Aba	RSCH 3
Preliminary	(Australia) Justin Rowsell	(Seychelles) Gerry Legras	5:0
Preliminary	(Uganda) Godfrey Nyakana	(New Zealand) Dave Wickenden	RSCH 2
Preliminary	(Canada) Billy Irwin	(Kenya) Charles Ojuang	4:1
Quarter-Final	(Tanzania) Mabwen Bakari	(Malawi) John Mkangala	5:0
Quarter-Final	(Scotland) Dave Anderson	(England) Peter Richardson	5:0
Quarter-Final	(Uganda) Godfrey Nyakana	(Nigeria) Rashidi Waheed	5:0
Quarter-Final	(Australia) Justin Rowsell	(Canada) Billy Irwin	5:0
Semi-Final	(Australia) Justin Rowsell	(Tanzania) Mabwen Bakari	4:1
Semi-Final	(Uganda) Godfrey Nyakana	(Scotland) Dave Anderson	3:2
Final	(Uganda) Godfrey Nyakana	(Australia) Justin Rowsell	3:2

=== Light-welterweight 63.5kg ===
Round	Winner	Loser	Score
Extra Preliminary	(Wales) Michael Smyth	(New Zealand) Nuka Wood	RSC 1
Extra Preliminary	(Nigeria) Moses James	(Tonga) Soakai Loumoli	KO 1
Preliminary	(Scotland) Charlie Kane	(Brunei) Mokmin Rahman	RSCH 2
Preliminary	(Kenya) Nick Odore	(Northern Ireland) Eddie Fisher	5:0
Preliminary	(Zimbabwe) Duke Chinyadza	(Lesotho) Motsamai Kheo	KO 2
Preliminary	(Uganda) Godfrey Wakaabu	(Seychelles) Jeffry Bonne	5:0
Preliminary	(Papua New Guinea) Jonas Bade	(Cook Islands) Torepai Maena	RSCH 1
Preliminary	(Australia) Stefan Scriggins	(Malawi) Lyton Mphande	5:0
Preliminary	(Zambia) Daniel Fulanse	(Canada) Jim Worrall	KO 2
Preliminary	(Nigeria) Moses James	(Wales) Michael Smyth	KO 1
Quarter-Final	(Australia) Stefan Scriggins	(Zambia) Daniel Fulanse	3:2
Quarter-Final	(Zimbabwe) Duke Chinyadza	(Uganda) Godfrey Wakaabu	5:0
Quarter-Final	(Kenya) Nick Odore	(Papua New Guinea) Jonas Bade	5:0
Quarter-Final	(Scotland) Charlie Kane	(Nigeria) Moses James	3:2
Semi-Final	(Scotland) Charlie Kane	(Australia) Stefan Scriggins	5:0
Semi-Final	(Kenya) Nick Odore	(Zimbabwe) Duke Chinyadza	5:0
Final	(Scotland) Charlie Kane	(Kenya) Nick Odore	3:2

=== Welterweight 67kg ===
Round	Winner	Loser	Score
Extra preliminary	(Sri Lanka) Saman Gunaratne	(Solomon Islands) Joshua Kissini	KO 3
Extra preliminary	(Papua New Guinea) Moses Kelets	(Lesotho) Possa Setemmere	5:0
Preliminary	(England) Robert McCracken	(The Bahamas) Freeman Barr	5:0
Preliminary	(Papua New Guinea) Moses Kelets	(Sri Lanka) Saman Gunaratne	RSCH 2
Preliminary	(Ghana) Alfred Ankamah	(New Zealand) Danny Morris	RSCH 2
Preliminary	(Kenya) Ali Athumani	(Samoa) Asomua Naea	RSC 2
Preliminary	(Australia) Grahame Cheney	(Tanzania) Joseph Marva	4:1
Preliminary	(Canada) Greg Johnson	(Northern Ireland) Joe Lowe	3:2
Preliminary	(Nigeria) David Defiagbon	(Scotland) Jim Pender	RSCH 3
Preliminary	(Zambia) Anthony Mwamba	(Seychelles) Matthew Esparon	RSC 1
Quarter-Final	(Zambia) Anthony Mwamba	(Papua New Guinea) Moses Kelets	KO 1
Quarter-Final	(Australia) Grahame Cheney	(Kenya) Ali Athumani	4:1
Quarter-Final	(Canada) Greg Johnson	(England) Robert McCracken	3:2
Quarter-Final	(Nigeria) David Defiagbon	(Ghana) Alfred Ankamah	5:0
Semi-Final	(Canada) Greg Johnson	(Australia) Grahame Cheney	RSCH 1
Semi-Final	(Nigeria) David Defiagbon	(Zambia) Anthony Mwamba	4:1
Final	(Nigeria) David Defiagbon	(Canada) Greg Johnson	5:0

=== Light-middleweight 71kg ===
Round	Winner	Loser	Score
Preliminary	(Pakistan) Syed Abrar Hussain Shah	(Lesotho) Sello Mojela	5:0
Preliminary	(Samoa) Sililo Figota	(The Bahamas) Jarvis Rodgers	5:0
Preliminary	(Kenya) Omari Kasongo	(Northern Ireland) Jim Webb	5:0
Preliminary	(Trinidad and Tobago) John Marvin Penniston	(Scotland) Steven Morrison	5:0
Preliminary	(New Zealand) Andy Creery	(India) Gopal Dewang	4:1
Preliminary	(Canada) Ray Downey	(Australia) Garry Large	DQ 3
Quarter-Final	(England) Richie Woodhall	(Seychelles) Rival Cadeau	4:1
Quarter-Final	(Canada) Ray Downey	(Kenya) Omari Kasongo	5:0
Quarter-Final	(New Zealand) Andy Creery	(Trinidad and Tobago) John Marvin Penniston	KO 2
Quarter-Final	(Samoa) Sililo Figota	(Pakistan) Syed Abrar Hussain Shah	5:0
Semi-Final	(England) Richie Woodhall	(Samoa) Sililo Figota	5:0
Semi-Final	(Canada) Ray Downey	(New Zealand) Andy Creery	RSCH 2
Final	(England) Richie Woodhall	(Canada) Ray Downey	4:1

=== Middleweight 75kg ===
Round	Winner	Loser	Score
Preliminary	(Scotland) Stephen Wilson	(Pakistan) Hussain Shah	5:0
Preliminary	(New Zealand) Michael Bell	(Malawi) Mtendare Makalamba	5:0
Preliminary	(England) Mark Edwards	(India) Mukund Killekar	RSCH 2
Preliminary	(Ghana) Joseph Laryea	(Kenya) Charles Waithaka	5:0
Preliminary	(Canada) Chris Johnson	(Australia) Greg Ward	5:0
Quarter-Final	(Uganda) Charles Matata	(Brunei) Ismail Ali	RSCI 1
Quarter-Final	(Ghana) Joseph Laryea	(Samoa) King Faoa Wong	KO 1
Quarter-Final	(England) Mark Edwards	(New Zealand) Michael Bell	RSCH 3
Quarter-Final	(Canada) Chris Johnson	(Scotland) Stephen Wilson	RSCH 2
Semi-Final	(Ghana) Joseph Laryea	(Uganda) Charles Matata	AB 2
Semi-Final	(Canada) Chris Johnson	(England) Mark Edwards	3:2
Final	(Canada) Chris Johnson	(Ghana) Joseph Laryea	5:0

=== Light-heavyweight 81kg ===
Round	Winner	Loser	Score
Preliminary	(New Zealand) Nigel Anderson	(Scotland) Andrew Caulfield	5:0
Preliminary	(England) Monty Wright	(Tonga) Sione Vaveni Taliaʻuli	4:1
Preliminary	(Canada) Dale Brown	(Seychelles) Olderick Esparon	5:0
Quarter-Final	(Uganda) Joseph Abdul Kaddu	(Malawi) Herman Palije	5:0
Quarter-Final	(Canada) Joseph Akhasamba	(Samoa) Fulu Faalenuu	RSCI 2
Quarter-Final	(New Zealand) Dale Brown	(Australia) Meldon Orr	RSC 2
Quarter-Final	(New Zealand) Nigel Anderson	(England) Monty Wright	w/o
Semi-Final	(Canada) Dale Brown	(New Zealand) Nigel Anderson	4:1
Semi-Final	(Kenya) Joseph Akhasamba	(Uganda) Joseph Abdul Kaddu	5:0
Final	(Kenya) Joseph Akhasamba	(Canada) Dale Brown	AB 3

=== Heavyweight 91kg ===
Round	Winner	Loser	Score
Quarter-Final	(Nigeria) Kevin Onwuka	(Australia) Justin Fortune	4:1
Quarter-Final	(Kenya) George Onyango	(Uganda) Eliphers Mubiru	RSCH 2
Semi-Final	(Canada) Pat Jordan	(Samoa) Emerio Fainuulua	4:1
Semi-Final	(Kenya) George Onyango	(Nigeria) Kevin Onwuka	4:1
Final	(Kenya) George Onyango	(Canada) Pat Jordan	5:0

=== Super Heavyweight +91kg ===
Round	Winner	Loser	Score
Preliminary	(Nigeria) Sunday Abiodun	(England) Pat Passley	4:1
Quarter-Final	(Northern Ireland) Paul Douglas	(Tonga) Taulau Fale	RSCH 2
Quarter-Final	(Canada) Vernon Linklater	(Australia) Paul Gatti	3:2
Quarter-Final	(New Zealand) Michael Kenny	(Wales) Kevin McCormack	5:0
Quarter-Final	(Ghana) Liadi Al-Hassan	(Nigeria) Sunday Abiodun	KO 1
Semi-Final	(New Zealand) Michael Kenny	(Canada) Vernon Linklater	5:0
Semi-Final	(Ghana) Liadi Al-Hassan	(Northern Ireland) Paul Douglas	RSCI 3
Final	(New Zealand) Michael Kenny	(Ghana) Liadi Al-Hassan	5:0

== See also ==
- Boxing at the 1950 British Empire Games
