= Samoa at the Commonwealth Games =

- CG code: SAM
- CGA: Samoa Association of Sports and National Olympic Committee
- Website: sasnoc.com
- Medals Ranked 23rd: Gold 6 Silver 12 Bronze 11 Total 29

Commonwealth Games appearances (overview)
- 1974; 1978; 1982; 1986; 1990; 1994; 1998; 2002; 2006; 2010; 2014; 2018; 2022; 2026; 2030

Samoa has competed in twelve of the twenty-one previous Commonwealth Games, from 1974 as Western Samoa, and from 1997 as Samoa.

== Overall Medal Tally ==
With sixteen medals, Samoa were thirtieth in the All-time tally of medals after the 2010 Games.

	Gold	Silver	Bronze	Total	Rank
Samoa	6	12	11	29	23

Games	Gold	Silver	Bronze	Total
1974 Christchurch	0	1	1	2
1978 Edmonton	0	0	3	3
1982 Brisbane	0	0	0	0
1986 Edinburgh	0	0	0	0
1990 Auckland	0	0	2	2
1994 Victoria	0	1	0	1
1998 Kuala Lumpur	0	0	0	0
2002 Manchester	0	1	2	3
2006 Melbourne	0	0	1	1
2010 Delhi	3	0	1	4
2014 Glasgow	0	2	1	3
2018 Gold Coast	2	3	0	5
2022 Birmingham	1	4	0	5
Totals (13 entries)	6	12	11	29

{{Medalists

Medal	Name	Games	Sport	Event
Silver	Paul Wallwork	1974 Christchurch	Weightlifting	Men's light heavyweight
Bronze	Vai Samu	1974 Christchurch	Boxing	Men's heavyweight
Bronze	Ropati Vipo Samu	1978 Edmonton	Boxing	Men's light middleweight
Bronze	Richard Betham	1978 Edmonton	Boxing	Men's middleweight
Bronze	Fautala Su'a	1978 Edmonton	Boxing	Men's light heavyweight
Bronze	Sililo Figota	1990 Auckland	Boxing	Men's light middleweight
Bronze	Emerio Fainuulua	1990 Auckland	Boxing	Men's heavyweight
Silver	Bob Gasio	1994 Victoria	Boxing	Men's middleweight
Silver	Ofisa Ofisa	2002 Manchester	Boxing	Men's 85 kg clean and jerk
Bronze	Ofisa Ofisa	2002 Manchester	Boxing	Men's 85 kg total
Bronze	Niusila Opeloge	2002 Manchester	Boxing	Men's 85 kg snatch
Bronze	Warren Fuavailili	2006 Melbourne	Boxing	Men's middleweight
Gold	Faavae Faauliuli	2010 Delhi	Weightlifting	Men's 94 kg
Gold	Niusila Opeloge	2010 Delhi	Weightlifting	Men's 105 kg
Gold	Ele Opeloge	2010 Delhi	Weightlifting	Women's +75 kg
Bronze	Margaret Satupai	2010 Delhi	Athletics	Women's shot put
Silver	Mary Opeloge	2014 Glasgow	Weightlifting	Women's 75 kg
Silver	Ele Opeloge	2014 Glasgow	Weightlifting	Women's +75 kg
Bronze	Vaipava Ioane	2014 Glasgow	Weightlifting	Men's 62 kg
Gold	Sanele Mao	2018 Gold Coast	Weightlifting	Men's 105 kg
Gold	Feiagaiga Stowers	2018 Gold Coast	Weightlifting	Women's +90 kg
Silver	Don Opeloge	2018 Gold Coast	Weightlifting	Men's 85 kg
Silver	Lauititi Lui	2018 Gold Coast	Weightlifting	Men's +105 kg
Silver	Ato Plodzicki-Faoagali	2018 Gold Coast	Boxing	Men's light heavyweight

== Medals by sport ==
Nation	Gold	Silver	Bronze	Total
Weightlifting	5	5	1	11
Boxing	0	3	10	13
Athletics	0	0	1	1
Totals (3 entries)	5	8	12	25

== See also ==
- All-time medal tally of Commonwealth Games
