= Tanzania at the 1990 Commonwealth Games =

- CGF code: TAN
- CGA: Tanzania Olympic Committee
- Website: noctanzania.org

in Auckland, New Zealand
- Flag bearers: Opening: Closing:
- Medals Ranked =24thth: Gold 0 Silver 1 Bronze 2 Total 3

Commonwealth Games appearances (overview)
- 1962; 1966; 1970; 1974; 1978; 1982; 1986; 1990; 1994; 1998; 2002; 2006; 2010; 2014; 2018; 2022; 2026; 2030

Tanzania competed at the 1990 Commonwealth Games in Auckland, New Zealand by a nine-member strong contingent, collecting a total number of three medals (one silver, two bronze).

== Medals ==
=== Silver ===
(silver) Haji Ally — Athletics, Men's Featherweight (– 57 kg)

=== Bronze ===
(bronze) Simon Robert Naali — Athletics, Men's Marathon

(bronze) Bakari Mambeya — Athletics, Men's Lightweight (– 60 kg)

== Competitors by event ==
Men's Marathon

- Simon Robert Naali
- Alfredo Shahanga
- Juma Ikangaa

Women's Javelin

- Matilda Kasava

=== Boxing ===
Men's Light Flyweight (– 48 kg)

- Anthony Mwang'onda

- Lost to Domenic Figliomeni (CAN), 1-4

Men's Flyweight (– 51 kg)

- Benjamin Mwangata

- Defeated Teboho Mafatle (LES), RSC-3
- Lost to Wayne McCullough (IRL), 0-5

Men's Featherweight (– 57 kg)

- Haji Ally

- Defeated John Williams (WAL), 5-0
- Defeated David Gakuha (KEN), 4-1
- Lost to John Irwin (ENG), 0-5

Men's Lightweight (– 60 kg)

- Bakari Mambeya

- Defeated John Mkangala (MLW), 5-0
- Lost to Justin Rowsell (AUS), 1-4

Men's Welterweight (– 67 kg)

- Joseph Marwa

- Lost to Grahame Cheney (AUS), 1-4

== See also ==
- Tanzania at the 1988 Summer Olympics
- Tanzania at the 1992 Summer Olympics
