= Western Samoa at the 1990 Commonwealth Games =

- CG code: SAM
- CGA: Samoa Association of Sports and National Olympic Committee
- Website: oceaniasport.com/samoa

in Auckland, New Zealand
- Medals: Gold 0 Silver 0 Bronze 2 Total 2

Commonwealth Games appearances (overview)
- 1974; 1978; 1982; 1986; 1990; 1994; 1998; 2002; 2006; 2010; 2014; 2018; 2022; 2026; 2030

Western Samoa at the 1990 Commonwealth Games was abbreviated SAM.

== Medals ==
	Gold	Silver	Bronze	Total
Western Samoa	0	0	2	2

=== Gold ===
- none

=== Silver ===
- none

=== Bronze ===
- Sililo Figota — Boxing, Men's Light Middleweight
- Emerio Fainuulua — Boxing, Men's Heavyweight
