= Samoa at the 2018 Commonwealth Games =

- Flag of Samoa
- CG code: SAM
- CGA: Samoa Association of Sports and National Olympic Committee
- Website: oceaniasport.com/samoa

in Gold Coast, Australia 4 April 2018 – 15 April 2018
- Competitors: 38 in 7 sports
- Flag bearer: Lauititi Lui (opening)
- Medals Ranked 17th: Gold 2 Silver 3 Bronze 0 Total 5

Commonwealth Games appearances (overview)
- 1974; 1978; 1982; 1986; 1990; 1994; 1998; 2002; 2006; 2010; 2014; 2018; 2022; 2026; 2030

Samoa competed at the 2018 Commonwealth Games in the Gold Coast, Australia from April 4 to April 15, 2018.

Weightlifter Lauititi Lui was the island's flag bearer during the opening ceremony.

== Competitors ==
The following is the list of number of competitors participating at the Games per sport/discipline.

| Sport | Men | Women | Total |
|---|---|---|---|
| Athletics | 6 | 0 | 6 |
| Boxing | 4 | 0 | 4 |
| Lawn bowls | 2 | 0 | 2 |
| Rugby sevens | 13 | 0 | 13 |
| Shooting | 4 | 0 | 4 |
| Swimming | 1 | 2 | 3 |
| Weightlifting | 5 | 1 | 6 |
| Total | 35 | 3 | 38 |

== Medalists ==
| Medal | Name | Sport | Event | Date |
|---|---|---|---|---|
| Gold | Sanele Mao | Weightlifting | Men's −105 kg | April 9 |
| Gold | Feiagaiga Stowers | Weightlifting | Women's +90 kg | April 9 |
| Silver | Don Opeloge | Weightlifting | Men's −85 kg | April 7 |
| Silver | Lauititi Lui | Weightlifting | Men's +105 kg | April 9 |
| Silver | Ato Plodzicki-Faoagali | Boxing | Men's −81 kg | April 14 |

Medals by sport
| Sport | 1st place, gold medalist(s) | 2nd place, silver medalist(s) | 3rd place, bronze medalist(s) | Total |
| Boxing | 0 | 1 | 0 | 1 |
| Weightlifting | 2 | 2 | 0 | 4 |
| Total | 2 | 3 | 0 | 5 |

Medals by date
| Day | Date | 1st place, gold medalist(s) | 2nd place, silver medalist(s) | 3rd place, bronze medalist(s) | Total |
| 1 | 5 April | 0 | 0 | 0 | 0 |
| 2 | 6 April | 0 | 0 | 0 | 0 |
| 3 | 7 April | 0 | 1 | 0 | 1 |
| 4 | 8 April | 0 | 0 | 0 | 0 |
| 5 | 9 April | 2 | 1 | 0 | 3 |
| 6 | 10 April | 0 | 0 | 0 | 0 |
| 7 | 11 April | 0 | 0 | 0 | 0 |
| 8 | 12 April | 0 | 0 | 0 | 0 |
| 9 | 13 April | 0 | 0 | 0 | 0 |
| 10 | 14 April | 0 | 1 | 0 | 0 |
| 11 | 15 April | 0 | 0 | 0 | 0 |
| Total | | 2 | 3 | 0 | 5 |

Medals by gender
| Gender | 1st place, gold medalist(s) | 2nd place, silver medalist(s) | 3rd place, bronze medalist(s) | Total |
| Female | 1 | 0 | 0 | 1 |
| Male | 1 | 3 | 0 | 4 |
| Mixed | 0 | 0 | 0 | 0 |
| Total | 2 | 3 | 0 | 5 |

== Athletics ==
Samoa participated with 6 athletes (6 men).

Men
Track & road events

| Athlete | Event | Heat | | Semifinal | | Final | |
| Athlete | Event | Result | Rank | Result | Rank | Result | Rank |
|---|---|---|---|---|---|---|---|
| Shupeng Ah Vui | 100 m | 11.33 | 7 | Did not advance | | | |
| Jeremy Dodson | 100 m | 15.47 | 8 | Did not advance | | | |
| Kelvin Masoe | 100 m | 10.72 | 5 | Did not advance | | | |
| Jeremy Dodson | 200 m | DNF | | Did not advance | | | |
| Kelvin Masoe | 200 m | 21.98 | 7 | Did not advance | | | |
| Kolone Alefosio | 110 m hurdles | 15.10 | 9 | —N/a | | Did not advance | |

Field events

| Athlete | Event | Qualification | | Final | |
| Athlete | Event | Distance | Rank | Distance | Rank |
|---|---|---|---|---|---|
| Alex Rose | Discus throw | 59.11 | 8 q | 59.56 | 8 |
| Donny Tuimaseve | Javelin throw | 67.78 | 17 | Did not advance | |

== Boxing ==
Samoa participated with a team of 4 athletes (4 men).

Men

| Athlete | Event | Round of 32 | Round of 16 | Quarterfinals | Semifinals | Final | Rank |
| Athlete | Event | Opposition Result | Opposition Result | Opposition Result | Opposition Result | Opposition Result | Rank |
|---|---|---|---|---|---|---|---|
| Valentin Kondakov | −64 kg | BYE | Jonas (NAM); L RSC | Did not advance | | | |
| Henry Tyrell | −75 kg | Paneng (LES); W RSC | Hodge (AIA); W 5 - 0 | Donnelly (NIR); L 0 - 5 | Did not advance | | |
| Ato Plodzicki-Faoagali | −81 kg | —N/a | Darby (JAM); W 5 - 0 | Khan (PAK); W 5 - 0 | Reilly (CAN); W 4 - 1 | Lee (WAL); L 0 - 5 | 2nd place, silver medalist(s) |
| Frank Masoe | −91 kg | —N/a | BYE | Tanwar (IND); L 0 - 5 | Did not advance | | |

== Lawn bowls ==
Samoa will compete in Lawn bowls.

| Athlete | Event | Group stage | | | | | | Quarterfinal | Semifinal | Final / BM | |
| Athlete | Event | Opposition Score | Opposition Score | Opposition Score | Opposition Score | Opposition Score | Rank | Opposition Score | Opposition Score | Opposition Score | Rank |
|---|---|---|---|---|---|---|---|---|---|---|---|
| Edward Bell | Men's Singles | Burnett (SCO); L 2 - 21 | Priaulx (GUE); L 3 - 21 | Omar (BRU); L 12 - 21 | Rusli (MAS); L 12 - 21 | Tagelagi (NIU); W 21 - 15 | 5 | Did not advance | | | |
| Edward Bell; Herbert Bell | Men's Pairs | Norfolk Island; L 6 - 23 | Scotland; L 6 - 37 | Malaysia; L 6 - 30 | India; L 4 - 26 | Niue; L 17 - 18 | 6 | Did not advance | | | |

== Rugby sevens ==
=== Men's tournament ===
Samoa qualified a men's team of 12 athletes by being among the top nine ranked nations from the Commonwealth in the 2016–17 World Rugby Sevens Series ranking.

Roster

- David Afamasaga
- Elisapeta Alofipo
- Tomasi Alosio Logotuli
- Neira Fomai
- Laaloi Leilua
- Tila Mealoi
- Alamanda Motuga
- Murphy Paulo
- Paul Perez
- Tofatu Solia
- Alatasi Tupou
- Jacob Whitaker Ale

Pool B

| Pos | Team | Pld | W | D | L | PF | PA | PD | Pts | Qualification |
|---|---|---|---|---|---|---|---|---|---|---|
| 1 | England | 3 | 3 | 0 | 0 | 97 | 22 | +75 | 9 | Semi-finals |
| 2 | Australia | 3 | 2 | 0 | 1 | 73 | 38 | +35 | 7 | Classification semi-finals |
| 3 | Samoa | 3 | 1 | 0 | 2 | 43 | 64 | −21 | 5 | |
| 4 | Jamaica | 3 | 0 | 0 | 3 | 17 | 106 | −89 | 3 | |

Source: GC2018
Rules for classification: 1) Points; 2) Head-to-head result; 3) Point difference; 4) Points scored.

14 April 2018
9:31

| Australia | 24–7 | Samoa |
| Try: Anderson (2) 3' c, 5' m Longbottom 6' m Connor 9' c Con: Lucas (1/2) 3'; Porch (1/2) 9' | (Gold Coast 2018) | Try: Fomai 1' c Con: Mealoi (1/1) 1' |

Robina Stadium, Gold Coast
Referee: Sam Grove-White (Scotland)

14 April 2018
13:33

| England | 33–0 | Samoa |
| Try: Bibby (2) 2' m, 5' c Mitchell 3' c Glover 7' c Lindsay-Hague 10' c Con: Mitchell (4/5) 4', 5', 7', 11' | (Gold Coast 2018) |

Robina Stadium, Gold Coast
Referee: Rasta Rasivhenge (South Africa)

14 April 2018
19:43

| Samoa | 36–7 | Jamaica |
| Try: Tupou 1' c Alofipo 3' c Afamasaga (2) 7' m, 8' c Paulo 11' m Motuga 12' m Con: Tupou (2/3) 1', 8'; Alosio Logotuli (1/2) 3'; Paulo (0/1) | (Gold Coast 2018) | Try: Richards 10' c Con: Adamson (1/1) 11' |

Robina Stadium, Gold Coast
Referee: Jordan Way (Australia)

== Shooting ==
Samoa participated with 4 athletes (4 men).

Men

| Athlete | Event | Qualification | | Final | |
| Athlete | Event | Points | Rank | Points | Rank |
|---|---|---|---|---|---|
| Sigfried Levi | Trap | 95 | 32 | Did not advance | |
| Paul Loibl | Trap | 92 | 35 | Did not advance | |
| Francis Caffarelli | Double trap | 98 | 19 | Did not advance | |
| Ioane Galuvao | Double trap | 75 | 25 | Did not advance | |

== Swimming ==
Samoa participated with 3 athletes (1 man and 2 women).

Men

| Athlete | Event | Heat | | Semifinal | | Final | |
| Athlete | Event | Time | Rank | Time | Rank | Time | Rank |
|---|---|---|---|---|---|---|---|
| Brandon Schuster | 50 m freestyle | 24.19 | 34 | Did not advance | | | |
| Brandon Schuster | 100 m freestyle | 51.95 | 33 | Did not advance | | | |
| Brandon Schuster | 400 m freestyle | 4:03.50 | 12 | —N/a | | Did not advance | |
| Brandon Schuster | 200 m individual medley | 2:08.44 | 19 | —N/a | | Did not advance | |
| Brandon Schuster | 400 m individual medley | 4:31.99 | 10 | —N/a | | Did not advance | |

Women

| Athlete | Event | Heat | | Semifinal | | Final | |
| Athlete | Event | Time | Rank | Time | Rank | Time | Rank |
|---|---|---|---|---|---|---|---|
| Lushavel Stickland | 50 m freestyle | 26.84 | 17 | Did not advance | | | |
| Lushavel Stickland | 100 m freestyle | 59.01 | 21 | Did not advance | | | |
| Lushavel Stickland | 50 m backstroke | 30.14 | 19 | Did not advance | | | |
| Lushavel Stickland | 100 m backstroke | 1:06.02 | 21 | Did not advance | | | |
| Alania Suttie | 800 m freestyle | DNS | | —N/a | | Did not advance | |
| Alania Suttie | 200 m butterfly | DNS | | —N/a | | Did not advance | |
| Alania Suttie | 200 m individual medley | 2:30.23 | 15 | —N/a | | Did not advance | |
| Alania Suttie | 400 m individual medley | 5:23.97 | 12 | —N/a | | Did not advance | |

== Weightlifting ==
Samoa participated with 6 athletes (5 men and 1 woman).

Men

| Athlete | Event | Snatch | | Clean & jerk | | Total | Rank |
| Athlete | Event | Result | Rank | Result | Rank | Total | Rank |
|---|---|---|---|---|---|---|---|
| Vaipava Ioane | −69 kg | 125 | 6 | 167 | 1 | 292 | 4 |
| Don Opeloge | −85 kg | 151 | 1 | 180 | 4 | 331 | 2nd place, silver medalist(s) |
| Siaosi Leuo | −94 kg | 156 | 3 | Did not finish | | | |
| Sanele Mao | −105 kg | 154 | 1 | 206 | 1 | 360 | 1st place, gold medalist(s) |
| Lauititi Lui | +105 kg | 175 | 1 | 225 | 2 | 400 | 2nd place, silver medalist(s) |

Women

| Athlete | Event | Snatch | | Clean & jerk | | Total | Rank |
| Athlete | Event | Result | Rank | Result | Rank | Total | Rank |
|---|---|---|---|---|---|---|---|
| Feiagaiga Stowers | +90 kg | 113 | 1 | 140 | 2 | 253 | 1st place, gold medalist(s) |

== See also ==
- Samoa at the 2018 Summer Youth Olympics
