= Samoa at the 2006 Commonwealth Games =

- CG code: SAM
- CGA: Samoa Association of Sports and National Olympic Committee
- Website: oceaniasport.com/samoa

in Melbourne, Australia
- Flag bearers: Opening: Closing:
- Medals Ranked 35th: Gold 0 Silver 0 Bronze 1 Total 1

Commonwealth Games appearances (overview)
- 1974; 1978; 1982; 1986; 1990; 1994; 1998; 2002; 2006; 2010; 2014; 2018; 2022; 2026; 2030

Samoa was represented at the 2006 Commonwealth Games in Melbourne.

== Medals ==
	(gold)	(silver)	(bronze)	Total
Samoa	0	0	1	1

== Medalists ==
=== Bronze ===
- Warren Fuavailili, Boxing, Middleweight 75 kg

== Netball ==
With a team captained by Frances Solia and coached by Linda Vagana, Samoa finished 5th in the netball at the 2006 Commonwealth Games. In the 5th/6th playoff, they defeated Malawi 53–50.

Pool 2

Saturday 18 March; 15:00 (UTC+11)	Stats	Singapore	33–76	Samoa	Umpires: Michelle Phippard; Carolene Logan; Reserve umpire: Jacqui Jashari
Saturday 18 March; 15:00 (UTC+11)	Stats	Scoring by quarter: 6-21, 10-18, 9-16, 8-21			Umpires: Michelle Phippard; Carolene Logan; Reserve umpire: Jacqui Jashari
Saturday 18 March; 15:00 (UTC+11)	Stats	Jeanine Heng Wei Ping 12/15 (80%); Li Ling 9/11 (82%); Tan Hui Yan 8/8 (100%); Pearline Chan 2/2 (100%); Chen Hui Fen 2/4 (50%)		Cathrine Latu 44/51 (86%); Monika Fuimaono 15/16 (94%); Malu Fa'asavalu 13/17 (76%); Ida Vaai 3/7 (43%); Monalisa Tofilau 1/1 (100%)	Umpires: Michelle Phippard; Carolene Logan; Reserve umpire: Jacqui Jashari

Sunday 19 March; 20:30 (UTC+11)	Report; Stats	Samoa	49–42	Wales	Umpires: Stacey Campton; Amanda Nottingham; Reserve umpire: Jacqui Jashari
Sunday 19 March; 20:30 (UTC+11)	Report; Stats	Scoring by quarter: 17-10, 9-15, 12-7, 11-10			Umpires: Stacey Campton; Amanda Nottingham; Reserve umpire: Jacqui Jashari
Sunday 19 March; 20:30 (UTC+11)	Report; Stats	Cathrine Latu 40/44 (91%); Malu Fa'asavalu 9/16 (56%); Aloma Inu 0/1 (0%)		Rebecca James 31/41 (76%); Amanda Evans 11/18 (61%)	Umpires: Stacey Campton; Amanda Nottingham; Reserve umpire: Jacqui Jashari

Tuesday 21 March; 15:00 (UTC+11)	Report; Stats	Australia	78–47	Samoa	Umpires: Anne Abraitis; Bobbi Brown; Reserve umpire: Pauline Sciascia
Tuesday 21 March; 15:00 (UTC+11)	Report; Stats	Scoring by quarter: 23-9, 23-14, 14-11, 18-13			Umpires: Anne Abraitis; Bobbi Brown; Reserve umpire: Pauline Sciascia
Tuesday 21 March; 15:00 (UTC+11)	Report; Stats	Susan Pratley 28/30 (93%); Catherine Cox 20/25 (80%); Sharelle McMahon 18/20 (90%); Megan Dehn 12/13 (92%)		Monika Fuimaono 27/36 (75%); Malu Fa'asavalu 13/21 (62%); Cathrine Latu 7/10 (70%)	Umpires: Anne Abraitis; Bobbi Brown; Reserve umpire: Pauline Sciascia

Wednesday 22 March; 13:00 (UTC+11)	Stats	Samoa	45–41	Barbados	Umpires: Stacey Campton; Pauline Sciascia; Reserve umpire: Carolene Logan
Wednesday 22 March; 13:00 (UTC+11)	Stats	Scoring by quarter: 13-9, 13-7, 12-14, 8-11			Umpires: Stacey Campton; Pauline Sciascia; Reserve umpire: Carolene Logan
Wednesday 22 March; 13:00 (UTC+11)	Stats	Monika Fuimaono 28/41 (68%); Malu Fa'asavalu 17/23 (74%)		Lydia Bishop 27/33 (82%); Latonia Blackman 7/8 (88%); Laurel Browne 7/11 (64%)	Umpires: Stacey Campton; Pauline Sciascia; Reserve umpire: Carolene Logan

Thursday 23 March; 21:00 (UTC+11)	Stats	Samoa	47–60	Jamaica	Umpires: Bronwyn Meek; Marion Johnson-Hurley; Reserve umpire: Amanda Nottingham
Thursday 23 March; 21:00 (UTC+11)	Stats	Scoring by quarter: 13-19, 13-16, 14-12, 7-13			Umpires: Bronwyn Meek; Marion Johnson-Hurley; Reserve umpire: Amanda Nottingham
Thursday 23 March; 21:00 (UTC+11)	Stats	Cathrine Latu 45/49 (92%); Malu Fa'asavalu 2/6 (33%)		Elaine Davis 43/46 (93%); Simone Forbes 17/18 (94%)	Umpires: Bronwyn Meek; Marion Johnson-Hurley; Reserve umpire: Amanda Nottingham

Table

Pos	Team	P	W	D	L	GF	GA	GD	Pts
1	Australia	5	4	1	0	387	169	+218	9
2	Jamaica	5	4	1	0	324	174	+150	9
3	Samoa	5	3	0	2	264	254	+10	6
4	Wales	5	2	0	3	185	271	-86	4
5	Barbados	5	2	0	3	183	279	-96	4
6	Singapore	5	0	0	5	150	346	-196	0

Qualified for Semi-finals
Qualified for Classification

5th/6th playoff

Friday 24 March; 20:30 (UTC+11)	Report; Stats	Samoa	53–50	Malawi	Umpires: Michelle Phippard; Pauline Sciascia; Reserve umpire: Stacey Campton
Friday 24 March; 20:30 (UTC+11)	Report; Stats	Scoring by quarter: 16-8, 12-15, 17-11, 8-16			Umpires: Michelle Phippard; Pauline Sciascia; Reserve umpire: Stacey Campton
Friday 24 March; 20:30 (UTC+11)	Report; Stats	Monika Fuimaono 43/52 (83%); Malu Fa'asavalu 10/15 (67%)		Linda Magombo 44/50 (88%); Emma Mzagada 3/3 (100%); Peace Chawinga 3/10 (30%)	Umpires: Michelle Phippard; Pauline Sciascia; Reserve umpire: Stacey Campton

Squad

Samoa roster
Players
Coaches

Name	Pos	DOB	Height	Club	Nat	Caps
Malu Fa'asavalu	GA, GS	11 June 1984 (aged 21)	1.80 m (5 ft 11 in)	Baytex Panthers
Monika Fuimaono	GA, GS	2 May 1977 (aged 28)	1.93 m (6 ft 4 in)
Opheira Harder	WD	29 March 1976 (aged 29)	1.78 m (5 ft 10 in)
Aloma Inu	WA	6 September 1986 (aged 19)	1.75 m (5 ft 9 in)
Cathrine Latu	GS, GA	25 October 1986 (aged 19)	1.91 m (6 ft 3 in)	Northern Force
Akenehe Pereira	C, WA	21 July 1981 (aged 24)	1.68 m (5 ft 6 in)
Frances Solia (c)	C, WA	20 September 1976 (aged 29)	1.68 m (5 ft 6 in)	Canterbury Flames
Geradine Solia	GD	16 October 1983 (aged 22)	1.64 m (5 ft 5 in)	Capital Shakers
Lorna Suafoa (vc)	GK, GD	7 October 1975 (aged 30)	1.86 m (6 ft 1 in)	Northern Force
Monalisa Tofilau	GD, GK	4 June 1981 (aged 24)	1.83 m (6 ft 0 in)	St Mary's Old Girls Association
Ida Vaai	GA, GS	20 August 1986 (aged 19)	1.75 m (5 ft 9 in)	Black Cats
Brooke Williams	C, WA	23 December 1982 (aged 23)	1.73 m (5 ft 8 in)	Baytex Panthers

Head coach

- Linda Vagana

Notes

- (c) – Captain
- (cc) – Co-captain
- (vc) – Vice-captain
- – Injury / maternity leave
- (TRP) – Temporary Replacement Player
