= Western Samoa at the 1994 Commonwealth Games =

Samoa at the 1994 Commonwealth Games
- CGF code: SAM
- CGA: Samoa Association of Sports and National Olympic Committee
- Website: oceaniasport.com/samoa

in Victoria, British Columbia, Canada
- Medals: Gold 0 Silver 1 Bronze 0 Total 1

Commonwealth Games appearances (overview)
- 1974; 1978; 1982; 1986; 1990; 1994; 1998; 2002; 2006; 2010; 2014; 2018; 2022; 2026; 2030

Western Samoa at the 1994 Commonwealth Games was abbreviated SAM.

== Medals ==
	Gold	Silver	Bronze	Total
Western Samoa	0	1	0	1

=== Gold ===
- none

=== Silver ===
- Bob Gasio — Boxing, Men's Light Middleweight

=== Bronze ===
- none
