= Samoa at the 2010 Commonwealth Games =

- CGF code: SAM
- CGA: Samoa Association of Sports and National Olympic Committee
- Website: oceaniasport.com/samoa

in Delhi, India
- Flag bearers: Opening: Closing:
- Medals Ranked 14th: Gold 3 Silver 0 Bronze 1 Total 4

Commonwealth Games appearances (overview)
- 1974; 1978; 1982; 1986; 1990; 1994; 1998; 2002; 2006; 2010; 2014; 2018; 2022; 2026; 2030

Samoa competed at the 2010 Commonwealth Games in Delhi, India winning three gold medals and one bronze.

== Medalists ==
Medal	Name	Sport	Event	Date
Gold	Faavae Faauliuli	Weightlifting	Men's 94kg	October 9
Gold	Ele Opeloge	Weightlifting	Women's 75+ kg	October 10
Gold	Niusila Opeloge	Weightlifting	Men's 105kg	October 10
Bronze	Margaret Satupai	Athletics	Women's Shot Put	October 9

Among other sports, Samoa competed in rugby sevens. Samoa was the top seed in pool C, where it faced Kenya, Malaysia and Papua New Guinea.

== See also ==
- Samoa at the 2006 Commonwealth Games
