= Charlie Kane (boxer) =

British boxer

Personal information
- Born: 2 July 1968 (age 57) Glasgow, Scotland
- Height: 183 cm (6 ft 0 in)
- Weight: 62 kg (137 lb)

Sport
- Sport: Boxing
- Club: Antonine ABC
Medal record
Boxing
Representing Scotland
Commonwealth Games
Gold medal – first place	1990 Auckland	light-welterweight

Charles Kane (born 2 July 1968) is a British boxer. He fought as Charlie Kane and competed in the men's lightweight event at the 1988 Summer Olympics.

He won the 1988 Amateur Boxing Association British lightweight title, when boxing out of the Antonine ABC.

He competed for Scotland at the Commonwealth Games in 1986 in the featherweight event and in 1990, where he won a gold medal in the light-welterweight event.
