= Samoa at the 2014 Commonwealth Games =

- CG code: SAM
- CGA: Samoa Association of Sports and National Olympic Committee
- Website: oceaniasport.com/samoa

in Glasgow, Scotland
- Competitors: 41
- Flag bearer: Ele Opeloge
- Medals Ranked =24th: Gold 0 Silver 2 Bronze 1 Total 3

Commonwealth Games appearances (overview)
- 1974; 1978; 1982; 1986; 1990; 1994; 1998; 2002; 2006; 2010; 2014; 2018; 2022; 2026; 2030

Samoa competed in the 2014 Commonwealth Games in Glasgow, Scotland from 23 July – 3 August 2014. Participating in the Commonwealth Games for the eleventh time, Samoans have won sixteen medals (of which three gold) during their first ten participations. All three of those previous gold medals came in weightlifting at the 2010 Commonwealth Games, and two of the champions (Faavae Faauliuli and Ele Opeloge) are defending their titles in Glasgow.

== Medalists ==
Medal	Name	Sport	Event	Date
Silver	Mary Opeloge	Weightlifting	Women's 75 kg	July 29
Silver	Ele Opeloge	Weightlifting	Women's +75 kg	July 30
Bronze	Vaipava Ioane	Weightlifting	Men's 62 kg	July 25

== Athletics ==
Men

Athlete	Event	Round 1		Semifinal		Final	
Athlete	Event	Result	Rank	Result	Rank	Result	Rank
Eddie Hereme	100 m	10.92	7	did not advance			
Eddie Hereme	200 m	22.07	6	did not advance			
Siologa Viliamu Sepa	400 m	49.24	6	did not advance			
Siologa Viliamu Sepa	400 metres hurdles	did not start		—N/a		did not advance	

== Judo ==
Men

Athlete	Event	Round of 32	Round of 16	Quarterfinals	Semifinals	Repechage	Final / BM	
Athlete	Event	Opposition Result	Opposition Result	Opposition Result	Opposition Result	Opposition Result	Opposition Result	Rank
Derek Sua	+100 kg	—N/a	Shaw (WAL); L 1100-0004	did not advance				

== Rugby sevens ==
Samoa has qualified a rugby sevens team.

Pool C

Team	Pld	W	D	L	PF	PA	PD	Pts	Qualification
Samoa	3	3	0	0	106	26	+80	9	Medal competition
Wales	3	2	0	1	93	26	+67	7	Medal competition
Papua New Guinea	3	1	0	2	57	69	−12	5	Bowl competition
Malaysia	3	0	0	3	7	142	−135	3	Bowl competition

26 July 2014
11:38

Samoa	33–14	Papua New Guinea
	Report

Ibrox Stadium, Glasgow

26 July 2014
19:08

Samoa	54–0	Malaysia
	Report

Ibrox Stadium, Glasgow

26 July 2014
21:26

Samoa	19–12	Wales
	Report

Ibrox Stadium, Glasgow

== Shooting ==
Men
Shotgun

Athlete	Event	Qualification		Semifinals		Final/BM	
Athlete	Event	Points	Rank	Points	Rank	Points	Rank
Eddie Chan	Trap	95	27	did not advance			
Paul Loibl	Trap	86	31	did not advance			

== Swimming ==
Men

Athlete	Event	Heat		Semifinal		Final	
Athlete	Event	Time	Rank	Time	Rank	Time	Rank
Brandon Schuster
Brandon Schuster	50 m freestyle	25.53	45	did not advance			
Brandon Schuster	100 m freestyle	56.59	45	did not advance			
Brandon Schuster	200 m freestyle	2:03.13	30	—N/a		did not advance	
Brandon Schuster	400 m freestyle	4:23.73	26	—N/a		did not advance	
Brandon Schuster	200 m breaststroke	2:36.73	19	—N/a		did not advance	
Brandon Schuster	200 m individual medley	2:18.49	21	—N/a		did not advance	

Women

Athlete	Event	Heat		Semifinal		Final	
Athlete	Event	Time	Rank	Time	Rank	Time	Rank
Evelina Afoa	50 m freestyle	29.25	=48	did not advance			
Evelina Afoa	50 m butterfly	31.23	39	did not advance			
Evelina Afoa	50 m backstroke	32.28	21	did not advance			
Evelina Afoa	100 m backstroke	1:09.13	23	did not advance			

== Weightlifting ==
Men

Athlete	Event	Snatch	Clean & Jerk	Total	Rank
Vaipava Ioane	62 kg	115	156	271	3rd place, bronze medalist(s)
Toafitu Perive	77 kg	did not finish			
Siaosi Leuo	85 kg	132	171	303	7
Petunu Opeloge	85 kg	140	172	312	6
Sanele Mao	94 kg	135	170	305	9
Faavae Faauliuli	105 kg	125	181	306	8
Tovia Opeloge	105 kg	146	185	331	4
Lauititi Lui	+105 kg	140	181	321	8

Women

Athlete	Event	Snatch	Clean & Jerk	Total	Rank
Vanessa Lui	69 kg	80	105	185	9
Mary Opeloge	75 kg	109	134	243	2nd place, silver medalist(s)
Ele Opeloge	+75 kg	120	151	271	2nd place, silver medalist(s)
Iuniarra Sipaia	+75 kg	102	131	233	5
