= Jamie Nicolson =

Australian boxer (1971–1994)

Personal information
- Nationality: Australian
- Born: James Neil Nicolson; 9 November 1971 United Kingdom
- Died: 28 February 1994 (aged 22) Helensvale, Queensland, Australia
- Height: 1.73 m (5 ft 8 in)
- Weight: Featherweight; Super featherweight

Boxing career
- Stance: Southpaw

Boxing record
- Total fights: 8
- Wins: 7
- Win by KO: 3
- Losses: 1
Medal record
Men's amateur boxing
Representing Australia
Commonwealth Games
Bronze medal – third place	Auckland 1990	Featherweight
World Championships
Bronze medal – third place	Moscow 1989	Featherweight

James Neil Nicolson (9 November 1971 – 28 February 1994) was an Australian boxer. He won a bronze medal at the 1989 World Amateur Boxing Championships in Moscow and a bronze medal at the 1990 Commonwealth Games in Auckland, before competing at the 1992 Summer Olympics in Barcelona. Nicolson turned professional later in 1992, and held a record of 7–1 prior to his death.

From Yatala, Queensland, Nicolson was born to a Scottish-born father, Allan, originally from Glasgow. His sister Skye, who was born the year after her brothers' deaths, was a bronze medallist at the 2016 World Amateur Championships and a gold medallist at the 2018 Commonwealth Games.

== Death ==
On 28 February 1994, Nicolson was killed, along with his 10-year-old brother Gavin, in a traffic collision on the Pacific Highway in Helensvale, Gold Coast. The pair were headed to training in Nerang. Nicolson was 22.

Jamie Nicolson Avenue and Jamie Nicolson Park in Edens Landing are named in honour of him.
