= Zoramthanga (boxer) =

First Indian boxer to win an international medal (1963 – 2005)

Personal information
- Nationality: Indian
- Born: Run Nawn Thang; 1963 Selawn, Falam, Chin State, Burma
- Died: 9 February 2005 Aizawl, Mizoram, India

Sport
- Sport: Amateur boxing
Medal record
Representing India
Boxing World Cup
Bronze medal – third place	1990 Bombay	Light flyweight

Zoramthanga (also known as Zoram Thanga or T. Zoramthanga, born as Run Nawn Thang, 1963 – 9 February 2005) was an Indian amateur boxer. He is remembered as the first Indian boxer to win a bronze medal at the Boxing World Cup.

== Early life ==
Zoramthanga was born Run Nawn to a Chin family in Selawn village near the town of Falam in Chin State, Myanmar. His family moved to Tithim village near Tahan-Kalaymyo. There he joined the Myanmar Army and took up boxing.

== Career ==
He began his career in 1985 and won a gold medal at the Mizoram-Myanmar Border Champhai Meet. He participated in several national and international boxing championships for Mizoram and India.

He participated at the World Amateur Boxing Championships in Moscow in 1989, where he reached the quarter finals, before losing to Rogelio Marcelo.

As a flyweight, he represented India at the 1990 Commonwealth Games in Auckland. In his first bout, he defeated Pupuke Robati of the Cook Islands before losing his second fight to Nokuthula Tshabangu of Zimbabwe.

His greatest success came at the 6th Boxing World Cup in Mumbai in 1990, where he won a bronze medal in the light flyweight category. He defeated Jin Yang of South Korea on points in the preliminaries, and Paul Weir of Scotland in the quarterfinals, also on points. He lost to eventual champion Eric Griffin of United States in the semi-finals on points. However, unlike most amateur boxing tournaments, the Boxing World Cup had a third place play-off to decide the bronze medal position. Zoramthanga defeated fellow Indian boxer Dhamendar Yadav 17–4 on points to clinch the bronze medal.
