= Samoa at the 2026 Commonwealth Games =

- Flag of Samoa
- CG code: SAM
- CGA: Samoa Association of Sports and National Olympic Committee
- Website: sasnoc.com

in Glasgow, Scotland 23 July 2026 – 2 August 2026
- Competitors: 21 in 5 sports
- Flag bearer (opening): Sanele Mao
- Baton bearer: Iuniarra Sipaia
- Flag bearer (closing): Alex Rose
- Medals Ranked =17th: Gold 1 Silver 1 Bronze 0 Total 2

Commonwealth Games appearances (overview)
- 1974; 1978; 1982; 1986; 1990; 1994; 1998; 2002; 2006; 2010; 2014; 2018; 2022; 2026; 2030

Samoa competed at the 2026 Commonwealth Games in Glasgow, Scotland. This marked Samoa's 14th participation at the games, after making its debut at the 1974 Commonwealth Games.

The King's Baton relay stopped in Samoa in January 2026.

The Samoan team consisted of 21 athletes competing in five sports. Weightlifters Sanele Mao and Iuniarra Sipaia were the country's opening ceremony flagbearer and bato bearers respectively. Discus thrower Alex Rose served as the country's closing ceremony flagbearer.

Samoa won two medals, a gold and silver, both in the sport of weightlifting.

== Competitors ==
The following is the list of number of competitors participating at the Games per sport/discipline.

Sport	Men	Women	Total
Athletics	1	2	3
Boxing	3	1	4
Judo	1	0	1
Swimming	2	2	4
Weightlifting	5	4	9
Total	12	9	21

== Medalists ==
The following Samoan competitors won medals at the games. In the by discipline sections below, medallists' names are bolded.

Medal	Name	Sport	Event	Date	Ref.
Gold	Seine Stowers	Weightlifting	Women's 77 kg	29 July	
Silver	John Tafi	Weightlifting	Men's 71 kg	27 July	

== Athletics ==
Samoa entered three track and field athletes (one man and two women).

Track

Athlete	Event	Heat		Semifinal		Final	
Athlete	Event	Result	Rank	Result	Rank	Result	Rank
Symone Tafuna'i	Women's 100 metres	12.03	4	Did not advance			

Field

Athlete	Event	Final	
Athlete	Event	Distance	Rank
Alex Rose	Men's discus throw	63.32	4
Nuuausala Tuilefano	Women's shot put	14.45	11

== Boxing ==
Samoa entered four boxers, three men and one woman. Danielle Holland became the first women's boxer to represent Samoa at the Commonwealth Games.

Athlete	Event	Round of 32	Round of 16	Quarterfinals	Semifinals	Final	
Athlete	Event	Opposition Result	Opposition Result	Opposition Result	Opposition Result	Opposition Result	Rank
Marion Faustino Ah Tong	Men's 80 kg	Bye	Kaoma (KIR); **W** RSC	Kerr (SCO); **L** 0–5	Did not advance		
Dee Ioapo	Men's 80 kg	Pitt (WAL); **L** 0–5	Did not advance				
Michael Seko	Men's +90 kg	—N/a		Berwal (IND); **L** 2–3	Did not advance		
Danielle Holland	Women's 54 kg	Bye	Gabriel (MRI); **L** 0–5	Did not advance			

== Judo ==
Samoa entered one male judoka.

Men

Athlete	Event	Round of 16	Quarterfinals	Semifinals	Repechage	Final/BM	
Athlete	Event	Opposition Result	Opposition Result	Opposition Result	Opposition Result	Opposition Result	Rank
Peniamina Percival	81 kg	Stevens (GIB); **W** 003s2–000	Meuwsen (RSA); **L** 000–100	Did not advance	Tokas (IND); **L** 000–101	Did not advance	7

== Swimming ==
Samoa entered four swimmers, two of each gender.

Athlete	Event	Heat		Semifinal		Final	
Athlete	Event	Time	Rank	Time	Rank	Time	Rank
Johann Stickland	Men's 50 m freestyle	23.86	30	Did not advance			
Johann Stickland	Men's 100 m freestyle	52.46	38	Did not advance			
Johann Stickland	Men's 50 m butterfly	24.91	25	Did not advance			
Christian Toia	Men's 50 m breaststroke	29.25	32	Did not advance			
Christian Toia	Men's 100 m breaststroke	1:06.68	32	Did not advance			
Christian Toia	Men's 200 m breaststroke	2:24.01	12	—N/a		Did not advance	
Christian Toia	Men's 200 m individual medley	2:16.08	20	—N/a		Did not advance	
Paige Schendelaar-Kemp	Women's 50 m freestyle	27.06	30	Did not advance			
Paige Schendelaar-Kemp	Women's 50 m butterfly	28.08	23	Did not advance			
Paige Schendelaar-Kemp	Women's 100 m butterfly	1:04.94	22	Did not advance			
Nafanua Hamilton	Women's 100 m freestyle	58.53	31	Did not advance			
Nafanua Hamilton	Women's 200 m freestyle	2:08.34	24	—N/a		Did not advance	
Nafanua Hamilton	Women's 50 m backstroke	30.41	22	Did not advance			
Nafanua Hamilton	Women's 100 m backstroke	1:05.57	24	Did not advance			
Nafanua Hamilton	Women's 200 m backstroke	2:24.14	15	—N/a		Did not advance	
Nafanua Hamilton	Women's 200 m individual medley	2:25.37	14	—N/a		Did not advance	
Christian Toia; Johann Stickland; Nafanua Hamilton; Paige Schendelaar-Kemp	Mixed 4 × 100 m freestyle relay	3:45.13 **NR**	11	—N/a		Did not advance	
Christian Toia; Johann Stickland; Nafanua Hamilton; Paige Schendelaar-Kemp	Mixed 4 × 100 m medley relay	4:07.31	11	—N/a		Did not advance	

== Weightlifting ==
Samoa qualified nine weightlifters (five men and four women).

Men

Athlete	Event	Snatch (kg)		Clean & Jerk (kg)		Total (kg)	Rank
Athlete	Event	Result	Rank	Result	Rank	Total (kg)	Rank
Falevaa Tafi	65 kg	108	7	130	7	238	7
**John Tafi**	71 kg	142	2	172 **GR**	2	314	2nd place, silver medalist(s)
Emmanuel Ulimasao	94 kg	144	7	180	6	324	6
Jack Opeloge	110 kg	159	4	NM		DNF	
Sanele Mao	+110 kg	NM		DNF			

Women

Athlete	Event	Snatch (kg)		Clean & Jerk (kg)		Total (kg)	Rank
Athlete	Event	Result	Rank	Result	Rank	Total (kg)	Rank
Anoni Taulua	58 kg	82	7	95	8	177	8
**Seine Stowers**	77 kg	107 **GR**	1	130	2	237 **GR**	1st place, gold medalist(s)
Sefulu Seuao	86 kg	96	7	123	5	219	6
Iuniarra Sipaia	+86 kg	100	6	NM		DNF	
