= Samoa at the 2002 Commonwealth Games =

- CG code: SAM
- CGA: Samoa Association of Sports and National Olympic Committee
- Website: oceaniasport.com/samoa

in Manchester, England
- Competitors: 37
- Flag bearers: Opening: Closing:
- Medals Ranked 31st: Gold 0 Silver 1 Bronze 2 Total 3

Commonwealth Games appearances (overview)
- 1974; 1978; 1982; 1986; 1990; 1994; 1998; 2002; 2006; 2010; 2014; 2018; 2022; 2026; 2030

Samoa competed at the Commonwealth Games in Manchester. It sent 34 male and three female competitors. athletics, boxing, lawn bowls, rugby sevens, shooting, weightlifting and wrestling. It won two silvers and a bronze, all in weightlifting, the nations best performance at the games.

== Medals ==
	Gold	Silver	Bronze	Total
Samoa	0	1	2	3

== Medalists ==
=== Silver ===
Weightlifting:

(silver) Ofisa Ofisa, Men's 85kg Clean and Jerk.

=== Bronze ===
Weightlifting:

(bronze) Ofisa Ofisa, Men's 85kg Combined.
(bronze) Niusila Opeloge Men's 85kg Snatch
