= Tanzania at the 2018 Commonwealth Games =

- Flag of Tanzania
- CGF code: TAN
- CGA: Tanzania Olympic Committee
- Website: noctanzania.org

in Gold Coast, Australia 4 April 2018 – 15 April 2018
- Competitors: 15 in 4 sports
- Flag bearer: Masoud Mtalaso (opening)
- Medals: Gold 0 Silver 0 Bronze 0 Total 0

Commonwealth Games appearances (overview)
- 1962; 1966; 1970; 1974; 1978; 1982; 1986; 1990; 1994; 1998; 2002; 2006; 2010; 2014; 2018; 2022; 2026; 2030

Tanzania competed at the 2018 Commonwealth Games in the Gold Coast, Australia from April 4 to April 15, 2018.

Table tennis athlete Masoud Mtalaso was the country's flag bearer during the opening ceremony.

== Competitors ==
The following is the list of number of competitors participating at the Games per sport/discipline.

Sport	Men	Women	Total
Athletics	4	2	6
Boxing	4	0	4
Swimming	1	0	1
Table tennis	2	2	4
Total	11	4	15

== Athletics ==
Men
Track & road events

Athlete	Event	Heat		Semifinal		Final	
Athlete	Event	Result	Rank	Result	Rank	Result	Rank
Ali Khamis Gulam	100 m	10.76	4	did not advance			
Ali Khamis Gulam	200 m	21.43	5	did not advance			
Stephano Huche Gwandu	Marathon	—				2:33:03	14
Saidi Juma Makula	Marathon	—				Did not finish	

Field events

Athlete	Event	Qualification		Final	
Athlete	Event	Distance	Rank	Distance	Rank
Anthony Mwanga	Long jump	7.20	22	did not advance	
Anthony Mwanga	Triple jump	14.22	19	did not advance	

Women
Track & road events

Athlete	Event	Final	
Athlete	Event	Result	Rank
Failuna Matanga	5000 m	16:07.99	15
Failuna Matanga	10000 m	32:22.09	12
Sara Ramadhani Makera	Marathon	2:46:52	9

== Boxing ==
Tanzania participated with a team of 4 athletes (4 men).

Men

Athlete	Event	Round of 32	Round of 16	Quarterfinals	Semifinals	Final	Rank
Athlete	Event	Opposition Result	Opposition Result	Opposition Result	Opposition Result	Opposition Result	Rank
Ezra Mwanjwango	−56 kg	—	Everisto Mulenga (ZAM); L 0-5	did not advance			
Kassim Mbundwike	−69 kg	BYE	Manoj Kumar (IND); L 0-5	did not advance			
Selemani Kidunda	−75 kg	Edwin Owuor (KEN); L 2-3	did not advance				
Haruna Mhando	−91 kg	—	Naman Tanwar (IND); L 0-5	did not advance			

== Swimming ==
Tanzania participated with 2 athletes (1 man and 1 woman).

Athlete	Event	Heat		Semifinal		Final	
Athlete	Event	Time	Rank	Time	Rank	Time	Rank
Hilal Hilal	Men's 50 m freestyle	24.37	37	did not advance			
Hilal Hilal	Men's 50 m butterfly	26.32	35	did not advance			

== Table tennis ==
Tanzania participated with 4 athletes (2 men and 2 women).

Singles

Athletes	Event	Group Stage			Round of 64	Round of 32	Round of 16	Quarterfinal	Semifinal	Final	Rank
Athletes	Event	Opposition Score	Opposition Score	Rank	Opposition Score	Opposition Score	Opposition Score	Opposition Score	Opposition Score	Opposition Score	Rank
Masoud Mtalaso	Men's singles	Bernadet (CAN); L 1 - 4	Britton (GUY); L 0 - 4	3	did not advance						
Amoni Tumaini	Men's singles	Vaea (TUV); W 4 - 0	Wu (FIJ); W 4 - 2	1 Q	Bye	Pang (SGP); L 0 - 4	did not advance				
Neema Mwaisyula	Women's singles	Ho (MAS); L 0 - 4	Cummings (GUY); L 2 - 4	3	—	did not advance					
Fathiya Pazi	Women's singles	Katepu (TUV); W 4 - 0	Tommy (VAN); L 0 - 4	2	—	did not advance					

Doubles

Athletes	Event	Round of 64	Round of 32	Round of 16	Quarterfinal	Semifinal	Final	Rank
Athletes	Event	Opposition Score	Opposition Score	Opposition Score	Opposition Score	Opposition Score	Opposition Score	Rank
Masoud Mtalaso; Amoni Tumaini	Men's doubles	Bye	Jayasingha Mudiyanselage / Ranasingha (SRI); L 1 - 3	did not advance				
Neema Mwaisyula; Fathiya Pazi	Women's doubles	—	Lulu / Tommy (VAN); L 0 - 3	did not advance				
Neema Mwaisyula; Amoni Tumaini	Mixed doubles	Shing / Lulu (VAN); L 1 - 3	did not advance					
Fathiya Pazi; Masoud Mtalaso	Mixed doubles	Sirisena / Madurangi (SRI); L 1 - 3	did not advance					

== See also ==
- Tanzania at the 2018 Summer Youth Olympics
