= Mark Edwards (boxer) =

British boxer (born 1963)

Personal information
- Nationality: British
- Born: 15 September 1963 (age 62) London, England

Sport
- Sport: Boxing
Medal record
Boxing
Representing England
Commonwealth Games
Bronze medal – third place	1990 Auckland	middleweight

Mark Edwards (born 15 September 1963) is a retired British boxer.

== Boxing career ==
He competed in the men's middleweight event at the 1992 Summer Olympics.

He represented England and won a bronze medal in the -75 kg middleweight division, at the 1990 Commonwealth Games in Auckland, New Zealand.

Boxing for the Royal Navy, he was twice winner of the prestigious ABA middleweight championship (1988 and 1991).
