= Royal Easter Show =

Royal Easter Show may refer to:

- Sydney Royal Easter Show
- Auckland Royal Easter Show
