= Dharmendra Singh Yadav =

Indian boxer (born 1972)

Personal information
- Nickname: gogi
- Nationality: Indian
- Born: Dharmendra Singh Yadav; 29 December 1972 (age 53) Delhi, India
- Height: 5 ft 4 in (163 cm)
- Weight: Super bantamweight

Boxing career

Boxing record
- Total fights: 6
- Wins: 6
- Win by KO: 1
- Losses: 0
Medal record
Men's amateur boxing
Representing India
Event	1st	2nd	3rd
Olympic Games	-	-	-
Commonwealth Games	-	-	1
Asian Championships	-	2	1
Total	0	2	2
Asian Championships
Bronze medal – third place	1989Bangkok	Superbantamweight
Asian Championship
Silver medal – second place	1991 Bangkok	Superbantamweight
Silver medal – second place	1993 China	Superbantamweight

Dharmendra Singh Yadav (born 29 December 1972) is an Indian boxer who won a bronze medal in 1990 Asian Championship. He received the Arjuna Award for boxing in 1991. He also received the Dronacharya Award for lifetime contributions in 2025.

Yadav represented India 19 times in international events from 1989 to 1994. He won three silver and seven bronze medals. He won a bronze medal at the 1990 Commonwealth Games (light flyweight division). He turned professional in 1995, the first Indian boxer to do so.

Yadav competed in the flyweight division at the 1992 Summer Olympics. He was defeated in the first round by Hungary's István Kovács. He finished in 17th place. Yadav Is an ACP In Delhi Police.

Yadav is India's first professional boxer with an unbeaten record of 6 wins together.

== Professional boxing record ==
6 Wins (1 knockouts), 0 Losses, 0 Draws,
Res.	Record	Opponent	Type	Rd.	Date	Location	Notes
Win	6-0	(United Kingdom) Neil Parry	PTS	6	1996-09-03	York Hall, London, United Kingdom	
Win	5-0	(Bulgaria) Krasimir Cholakov	TKO	1	1996-07-09	York Hall, London, United Kingdom	
Win	4-0	(United Kingdom) Anthony Hanna	PTS	4	1996-05-14	Goresbrook Leisure Centre, Essex, United Kingdom	
Win	3-0	(United Kingdom) Brendan Bryce	PTS	4	1996-04-02	Elephant & Castle Centre, London, United Kingdom	
Win	2-0	(United Kingdom) Rowan Anthony Williams	PTS	4	1996-01-19	Leisure Centre, Berkshire, United Kingdom	
Win	1-0	(United Kingdom) Shaun Norman	PTS	4	1995-11-29	Elephant & Castle Centre, London, United Kingdom	Professional boxing debut.

== See also ==
- Boxing at the 1992 Summer Olympics
- Boxing at the 1990 Commonwealth Games
