= Boxing at the 2018 Commonwealth Games – Men's heavyweight =

Boxing competitions

Boxing – Men's heavyweight at the 2018 Commonwealth Games
- Venue: Oxenford Studios
- Dates: 6 – 14 April 2018
- Competitors: 11 from 11 nations

Medalists
gold medal	David Nyika	New Zealand
silver medal	Jason Whateley	Australia
bronze medal	Naman Tanwar	India
bronze medal	Cheavon Clarke	England

The men's heavyweight boxing competitions at the 2018 Commonwealth Games in Gold Coast, Australia took place between 6 and 14 April at Oxenford Studios. Heavyweights were limited to those boxers weighing less than 91 kilograms.

Like all Commonwealth boxing events, the competition was a straight single-elimination tournament. Both semifinal losers were awarded bronze medals, so no boxers competed again after their first loss. Bouts consisted of three rounds of three minutes each, with one-minute breaks between rounds. Beginning this year, the competition was scored using the "must-ten" scoring system.

== Schedule ==
The schedule is as follows:

All times are Australian Eastern Standard Time (UTC+10)

Date	Time	Round
Friday 6 April 2018	13:32	Round of 16
Tuesday 10 April 2018	15:02	Quarter-finals
Friday 13 April 2018	15:02	Semi-finals
Saturday 14 April 2018	13:32	Final

== Results ==
The draw is as follows:

Round of 16
Naman Tanwar (IND)	5
Haruna Mhando (TAN)	0
David Nyika (NZL)	5
Yakita Aska (ANT)	0
Scott Forrest (SCO)	5
Elly Ochola (KEN)	0

Quarterfinals
Frank Masoe (SAM)	0
Naman Tanwar (IND)	5
Damien Sullivan (NIR)	1
Jason Whateley (AUS)	4
Christian Ndzie Tsoye (CMR)
David Nyika (NZL)	W/O
Scott Forrest (SCO)	0
Cheavon Clarke (ENG)	4

Semifinals
Naman Tanwar (IND)	0
Jason Whateley (AUS)	4
David Nyika (NZL)	5
Cheavon Clarke (ENG)	0

Final
Jason Whateley (AUS)	0
David Nyika (NZL)	5
