= Haji Ally =

Tanzanian boxer (born 1968)

Personal information
- Full name: Haji Ally Matumla
- Nationality: Tanzania
- Born: May 25, 1968 (age 58)
- Height: 1.65 m (5 ft 5 in)
- Weight: 54 kg (119 lb)

Sport
- Sport: Boxing
- Weight class: Bantamweight

Haji Ally Matumla (born May 25, 1968) is a retired male boxer from Tanzania, who represented his native East African country as a bantamweight at the 1988 Summer Olympics in Seoul, South Korea. He also competed at the 1990 Commonwealth Games, winning a silver medal in the men's featherweight division. In the final he lost to England's John Irwin.
