= Tanzania at the 2014 Commonwealth Games =

- CG code: TAN
- CGA: Tanzania Olympic Committee
- Website: noctanzania.org

in Glasgow, Scotland
- Flag bearer: Seleman Salum Kidunda
- Medals: Gold 0 Silver 0 Bronze 0 Total 0

Commonwealth Games appearances (overview)
- 1962; 1966; 1970; 1974; 1978; 1982; 1986; 1990; 1994; 1998; 2002; 2006; 2010; 2014; 2018; 2022; 2026; 2030

Tanzania competed in the 2014 Commonwealth Games in Glasgow, Scotland from 23 July – 3 August 2014.

== Athletics ==
Men
Track & road events

Athlete	Event	Heat		Semifinal		Final	
Athlete	Event	Result	Rank	Result	Rank	Result	Rank
Imani James Rusanganya	400 m	50.87	8	—N/a		did not advance	
John Bazili Baynit	1500 m	3:40.93	5 q	—N/a		3:41.74	8
Dotto Ramadhani Ikangaa	1500 m	3:46.29 PB	10	—N/a		did not advance	
Fabiano Nelson Sulle	5000 m	—N/a				13:44.65	14
Wilbaldo Peter Malley	5000 m	—N/a				14:10.92	18
Wilbaldo Peter Malley	10,000 m	—N/a				28:51.94	17
Fabiano Joseph Naasi	Marathon	—N/a				2:15:21	11
John Leonard Karori	Marathon	—N/a				DNF	

Key

- Note–Ranks given for track events are within the athlete's heat only
- Q = Qualified for the next round
- q = Qualified for the next round as a fastest loser or, in field events, by position without achieving the qualifying target
- NR = National record
- N/A = Round not applicable for the event

== Judo ==
Men

Athlete	Event	Round of 32	Round of 16	Quarterfinals	Semifinals	Repechage	Final / BM	
Athlete	Event	Opposition Result	Opposition Result	Opposition Result	Opposition Result	Opposition Result	Opposition Result	Rank
Ahmedi Magogo	−60 kg	—N/a	Le Grange (RSA); L w/o	did not advance				
Abubakari Nzige	−60 kg	Fikri (MAS); L 0000-1010	did not advance					
Andrew Thomas Mlugu	−60 kg	Bye	Punza (ZAM); L 0003-0001	did not advance				
Mbarouk Mbarouk	−73 kg	Bye	Leat (NZL); L 0002-1000	did not advance				
Gervas Chilipweli	−73 kg	Jeanne (SEY); L 0004-0002	did not advance					
Geophrey Mtawa	−90 kg	—N/a	Wickramage (SRI); L 0003-0113	did not advance				
Massoud Kombo	−100 kg	—N/a	Rancev (WAL); L 0001-1000	did not advance				

== Swimming ==
Men

Athlete	Event	Heat		Semifinal		Final	
Athlete	Event	Time	Rank	Time	Rank	Time	Rank
Hilal Hemed Hilal	50 m freestyle	25.24	42	did not advance			
Ammaar Ghadiyali	100 m freestyle	57.50	48	did not advance			
Ammaar Ghadiyali	200 m freestyle	2:08.94	33	—N/a		did not advance	
Hilal Hemed Hilal	50 m backstroke	30.11	28	did not advance			
Ammaar Ghadiyali	50 m butterfly	28.11	40	did not advance			
Hilal Hemed Hilal	50 m butterfly	27.28	34	did not advance			
Ammaar Ghadiyali	100 m butterfly	1:06.21	35	did not advance			

Women

Athlete	Event	Heat		Semifinal		Final	
Athlete	Event	Time	Rank	Time	Rank	Time	Rank
Mariam Foum	50 m freestyle	29.16	=46	did not advance			
Magdalena Moshi	50 m freestyle	29.97	55	did not advance			
Magdalena Moshi	100 m freestyle	1:07.58	45	did not advance			
Mariam Foum	50 m breaststroke	37.61	33	did not advance			

== Weightlifting ==
Men

Athlete	Event	Snatch	Clean & Jerk	Total	Rank
Abdullah Adballah	56 kg	72	85	157	11
Abdul Simai	77 kg	did not finish			
