= Tanzania at the 2006 Commonwealth Games =

- CGF code: TAN
- CGA: Tanzania Olympic Committee
- Website: noctanzania.org

in Melbourne, Australia
- Flag bearers: Opening: Closing:
- Medals Ranked =19thth: Gold 1 Silver 0 Bronze 1 Total 2

Commonwealth Games appearances (overview)
- 1962; 1966; 1970; 1974; 1978; 1982; 1986; 1990; 1994; 1998; 2002; 2006; 2010; 2014; 2018; 2022; 2026; 2030

Tanzania is represented at the 2006 Commonwealth Games in Melbourne by a xx-member strong contingent comprising xx sportspersons and xx officials. The squad ended up in 19th place in the overall medal count, with one gold and one bronze.

== Medals ==
=== Gold ===
- Samson Ramadhani — Athletics, Men's Marathon

=== Bronze ===
- Fabiano Joseph Naasi — Athletics, Men's 10,000 metres

== See also ==
- Tanzania at the 2004 Summer Olympics
- Tanzania at the 2008 Summer Olympics
