= Marian Fountain =

New Zealand artist

- Born: 1960 (age 65–66); New Zealand
- Style: Sculpture and medal art

Marian Fountain (born 1960) is a New Zealand medal maker and sculptor. Her works are held in the British Museum, Smithsonian Museum and University of Auckland art collections.

== Biography ==
Fountain was born in New Zealand in 1960. She was introduced to the techniques of bronze casting while studying at Elam School of Fine Arts from 1979 to 1983, where she worked under the guidance of Paul Beadle. In 1984 she received a travel grant from the Queen Elizabeth II Arts Council and travelled to London, where she gained experience casting at the Royal College of Art. Fountain then moved to Italy where she studied at the Scuola della Medaglia (Rome Mint).

Fountain has designed and made medals for the 1990 XIV Commonwealth Games, the 2003 America’s Cup, the 100th anniversary of the Entente Cordiale in 2004, and the Humanities medal to be awarded annually by the Royal Society of New Zealand, commissioned in 2011. She also completed a series of 34 bas-reliefs for the Royal Infirmary of Edinburgh Hospital.

While living in Italy, a friend of Fountain's who was based in Paris invited her to move into a building scheduled for demolition. Fountain lived in this "shack" for 8 years, and described washing outside in a bucket "like a painting of Degas".

== Education ==
Bachelor of Fine Arts (Sculpture and Design), Elam School of Fine Arts, University of Auckland (1979-1983)

Scuola della Medaglia, Rome Mint (1985-1986)

== Residencies and awards ==
Queen Elizabeth II Arts Council Major Travel Grant, 1984.

Residency at National Gallery of Modern Art, Edinburgh, 1990.

Prix de Sculpture, first prize, French Mint, 1990.

Lipworth Foundation Sculpture Prize, 1993.

Residency at Ville de Paris, 2007.

== Exhibitions and notable works ==
Fountain has exhibited at the British Museum, The National Gallery of Scotland, the Museo Archeologico of Milan, York Museum, Auckland Museum and the French Mint.

In April 2017, her 3.5m high bronze monument, The Earth Remembers was commissioned to mark the First World War centenary commemorations at the Carrière Wellington Museum in Arras, France. It honours the 500 members of the New Zealand Tunnelling Company of Arras.

Regroup Reflect Regenerate, the 25^{th} anniversary retrospective show by the Medal Artists of New Zealand, Pah Homestead, 2015.
