= Simon Robert Naali =

Tanzanian marathon runner

Simon Robert Naali (March 9, 1966 – August 13, 1994) was a Tanzanian police officer and marathon runner.

Naali finished eleventh at the 1993 World Championships in 2:19:30 hours. He won the bronze medal at the 1990 Commonwealth Games. He competed at the 1992 Summer Olympics, but did not finish the race.

Naali tragically died in 1994, aged 28 in Moshi, Kilimanjaro, while recovering from injuries suffered in a hit-and-run accident with a taxi while on a training run in Tanzania.

== Achievements ==
Year	Competition	Venue	Position	Event	Notes
Representing Tanzania
1989	Honolulu Marathon	Honolulu, United States	1st	Marathon	2:11:47
1990	Commonwealth Games	Auckland, New Zealand	3rd	Marathon	2:10:38
1990	Stockholm Marathon	Stockholm, Sweden	1st	Marathon	2:13:04
1990	Honolulu Marathon	Honolulu, United States	1st	Marathon	2:17:29
1992	Olympic Games	Barcelona, Spain	—	Marathon	DNF
1993	World Championships	Stuttgart, Germany	11th	Marathon	2:19:30
