= Tanzania at the Commonwealth Games =

- CG code: TAN
- CGA: Tanzania Olympic Committee
- Website: tanzaniaolympics.org
- Medals Ranked 25th: Gold 6 Silver 7 Bronze 11 Total 24

Commonwealth Games appearances (overview)
- 1962; 1966; 1970; 1974; 1978; 1982; 1986; 1990; 1994; 1998; 2002; 2006; 2010; 2014; 2018; 2022; 2026; 2030

Tanzania has competed in thirteen of the fourteen Commonwealth Games since 1966, following the formation of the country in 1964, missing only the 1986 Commonwealth Games. One of its predecessor states, Tanganyika, competed in the 1962 British Empire and Commonwealth Games.

== Overall medal tally ==
Games	Gold	Silver	Bronze	Total
1966 Kingston	0	0	0	0
1970 Edinburgh	0	1	0	1
1974 Christchurch	1	0	1	2
1978 Edmonton	1	1	0	2
1982 Brisbane	1	2	2	5
1990 Auckland	0	1	2	3
1994 Victoria	0	0	1	1
1998 Kuala Lumpur	1	1	1	3
2002 Manchester	1	0	1	2
2006 Melbourne	1	0	1	2
2010 Delhi	0	0	0	0
2014 Glasgow	0	0	0	0
2018 Gold Coast	0	0	0	0
2022 Birmingham	0	1	2	3
2026 Glasgow	0	0	0	0
Totals (15 entries)	6	7	11	24

== History ==
At the 2006 Commonwealth Games, Tanzania was nineteenth in the medal tally with two medals, and was twenty-fourth in the All-time tally of medals, with an overall total of 21 medals.
