= Domenic Figliomeni =

Canadian boxer (born 1969)

Personal information
- Born: March 17, 1969 (age 57) Terrace Bay, Ontario, Canada

Sport
- Sport: Boxing
Medal record
Men's amateur boxing
Representing Canada
Commonwealth Games
Bronze medal – third place	1990 Auckland	Light flyweight
Bronze medal – third place	1994 Victoria	Light flyweight

Domenic Filane Figliomeni (born March 17, 1969, in Terrace Bay, Ontario) is a former boxer from Canada, who competed for his native country at two consecutive Summer Olympics, starting in 1992.

Nicknamed "Hollywood", he was Canadian Boxing Champion from 1990 to 1999 in the Light Flyweight Division (48 kg), and twice won the bronze medal at the Commonwealth Games: in 1990 and 1994. After his boxing career he started a boxing training center in Schreiber, Ontario.
