= Tanzania at the 2022 Commonwealth Games =

- Flag of Tanzania
- CG code: TAN
- CGA: Tanzania Olympic Committee
- Website: tanzaniaolympics.org

in Birmingham, England 28 July 2022 – 8 August 2022
- Competitors: 17 (13 men and 4 women) in 5 sports
- Medals Ranked 32nd: Gold 0 Silver 1 Bronze 2 Total 3

Commonwealth Games appearances (overview)
- 1962; 1966; 1970; 1974; 1978; 1982; 1986; 1990; 1994; 1998; 2002; 2006; 2010; 2014; 2018; 2022; 2026; 2030

Tanzania competed at the 2022 Commonwealth Games in Birmingham, England between 28 July and 8 August 2022. It was Tanzania's fourteenth appearance at the Games.

== Medalists ==
Medal	Name	Sport	Event	Date
Silver	Alphonce Simbu	Athletics	Men's marathon	30 July
Bronze	Kassim Mbundwike	Boxing	Men's light middleweight	6 August
Bronze	Yusuf Changalawe	Boxing	Men's light heavyweight	6 August

== Competitors ==
It is expected that Tanzania will send a contingent of 17 competitors to the Games.

The following is the list of number of competitors participating at the Games per sport/discipline.

Sport	Men	Women	Total
Athletics	6	3	9
Boxing	3	0	3
Judo	2	0	2
Para powerlifting	1	0	1
Swimming	1	1	2
Total	13	4	17

== Athletics ==
Men
Track and road events

Athlete	Event	Heat		Final	
Athlete	Event	Result	Rank	Result	Rank
Andrew Rhobi	1500 m	4:07.85	11	did not advance	
Faraja Damasi	5000 m	—N/a		13:59.16	15
Josephat Gisemo	5000 m	—N/a		14:05.82	16
Joseph Panga	10,000 m	—N/a		28:13.87	8
Hamisi Misai	Marathon	—N/a		2:15:59	8
Alphonce Simbu	Marathon	—N/a		2:12:29	2nd place, silver medalist(s)

Women
Track and road events

Athlete	Event	Heat		Semifinal		Final	
Athlete	Event	Result	Rank	Result	Rank	Result	Rank
Winifrida Makenji	100 m	DSQ		did not advance			
Winifrida Makenji	200 m	24.74	26	did not advance			
Failuna Matanga	Marathon	—N/a				2:31:29	6
Jackline Sakilu	Marathon	—N/a				3:02:33	16

== Boxing ==
As of 26 May 2022, a squad of three boxers will take part in the competition.

Men

Athlete	Event	Round of 32	Round of 16	Quarterfinals	Semifinals	Final	
Athlete	Event	Opposition Result	Opposition Result	Opposition Result	Opposition Result	Opposition Result	Rank
Alex Isendi	Light welterweight	Ryan (ANT); L 0 - 5	did not advance				
Kassim Mbundwike	Light middleweight	Bye	Pafios (CYP); W 3 - 2	Ah Tong (SAM); W RSC	Muxanga (MOZ); L 0 - 5	Did not advance	3rd place, bronze medalist(s)
Yusuf Changalawe	Light heavyweight	Bye	Richardson (AIA); W 5 - 0	Langelier (LCA); W RSC	Lazzerini (SCO); L 1 - 4	Did not advance	3rd place, bronze medalist(s)

== Judo ==
As of 26 May 2022, a squad of two judoka will take part in the competition.

Athlete	Event	Round of 32	Round of 16	Quarterfinals	Semifinals	Repechage	Final/BM	
Athlete	Event	Opposition Result	Opposition Result	Opposition Result	Opposition Result	Opposition Result	Opposition Result	Rank
Thomas Mwenda	Men's -60 kg	Bennett (WAL); L 00 - 10	did not advance					17
Abdulrabi Abdulla	Men's -66 kg	—N/a	Mungandu (ZAM); L 00 - 10	did not advance				9

== Para powerlifting ==
Athlete	Event	Result	Rank
Yohana Mwila	Men's lightweight	100.7	9

== Swimming ==
As of 26 May 2022, a squad of two swimmers will take part in the competition.

Men

Athlete	Event	Heat		Semifinal		Final	
Athlete	Event	Time	Rank	Time	Rank	Time	Rank
Collins Saliboko	50 m freestyle	24.44	40	did not advance			
Collins Saliboko	100 m freestyle	52.54	33	did not advance			
Collins Saliboko	200 m freestyle	1:57.76	29	—N/a		did not advance	
Collins Saliboko	50 m butterfly	25.52	29	did not advance			
Collins Saliboko	100 m butterfly	56.85	31	did not advance			

Women

Athlete	Event	Heat		Semifinal		Final	
Athlete	Event	Time	Rank	Time	Rank	Time	Rank
Kayla Temba	50 m freestyle	33.08	67	did not advance			
Kayla Temba	50 m backstroke	39.76	37	did not advance			
