= Tanzania at the 2026 Commonwealth Games =

- Flag of Tanzania
- CG code: TAN
- CGA: Tanzania Olympic Committee
- Website: tanzaniaolympics.org

in Glasgow, Scotland 23 July 2026 – 2 August 2026
- Competitors: 12 in 4 sports
- Flag bearer (opening): Collins Saliboko
- Baton bearer: Zawadi Kutaka
- Flag bearer (closing): Sinead Fielding
- Medals: Gold 0 Silver 0 Bronze 0 Total 0

Commonwealth Games appearances (overview)
- 1962; 1966; 1970; 1974; 1978; 1982; 1986; 1990; 1994; 1998; 2002; 2006; 2010; 2014; 2018; 2022; 2026; 2030

Tanzania competed at the 2026 Commonwealth Games in Glasgow, Scotland. This marked Tanzania's 16th participation at the games, after making its debut at the 1962 Commonwealth Games.

The Tanzanian team was scheduled to compete in four sports: Athletics, boxing, judo and swimming.

Tanzania announced a 12 member team for the 2026 Commonwealth Games in Glasgow, Scotland, on 13 July 2026 with athletics forming the bulk of the squad. The delegation comprises six track and field athletes, three boxers, two judokas, and one swimmer.

Swimmer Collins Saliboko was the country's opening ceremony flagbearer. Meanwhile, boxer Zawadi Kutaka was the baton bearer during the opening ceremony. Local volunteer Sinead Fielding served as the country's closing ceremony flagbearer.

The Tanzanian team won no medals.

== Competitors ==
The following is the list of number of competitors participating at the Games per sport/discipline.

Sport	Men	Women	Total
Athletics	3	3	6
Boxing	2	1	3
Judo	2	0	2
Swimming	1	0	1
Total	8	4	12

== Athletics ==
Tanzania entered six athletes (three men and three women).

Key

Ranks given for track events are within the athlete's heat only.

- Q = Qualified for the next round
- q = Qualified for the next round as a fastest loser or, in field events, by position without achieving the qualifying target

Athlete	Event	Heat		Semifinal		Final	
Athlete	Event	Result	Rank	Result	Rank	Result	Rank
Josephat Gisemo	Men's mile	4:09.86	11	—N/a		Did not advance	
Josephat Gisemo	Men's 5000 m	—N/a				14:05.52	20
Daniel Sinda	Men's mile	4:08.24	11	—N/a		Did not advance	
Daniel Sinda	Men's 5000 m	—N/a				13:59.41	19
Benjamin Ratsim	Men's 5000 m	—N/a				13:49.03	17
Benjamin Ratsim	Men's 10,000 m	—N/a				27:59.70	8
Winfrida Makenji	Women's 100 m	11.65	4	Did not advance			
Winfrida Makenji	Women's 200 m	23.88 NR	3 q	23.99	8	Did not advance	
Hamida Mussa	Women's mile	5:01.34	11	—N/a		Did not advance	
Hamida Mussa	Women's 5000 m	—N/a				DNF	
Sisilia Panga	Women's 5000 m	—N/a				15:43.43	17

== Boxing ==
Tanzania entered three boxers (two men and one woman).

Athlete	Event	Round of 32	Round of 16	Quarterfinals	Semifinals	Final	
Athlete	Event	Opposition Result	Opposition Result	Opposition Result	Opposition Result	Opposition Result	Rank
Faki Issa Faki	Men's 55 kg	Mwale (ZAM); L RSC	Did not advance				
Yusuf Changalawe	Men's 80 kg	Akintola (NGR); W 4–1	Okaka (KEN); L 0–5	Did not advance			
Zawadi Kutaka	Women's 57 kg	—N/a	Bye	Maselele (LES); L 1–4	Did not advance		

== Judo ==
Tanzania entered two male judoka.

Men

Athlete	Event	Round of 16	Quarterfinal	Semifinal	Repechage	Final / BM	
Athlete	Event	Opposition Result	Opposition Result	Opposition Result	Opposition Result	Opposition Result	Rank
Ibrahim Khamis	60 kg	Phuthego (BOT); L 000s3–100s1	Did not advance				
Andrew Mlugu	81 kg	Dick (SEY); W 110s2–010s1	Ochi (AUS); L 000s1–100s1	Did not advance	Nkero (GAB); L 000–002	Did not advance	7

== Swimming ==
Tanzania entered one male swimmer.

Men

Athlete	Event	Heat		Semifinal		Final	
Athlete	Event	Time	Rank	Time	Rank	Time	Rank
Collins Saliboko	100 m freestyle	53.10	45	Did not advance			
Collins Saliboko	200 m freestyle	1:56.20	27	—N/a		Did not advance	
Collins Saliboko	50 m backstroke	28.31	30	Did not advance			
Collins Saliboko	50 m butterfly	25.67	42	Did not advance			
Collins Saliboko	100 m butterfly	57.76	30	Did not advance			
