= Auckland Showgrounds =

Showground in Auckland, New Zealand

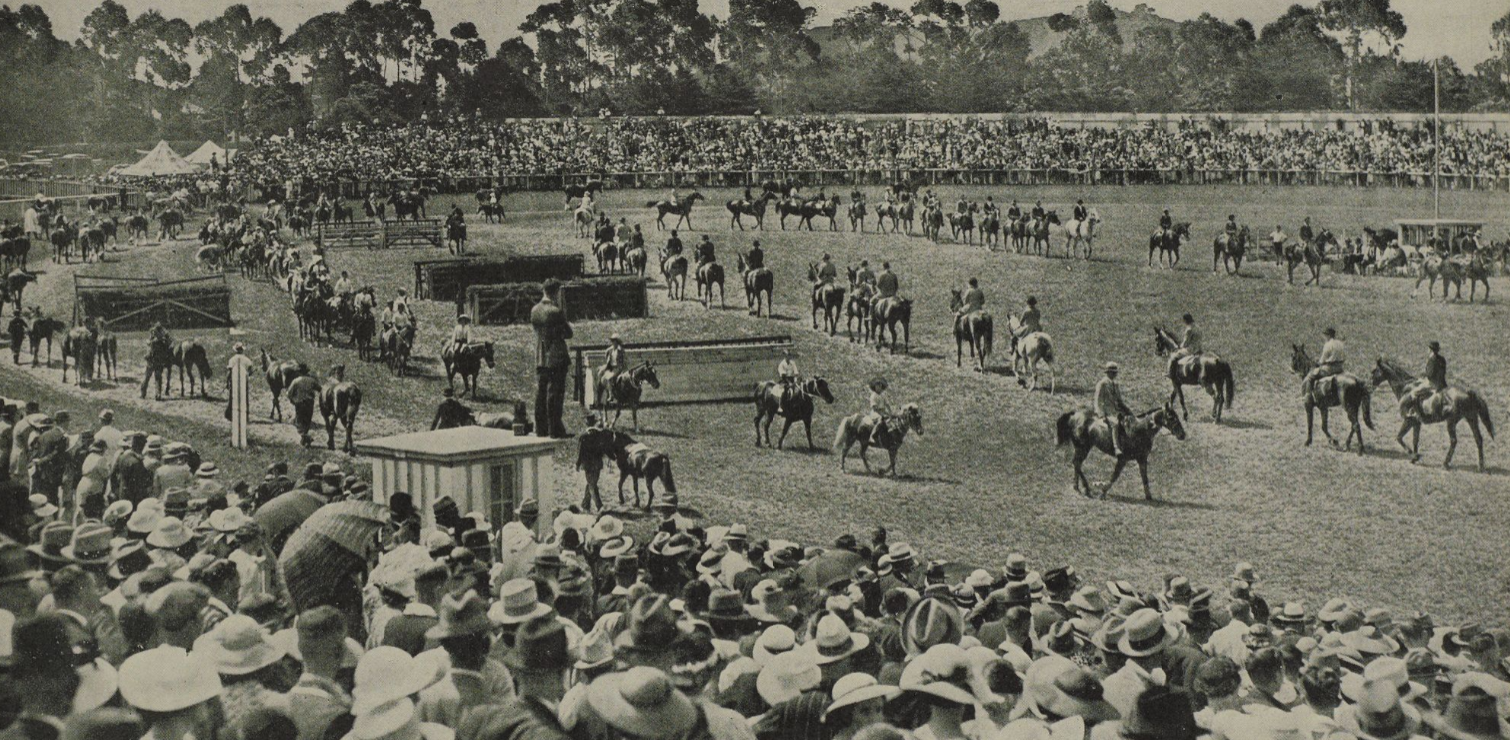
- People's Day at the 1938 Auckland Agricultural and Pastoral Association Show; Auckland Libraries Heritage Collections
- Interactive map of Auckland Showgrounds
- Location: 217 Green Lane West, Epsom, Auckland 1051, New Zealand
- Coordinates: 36°53′32″S 174°46′53″E

Construction
- Opened: 19 December 1843

Auckland Showgrounds (formerly known as Epsom Showgrounds and ASB Showgrounds) is an outdoor recreational area located off Green Lane West, in Epsom, Auckland, New Zealand. Originally an agricultural show it evolved into a space to host events, exhibitions, trade shows and markets. The main exhibition area houses nine halls. The site is adjacent to the Alexandra Park Raceway and Cornwall Park.

== History ==
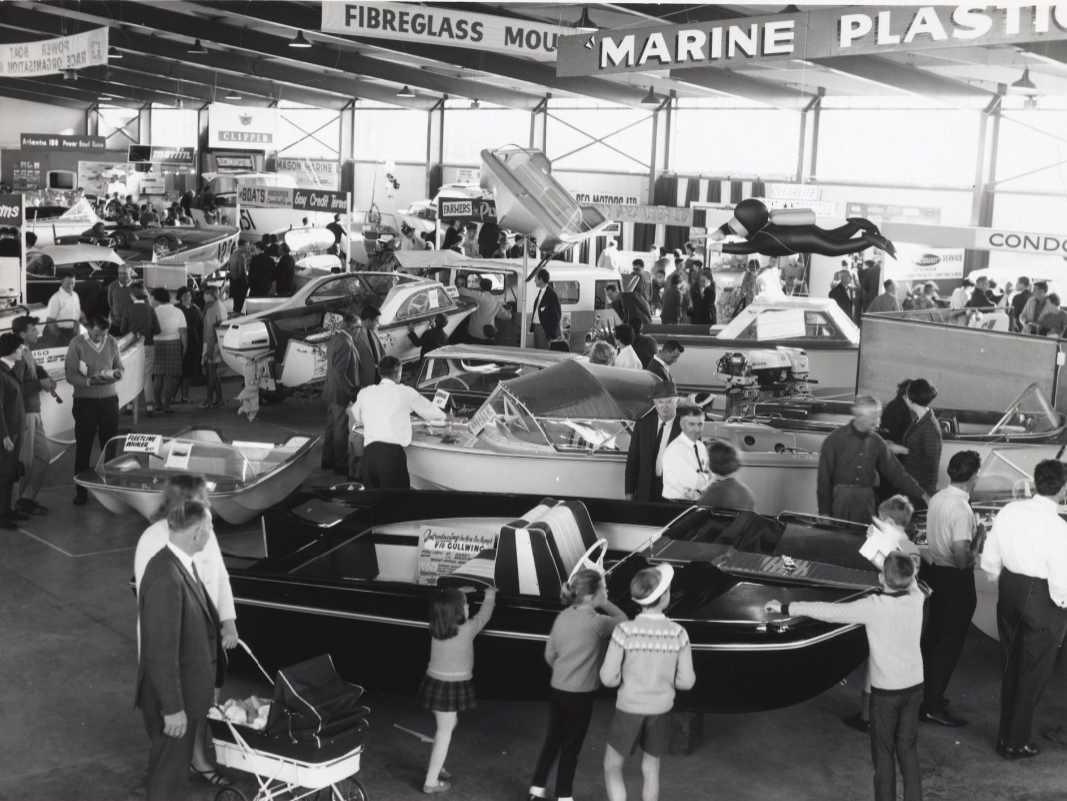
Boat and Caravan show in 1968 Auckland Libraries Heritage Collections

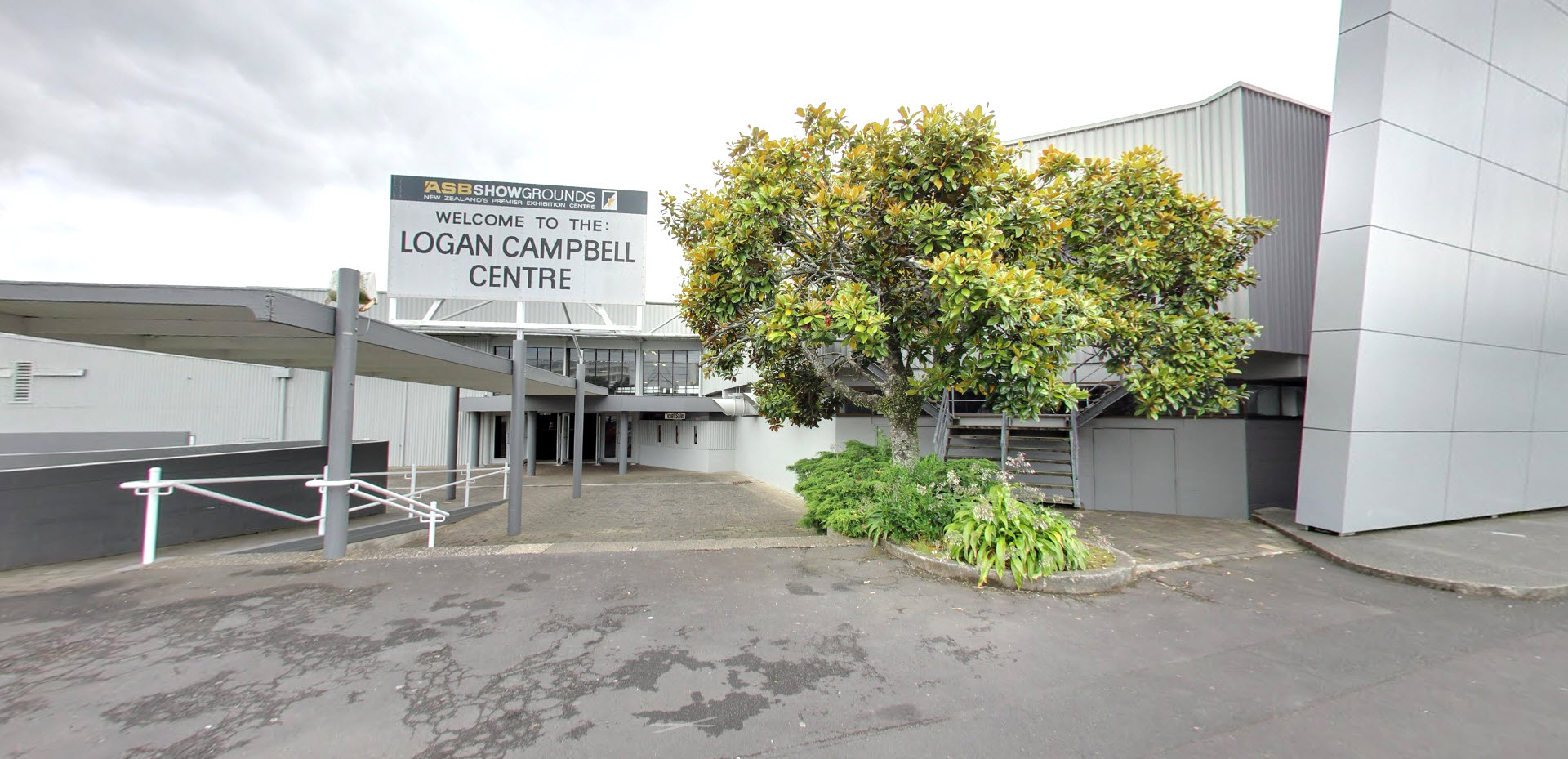
The Logan Campbell Centre hosts music events

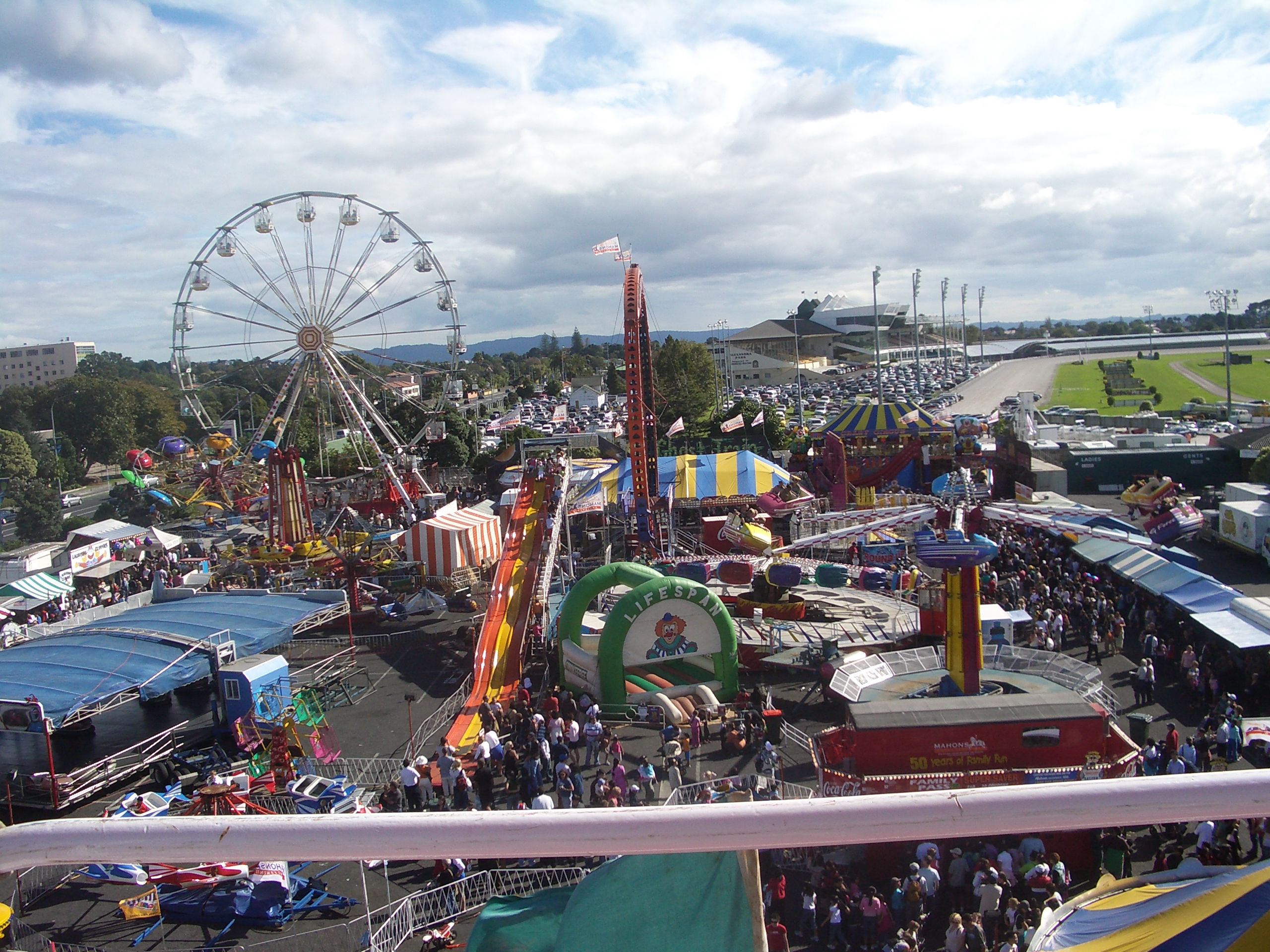
The Easter Show in 2006

The showgrounds first hosted an agricultural show on 19 December 1843. The event was organised by the Auckland Agricultural and Pastoral Association to display livestock and promote breeding. The show continued every year with a few exceptions such as the World War II years and in 1953 it became known as the Auckland Easter Show.

In 1990, the boxing events for the 1990 Commonwealth Games were held the 3,000 seater Logan Campbell Centre, one of the buildings on site. The centre continued to be used for music events and became a well known music venue.

Other 1990 Commonwealth Games venues on site included the East Pavilion in the Auckland Expo Center, which held the judo events and the Carter Holt Pavilion (hall 2), which held the weightlifting events.

In 2021, the venue's operator ASB Showgrounds went into liquidation following difficulties experienced by the COVID-19 pandemic and disagreements with the landlord, the Cornwall Park Trust.
