= Monty Wright (boxer) =

British boxer (born 1969)

Personal information
- Nationality: United Kingdom
- Born: 1 November 1969 (age 56) Bedford

Sport
- Sport: Boxing

Monty Wright (born 1969) is a retired British boxer.

== Boxing career ==
He represented England in the -81 kg light-heavyweight division, at the 1990 Commonwealth Games in Auckland, New Zealand.

He turned professional on 10 November 1993 and fought in 23 fights, winning 18 and losing 5.
