= Boxing at the 2018 Commonwealth Games – Men's light heavyweight =

Boxing competitions

Boxing – Men's light heavyweight at the 2018 Commonwealth Games
- Venue: Oxenford Studios
- Dates: 9 – 14 April 2018
- Competitors: 13 from 13 nations

Medalists
gold medal	Sammy Lee	Wales
silver medal	Ato Plodzicki-Faoagali	Samoa
bronze medal	Clay Waterman	Australia
bronze medal	Harley O'Reilly	Canada

The men's light heavyweight boxing competitions at the 2018 Commonwealth Games in Gold Coast, Australia took place between 9 and 14 April at Oxenford Studios. Light heavyweights were limited to those boxers weighing less than 81 kilograms.

Like all Commonwealth boxing events, the competition was a straight single-elimination tournament. Both semifinal losers were awarded bronze medals, so no boxers competed again after their first loss. Bouts consisted of three rounds of three minutes each, with one-minute breaks between rounds. Beginning this year, the competition was scored using the "must-ten" scoring system.

== Schedule ==
The schedule is as follows:

All times are Australian Eastern Standard Time (UTC+10)

Date	Time	Round
Monday 9 April 2018	14:17	Round of 16
Wednesday 11 April 2018	20:47	Quarter-finals
Friday 13 April 2018	21:02	Semi-finals
Saturday 14 April 2018	20:17	Final

== Results ==
The draw is as follows:

Round of 16
Lukmon Lawal (NGR)	1
Regarn Simbwa (UGA)	4
Sean Lazzerini (SCO)	1
Clay Waterman (AUS)	4
Mbachi Kaonga (ZAM)	4
Nickson Abaka (KEN)	1
Ian Darby (JAM)	0
Ato Plodzicki-Faoagali (SAM)	5
Louis Cedric Olivier (MRI)	0
Harley O'Reilly (CAN)	5

Quarterfinals
Sammy Lee (WAL)	3
Regarn Simbwa (UGA)	1
Clay Waterman (AUS)	4
Mbachi Kaonga (ZAM)	1
Awais Ali Khan (PAK)	0
Ato Plodzicki-Faoagali (SAM)	5
Harley O'Reilly (CAN)	W/O
Ulrich Rodrigue Yombo (CMR)

Semifinals
Sammy Lee (WAL)	4
Clay Waterman (AUS)	1
Ato Plodzicki-Faoagali (SAM)	4
Harley O'Reilly (CAN)	1

Final
Sammy Lee (WAL)	5
Ato Plodzicki-Faoagali (SAM)	0
