= Auckland Easter Show =

Annual festive event in New Zealand

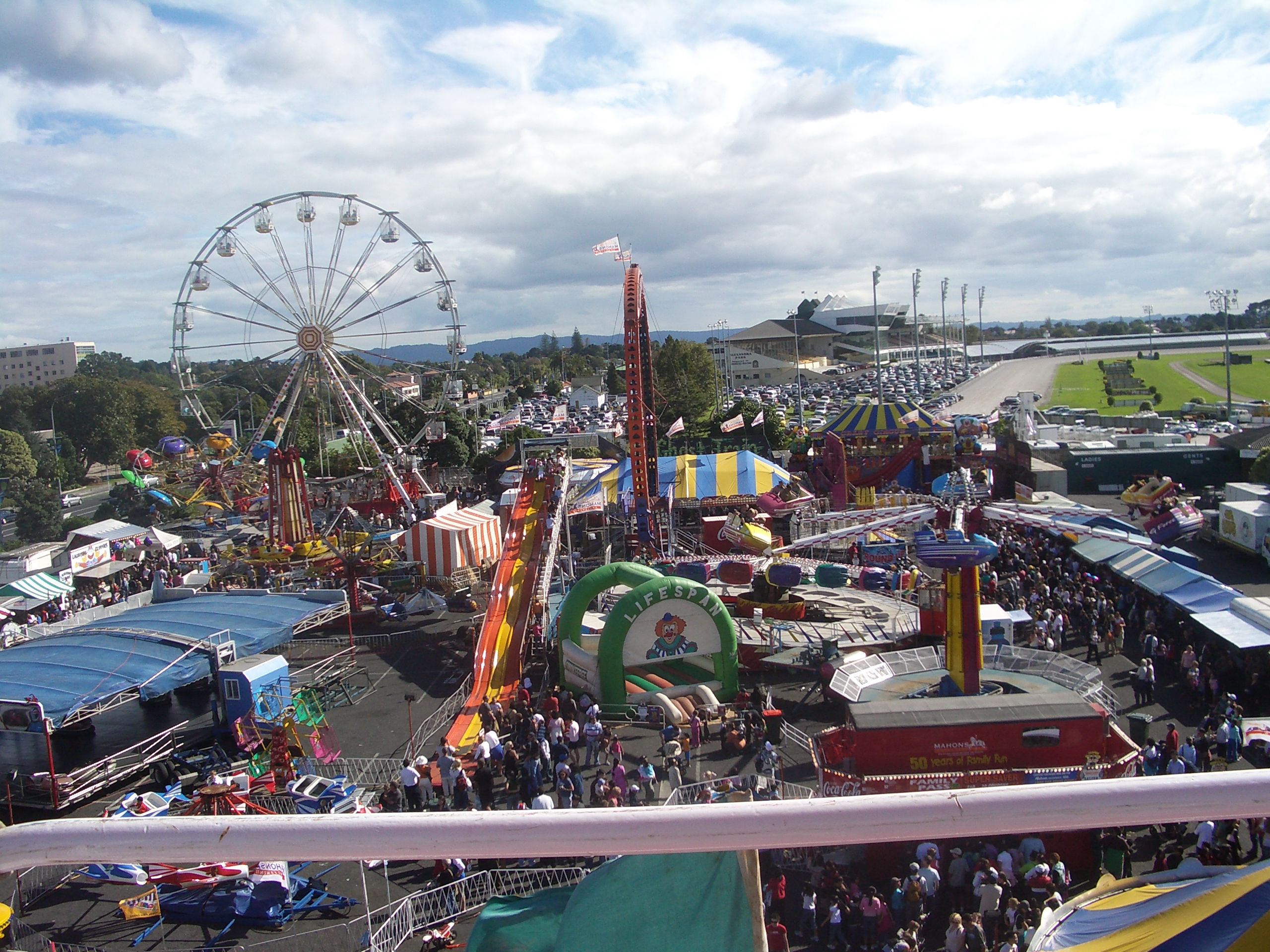
- The Royal Easter Show in 2006.
- Frequency: Annual
- Location: Epsom Showgrounds
- Inaugurated: 1843; 183 years ago
- Most recent: 2026
- Website: www.eastershow.co.nz

The Royal Easter Show is an event held annually during Easter in Auckland, New Zealand. It was first held in 1843 as a livestock showing by the Agricultural and Pastoral Association, and since then has included agricultural events, art exhibitions, live entertainment, sporting event, rides, sideshows, a marketplace and circuses. The show is held at the Auckland Showgrounds in Epsom. Due to the COVID-19 pandemic in New Zealand, the show was not held in 2020 or 2021 or 2022.

== History ==
The precursor to the Royal Easter Show was first held in 1843 by The Auckland Agricultural and Pastoral Association. The event consisted of livestock showings in order to promote farming endeavors and breed diversity during early European settlement. These A&P shows grew in popularity nationwide and by the late 20th century had incorporated entertainment such as bands, merry-go-rounds and other fairground entertainment.

It was not until 1953 that The Auckland Agricultural and Pastoral Association and Auckland Manufacturers’ Association collaborated in hosting the first Easter agricultural show, aptly titled the "New Zealand Easter Show". The goal was to exhibit and strengthen ties between Aotearoa's agricultural and manufacturing industries. The show was opened by Prime Minister Sidney Holland and featured exhibits from both industry and the New Zealand government. The entertainment programme, however, contained a range of events and shows such as, pig trotting, sheep dog and shearing displays, rugby matches, and fireworks. Over the course of two years, the Auckland Easter Show's popularity grew exponentially from 150,000 attendees in 1955 to 238,000 in 1957. As its popularity grew, concerns were raised that holding both an Easter Show and a Spring A&P Show were too intensive for the association, and later, in 1971 both the Spring and Easter Shows were combined into one event.

The Easter Show was given its current Royal title in 1983 by the Royal Agricultural Society, being known officially as "The Royal Easter Show of Champions".

In 2013, the show featured the largest ferris wheel in Auckland's history. The free event in 2014 attracted more than 130,000 attendees. In 2016, hundreds of people claimed that they would boycott the show after pictures of injured animals were shared. The free event in 2019 offered farm animals, FMX shows, a Looney Tunes Live Show, rides and a performance by Tiki Taane.

The 2020 show, scheduled for 9 –13 April, was cancelled due to crowd restrictions introduced to combat the COVID-19 pandemic in New Zealand. This was only the second time in 177 years that the show was not held. The 2021 and 2022 shows were also cancelled due to the same restrictions. In 2023, after three years, the Royal Easter Show returned with 75,000 attendees over the opening Friday and weekend, with the show being regularly held since.

== Competitions and awards ==
The Royal Easter Show is host to the Wine Awards, beginning in 1952 with over 500 wines submitted by 1993. As New Zealand's longest-running wine competition, according to 2013 winners Yealands Wine Group, is therefore also one of the most competitive. Also hosted are the Art Awards, New Zealand's largest open art competition.

== See also ==
- Sydney Royal Easter Show
