= Joseph Laryea =

Ghanaian boxer

Personal information
- Nationality: Ghanaian
- Born: 2 May 1965 (age 60); Accra, Ghana

Sport
- Sport: Boxing

Joseph Laryea (born 02 May 1965) is a Ghanaian former professional boxer who competed from 1987 to 2001. As an amateur, he competed in the men's middleweight event at the 1992 Summer Olympics. Please note there are two professional Ghanaian boxers named Joseph Laryea. However, only one participated in the 1992 summer Olympics and this page has thus been edited to reflect that.
