= Athletics at the 2010 Commonwealth Games – Women's shot put =

Women's shot put at the Commonwealth Games

The Women's shot put at the 2010 Commonwealth Games as part of the athletics programme was held at the Jawaharlal Nehru Stadium on Saturday 9 October 2010.

== Records ==
World Record	22.63	Natalya Lisovskaya	URS	Moscow, Soviet Union	7 June 1987
Games Record	19.66	Valerie Vili	NZL	Melbourne, Australia	22 March 2006

== Results ==
Rank	Athlete	1	2	3	4	5	6	Result	Notes
1st place, gold medalist(s)	Valerie Adams (NZL)	20.47	20.39	20.08	20.31	20.44	20.14	20.47	GR
2nd place, silver medalist(s)	Cleopatra Borel-Brown (TRI)	19.03	18.91	18.70	18.65	18.42	18.46	19.03	
3rd place, bronze medalist(s)	Margaret Satupai (SAM)	x	16.15	15.69	16.14	16.43	x	16.43	PB
4	Zara Northover (JAM)	15.73	15.33	x	15.55	16.31	15.69	16.31	
5	Rebecca Peake (ENG)	14.57	x	14.71	16.04	16.28	15.21	16.28	
6	Joanne Mirtschin (AUS)	15.20	15.68	15.19	x	15.48	16.23	16.23	
7	Eleanor Gatrell (ENG)	14.51	14.58	14.98	14.76	15.23	14.54	15.23	
8	Nadia Alexander (JAM)	14.94	x	14.96	x	x	x	14.96	
9	Manpreet Kaur (IND)	13.00	14.50	x				14.50	
10	Priscilla Isiao Lwanziro (KEN)	13.77	13.91	13.54				13.91	PB
11	Patwant Kaur (IND)	11.96	12.08	12.63				12.63	
12	Melissa Alfred (DMA)	11.70	x	x				11.70	
