= Jon Jo Irwin =

English boxer (born 1969)

Personal information
- Nationality: English
- Born: John Irwin; 31 May 1969 (age 57) Denaby, Doncaster, England
- Height: 5 ft 8 in (1.73 m)
- Weight: feather/super featherweight

Boxing career
- Stance: Orthodox

Boxing record
- Total fights: 30
- Wins: 19 (KO 5)
- Losses: 5 (KO 3)
Medal record
Boxing
Representing England
Commonwealth Games
Gold medal – first place	1990 Auckland	featherweight

John Irwin (born 31 May 1969, Doncaster), known as Jon Jo Irwin, is a retired English amateur featherweight and professional feather/super featherweight boxer of the 1990s.

== Boxing career ==
=== Amateur ===
As an amateur he represented England and won a gold medal in the -57 kg featherweight division, at the 1990 Commonwealth Games in Auckland, New Zealand.

He also won the prestigious 1991 ABA featherweight championship, against Mark Bowers (Pinewood Starr ABC (Crowthorne), boxing out of Tom Hill ABC (Doncaster).

=== Professional ===
As a professional won the Irish featherweight title, World Boxing Board (WBB) super featherweight title, World Boxing Organization (WBO) Inter-Continental featherweight title, British Boxing Board of Control (BBBofC) British featherweight title, and Commonwealth featherweight title, and was a challenger for the BBBofC British featherweight title against Paul Ingle, and European Boxing Union (EBU) featherweight title against Steve Robinson, his professional fighting weight varied from 124 3/4 lb (56.6 kg; 8 st 12.8 lb), i.e. featherweight to 129 lb (59 kg; 9 st 3 lb), i.e. super featherweight.
