= Sammy Lee (boxer) =

Welsh boxer (born 1999)

Personal information
- Born: 14 January 1999 (age 27) Neath, Wales
- Height: 6 ft 1 in (185 cm)
- Weight: Light-heavyweight

Boxing career
- Stance: Southpaw

Boxing record
- Total fights: 2
- Wins: 2
- Win by KO: 1
Medal record
Men's amateur boxing
Representing Wales
Commonwealth Games
Gold medal – first place	2018 Gold Coast	Light heavyweight

Sammy Lee (born 14 January 1999) is a British amateur boxer who is affiliated with Premier ABC. He won light heavyweight gold in the 2018 Commonwealth Games.

Lee was selected to compete at the 2019 World Championships in Yekaterinburg, Russia, where he lost by split decision (4:1) to Georgy Kushitashvili in the second round.
