= Emerio Fainuulua =

Samoan boxer

Emerio Fainuulua (born 1963 or 1964 (age 61–62)) is a male boxer from Samoa. He competed at the 1990 Commonwealth Games, where he won a bronze medal for boxing in the Men's Heavyweight class.

Fainuulua is a cousin of Samoan boxer Sililo Figota.
