= Warren Fuavailili =

Samoan boxer

Warren Fuavailili is a boxer from Samoa.

He competed at the 2006 Commonwealth Games, where he won a bronze medal for boxing in the Men's Middleweight (75 kg) class. In 2008 Fuavailili started training the University of Toledo Boxing team, after helping Jonathan Stubenhuis, also from Samoa become the MAC champion, Fuavailili left to continue training for the upcoming Olympics.
