= Naman Tanwar =

Indian boxer (born 1999)

Personal information
- Born: 25 September 1998 (age 27) VPO Haluwas in District Bhiwani, Haryana, India
- Height: 1.90 m (6 ft 3 in)
- Weight: 91 kg (201 lb)

Sport
- Sport: Boxing
- Weight class: Heavyweight
- Coached by: Sanjay Sheoran
Medal record
Men's amateur boxing
Representing India
Commonwealth Games
Bronze medal – third place	2018 Gold Coast	Heavyweight

Naman Tanwar (born 25 September 1998) is an Indian boxer who started boxing under Vishnu Bhagwan(Coach) in Bheem Stadium, Haryana. He did his schooling from Bhiwani Public School, Bhiwani.

He won a bronze medal in Commonwealth Games held at Gold Coast, Queensland.

== Boxing career ==
Professional record summary

0 fights	0 wins	0 losses

No.	Result	Record	Opponent	Type	Round, time	Date	Location	Notes
3	Loss		(Australia) Jason Whateley					
2	Win		(Samoa) Frank Masoe					
1	Win		(Tanzania) Haruna Mhando					
