= Sililo Figota =

Samoan / New Zealand boxer

Sililo "Joe" Figota Manuele (born 5 December 1965) is a male boxer from Samoa. He was born in Faleapuna village in the Va'a-o-Fonoti district at the north east of Upolu island.

He competed in the 1990 Commonwealth Games for Western Samoa, where he won a bronze medal for boxing in the Men's Light Middleweight class. He then competed at the 1992 Summer Olympics for New Zealand.
