= Samoa Association of Sports and National Olympic Committee =

National Olympic Committee

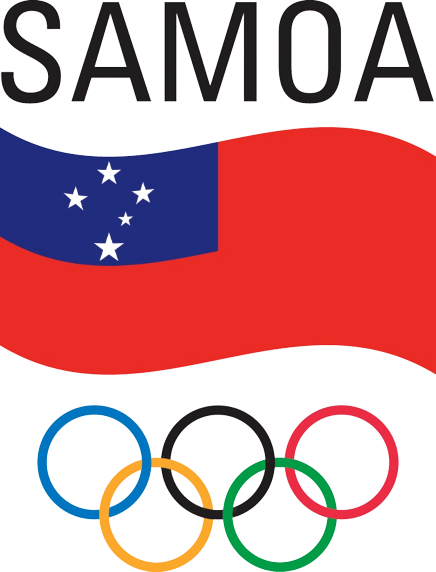
- Country: Samoa
- Code: SAM
- Recognized: 1983
- Continental Association: ONOC
- President: Tuaopepe Jerry Wallwork
- Website: sasnoc.com

The Samoa Association of Sports and National Olympic Committee (IOC code: SAM) is the National Olympic Committee representing Samoa.

== See also ==
- Samoa at the Olympics
- Samoa at the Commonwealth Games
