= 1990 Commonwealth Games =

Multi-sport event in Auckland, New Zealand

XIV Commonwealth Games
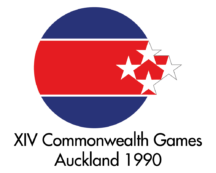
- Host city: Auckland, New Zealand
- Motto: This is the Moment (Māori: Ko te moma tenei)
- Nations: 55
- Athletes: 2,074
- Events: 213 events in 10 sports
- Opening: 24 January 1990
- Closing: 3 February 1990
- Opened by: Prince Edward
- Closed by: Elizabeth II
- Queen's Baton Final Runners: Mark Todd and Peter Snell
- Main venue: Mount Smart Stadium

The 1990 Commonwealth Games (Māori: 1990 Taumāhekeheke Commonwealth) were held in Auckland, New Zealand from 24 January to 3 February 1990. It was the 14th Commonwealth Games, and part of New Zealand's 1990 sesquicentennial celebrations.

Participants competed in ten sports: athletics, aquatics, badminton, boxing, cycling, gymnastics, judo, lawn bowls, shooting and weightlifting. Judo and gymnastics are added as optional sports effectively replacing wrestling, which was dropped from the Games for the first time and rowing which had been held for the last time.

Netball and the triathlon were demonstration events.

== Host selection ==
The event was awarded to Auckland on 27 July 1984 at the 1984 Summer Olympics in Los Angeles, USA. Perth, Australia, had withdrawn from the bid contest leaving New Delhi, India, as the sole opponent to Auckland's bid. New Delhi lost the hosting rights to Auckland by a margin of 1 vote, which made it the closest host selection vote in the history of Commonwealth Games.

1990 Commonwealth Games bidding results
City	Round 1
(New Zealand) Auckland	20
(India) New Delhi	19

== Venues ==
The primary venue was the Mount Smart Stadium, used for the opening and closing ceremonies and athletics events. The athletes' village was located in Glen Innes at the corner of Merton Road and Morrin Road, going south towards the base of Mount Wellington. It consisted of 17 acres of land owned by the University of Auckland and had a central dome for the catering facilities and around 300 houses were constructed and then relocated to various suburbs for state housing after the Games.

- Badminton - Gillies Avenue Auckland Badminton Hall
- Boxing - Logan Campbell Centre, Auckland Showgrounds
- Cycling (track) - Manukau Velodrome, Clover Park
- Cycling (team time trial) - Auckland Southern Motorway
- Cycling (road race) - Blockhouse Bay, Green Bay, Lower Titirangi, Avondale
- Gymnastics - Chase Stadium
- Judo - East Pavilion, Expo Centre, Auckland Showgrounds
- Lawn bowls - Pakuranga Bowls Centre
- Shooting - Waitemata Gun Club, Mangatawhiri Range, Ardmore Range
- Swimming - West Auckland Swimming Centre
- Weightlifting - Carter Holt Pavilion (hall 2), Auckland Showgrounds

== Opening ceremony ==
The opening of the games comprised a variety of events, including the arrival of The Queen's representative Prince Edward (her youngest son), the arrival of the Queen's Baton, and many Māori ceremonial stories. The Queens Baton was carried across the Auckland Harbour by the vessel "Ceduna".

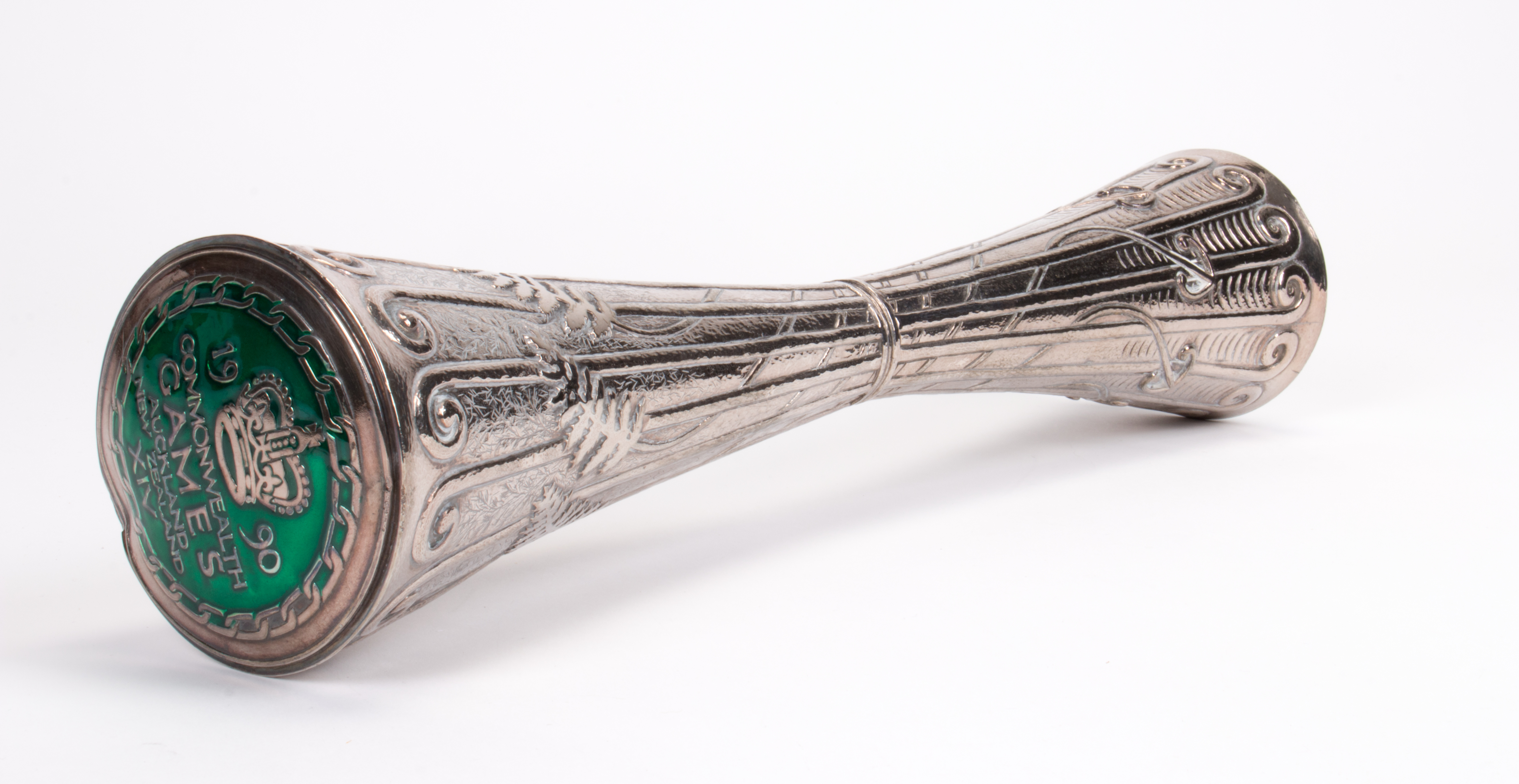
Queen's Baton's from the 1990 Commonwealth Games.

The opening ceremony itself started off with the Auckland Commonwealth Games Choir singing the Song of Welcome. Upon the arrival of Prince Edward, the Māori in attendance, gave him a Challenge of a welcome. This is conducted by a Māori placing a wooden baton on the ground. To see if the visitor comes in peace or not, the visitor must pick it up.

The New Zealand national anthem "God Defend New Zealand" was sung during a ceremonial fourteen gun salute from nearby One Tree Hill. This was followed by the New Zealand Army Guard Commander allowing Prince Edward to inspect the guard of honour. After which was the introduction of the participating countries of the Commonwealth, Scotland, entering first as the hosts of the previous games, and New Zealand entering last as hosts. During the introduction of the countries, the choir would display the flag of the announced country with boards.

When all the athletes finally sat down, the cultural segment ceremonies began. The first act was the Māori women performing a "Song of Welcome" for the athletes with the use of Poi. The Māori women then gave some of the athletes a Hongi. Next was the Māori story of how New Zealand was formed according to legend; it a narration of how the Polynesians found their way to what was to become New Zealand, and how New Zealand was formed between Rangi and Papa, the sky father and earth mother. The story then moved on to the coming of religion and European migration. This was demonstrated with a formation of the Union Jack, to show the colonisation by the British. Dame Whina Cooper then made a speech about the Treaty of Waitangi signed in 1840 that brought about peace and stability of modern New Zealand.

Introduction of the European communities was next with music and native dancing from European countries such as Italy, Poland, Greece, Netherlands, Scotland, Ireland, Austria, Wales and England, and music and native dancing also from Asian countries such as China, Sri Lanka and India. From here, many of the neighbouring Pacific Islanders made their entrance with the rhythmic tempo of the Pacific Island drum beat.This was to show the then complete migration of people to New Zealand.

Sir Howard Morrison then lead New Zealand in singing the folk song Tukua-a-hau. After Morrison, the Queen's Baton arrived at the stadium where Prince Edward announced the opening of the games which was followed by the Athletes Pledge.

Fireworks followed and was capped off with a night time flyover by nine A-4 Skyhawk jets of the Royal New Zealand Air Forces 75 Squadron. The ceremony was concluded by the singing of the game's motto "This is the moment" as performers and athletes exited the stadium.

== Closing ceremony ==
A more relaxed affair was held for the 14th Commonwealth Games closing ceremony. Attended by HM The Queen of New Zealand, formality and respect played their due part in the beginning with protocolar segment with the handover to the Commonwealth Games flag to the next host city, Victoria, Canada. This was followed by a First Nations and modern Canadian dancing display.

Next, thousands of children entered the stadium with a mass skipping rope demonstration, followed by the athletes. The Queen then made the traditional closing speech and called for all the Commonwealth's athletes to assemble in four years time in Victoria. As the evening wore on Dame Kiri Te Kanawa sang "Now is the Hour", a favourite New Zealand hymn, as the Royal New Zealand Air Force's A4 Skyhawks made one final swooping flyover of Mount Smart Stadium followed by fireworks. The Queen, Duke of Edinburgh, and Prince Edward then exited the stadium standing in open top vehicles.

== Mascot ==
Goldie the Kiwi bird – the Games' mascot

The mascot of the games was Goldie, representing New Zealand's national symbol the kiwi bird.

== Participating teams ==
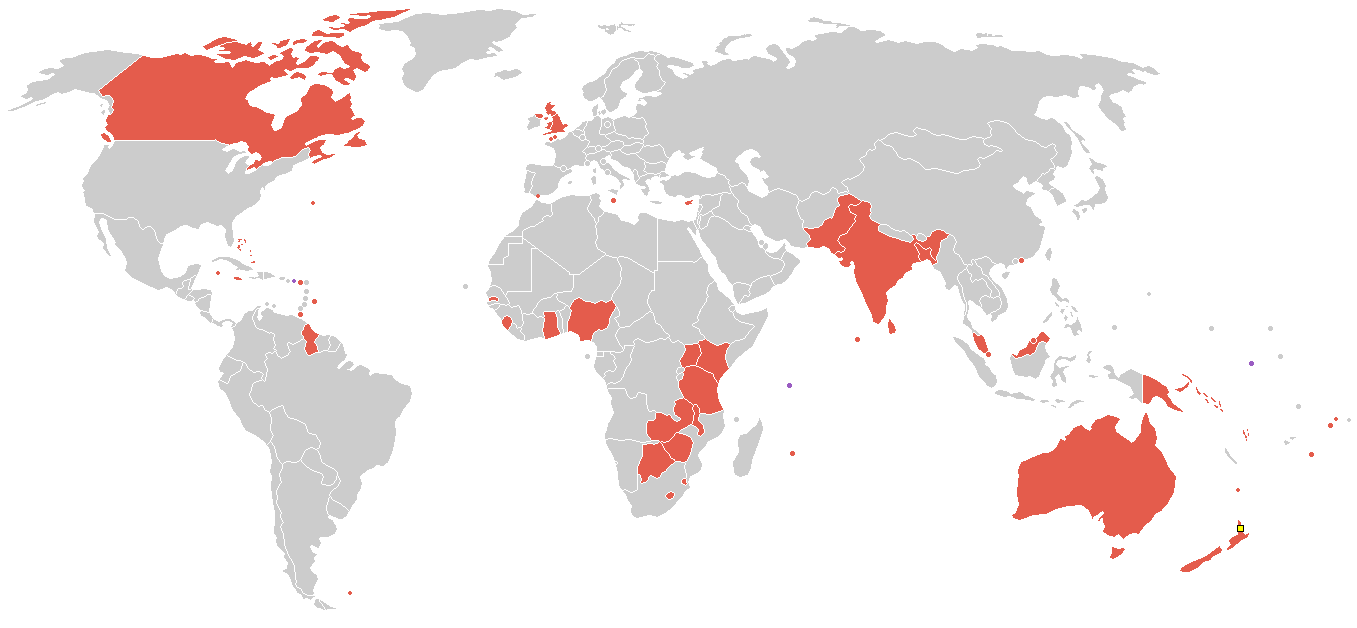
Participating countries

55 teams were represented at the 1990 Games.
(Teams competing for the first time are shown in bold).

Participating Commonwealth countries and territories
- Australia
- Bahamas
- Bangladesh
- Barbados
- Bermuda
- Botswana
- British Virgin Islands
- Brunei
- Canada
- Cayman Islands
- Cook Islands
- Cyprus
- England
- Falkland Islands
- Ghana
- Gibraltar
- Guernsey
- Guyana
- Hong Kong
- India
- Isle of Man
- Jamaica
- Jersey
- Kenya
- Lesotho
- Malawi
- Malaysia
- Maldives
- Malta
- Mauritius
- Nauru
- New Zealand **(host)**
- Nigeria
- Norfolk Island
- Northern Ireland
- Pakistan
- Papua New Guinea
- Saint Kitts and Nevis
- Scotland
- Seychelles
- Sierra Leone
- Singapore
- Solomon Islands
- Sri Lanka
- Swaziland
- Tanzania
- The Gambia
- Tonga
- Trinidad and Tobago
- Uganda
- Vanuatu
- Wales
- Western Samoa
- Zambia
- Zimbabwe
Debuting Commonwealth countries and territories
- British Virgin Islands
- Brunei
- Nauru
- Seychelles

== Medal table ==
This is the full table of the medal count of the 1990 Commonwealth Games. These rankings sort by the number of gold medals earned by a country. The number of silvers is taken into consideration next and then the number of bronze. If, after the above, countries are still tied, equal ranking is given and they are listed alphabetically. This follows the system used by the IOC, IAAF and BBC.

The medals for the 1990 Commonwealth Games were designed by medallion artist Marian Fountain.

Figures from Commonwealth Games Foundation website.

* Host nation (New Zealand)

Rank	Nation	Gold	Silver	Bronze	Total
1	Australia	52	54	58	164
2	England	47	40	42	129
3	Canada	36	42	38	116
4	New Zealand*	17	14	27	58
5	India	13	8	11	32
6	Wales	10	3	12	25
7	Kenya	6	9	3	18
8	Nigeria	5	13	7	25
9	Scotland	5	7	10	22
10	Malaysia	2	2	0	4
11	Jamaica	2	0	2	4
11	Uganda	2	0	2	4
13	Northern Ireland	1	3	5	9
14	Nauru	1	2	0	3
15	Hong Kong	1	1	3	5
16	Cyprus	1	1	0	2
17	Bangladesh	1	0	1	2
17	Jersey	1	0	1	2
19	Bermuda	1	0	0	1
19	Guernsey	1	0	0	1
19	Papua New Guinea	1	0	0	1
22	Zimbabwe	0	2	1	3
23	Ghana	0	2	0	2
24	Tanzania	0	1	2	3
25	Zambia	0	0	3	3
26	Bahamas	0	0	2	2
26	Western Samoa	0	0	2	2
28	Guyana	0	0	1	1
28	Malta	0	0	1	1
Totals (29 entries)		206	204	234	644

== Sports ==
- At these games, the Triathlon was a demonstration event; won by Erin Baker (women) and Rick Wells (men), both from New Zealand.
- Aquatics ()
  - Diving ()
  - Swimming ()
  - Synchronised swimming ()
- Athletics ()
- Badminton ()
- Boxing ()
- Cycling ()
- Gymnastics ()
- Judo ()
- Lawn bowls ()
- Shooting ()
- Weightlifting ()

Preceded by Edinburgh	Commonwealth Games; Auckland; XIV Commonwealth Games	Succeeded by Victoria
