= Athletics at the 2010 Asian Games – Men's 10,000 metres =

Men's 10,000 metres at the 2010 Asian Games
- Venue: Aoti Main Stadium
- Date: 26 November 2010
- Competitors: 13 from 10 nations

Medalists
gold medal	Bilisuma Shugi	Bahrain
silver medal	Essa Ismail Rashed	Qatar
bronze medal	Hasan Mahboob	Bahrain

The men's 10,000 metres event at the 2010 Asian Games was held at the Aoti Main Stadium, Guangzhou, China on 26 November 2010.

== Schedule ==
All times are China Standard Time (UTC+08:00)

Date	Time	Event
Friday, 26 November 2010	18:25	Final

== Records ==
Prior to this competition, the existing world, Asian and Games records were as follows.

World Record	Kenenisa Bekele (ETH)	26:17.53	Brussels, Belgium	26 August 2005
Asian Record	Ahmad Hassan Abdullah (QAT)	26:38.76	Brussels, Belgium	5 September 2003
Games Record	Hasan Mahboob (BRN)	27:58.88	Doha, Qatar	9 December 2006

== Results ==
Legend

- DNS — Did not start

Rank	Athlete	Time	Notes
1st place, gold medalist(s)	Bilisuma Shugi (BRN)	27:32.72	GR
2nd place, silver medalist(s)	Essa Ismail Rashed (QAT)	27:33.09	
3rd place, bronze medalist(s)	Hasan Mahboob (BRN)	27:40.07	
4	Mukhlid Al-Otaibi (KSA)	28:22.13	
5	Baek Seung-ho (KOR)	28:52.39	
6	Satoru Kitamura (JPN)	28:52.39	
7	James Kwalia (QAT)	28:55.14	
8	Suresh Kumar (IND)	28:59.98	
9	Agus Prayogo (INA)	29:25.77	
10	Wu Wen-chien (TPE)	30:07.87	
11	Ho Chin-ping (TPE)	30:41.43	
12	Dambadarjaagiin Gantulga (MGL)	32:40.87	
—	Hem Bunting (CAM)	DNS	
