= Dejen Gebremeskel =

Ethiopian long-distance runner

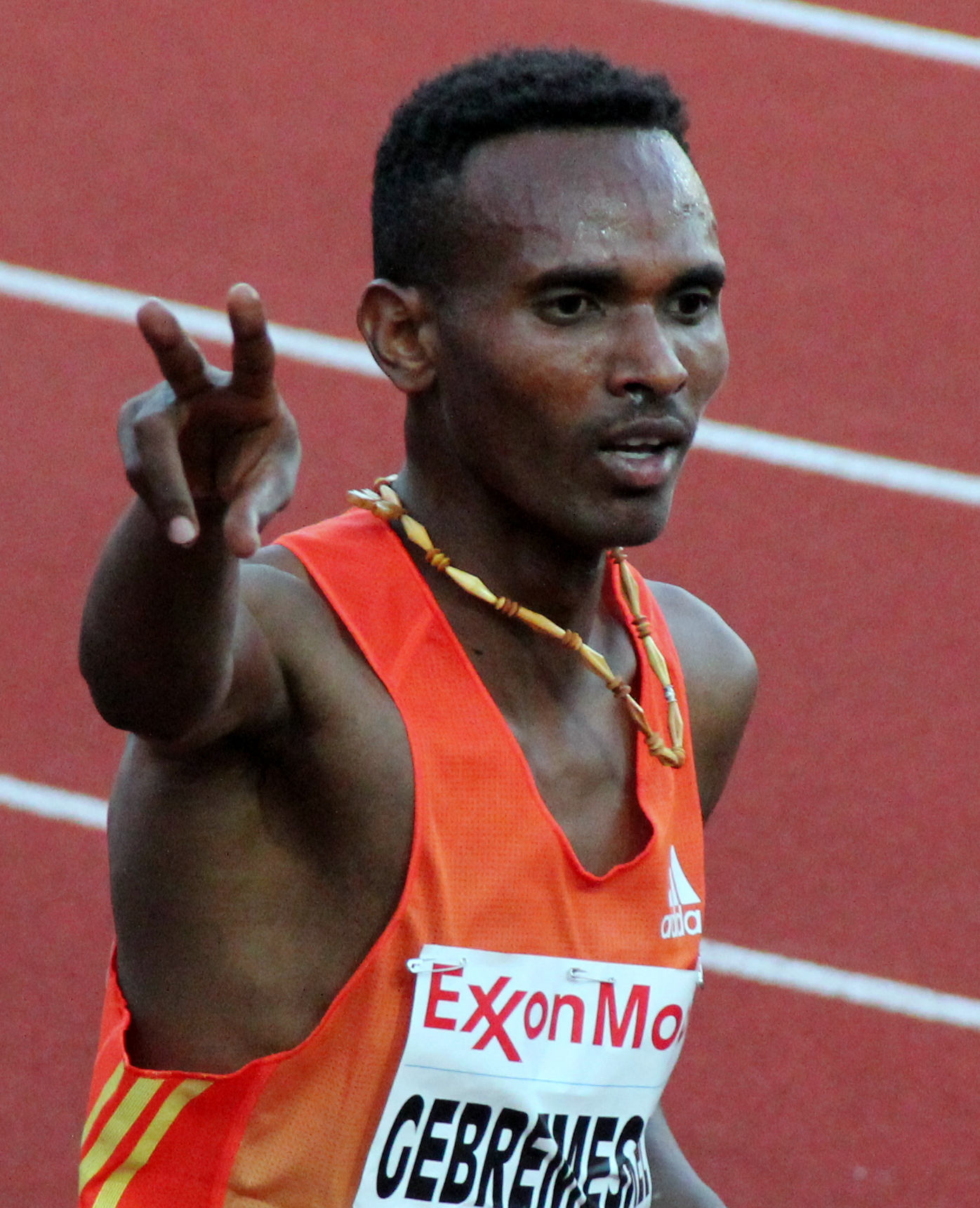
- Gebremeskel in 2012

Personal information
- Nationality: Ethiopian
- Born: 24 November 1989 (age 36)
- Height: 180 cm (5 ft 11 in)
- Weight: 58 kg (128 lb)

Sport
- Country: Ethiopia
- Sport: Track and field
- Events: 3000 m, 5000 m
Medal record
Representing Ethiopia
Olympic Games
Silver medal – second place	2012 London	5000 m
World Championships
Bronze medal – third place	2011 Daegu	5000 m
World Indoor Championships
Bronze medal – third place	2014 Sopot	3000 m

Dejen Gebremeskel (Amharic: ደጀን ገብረመስቀል; born 24 November 1989) is an Ethiopian long-distance runner who primarily competes in track events. His personal best of 12:46.81 minutes for the 5,000 metres ranks him as the fifteenth fastest of all time for the distance. He was the 5,000 m silver medallist at the 2012 London Olympics and took the bronze medal over that distance at the 2011 World Championships in Athletics.

He won his first track medals as a junior, coming in second at the African Junior Athletics Championships, then taking the bronze medal at the 2008 World Junior Championships in Athletics. He was a finalist at the IAAF World Indoor Championships in 2010 and 2012. He is a five-time winner of the Carlsbad 5000.

== Career ==
=== Junior career ===
Dejen Gebremeskel grew up in the rural setting of Gulo-Makeda woreda in northern Ethiopia and took up running as a child, representing his school. He began competing around the Tigray Region and after establishing himself in local races, he moved to Addis Ababa to train with the national team.

He won his first international medal at the 2007 African Junior Athletics Championships, taking the silver medal over 5,000 metres behind Mathew Kisorio. He had also competed abroad for the first time that year, running a personal best of 13:21.05 minutes to take sixth in the 5,000 m at the Flanders Cup meeting in Brasschaat. He ran for Ethiopia at the International Chiba Ekiden in 2008 and helped the team to victory, running the fastest time for his leg of the road relay.

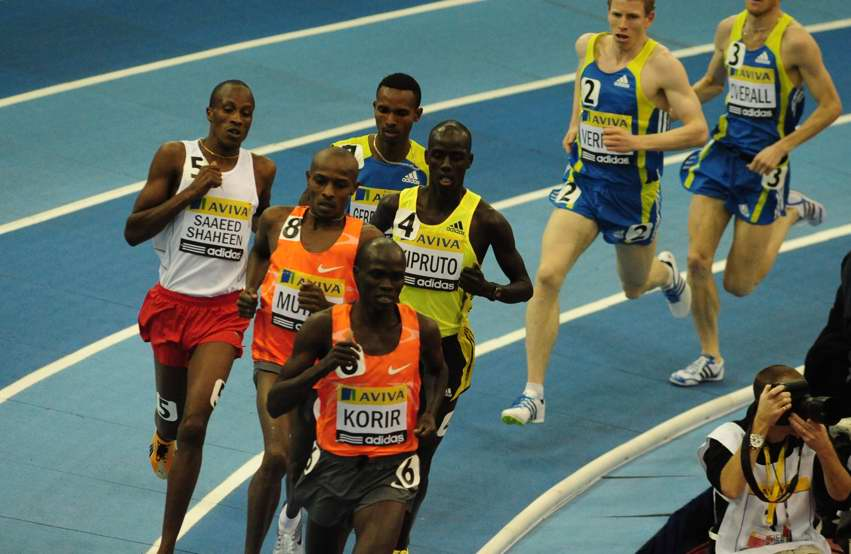
Dejen Gebremeskel (top centre) running in Birmingham in 2010.

Representing the Ethiopian Banks team, he won the junior title at the 2007 Addis Ababa cross country race, beating Hunegnaw Mesfin by a second. He was fourth in the junior category at the 2008 Ethiopian Cross Country Championships and was selected for the 2008 IAAF World Cross Country Championships, where he finished 18th (just outside the Ethiopian team which won the silver medal). Back on the track, he ran at the Adidas Track Classic in May and set a new personal best of 13:08.96 minutes, second only to Ali Abdosh. He was among the fastest entrants at the 2008 World Junior Championships in Athletics and took the 5,000 m bronze medal while his compatriot Abreham Cherkos won the gold.

=== Start of senior career ===
At the 2009 Ethiopian cross country trials in February, he came in third place. His main focus for the year was on track races and he had a successful transition into the senior ranks, winning at the Adidas Track Classic in May then improved his 5,000 m best to 13:03.13 min by taking third at the Reebok Grand Prix in New York City, where he was beaten only by Olympic medalists Micah Kogo and Bernard Lagat. He ran a 3,000 metres best of 7:58.69 m at the Prefontaine Classic and came fourth at that year's London Grand Prix.

Dejen competed indoors for the first time the following year and was second at the Boston Indoor Games behind Lagat. He was also the runner-up at the Birmingham Indoor Grand Prix two weeks later and was selected to represent Ethiopia over 3,000 m at the 2010 IAAF World Indoor Championships. He ran the second fastest qualifying time (a personal best of 7:44.26 min), but did not perform as well in the event final, coming tenth. Outdoors, he was second at the Carlsbad 5000, the Prefontaine Classic, and the DN Galan (at which he ran a personal best of 12:53.56 min for the 5,000 m).

=== World and Olympic medals ===
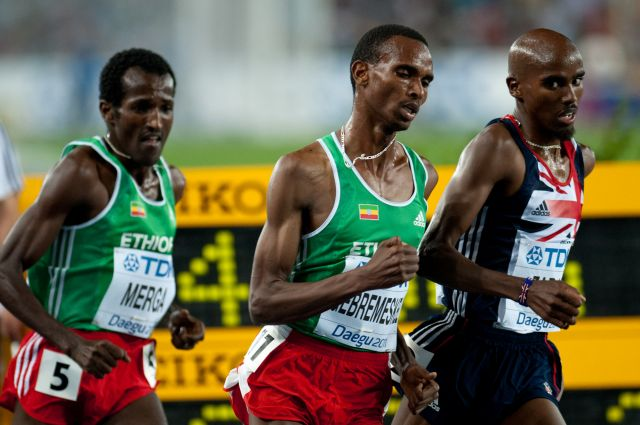
Dejen (centre) racing against Mo Farah and Imane Merga in the 2011 World Championships final

He continued to focus on the track in 2011 and at the New Balance Indoor Grand Prix he defeated Mo Farah in unusual circumstances – Dejen lost a shoe on the first lap of the race, but he persisted and won in a time of 7:35.37 minutes, one of the fastest 3,000 m runs that year. He debuted over the 10K road distance later that month and was runner-up to Sammy Kitwara at the World's Best 10K with a time of 27:45. He won the Carlsbad 5K race in April, holding off Eliud Kipchoge, and took his first win on the Diamond League circuit with a victory at the Adidas Grand Prix in New York City. A run of 12:55.89 at the Golden Gala made him Ethiopia's second fastest 5000 m runner that season and he was selected for the national team for the 2011 World Championships in Athletics. He comfortably progressed through the qualifying round and the 5000 m final came down to a four-way battle among himself, Farah, Lagat and Imane Merga. He was the last of the quartet to cross the line, but Imane Merga was disqualified after the medal ceremony as he had run outside of the track lanes. Dejen was promoted to the bronze medal, repeating his placing from the junior ranks three years previously.

Dejen improved his 3000 m best to 7:34.14 minutes at the XL Galan, but was a little slower at the 2012 IAAF World Indoor Championships, placing fifth in the event. He won the Carlsbad 5000 for a second year running in March 2012. Two 5000 m wins on the 2012 IAAF Diamond League circuit, including a personal best of 12:46.81 minutes, making him the fifth fastest ever over the distance at the time, and earning him selection for the 2012 Summer Olympics. At the Olympics in London, he was the fastest qualifier in winning his heat. In the final he chased Mo Farah over the final lap, but did not managed to catch the Briton and took the silver medal behind him. He ended the year with a fourth-place finish at the Weltklasse Zurich, finishing second in the Diamond League rankings after Isaiah Kiplangat Koech.

A third straight win at the Carlsbad race opened his outdoor season in 2013. At the 2013 World Championships in Athletics, Gebremeskel finished 16th in the 10,000 metres in a time of 27.51.88. In 2013, Gebremeskel held the world leading time for 10,000 metres of 26:51.02, which he set at the Folksam Grand Prix in Sollentuna, Sweden.

Capping off his 2014 indoor season, Gebremeskel scored a bronze medal in the 3000 metres with a time of 7:55.39 at the 2014 IAAF World Indoor Championships in Moscow, Russia. Gebremeskel went on to win his fourth straight Carlsbad 5000 race in 13:13, this time over American rival Bernard Lagat.

== Major competition record ==
Year	Competition	Venue	Position	Event	Notes
Representing Ethiopia
2008	World Junior Championships	Bydgoszcz, Poland	3rd	5000 m	13:11.97
2010	World Indoor Championships	Doha, Qatar	10th	3000 m	7:48.69
2011	World Championships	Daegu, South Korea	3rd	5000 m	13:23.92
2012	World Indoor Championships	Istanbul, Turkey	5th	3000 m	7:42.60
2012	Olympic Games	London, United Kingdom	2nd	5000 m	13:41.98
2013	World Championships	Moscow, Russia	16th	10,000 m	27:51.88
2014	World Indoor Championships	Sopot, Poland	3rd	3000 m	7:55.39
2016	Olympic Games	Rio de Janeiro, Brazil	12th	5000 m	13:15.91

== Personal bests ==
Outdoor

- 3000 metres – 7:51.02 min (2009)
- 5000 metres – 12:46.81 min (2012)
- 10000 metres – 26:51.02 min (2013)
- 5 kilometres (road) – 13:11 min (2011)
- 10 kilometres (road) – 27:45 min (2011)

Indoor

- 3000 metres – 7:34.14 min (2012)
- 5000 metres – 13:11.78 min (2010)
