= 2009 Asian Athletics Championships – Men's 5000 metres =

The men's 5000 metres event at the 2009 Asian Athletics Championships was held at the Guangdong Olympic Stadium on November 10.

== Results ==
Rank	Name	Nationality	Time	Notes
1st place, gold medalist(s)	James Kwalia	Qatar	14:02.90	
2nd place, silver medalist(s)	Ali Hasan Mahboob	Bahrain	14:03.44	
3rd place, bronze medalist(s)	Essa Ismail Rashed	Qatar	14:04.52	
4	Kensuke Takezawa	Japan	14:08.38	
5	Tian Mengxu	China	14:09.70	
6	Alemu Bekele Gebre	Bahrain	14:11.61	
7	Yang Dinghong	China	14:18.00	
8	Lee Du-haeng	South Korea	14:18.83	
9	Baek Seung-ho	South Korea	14:28.65	
10	Ho Chin-ping	Chinese Taipei	14:37.83	
11	Hari Kumar Rimal	Nepal	14:38.13	
12	Ser-Od Bat-Ochir	Mongolia	14:47.01	
13	Tserenpil Dembee	Mongolia	15:27.42	PB
	Ajmal Amirov	Tajikistan	DNF	
