= Athletics at the 2010 Asian Games – Men's 5000 metres =

2010 5000 metres event in Guangzhou, China

Men's 5000 metres at the 2010 Asian Games
- Venue: Aoti Main Stadium
- Date: 21 November 2010
- Competitors: 15 from 12 nations

Medalists
gold medal	Hasan Mahboob	Bahrain
silver medal	James Kwalia	Qatar
bronze medal	Felix Kibore	Qatar

The men's 5000 metres event at the 2010 Asian Games was held at the Aoti Main Stadium, Guangzhou, China on 21 November 2010.

== Schedule ==
All times are China Standard Time (UTC+08:00)

Date	Time	Event
Sunday, 21 November 2010	19:35	Final

== Records ==
Prior to this competition, the existing world, Asian and Games records were as follows.

World Record	Kenenisa Bekele (ETH)	12:37.35	Hengelo, Netherlands	31 May 2004
Asian Record	Saif Saaeed Shaheen (QAT)	12:51.98	Rome, Italy	14 July 2006
Games Record	Toshinari Takaoka (JPN)	13:38.37	Hiroshima, Japan	16 October 1994

== Results ==
Legend

- DNF — Did not finish

Rank	Athlete	Time	Notes
1st place, gold medalist(s)	Hasan Mahboob (BRN)	13:47.86	
2nd place, silver medalist(s)	James Kwalia (QAT)	13:48.55	
3rd place, bronze medalist(s)	Felix Kibore (QAT)	13:49.31	
4	Dejenee Regassa (BRN)	13:50.60	
5	Abdullah Al-Joud (KSA)	13:52.34	
6	Kensuke Takezawa (JPN)	13:54.11	
7	Baek Seung-ho (KOR)	13:56.18	
8	Sunil Kumar (IND)	14:01.76	
9	Yuki Matsuoka (JPN)	14:03.62	
10	Agus Prayogo (INA)	14:04.29	
11	Qais Al-Mahrooqi (OMA)	14:18.96	
12	Nader Al-Masri (PLE)	14:25.04	
13	Ho Chin-ping (TPE)	14:32.67	
14	Dambadarjaagiin Gantulga (MGL)	15:39.71	
—	Yerzhan Askarov (KGZ)	DNF	
