= Jillian Schwartz =

American-born pole vaulter (born 1979)

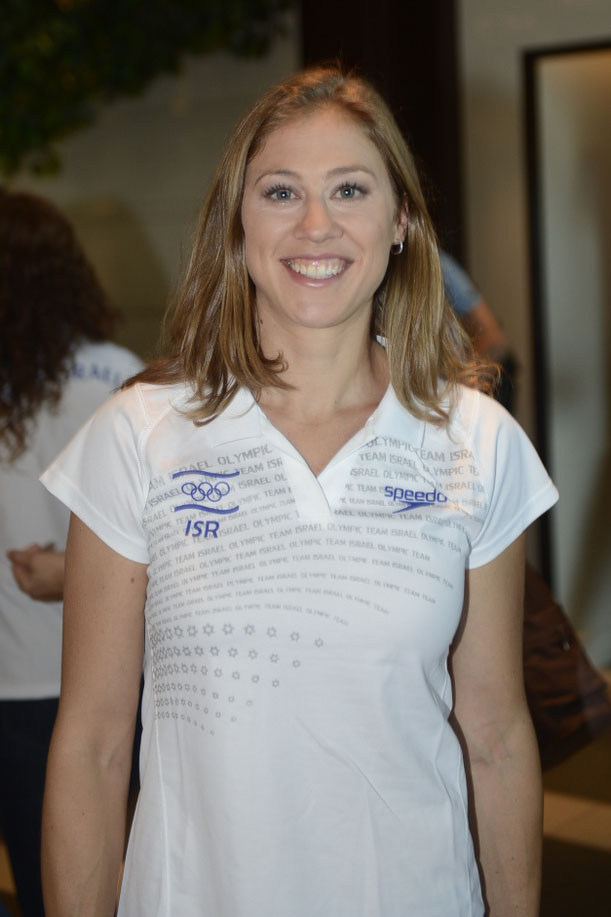
- Jillian Schwartz, 2012

Personal information
- Citizenship: United States (by birthplace), Israel (naturalized, 2010)
- Born: September 19, 1979 (age 46) Evanston, Illinois, United States
- Education: Duke University
- Years active: 1999–2012
- Height: 1.73 m (5 ft 8 in)
- Weight: 63 kg (139 lb)

Sport
- Country: Israel
- Sport: Track and field
- Event: pole vault
- College team: Duke Blue Devils
- Retired: 2012

Achievements and titles
- Personal best: 4.72 m
Medal record
Representing United States
Maccabiah Games
Women's athletics
Gold medal – first place	2009 Tel Aviv	Pole vault
- Updated on 20 February 2015

Jillian Dickinson (née Schwartz; born September 19, 1979) is an American-born female former pole vaulter who competed internationally for Israel. She represented the United States at the 2004 Summer Olympics and competed at five consecutive World Championships in Athletics from 2003 to 2011. Her best placing in international competition was fourth at the 2004 IAAF World Indoor Championships.

She competed at the NCAA Championships while at Duke University and gained All-America honours on three occasions. Although she never won at a USATF Championships event, she took the runner-up spot on three occasions at both the USA Outdoor and USA Indoor Championships. Her personal best mark is 4.72 m, set indoors in Jonesboro, Arkansas in 2008. After gaining Israeli citizenship in 2010, she set Israeli records of 4.60 m in the pole vault both outdoors and indoors and competed for Israel at the 2011 World Championships in Athletics and 2012 Summer Olympics.

== Career ==
=== Early life and college ===
Born in Evanston, Illinois, and Jewish, she was raised in Lake Forest. She wanted to take up pole vaulting at Lake Forest High School, but was not allowed as the girl's pole vault was not permitted in Illinois until 1997. She moved to Arkansas in order to train in the discipline. Schwartz attended Duke University and became the first woman to win an Eastern College Athletic Conference title for the Duke Blue Devils in 1999. The following year she won the Atlantic Coast Conference (ACC) pole vault title and came third at the NCAA Outdoor Track and Field Championship. She attended the United States Olympic Trials for the first time in 2000, but failed to register a height. In her final year at Duke, in 2001, she set university records of 4.10 m indoors and 4.32 m outdoors, as well as winning the ACC outdoor and indoor titles. She claimed second place at the NCAA Outdoors and signed with Nike that summer, deciding to turn professional.

=== Olympic and World Championship competition ===
She was the runner-up at the 2002 USA Indoor Track and Field Championships behind Mary Sauer and improved her outdoor best to 4.50 m. However, she only managed tenth place at the USA Outdoor Track and Field Championships that year. She placed sixth at the 2003 USA Indoors but rebounded with a second-place finish at the outdoor nationals. This gained her a place on the team for the 2003 World Championships in Athletics and she came eighth in the qualifying round of the vault. The 2004 season proved to be her breakthrough year as she was runner-up to Stacy Dragila at the USA Indoor Championships and then placed fourth at the 2004 IAAF World Indoor Championships, vaulting a personal best mark of 4.60 m. She achieved the same mark outdoors to take second at the Prefontaine Classic and was runner-up to Dragila at the 2004 Olympic Trials, securing her first Olympic berth. She cleared 4.30 m in the qualifying rounds of the 2004 Athens Olympics, but this was not enough to make the final.

Schwartz did not compete indoors in 2005 but managed to finish in the top three at the USA Outdoors. One of three Americans in the women's pole vault at the 2005 World Championships in Athletics (along with Dragila and Tracy O'Hara), she finished second in the qualifying but could not repeat her form in the final round, ending up in eleventh place. She became the Voluntary Assistant Coach for the Columbia University track and field team in 2008. She was the runner-up at both the national outdoor and indoor championships in 2006 and improved her best by a centimeter to 4.61 m in Jonesboro, Arkansas. She competed at the 2006 IAAF World Indoor Championships, but did not make it into the final on this occasion. She also made appearances on the 2006 IAAF Golden League circuit

Her progress stagnated in 2007 as she failed to clear higher than 4.50 m. Still, she took third place at the USA Outdoors and competed at the 2007 World Championships, where she achieved her season's best of 4.50 m in qualifying. She started 2008 with a big personal best indoors in Jonesboro, improving 12 cm with a clearance of 4.72 m. She was again the runner-up at the USA Indoors, this time behind Jennifer Stuczynski. At the 2008 IAAF World Indoor Championships in Valencia, Spain, she was eliminated once again at the qualifying stage. She set her sights on making the team for the 2008 Beijing Olympics and had podium finishes at the Reebok Grand Prix and the Adidas Track Classic. However, she came fourth at the 2008 United States Olympic Trials, being beaten by the less-established April Steiner Bennett and Erica Bartolina.

She came fourth at the 2009 USA Outdoor Championships, but was gifted a place at the 2009 World Championships in Athletics as the reigning US Champion Stuczynski withdrew due to injury. Schwartz vaulted 4.50 m at the championships in Berlin, just missing the qualifying mark by 5 cm.

=== Move to Israel ===
She competed at the 2009 Maccabiah Games in Israel and won the pole vault gold medal for the United States. Officials approached her about a possible move to compete for Israel and she agreed, seeing it as a better chance to participate at the 2012 London Olympics given the strong competition for a place in the United States.

She gained Israeli citizenship and switched nationality in preparation for the 2010 season. She set an Israeli record mark of 4.60 m indoors in Jonesboro in May 2010 and then set an outdoor record of 4.60 m to win at the Adidas Grand Prix Diamond League meet. She won her first national title at the Israeli Athletics Championships in June. Other performances that year included at win at the Vardinoyiannia and runner-up at the London Grand Prix Diamond League.

In the 2011 season she cleared 4.50 m early in the season and won at the 2011 European Team Championships 3rd League, but she did not reach higher as the year progressed, finishing second at the national championships and being eliminated in qualifying at the 2011 World Championships in Athletics. She opened 2012 with a win at the U.S. Open Track and Field in January in a season's best of 4.52 m. Again her early performances remained the best of the year, as she finished eleventh at both the 2012 IAAF World Indoor Championships and 2012 European Athletics Championships. She did, however, manage to win her second national title and make her Olympic debut for Israel at the 2012 London Games, competing in qualifying only. She retired from the sport after the Olympics.

During the 2024 Summer Olympics, Schwartz, now going by Jillian Dickinson and living in Westmoreland County, Pennsylvania, spoke to WPXI about how she would follow Bridget Williams' performance.

== International competitions ==
Year	Competition	Venue	Position	Notes
Representing United States
2003	World Championships	Paris, France	18th (q)	4.15 m
2004	World Indoor Championships	Budapest, Hungary	4th	4.60 m
2004	Olympic Games	Athens, Greece	17th (q)	4.30 m
2005	World Championships	Helsinki, Finland	11th	4.20 m
2006	World Indoor Championships	Moscow, Russia	10th (q)	4.35 m
2007	World Championships	Osaka, Japan	15th (q)	4.50 m
2008	World Indoor Championships	Valencia, Spain	11th (q)	4.35 m
2009	World Championships	Berlin, Germany	14th (q)	4.50 m
Representing Israel
2011	2011 European Team Championships 3rd League	Reykjavík, Iceland	1st	4.10 m
2011	World Championships	Daegu, South Korea	25th (q)	4.25 m
2012	World Indoor Championships	Istanbul, Turkey	11th	4.45 m
2012	European Championships	Helsinki, Finland	11th	4.10 m
2012	Olympic Games	London, United Kingdom	18th (q)	4.40 m

== National titles ==
- Israeli Athletics Championships
  - Pole vault: 2010, 2012

== See also ==
- List of Israeli records in athletics
- List of Maccabiah records in athletics
