= 2007 Asian Athletics Championships – Men's 10,000 metres =

The men's 10,000 metres event at the 2007 Asian Athletics Championships was held in Amman, Jordan on July 26.

== Results ==
Rank	Name	Nationality	Time	Notes
1st place, gold medalist(s)	Abdullah Ahmad Hassan	Qatar	29:45.95	
2nd place, silver medalist(s)	Ali Dawoud Sedam	Qatar	29:58.33	
3rd place, bronze medalist(s)	Ali Hasan Mahboob	Bahrain	30:05.12	
4	Ishaq Isa Abedeen	Bahrain	30:51.43	
5	Surendra Singh	India	31:05.68	
6	Santosh Kumar Patel	India	31:16.43	
7	Omid Mehrabi	Iran	31:19.54	
	Lee Du-haeng	South Korea	DNF	
	Omar Abusaid	Palestine	DNS	
	Mahmoud Yauser	Palestine	DNS	
	Mohammed Al-Juraid	Yemen	DNS	
