= 2005 World Championships in Athletics – Men's 5000 metres =

The 5000 metres at the 2005 World Championships in Athletics was held on August 11 and August 14 at the Helsinki Olympic Stadium.

== Medalists ==
Gold	Benjamin Limo; Kenya (KEN)
Silver	Sileshi Sihine; Ethiopia (ETH)
Bronze	Craig Mottram; Australia (AUS)

== Heats ==
August 11, 2005

=== Heat 1 ===
1. Isaac Kiprono Songok, Kenya 13:20.36 Q
2. Tariku Bekele, Ethiopia 13:20.66 Q
3. John Kibowen, Kenya 13:21.08 Q
4. Dejene Berhanu, Ethiopia 13:21.20 Q
5. James Kwalia C'Kurui, Qatar 13:21.36 q
6. Zersenay Tadese, Eritrea 13:22.36 q
7. Boniface Kiprop Toroitich, Uganda 13:22.44 q
8. Wilson Busienei, Uganda 13:25.36 (SB)
9. Alberto García, Spain 13:25.44
10. Ian Dobson, United States 13:27.16
11. Hicham Bellani, Morocco 13:29.44
12. Alejandro Suárez, Mexico 13:31.63 (SB)
13. Serhiy Lebid, Ukraine 13:43.50
14. Reid Coolsaet, Canada 13:53.15
15. Roberto García, Spain 13:59.50
16. Ryan Hall, United States 13:59.86
17. Eduardo Buenavista, Philippines 14:24.90
18. Michael Sanchez, Gibraltar 15:34.82
19. Mohammed Mostafa, Palestine 15:37.04

=== Heat 2 ===
1. Eliud Kipchoge, Kenya 13:12.86 Q
2. Craig Mottram, Australia 13:12.93 Q
3. Sileshi Sihine, Ethiopia 13:13.04 Q (SB)
4. Ali Saïdi-Sief, Algeria 13:13.50 Q (SB)
5. Benjamin Limo, Kenya 13:14.30 q
6. Fabiano Joseph Naasi, Tanzania 13:18.18 q (SB)
7. Moukheld Al-Outaibi, Saudi Arabia 13:20.06 q
8. Marius Bakken, Norway 13:22.00 q
9. Mohammed Mourhit, Belgium 13:22.87
10. Samson Kiflemariam, Eritrea 13:31.05 (SB)
11. Essa Ismail Rashed, Qatar 13:31.73
12. Moses Kipsiro, Uganda 13:32.25
13. Tim Broe, United States 13:51.17
14. Thiha Aung, Myanmar 14:33.69 (PB)
15. Francis Khanje, Malawi 14:51.49 (PB)
- Jesús España, Spain DQ
- Mohammed Amyn, Morocco DNF
- Abderrahim Goumri, Morocco DNF
- Günther Weidlinger, Austria DNF

== Final ==
August 14, 2005

1. Benjamin Limo, Kenya 13:32.55
2. Sileshi Sihine, Ethiopia 13:32.81
3. Craig Mottram, Australia 13:32.96
4. Eliud Kipchoge, Kenya 13:33.04
5. Ali Saïdi-Sief, Algeria 13:33.25
6. John Kibowen, Kenya 13:33.77
7. Tariku Bekele, Ethiopia 13:34.76
8. Dejene Berhanu, Ethiopia 13:34.98
9. Moukheld Al-Outaibi, Saudi Arabia 13:35.29
10. Isaac Kiprono Songok, Kenya 13:37.10
11. Boniface Kiprop Toroitich, Uganda 13:37.73
12. Marius Bakken, Norway 13:38.63
13. James Kwalia C'Kurui, Qatar 13:38.90
14. Zersenay Tadese, Eritrea 13:40.27
15. Fabiano Joseph Naasi, Tanzania 13:42.50
