= 2010 IAAF World Indoor Championships – Men's 3000 metres =

The men's 3000 metres at the 2010 IAAF World Indoor Championships was held at the ASPIRE Dome on 12 and 14 March.

== Medalists ==
Gold	Silver	Bronze
Bernard Lagat; United States	Sergio Sánchez; Spain	Sammy Alex Mutahi; Kenya

== Records ==
Standing records prior to the 2010 IAAF World Indoor Championships
World record	Daniel Komen (KEN)	7:24.90	Budapest, Hungary	6 February 1998
Championship record	Haile Gebrselassie (ETH)	7:34.71	Paris, France	9 March 1997
World Leading	Augustine Kiprono Choge (KEN)	7:31.75	Stockholm, Sweden	10 February 2010
African record	Daniel Komen (KEN)	7:24.90	Budapest, Hungary	6 February 1998
Asian record	Saif Saaeed Shaheen (QAT)	7:39.77	Pattaya, Thailand	11 February 2006
European record	Sergio Sánchez (ESP)	7:32.41	Valencia, Spain	13 February 2010
North and Central American and Caribbean record	Bernard Lagat (USA)	7:32.43	Birmingham, Great Britain	17 February 2007
Oceanian Record	Craig Mottram (AUS)	7:34.50	Boston, United States	26 January 2008
South American record	Jacinto Navarrete (COL)	7:49.46	Seville, Spain	10 March 1991

== Qualification standards ==
Indoor	Outdoor
7:54.00	7:44.00 or 13:19.00 (5000m)

== Schedule ==
Date	Time	Round
March 12, 2010	17:10	Heats
March 14, 2010	17:05	Final

== Results ==
=== Heats ===
Qualification: First 4 in each heat (Q) and the next 4 fastest (q) advance to the final.

Rank	Heat	Name	Nationality	Time	Notes
1	1	Augustine Kiprono Choge	Kenya	7:43.80	Q
2	1	Dejen Gebremeskel	Ethiopia	7:44.26	Q, PB
3	1	Sergio Sánchez	Spain	7:44.33	Q
4	1	James Kwalia	Qatar	7:44.61	Q, PB
5	1	Hais Welday	Eritrea	7:45.44	q, NR
6	1	Hicham Bellani	Morocco	7:50.46	q
7	2	Bernard Lagat	United States	7:59.99	Q, SB
8	2	Tariku Bekele	Ethiopia	8:00.29	Q
9	2	Sammy Alex Mutahi	Kenya	8:00.53	Q
10	2	Jesús España	Spain	8:00.65	Q
11	2	Galen Rupp	United States	8:00.90	q, SB
12	2	Essa Ismail Rashed	Qatar	8:01.08	q
13	2	Gezachw Yossef	Israel	8:03.62	SB
14	1	Hayle Ibrahimov	Azerbaijan	8:05.43	PB
15	2	Scott Overall	Great Britain	8:08.02	
16	1	Tareq Mubarak Taher	Bahrain	8:14.67	SB
17	1	Ion Luchianov	Moldova	8:15.91	SB
18	2	Marco Joseph	Tanzania	8:22.18	PB

=== Final ===
Rank	Name	Nationality	Time	Notes
Gold medal	Bernard Lagat	United States	7:37.97	SB
Silver medal	Sergio Sánchez	Spain	7:39.55	
Bronze medal	Sammy Alex Mutahi	Kenya	7:39.90	
4	Tariku Bekele	Ethiopia	7:40.10	
5	Galen Rupp	United States	7:42.40	PB
6	Jesús España	Spain	7:42.82	SB
7	Hicham Bellani	Morocco	7:44.15	
8	James Kwalia	Qatar	7:46.12	
9	Essa Ismail Rashed	Qatar	7:47.94	SB
10	Dejen Gebremeskel	Ethiopia	7:48.69	
11	Augustine Kiprono Choge	Kenya	7:53.42	
12	Hais Welday	Eritrea	8:04.10	
