= Nicholas Kemboi =

Nicholas Kemboi may refer to:

- Nicholas Kemboi (born 1983), Kenyan-born Qatari long-distance runner
- Nicholas Kiptanui Kemboi (born 1989), Kenyan middle distance runner
