= 2007 Asian Athletics Championships – Men's 5000 metres =

Athletic event held in Amman, Jordan on July 29

The men's 5000 metres event at the 2007 Asian Athletics Championships was held in Amman, Jordan on July 29.

== Results ==
Rank	Name	Nationality	Time	Notes
1st place, gold medalist(s)	Felix Kikwai Kibore	Qatar	14:07.12	
2nd place, silver medalist(s)	Ahmad Hassan Abdullah	Qatar	14:08.66	
3rd place, bronze medalist(s)	Ishaq Isa Abedeen	Bahrain	14:18.47	
4	Ali Hasan Mahboob	Bahrain	14:34.09	
5	Surendra Singh	India	14:34.90	
6	Omid Mehrabi	Iran	14:53.94	
7	Sunil Kumar	India	14:57.42	
8	Lee Du-haeng	South Korea	15:07.32	
9	Denis Bagrev	Kyrgyzstan	15:07.90	
	Yuri Chechun	Kyrgyzstan	DNF	
	Methkal Abu Drais	Jordan	DNF	
	Nader Al-Massri	Palestine	DNS	
	Mugahed Al-Omal	Yemen	DNS	
