= Changach =

Village in Kenya

Coordinates: 0°26′N 35°35′E

Changach is a village in the Keiyo District, Elgeyo-Marakwet County, Kenya. It was formerly in the Rift Valley Province. According to the 2019 census it has a population of 1384 living in 301 households.

== Economy ==
The highlands provide adequate rainfall for farming and agriculture which is the economic base of the residents of the Rift Valley. Tea from the highlands in the Kericho district enjoy a worldwide reputation, but horticulture is an important part of the district's economy and cattle raising is also practised to a large extent.

The full economic potential of the Rift Valley region is, however, far from fully exploited, though the current growth in population and improved education may change this in a near future. People in the province are still mostly rural, but urbanisation is gradually increasing; new cities and towns contain the rural-urban migration and, provided the right policies are instituted, the Rift Valley province will be able to emerge as a national economic and cultural hub.

It is the birthplace of Kenyan runner John Kibowen.
