= Carlsbad 5000 =

Road running event in Carlsbad, California

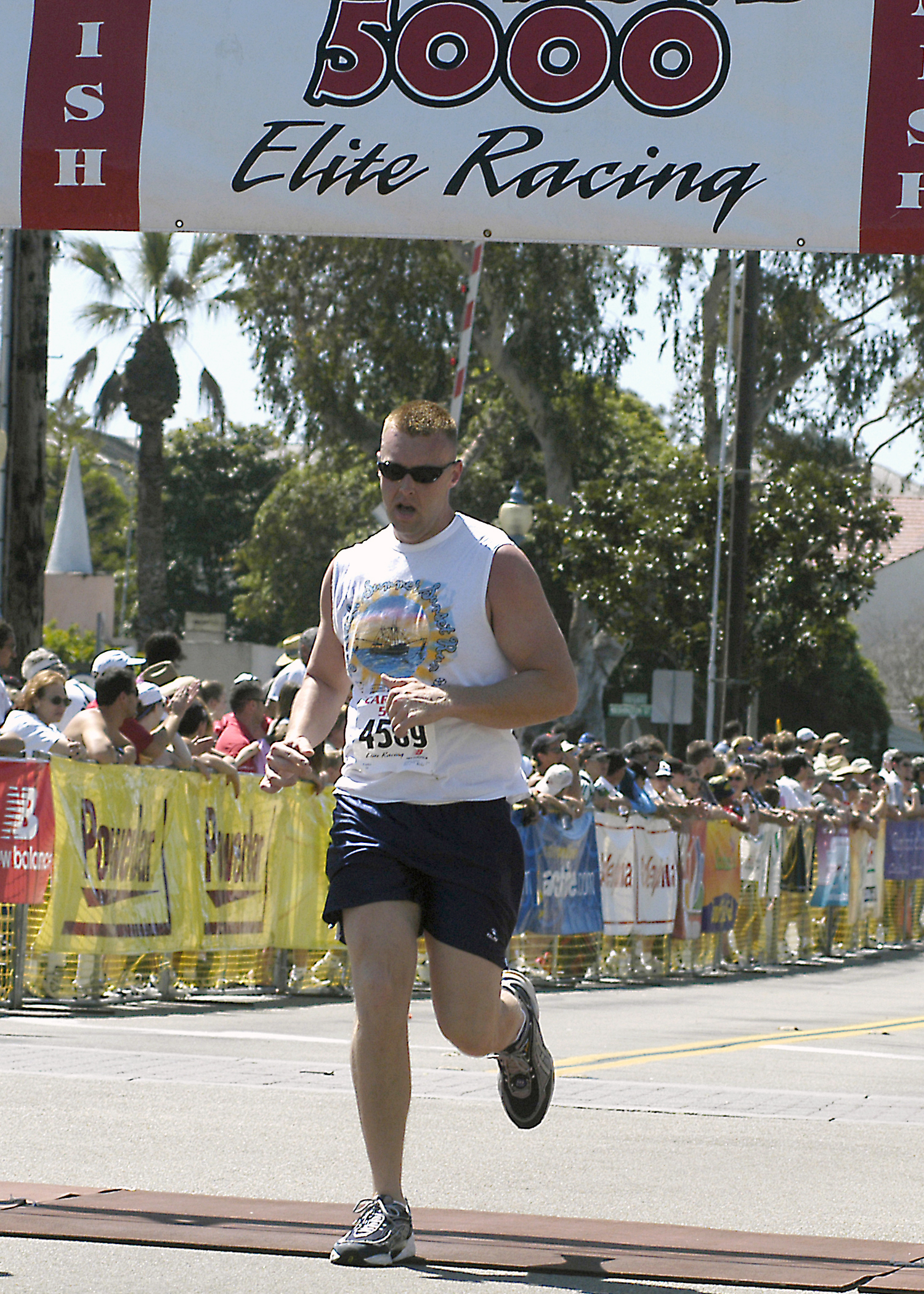
- A fun runner completing the race in 2004
- Date: April
- Location: Carlsbad, California, United States
- Event type: Road
- Distance: 5K
- Established: 1986 (40 years ago)
- Website: Carlsbad 5000

The Carlsbad 5000 is an annual five kilometer (3.1 mile) road running event that takes place each spring in the city of Carlsbad, California, along the north coast of San Diego County.

== Organization ==
The event is organized by Groundwork Endurance, a San Diego–based company which acquired the race in 2018 from World Triathlon Corporation. Headlining the Groundwork Endurance ownership team is US Olympian, Meb Keflezighi, the only runner in history to win the NYC Marathon, Boston Marathon, and an Olympic Marathon medal.

== Event overview ==
The event, which was first held in 1986, features seven 5k races, with participation in a specific race determined by each runners age and gender. The full day of running culminates with the men's and women's Skechers Performance Elite Invitationals, both of which feature professional fields competing for a substantial cash purse. In addition to the 5k races, there is a dedicated event for kids-only, the Junior Carlsbad, with distances ranging from a one mile fun run down to a diaper dash. The weekend also includes a free health and wellness expo, elite athlete Q&A, and post-race Pizza Port beer garden.

== Course ==
The 5k race course begins on Grand Avenue in downtown Carlsbad before following a south-to-north loop on Carlsbad Boulevard along the Pacific coast. The southern turnaround is near Tamarack Avenue and the northern turnaround is located near the Army and Navy Academy. The course returns south before making a final turn onto Carlsbad Village Drive for a downhill finish in Carlsbad Village. The course is sanctioned and certified by USA Track and Field, the governing body for the sport.

== Winners ==
The course records of 12:59.5 minutes for men (set by Sammy Kipketer in 2000) and 14:46 minutes for women (set by Meseret Defar in 2006) are the fastest times ever recorded for the 5 km road distance. These are recognized as world bests by the Association of Road Racing Statisticians. However, records for the road distance were not recognized by the IAAF until November 2017. In 2019, Kenyan Edward Cheserek won the men's elite invitational in a time of 13:29, which equalled the official IAAF record set earlier that same year. Cheserek returned to Carlsbad 5000 for his second consecutive win with a time of 13:44, one second away from second-place Reid Buchanan.

American Steve Scott not only helped design the course in 1986 but won the inaugural race en route to three straight victories. Other notable past winners include Eliud Kipchoge, Deena Kastor (Drossin), and Dejen Gebremeskel.

== Past winners ==
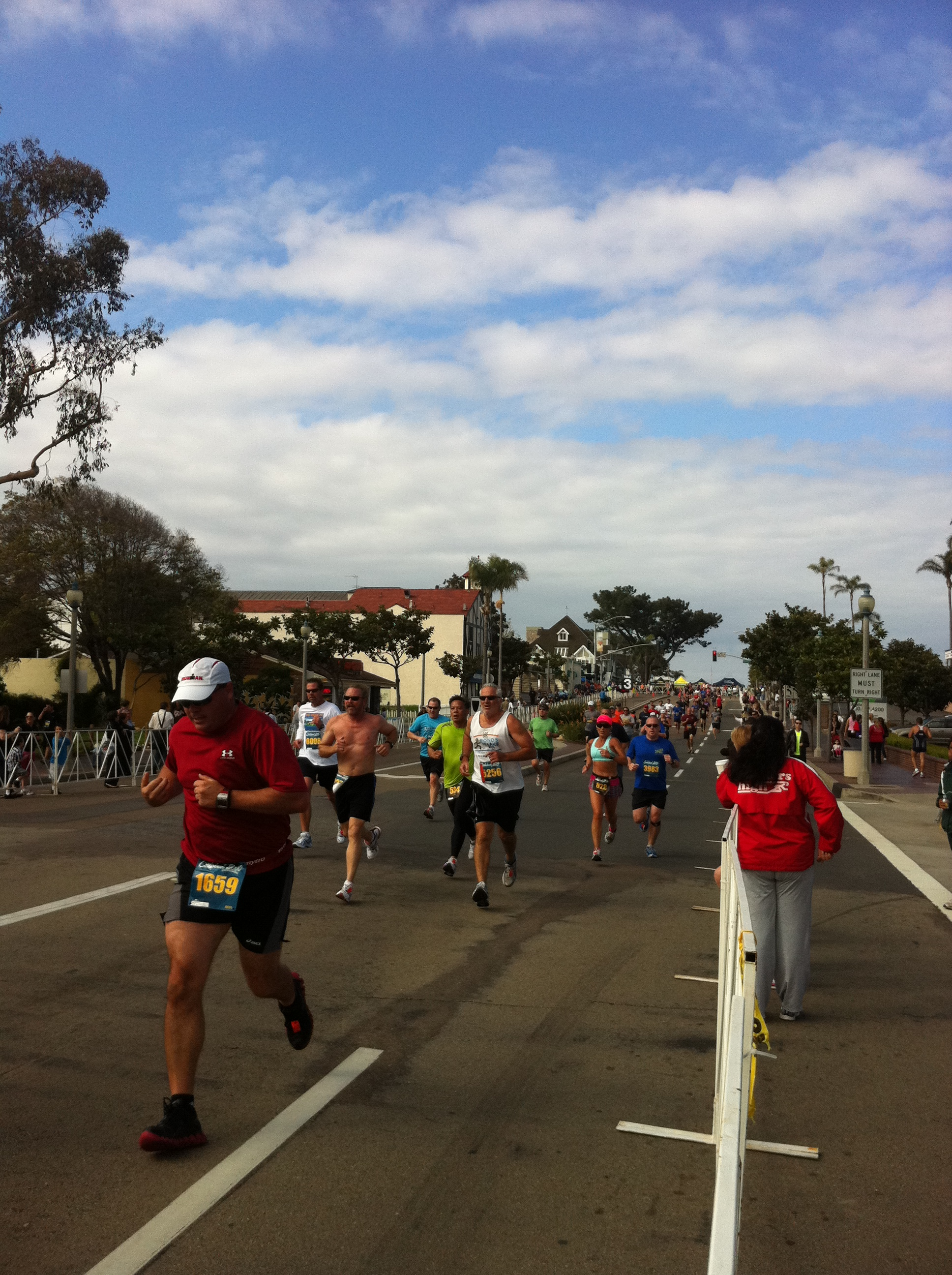
Amateurs running along Carlsbad Boulevard at the 2011 event.

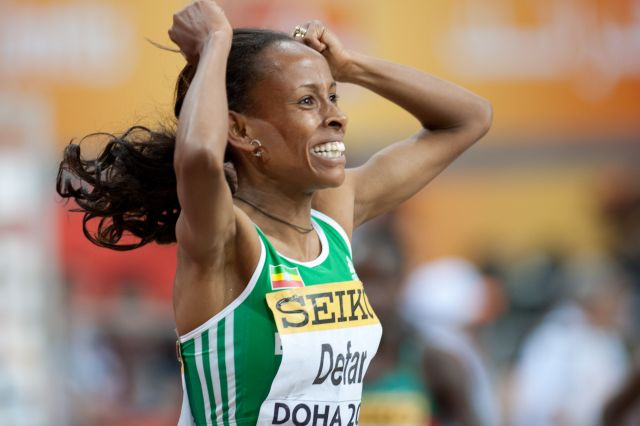
Ethiopian Meseret Defar is a four time winner and the current 5 km record holder.

Key: Course record

Edition	Year	Men's winner	Time (m:s)	Women's winner	Time (m:s)
1st	1986	Steve Scott (USA)	13:32	PattiSue Plumer (USA)	15:30.2
2nd	1987	Steve Scott (USA)	13:36	Lorraine Moller (NZL)	15:35
3rd	1988	Steve Scott (USA)	13:30.2	Liz McColgan (GBR)	15:29.7
4th	1989	Yobes Ondieki (KEN)	13:26	Lynn Williams (CAN)	15:20
5th	1990	Doug Padilla (USA)	13:30	Elly van Hulst (NED)	15:33
6th	1991	Frank O'Mara (IRL)	13:35	Liz McColgan (GBR)	15:11
7th	1992	William Mutwol (KEN)	13:12	Vicki Huber (USA)	15:14
8th	1993	Phillimon Hanneck (ZIM)	13:22	Shelly Steely (USA)	15:36
9th	1994	Josephat Machuka (KEN)	13:21	Colleen de Reuck (RSA)	15:20
10th	1995	Ismael Kirui (KEN)	13:17	Rose Cheruiyot (KEN)	15:05
11th	1996	Armando Quintanilla (MEX)	13:18	Angela Chalmers (CAN)	15:20
12th	1997	Paul Koech (KEN)	13:15	Sally Barsosio (KEN)	15:18
13th	1998	Paul Koech (KEN)	13:16	Naomi Mugo (KEN)	15:25
14th	1999	Armando Quintanilla (MEX)	13:33	Libbie Hickman (USA)	15:47
15th	2000	Sammy Kipketer (KEN)	12:59.5	Deena Drossin (USA)	15:08
16th	2001	Sammy Kipketer (KEN)	12:59.6	Sally Barsosio (KEN)	15:20
17th	2002	Sammy Kipketer (KEN)	13:17	Deena Drossin (USA)	14:53.8
18th	2003	Dejene Berhanu (ETH)	13:19	Berhane Adere (ETH)	14:53.6
19th	2004	Dejene Berhanu (ETH)	13:23	Isabella Ochichi (KEN)	14:53
20th	2005	Dejene Berhanu (ETH)	13:10	Tirunesh Dibaba (ETH)	14:51
21st	2006	Abreham Cherkos (ETH)	13:15	Meseret Defar (ETH)	14:46
22nd	2007	Simon Ndirangu Githuka (KEN)	13:28	Meseret Defar (ETH)	15:01
23rd	2008	Maregu Zewdie Tarefe (ETH)	13:34	Vivian Cheruiyot (KEN)	15:14
24th	2009	Bekana Daba (ETH)	13:19	Aheza Kiros (ETH)	15:38
25th	2010	Eliud Kipchoge (KEN)	13:11	Meseret Defar (ETH)	15:04
26th	2011	Dejen Gebremeskel (ETH)	13:11	Aheza Kiros (ETH)	15:13
27th	2012	Dejen Gebremeskel (ETH)	13:11	Tirunesh Dibaba (ETH)	15:01
28th	2013	Dejen Gebremeskel (ETH)	13:21	Gelete Burka (ETH)	15:26
29th	2014	Dejen Gebremeskel (ETH)	13:13	Julia Bleasdale (GBR)	15:06
30th	2015	Lawi Lalang (KEN)	13:32	Genzebe Dibaba (ETH)	14:48
31st	2016	Joshua Cheptegei (UGA)	13:24	Meseret Defar (ETH)	15:00
32nd	2017	Dejen Gebremeskel (ETH)	13:27	Viola Lagat (KEN)	15:35
33rd	2018	Kalle Berglund (SWE)	14:15	Emelia Gorecka (GBR)	16:04
34th	2019	Edward Cheserek (KEN)	13:29	Sharon Lokedi (KEN)	15:48
35th	2022	Edward Cheserek (KEN)	13:44	Biruktayit Degefa (ETH)	15:29
36th	2023	Edwin Kurgat (KEN)	13:50	Laura Galván (MEX)	15:05
37th	2024	Edwin Kurgat (KEN)	13:47	Laura Galván (MEX)	15:19
38th	2025	Sam Atkin (GBR)	13:24	Lemlem Hailu (ETH)	15:13
39th	2026	Drew Hunter (USA)	13:47	Simone Plourde (CAN)	15:30

== See also ==
- List of annual foot races in California
