= Felix Kibore =

Qatari long-distance runner

Personal information
- Nationality: Qatar
- Born: Felix Kikwai Kibore; 18 February 1988 (age 38) Kenya
- Height: 1.68 m (5 ft 6 in)
- Weight: 58 kg (128 lb)

Sport
- Sport: Athletics
- Event: Long-distance

Achievements and titles
- Personal best(s): 5000 m: 13:16.11; 10,000 m: 27:35.12
Medal record
Men's athletics
Representing Qatar
Asian Championships
Gold medal – first place	2007 Amman	5000 m

Felix Kikwai Kibore (Arabic: فيليكس كيبوري; born February 18, 1988, in Kenya) is a Qatari long-distance runner of Kenyan origin. Kibore represented Qatar at the 2008 Summer Olympics in Beijing, where he competed for the men's 10,000 metres, along with his compatriots Essa Ismail Rashed and Ahmad Hassan Abdullah. He finished the race in twenty-second place by nearly two seconds ahead of Spanish long-distance runners Carles Castillejo and Ayad Lamdassen, with a time of 28:11.92.

Kibore had also achieved his best result in long-distance running, when he finished ninth in the finals of the men's 5000 metres at the 2007 IAAF World Championships in Osaka, Japan.
