= Aheza Kiros =

Ethiopian long-distance runner

Aheza Kiros (born 16 October 1985 in Tigray) is an Ethiopian long-distance runner who specializes in the 10,000 metres.

She finished fourth at the 2006 African Championships and seventeenth at the 2007 World Championships. Running at the 2009 Adidas Track Classic, she beat Ejegayehu Dibaba in the 5000 metres in her first career sub-15 minutes performance of 14:56.33. She won the Carlsbad 5000 road race that year, but was runner up the following year to course record holder Meseret Defar. She was third at the 2010 Great Ethiopian Run in Addis Ababa, completing the course in 33:59 minutes.

The following March she made her debut over the half marathon and took third place in a time of 1:09:10 at the Paris Half Marathon. She had her second career win at the Carlsbad 5000 in April 2011, and was the runner-up at Freihofer's Run for Women that June. She was also runner-up at the New York Mini 10K, just edging ahead of fellow Ethiopian Belaynesh Zemedkun. In August she became the first Ethiopian woman to win at the Beach to Beacon 10K. She made her marathon debut at the Dubai Marathon and came 15th in a time of 2:33:21 hours. She was runner-up at the New York Mini 10K for a second year running in June. She was also runner-up at two Boston Athletic events, running a best of 31:57 minutes at the BAA 10K and taking second at the Boston Half Marathon.

Aheza made her marathon debut at the 2013 Dubai Marathon a claimed fourth place with her run of 2:24:30 hours.

== Personal bests ==
- 3000 metres - 8:51.16 min (2006)
- 5000 metres - 14:56.33 min (2009)
- 10,000 metres - 31:06.93 min (2008)
- Half marathon - 1:09:10 hrs (2011)
- Marathon - 2:24:30 hrs (2013)
