= John Kibowen =

Kenyan long-distance runner

Personal information
- Full name: John Kipkemboi Kemboi Kibowen
- Nationality: Kenya
- Born: April 21, 1969 (age 57) Changach, Keiyo District, Kenya
- Occupation: Long-distance runner
- Employer: Kenya Defence Forces

Sport
- Sport: Athletics
- Events: 1500 metres, 5000 metres, Cross country running
- Club: PACE Sports Management
- Turned pro: 1997

Achievements and titles
- Personal bests: 1500 m: 3:30.18 (1998); 3000 m: 7:29.09 (1998); 5000 m: 12:54.07 (2003); Marathon: 2:11:04 (2008)
Medal record
Men's athletics
Representing Kenya
World Championships
Bronze medal – third place	2001 Edmonton	5000 m
World Cross Country Championships
Gold medal – first place	1998 Marrakesh	Short race
Gold medal – first place	2000 Vilamoura	Short race
Silver medal – second place	2003 Lausanne	Short race

John Kipkemboi Kibowen (born 21 April 1969) is a Kenyan former long-distance runner who specialized in the 5000 metres and cross-country running. Kobowen is from Changach, Nandi. Kibowen trained with the PACE Sports Management training camp in Kaptagat.

== Career ==
=== Cross Country ===
Kibowen won the gold medal in the short race at the 1998 and 2000 IAAF World Cross Country Championships, and finished second in 2003.

=== 5000 metres ===
He won a bronze at the 2001 World Championships and a silver at the 31st IAAF World Cross Country Championships, finished fourth at the 2003 World Championships and sixth at the 2004 Summer Olympics and the 2005 World Championships.

=== 10000 metres ===
He won the Parelloop 10K in race in the Netherlands three times a row: 2003, 2004, 2005.
