= Marius Bakken =

Norwegian long-distance runner

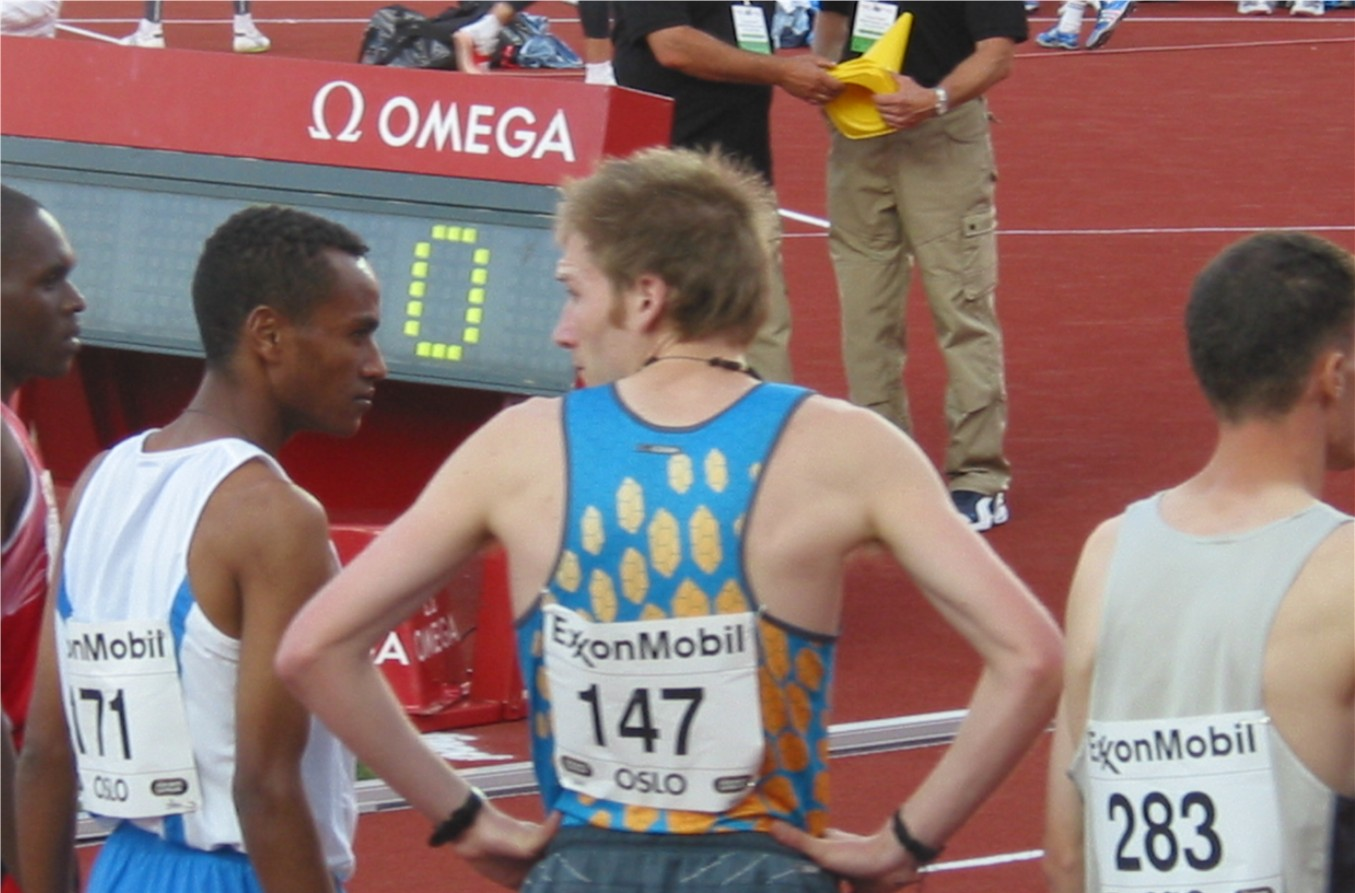
Bakken (147) at the Bislett Games in Oslo, July 29, 2005.

Marius Bakken (born March 27, 1978, in Sandefjord) is a Norwegian runner who specializes in the 5000 metres, having run distances from 800 to 10,000 metres in his early career. He represents IL Runar.

He finished ninth at the 2001 World Championships, fourteenth at the 2002 European Championships and twelfth at the 2005 World Championships. In addition he competed at the 1999 World Championships and the Olympic Games in 2000 and 2004 without success. He became Norwegian champion in 1500 m in 2001, 2003 and 2004 and in 5000 m in 2003 and 2005. Following a disappointing 2006 European Championships, Bakken announced his intentions to concentrate on medicine studies in 2007.

In high school, Marius was a foreign exchange student who ran for famed distance coach Joe Newton at York High School, Elmhurst, Illinois, US. In 1996 he won both the 1600 and 3200 races at the IL state track and field championships. His 1600m best at York (1996) was 4:09.2.

== Personal bests ==
- 800 metres - 1:51.19 min (1997)
- 1500 metres - 3:38.84 min (2005) - eighth among Norwegian 1500 m runners.
- 3000 metres - 7:40.77 (2001)
- 5000 metres - 13:06.39 (2004)
- 10,000 metres - 28:26.36 min (2000) - tenth among Norwegian 10,000 m runners.
