= Ishaq Isa Abedeen =

Bahraini runner

Medal record

Men's athletics

Representing Bahrain

Asian Championships
Bronze medal – third place	2007 Amman	5000 m

Ishaq Isa Abedeen (born 1 January 1988 in Kenya) is a Bahraini runner.

== Achievements ==
Year	Competition	Venue	Position	Event	Notes
Representing Bahrain
2005	World Cross Country Championships	Saint-Étienne, France	45th	Junior race	
2005	World Youth Championships	Marrakesh, Morocco	4th	3000 m	8:07.67
2006	Asian Indoor Championships	Pattaya, Thailand	5th	1500 m	3:51.19
2006	World Cross Country Championships	Fukuoka, Japan	38th	Junior race	
2007	Asian Championships	Amman, Jordan	3rd	5000 m	14:18.47
2007	Asian Championships	Amman, Jordan	4th	10,000 m	30:51.43
