= 2009 Asian Athletics Championships – Men's 10,000 metres =

Athletic event held in Guangdong on November 14

The men's 10,000 metres event at the 2009 Asian Athletics Championships was held at the Guangdong Olympic Stadium on November 14.

== Results ==
Rank	Name	Nationality	Time	Notes
1st place, gold medalist(s)	Ali Hasan Mahboob	Bahrain	28:23.70	
2nd place, silver medalist(s)	Nicholas Kemboi	Qatar	28:25.22	
3rd place, bronze medalist(s)	Ahmadh Abdullah	Qatar	28:28.38	
4	Yusei Nakao	Japan	28:40.89	
5	Dong Guojian	China	29:13.44	
6	Sunil Kumar	India	29:28.73	
7	Cheng Tao	China	29:38.74	
8	Lee Du-haeng	South Korea	29:40.02	SB
9	Ser-Od Bat-Ochir	Mongolia	29:43.79	PB
10	Julius Sermona	Philippines	30:16.91	PB
11	Baek Seung-ho	South Korea	31:00.00	
12	Tserenpil Dembee	Mongolia	31:12.07	
	Surendra Singh	India	DNS	
