= Hassan Chahdi =

French long-distance runner

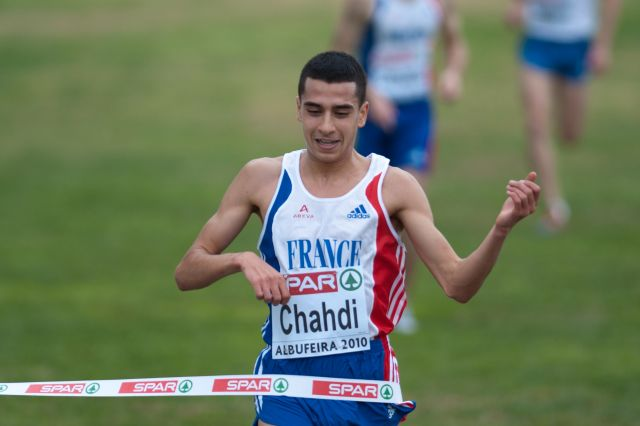
- Chahdi winning the European under-23 cross country title in 2010

Personal information
- Born: 7 May 1989 (age 37) Cluses, France
- Height: 1.69 m (5 ft 7 in)

Sport
- Country: France
- Sport: Athletics
- Event: Long-distance running

Sidi-Hassan Chahdi (born 7 May 1989) is a French long-distance runner who competes mainly in cross country running competitions.

Born in Cluses, he has represented France four times at the IAAF World Cross Country Championships, twice as a junior and twice as a senior athlete (2011 and 2015).

He has competed seven times consecutively at the European Cross Country Championships from 2007 to 2013. During this period he was part of the gold medal-winning French teams 2007, 2008, 2009 and 2011, gathering honours at junior, under-23 and senior level in the process. Individually, he was a junior bronze medallist in 2008, under-23 runner-up in 2009, under-23 champion in 2010, and then won his first senior medal (a silver) in 2012.

In 2018, he competed in the men's marathon at the 2018 European Athletics Championships held in Berlin, Germany. He did not finish his race.

== Personal life ==
Born in France, Chahdi is of Moroccan descent.

== International competitions ==
Year	Competition	Venue	Position	Event	Notes
2007	World Cross Country Championships	Mombasa, Kenya	61st	Junior race	27:20
2007	European Cross Country Championships	Toro, Spain	8th	Junior race	20:25
2007	European Cross Country Championships	Toro, Spain	1st	Junior team	29 pts
2008	World Cross Country Championships	Edinburgh, United Kingdom	23rd	Junior race	24:04
2008	World Cross Country Championships	Edinburgh, United Kingdom	11th	Junior team	248 pts
2008	World Junior Championships	Bydgoszcz, Poland	10th	5000 m	13:51.45
2008	European Cross Country Championships	Brussels, Belgium	3rd	Junior race	18:49
2008	European Cross Country Championships	Brussels, Belgium	1st	Junior team	50 pts
2009	European U23 Championships	Kaunas, Lithuania	16th	5000 m	14:21.76
2009	European Cross Country Championships	Dublin, Ireland	2nd	Under-23 race	25:17
2009	European Cross Country Championships	Dublin, Ireland	1st	Under-23 team	31 pts
2010	European Cross Country Championships	Albufeira, Portugal	1st	Under-23 race	24:11
2010	European Cross Country Championships	Albufeira, Portugal	2nd	Under-23 team	78 pts
2011	World Cross Country Championships	Punta Umbría, Spain	23rd	Senior race	35:35
2011	European Cross Country Championships	Velenje, Slovenia	4th	Senior race	29:22
2011	European Cross Country Championships	Velenje, Slovenia	1st	Senior team	34 pts
2012	European Cross Country Championships	Szentendre, Hungary	2nd	Senior race	30:11
2012	European Cross Country Championships	Szentendre, Hungary	4th	Senior team	86 pts
2013	European Cross Country Championships	Belgrade, Serbia	5th	Senior race	29:40
2013	European Cross Country Championships	Belgrade, Serbia	4th	Senior team	66 pts
2015	World Cross Country Championships	Guiyang, China	—	Senior race	DNF
2021	Olympic Games	Sapporo, Japan	45th	Marathon	2:18:40
2022	World Championships	Eugene, United States	17th	Marathon	2:09:20
2023	Boston Marathon	Boston, United States	8th	Marathon	2:09:46
2023	World Championships	Budapest, Hungary	7th	Marathon	2:10:45
2026	European Championships	Birmingham, United Kingdom	19th	Marathon	2:12:04
