= 2008 IAAF World Indoor Championships – Men's 3000 metres =

== Medalists ==
Gold
Tariku Bekele	Ethiopia
Silver
Paul Kipsiele Koech	Kenya
Bronze
Abreham Cherkos	Ethiopia

== Heats ==
Heat	Pos	Name	Country	Mark	Q
1	1	Edwin Cheruiyot Soi	Kenya	8:03.54	Q
1	2	Tariku Bekele	Ethiopia	8:03.55	Q
1	3	Mo Farah	United Kingdom	8:04.65	Q
1	4	Sergio Sánchez	Spain	8:04.71	Q
1	5	Cosimo Caliandro	Italy	8:04.80	
1	6	Sultan Khamis Zama	Qatar	8:05.61	
1	7	Chris Solinsky	United States	8:06.29	
1	8	Javier Carriqueo	Argentina	8:12.40	
1	9	David Galván	Mexico	8:28.29 PB	
1		Mohammed Salama	Palestine	DNS	
1		Dickson Marwa	Tanzania	DNS	
2	1	Paul Kipsiele Koech	Kenya	7:54.46	Q
2	2	Abreham Cherkos	Ethiopia	7:54.51	Q
2	3	Craig Mottram	Australia	7:55.27	Q
2	4	Ali Maataoui	Morocco	7:56.26	Q
2	5	James Kwalia C'Kurui	Qatar	7:58.13	q
2	6	Jonathon Riley	United States	7:59.22 SB	q
2	7	Arne Gabius	Germany	7:59.48	q
2	8	Kamal Boulahfane	Algeria	7:59.88	q
2	9	Nick McCormick	United Kingdom	8:00.01	
2	10	Sylvain Rukundo	Rwanda	8:02.49 PB	
2	11	Audace Baguma	Burundi	8:10.56 PB	

== Final ==
Pos	Name	Country	Mark
Gold medal	Tariku Bekele	Ethiopia	7:48.23
Silver medal	Paul Kipsiele Koech	Kenya	7:49.05
Bronze medal	Abreham Cherkos	Ethiopia	7:49.96
4	Edwin Cheruiyot Soi	Kenya	7:51.60
5	Craig Mottram	Australia	7:52.42
6	Mo Farah	United Kingdom	7:55.08
7	Ali Maataoui	Morocco	7:58.93
8	Sergio Sánchez	Spain	7:59.74 PB
9	James Kwalia C'Kurui	Qatar	8:00.44
10	Kamal Boulahfane	Algeria	8:04.73
11	Jonathon Riley	United States	8:05.59
12	Arne Gabius	Germany	8:11.21

Intermediate	Athlete	Country	Mark
1000m	Arne Gabius	Germany	2:48.58
2000m	Paul Kipsiele Koech	Kenya	5:25.71
