= Sammy Alex Mutahi =

Kenyan long-distance runner (born 1989)

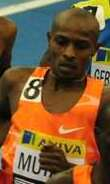
- Mutahi in 2010

Personal information
- Born: 1 June 1989 (age 37)
Medal record
Men's athletics
Representing Kenya
World Indoor Championships
Bronze medal – third place	2010 Doha	3000 m

Sammy Alex Mutahi (born 1 June 1989) is a Kenyan long-distance runner who specializes in the 5000 metres.

He finished third at the 2009 World Athletics Final.

His personal best times are 7:31.41 minutes in the 3000 metres, achieved in September 2009 in Rieti; 13:00.12 minutes in the 5000 metres, achieved in May 2010 in Rome; and 27:12.42 minutes in the 10,000 metres, achieved in September 2009 in Tokamachi. He has an indoor 3000 metres personal best of 7:32.02, achieved in Stockholm on 10 February 2010, which ranks Mutahi as #8 all-time.
