= U.S. Open Track and Field =

2012 US athletics tournament

U.S. Open Track and Field was the name of the first top level indoor track and field meet in 2012. The U.S. Open was the opening competition in the 2012 IAAF Indoor Permit Meeting series and was also part of the Visa Championship Series. Held in Madison Square Garden in New York City, the inaugural event was announced for January 28, 2012, with television coverage on January 29 at 7 p.m. Eastern Time on ESPN2.

Announced as continuation of a 99-year indoor track and field tradition at Madison Square Garden, the meet displaced the Millrose Games, which has been the longest standing annual event at the arena for the previous 98 years. The Millrose Games will continue at the Fort Washington Avenue Armory.

The event lasted just one year, and was cancelled in 2013.

== Meet records ==
=== Men ===
Men's meeting records of the U.S. Open Track and Field
Event	Record	Athlete	Nationality	Date	Ref.
50 m	5.64	Asafa Powell	Jamaica	28 January 2012	
600 y	1:11.20	Renny Quow	Trinidad and Tobago	28 January 2012	
Mile	4:00.65	Silas Kiplagat	Kenya	28 January 2012	
50 m hurdles	6.45	Terrence Trammell	United States	28 January 2012	
High jump	2.29 m	Jesse Williams	United States	28 January 2012	
Shot put	21.16 m	Ryan Whiting	United States	28 January 2012	
Sprint medley relay	3:28.04	Garden State TC	United States	28 January 2012	

=== Women ===
Women's meeting records of the U.S. Open Track and Field
Event	Record	Athlete	Nationality	Date	Ref.
50 m	6.08	Veronica Campbell-Brown	Jamaica	28 January 2012	
500 y	1:03.74	Keshia Baker	United States	28 January 2012	
800 m	2:07.54	Fantu Magiso	Ethiopia	28 January 2012	
Mile	4:34.62	Brenda Martinez	United States	28 January 2012	
50 m hurdles	6.78	Lolo Jones	United States	28 January 2012	
Pole vault	4.52 m	Jillian Schwartz	Israel	28 January 2012	
