= Sergio Sánchez (runner) =

Spanish long-distance runner

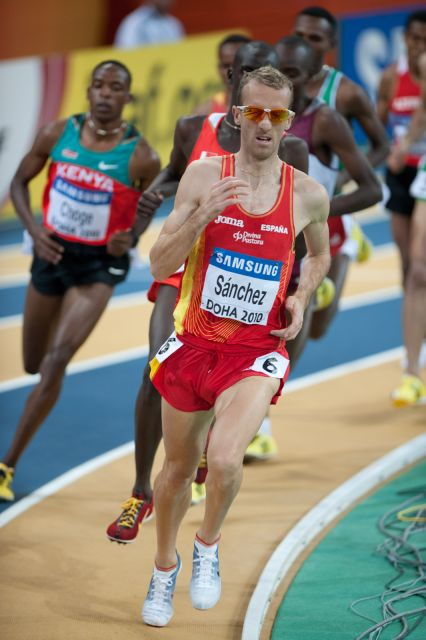
- Sánchez at the 2010 World Indoor Championships

Medal record

Men's athletics

Representing Spain

World Indoor Championships
Silver medal – second place	2010 Doha	3000 m

Sergio Sánchez (born 1 October 1982 in La Pola de Gordón) is a Spanish long-distance runner who specializes in the 5000 metres.

He finished sixteenth at the 1999 World Youth Championships and eighth at the 2008 World Indoor Championships, both in the 3000 metres. He also won a bronze medal at the European Athletics Indoor Cup that year.

At the 2009 World Championships in Athletics he ran in the 5000 m but did not progress beyond the heats stage. A fourth-place finish at the 2009 European Cross Country Championships earned him a team gold medal alongside the Spanish men. He was a surprise winner of the 2009 Cross Internacional de Venta de Baños, beating the reigning European champion Alemayehu Bezabeh.

In early 2010 he ran a Spanish record in the 2000 m and then set a European indoor record over 3000 m (7:32.41 mins). He went on to take a silver medal at the 2010 IAAF World Indoor Championships behind Bernard Lagat. He reached the final race of the 5000 metres at the 2010 European Athletics Championships in Barcelona, but did not manage to finish the race on home soil. He was the top-performing European at the Cross de la Constitución in December, taking fourth place. In June 2013 he took the European Cup 10000m title, with a time of 28:31.75, after battling Turkey's Halil Akkaş and overtaking him by 0.07 seconds.

On September 12, 2013 he was identified as having failed a drug test that was taken during the Spain Athletics Championships held in July 2013.

== Personal bests ==
- 1500 metres - 3:39.79 min (2004)
- 3000 metres - 7:45.51 min (2009)
- 5000 metres - 13:19.21 min (2010)
- 10000 metres - 28:25.22 min (2010)
- 1500 metres (indoor) - 3:40.63 min (2008)
- 2000 metres (indoor) - 4:52.90 min (2010)
- 3000 metres (indoor) - 7:32.41 min (2010)

Records
Preceded by Alberto García	Men's 3000 m European Indoor Record Holder; February 13, 2010 –	Succeeded by Incumbent
