= Dong Guojian =

Chinese long-distance runner

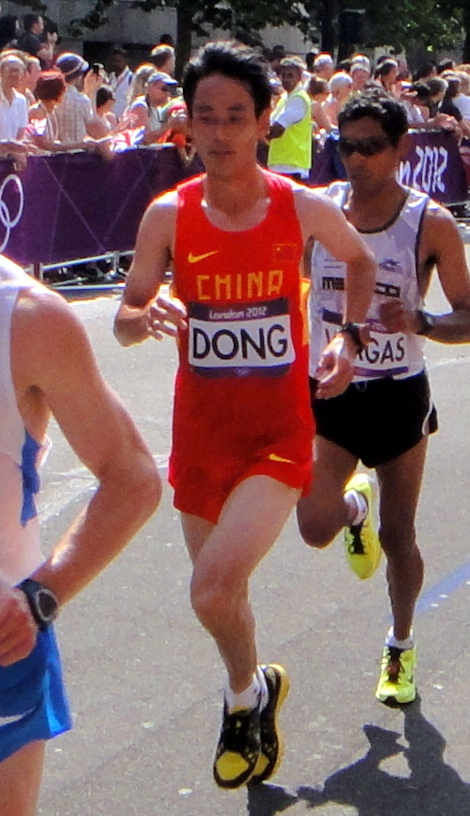

Personal information
- Born: March 16, 1987 (age 39) Luquan, Yunnan, China
- Height: 1.70 m (5 ft 7 in)
- Weight: 53 kg (117 lb)

Sport
- Country: China
- Sport: Athletics
- Event: Marathon

Achievements and titles
- Personal bests: 10,000 m: 28:17.60 (Jinan 2009); Marathon: 2:08:12 (Osaka 2024)

Dong Guojian (simplified Chinese: 董国建; traditional Chinese: 董國建; pinyin: Dǒng Guójiàn; born March 16, 1987, in Luquan County, Yunnan) is a Chinese long-distance runner who competes in the marathon. He competed at the 2012, 2016 and 2020 Summer Olympics.

Dong was born into a family of farmers in Jiaopingdu Township 皎平渡镇 in the hills of rural Luquan County, Yunnan, where the elevation is about 2,300 metres above sea level.

In 2016, Dong Guojian ran at the Chongqing International Marathon with a personal best of 2:11:41. Dong currently holds the Chinese half marathon record with a time of 1:02:51 in 2009.

He finished seventh in the 2019 Berlin Marathon at 02:08:28 and tenth in the 2022 Chicago Marathon, clocking a time of 2:08:53.

== Statistics ==
=== International competition ===
Year	Competition	Venue	Position	Event	Notes
Representing China
2009	Asian Championships	Guangzhou, China	5th	10000 m	29:13.44
2009	Yangzhou Half Marathon	Yangzhou, China	3rd	Half Marathon	1:02:51
2010	Dalian Marathon	Dalian, China	4th	Marathon	2:13:23
2010	Asian Games	Guangzhou, China	4th	Marathon	2:14:48
2011	World Championships	Daegu, South Korea	14th	Marathon	2:15:45
2012	Olympic Games	London, United Kingdom	54th	Marathon	2:20:39
2013	World Cross Country Championships	Bydgoszcz, Poland	95th	12 km	39:38
2016	Chongqing Marathon	Chonqing, China	2nd	Marathon	2:11:44
2016	Olympic Games	Rio de Janeiro, Brazil	29th	Marathon	2:15:32
2018	Asian Games	Jakarta, Indonesia	7th	Marathon	2:23:55
2019	Wuhan Marathon	Wuhan, China	4th	Marathon	2:12:34
2019	Berlin Marathon	Berlin, Germany	7th	Marathon	2:08:28
2019	Guangzhou Marathon	Guangzhou, China	4th	Marathon	2:09:00
2020	Macau Marathon	Macau, China	1st	Marathon	2:12:59
2021	Xuzhou Marathon	Xuzhou, China	3rd	Marathon	2:11:20
2021	Olympic Games	Sapporo, Japan	56th	Marathon	2:21:35
2022	World Championships	Eugene, Oregon, United States	23rd	Marathon	2:11:14
2022	Chicago Marathon	Chicago, United States	10th	Marathon	2:08:53
2023	Seoul Marathon	Seoul, South Korea	8th	Marathon	2:09:29
2023	Xi'an Marathon	Xi'an, China	1st	Marathon	2:10:44
2023	Hefei Marathon	Hefei, China	1st	Marathon	2:10:16
2024	Xiamen Marathon	Xiamen, China	6th	Marathon	2:10:38
2024	Osaka Marathon	Osaka, Japan	14th	Marathon	2:08:12
2024	Wuxi Marathon	Wuxi, China	13th	Marathon	2:10:39
2024	Nanjing Marathon	Nanjing, China	5th	Marathon	2:11:41
2025	Xiamen Marathon	Xiamen, China	13th	Marathon	2:13:04
2025	Wuxi Marathon	Wuxi, China	11th	Marathon	2:10:59

== See also ==
- China at the 2012 Summer Olympics – Athletics
  - Athletics at the 2012 Summer Olympics – Men's marathon
- China at the 2016 Summer Olympics – Athletics
  - Athletics at the 2016 Summer Olympics – Men's marathon
- China at the 2020 Summer Olympics – Athletics
  - Athletics at the 2020 Summer Olympics – Men's marathon
