= 2008 World Junior Championships in Athletics – Men's 5000 metres =

The men's 5000 metres event at the 2008 World Junior Championships in Athletics was held in Bydgoszcz, Poland, at Zawisza Stadium on 13 July.

== Medalists ==
Gold	Abreham Cherkos; Ethiopia
Silver	Mathew Kisorio; Kenya
Bronze	Degen Gebremskel; Ethiopia

== Results ==
=== Final ===
13 July

Rank	Name	Nationality	Time	Notes
1st place, gold medalist(s)	Abreham Cherkos	Ethiopia	13:08.57	
2nd place, silver medalist(s)	Mathew Kisorio	Kenya	13:11.57	
3rd place, bronze medalist(s)	Degen Gebremskel	Ethiopia	13:11.97	
4	Geoffrey Kusuro	Uganda	13:31.80	
5	Tony Wamulwa	Zambia	13:33.09	
6	Vincent Yator	Kenya	13:35.67	
7	Abraham Kiplimo	Uganda	13:41.89	
8	Pascal Sarwat	Tanzania	13:50.29	
9	Adil Rached	Morocco	13:51.45	
10	Hassan Chahdi	France	13:51.45	
11	Matt Centrowitz	United States	13:58.31	
12	Akinobu Murasawa	Japan	13:58.87	
13	Ryan Gregson	Australia	14:01.66	
14	Sondre Moen	Norway	14:02.95	
15	Charles Koech	Qatar	14:13.53	
16	Ryan Collins	United States	14:30.16	

== Participation ==
According to an unofficial count, 16 athletes from 12 countries participated in the event.

- Australia (1)
- Ethiopia (2)
- France (1)
- Japan (1)
- Kenya (2)
- Morocco (1)
- Norway (1)
- Qatar (1)
- Tanzania (1)
- Uganda (2)
- United States (2)
- Zambia (1)
