= Ahmad Hassan Abdullah =

Qatari-Kenyan long-distance runner

Medal record

Men's athletics

Representing Qatar

World Cross Country Championships
Bronze medal – third place	2005 St Etienne	Long race

World Half Marathon Championships
Bronze medal – third place	2004 New Delhi	Half marathon
Bronze medal – third place	2008 Rio de Janeiro	Half marathon

Asian Championships
Gold medal – first place	2003 Manila	10,000 m
Gold medal – first place	2007 Amman	10,000 m
Silver medal – second place	2007 Amman	5000 m
Bronze medal – third place	2009 Guangzhou	10,000 m

Ahmad Hassan Abdullah (Arabic: عبد الله أحمد حسن, born Albert Chepkurui on July 29, 1981 in Kaptarakwa, Kenya) is a long-distance and cross country runner, now representing Qatar after his switch from Kenya in 2003. Other runners who have made the same switch include Saif Saeed Shaheen.

Abdullah has won bronze medals at the 2005 IAAF World Cross Country Championships and the 2004 and 2008 editions of the IAAF World Half Marathon Championships. He represented Qatar over 10,000 metres at the 2008 Beijing Olympics and three times at the IAAF World Championships in Athletics. He is a two-time Asian champion in the 10,000 m (2003 and 2007) and holds the Asian record with his personal best time of 26:38.76 minutes.

== Career ==
Abdullah has competed numerous times at the IAAF World Cross Country Championships. He made his first appearance as a junior athlete at the 1999 race, finishing in fifth place. In the senior section, he was sixth in the 2001 short race and 2002 long race, before missing 2003 amid his switch to represent Qatar. He returned in 2004 to take fourth in the short race. In 2005 he race in both races and was the long race bronze medallist and eighth in the short race. He performed less well after that, with finishes ranging from eighth to 18th in the period from 2006 to 2010.

He has enjoyed success at the Asian Cross Country Championships, winning the individual and team gold medals at the 2007 and 2009 competitions. He won both the individual and team titles at the 2008 edition of the World Military Cross Country Championships. He has competed on the Spanish cross country circuit and won the Cross Zornotza in 2005.

On the track Abdullah has typically competed in the 10,000 m. He holds the Asian and Qatari records for the distance with his personal best of 26:38.76 minutes, set at the Memorial Van Damme meeting in 2003. He was the bronze medallist in the event at the 2001 Goodwill Games, In his first outings as a Qatari athlete he came fourth in the 10,000 m at the 2003 World Championships in Athletics, before taking the regional title in the event at the 2003 Asian Athletics Championships. At the 2007 Asian Athletics Championships, he won a second Asian title and also a silver medal over 5000 metres behind his compatriot Felix Kibore. He ran at the 2007 World Championships in Athletics, but did not manage to finish. On his Olympic debut at the 2008 Beijing Olympics he came eighth in the 10,000 m and was the only runner in the top ten to represent a non-African nation. He was eleventh at the 2009 World Championships in Athletics, then was only a bronze medallist at the 2009 Asian Athletics Championships, as he was beaten by two other former Kenyans, Nicholas Kemboi and Hasan Mahboob.

At the IAAF World Half Marathon Championships he has competed three times and reached the podium twice. He was third in 2004, 24th in 2007 and took a second bronze medal at the 2008 race. On the road circuit, he was the 2003 winner of the Bellin Run.

After a break from international competition lasting from late 2010 through 2011, Abdullah made his marathon debut in 2012 at the Hamburg Marathon and finished the race in a time of 2:08:36 hours, coming fifth overall.

== International competitions ==
Year	Competition	Venue	Position	Event	Notes
Representing Kenya
2001	World Cross Country Championships	Ostend, Belgium	6th	Short race	
2002	World Cross Country Championships	Dublin, Ireland	6th	Long race	
2002	World Cross Country Championships	Dublin, Ireland	1st	Team competition	
Representing Qatar
2003	World Championships	Paris, France	4th	10,000 m	27:18.28
2003	World Athletics Final	Monte Carlo, Monaco	10th	5000 m	
2004	World Cross Country Championships	Brussels, Belgium	4th	Short race	
2004	World Cross Country Championships	Brussels, Belgium	2nd	Team competition	
2004	World Half Marathon Championships	New Delhi, India	3rd	Half marathon	
2004	World Athletics Final	Monte Carlo, Monaco	6th	5000 m	
2005	World Cross Country Championships	Saint-Étienne, France	3rd	Long race	
2005	World Cross Country Championships	Saint-Étienne, France	3rd	Team competition	
2005	World Cross Country Championships	Saint-Étienne, France	8th	Short race	
2005	World Cross Country Championships	Saint-Étienne, France	3rd	Team competition	
2006	World Cross Country Championships	Fukuoka, Japan	14th	Long race	
2006	World Cross Country Championships	Fukuoka, Japan	6th	Team competition	
2007	Asian Championships	Amman, Jordan	2nd	5000 m	14:08.66
2007	Asian Championships	Amman, Jordan	1st	10,000 m	29:45.95
2007	Pan Arab Games	Cairo, Egypt	6th	5000 m	13:46.45
2007	Pan Arab Games	Cairo, Egypt	5th	10,000 m	29:35.90

== Personal bests ==
- 3000 metres - 7:43.01 min (1999)
- 5000 metres - 12:56.27 min (2003)
- 10,000 metres - 26:38.76 min (2003)
- Half marathon - 1:01:46 hrs (2007)
- Marathon - 2:08:36 hrs (2012)

== See also ==
- List of eligibility transfers in athletics
