= Adidas Track Classic =

Track and field athletics meeting in California, US

The Adidas Track Classic is an American track and field athletics meeting which has taken place annually in Carson, California, since 2005. The meeting forms part of the USA Track & Field Visa Championship Series and is also one of the few area meetings where athletes can earn points to qualify for the World Athletics Final. The event has its roots in the Oregon Track Classic, which was sponsored by Adidas until 2005 and was forced to close that year due to lack of funding.

Top athletes from the North America, Central America and Caribbean (NACAC) area compete at the event and a number of national and area records have been set at previous editions. The event is usually held in mid-May at The Home Depot Center, part of the Adidas Performance Institute. Athletes who are part of the Adidas track team often feature prominently and World Champions and Olympic medalists often participate in the event. The competition is broadcast on television in the United States.

== Previous editions ==
After winning the 100 metres at the 2004 edition, Olympic Gold Medalist Maurice Greene walked back to the finish line and took off his shoes as if they were on fire. As part of the planned stunt Allen Johnson rushed onto the track with a real fire extinguisher to put out the shoes, in one of the more famous showboating incidents.

At the 2008 Adidas Track Classic Tyson Gay won both the 100 and 200 meters races, while Megan Metcalfe and Ethiopian Ali Abdosh set world leading times in the 3000 and 5000 meters respectively. Shannon Rowbury won the 1500 meters with the fastest time by an American woman in five years and Jeremy Wariner set the 400 meters meeting record.

In the 2009 edition Anna Willard ran the fastest 3000 meters steeplechase to have been run in the United States and Hazel Clark set a new track record in the 800 metres. LaShawn Merritt, Jenn Stuczynski aka Jenn Suhr, Aheza Kiros and Kerron Clement won their events with world-leading times but Clement's 400 meter hurdles world leading time was disqualified due to a misplaced hurdle. Second-placed Angelo Taylor struck out at the meet organisers for their mistake, saying he would never compete again at the event.

== Meet records ==
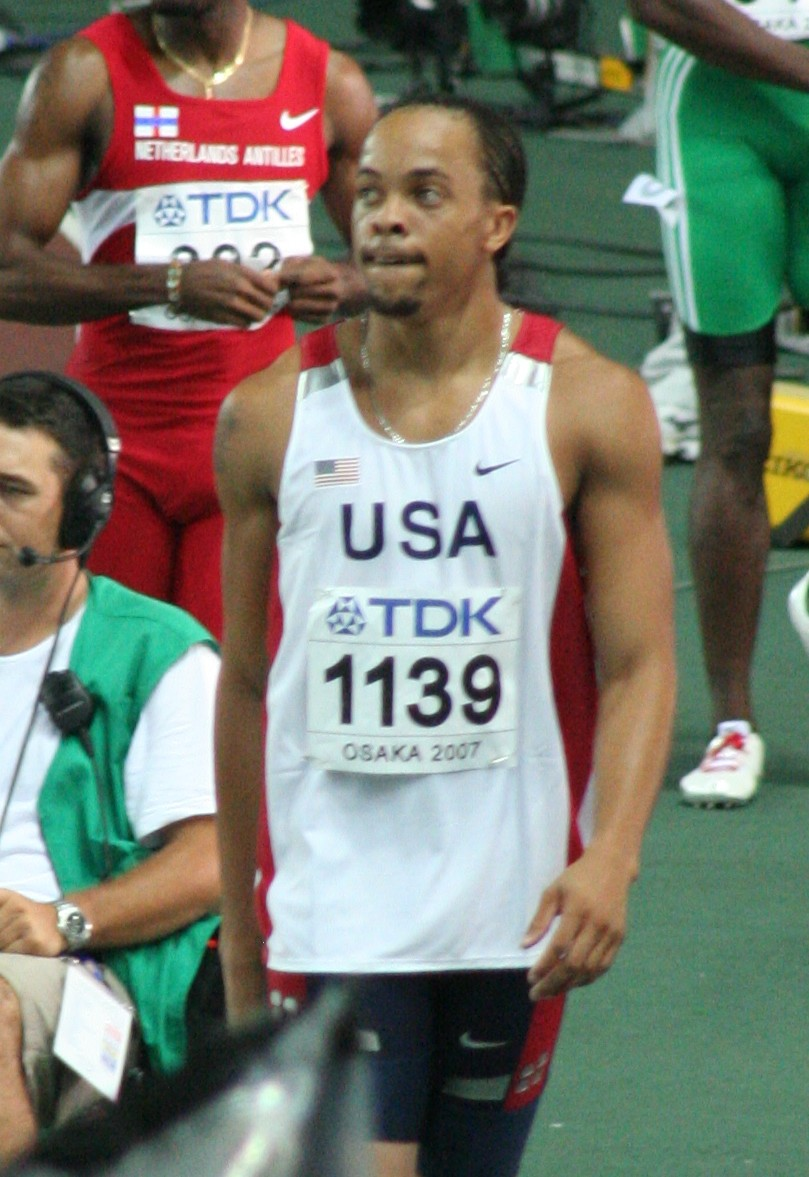
Wallace Spearmon is the current 200 meters meet record holder.

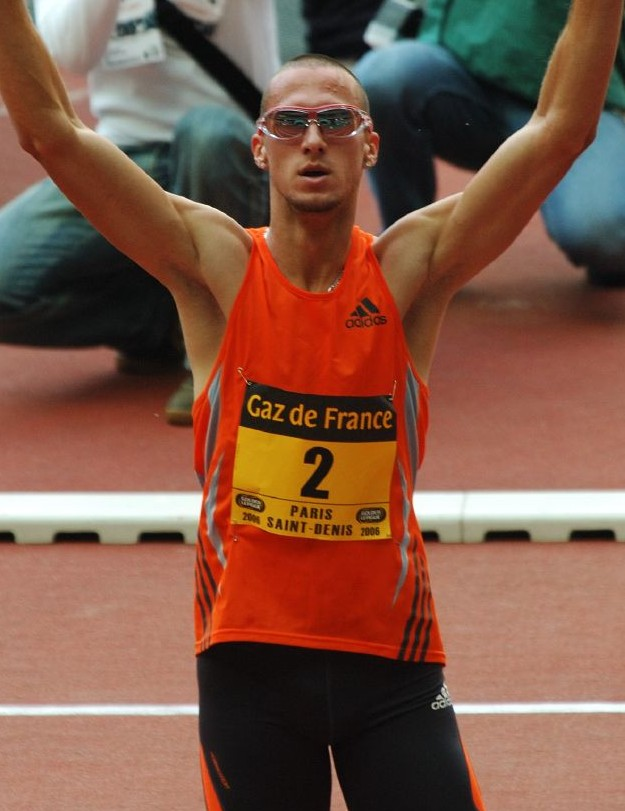
Olympic gold medalist Jeremy Wariner holds the 400 meters meet record.

Records are correct as of May 17, 2009.

=== Men ===
Men's meeting records of the Adidas Track Classic
Event	Record	Name	Nation	Date	Ref.
100 m	9.94	Maurice Greene	United States	2003	
200 m	19.91	Wallace Spearmon	United States	2007	
400 m	44.42	Jeremy Wariner	United States	18 May 2008	
800 m	1:45.23	Khadevis Robinson	United States	2006	
1500 m	3:32.34	Rashid Ramzi	Bahrain	2006	
3000 m	7:38.11	Markos Geneti	Ethiopia	2005	
2 miles	8:19.61	Markos Geneti	Ethiopia	2006	
5000 m	13:08.64	Ali Abdosh	Ethiopia	18 May 2008	
110 m hurdles	13.17	Terrence Trammell	United States	2007	
400 m hurdles	47.62	Bershawn Jackson	United States	2005	
3000 m steeplechase	8:25.16	Anthony Famiglietti	United States	2005	
Pole vault	5.60 m	Toby Stevenson	United States	2004	
Long jump	8.39 m	Hussein Taher Al-Sabee	Saudi Arabia	2003	
Triple jump	17.09 m	Kenta Bell	United States	2005	
Shot put	22.35 m	Christian Cantwell	United States	2004	
Discus throw	65.09 m	Jarred Rome	United States	18 May 2008	
Javelin throw	90.71 m	Breaux Greer	United States	2007	

=== Women ===
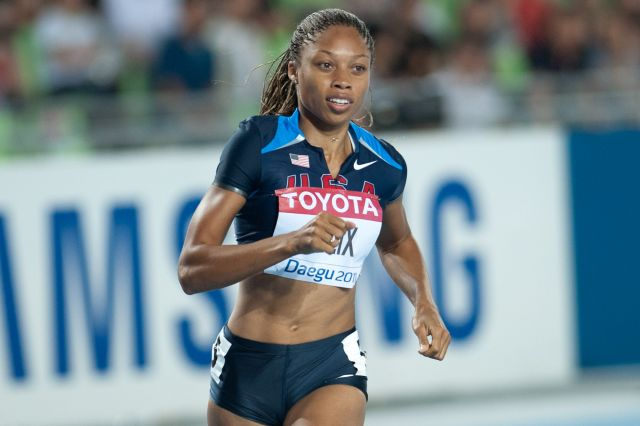
Double World Champion Allyson Felix has the 200 meters record.

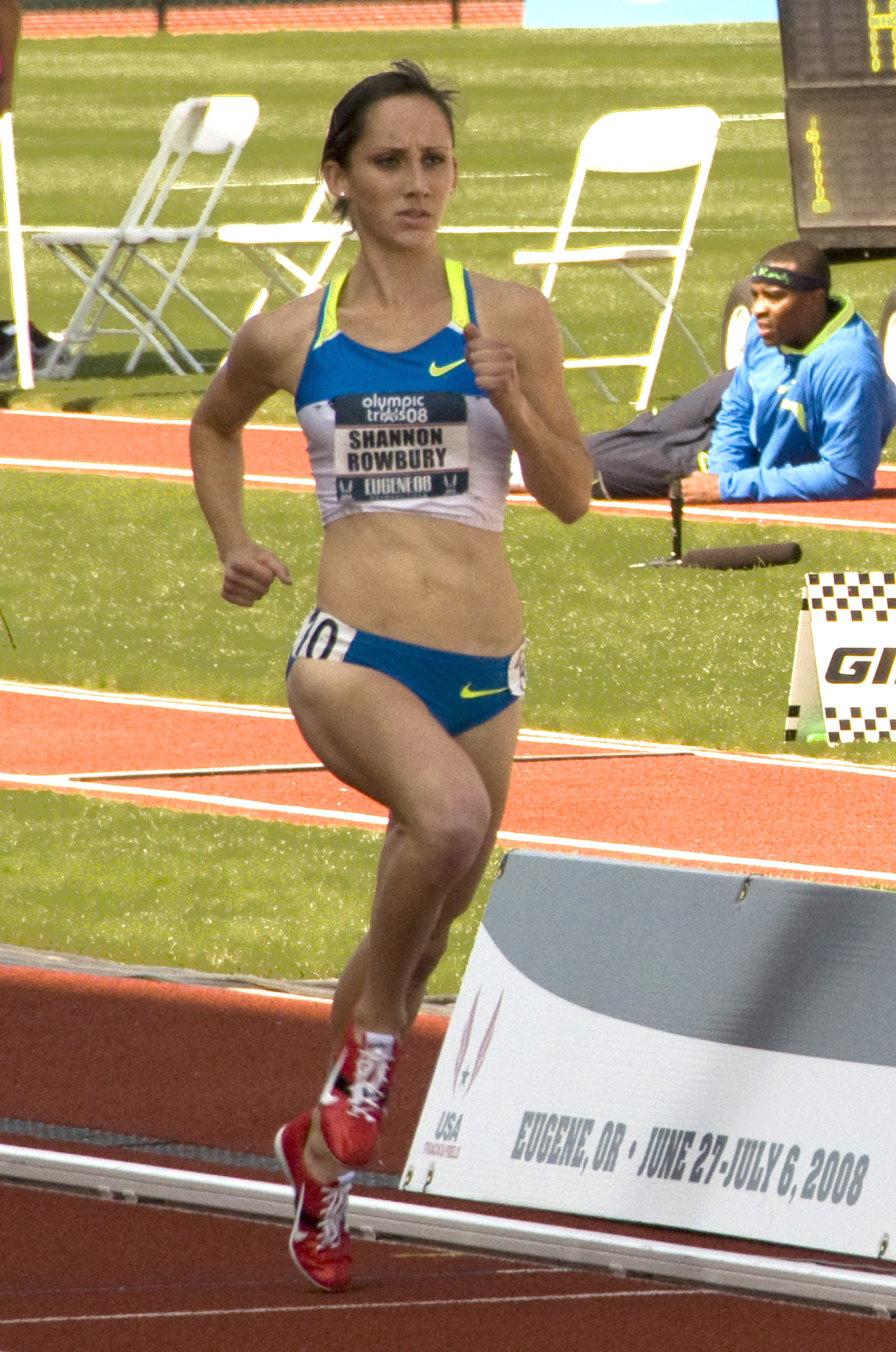
Shannon Rowbury set the 1500 meters record in 2008.

Women's meeting records of the Adidas Track Classic
Event	Record	Name	Nation	Date	Ref.
100 m	10.90	Torri Edwards	United States	2007	
200 m	22.14	Allyson Felix	United States	2005	
400 m	49.62	Ana Guevara	Mexico	2003	
800 m	2:01.40	Hazel Clark	United States	16 May 2009	
1500 m	4:01.61	Shannon Rowbury	United States	18 May 2008	
3000 m	8:37.69	Meseret Defar	Ethiopia	2007	
2 miles	9:10.47	Meseret Defar	Ethiopia	2007	
100 m hurldes	12.58	Ginnie Powell	United States	2007	
400 m hurdles	55.57	Tanisha Mills	United States	2005	
3000 m steeplechase	9:26.85	Anna Willard	United States	16 May 2009	
Pole vault	4.90 m	Jennifer Stuczynski	United States	18 May 2008	
Long jump	6.68 m	Grace Upshaw	United States	18 May 2008	
Triple jump	13.82 m	Yvette Lewis	United States	16 May 2009	
High jump	1.98 m	Tisha Waller	United States	2004	
High jump	1.98 m	Chaunte Howard	United States	18 May 2008	
Discus throw	64.71 m	Aretha Hill	United States	2003	
