= Visa Championship Series =

The Visa Championship Series was an annual series of athletics meets organised by the USA Track & Field.

== Meetings ==
Meetings in 2012

=== Indoor ===
Date	Meet	Stadium	City
28 January	U.S. Open Track and Field	Madison Square Garden	New York City
4 February	Boston Indoor Games	Reggie Lewis Track and Athletic Center	Boston
11 February	USA Track & Field Classic	Randal Tyson Track Center	Fayetteville
25–26 February	USA Indoor Track & Field Championships	Albuquerque Convention Center	Albuquerque

=== Outdoor ===
Date	Meet	Stadium	City
28 April	Penn Relays	Franklin Field	Philadelphia
2 June	Prefontaine Classic	Hayward Field	Eugene
9 June	Adidas Grand Prix	Icahn Stadium	New York City
June 24–27	USA Outdoor Track & Field Championships	Drake Stadium	Des Moines, IA
