= Lee Du-haeng =

South Korean long-distance runner

Personal information
- Born: December 25, 1981 (age 44) South Jeolla, South Korea
- Height: 1.80 m (5 ft 11 in)

Sport
- Sport: Athletics
- Event: Marathon
Medal record
Representing South Korea
East Asian Games
Silver medal – second place	2005 Macau	10,000m
Bronze medal – third place	2001 Osaka	1500m
Bronze medal – third place	2005 Macau	5000m

Lee Du-Haeng (born 25 December 1981) is a South Korean runner. Starting with the middle-distances 800 metres and 1500 metres, he turned to long-distance running 5000 and 10,000 metres and finally the marathon.

== Career ==
At the 2001 East Asian Games he finished sixth in the 800 metres and won a bronze medal in the 1500 metres. He finished tenth at the 2001 Universiade (1500 m), twelfth at the 2002 Asian Games, twelfth at the 2003 Universiade (half marathon) and eighth at the 2007 Asian Championships (5000 m). At the 2005 East Asian Games he won the bronze medal in the 5000 metres and silver medal in the 10,000 metres. At the 2009 Asian Championships he finished eighth in both the 5000 and 10,000 metres.

Internationally, he competed at the 2000 World Junior Championships and finished lowly at the 2006 World Cross Country Championships. He then specialized in the marathon race and finished 32nd at the 2012 Summer Olympics.
