= Abreham Cherkos =

Ethiopian long-distance runner (born 1989)

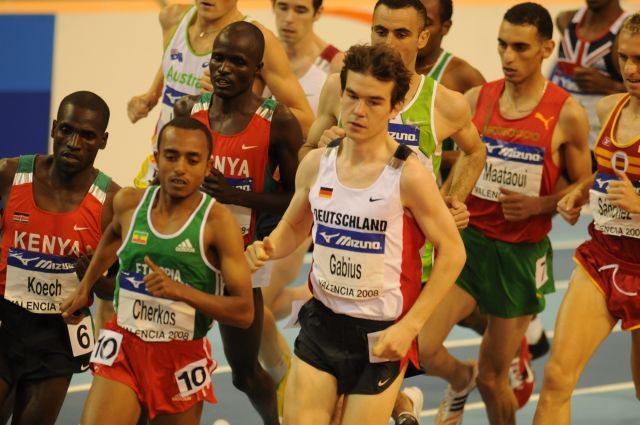
- Cherkos (in front) during the 2008 World Indoor Championships

Personal information
- Born: 23 September 1989 (age 36)
Medal record
Men's athletics
Representing Ethiopia
World Indoor Championships
Bronze medal – third place	2008 Valencia	3000 m

Abreham Cherkos Feleke (Amharic: አብረሃም ቸርቆስ ፈለቀ; born 23 September 1989) is an Ethiopian professional long-distance runner. A former track specialist, he now competes in road running events including the marathon.

He was the 2005 World Youth Champion in the 3000 m and upgraded to a world junior silver medal the next year over 5000 m. He took bronze at the 2006 IAAF World Athletics Final and represented Ethiopia at the 2007 World Championships in Athletics. He won his first major senior medal (a bronze) at the 2008 IAAF World Indoor Championships.

He became world junior champion in 2008 and also made his Olympic debut, finishing fifth at the 2008 Beijing Games. After a year out in 2009, he made his marathon debut in 2010 at the Amsterdam Marathon, setting a best of 2:07:29.

== Career ==
Abreham Cherkos was born in Asella in Ethiopia's Oromia Region – the same town as multiple-gold medallist Haile Gebrselassie. Abreham made his international debut at the World Youth Championships in 2005, where he won the world youth title ahead of another great Ethiopian Prospect Ibrahim Jailan. In the 3000 metres race held in Marrakesh, he covered the last km in 2:27, indicating his speed in distance events. He set a world youth best of 7:32.37 for the 3000 m in Lausanne that year. In 2006 Abreham began his international year by beating veteran runner Abraham Chebii of Kenya at the Carlsbad 5000, completing the 5 km road race in 13:14.

Later in the year, Abreham, in one of the most famous athletics stadiums – Bislett Stadion – he ran 12:59 in only his second 5000 metres race, finishing fifth behind a group of experienced runners including Kenenisa Bekele of Ethiopia and Isaac Kiprono Songok of Kenya. He followed his sub-13 minute performance with a 12:54.19 in Rome later on in the season. At sixteen years of age Abreham was running under the world record 12 years earlier. He completed the 2006 season with a silver medal in the 2006 World Junior Championships behind his older countryman Tariku Bekele. At the last meet of the year he beat Tariku at the IAAF World Athletics Final.

As a junior with one year of competition under his belt Abreham was able to finish third against the top athletes at the discipline at the 2008 IAAF World Indoor Championships. He finished fifth at the 2008 Beijing Olympics in the 5000 m later that year.

He competed at the 2010 Giro di Castelbuono in July and finished second, behind Zersenay Tadese but ahead of Samuel Wanjiru and former winner Vincent Kipruto. This race proved to be good preparation for the Amsterdam Marathon in October as he took fourth place in a quick race, clocking a time of 2:07:29 on his debut to finish six seconds behind compatriot Chala Dechase.

He began 2011 with a run at the Roma-Ostia Half Marathon and he finished fourth in 61:42 minutes. He was invited to the 2011 Boston Marathon and ended the race in fifth place with a time of 2:06:13 (a personal best, but on a wind-assisted course). His sole outing the following year came at the 2012 London Marathon, but he was much slower and his time of 2:12:46 hours left him in 15th place and out of touch with the top runners. He missed the entire 2013, but returned in 2014 in good form, running a legal-course best of 2:07:08 hours to take fifth at the Seoul International Marathon.

== Achievements ==
=== Competition record ===
Year	Competition	Venue	Position	Event	Notes
Representing Ethiopia
2005	World Youth Championships	Marrakesh, Morocco	1st	3000 m	8:00.90
2006	World Junior Championships	Beijing, China	2nd	5000 m	13:35.95
2006	World Athletics Final	Stuttgart, Germany	3rd	5000 m	13:49.66
2007	World Championships	Osaka, Japan	8th	5000 m	13:51.01
2008	World Indoor Championships	Valencia, Spain	3rd	3000 m	7:49.96
2008	World Junior Championships	Bydgoszcz, Poland	1st	5000 m	13:08.57
2008	Olympic Games	Beijing, China	5th	5000 m	13:16.46

=== Personal bests ===
- 1500 metres - 3:42.91 min (2005)
- 3000 metres - 7:31.81 min (2009)
- 5000 metres - 12:54.19 min (2006)
- 10K run – 28:14 min (2010)
- Half marathon – 61:42 min (2011)
- Marathon – 2:06:13 hrs / 2:07:08 hrs (former time on assisted Boston Marathon course)
