= Nicholas Kemboi (born 1983) =

Qatari long-distance runner

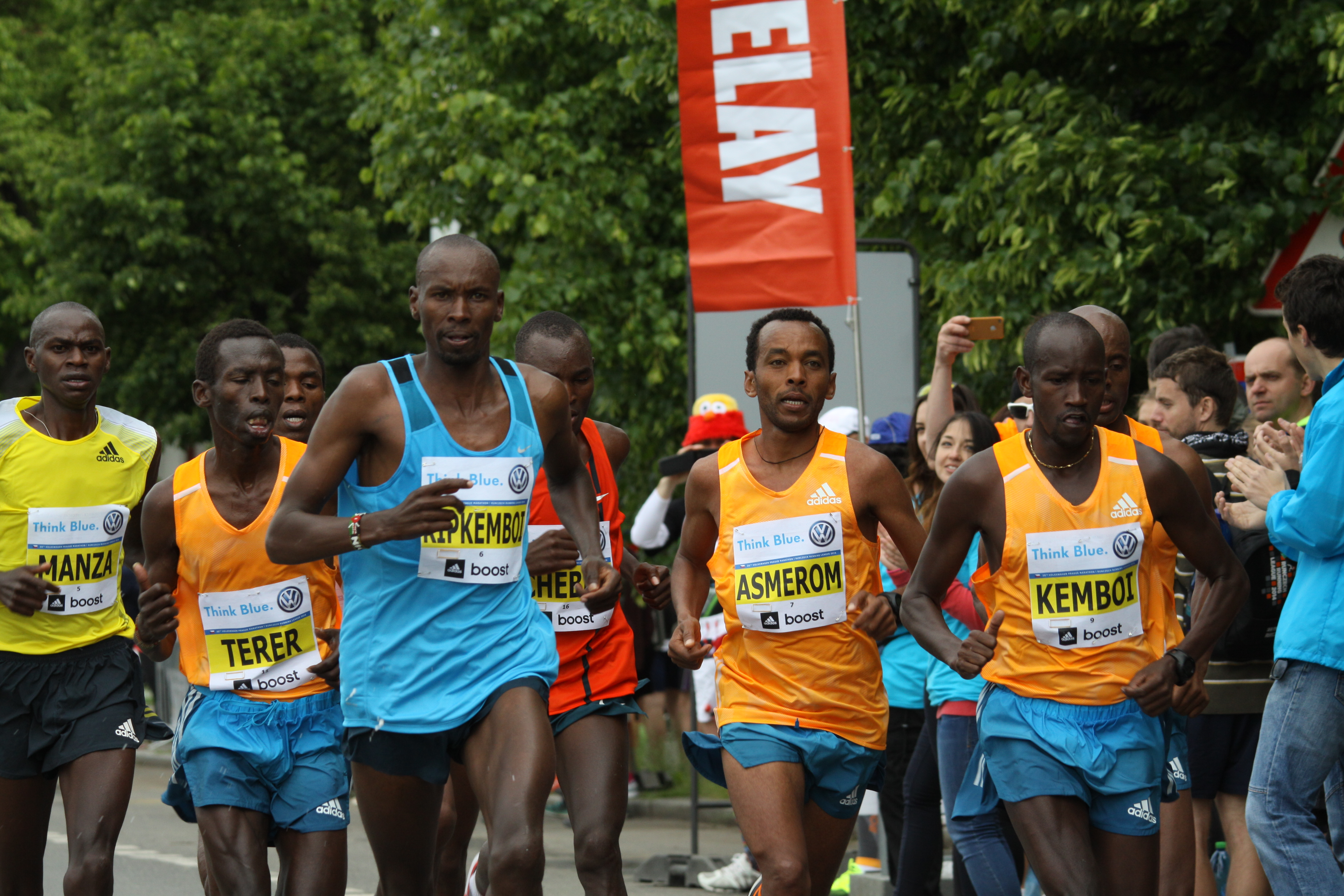
- Nicholas Kemboi in Prague International Marathon in 2014

Medal record

Men's athletics

Representing Qatar

Asian Championships
| Silver medal – second place | 2009 Guangzhou | 10,000 m |

Nicholas Kemboi (born November 25, 1983, in Kericho) is an athlete from Qatar who specialises in long-distance running. Unlike many other Kenyan-born athletes, he kept his name when changing affiliation to the Middle Eastern country.

He is the fifth fastest man of all time at 10,000 meters, with a personal best of 26:30.03 set in 2003 at the young age of 20. He was the silver medallist in the event at the 2009 Asian Athletics Championships.

He made a step up to the marathon distance in 2011, running a best of 2:08:01 hours at the Valencia Marathon. He was twelve minutes slower at the Istanbul Marathon in 2012, but earned his first victory in 2013 with a win at the Prague Marathon in 2:08:51 hours.

== International competitions ==
| Year | Competition | Venue | Position | Event | Notes |
|---|---|---|---|---|---|
| 2001 | World Cross Country Championships | Ostend, Belgium | 4th | Junior race | |
| 2002 | World Cross Country Championships | Dublin, Ireland | 7th | Junior race | |
| 2003 | World Athletics Final | Monte Carlo, Monaco | 7th | 5000 m | |
| 2005 | World Championships | Helsinki, Finland | 9th | 10,000 m | |
| 2009 | World Championships | Berlin, Germany | DNF | 10,000 metres | |
| 2009 | Asian Championships | Guangzhou, China | 2nd | 10,000 metres | |

== Personal bests ==
Track:

- 1500 metres - 3:47.10 (2005)
- 3000 metres - 7:50.99 (2005)
- 5000 metres - 13:01.14 (2003)
- 10,000 metres - 26:30.03 (2003)

Road:

- 10 kilometres - 27:57 (2011)
- 15 kilometres - 43:56 (2003)
- Half marathon - 1:00:27 (2011)
- Marathon – 2:08:01 (2011)
