= James Kwalia =

Qatari-Kenyan long-distance runner (born 1984)

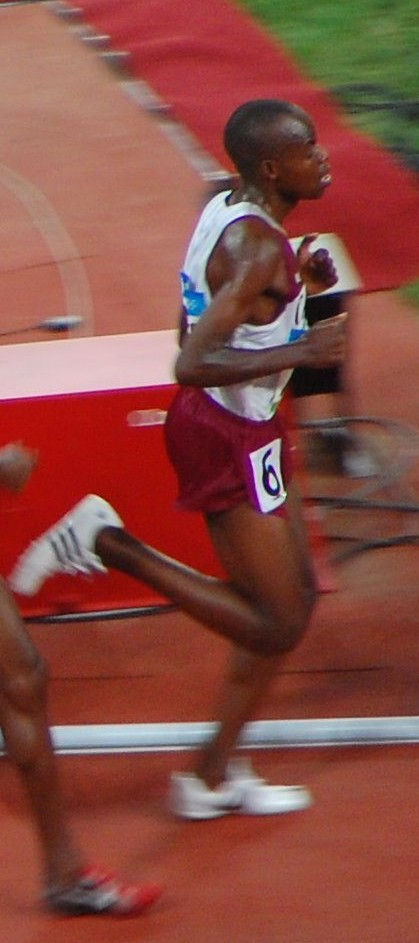

Medal record

Representing Qatar

Men's athletics

World Championships
Bronze medal – third place	2009 Berlin	5000 m

Asian Games
Gold medal – first place	2006 Doha	5000 m

Asian Championships
Gold medal – first place	2005 Incheon	5000 m
Gold medal – first place	2009 Guangzhou	5000 m

Asian Indoor Championships
Bronze medal – third place	2008 Doha	3000 m

James Kwalia C'Kurui (born James Kwalia Chepkurui on 12 June 1984) is an athlete who represents Qatar after switching from his homeland Kenya. Specializing in the 3000 and 5000 metres, his personal best times are 7:28.28 minutes and 12:54.58 minutes respectively. He was born in Trans Nzoia. He is the current holder of the Asian indoor record over 5000 m which he broke in Düsseldorf in February 2009.

== Biography ==
He had his first success while competing for Kenya when he won the bronze medal in the 3000 m at the 2001 World Youth Championships in Athletics. His first senior medal came at the 2004 IAAF World Athletics Final, where he took the 3000 m silver. He transferred to represent Qatar following this and was very successful in Asian competitions, winning at the 2005 Asian Athletics Championships and the 2006 Asian Games.

He represented Qatar at the Olympics for the first time with an appearance at the 2008 Beijing Games – he finished eighth in the 5000 m. He improved at the next major competition, taking the bronze medal at the 2009 World Championships in Athletics. A streak of wins at Asian championships followed: he set a new Games record in the 3000 m at the 2009 Asian Indoor Games, won the 5000 m title at the 2009 Asian Athletics Championships for a second time and won his first indoor title soon after at the 2010 Asian Indoor Athletics Championships. From the beginning of his career, he was coached by the Italian Renato Canova, under the management of Gianni Demadonna.

He is from Kaptama in Mount Elgon District. Prominent runner Edith Masai is from the same area.

== International competitions ==
Year	Competition	Venue	Position	Event	Time	Team	Notes
2001	World Youth Championships	Debrecen, Hungary	3rd	3000 m	7:57.71	Kenya	
2005	World Cross Country Championships	St Etienne, France	15th	Short race		Qatar	
2005	World Championships	Helsinki, Finland	13th	5000 m	13:38.90	Qatar	
2005	Asian Championships	Incheon, South Korea	1st	5000 m	14:08.56	Qatar	
2006	World Cross Country Championships	Fukuoka, Japan	43rd	Short race		Qatar	
2006	Asian Games	Doha, Qatar	1st	5000 m	13:38.90	Qatar (QAT)	
2008	Asian Indoor Championships	Doha, Qatar	3rd	3000 m	7:50.76	Qatar	
2008	World Indoor Championships	Valencia, Spain	9th	3000 m	8:00.44	Qatar	
2008	Olympic Games	Beijing, China	8th	5000 m	13:23.48	Qatar	
2009	Asian Indoor Games	Hanoi, Vietnam	1st	3000 m	8:00.40	Qatar	GR
2009	Asian Championships	Guangzhou, China	1st	5000 m	14:02.90	Qatar	
2009	World Championships	Berlin, Germany	3rd	5000 m	13:17.78	Qatar	
2010	Asian Indoor Championships	Tehran, Iran	1st	3000 m	7:57.73	Qatar	
2010	World Indoor Championships	Doha, Qatar	8th	3000 m	7:46.12	Qatar	
2010	Asian Games	Guangzhou, China	2nd	5000 m	13:48.55	Qatar (QAT)	

== Circuit performances ==
Year	Competition	Venue	Position	Event	Notes
2003	World Athletics Final	Monte Carlo, Monaco	5th	3000 m	
2004	World Athletics Final	Monte Carlo, Monaco	2nd	3000 m	
2005	World Athletics Final	Monte Carlo, Monaco	6th	5000 m	
2008	World Athletics Final	Stuttgart, Germany	5th	3000 m	
