= Ho Chin-ping =

Taiwanese marathon runner

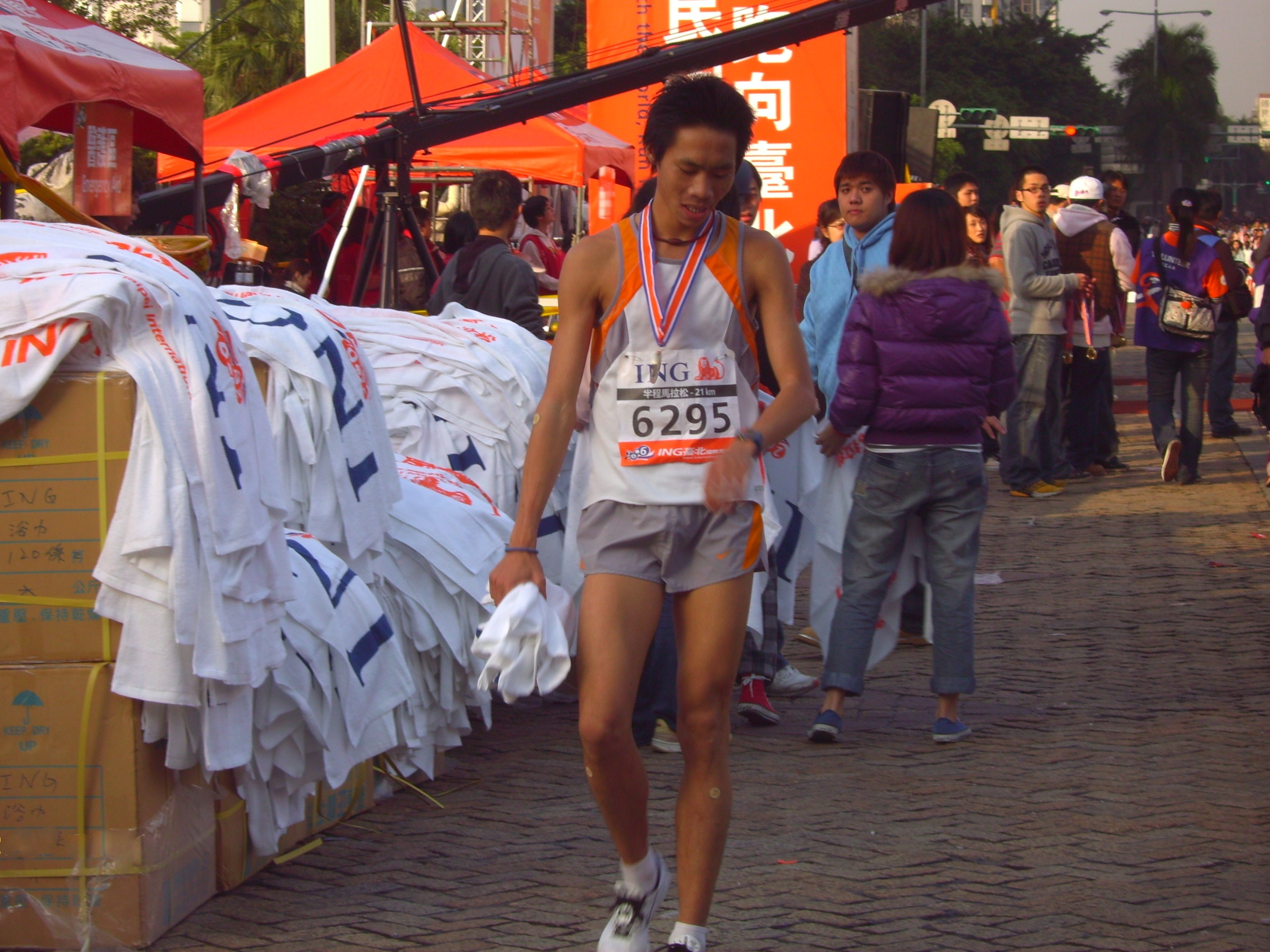
- Ho Chin-ping at 2006 Taipei Marathon

Personal information
- Born: 23 October 1983 (age 42) Kinmen, Fujian Province, Republic of China

Sport
- Country: Chinese Taipei
- Sport: Track and field
- Event: long-distance running
- Updated on 2 September 2015

Ho Chin-ping (Chinese: 何盡平; born 23 October 1983) is a male Taiwanese long-distance runner. He competed in the marathon event at the 2015 World Championships in Athletics in Beijing, China.

Ho is from Kinmen. He attended the National Taiwan Sport University, where he was coached by Hsu Gi-sheng.

== See also ==
- Chinese Taipei at the 2015 World Championships in Athletics
