= Essa Ismail Rashed =

Kenyan-born Qatari long-distance runner

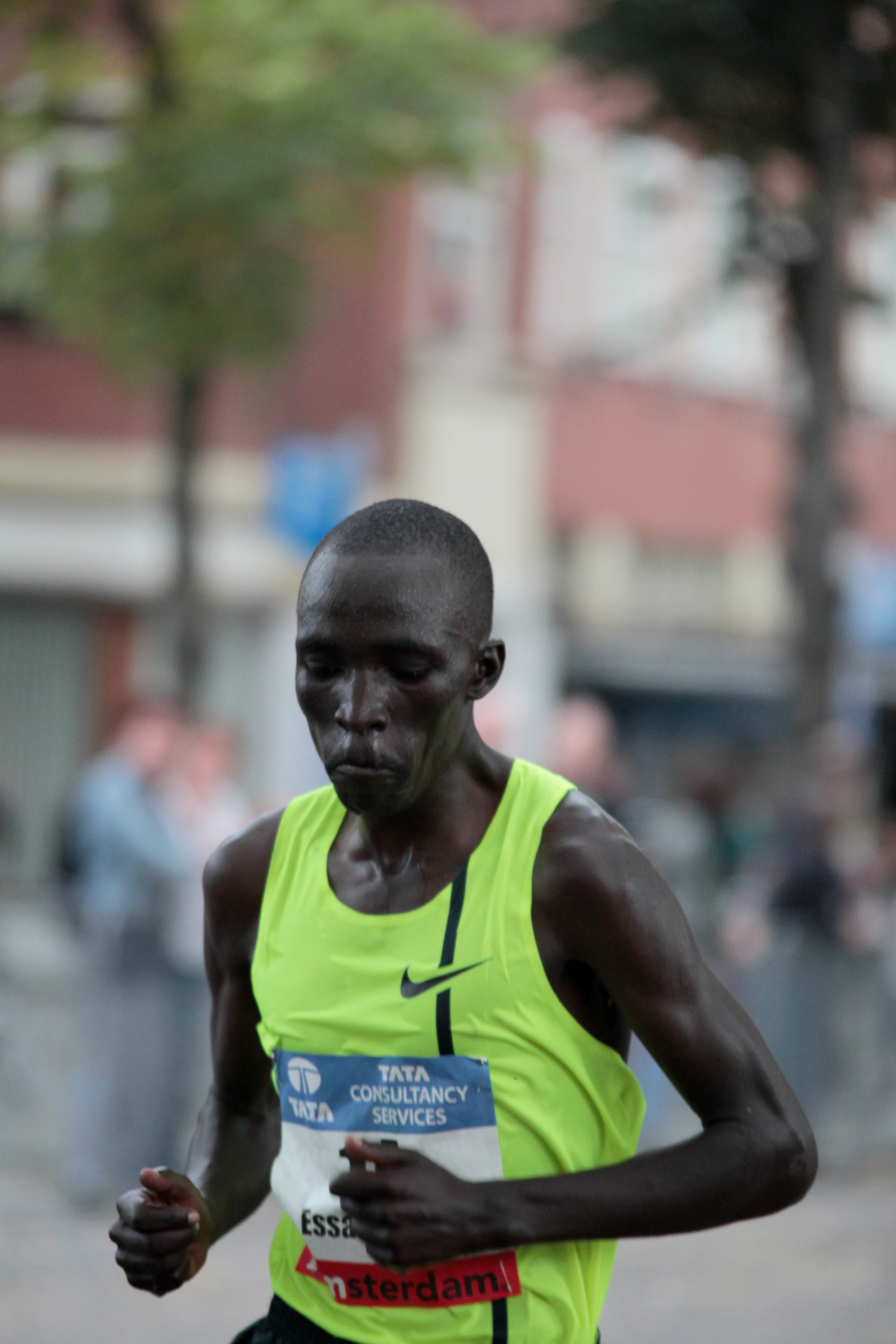
- Rashed in 2014
Medal record
Representing Qatar
Men's athletics
Asian Games
Silver medal – second place	2006 Doha	10,000 m
Silver medal – second place	2010 Guangzhou	10,000 m
Asian Championships
Gold medal – first place	2005 Incheon	10,000 m
Bronze medal – third place	2009 Guangzhou	5000 m

Essa Ismail Rashed (Arabic: عيسى اسماعيل راشد; born Daniel Kipkosgei on 14 December 1986) is a long-distance runner now representing Qatar after his switch from Kenya in 2004. He represented his adopted country at the 2008 Summer Olympics and the World Championships in Athletics in 2005 and 2007. He is coached by the Italian Renato Canova.

In 10,000 metres he won a gold medal at the 2005 Asian Championships in Incheon and a silver medal at the 2006 Asian Games in Doha. He came twentieth in the 10,000 metres at the 2008 Beijing Olympics. He was the 5000 m bronze medallist at the 2009 Asian Athletics Championships and went on to claim another bronze over 3000 m at the 2009 Asian Indoor Games later that year.

Rashed ran an Asian indoor record for the 5000 m at the PSD Bank Meeting in Düsseldorf in 2010, running a time of 13:19.10 minutes. Later that month he was just pipped to the gold in the 3000 m by teammate James Kwalia at the 2010 Asian Indoor Athletics Championships. He gained selection for the 2010 IAAF World Indoor Championships and came ninth in the 3000 m final. He claimed a consecutive silver medal in the 10,000 m at the 2010 Asian Games.

He ran a personal best in the marathon at the 2012 Amsterdam Marathon, coming eleventh with his run of 2:09:22 hours.
