= Boxing at the 1996 Summer Olympics – Light flyweight =

Boxing competitions

Light flyweight boxing at the Games of the XXVI Olympiad
- Venue: Alexander Memorial Coliseum
- Dates: 20 July – 3 August 1996
- Competitors: 30 from 30 nations

Medalists
1st place, gold medalist(s)		Daniel Petrov	Bulgaria
2nd place, silver medalist(s)		Mansueto Velasco	Philippines
3rd place, bronze medalist(s)		Oleg Kiryukhin	Ukraine
3rd place, bronze medalist(s)		Rafael Lozano	Spain

The light flyweight class in the boxing at the 1996 Summer Olympics competition was the lightest class at the 1996 Summer Olympics in Atlanta, Georgia. The weight class is open for boxers up to 48 kilograms. The competition in the Alexander Memorial Coliseum started on 20 July and ended on 3 August 1996.

== Qualified boxers ==
Athlete	Notes
Nshan Munchyan (ARM)	
Daniel Petrov (BUL)	1995 World Championships
Mansueto Velasco (PHI)	Asian Championships
Oleg Kiryukhin (UKR)	1996 European Championships
Rafael Lozano (ESP)	1996 European Championships
Somrot Kamsing (THA)	Asian Championships
Albert Guardado (USA)	1995 Pan American Games
Hamid Berhili (MAR)	1st African Olympic Qualification
La Paene Masara (INA)	
Sabin Bornei (ROU)	1996 European Championships
Beibis Mendoza (COL)	1996 South American Championships
Anicet Rasoanaivo (MAD)	
Yosvani Aguilera (CUB)	
Yang Xiangzhong (CHN)	
Masibulele Makepula (RSA)	1995 All-Africa Games
Jesús Martínez (MEX)	2nd North & Central American Olympic Qualification
Yaşar Giritli (TUR)	4th 1996 European Championships
José Pérez Reyes (DOM)	1st North & Central American Olympic Qualification
Domenic Figliomeni (CAN)	
Abdul Rashid Qambrani (PAK)	
Geovany Baca (HON)	1995 Pan American Games
Healer Modiradilo (BOT)	
Stefan Ström (SWE)	
Tsai Chih-hsiu (TPE)	
Alfred Tetteh (GHA)	2nd African Olympic Qualification
Alberto Rossel (PER)	1996 South American Championships
Joseph Benhard (NAM)	
Debendra Thapa (IND)	
Sapok Biki (MAS)	
Peter Baláž (SVK)	

== Medalists ==
Gold	Daniel Petrov; Bulgaria
Silver	Mansueto Velasco; Philippines
Bronze	Rafael Lozano; Spain
Bronze	Oleg Kiryukhin; Ukraine

== Results ==
Round of 32
Kiryukhin (UKR)	17
Qambrani (PAK)	3
Figliomeni (CAN)	1
Mendoza (COL)	12
Modiradilo (BOT)	9
Guardado (USA)	11
Rasoanaivo (MAD)	12
Baca (HON)	0
Bornei (ROM)	16
Pérez Reyes (DOM)	10
Giritli (TUR)	4
Kamsing (THA)	19
Baláž (SVK)	3
Masara (INA)	13
Martínez (MEX)	15
Biki (MAS)	4
Makepula (RSA)	RCS-1
Debendra (IND)	(01:41)
Benhard (NAM)	2
Lozano (ESP)	10
Velasco (PHI)	RSC-1
Chih-Hsiu (TPE)	(02:27)
Strøm (SWE)	(02:26)
Aguilera (CUB)	RSC-2
Berhili (MAR)	10
Tetteh (GHA)	5
Rossel (PER)	7
Xiangzhong (CHN)	16

Round of 16
Kiryukhin (UKR)	18
Mendoza (COL)	6
Guardado (USA)	9
Rasoanaivo (MAD)	4
Munchyan (ARM)	5
Petrov (BUL)	11
Bornei (ROM)	7
Kamsing (THA)	18
Masara (INA)	8
Martínez (MEX)	1
Makepula (RSA)	3
Lozano (ESP)	14
Velasco (PHI)	14
Aguilera (CUB)	5
Berhili (MAR)	14
Xiangzhong (CHN)	9

Quarterfinals
Kiryukhin (UKR)	19
Guardado (USA)	14
Petrov (BUL)	18
Kamsing (THA)	6
Masara (INA)	9
Lozano (ESP)	10
Velasco (PHI)	20
Berhili (MAR)	10

Semifinals
Kiryukhin (UKR)	8
Petrov (BUL)	17
Lozano (ESP)	10
Velasco (PHI)	22

Final
Petrov (BUL)	19
Velasco (PHI)	6
