= Philippines at the 1996 Summer Olympics =

- Flag of the Philippines
- IOC code: PHI
- NOC: Philippine Olympic Committee
- Website: www.olympic.ph

in Atlanta
- Competitors: 12 in 6 sports
- Flag bearer: Reynaldo Galido
- Medals Ranked 61st: Gold 0 Silver 1 Bronze 0 Total 1

Summer Olympics appearances (overview)
- 1924; 1928; 1932; 1936; 1948; 1952; 1956; 1960; 1964; 1968; 1972; 1976; 1980; 1984; 1988; 1992; 1996; 2000; 2004; 2008; 2012; 2016; 2020; 2024

The Philippines competed at the 1996 Summer Olympics in Atlanta, United States. The 12-athlete delegation to the 1996 Atlanta Olympics competed in athletics, badminton, boxing, equestrian, shooting and swimming. This was the last Olympic games where the Philippines brought home a medal, a silver by boxer Mansueto Velasco, until weightlifter Hidilyn Diaz won a silver medal at the 2016 Summer Olympics, and eventually the country's first gold medal at the 2020 Summer Olympics.

== Medalists ==
Medal	Name	Sport	Event	Date
Silver	Mansueto Velasco	Boxing	Light flyweight	August 3

== Athletics ==
Men's Marathon

Athletes	Events	Heat Round 1		Heat Round 2		Semifinal		Final	
Athletes	Events	Time	Rank	Time	Rank	Time	Rank	Time	Rank
Roy Vence	Marathon	N/A						2:37:10	100

Women's Long Jump

Athlete	Event	Qualification		Final	
Athlete	Event	Distance	Position	Distance	Position
Elma Muros	Long jump	6.04 m	30	did not advance	

== Badminton ==
Athlete	Event	Round of 64	Round of 32	Round of 16	Quarterfinal	Semifinal	Final / BM	
Athlete	Event	Opposition Score	Opposition Score	Opposition Score	Opposition Score	Opposition Score	Opposition Score	Rank
Amparo Lim	Women's singles	Krasowska (POL); L 6–11, 5–11	did not advance					

== Boxing ==
Athlete	Event	Round of 32	Round of 16	Quarterfinals	Semifinals	Final	
Athlete	Event	Opposition Result	Opposition Result	Opposition Result	Opposition Result	Opposition Result	Rank
Mansueto Velasco	Light flyweight	Tsai (TPE); W RSC	Aguilera (CUB); W 14–5	Berhili (MAR); W 20–10	Lozano (ESP); W 22–10	Petrov (BUL); L 6–19	2nd place, silver medalist(s)
Elias Recaido	Flyweight	Mapfumo (ZIM); W 13–2	Samoilenco (MDA); W 12–8	Romero (CUB); L 3–18	did not advance		
Virgilio Vicera	Bantamweight	Bae (KOR); L 4–8	did not advance				
Romeo Brin	Lightweight	Valladares (CUB); L 13–24	did not advance				
Reynaldo Galido	Light welterweight	Urkal (GER); L 2–19	did not advance				

== Equestrian ==
Athlete	Horse	Event	Qualifying					Final	Rank
Athlete	Horse	Event	Round 1	Round 2	Round 3	Total points	Rank	Final	Rank
Denise Cojuangco	Chouman	Individual Jumping	9.75	27.25	26.00	63.00	70	did not advance	

== Shooting ==
Men's Trap

Athlete	Event	Qualification		Semifinal		Final	
Athlete	Event	Points	Rank	Points	Rank	Points	Rank
George Earnshaw	Trap	113	56	did not advance			

Men's Double Trap

Athlete	Event	Qualification		Semifinal		Final	
Athlete	Event	Points	Rank	Points	Rank	Points	Rank
George Earnshaw	Double Trap	125	27	did not advance			

== Swimming ==
Men

Athlete	Event	Heat		Final B		Final	
Athlete	Event	Time	Rank	Time	Rank	Time	Rank
Raymond Papa	100 m backstroke	57.67	31	did not advance			
Raymond Papa	200 m backstroke	2:05.09	25	did not advance			

Women

Athlete	Event	Heat		Final B		Final	
Athlete	Event	Time	Rank	Time	Rank	Time	Rank
Gillian Thomson	200 m backstroke	2:21.36	29	did not advance			
