= Thailand at the 1996 Summer Olympics =

- IOC code: THA
- NOC: National Olympic Committee of Thailand
- Website: www.olympicthai.or.th (in Thai and English)

in Atlanta
- Competitors: 37 (25 men and 12 women) in 10 sports
- Flag bearer: Vissanu Sophanich
- Medals Ranked 47th: Gold 1 Silver 0 Bronze 1 Total 2

Summer Olympics appearances (overview)
- 1952; 1956; 1960; 1964; 1968; 1972; 1976; 1980; 1984; 1988; 1992; 1996; 2000; 2004; 2008; 2012; 2016; 2020; 2024

Thailand was represented at the 1996 Summer Olympics in Atlanta, Georgia, United States by the National Olympic Committee of Thailand.

In total, 37 athletes including 25 men and 12 woman represented Thailand in 10 different sports including athletics, badminton, boxing, diving, judo, sailing, shooting, swimming, tennis and weightlifting.

Thailand won a total of two medals at the games including their first-ever gold medal. Somluck Kamsing claimed gold in the boxinf featherweight category and Vichairachanon Khadpo won bronze in the boxing bantamweight category.

== Competitors ==
In total, 37 athletes represented Thailand at the 1996 Summer Olympics in Atlanta, Georgia, United States across 10 different sports.

Sport	Men	Women	Total
Athletics	4	4	8
Badminton	5	2	7
Boxing	6	—	6
Diving	1	1	2
Judo	1	0	1
Sailing	1	0	1
Shooting	2	1	3
Swimming	4	2	6
Tennis	0	2	2
Weightlifting	1	—	1
Total	25	12	37

== Medalists ==
Thailand won a total of two medals at the games including their first-ever gold medal. Somluck Kamsing claimed gold in the boxinf featherweight category and Vichairachanon Khadpo won bronze in the boxing bantamweight category.

Medal	Name	Sport	Event
Gold	Somluck Kamsing	Boxing	Featherweight
Bronze	Vichairachanon Khadpo	Boxing	Bantamweight

== Athletics ==
In total, eight Thai athletes participated in the athletics events.

Men's 4 × 100 metres Relay

- Sayan Namwong, Worasit Vechaphut, Kongdech Natenee, and Ekkachai Janthana

Women's 4 × 100 metres Relay

- Sunisa Kawrungruang, Kwuanfah Inchareon, Savitree Srichure, and Supaporn Hubson

== Badminton ==
In total, seven Thai athletes participated in the badminton events.

Men

Athlete	Event	Round of 64	Round of 32	Round of 16	Quarterfinals	Semifinals	Final	Rank
Athlete	Event	Opposition Score	Opposition Score	Opposition Score	Opposition Score	Opposition Score	Opposition Score	Rank
Kitipon Kitikul	Singles	Todor Velkov (BUL); W (15-7,17-15)	Fumihiko Machida (JPN); L (7-15,11-15)	did not advance				
Siripong Siripul; Khunakorn Sudhisodhi	Doubles	—	Ha Tae-kwon; Kang Kyung-Jin (KOR); L (8-15,5-15)	did not advance				
Pramote Teerawiwatana; Sakrapee Thongsari	Doubles	—	Bye	Simon Archer; Chris Hunt (GBR); L (14-18,11-15)	did not advance			

Women

Athlete	Event	Round of 64	Round of 32	Round of 16	Quarterfinals	Semifinals	Final	Rank
Athlete	Event	Opposition Score	Opposition Score	Opposition Score	Opposition Score	Opposition Score	Opposition Score	Rank
Somharuthai Jaroensiri	Singles	Elsa Nielsen (ISL); W (11-1,11-2)	Margit Borg (SWE); L (3-11,11-7,5-11)	did not advance				
Pornsawan Plungwech	Singles	Catrine Bengtsson (SWE); W (11-4,4-11,11-6)	Jeng Shwu-Zen (TPE); W (11-5,11-0)	Han Jingna (CHN); L (3-11,6-11)	did not advance			

== Boxing ==
In total, six Thai athletes participated in the boxing events.

Athlete	Event	Round of 32	Round of 16	Quarterfinals	Semifinals	Final	Rank
Athlete	Event	Opposition Result	Opposition Result	Opposition Result	Opposition Result	Opposition Result	Rank
Somrot Kamsing	Light flyweight	Yaşar Giritli (TUR); W 19:4	Sabin Bornei (ROM); W 18:7	Daniel Petrov (BUL); L 6:18	did not advance		
Parmuansak Phosuvan	Flyweight	Khaled Falah (SYR); L 9:11	did not advance				
Vichairachanon Khadpo	Bantamweight	Claude Lambert (CAN); W 12:2	Carlos Barreto (VEN); W 14:6	Hicham Nafil (MAR); W 13:4	István Kovács (HUN); L 7:12	did not advance	Bronze medal
Somluck Kamsing	Featherweight	Luis Seda (PUR); W 13:2	Phillip Ndou (RSA); W 12:7	Ramaz Paliani (RUS); W 13:4	Pablo Chacón (ARG); W 20:8	Serafim Todorov (BUL); W 8:5	Gold medal
Pongsith Wiangwiset	Lightweight	Irvin Buhlalu (RSA); W 21:5	Jaroslav Konečný (CZE); W 20:6	Terrance Cauthen (USA); L 10:14	did not advance		
Parkpoom Jangphonak	Welterweight	Sergly Dzinziruk (UKR); L 10:20	did not advance				

== Diving ==
In total, two Thai athletes participated in the diving events.

Men

Athlete	Event	Preliminary		Semifinal		Final	
Athlete	Event	Points	Rank	Points	Rank	Points	Rank
Suchart Pichi	3m springboard	257.13	34	did not advance			
Suchart Pichi	10m platform	290.64	29	did not advance			

Women

Athlete	Event	Preliminary		Semifinal		Final	
Athlete	Event	Points	Rank	Points	Rank	Points	Rank
Sukrutai Tommaoros	10m platform	115.44	33	did not advance			

== Judo ==
In total, one Thai athlete participated in the judo events.

== Sailing ==
In total, one Thai athlete participated in the sailing events.

Athlete	Event	Race									Net points	Final rank
Athlete	Event	1	2	3	4	5	6	7	8	9	Net points	Final rank
Arun Homraruen	Mistral One Design	13	27	14	~~47~~	~~31~~	28	17	5	34	135	21

== Shooting ==
In total, three Thai athletes participated in the shooting events.

Men

Athlete	Event	Qualification		Final	
Athlete	Event	Points	Rank	Points	Rank
Jakkrit Panichpatikum	50 m pistol	536	43	did not advance	
Jakkrit Panichpatikum	10 m air pistol	574	29	did not advance	
Surin Klomjai	50 m pistol	542	40	did not advance	
Surin Klomjai	10 m air pistol	547	50	did not advance	

Women

Athlete	Event	Qualification		Final	
Athlete	Event	Points	Rank	Points	Rank
Jarintorn Dangpiam	50 m rifle three positions	570	30	did not advance	
Jarintorn Dangpiam	10 m air rifle	388	29	did not advance	

== Swimming ==
In total, six Thai athletes participated in the swimming events.

Men

Athlete	Event	Heat		Final B		Final A	
Athlete	Event	Time	Rank	Time	Rank	Time	Rank
Torlarp Sethsothorn	200 m freestyle	1:54.73	33	did not advance			
Torlarp Sethsothorn	400 m freestyle	3:57.08	19	did not advance			
Torlarp Sethsothorn	1500 m freestyle	15:40.04	16	did not advance			
Dulyarit Phuangthong	100 m backstroke	58.32	38	did not advance			
Dulyarit Phuangthong	200 m backstroke	2:05.26	26	did not advance			
Ratapong Sirisanont	200 m breaststroke	1:03.81	26	did not advance			
Ratapong Sirisanont	200 m breaststroke	2:17.32	19	did not advance			
Ratapong Sirisanont	200 m individual medley	2:05.18	5 QC	2:05.02	15	did not advance	
Ratapong Sirisanont	200 m individual medley	4:26.99	6 QC	4:26.35	12	did not advance	
Niti Intharapichai	200 m butterfly	2:03.88	33	did not advance			
Dulyarit Phuangthong; Ratapong Sirisanont; Niti Intharapichai; Torlarp Sethsothorn	4 × 100 m medley relay	3:56.80	22	did not advance			

Women

Athlete	Event	Heat		Final B		Final A	
Athlete	Event	Time	Rank	Time	Rank	Time	Rank
Ravee Intporn-Udom	200 m freestyle	2:05.77	31	did not advance			
Ravee Intporn-Udom	400 m freestyle	4:21.93	26	did not advance			
Ravee Intporn-Udom	800 m freestyle	9:01.14	23	did not advance			
Praphalsai Minpraphal	100 m backstroke	1:04.61	21	did not advance			
Praphalsai Minpraphal	200 m backstroke	2:21.82	30	did not advance			
Praphalsai Minpraphal	100 m butterfly	1:03.35	27	did not advance			
Praphalsai Minpraphal	200 m butterfly	2:18.19	25	did not advance			
Praphalsai Minpraphal	200 m individual medley	2:22.34	34	did not advance			
Praphalsai Minpraphal	400 m individual medley	4:58.33	27	did not advance			

== Tennis ==
In total, two Thai athletes participated in the tennis events.

Athlete	Event	Round of 32	Round of 16	Quarterfinals	Semifinals	Final	Rank
Athlete	Event	Opposition Score	Opposition Score	Opposition Score	Opposition Score	Opposition Score	Rank
(WC); Benjamas Sangaram; Tamarine Tanasugarn	Doubles	Christína Papadáki; Christina Zachariadou (GRE); W 2-1 (6-2,6(3)-7,6-2)	Chen Li-Ling; Yi Jing-Qian (CHN); W 2-1 (2-6,6-4,6-4)	Conchita Martínez; Arantxa Sánchez Vicario (ESP); L 0-2 (2-6,1-6)	did not advance		

== Weightlifting ==
In total, one Thai athlete participated in the weightlifting events.

Athlete	Event	Snatch		Clean & Jerk		Total	Rank
Athlete	Event	Result	Rank	Result	Rank	Total	Rank
Nopadol Wanwang	-108 kg	140.0	18th	177.5	17th	317.5	17th
