= Morocco at the 1996 Summer Olympics =

- IOC code: MAR
- NOC: Moroccan Olympic Committee
- Website: www.cnom.org.ma (in French)

in Atlanta
- Competitors: 34 in 7 sports
- Flag bearer: Khalid Skah
- Medals Ranked 68th: Gold 0 Silver 0 Bronze 2 Total 2

Summer Olympics appearances (overview)
- 1960; 1964; 1968; 1972; 1976; 1980; 1984; 1988; 1992; 1996; 2000; 2004; 2008; 2012; 2016; 2020; 2024

Morocco competed at the 1996 Summer Olympics in Atlanta, United States.

== Medalists ==
Medal	Name	Sport	Event	Date
Bronze	Salah Hissou	Athletics	Men's 10,000 metres	29 July
Bronze	Khalid Boulami	Athletics	Men's 5000 metres	3 August

== Competitors ==
The following is the list of number of competitors in the Games.

Sport	Men	Women	Total
Athletics	16	1	17
Boxing	6	–	6
Gymnastics	0	1	1
Judo	3	0	3
Tennis	1	0	1
Weightlifting	1	–	1
Wrestling	5	–	5
Total	32	2	34

== Results by event ==
=== Athletics ===
==== Men ====
Track and road events

Athletes	Events	Heat Round 1		Heat Round 2		Semifinal		Final	
Athletes	Events	Time	Rank	Time	Rank	Time	Rank	Time	Rank
Lahlou Ben Younès	800 metres	1:45.85	8 Q	N/A		1:43.99	4 Q	1:45.52	8
Rachid El-Basir	1500 metres	3:42.85	36	N/A		Did not advance			
Hicham El Guerrouj	1500 metres	3:37.66	10 Q	N/A		3:35.29	8 Q	3:40.75	12
Driss Maazouzi	1500 metres	3:37.08	6 Q	N/A		3:34.35	6 q	3:39.65	10
Khalid Boulami	5000 metres	13:54.72	15 Q	N/A		13:29.72	5 Q	13:08.37	Bronze medal
Brahim Lahlafi	5000 metres	13:51.25	2 Q	N/A		13:27.73	3 Q	13:13.26	8
Ismaïl Sghyr	5000 metres	14:02.71	21 Q	N/A		14:04.23	14 Q	13:22.89	11
Saleh Hissou	10000 metres	27:53.32	5 Q	N/A				27:24.67	Bronze medal
Khalid Skah	10000 metres	28:23.31	16 Q	N/A				27:46.98	7
Larbi Zéroual	10000 metres	Did not finish		N/A				Did not advance	
Abderrahim Ben Redouane	Marathon	N/A						2:30:49	84
Abdelkader El Mouaziz	Marathon	N/A						2:20:39	44
Ali El Tounsi or Ettounsi	Marathon	N/A						2:36:01	98
Hicham Bouaouiche	3000 metres steeplechase	8:31.97	20 Q	N/A		8:27.76	11 Q	8:46.22	11
Brahim Boulami	3000 metres steeplechase	8:30.97	11 Q	N/A		8:20.43	5 Q	8:23.13	7
Abdelaziz Sahère	3000 metres steeplechase	8:26.79	1 Q	N/A		8:33.90	17	Did not advance	

==== Women ====
Track and road events

Athletes	Events	Heat Round 1		Heat Round 2		Semifinal		Final	
Athletes	Events	Time	Rank	Time	Rank	Time	Rank	Time	Rank
Zohra Ouaziz	5000 metres	15:55.03	29	N/A				Did not advance	

=== Boxing ===
Athlete	Event	Round of 32	Round of 16	Quarterfinal	Semifinal	Final
Athlete	Event	Opposition Result	Opposition Result	Opposition Result	Opposition Result	Opposition Result
Hamid Berhili	Light-flyweight	Tetteh (GHA); W 10-5	Yang (CHN); W 14-9	Velasco (PHI); L 20-10	Did not advance	
Mohamed Zbir	Flyweight	Mukuka (ZAM); L 11-4	Did not advance			
Hicham Nafil	Bantamweight	Vernal (COL); W 16-3	Nolasco (DOM); W 18-6	Vichai (THA); L 13-4	Did not advance	
Mohamed Achik	Featherweight	Peden (AUS); L 15-7	Did not advance			
Kabil Lahsen	Welterweight	Hernández (ECU); W 18-9	Santos (PUR); L 16-4	Did not advance		
Mohamed Mesbahi	Middleweight	Borowski (POL); L 9-6	Did not advance			

=== Gymnastics ===
==== Artistic ====
Women

Athlete	Event	Qualification					
Athlete	Event	Apparatus				Total	Rank
Athlete	Event	F	V	UB	BB	Total	Rank
Naima El-Rhouati	Individual	17.387	18.337	17.449	14.681	67.854	74

=== Judo ===
Men

Athlete	Event	Result
Abdel Ouahed Idrissi Chorfi	Extra-Lightweight	17
Adil Bel Gaid	Half-Middleweight	21
Adil Kaaba	Middleweight	21

=== Tennis ===
Men

Athlete	Event	Round of 64		Round of 32		Round of 16		Quarterfinals		Semifinals		Final		
Athlete	Event	Opposition	Score	Opposition	Score	Opposition	Score	Opposition	Score	Opposition	Score	Opposition	Score	Rank
Hicham Arazi	Singles	Rosset (SUI)	L 2-6 3-6	Did not advance										

=== Weightlifting ===
Athletes	Events	Snatch		Clean & jerk		Total	Rank
Athletes	Events	Result	Rank	Result	Rank	Total	Rank
Moustapha Buihamghet	-59 kg	90.0	18	120.0	16	210.0	16

=== Wrestling ===
Greco-Roman

Athlete	Event	Round 1	Round 2	Quarterfinal	Semifinal	Final	Repechage Round 1	Repechage Round 2	Repechage Round 3	Repechage Round 4	Repechage Round 5	Bronze medal Bout
Athlete	Event	Opposition Result	Opposition Result	Opposition Result	Opposition Result	Opposition Result	Opposition Result	Opposition Result	Opposition Result	Opposition Result	Opposition Result	Opposition Result
Anwar Kandafil	-68 kg	Georgiev (BUL); L 10-0	did not advance				N/A	Daynes (CAN); L 5-4	did not advance			
Aziz Khalfi	-74 kg	Zeman (CZE); L 7-0	did not advance				N/A	Tracz (POL); L 9-2	did not advance			
Abdelaziz Essafoui	-90 kg	Fafiński (POL); L 4-0	did not advance				N/A	Houssain (EGY); L 4-0	did not advance			
Mohamed Basri	-100 kg	Damjanović (CRO); L 6-0	did not advance				N/A	Nonomura (JPN); L 10-0	did not advance			
Rashid Belaziz	-130 kg	Johansson (SWE); L 8-0	did not advance				N/A	Ayari (TUN); L 4-2	did not advance			
