= Bulgaria at the 1996 Summer Olympics =

- IOC code: BUL
- NOC: Bulgarian Olympic Committee
- Website: www.bgolympic.org (in Bulgarian and English)

in Atlanta
- Competitors: 110 (74 men and 36 women) in 17 sports
- Flag bearer: Dimo Tonev
- Medals Ranked 22nd: Gold 3 Silver 7 Bronze 5 Total 15

Summer Olympics appearances (overview)
- 1896; 1900–1920; 1924; 1928; 1932; 1936; 1948; 1952; 1956; 1960; 1964; 1968; 1972; 1976; 1980; 1984; 1988; 1992; 1996; 2000; 2004; 2008; 2012; 2016; 2020; 2024

Bulgaria competed at the 1996 Summer Olympics in Atlanta, United States. 110 competitors, 74 men and 36 women, took part in 89 events in 17 sports.

== Medalists ==
Medal	Name	Sport	Event	Date
Gold	Valentin Yordanov	Wrestling	Men's Freestyle Flyweight (52 kg)	2 August
Gold	Stefka Kostadinova	Athletics	Women's high jump	3 August
Gold	Daniel Petrov	Boxing	Men's Light Flyweight	3 August
Silver	Emil Milev	Shooting	Men's 25 metre rapid fire pistol	24 July
Silver	Yoto Yotov	Weightlifting	Men's Middleweight (76 kg)	24 July
Silver	Diana Iorgova	Shooting	Women's 25 metre pistol	26 July
Silver	Krasimir Dunev	Gymnastics	Men's horizontal Bar	28 July
Silver	Tontcho Tontchev	Boxing	Men's Lightweight	3 August
Silver	Serafim Todorov	Boxing	Men's Featherweight	4 August
Silver	Maia Tabakova, Ivelina Taleva, Vjara Vatachka, Ina Deltcheva, Valentina Kevlian, and Maria Koleva	Gymnastics	Women's rhythmic group all-around	5 August
Bronze	Tanyu Kiryakov	Shooting	Men's 10 metre air pistol	20 July
Bronze	Sevdalin Minchev	Weightlifting	Men's Flyweight (54 kg)	20 July
Bronze	Mariya Grozdeva	Shooting	Women's 10 metre air pistol	21 July
Bronze	Nikolay Peshalov	Weightlifting	Men's Bantamweight (59 kg)	21 July
Bronze	Andrian Dushev and Milko Kazanov	Canoeing	Men's K2 1,000 metres Kayak Pairs	3 August

== Archery ==
Bulgaria sent only one archer to Atlanta. He was defeated in the first round.

Athlete	Event	Ranking round		Round of 64	Round of 32	Round of 16	Quarterfinals	Semifinals	Final / BM	
Athlete	Event	Score	Seed	Opposition Score	Opposition Score	Opposition Score	Opposition Score	Opposition Score	Opposition Score	Rank
Stefan Mlyakov	Men's individual	617	62	Oh (KOR); L 156–162	Did not advance					45

== Athletics ==
Men's Long Jump

- Ivaylo Mladenov
  - Qualification — NM (→ did not advance)

Men's Marathon

- Khristo Stefanov — 2:18.29 (→ 30th place)
- Petko Stefanov — 2:29.06 (→ 80th place)

Women's High Jump

- Stefka Kostadinova
  - Qualification — 1.93m
  - Final — 2.05m (→ Gold Medal)
- Venelina Veneva
  - Qualification — 1.80m (→ did not advance)

Women's Javelin Throw

- Sonya Radicheva
  - Qualification — did not start (→ did not advance)

Women's Discus Throw

- Atanaska Angelova
  - Qualification — 59.82m (→ did not advance)

Women's Shot Put

- Svetla Mitkova
  - Qualification — 17.48m (→ did not advance)

Women's Long Jump

- Iva Prandzheva
  - Qualification — 6.62m
  - Final — 6.82m (→ DSQ)

Women's Triple Jump

- Iva Prandzheva
  - Qualification — 14.61m
  - Final — 14.92m (→ DSQ)

== Boxing ==
Men's Flyweight (— 48 kg)

- Daniel Petrov → Gold Medal
  - First Round — Bye
  - Second Round — Defeated Nshan Munchyan (Armenia), 11-5
  - Quarter Finals — Defeated Somrot Kamsing (Thailand), 18-6
  - Semi Finals — Defeated Oleg Kiryukhin (Ukraine), 17-8
  - Final — Defeated Mansueto Velasco (Philippines), 19-6

Men's Flyweight (— 51 kg)

- Yuliyan Strogov
  - First Round — Lost to Damaen Kelly (Ireland), 11-12

Men's Bantamweight (— 54 kg)

- Aleksandar Khristov
  - First Round — Lost to Carlos Barreto (Venezuela), 3-9

Men's Featherweight (— 57 kg)

- Serafim Todorov → Silver Medal
  - First Round — Defeated Yevheniy Shestakov (Ukraine), 11-4
  - Second Round — Defeated Robert Peden (Australia), 20-8
  - Quarter Finals — Defeated Falk Huste (Germany), 14-6
  - Semi Finals — Defeated Floyd Mayweather Jr. (United States), 10-9
  - Final — Lost to Kamsing Somluck (Thailand), 5-8

Men's Lightweight (— 60 kg)

- Tontcho Tontchev → Silver Medal
  - First Round — Defeated Oktavian Taykou (Moldova), referee stopped contest in second round
  - Second Round — Defeated Dennis Zimba (Zambia), 17-9
  - Quarter Finals — Defeated Michael Strange (Canada), 16-10
  - Semi Finals — Defeated Terrance Cauthen (United States), 15-12
  - Final — Lost to Hocine Soltani (Algeria), 3-3 (referee decision)

Men's Light Welterweight (— 63,5 kg)

- Radoslav Suslekov
  - First Round — Lost to Babak Moghimi (Iran), 3-11

== Diving ==
Women's 10m Platform

- Radoslava Georgieva
  - Semi Finals — 402.54 pt(→ 16th place)

== Fencing ==
Three fencers, one man and two women, represented Bulgaria in 1996.

Men's épée

- Iliya Mechkov

Women's foil

- Anna Angelova
- Ivana Georgieva

== Swimming ==
Men's 100m Butterfly

- Denislav Kalchev
  - Heat — 54.81 (→ did not advance, 26th place)

Men's 200m Individual Medley

- Denislav Kalchev
  - Heat — 2:08.16 (→ did not advance, 30th place)

== Tennis ==
Athlete	Event	1st Round	2nd Round	3rd Round	Quarter-finals	Semi-finals	Final
Athlete	Event	Opposition Score	Opposition Score	Opposition Score	Opposition Score	Opposition Score	Opposition Score
Magdalena Maleeva	Women's Singles	Stubbs (AUS); W 6–2, 6-1	Labat (ARG); W 7–6, 6-1	Date (JPN); L 4–6, 4-6	Did not advance		

== Volleyball ==
=== Men's Indoor Team Competition ===
- Preliminary Round (Group A)
  - Lost to Cuba (0-3)
  - Defeated Brazil (3-0)
  - Lost to Argentina (1-3)
  - Defeated Poland (3-0)
  - Defeated United States (3-2)
- Quarterfinals
  - Lost to Netherlands (1-3)
- Classification Matches
  - 5th/8th place: Lost to Cuba (1-3)
  - 7th/8th place: Defeated Argentina (3-1) → 7th place
- Team Roster
  - Lubomir Ganev
  - Ivaylo Gavrilov
  - Plamen Hristov
  - Evgeni Ivanov
  - Nikolay Ivanov
  - Plamen Konstantinov
  - Lyudmil Naydenov
  - Nayden Naydenov
  - Petar Ouzounov
  - Martin Stoev
  - Dimo Tonev (captain)
  - Nikolay Jeliazkov

== Weightlifting ==
Men's Light-Heavyweight

- Krastu Milev
  - Final — 160.0 + 200.0 = 360.0 (→ 8th place)
