= 1996 Summer Olympics Parade of Nations =

During the Parade of Nations portion of the 1996 Summer Olympics opening ceremony, athletes from each country participating in the Olympics paraded in the arena, preceded by their flag. The flag was borne by a sportsperson from that country chosen either by the National Olympic Committee or by the athletes themselves to represent their country.

== Parade order ==
As the nation of the first modern Olympic Games, Greece entered the stadium first; whereas, the host nation of the United States marched last. Other countries entered in alphabetical order in the language of the host country (English), according with tradition and IOC guidelines.

Whilst most countries entered under their short names, a few entered under more formal or alternative names, mostly due to political and naming disputes. Macedonia entered as "The Former Yugoslav Republic of Macedonia'" because of the naming dispute with Greece. The Republic of China (commonly known as Taiwan) entered with the compromised name and flag of "Chinese Taipei" under T so that they did not enter together with conflicting People's Republic of China (commonly known as China), which entered as the "People's Republic of China" under C. The Republic of the Congo entered as just "Congo" while the Democratic Republic of Congo entered under its former name, Zaire. Iran, Moldova, Laos, Brunei and the United States all entered under their formal names, respectively "Islamic Republic of Iran", "Republic of Moldova", "Lao People's Democratic Republic", "Brunei Darussalam" and "United States of America".

A record of 197 nations entered the stadium with a combined total of 10,318 athletes. Twenty-four nations made their Olympic debut, including eleven of the former Soviet republics, namely Armenia, Azerbaijan, Belarus, Georgia, Kazakhstan, Kyrgyzstan, Moldova, Tajikistan, Turkmenistan, Ukraine, and Uzbekistan, that had previously competed as part of the Unified Team in 1992 and Soviet Union before that. Russia competed independently for the first time since 1912. Czech Republic and Slovakia attended the Games independently for the first time since the breakup of Czechoslovakia in 1993, whereas Cambodia returned officially after its 24-year absence under the Khmer Republic.

Notable flag bearers in the opening ceremony featured the following athletes: weightlifter Pyrros Dimas (Greece); eventing rider Andrew Hoy (Australia); nine-time Olympian and Star sailor Hubert Raudaschl (Austria); 1984 Olympic middle-distance champion Joaquim Cruz (Brazil) in the 800 metres; track sprinters Charmaine Crooks (Canada) and Marie-José Pérec (France); defending Olympic long-distance champions Derartu Tulu (Ethiopia) and Khalid Skah (Morocco), both in the 10,000 metres; fencers Arnd Schmitt (Germany), Bence Szabó (Hungary), and Giovanna Trillini (Italy); rowing legend Steve Redgrave (Great Britain); swimmers Raimundas Mažuolis (Lithuania) in sprint freestyle and Rafał Szukała (Poland) in the butterfly; windsurfer Barbara Kendall (New Zealand); hurdler and world champion Brigita Bukovec (Slovenia); defending Olympic champions Jan-Ove Waldner (Sweden) in men's table tennis singles, and Andrey Abduvaliyev (Tajikistan) in the hammer throw; pole vaulter and world record holder Sergey Bubka (Ukraine); and super heavyweight wrestlers Alexander Karelin (Russia) in Greco-Roman, and Bruce Baumgartner (United States) in freestyle.

== List ==
The following is a list of each country's announced flag bearer. The list is sorted by the order in which each nation appears in the parade of nations. The names are given in their official designations by the IOC.

Order	Country	Flag bearer	Sport
1	Greece	Pyrros Dimas	Weightlifting
2	Afghanistan	Muhamed Aman	Boxing
3	Albania	Mirela Manjani	Athletics
4	Algeria	Karim El-Mahouab	Handball
5	American Samoa	Maselino Masoe	Boxing
6	Andorra	Aitor Osorio	Swimming
7	Angola	Palmira de Almeida	Handball
8	Antigua & Barbuda	Heather Samuel	Athletics
9	Argentina	Carolina Mariani	Judo
10	Armenia	Aghvan Grigoryan	Weightlifting
11	Aruba	Isnardo Faro	Weightlifting
12	Australia	Andrew Hoy	Equestrian
13	Austria	Hubert Raudaschl	Sailing
14	Azerbaijan	Nazim Huseynov	Judo
15	Bahamas	Frank Rutherford	Athletics
16	Bahrain	Mohamed Al-Sala	Sailing
17	Bangladesh	Saiful Alam	Shooting
18	Barbados	Obadele Thompson	Athletics
19	Belarus	Aleksey Medvedev	Wrestling
20	Belgium	Jean-Michel Saive	Table tennis
21	Belize	Eugène Muslar	Athletics
22	Benin	Laure Kuetey	Athletics
23	Bermuda	Brian Wellman	Athletics
24	Bhutan	Jubzhang Jubzhang	Archery
25	Bolivia	Policarpio Calizaya	Athletics
26	Bosnia & Herzegovina	Islam Ðugum	Athletics
27	Botswana	Justice Dipeba	Athletics
28	Brazil	Joaquim Cruz	Athletics
29	British Virgin Islands	Keita Cline	Athletics
30	Brunei Darussalam	Jefri Bolkiah	Shooting
31	Bulgaria	Dimo Tonev	Volleyball
32	Burkina Faso	Franck Zio	Athletics
33	Burundi	Dieudonné Kwizéra	Athletics
34	Cambodia	To Rithya	Athletics
35	Cameroon	Georgette Nkoma	Athletics
36	Canada	Charmaine Crooks	Athletics
37	Cape Verde	Manuel Jesús Rodrígues	Volleyball (official)
38	Cayman Islands	Carson Ebanks	Sailing
39	Central African Republic	Mickaël Conjungo	Athletics
40	Chad	Kaltouma Nadjina	Athletics
41	Chile	Sebastian Keitel	Athletics
42	People's Republic of China	Liu Yudong	Basketball
43	Colombia	Marlon Pérez Arango	Cycling
44	Comoros	Faissoil Ben Daoud	Athletics (coach)
45	Congo	Léontine Tsiba	Athletics
46	Cook Islands	Sam Nunuke Pera	Weightlifting
47	Costa Rica	Henry Núñez	Judo
48	Côte d'Ivoire	Jean-Olivier Zirignon	Athletics
49	Croatia	Perica Bukić	Water polo
50	Cuba	Rolando Tucker	Fencing
51	Cyprus	Antonakis Andreou	Shooting
52	Czech Republic	Václav Chalupa	Rowing
53	Denmark	Thomas Stuer-Lauridsen	Badminton
54	Djibouti	Hussein Ahmed Salah	Athletics
55	Dominica	Jérôme Romain	Athletics
56	Dominican Republic	Joan Guzmán	Boxing
57	Ecuador	Felipe Delgado	Swimming
58	Egypt	Hosam Abdallah	Handball
59	El Salvador	Juan Vargas	Judo
60	Equatorial Guinea	Gustavo Envela Mahua	Athletics
61	Estonia	Jüri Jaanson	Rowing
62	Ethiopia	Derartu Tulu	Athletics
63	Fiji	Jone Delai	Athletics
64	Finland	Mikko Kolehmainen	Canoeing
65	The Former Yugoslav Republic of Macedonia	Vladimir Bogdevski	Handball (referee)
66	France	Marie-José Pérec	Athletics
67	Gabon	Roger Oyembo	Chef de mission
68	Gambia	Dawda Jallow	Athletics
69	Georgia	Giorgi Kandelaki	Boxing
70	Germany	Arnd Schmitt	Fencing
71	Ghana	Moro Tijani	Boxing
72	Great Britain	Steve Redgrave	Rowing
73	Grenada	Jason Charter	Athletics (coach)
74	Guam	Patrick Sagisi	Swimming
75	Guatemala	Attila Solti	Shooting
76	Guinea	Joseph Loua	Athletics
77	Guinea-Bissau	Talata Embalo	Wrestling
78	Guyana	John Douglas	Boxing
79	Haiti	Adler Volmar	Judo
80	Honduras	Darwin Angeles	Boxing
81	Hong Kong	Chan Sau Ying	Athletics
82	Hungary	Bence Szabó	Fencing
83	Iceland	Jón Arnar Magnússon	Athletics
84	India	Pargat Singh	Field hockey
85	Indonesia	Hendrik Simangunsong	Boxing
86	Islamic Republic of Iran	Lida Fariman	Shooting
87	Iraq	Raed Ahmed	Weightlifting
88	Ireland	Francie Barrett	Boxing
89	Israel	Lydia Hatuel	Fencing
90	Italy	Giovanna Trillini	Fencing
91	Jamaica	Juliet Cuthbert	Athletics
92	Japan	Ryoko Tamura	Judo
93	Jordan	Walid Al-Awazem	Judo (referee)
94	Kazakhstan	Yermakhan Ibraimov	Boxing
95	Kenya	Paul Tergat	Athletics
96	Korea	Choi Cheon-Sik	Volleyball
97	Kuwait	Abdullah Al-Rashidi	Shooting
98	Kyrgyzstan	Sergey Ashihmin	Swimming
99	Lao People's Democratic Republic	Thongdy Amnouayphone	Athletics
100	Latvia	Einārs Tupurītis	Athletics
101	Lebanon	Mohamed Al-Aywan	Weightlifting
102	Lesotho	Jassie Mathunta	Chef de mission
103	Liberia	Kouty Mawenh	Athletics
104	Libyan Arab Jamahiriya	Mehdi Abdulkheirat	Official
105	Liechtenstein	Birgit Blum	Judo
106	Lithuania	Raimundas Mažuolis	Swimming
107	Luxembourg	Anne Kremer	Tennis
108	Madagascar	Dally Randriantefy	Tennis
109	Malawi	John Mwathiwa	Athletics
110	Malaysia	Nor Saiful Zaini	Field hockey
111	Maldives	Ahmed Shageef	Athletics
112	Mali	Monique Ross	Envoy
113	Malta	Carol Galea	Athletics
114	Mauritania	Noureddine Ould Ménira (Note: Ménira claimed he never actually got to hold the flag, as national officials gave it to another unidentified individual.)	Athletics
115	Mauritius	Khemraj Naïko	Athletics
116	Mexico	Nancy Contreras	Cycling
117	Republic of Moldova	Vadim Vacarciuc	Weightlifting
118	Monaco	Thierry Vatrican	Judo
119	Mongolia	Dolgorsürengiin Sumyaabazar	Wrestling
120	Morocco	Khalid Skah	Athletics
121	Mozambique	Maria de Lurdes Mutola	Athletics
122	Myanmar	Soe Myint	Shooting
123	Namibia	Friedhelm Sack	Shooting
124	Nauru	Marcus Stephen	Weightlifting
125	Nepal	Tika Bogati	Athletics
126	Netherlands	Nico Rienks	Rowing
127	Netherlands Antilles	Sergio Murray	Judo
128	New Zealand	Barbara Kendall	Sailing
129	Nicaragua	Walter Martínez	Shooting
130	Niger	Abdou Manzo	Athletics
131	Nigeria	Mary Onyali-Omagbemi	Athletics
132	Norway	Linda Andersen	Sailing
133	Oman	Khalaf Al-Khatri	Shooting
134	Pakistan	Mansoor Ahmed	Field hockey
135	Palestine	Majed Abu Maraheel	Athletics
136	Panama	Eileen Coparropa	Swimming
137	Papua New Guinea	Subul Babo	Athletics
138	Paraguay	Ramón Jiménez Gaona	Athletics
139	Democratic People's Republic of Korea	Chae Ra-U	Table tennis (referee)
140	Peru	Juan Giha	Shooting
141	Philippines	Reynaldo Galido	Boxing
142	Poland	Rafał Szukała	Swimming
143	Portugal	Fernanda Ribeiro	Athletics
144	Puerto Rico	Ivelisse Echevarría	Softball
145	Qatar	Ibrahim Ismail Muftah	Athletics
146	Romania	Iulică Ruican	Rowing
147	Russian Federation	Alexander Karelin	Wrestling
148	Rwanda	Parfait Ntukamyagwe	Athletics (coach)
149	Saint Kitts & Nevis	Diane Dunrod-Francis	Athletics
150	Saint Lucia	Michelle Baptiste	Athletics
151	Saint Vincent & the Grenadines	Eswort Coombs	Athletics
152	San Marino	Manlio Molinari	Athletics
153	São Tomé & Príncipe	Sortelina Pires	Athletics
154	Saudi Arabia	Khaled Al-Khalidi	Athletics
155	Senegal	Ibou Faye	Athletics
156	Seychelles	Rival Cadeau	Boxing
157	Sierra Leone	Eunice Barber	Athletics
158	Singapore	Lee Wung Yew	Shooting
159	Slovakia	Jozef Lohyňa	Wrestling
160	Slovenia	Brigita Bukovec	Athletics
161	Solomon Islands	Joseph Onika	Athletics (coach)
162	Somalia	Abdi Bile	Athletics
163	South Africa	Masibulele Makepula	Boxing
164	Spain	Luis Doreste	Sailing
165	Sri Lanka	Sriyani Kulawansa	Athletics
166	Sudan	Mahmoud Musa Abdullah	Athletics (coach)
167	Suriname	Enrico Linscheer	Swimming
168	Swaziland	Daniel Sibandze	Athletics
169	Sweden	Jan-Ove Waldner	Table tennis
170	Switzerland	Stefan Schärer	Handball
171	Syrian Arab Republic	Ghada Shouaa	Athletics
172	Chinese Taipei	Tu Tsai-hsing	Shooting
173	Tajikistan	Andrey Abduvaliyev	Athletics
174	United Republic of Tanzania	Ikaji Salum	Athletics
175	Thailand	Vissanu Sophanich	Athletics
176	Togo	Téko Folligan	Athletics
177	Tonga	Paea Wolfgramm	Boxing
178	Trinidad & Tobago	Gene Samuel	Cycling
179	Tunisia	Iskander Hachicha	Judo
180	Turkey	Derya Büyükuncu	Swimming
181	Turkmenistan	Rozy Rejepov	Wrestling
182	Uganda	Mary Musoke	Table tennis
183	Ukraine	Sergey Bubka	Athletics
184	United Arab Emirates	Nabil Abdul Tahlak	Shooting
185	Uruguay	Marcelo Filippini	Tennis
186	Uzbekistan	Timur Ibragimov	Boxing
187	Vanuatu	Tawai Keiruan	Athletics
188	Venezuela	Francisco Sánchez	Swimming
189	Vietnam	Nguyễn Hữu Huy	Judo (coach)
190	Virgin Islands	Lisa Neuburger	Sailing
191	Western Samoa	Bob Gasio	Boxing
192	Yemen	Abdullah Al-Izani	Wrestling
193	Yugoslavia	Igor Milanović	Water polo
194	Zaire	Lukengu Ngalula	Basketball
195	Zambia	Davis Mwale	Boxing
196	Zimbabwe	Tendai Chimusasa	Athletics
197	United States of America	Bruce Baumgartner	Wrestling

== See also ==
- 1992 Summer Olympics national flag bearers
- 2000 Summer Olympics national flag bearers
- 1994 Winter Olympics national flag bearers
