= 1994 Asian Junior Athletics Championships =

5th Asian Junior Championships
- Dates: 17 – 20 September
- Host city: Jakarta, Indonesia
- Level: Junior (under-20)
- Events: 41

The 1994 Asian Junior Athletics Championships was the fifth edition of the international athletics competition for Asian under-20 athletes, organised by the Asian Athletics Association. It took place from 17–20 September in Jakarta, Indonesia. It was the second time that the Indonesian capital had hosted the competition, following on from the first edition in 1986. A total of 41 events were contested, 22 for male athletes and 19 for female athletes.

== Medal summary ==
=== Men ===
Event	Gold		Silver		Bronze	
100 metres	Worasit Vechaprutti; Thailand	10.43	Sayan Namwong; Thailand	10.45	Sultan Mohamed Al-Sheib; Qatar	10.49
200 metres	Worasit Vechaprutti; Thailand	21.07	Sultan Mohamed Al-Sheib; Qatar	21.19	Reanchai Srihawong; Thailand	21.49
400 metres	Siddarth Basak; India	48.11	Tsunemichi Shimaki; Japan	48.21	Amnuay Boonta; Thailand	48.36
800 metres	Abdul Rahman Abdullah; Qatar	1:50.83	Takeshi Gobara; Japan	1:50.84	Bai Wentao; China	1:51.58
1500 metres	Yin Changxi; China	3:49.95	Malkiat Singh; India	3:50.25	Bashir Boushra; Qatar	3:50.41
5000 metres	Xia Fengyuan; China	14:29.39	Satoshi Osaki; Japan	14:38.38	O Seong-Geun; South Korea	14:40.15
10,000 metres	Ferry Junaedi; Indonesia	31:13.17	Mohamed Al-Oqadi; Saudi Arabia	31:51.52	Than Tun Lwin; Myanmar	32:01.42
110 metres hurdles	Khassif Mubarak; Qatar	14.28 =CR	Andrey Sklyarenko; Kazakhstan	14.45	Chen Chung-Hsiang; Chinese Taipei	14.50
400 metres hurdles	Mubarak Al-Nubi; Qatar	51.21	Hamad Al-Dosari; Qatar	51.44	Kazumasa Okemoro; Japan	51.76
3000 metres steeplechase	Tadayuki Ojima; Japan	8:55.51	Hiroyuki Yamamoto; Japan	8:56.38	Awad Saleh Nasser; Yemen	8:57.43
4×100 m relay	Thailand (THA); Kongdech Natenee; Reanchai Srihawong; Worasit Vechaprutti; Sayan Namwong	39.66	Japan (JPN)	40.81	Malaysia (MAS)	41.06
4×400 m relay	Japan (JPN)	3:11.22	India (IND)	3:12.42	Qatar (QAT)	3:13.92
10,000 metres walk	Wang Yuhong; China	45:46.33	Sudhir Kumar; India	45:52.36	Eryan Myrzabekov; Kazakhstan	45:57.48
High jump	Noriyasu Arai; Japan	2.17 m	Fu Ye; China	2.15 m	Bae Gyeong-Ho; South Korea	2.08 m
Pole vault	Tatsuya Sugaya; Japan	4.80 m	Ahmed Mohamed Yousef; Qatar	4.60 m	Kiyonobo Kigoshi; Japan	4.60 m
Long jump	Abdul Rahman Al-Nubi; Qatar	7.79 m (w)	Chen Jing; China	7.77 m	Said Mahboud; Qatar	7.56 m (w)
Triple jump	Aleksandr Tumanov; Turkmenistan	15.68 m	Rustam Khusnutdinov; Uzbekistan	15.58 m	Chen Chung-Chien; Chinese Taipei	15.20 m
Shot put	Jagbir Singh; India	16.89 m	Gurpreet Singh; India	16.46 m	Shao Wei; China	16.31 m
Discus throw	Rajiv Singh Kumar; India	49.34 m	Vansavang Savatdee; Thailand	44.46 m	Mohamed Al-Majid; Qatar	42.92 m
Hammer throw	Shigeru Hirao; Japan	61.44 m	Shubdip Singh Mann; India	60.12 m	Ho Chin-Hsien; Chinese Taipei	59.72 m
Javelin throw	Wang Weichun; China	72.74 m	Hur Sung-Min; South Korea	71.88 m	Sergey Voynov; Uzbekistan	71.86 m
Decathlon	Chen Chien-Hung; Chinese Taipei	6773 pts	Yoshinori Maehara; Japan	6476 pts	Jin Sung-Ryon; South Korea	6347 pts

=== Women ===
Event	Gold		Silver		Bronze	
100 metres	Damayanthi Dharsha; Sri Lanka	11.42 CR	Susanthika Jayasinghe; Sri Lanka	11.49	Gao Chunxia; China	11.54
200 metres	Susanthika Jayasinghe; Sri Lanka	23.16 CR	Damayanthi Dharsha; Sri Lanka	23.24	Yan Jiankui; China	23.84
400 metres	Jiang Lanying; China	53.83	Xue Meiwang; China	55.21	K. M. Beenamol; India	55.62
800 metres	Huang Lixing; China	2:05.11	K. M. Beenamol; India	2:08.36	Seo Hee-Gu; South Korea	2:09.07
1500 metres	Zhang Jinqing; China	4:30.51	Seo Hee-Gu; South Korea	4:31.29	Yumiko Okamoto; Japan	4:32.95
3000 metres	Wang Chunmei; China	9:33.78	Yumiko Okamoto; Japan	9:35.10	Tomoko Morigaki; Japan	9:35.40
5000 metres	Naomi Sakashita; Japan	16:19.58 CR	Hyun Hee-Park; South Korea	16:47.46	Ruwiyati; Indonesia	17:26.23
100 metres hurdles	Fan Min-Hua; Chinese Taipei	14.24	Yelena Timochkova; Kazakhstan	14.27	Sakiko Miyamoto; Japan	14.30
400 metres hurdles	Mayuko Hiro; Japan	59.38	Svetlana Badrankova; Kazakhstan	59.75	Wang Pei-shun; Chinese Taipei	60.39
4×100 m relay	China (CHN); Gao Chunxia; Yen; Feng Jie; Wang Jing	44.75 CR	Thailand (THA)	45.96 CR	Chinese Taipei (TPE)	46.21
4×400 m relay	China (CHN)	3:42.30	Thailand (THA)	3:43.38	India (IND)	3:43.69
5000 metres walk	Wei Linkun; China	24:16.39	Ryoko Sakakura; Japan	24:26.08	Kim Dan-oh; South Korea	26:35.91
High jump	Lin Su-chi; Chinese Taipei	1.82 m	Tang Li-wen; Chinese Taipei	1.82 m	Miyuki Aoyama; Japan	1.76 m
Long jump	Feng Jie; China	6.32 m	Kim Hyo-in; South Korea	5.93 m	Sakiko Miyamoto; Japan	5.90 m
Triple jump	Luo Jun; China	13.33 m	Olga Voronina; Uzbekistan	12.85 m	Olga Likhatova; Kazakhstan	12.37 m
Shot put	Chen Huifen; China	15.58 m	Iolanta Ulyeva; Kazakhstan	14.29 m	Yoko Toyonaga; Japan	14.18 m
Discus throw	Qin Lei; China	52.72 m	Mari Takama; Japan	46.12 m	Swaranjeet Kaur; India	45.08 m
Javelin throw	Ma Linuo; China	51.26 m	Fang En-hua; Chinese Taipei	48.92 m	Norie Takahashi; Japan	47.66 m
Heptathlon	Lin Chao-hsiu; Chinese Taipei	5283 pts	Zhang Junling; China	5131 pts	Anna Geidelbakh; Kazakhstan	4621 pts

== 1994 Medal Table ==
Rank	Nation	Gold	Silver	Bronze	Total
1	China (CHN)	16	4	4	24
2	Japan (JPN)	7	9	9	25
3	Qatar (QAT)	4	3	5	12
4	Chinese Taipei (TPE)	4	2	5	11
5	India (IND)	3	6	3	12
6	Thailand (THA)	3	4	2	9
7	Sri Lanka (SRI)	2	2	0	4
8	Indonesia (INA)	1	0	1	2
9	Turkmenistan (TKM)	1	0	0	1
10	South Korea (KOR)	0	4	5	9
11	Kazakhstan (KAZ)	0	4	3	7
12	Uzbekistan (UZB)	0	2	1	3
13	Saudi Arabia (KSA)	0	1	0	1
14	Malaysia (MAS)	0	0	1	1
14	Myanmar (MYA)	0	0	1	1
14	Yemen (YEM)	0	0	1	1
Totals (16 entries)		41	41	41	123
