= Nshan Munchyan =

Armenian boxer (born 1963)

Personal information
- Nationality: Armenian
- Born: Nshan Munchyan; June 24, 1963 (age 63) Yerevan, Armenian SSR

Boxing career
- Weight class: Light Flyweight

Boxing record
- Total fights: 29
- Wins: 16
- Win by KO: 13
- Losses: 0

Nshan Munchyan
Medal record

Representing Armenia

Men's Boxing

World Amateur Championships
Gold medal – first place	1993 Tampere	Light Flyweight

World Cup
Gold medal – first place	1994 Bangkok	Light Flyweight

Representing Soviet Union

World Amateur Championships
Bronze medal – third place	1989 Moscow	Light Flyweight

European Amateur Championships
Gold medal – first place	1987 Turin	Light Flyweight
Bronze medal – third place	1989 Athens	Light Flyweight

Goodwill Games
Gold medal – first place	1986 Moscow	Light Flyweight
Bronze medal – third place	1990 Seattle	Light Flyweight

Nshan Munchyan (Armenian: Նշան Մունչյան, born June 24, 1963, in Yerevan, Armenian SSR) is a retired Armenian boxer. He is a former World, European, four-time Soviet and multi-time Armenian Champion.

== Biography ==
Nshan started boxing in Armenia in 1976. He began boxing under the Soviet Union. Munchyan won a gold medal at the 1987 European Amateur Boxing Championships. After the Union's fall in 1991, Munchyan began representing his native Armenia. He won a gold medal at the 1993 World Amateur Boxing Championships and a gold medal at the 1994 World Cup. He is the first boxer from the independent Armenia to win a medal in either competition.

Munchyan competed at the 1996 Summer Olympics where, after receiving a first round bye, he lost to Daniel Petrov, whom he previously defeated at the 1993 World Championships finals. Petrov went on to win the Olympic gold medal.

He is married and has three children.

=== Olympic Games Results ===
1996

- 1st round bye
- Lost to Daniel Petrov (Bulgaria) 5-11

=== World Amateur Championships Results ===
1986

- Lost to Luis Rolon (Puerto Rico) 1-4

1989

- Defeated Leszek Olszewski (Poland) RSC 1
- Defeated Erdenentsogt Tsogtjargal (Mongolia) 17-9
- Lost to Rogelio Marcelo (Cuba) 20-23

1993

- Defeated Bernard Inom (France) 23-9
- Defeated Eduard Gaifulin (Russia) 11-0
- Defeated Albert Guardado (United States) 7-2
- Defeated Daniel Petrov (Bulgaria) 8-6

1995

- Defeated Pal Lakatos (Hungary) 11-11
- Lost to Andrzej Rzany (Poland) 6-6

=== European Championships Results ===
1987

- 1st round bye
- Defeated Robert Isaszegi (Hungary) 5-0
- Defeated Adrian Amzer (Romania) 5-0
- Defeated Krasimir Cholakov (Bulgaria) 4-1

1989

- Defeated Luigi Castiglione (Italy) 4-1
- Lost to Robert Isaszegi (Hungary) DQ 3

1991

- Defeated Jan Quast (Germany) 25-20
- Lost to Pal Lakatos (Hungary) 19-23

=== World Cup Results ===
1994

- Defeated Bulat Jumadilov (Kazakhstan) 12-8
- Defeated Bernard Inom (France) 13-8
- Defeated Pramunasak Phosuwan (Thailand) 11-6
- Defeated Rafael Lozano (Spain) 15-6
