= Rafael Lozano (boxer, born 1970) =

Spanish boxer (born 1970)

Personal information
- Full name: Rafael Lozano Muñoz
- Nickname: Balita
- Nationality: Spain
- Born: 24 January 1970 (age 56) Córdoba, Andalusia, Spain
- Height: 1.50 m (4 ft 11 in)
- Weight: 48 kg (106 lb)
- Children: Rafael Lozano Serrano

Sport
- Sport: Boxing
- Weight class: Light Flyweight
- Club: Boxing Club Córdoba
Medal record
Olympic Games
Silver medal – second place	2000 Sydney	Light Flyweight
Bronze medal – third place	1996 Atlanta	Light Flyweight
European Championships
Bronze medal – third place	1996 Vejle	Light Flyweight
Mediterranean Games
Bronze medal – third place	1991 Athens	Light Flyweight
Silver medal – second place	1993 Languedoc- Roussillion	Light Flyweight
Bronze medal – third place	1997 Bari	Light Flyweight

Rafael Lozano Muñoz (born 25 January 1970 in Córdoba, Andalusia) is a former boxer from Spain.

== Professional career ==
Known as "Balita", Lozano turned pro in 2001. In 2006, he challenged Brahim Asloum for the WBA Intercontinental Flyweight Title (lost on TKO).

== Amateur career ==
- 1992 – Participated in the Summer Olympics (light flyweight)
  - Defeated Fana Thwala (South Africa) points
  - Defeated Eric Griffin (United States) points
  - Lost to Rogelio Marcelo (Cuba) points
- 1996 – Bronze Medal at the European Amateur Boxing Championships (Light Flyweight) in Vejle, Denmark
  - Defeated Yaşar Giritli (Turkey) points
  - Defeated Peter Baláž (Slovakia) points
  - Lost to Oleg Kiryukhin (Ukraine) points
- 1996 – Bronze medal at the Summer Olympics (light flyweight) in Atlanta, Georgia
  - Defeated Joseph Benhard (Namibia) points
  - Defeated Masibulele Makepula (South Africa) points
  - Defeated Masara La Paene (Indonesia) points
  - Lost to Mansueto Velasco (Philippines) points
- 2000 – Silver Medal at the Summer Olympics (light flyweight) in Sydney, Australia
  - Defeated Danilo Lerio (Philippines) points
  - Defeated Suleiman Bilali (Kenya) points
  - Defeated Kim Un-Chol (North Korea) points
  - Lost to Brahim Asloum (France) points
