= 1995 World Amateur Boxing Championships =

Boxing competitions

1995 AIBA World Boxing Championships
- Venue: Deutschlandhalle
- Location: Berlin, Germany
- Start date: May 4, 1995
- End date: May 15, 1995

The Men's 1995 World Amateur Boxing Championships were held in the Deutschlandhalle in Berlin, Germany from May 4 to May 15. The eighth edition of this competition, held a year before the Summer Olympics in Atlanta, Georgia, was organised by the world governing body for amateur boxing AIBA. These World Championships saw the introduction of 'seedings' in each weight. Those seedings were to be based on the 1994 AIBA ranking list.

== Medal winners ==
Event	Gold	Silver	Bronze
Light Flyweight (– 48 kilograms)	Daniel Petrov; Bulgaria	Bernard Inom; France	Hamid Berhili; Morocco Juan Ramírez; Cuba
Flyweight (– 51 kilograms)	Zoltan Lunka; Germany	Bulat Jumadilov; Kazakhstan	Raúl Gonzáles; Cuba Joni Turunen; Finland
Bantamweight (– 54 kilograms)	Raimkul Malakhbekov; Russia	Robert Ciba; Poland	Dirk Krüger; Germany Artur Mikaelyan; Armenia
Featherweight (– 57 kilograms)	Serafim Todorov; Bulgaria	Noureddine Medjehoud; Algeria	Vitas Bičiulaitis; Lithuania Falk Huste; Germany
Lightweight (– 60 kilograms)	Leonard Doroftei; Romania	Bruno Wartelle; France	Marco Rudolph; Germany Pablo Rojas; Cuba
Light Welterweight (– 63,5 kilograms)	Héctor Vinent; Cuba	Nurhan Süleymanoğlu; Turkey	Radoslav Suslekov; Bulgaria Oktay Urkal; Germany
Welterweight (– 67 kilograms)	Juan Hernández Sierra; Cuba	Oleg Saitov; Russia	Vitalijus Karpačiauskas; Lithuania Andreas Otto; Germany
Light Middleweight (– 71 kilograms)	Francisc Vaştag; Romania	Alfredo Duvergel; Cuba	(Federal Republic of Yugoslavia) Slaviša Popović; Yugoslavia Markus Beyer; Germany
Middleweight (– 75 kilograms)	Ariel Hernández; Cuba	Tomasz Borowski; Poland	Mohamed Mesbahi; Morocco Dilshod Yarbekov; Uzbekistan
Light Heavyweight (– 81 kilograms)	Antonio Tarver; United States	Diosvany Vega; Cuba	Thomas Ulrich; Germany Vassiliy Jirov; Kazakhstan
Heavyweight (– 91 kilograms)	Félix Savón; Cuba	Luan Krasniqi; Germany	Christophe Mendy; France Sinan Şamil Sam; Turkey
Super Heavyweight (+ 91 kilograms)	Alexei Lezin; Russia	Vitali Klitschko; Ukraine	René Monse; Germany Lawrence Clay-Bey; United States

== Medal table ==
Rank	Nation	Gold	Silver	Bronze	Total
1	Cuba (CUB)	4	2	3	9
2	Russia (RUS)	2	1	0	3
3	Bulgaria (BUL)	2	0	1	3
4	Romania (ROU)	2	0	0	2
5	Germany (GER)	1	1	8	10
6	United States (USA)	1	0	1	2
7	France (FRA)	0	2	1	3
8	Poland (POL)	0	2	0	2
9	Kazakhstan (KAZ)	0	1	1	2
9	Turkey (TUR)	0	1	1	2
11	Algeria (ALG)	0	1	0	1
11	Ukraine (UKR)	0	1	0	1
13	Morocco (MAR)	0	0	2	2
13	Uzbekistan (UZB)	0	0	2	2
15	Armenia (ARM)	0	0	1	1
15	FR Yugoslavia (FRY)	0	0	1	1
15	Finland (FIN)	0	0	1	1
15	Lithuania (LTU)	0	0	1	1
Totals (18 entries)		12	12	24	48
