= Hamad Mubarak Al-Dosari =

Qatari hurdler

Medal record

Men's athletics

Representing Qatar

Asian Championships
Bronze medal – third place	1998 Fukuoka	4×100 m

Hamad Mubarak Al-Dosari (born 24 December 1977) is a retired Qatari hurdler who specialized in the 110 metres hurdles. He also competed internationally in the 400 metres hurdles as well as relay.

As a junior he won the silver medal in the 400 metres hurdles at the 1994 Asian Junior Championships. In the same year he won a bronze medal in the 4 × 400 metres relay at the 1994 Asian Games, and the Qatari team also competed, but did not finish, at the 1996 World Junior Championships.

Khasif won silver medals at the 1995 and 1997 Arab Championships. At the 1998 Asian Games he won the bronze medal in the 110 metres hurdles and was disqualified in the 4 × 100 metres relay. At the 1998 Asian Championships he finished fourth in the 110 metres hurdles and won a bronze medal in the 4 × 400 metres relay. He also competed in the 4 × 400 metres relay at the 1996 Olympic Games without reaching the final.

His personal best time was 13.89 seconds, achieved at the 1998 Asian Championships in Fukuoka.
