= Dmitry Vybornov =

Russian boxer

Personal information
- Native name: Дмитрий Борисович Выборнов
- Full name: Dmitry Borisovich Vybornov
- Nationality: Russia
- Born: 23 February 1970 (age 56)
- Height: 1.88 m (6 ft 2 in)
- Weight: 81 kg (179 lb)

Sport
- Sport: Boxing
- Weight class: Super Heavyweight
- Club: Central Sport Klub Army, Samara
Medal record
European Amateur Championships
| Bronze medal – third place | 1996 Vejle | Light Heavyweight |

Dmitry Borisovich Vybornov (Russian: Дмитрий Борисович Выборнов; born 23 February 1970) is a retired male boxer from Russia. He represented his native country at the 1996 Summer Olympics in Atlanta, Georgia, where he was stopped in the first round of the men's light-heavyweight division (– 81 kg) by USA's eventual bronze medalist Antonio Tarver.
