= José Pérez Reyes =

Dominican Republic boxer (born 1975)

Personal information
- Full name: José Pérez Reyes
- Nationality: Dominican Republic
- Born: June 19, 1975 (age 51)
- Height: 1.65 m (5 ft 5 in)
- Weight: 48 kg (106 lb)

Sport
- Sport: Boxing
- Weight class: Light Flyweight

José Pérez Reyes (born June 19, 1975) is a male boxer from the Dominican Republic, who competed for his native country at the 1996 Summer Olympics in Atlanta, Georgia. There he was stopped in the second round of the men's light flyweight division by Romania's Sabin Bornei.
