= Yang Xiangzhong =

Chinese boxer (born 1974)

Personal information
- Full name: 楊 相中
- Nationality: China
- Born: September 29, 1974 (age 51) China
- Height: 1.65 m (5 ft 5 in)
- Weight: 48 kg (106 lb)

Sport
- Sport: Boxing
- Weight class: Light Flyweight

Yang Xiangzhong (born September 29, 1974) is a retired male boxer from China.

Xiangzhong competed at the 1996 Summer Olympics in the light flyweight division. He advanced to the second round, where he was beaten by Morocco's Hamid Berhili. Xiangzhong competed again at the 2000 Summer Olympics, where he competed in the flyweight division and was defeated in the first round against Romanian Bogdan Dobrescu.
