= 1996 Summer Olympics medal table =

1996 Summer Olympics medals
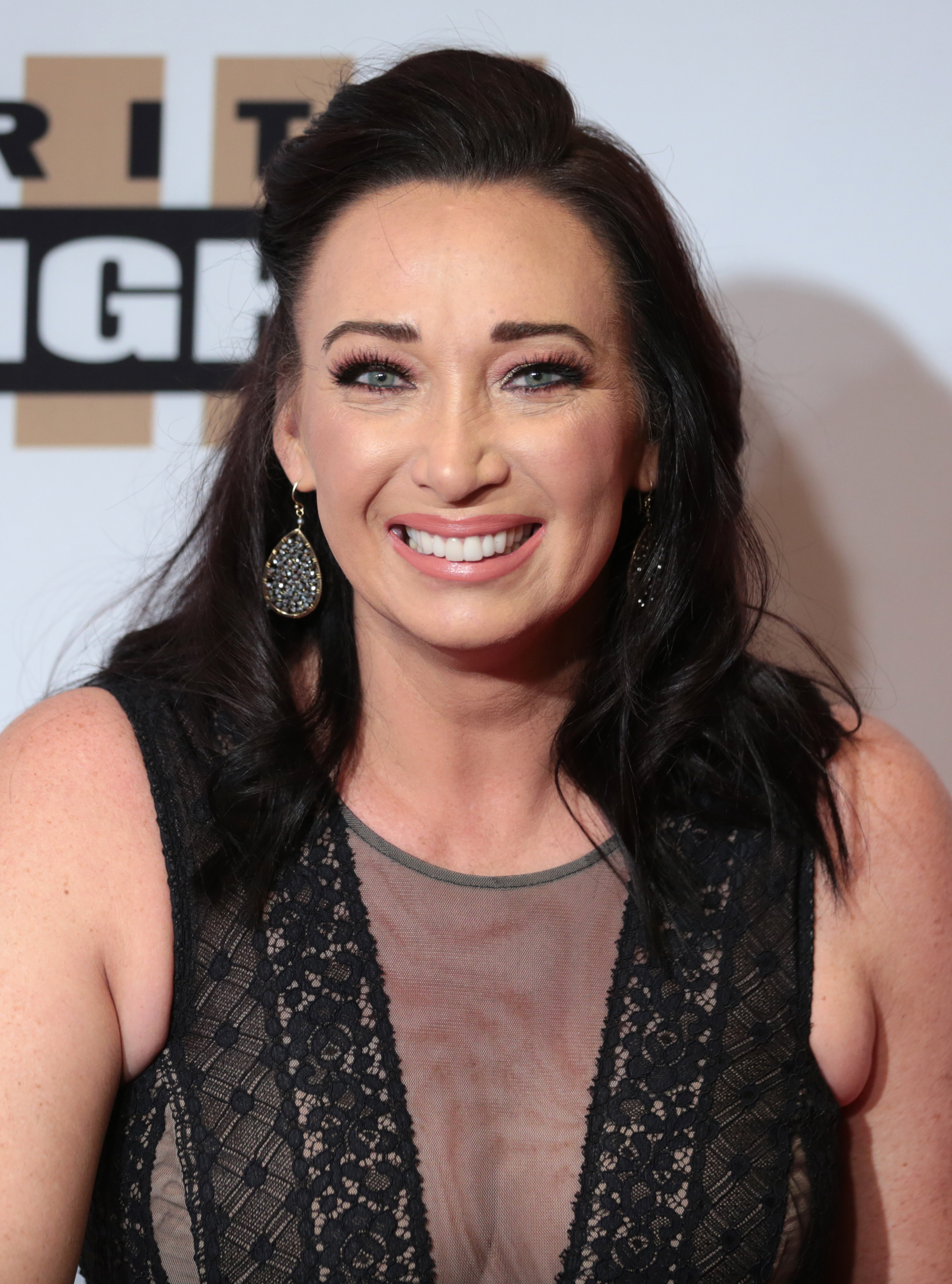
- American swimmer Amy Van Dyken won four gold medals at the 1996 Summer Olympics, the most of any competing athlete.
- Location: Atlanta, United States

Highlights
- Most gold medals: United States (44)
- Most total medals: United States (101)
- Medalling NOCs: 79

World map showing the medal achievements of each country during the 1996 Summer Olympics Legend: represents countries that won at least one gold medal. represents countries that won at least one silver medal but no gold medals. represents countries that won at least one bronze medal (no gold or silver). represents participating countries that did not win medals. represents entities that did not participate at the 1996 Summer Olympics.

The 1996 Summer Olympics, officially known as the Games of the XXVI Olympiad, were an international summer multi-sport event held in Atlanta, Georgia, United States from July 19 to August 4, 1996. A total of 10,318 athletes representing 197 National Olympic Committees (NOCs) participated. The games featured 271 events in 26 sports across 37 disciplines, including the Olympic debuts of beach volleyball, mountain biking and softball. A total of 24 countries made their Summer Olympic debuts in Atlanta, including 11 former Soviet republics participating for the first time as independent nations.

79 nations received at least one medal, with 53 of them winning at least one gold medal, both of which were new records. Armenia, Belarus, Burundi, Costa Rica, Croatia, Czech Republic, Ecuador, Hong Kong, Kazakhstan, Nigeria, Slovakia, Syria, Thailand, and Ukraine won their nations' first Summer Olympic gold medals. They were also the first Summer Olympic medals of any kind for Armenia, Belarus, Burundi, Czech Republic, Ecuador, Hong Kong, Kazakhstan, Slovakia, and Ukraine. Meanwhile, Azerbaijan, Georgia, Moldova, Mozambique, Tonga, and Uzbekistan won their first Summer Olympic medals.

Athletes from the host nation of the United States won the most gold medals, with 44, and the most medals overall, with 101. It marked the first time the United States led the medal count in both gold and overall medals since 1984, and the first at a non-boycotted Olympics since 1968. Among individual participants, American swimmer Amy Van Dyken won the most gold medals with four, while Russian gymnast Alexei Nemov won the most medals overall with six (two gold, one silver, and three bronze).

== Medal table ==
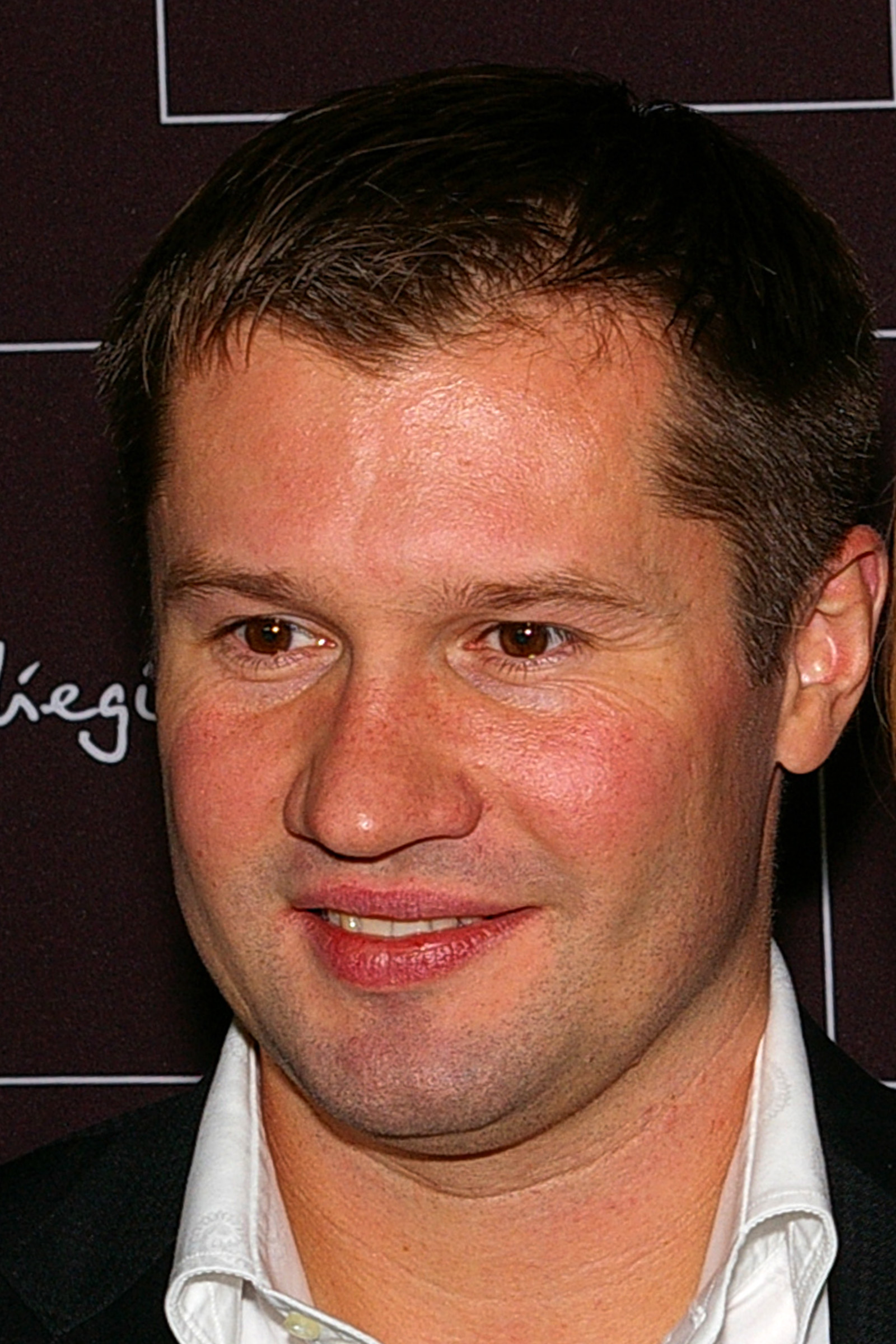
Russian gymnast Alexei Nemov, pictured here in 2009, won six medals at the 1996 games (two gold, one silver, and three bronze medals), the most of any competing athlete.

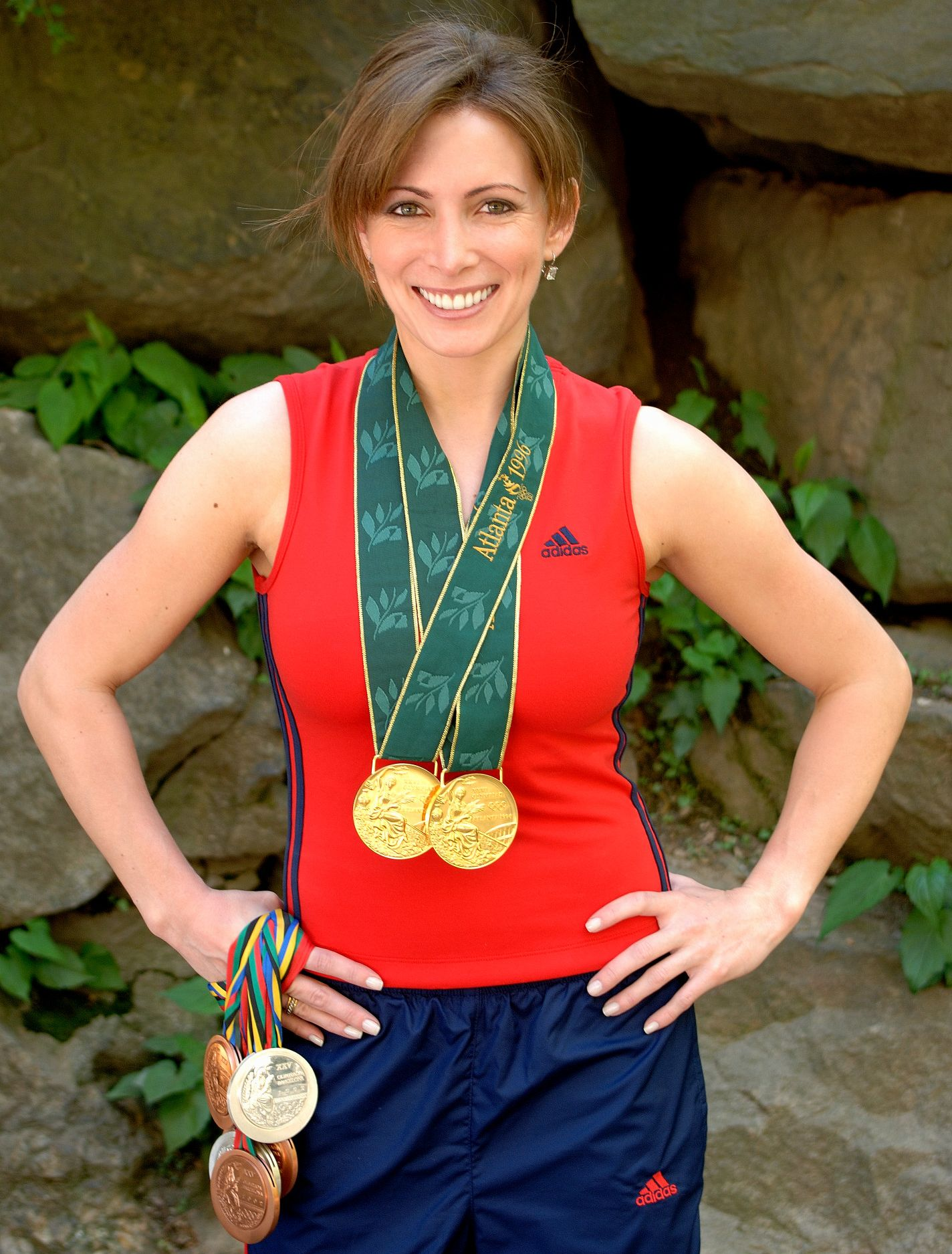
American gymnast Shannon Miller, pictured here in 2013, won gold in the women's artistic team all-round and balance beam at the 1996 games. In addition, she won five medals in gymnastics at the 1992 Summer Olympics.

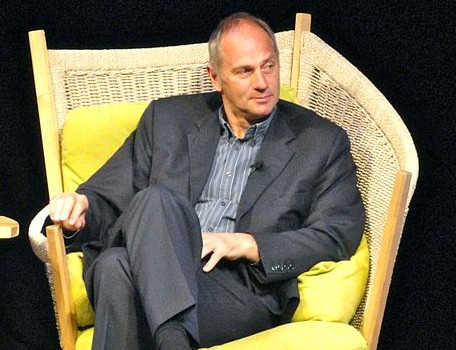
British rower Steve Redgrave, pictured here in 2011, won the men's coxless pair rowing competition, which was his fourth consecutive victory in the event and Great Britain's only gold medal at the 1996 Olympics.

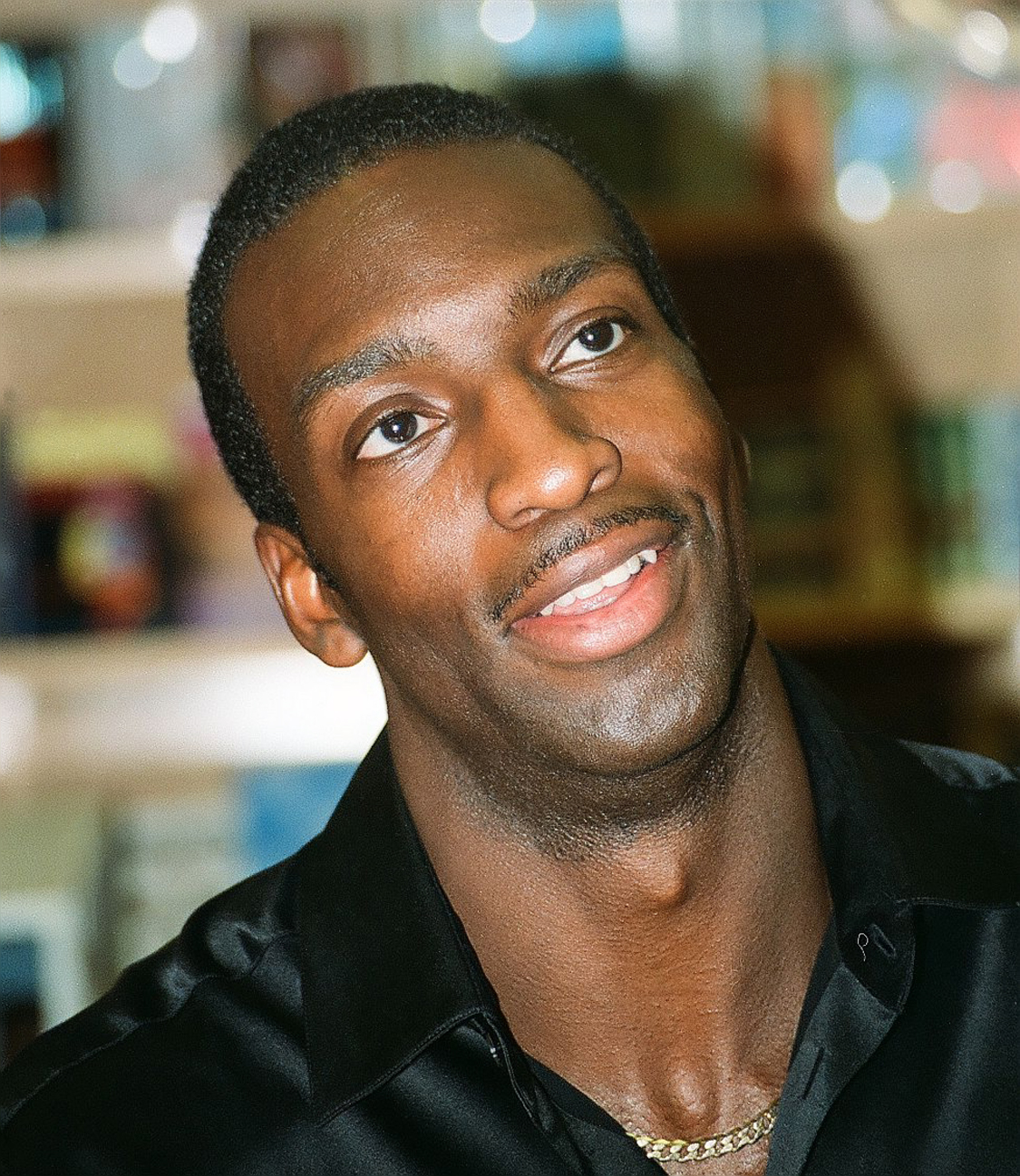
American sprinter Michael Johnson, pictured here in 1995, won two gold medals in the men's 200 metres and 400 metres events.

The medal table is based on information provided by the International Olympic Committee (IOC) and is consistent with IOC conventional sorting in its published medal tables. The table uses the Olympic medal table sorting method. By default, the table is ordered by the number of gold medals the athletes from a nation have won, where a nation is an entity represented by a NOC. The number of silver medals is taken into consideration next and then the number of bronze medals. If teams are still tied, equal ranking is given and they are listed alphabetically by their IOC country code.

Events in boxing resulted in bronze medals being awarded to each of the competitors who lost their semi-final matches, as opposed to them taking part in a third place tiebreaker. Events in judo used a repechage system which also resulted in two bronze medals being awarded.

In the men's rings and women's uneven bars events, there were ties for second place which resulted in two silver medals and no bronze medals being issued in each event. In the women's artistic individual all-around, two bronze medals were awarded due to a tie. Additionally, in the men's horizontal bars, three bronze medals were awarded due to a tie.

* Host nation (United States)

1996 Summer Olympics medal table
Rank	NOC	Gold	Silver	Bronze	Total
1	United States*	44	32	25	101
2	Russia	26	21	16	63
3	Germany	20	18	27	65
4	China	16	22	12	50
5	France	15	7	15	37
6	Italy	13	10	12	35
7	Australia	9	9	23	41
8	Cuba	9	8	8	25
9	Ukraine	9	2	12	23
10	South Korea	7	15	5	27
11	Poland	7	5	5	17
12	Hungary	7	4	10	21
13	Spain	5	6	6	17
14	Romania	4	7	9	20
15	Netherlands	4	5	10	19
16	Greece	4	4	0	8
17	Czech Republic	4	3	4	11
18	Switzerland	4	3	0	7
19	Denmark	4	1	1	6
19	Turkey	4	1	1	6
21	Canada	3	11	8	22
22	Bulgaria	3	7	5	15
23	Japan	3	6	5	14
24	Kazakhstan	3	4	4	11
25	Brazil	3	3	9	15
26	New Zealand	3	2	1	6
27	South Africa	3	1	1	5
28	Ireland	3	0	1	4
29	Sweden	2	4	2	8
30	Norway	2	2	3	7
31	Belgium	2	2	2	6
32	Nigeria	2	1	3	6
33	North Korea	2	1	2	5
34	Algeria	2	0	1	3
34	Ethiopia	2	0	1	3
36	Great Britain	1	8	6	15
37	Belarus	1	6	8	15
38	Kenya	1	4	3	8
39	Jamaica	1	3	2	6
40	Finland	1	2	1	4
41	FR Yugoslavia	1	1	2	4
41	Indonesia	1	1	2	4
43	Iran	1	1	1	3
43	Slovakia	1	1	1	3
45	Armenia	1	1	0	2
45	Croatia	1	1	0	2
47	Portugal	1	0	1	2
47	Thailand	1	0	1	2
49	Burundi	1	0	0	1
49	Costa Rica	1	0	0	1
49	Ecuador	1	0	0	1
49	Hong Kong	1	0	0	1
49	Syria	1	0	0	1
54	Argentina	0	2	1	3
55	Namibia	0	2	0	2
55	Slovenia	0	2	0	2
57	Austria	0	1	2	3
58	Malaysia	0	1	1	2
58	Moldova	0	1	1	2
58	Uzbekistan	0	1	1	2
61	Azerbaijan	0	1	0	1
61	Bahamas	0	1	0	1
61	Chinese Taipei	0	1	0	1
61	Latvia	0	1	0	1
61	Philippines	0	1	0	1
61	Tonga	0	1	0	1
61	Zambia	0	1	0	1
68	Georgia	0	0	2	2
68	Morocco	0	0	2	2
68	Trinidad and Tobago	0	0	2	2
71	India	0	0	1	1
71	Israel	0	0	1	1
71	Lithuania	0	0	1	1
71	Mexico	0	0	1	1
71	Mongolia	0	0	1	1
71	Mozambique	0	0	1	1
71	Puerto Rico	0	0	1	1
71	Tunisia	0	0	1	1
71	Uganda	0	0	1	1
Totals (79 entries)		271	273	298	842

== See also ==
- All-time Olympic Games medal table
- List of 1996 Summer Olympics medal winners
- 1996 Summer Paralympics medal table
