= Takrawlek Dejrath =

- Born: Phaiwan Luangphon (ไพวัลย์ หลวงพล); April 24, 1972 (age 54); Ban Takraw, Dan Khun Thot, Nakhon Ratchasima
- Nickname: Manud hin junior (มนุษย์หินจูเนียร์) "Rock Man Jr."
- Nationality: Thai
- Height: 1.59 m (5 ft 3 in)
- Division: Mini flyweight Junior flyweight
- Style: Muay Thai boxing
- Stance: Orthodox
- Fighting out of: Om Noi, Samut Sakhon
- Team: Dejrath Gym
- Trainer: Surat Sianglor
- Years active: 1980s-1996

Professional boxing record
- Total: 6
- Wins: 5
- By knockout: 2
- Losses: 1
- By knockout: 1
- Draws: 0
- No contests: 0

Other information
- University: Chandrakasem Rajabhat University
- Spouse: Ratchanee Luangphon
- Notable relatives: Chatchainoi Chaoraioi (older brother); Phetchartchai Chaoraioi (nephew); Chainoi Worawut (nephew)
- Boxing record from BoxRec

Takrawlek Dejrath or alternatively spelled Takorlek Dejarat (Thai: ตะคร้อเล็ก เดชรัตน์; born April 24, 1972 –) is a Thai retired Muay Thai fighter and professional boxer from Nakhon Ratchasima, who was professionally active in the 1990s.

== Career ==
Dejrath was born in Ban Takraw, Dan Khun Thot District (currently in Thepharak District), Nakhon Ratchasima Province, northeastern region in Muay Thai fighter family. His father owned a small Muay Thai gym. So he trained in fighting when he was only seven years old and competed in local events for only 50–100 baht. His older brother is also a famous Muay Thai fighter Chatchainoi Chaoraioi.

He traveled to Bangkok for Muay Thai fighting without any hope of becoming a champion, but merely wishing to continue his studies. He has come to live at Surat Sianglor (same trainer as Payao Poontarat)'s Muay Thai gym where the fighters will have the opportunity to study together with fighting.

He started out with regular fights at the Siam Om Noi Stadium, before moving on to major arena Lumpinee and Rajadamnern Stadiums. He fights in the lightest weight class category of 105–108 pounds.

Although Dejrath never won any titles, he was only ranked 105–108 pounds of the Lumpinee and Rajadamnern Stadiums. But he was known as a fighter with fierce fighting style, precise and heavy punches as well as kicks to the opponent's ankle violently (known in Thai cho-yang–เจาะยาง, "tire puncturing"). He has faced many great fighters such as Saenmuangnoi Lukchaopormahesak, Thongchai Tor.Silachai, Jakphet Keatchaiyong, Rittidej Sor.Ploenchit and Payaklek Sor.Ploenchit. Especially in the fight against Payaklek Sor.Ploenchit in November 1991 at the Lumpinee Stadium, he won TKO in the 3rd round with elbow strikes. This bout was regarded as the best fight of the year of the Lumpinee Stadium.

On March 27, 1992, he won by knockout with fist in the first round against Pimaran Sitaran, the older brother of Pimaranlek Sitaran (Somluck Kamsing), the first Thai Olympic gold medalist.

He also changed style to professional boxing in 1991 and 1993, a total of 6 fights, 5 wins (2 on knockouts), 1 lost by knockout. His only defeat came on August 18, 1993, in the event organized by Sombhop Srisomvongse at the Channel 7's studio, by losing in second round knockout to Eric Chávez, a veteran Filipino who held the IBF Mini flyweight world title for a short time between 1989–90.

== Post-retirement ==
Takrawlek Dejrath retired at the age of 24 after graduating with a bachelor's degree in Physical Education from Chandrakasem Rajabhat Institute (now Chandrakasem Rajabhat University). The highest value he got was 80,000 baht.

He came to work at a real estate company in Lat Phrao neighbourhood. He continued to work from the start as an employee until eventually becoming an executive.

Personal life, he is married and has two children. His daughter has been an amateur Muay Thai fighter and won a youth championship.

Currently, Dejrath owned a Muay Thai school in Bangkok include being an assistant coach for the Thai national amateur boxers as well.

And he also has a business selling Kai yang (Thai grilled chicken), which is his own chicken marinade recipe.

== Titles and accomplishments ==
- Rajadamnern Stadium
  - 1994 Rajadamnern Stadium Fight of the Year

== Muay Thai record ==
Muay Thai record
Date	Result	Opponent	Event	Location	Method	Round	Time
1996-05-12	Draw	(Thailand) Banchadej Kiatmuangtrang	Rajadamnern Stadium	Bangkok, Thailand	Decision	5	3:00
1994-12-22	Win	(Thailand) Kaopong Pinsinchai	Lumpinee Stadium	Bangkok, Thailand	KO (Punches)	1	
1994-04-14	Win	(Thailand) Kongpatapee Majestic	Lumpinee Stadium	Bangkok, Thailand	Decision	5	3:00
1994-02-08	Loss	(Thailand) Jakrapet Kiatchaiyong	Lumpinee Stadium	Bangkok, Thailand	TKO (Punches)	5	
1992-10-13	Win	(Thailand) Rattanachai Woraphon	Lumpinee Stadium	Bangkok, Thailand	Decision	5	3:00
1992-07-31	Win	(Thailand) Dokmaifai Tor.Sitthichai	Lumpinee Stadium	Bangkok, Thailand	KO (Punches)	1	
1992-04-17	Win	(Thailand) Sakchai Wongwianyai	Lumpinee Stadium	Bangkok, Thailand	Decision	5	3:00
1992-03-27	Win	(Thailand) Pimaran Sitaran	Lumpinee Stadium	Bangkok, Thailand	KO (Punches)	1	
1992-02-25	Win	(Thailand) Payaklek Sor.Ploenchit	Lumpinee Stadium	Bangkok, Thailand	KO (Punches)	2	
1991-11-12	Win	(Thailand) Payaklek Sor.Ploenchit	Lumpinee Stadium	Bangkok, Thailand	KO (Elbow)	3	
1991-07-19	Loss	(Thailand) Pongsak Lukbanyai	Lumpinee Stadium	Bangkok, Thailand	Decision	5	3:00
1991-06-11	Loss	(Thailand) Singdam Or.Ukrit	Lumpinee Stadium	Bangkok, Thailand	Decision	5	3:00
1991-02-14	Win	(Thailand) Chainoi Sitchunthong	Lumpinee Stadium	Bangkok, Thailand	TKO (Doctor stoppage)	3	
1990-12-30	Win	(Thailand) Surin Wittayasasubsawat	Channel 7 Stadium	Bangkok, Thailand	Decision	5	3:00
1990-10-02		(Thailand) Surin Wittayasasubsawat	Lumpinee Stadium	Bangkok, Thailand			
1990-06-22	Loss	(Thailand) Samson Isan	Lumpinee Stadium	Bangkok, Thailand	Decision	5	3:00
1990-05-17	Win	(Thailand) Panthong Na Pattaya	Rajadamnern Stadium	Bangkok, Thailand	Decision	5	3:00
1990-	Loss	(Thailand) Thongchai Tor.Silachai	Lumpinee Stadium	Bangkok, Thailand	Decision	5	3:00
1990-03-21	Win	(Thailand) Rittidet Sor.Ploenchit	Lumpinee Stadium	Bangkok, Thailand	KO (Punches)	3	
1990-	Loss	(Thailand) Thongchai Tor.Silachai	Lumpinee Stadium	Bangkok, Thailand	Decision	5	3:00
1988-06-07	Loss	(Thailand) Tukatathong Por.Pongsawang	Lumpinee Stadium	Bangkok, Thailand	Decision	5	3:00
1988-01-01	Loss	(Thailand) Denthoranee Ekamon	Lumpinee Stadium	Bangkok, Thailand	Decision	5	3:00
Legend: Win Loss Draw/No contest Notes
