= Radoslav Suslekov =

Bulgarian boxer

Medal record

Representing Bulgaria

Men's Boxing

World Amateur Championships
Bronze medal – third place	1995 Berlin	Light Welterweight

European Amateur Championships
Bronze medal – third place	1996 Vejle	Light Welterweight

Radoslav Suslekov (Bulgarian: Радослав Суслеков, born 13 July 1974) is a boxer from Bulgaria.

He was born in Burgas. At the 1996 Summer Olympics he was stopped in the first round of the Light welterweight (63.5 kg) division by Iran's Babak Moghimi. Suslekov had won bronze medals in the same division earlier, at the 1995 World Amateur Boxing Championships and the 1996 European Amateur Boxing Championships.
