= Athletics at the 1998 Asian Games – Men's 110 metres hurdles =

Men's 110 metres hurdles at the 1998 Asian Games
- Venue: Thammasat Stadium
- Dates: 18–19 December 1998
- Competitors: 11 from 8 nations

Medalists
gold medal	Chen Yanhao	China
silver medal	Andrey Sklyarenko	Kazakhstan
bronze medal	Hamad Mubarak Al-Dosari	Qatar

The men's 110 metres hurdles competition at the 1998 Asian Games in Bangkok, Thailand was held on 18–19 December at the Thammasat Stadium.

== Schedule ==
All times are Indochina Time (UTC+07:00)

Date	Time	Event
Friday, 18 December 1998	14:30	Heats
Saturday, 19 December 1998	15:00	Final

== Results ==
Legend

- DNF — Did not finish

=== Heats ===
- Qualification: First 3 in each heat (Q) and the next 2 fastest (q) advance to the final.

==== Heat 1 ====
- Wind: −1.3 m/s

Rank	Athlete	Time	Notes
1	Andrey Sklyarenko (KAZ)	13.91	Q
2	Chen Yanhao (CHN)	13.91	Q
3	Hamad Mubarak Al-Dosari (QAT)	14.07	Q
4	Bader Abbas (KUW)	14.42	q
5	Songpol Sangmark (THA)	14.54	

==== Heat 2 ====
- Wind: −0.3 m/s

Rank	Athlete	Time	Notes
1	Satoru Tanigawa (JPN)	13.90	Q
2	Qi Zhen (CHN)	14.22	Q
3	Mahesh Perera (SRI)	14.24	Q
4	Mubarak Khasif (QAT)	14.39	q
5	Supan Wongsripeuk (THA)	14.65	
6	Tang Hon Sing (HKG)	14.96	

=== Final ===
- Wind: −0.1 m/s

Rank	Athlete	Time	Notes
1st place, gold medalist(s)	Chen Yanhao (CHN)	13.65	
2nd place, silver medalist(s)	Andrey Sklyarenko (KAZ)	13.86	
3rd place, bronze medalist(s)	Hamad Mubarak Al-Dosari (QAT)	13.99	
4	Mubarak Khasif (QAT)	14.27	
5	Satoru Tanigawa (JPN)	14.37	
6	Bader Abbas (KUW)	14.38	
7	Qi Zhen (CHN)	14.71	
—	Mahesh Perera (SRI)	DNF	
