= Stefan Ström =

Swedish boxer

Personal information
- Full name: Jim Stefan Ström
- Nationality: Sweden
- Born: December 13, 1977 (age 48) Gävle, Gävleborg
- Height: 1.70 m (5 ft 7 in)
- Weight: 48 kg (106 lb)

Sport
- Sport: Boxing
- Weight class: Light Flyweight
- Club: Boxningsklubben Falken, Gävle

Stefan Ström (born 13 December 1977 in Gävle, Gävleborg) is a retired male boxer from Sweden, who competed for his native country at the 1996 Summer Olympics in Atlanta, Georgia. There he was stopped in the first round of the men's light flyweight division (– 48 kg) by Cuba's title contender Yosvani Aguilera.
