= Tarajing Potpot =

- Genre: Comedy
- Written by: Roel Naval
- Directed by: Willy Cuevas
- Starring: Ian Veneracion; Paolo Contis; Mansueto Velasco
- Country of origin: Philippines
- Original language: Filipino
- No. of episodes: 65

Production
- Executive producer: Nini Patricia S. Colladia

Original release
- Network: ABS-CBN
- Release: March 6, 1999 – June 10, 2000

Tarajing Potpot is a Philippine action/adventure comedy that aired on ABS-CBN from March 6, 1999 to June 10, 2000.

== Plot ==
It revolves around four siblings - Andres, Goryo, Pepe and Diego. They grew up separately but are brought together on the occasion of their father's death. The father's lawyer, Atty. Contrapuno, gathers them together to hand over their inheritance. Problem was, their father, Señor Facundo turns out to be a treasure hunter. He hid the treasures he found and leave them the map. He also gives them his "house", a dilapidated bus that he turned into a mobile home. The four siblings use the bus as their new home and transportation to find the treasure. They are joined by Snooky, Andres' admirer. Señor Facundo's two greedy assistants - Aga and Goma - also keep on following them since they want part of the treasure Señor Facundo refuses to share.

== Cast ==
- Ian Veneracion as Andres
- Paolo Contis as Pepe
- Mansueto Velasco as Goryo
- Bentong as Diego
- Nikki Valdez
- Chris Aguilar
- Rommel Velasco
- Edgar Mortiz

== See also ==
- List of programs aired by ABS-CBN
