= Bernard Inom =

French boxer (born 1973)

Medal record

Representing France

Men's Boxing

World Amateur Championships
Silver medal – second place	Berlin 1995	Light Flyweight

Bernard Inom (born August 25, 1973) is a retired boxer from France, who competed in the light flyweight division during the 1990s. He won the silver medal at the 1995 World Amateur Boxing Championships in Berlin, where he was defeated in the final by Bulgaria's Daniel Petrov.

== Biography ==
Bernard Inom won a silver medal at the 1995 World Championships in Berlin in the Light flyweight division.

At the national level, he was the French amateur boxing champion in the light flyweight division in 1992, 1993, and 1994, and in the flyweight division in 1997, 1998, and 1999.
