= Jesús Martínez (boxer) =

Mexican boxer (born 1976)

Jesús Martínez Tejeda
Personal information
- Nickname: Changa
- Nationality: Mexican
- Born: Jesús Martínez Tejeda; 19 January 1976 (age 50) Gómez Palacio, Durango
- Height: 1.63 m (5 ft 4 in)
- Weight: Light Flyweight

Boxing career
- Stance: Orthodox

Boxing record
- Total fights: 25
- Wins: 18
- Win by KO: 11
- Losses: 7

Jesús Martínez Tejeda (born 19 January 1976 in Gómez Palacio, Durango) is a Mexican former professional boxer who competed from 1997 to 2011. He challenged for the WBC flyweight title in 2002. As an amateur, he represented his country at the 1996 Summer Olympics in Atlanta, Georgia. In that competition, he lost in the second round of the men's light flyweight division to Indonesia's La Paene Masara.
