= Andrey Sklyarenko =

Kazakhstani hurdler (born 1976)

Medal record

Men's athletics

Representing Kazakhstan

Asian Championships
Bronze medal – third place	1998 Fukuoka	110 m hurdles

Andrey Sklyarenko (born 10 January 1976) is a retired Kazakhstani hurdler who specialized in the 110 metres hurdles.

As a junior he won the silver medal at the 1994 Asian Junior Championships and competed at the 1994 World Junior Championships without reaching the final. Sklyarenko won the 1995, 1997 and 1999 Central Asian Games, won the bronze medal at the 1998 Asian Championships and the silver medal at the 1998 Asian Games. He competed at the 1997 and 2001 World Championships without reaching the final.

His personal best time was 13.78 seconds, achieved in June 1998 in Istanbul. He had 7.87 seconds in the 60 metres hurdles, achieved in February 1999 in Moscow.
