= Albert Guardado =

American boxer

Personal information
- Full name: Albert Guardado, Jr.
- Nationality: United States
- Born: July 11, 1973 (age 52) Redlands, California
- Height: 1.67 m (5 ft 6 in)
- Weight: 48 kg (106 lb)

Sport
- Sport: Boxing
- Weight class: Light Flyweight
Medal record
World Amateur Championships
Bronze medal – third place	1993 Tampere	Light Flyweight
Pan American Games
Bronze medal – third place	1995 Mar del Plata	Light Flyweight
Goodwill Games
Bronze medal – third place	1994 Saint Petersburg	Light Flyweight

Albert Guardado Jr. (born July 11, 1973) is a retired boxer from the United States, who competed at the 1996 Summer Olympics in Atlanta, Georgia. There he was defeated in the quarterfinals of the light flyweight division (– 48 kg) by Ukraine's eventual bronze medalist Oleg Kiryukhin.

Guardado was trained by his father, Albert Guardado Sr. and grew up in Topeka, Kansas. After retiring from boxing, Guardado Jr. moved to Lenexa, Kansas where he lives with his wife and three children.

== 1996 Olympic results ==
- Defeated Healer Modiradilo (Botswana) 11–9
- Defeated Anicet Rasoanaivo (Madagascar) 9–4
- Lost to Oleg Kiryukhin (Ukraine) 14–19

== Notable results ==
- 1993 – Bronze Medal at the World Championships in Tampere, Finland
- 1995 – Bronze Medal at the Pan American Games in Mar del Plata, Argentina
