= George Earnshaw (sport shooter) =

Filipino sports shooter

Personal information
- Citizenship: Filipino
- Born: 30 November 1953 (age 72)

Sport
- Country: Philippines
- Sport: Shooting
- Event(s): Trap, double trap
Medal record
Men's Shooting
Representing Philippines
Asian Games
| Bronze medal – third place | 1974 Tehran | Trap |
Southeast Asian Games
| Gold medal – first place | 1995 Chiang Mai | Double trap |
| Gold medal – first place | 1995 Chiang Mai | Trap |

George Earnshaw is a Filipino sports shooter who competed at the 1996 Summer Olympics in Atlanta.

He qualified for the 1996 Summer Olympics via a wildcard ticket. Earnshaw has also competed at the Southeast Asian Games, winning at least a gold medal in double trap in the 1995 edition.

== Olympic results ==
| Event | 1984 |
|---|---|
| Trap (mixed) | 56th 113 |
| Double trap (men) | 27th 125 |
