= Onyok Velasco =

Filipino boxer

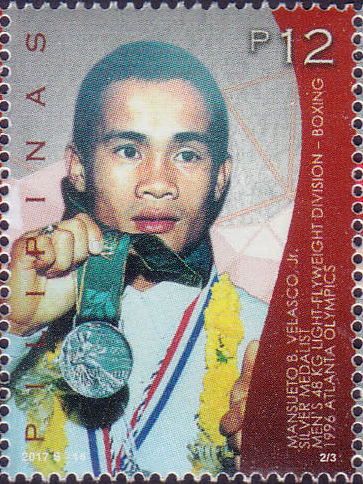
- Velasco on 2017 stamp

Personal information
- Full name: Mansueto Velasco Jr.
- Nickname: Onyok
- Born: January 10, 1974 (age 52) Bago, Negros Occidental, Philippines
- Height: 1.57 m (5 ft 2 in)
- Weight: 48 kg (106 lb)

Sport
- Sport: Boxing
- Weight class: Light flyweight
Medal record
Men's amateur boxing
Representing the Philippines
Olympic Games
Silver medal – second place	1996 Atlanta	Light flyweight (-48 kg)
Asian Games
Gold medal – first place	1994 Hiroshima	Light flyweight (-48 kg)
Asian Amateur Boxing Championships
Silver medal – second place	1995 Tashkent	Light Flyweight

Mansueto "Onyok" Velasco Jr. (born January 10, 1974) is a Filipino retired boxer, comedian and actor from Bago, Negros Occidental. Competing in the 48 kg category he won a gold medal at the 1994 Asian Games and a silver at the 1996 Summer Olympics, the Philippines' only medal at those Games. He is the younger brother of Roel Velasco, a light-flyweight boxer who won a bronze medal at the 1992 Summer Olympics in Barcelona.

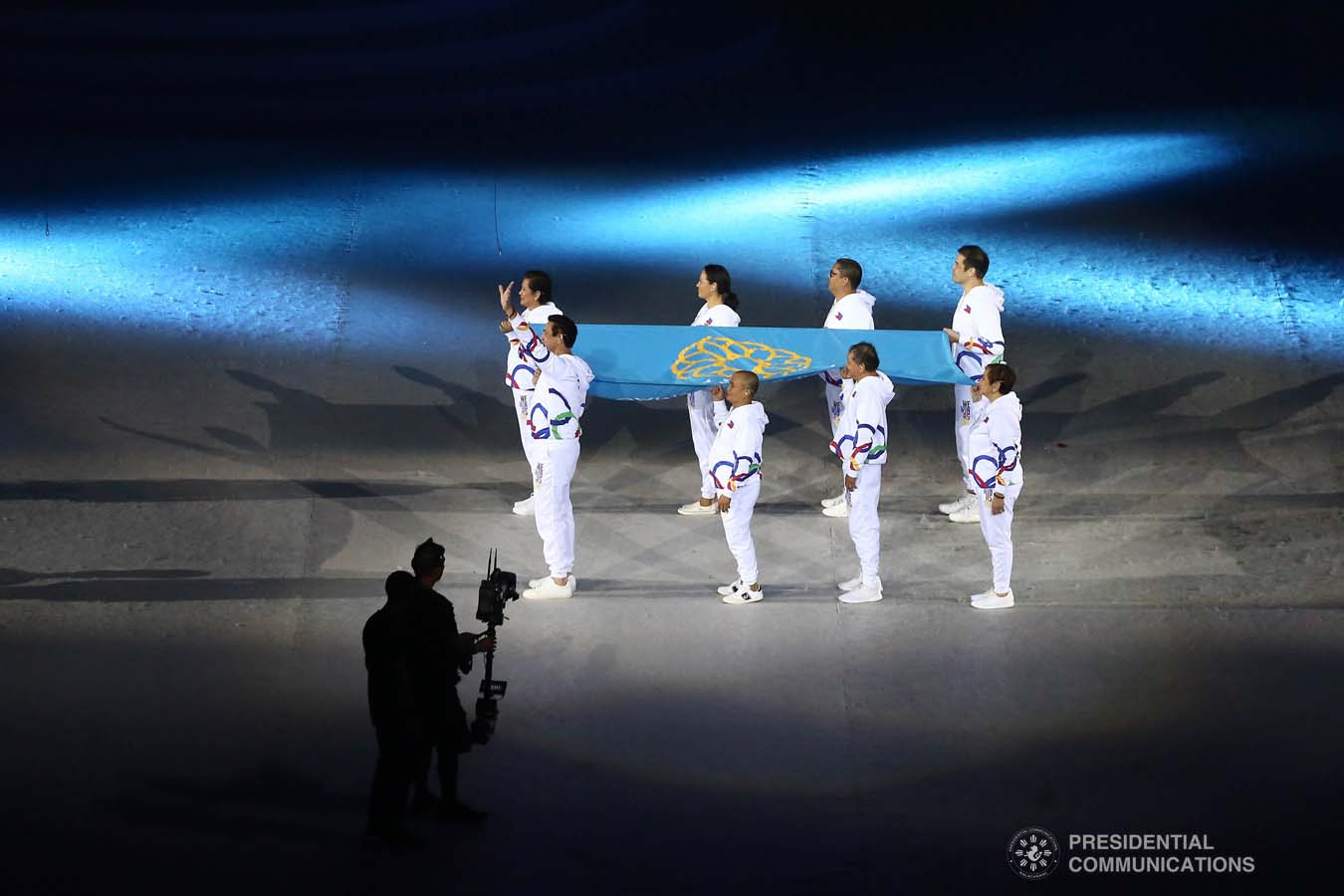
Velasco(bottom second) together with other athletes, carry the Southeast Asian (SEA) Games Federation flag during the opening ceremony of the 30th SEA Games at the Philippine Arena in Bocaue, Bulacan on 2019.

== Olympic results ==
1996 Summer Olympics results

- Defeated Chih-Hsiu Tsai (Taiwan) RSC 1 (2:27)
- Defeated Yosvani Aguilera (Cuba) PTS 14–5
- Defeated Hamid Berhili (Morocco) PTS 20–10
- Defeated Rafael Lozano (Spain) PTS 22–10
- Lost to Daniel Petrov (Bulgaria) PTS 6–19 (claim silver medal)

== Acting career ==
Velasco retired from boxing due to lack of government support and pursued an acting career, stating that he found it more financially sustainable. His life and boxing career was featured in the 1997 film The Onyok Velasco Story, where he played himself. This marked his first venture into acting.

Velasco later had a successful career as a comedian, appearing in several sitcoms and comedy films, including Show Me Da Manny on GMA 7. He also played the role of a boxing trainer on the TV5 comedy-drama Beki Boxer.

== Unfulfilled incentives ==
For his feat in the 1996 Summer Olympics, he received pledges of monetary and non-monetary incentives. He was able to receive ₱1 million from then-Manila Mayor Mel Lopez and ₱500,000 from the Philippine Sports Commission. However, not all of these pledges materialized as of 2021 including a ₱2.5 million pledge by the House of Representatives in 1996 and the title for the house and lot he received.

== Filmography ==
=== Television ===
- Tarajing Pot Pot
- GMA Supershow - guest
- ASAP Natin 'To
- Magandang Tanghali Bayan
- Tropang Trumpo – guest
- Maalaala Mo Kaya
- Richard Loves Lucy
- Ispup
- Da Body En Da Guard
- Da Pilya En Da Pilot
- Idol Ko si Kap
- OK Fine, Whatever
- OK Fine, Oh Yes!
- OK Fine, 'To Ang Gusto Nyo!
- Kool Ka Lang
- Magpakailanman
- Kamao: Matira't Matibay – co-host
- Extra Challenge
- Sabi Ni Nanay
- Kemis: Kay Misis Umasa
- Maynila
- Baywalk
- Talentadong Pinoy – judge
- It's Showtime – celebrity judge
- Everybody Hapi
- Pinoy Records Presents: Pinoy Extreme Talent – judge
- Show Me Da Manny
- Ang Pinaka
- Totoo TV – guest
- Magic Palayok
- Manny Many Prizes
- Toda Max
- Pepito Manaloto – guest
- Beki Boxer – Ninong Onyok
- Celebrity Bluff
- Wasak
- Tunay na Buhay
- Matanglawin – guest
- Aha! – guest
- Demolition Job
- Don't Lose the Money – guest
- Basta Every Day Happy – guest
- Astig
- Ismol Family – guest
- Sabado Badoo
- Mac and Chiz
- Sunday PinaSaya
- Till I Met You - guest
- My Super D - guest
- Langit Lupa - guest
- Dear Uge
- FPJ's Ang Probinsyano - guest
- Home Sweetie Home - guest
- La Luna Sangre - guest
- Alyas Robin Hood - guest
- Wansapanataym Presents: Amazing Ving - guest
- Cain at Abel - guest
- Victor Magtanggol
- Precious Hearts Presents: Los Bastardos
- The General's Daughter - guest
- Magandang Buhay - guest
- Mars Pa More - guest
- First Yaya - guest
- John en Ellen - guest
- Huwag Kang Mangamba - guest
- Niña Niño - guest
