= Joseph Benhard =

Namibian boxer (born 1972)

Personal information
- Nickname: Fimbi Kaliwa
- Nationality: Namibian
- Born: Joseph Benhard; 10 May 1972 (age 54) Okalongo, Namibia
- Height: 173 cm (5 ft 8 in)
- Weight: Flyweight

Boxing career

Boxing record
- Total fights: 2
- Wins: 0
- Win by KO: 0
- Losses: 2
- Draws: 0
- No contests: 0

Joseph Benhard (born 10 May 1972) is a Namibian boxer. Bernhard competed for Namibia at the 1996 Summer Olympics. Fighting as a light flyweight, Benhard lost to Spaniard Rafael Lozano in the first round. He also represented Namibia at the 1994 Commonwealth Games.

Benhard turned professional in 2004 but lost the light weight challenge in 2005 to Simon Negodhi. He then tried to make a comeback but his age wouldn’t allow it. Nicknamed "Fimbi Kaliwa", he is still undefeated in his amateur boxing career. He founded the Kilimanjaro Boxing club in March 2007.

== Professional boxing record ==
| 2 fights | 0 wins | 2 losses |
|---|---|---|
| By knockout | 0 | 2 |
| By decision | 0 | 0 |
| Draws | 0 | |
| No contests | 0 | |

| No. | Result | Record | Opponent | Type | Round, time | Date | Location | Notes |
|---|---|---|---|---|---|---|---|---|
| 2 | Loss | 0–2 | (Namibia) Simon Negodhi | TKO | 2 (4) | Nov 11, 2006 | Ongwediva Trade Fair Centre, Ongwediva, Namibia | |
| 1 | Loss | 0–1 | (Namibia) Simon Negodhi | TKO | 4 (4) | Oct 3, 2005 | Ongwediva Trade Fair Centre, Ongwediva, Namibia | Pro debut for Benhard |
