= Abdul Rashid Qambrani =

Pakistani boxer (born 1975)

Personal information
- Full name: Abdul Rashid Qambrani
- Nationality: Pakistan
- Born: July 12, 1975 (age 50) Lahore, Pakistan
- Height: 1.68 m (5 ft 6 in)
- Weight: 48 kg (106 lb)

Sport
- Sport: Boxing
- Weight class: Light Flyweight

Abdul Rashid Qambrani (born 1975) is a retired male boxer from Pakistan, who competed for his native country at the 1996 Summer Olympics in Atlanta, Georgia. There he was stopped in the first round of the men's light flyweight division (– 48 kg) by Ukraine's eventual bronze medalist Oleg Kiryukhin.
