= Debendra Thapa =

Nepalese-Indian boxer

Personal information
- Nickname: The Nepal Tiger
- Nationality: Nepalese; Indian
- Born: 26 June 1977 (age 49) Syangja, Nepal
- Height: 11.61 m (38 ft 1 in)
- Weight: Super flyweight; Bantamweight; Super bantamweight

Boxing career
- Stance: Southpaw

Boxing record
- Total fights: 28
- Wins: 20
- Win by KO: 11
- Losses: 6
- Draws: 1
- No contests: 1
Medal record
Men's amateur boxing
Representing India
South Asian Games
| Gold medal – first place | 1995 Madras | Light flyweight |

Debendra Thapa (born 26 June 1977), also called Debind Thapa, is a Nepalese-Indian former professional boxer who competed from 1998 to 2006. He challenged twice for the WBC-NABF super flyweight title in 2001 and the WBC-NABF super bantamweight title in 2003. As an amateur, he competed for India in the men's light flyweight event at the 1996 Summer Olympics. He also won a gold medal at the 1995 South Asian Games.

== Professional boxing record ==
| 28 fights | 20 wins | 6 losses |
|---|---|---|
| By knockout | 11 | 3 |
| By decision | 9 | 3 |
| Draws | 1 | |
| No contests | 1 | |

| No. | Result | Record | Opponent | Type | Round, time | Date | Location | Notes |
|---|---|---|---|---|---|---|---|---|
| 28 | Loss | 20–6–1 (1) | (United States) Jason Litzau | KO | 2 (10), 3:00 | 11 May 2006 | (United States) Schuetzen Park, North Bergen, New Jersey, U.S. | |
| 27 | Loss | 20–5–1 (1) | (United States) Gary Stark Jr | RTD | 5 (8) | 9 Mar 2006 | (United States) Manhattan Center Grand Ballroom, New York City, New York, U.S. | |
| 26 | Loss | 20–4–1 (1) | (Canada) Steve Molitor | TKO | 8 (10), 3:00 | 19 Aug 2005 | (United States) Hanover Marriott, Whippany, New Jersey, U.S. | |
| 25 | Win | 20–3–1 (1) | (Mexico) Juan Carlos Jacobo | TD | 6 (8), 2:40 | 2 Apr 2005 | (United States) Clarion Hotel, Atlantic City, New Jersey, U.S. | |
| 24 | Draw | 19–3–1 (1) | (Mexico) Juan Carlos Jacobo | PTS | 8 | 10 Sep 2004 | (United States) Tropicana Hotel & Casino, Atlantic City, New Jersey, U.S. | |
| 23 | Win | 19–3 (1) | (Mexico) Margarito Lopez | TKO | 5 (6), 1:20 | 23 Jan 2004 | (United States) Tropicana Hotel & Casino, Atlantic City, New Jersey, U.S. | |
| 22 | Loss | 18–3 (1) | (Guatemala) David Donis | UD | 12 | 7 Jul 2003 | (United States) Pontchartrain Center, Kenner, Louisiana, U.S. | For WBC–NABF super bantamweight title |
| 21 | Win | 18–2 (1) | (Colombia) Francisco Tejedor | UD | 8 | 18 Mar 2003 | (United States) Boardwalk Hall, Atlantic City, New Jersey, U.S. | |
| 20 | Loss | 17–2 (1) | (United States) Phillip Payne | SD | 6 | 22 Jun 2002 | (United States) Sovereign Center, Reading, Pennsylvania, U.S. | |
| 19 | Win | 17–1 (1) | (Puerto Rico) Omar Adorno | TD | 9 (10), 0:07 | 18 Jan 2002 | (United States) Sports Arena, Raleigh, North Carolina, U.S. | |
| 18 | Win | 16–1 (1) | (Colombia) Isidro Tejedor | TKO | 6 (6), 2:09 | 22 Jun 2001 | (United States) Zembo Shrine, Harrisburg, Pennsylvania, U.S. | |
| 17 | Win | 15–1 (1) | (United States) Michael Cribbin | UD | 4 | 8 Apr 2001 | (United States) River Edge, Reading, Pennsylvania, U.S. | |
| 16 | Loss | 14–1 (1) | (Mexico) Oscar Andrade | UD | 12 | 21 Feb 2001 | (United States) Tropicana Hotel & Casino, Atlantic City, New Jersey, U.S. | For vacant WBC–NABF super flyweight title |
| 15 | Win | 14–0 (1) | (Colombia) Julio Coronel | TKO | 5 (6), 1:51 | 22 Sep 2000 | (United States) The Blue Horizon, Philadelphia, Pennsylvania, U.S. | |
| 14 | Win | 13–0 (1) | (United States) Dan Davis | KO | 5 (?), 1:58 | 11 Aug 2000 | (United States) Tropicana Hotel & Casino, Atlantic City, New Jersey, U.S. | |
| 13 | Win | 12–0 (1) | (Puerto Rico) Cesar Cortes | TKO | 2 (6) | 9 Jun 2000 | (United States) Zembo Shrine, Harrisburg, Pennsylvania, U.S. | |
| 12 | Win | 11–0 (1) | (Tanzania) Rogers Mtagwa | UD | 8 | 2 May 2000 | (United States) Big O Center, Philadelphia, Pennsylvania, U.S. | |
| 11 | NC | 10–0 (1) | (United States) Dan Davis | NC | 2 (6) | 24 Mar 2000 | (United States) The Blue Horizon, Philadelphia, Pennsylvania, U.S. | NC due to an accidental headbutt |
| 10 | Win | 10–0 | (United States) Glenn Ghany | TKO | 2 (6) | 18 Feb 2000 | (United States) Ballys Park Place Hotel Casino, Atlantic City, New Jersey, U.S. | |
| 9 | Win | 9–0 | (Russia) Ravil Mukhamadiyarov | UD | 8 | 29 Jan 2000 | (United States) Ballys Park Place Hotel Casino, Atlantic City, New Jersey, U.S. | |
| 8 | Win | 8–0 | (Puerto Rico) Melquiades Ventura | KO | 1 (6) | 29 Oct 1999 | (United States) The Blue Horizon, Philadelphia, Pennsylvania, U.S. | |
| 7 | Win | 7–0 | (United States) Coy Gibson | KO | 1 (4) | 25 September 1999 | (United States) Zembo Shrine, Harrisburg, Pennsylvania, U.S. | |
| 6 | Win | 6–0 | (United States) Lionel Odom | TKO | 4 (6) | 18 June 1999 | (United States) Zembo Shrine, Harrisburg, Pennsylvania, U.S. | |
| 5 | Win | 5–0 | (United States) Mike Thomas | UD | 6 | 13 May 1999 | (United States) Michael's Eighth Avenue, Glen Burnie, Maryland, U.S. | |
| 4 | Win | 4–0 | (United States) Daniel Diaz | TKO | 1 (?) | 17 Apr 1999 | (United States) Tropicana Hotel & Casino, Atlantic City, New Jersey, U.S. | |
| 3 | Win | 3–0 | (United States) Pedro Santos | PTS | 4 | 29 Jan 1999 | (United States) Tropicana Hotel & Casino, Atlantic City, New Jersey, U.S. | |
| 2 | Win | 2–0 | (United States) Terney Clark | KO | 1 (4) | 15 Dec 1998 | (United States) Trenton, New Jersey, U.S. | |
| 1 | Win | 1–0 | (United States) Jerry Smith | UD | 4 | 7 Nov 1998 | (United States) Recreation Center, Pleasantville, New Jersey, U.S. | |
