= Healer Modiradilo =

Botswana boxer (born 1970)

Personal information
- Full name: Healer Modiradilo
- Nationality: Botswana
- Born: July 19, 1970 (age 55)
- Weight: 48 kg (106 lb)

Sport
- Sport: Boxing
- Weight class: Light Flyweight

Healer Modiradilo (born 1970-07-19) is a retired male boxer from Botswana, who competed for his native country at the 1996 Summer Olympics in Atlanta, Georgia. There he was stopped in the first round of the men's light flyweight division (– 48 kg) by American boxer Albert Guardado. He also represented Botswana at the 1994 Commonwealth Games, losing his opening bout to Victor Kasote of Zambia.
