= Alfred Tetteh =

Ghanaian boxer

Personal information
- Full name: Alfred Tetteh
- Nickname: The Stinging Bee
- Nationality: Ghana
- Born: August 1, 1975 (age 50) Accra, Ghana
- Height: 1.60 m (5 ft 3 in)
- Weight: 55.5 kg (122 lb)

Sport
- Sport: Boxing
- Weight class: Super Bantamweight

Alfred Tetteh (born 1 August 1975) is a Ghanaian former professional boxer who competed from 2000 to 2015. At super bantamweight he challenged for the Commonwealth (British Empire) belt in 2003 and won the WBO Africa title in 2011. As an amateur he represented his country at the 1996 Summer Olympics in Atlanta, Georgia. There he was stopped in the first round of the men's light flyweight division (– 48 kg) by Morocco's Hamid Berhili.

== Professional career ==
Tetteh turned professional in 2000 and won the National Super Bantamweight title in 2003 in his eleventh pro fight. He followed that up with an unsuccessful bid for the Commonwealth title in England that same year. In 2007, he lifted the West African Boxing Union Featherweight championship, but plagued by managerial problems, was inactive for the next three years having only two contests.

At the close of 2010, once again winning the national title, this time the vacant Featherweight belt, fortune smiled on Tetteh when local football and business magnate, Nana Adjei Ampofo, signed him to his fledgling Union Promotions with the intent to steer Tetteh to a world championship.

Tetteh quickly claimed the vacant WBO Africa Super Bantamweight title in 2011 and defended it the same year. The two victories catapulted him into the top ten of World Boxing Organization's rankings making him eligible for a shot at the WBO world title.
