= Masibulele Makepula =

South African boxer (born 1973)

Masibulele Makepula (born 3 March 1973) in East London, South Africa) is a professional boxer and later became charismatic pastor.

== Amateur Achievements ==
- Represented South Africa at the 1994 Commonwealth Games in Victoria.
- Gold Medalist at the 1995 All-Africa Games in Harare as a Light Flyweight.
- Represented South Africa at the 1996 Olympics in Atlanta, Georgia as a Light Flyweight. His results were:
- Defeated Debind Thapa (India) TKO 1
- Lost to Rafael Lozano (Spain) points

== Professional career ==
Nicknamed "Hawk", Makepula turned pro in 1996 and captured the vacant WBO light flyweight title with a decision win over Jacob Matlala in 2000. He vacated the title and moved up in weight after the win. In 2006 he lost an eliminator to Jorge Arce by TKO.

== See also ==
- List of light-flyweight boxing champions

Olympic Games
Preceded by Dino Quattrocecere	Flagbearer for South Africa; Atlanta 1996	Succeeded by Shirene Human
Sporting positions
Major world boxing titles
Vacant Title last held by Michael Carbajal	WBO light flyweight champion February 19, 2000 – 2000; Stripped	Vacant Title next held by Nelson Dieppa
Minor world boxing titles
Vacant Title last held by Damaen Kelly	IBO flyweight champion January 26, 2002 – September 14, 2002; Vacated	Succeeded by Mzukisi Sikali
