= Reynaldo Galido =

Filipino boxer (born 1975)

Personal information
- Nationality: Filipino
- Born: May 1, 1975 (age 50)
- Height: 5 ft 6 in (168 cm)
- Weight: 141 lb (64 kg)

Boxing career

Reynaldo L. Galido (born May 1, 1975) is a retired Filipino boxer. He won a gold medal in boxing at the 1994 Asian Games. Galido competed in the men's light welterweight event at the 1996 Summer Olympics.

Galido is part of the coaching staff of the 2024 Philippine boxing team.
