= Dimo Tonev =

Bulgarian volleyball player (born 1964)

Personal information
- Nationality: Bulgarian
- Born: 2 July 1964 (age 62)
- Height: 205 cm (6 ft 9 in)
- Weight: 92 kg (203 lb)

Career
Years	Teams
1994	(Greece) Olympiacos Piraeus

National team
Bulgaria

Dimo Tonev (Bulgarian: Димо Тонев; born 2 July 1964) is a former Bulgarian male volleyball player. He was part of the Bulgaria men's national volleyball team at the 1988 Summer Olympics, 1994 FIVB Volleyball Men's World Championship and 1996 Summer Olympics. During the opening ceremony of the 1996 Summer Olympics he was the flag bearer for Bulgaria. He played for Olympiacos in Greece.

== Clubs ==
- (Greece) Olympiacos (1994)
