= Sabin Bornei =

Romanian boxer (born 1975)

Personal information
- Full name: Sabin Marius Bornei
- Nationality: Romania
- Born: January 5, 1975 (age 51) Bucharest
- Height: 1.61 m (5 ft 3 in)
- Weight: 48 kg (106 lb)

Sport
- Sport: Boxing
- Weight class: Light Flyweight
Medal record
European Amateur Championships
Bronze medal – third place	1996 Vejle	Light Flyweight

Sabin Marius Bornei (born January 5, 1975) is a retired amateur boxer from Romania, who won a bronze medal in the light flyweight division (– 48 kg) at the 1996 European Amateur Boxing Championships in Vejle, Denmark. Born in Bucharest, he represented his native country in the juniorflyweight class at the 1996 Summer Olympics in Atlanta, Georgia, where he was eliminated in the second round by Thailand's Somrot Kamsing.
