= Worasit Vechaphut =

Thai sprinter (born 1976)

Personal information
- Nationality: Thai
- Born: 13 November 1976 (age 49)

Sport
- Sport: Sprinting
- Event: 4 × 100 metres relay
Medal record
Men's athletics
Representing Thailand
Asian Championships
Silver medal – second place	1995 Jakarta	4×100 m

Worasit Vechaphut (born 13 November 1976) is a Thai sprinter. He competed in the men's 4 × 100 metres relay at the 1996 Summer Olympics.
