= La Paene Masara =

Indonesian boxer

Personal information
- Full name: La Paene Masara
- Nationality: Indonesia
- Born: November 10, 1973 (age 52) Baubau, Southeast Sulawesi, Indonesia
- Height: 1.60 m (5 ft 3 in)
- Weight: 48 kg (106 lb)

Sport
- Sport: Boxing
- Weight class: Light Flyweight

La Paene Masara (born 1973-11-10) is a retired male boxer from Indonesia, who twice competed for his native Asian country at the Summer Olympics: 1996 and 2000. At his Olympic debut in Atlanta, Georgia, he was defeated in the quarterfinals of the men's light flyweight division (– 48 kg) by Spain's eventual bronze medalist Rafael Lozano.
