= Yosvani Aguilera =

Cuban boxer (born 1975)

Personal information
- Full name: Yosvani Aguilera Zamora
- Nationality: Cuba
- Born: January 6, 1975 (age 51) Granma
- Height: 1.63 m (5 ft 4 in)
- Weight: 54 kg (119 lb)

Sport
- Sport: Boxing
- Weight class: Bantamweight
Medal record
Pan American Games
Bronze medal – third place	2003 Santo Domingo	Featherweight

Yosvany Aguilera Zamora (born January 6, 1975, in Granma) is a boxer from Cuba.

He participated in the 1996 Summer Olympics for his native Caribbean country. There he was stopped in the second round of the light-flyweight (– 48 kg) division by Philippines' eventual runner-up Mansueto Velasco. Aguilera also competed at the 2000 Summer Olympics.

Aguilera won the bronze medal in the featherweight (– 57 kg) division at the Pan American Games in Santo Domingo.
