= Sayan Namwong =

Thai sprinter (born 1975)

Personal information
- Nationality: Thai
- Born: 6 March 1975 (age 51)

Sport
- Sport: Sprinting
- Event: 4 × 100 metres relay

Sayan Namwong (born 6 March 1975) is a Thai sprinter. He competed in the men's 4 × 100 metres relay at the 1996 Summer Olympics.
