= Yaşar Giritli =

Turkish boxer

Personal information
- Full name: Yaşar Giritli
- Nationality: Turkish
- Born: 1 August 1969 (age 56)
- Height: 1.55 m (5 ft 1 in)
- Weight: 48 kg (106 lb)

Sport
- Sport: Boxing
- Weight class: Light Flyweight

Yaşar Giritli (born 1 August 1969) is a retired male boxer from Turkey. He competed for his native country at the 1996 Summer Olympics in Atlanta, Georgia. There, Thailand's Somrot Kamsing stopped him in the first round of the men's light flyweight division.
