= 1996 European Amateur Boxing Championships =

Boxing competitions

- Host city: Vejle
- Country: Denmark
- Nations: 35
- Athletes: 304
- Dates: 30 March–7 April

The Men's 1996 European Amateur Boxing Championships were held in Vejle, Denmark from March 30 to April 7. The 31st edition of the bi-annual competition, in which 304 fighters from 35 countries participated this time, was organised by the European governing body for amateur boxing, EABA.

== Medal winners ==
Event	Gold	Silver	Bronze
Light Flyweight (– 48 kilograms)	Daniel Petrov; Bulgaria	Oleg Kiryukhin; Ukraine	Sabin Bornei; Romania Rafael Lozano; Spain
Flyweight (– 51 kilograms)	Albert Pakeyev; Russia	Yuliyan Strogov; Bulgaria	(Republic of Ireland) Damaen Kelly; Ireland Serhiy Kovganko; Ukraine
Bantamweight (– 54 kilograms)	István Kovács; Hungary	Raimkul Malakhbekov; Russia	Aleksandar Khristov; Bulgaria John Larbi; Sweden
Featherweight (– 57 kilograms)	Ramaz Paliani; Russia	Serafim Todorov; Bulgaria	Scott Harrison; Scotland David Burke; England
Lightweight (– 60 kilograms)	Leonard Doroftei; Romania	Tontcho Tontchev; Bulgaria	Vahdettin İşsever; Turkey Christian Giantomassi; Italy
Light Welterweight (– 63.5 kilograms)	Oktay Urkal; Germany	Nurhan Süleymanoğlu; Turkey	Radoslav Suslekov; Bulgaria Sergey Bykovsky; Belarus
Welterweight (– 67 kilograms)	Hasan Al; Denmark	Marian Simion; Romania	Sergiy Dzindziruk; Ukraine Oleg Saitov; Russia
Light Middleweight (– 71 kilograms)	Francisc Vaştag; Romania	Markus Beyer; Germany	Pavol Polakovič; Czech Republic György Mizsei; Hungary
Middleweight (– 75 kilograms)	Sven Ottke; Germany	Zsolt Erdei; Hungary	Jean-Paul Mendy; France Aleksandr Lebziak; Russia
Light Heavyweight (– 81 kilograms)	Pietro Aurino; Italy	Jean-Louis Mandengue; France	Dmitry Vybornov; Russia Yusuf Öztürk; Turkey
Heavyweight (– 91 kilograms)	Luan Krasniqi; Germany	Christophe Mendy; France	Wojciech Bartnik; Poland Kwamena Turkson; Sweden
Super Heavyweight (+ 91 kilograms)	Alexei Lezin; Russia	Wladimir Klitschko; Ukraine	René Monse; Germany Attila Levin; Sweden

== Medal table ==
Rank	Nation	Gold	Silver	Bronze	Total
1	Russia (RUS)	3	1	3	7
2	Germany (GER)	3	1	1	5
3	Romania (ROM)	2	1	1	4
4	Bulgaria (BUL)	1	3	2	6
5	Hungary (HUN)	1	1	1	3
6	Italy (ITA)	1	0	1	2
7	Denmark (DEN)	1	0	0	1
8	Ukraine (UKR)	0	2	2	4
9	France (FRA)	0	2	1	3
10	Turkey (TUR)	0	1	2	3
11	Sweden (SWE)	0	0	3	3
12	Belarus (BLR)	0	0	1	1
12	Czech Republic (CZE)	0	0	1	1
12	England (ENG)	0	0	1	1
12	Ireland (IRL)	0	0	1	1
12	Poland (POL)	0	0	1	1
12	Scotland (SCO)	0	0	1	1
12	Spain (ESP)	0	0	1	1
Totals (18 entries)		12	12	24	48
