= Tsai Chih-hsiu =

Taiwanese boxer

Personal information
- Nationality: Taiwanese
- Born: 25 October 1976 (age 48)

Sport
- Sport: Boxing

Tsai Chih-hsiu (born 25 October 1976) is a Taiwanese boxer. He competed in the men's light flyweight event at the 1996 Summer Olympics.
