= Goat (2015 film) =

2015 film

- Theatrical release poster
- Directed by: Ivan Ostrochovský
- Written by: Ivan Ostrochovský; Marek Lescák
- Starring: Peter Baláž
- Cinematography: Martin Kollár
- Music by: Miroslav Toth
- Production companies: Ceská Televize; Endorfilm; Punkchart films Rozhlas a televízia Slovenska; Sentimentalfilm
- Release dates: 8 February 2015 (Berlin); 10 September 2015 (Slovakia)
- Running time: 75 minutes
- Countries: Slovakia; Czech Republic
- Languages: Slovak; Czech; German; English

Goat (Slovak: Koza) is a 2015 Slovak-Czech drama film directed by Ivan Ostrochovský who co-wrote with Marek Lescák. It was screened in the Contemporary World Cinema section of the 2015 Toronto International Film Festival. The film was selected as the Slovak entry for the Best Foreign Language Film at the 88th Academy Awards but it was not nominated.

== Cast ==
- Peter Baláž as himself
- Nikola Bongilajová as Nikolka
- Stanislava Bongilajová as Misa
- Ján Franek as Franek
- Alexandra Palatinusová as Mia (voice)
- Tatiana Piussi as Hitchhiker
- Manfred Schmid as The German

== See also ==
- List of submissions to the 88th Academy Awards for Best Foreign Language Film
- List of Slovak submissions for the Academy Award for Best Foreign Language Film
