= Mohamed Mesbahi =

Moroccan boxer (born 1969)

Personal information
- Nationality: Moroccan
- Born: 29 April 1969 (age 56); Casablanca, Morocco

Sport
- Sport: Boxing

Mohamed Mesbahi (born 29 April 1969) is a Moroccan boxer. He competed at the 1992 Summer Olympics, 1996 Summer Olympics and the 2000 Summer Olympics.
