= Oleh Kyryukhin =

Ukrainian boxer (born 1975)

Oleh Kiryukhin
Personal information
- Full name: Олег Кірюхін
- Nationality: Ukraine
- Born: February 25, 1975 (age 51) Zhdanov, Donetsk Oblast, Ukrainian SSR, Soviet Union
- Height: 1.61 m (5 ft 3 in)
- Weight: 48 kg (106 lb)

Sport
- Sport: Boxing
- Weight class: Light Flyweight
Medal record
Olympic Games
Bronze medal – third place	1996 Atlanta	Light Flyweight
European Championships
Silver medal – second place	1996 Vejle	Light Flyweight
Bronze medal – third place	1998 Minsk	Light Flyweight

Oleh Stanislavovych Kiryukhin (Ukrainian: Кирюхін Олег Станіславович; born January 1, 1975, in Zhdanov) is a Ukrainian boxer, who won the light flyweight bronze medal at the 1996 Summer Olympics.

== Olympic results ==
- Defeated Abdul Rashid Qambrani (Pakistan) 17–3
- Defeated Beibis Mendoza (Colombia) 18–6
- Defeated Albert Guardado (United States) 19–14
- Lost to Daniel Petrov (Bulgaria) 8–17

== Pro career ==
Kiryukin began his professional career in 2000 and had limited success, retiring in 2001 with a record of 5–1–0.
