= Boxing at the 1996 Summer Olympics =

Boxing at the Games of the XXVI Olympiad
- Venue: Alexander Memorial Coliseum
- Dates: 20 July-4 August 1996
- Competitors: 355 from 97 nations

Boxing at the 1996 Summer Olympics took place in the Alexander Memorial Coliseum in Atlanta. The boxing schedule began on 20 July and ended on 4 August. Twelve boxing events were contested, with the participation of 355 athletes from 97 countries.

There was significant controversy surrounding the judging of the fight between Floyd Mayweather of the U.S. and Serafim Todorov of Bulgaria, with Todorov being awarded the semi-final bout win which according to many observers, was won by Mayweather. Additionally, in the final of the light flyweight bout between Bulgaria's Daniel Petrov and Mansueto Velasco of the Philippines, Petrov claimed gold as many spectators believed that Velasco should have won the match and questioned the one-sided scoring of the judges.

== Qualification ==
The following tournaments were used as qualification tournaments for boxing at the 1996 Summer Olympics.

Event	Date	Venue
Asian Championships	1 to October 8, 1995	Tashkent, Uzbekistan
European Championships	March 30 to April 7, 1996	Vejle, Denmark
All-Africa Games	13 to September 23, 1995	Harare, Zimbabwe
Africa Qualification Tournament	April/May 1996	Cairo, Egypt
Australia and Oceania Qualification Tournament	October 1995	Nuku'alofa, Tonga
Pan American Games	March 1995	Mar del Plata, Argentina
Central America Qualification Tournament	February 1996	Guaynabo, Puerto Rico
North America Qualification Tournament	April 1996	Halifax, Canada
South American Championships	March 1996	Buenos Aires, Argentina
Asian Qualification Tournament	April 19–20, 1996	Pasay, Philippines

== Medal winners ==
Event	Gold	Silver	Bronze
Light flyweight (– 48 kg)	Daniel Petrov; Bulgaria	Mansueto Velasco; Philippines	Oleg Kiryukhin; Ukraine
Light flyweight (– 48 kg)	Daniel Petrov; Bulgaria	Mansueto Velasco; Philippines	Rafael Lozano; Spain
Flyweight (– 51 kg)	Maikro Romero; Cuba	Bulat Jumadilov; Kazakhstan	Zoltan Lunka; Germany
Flyweight (– 51 kg)	Maikro Romero; Cuba	Bulat Jumadilov; Kazakhstan	Albert Pakeyev; Russia
Bantamweight (– 54 kg)	István Kovács; Hungary	Arnaldo Mesa; Cuba	Vichairachanon Khadpo; Thailand
Bantamweight (– 54 kg)	István Kovács; Hungary	Arnaldo Mesa; Cuba	Raimkul Malakhbekov; Russia
Featherweight (– 57 kg)	Somluck Kamsing; Thailand	Serafim Todorov; Bulgaria	Pablo Chacón; Argentina
Featherweight (– 57 kg)	Somluck Kamsing; Thailand	Serafim Todorov; Bulgaria	Floyd Mayweather Jr. United States
Lightweight (– 60 kg)	Hocine Soltani; Algeria	Tontcho Tontchev; Bulgaria	Terrance Cauthen; United States
Lightweight (– 60 kg)	Hocine Soltani; Algeria	Tontcho Tontchev; Bulgaria	Leonard Doroftei; Romania
Light welterweight (– 63.5 kg)	Héctor Vinent; Cuba	Oktay Urkal; Germany	Fathi Missaoui; Tunisia
Light welterweight (– 63.5 kg)	Héctor Vinent; Cuba	Oktay Urkal; Germany	Bolat Niyazymbetov; Kazakhstan
Welterweight (– 67 kg)	Oleg Saitov; Russia	Juan Hernández Sierra; Cuba	Daniel Santos; Puerto Rico
Welterweight (– 67 kg)	Oleg Saitov; Russia	Juan Hernández Sierra; Cuba	Marian Simion; Romania
Light middleweight (– 71 kg)	David Reid; United States	Alfredo Duvergel; Cuba	Yermakhan Ibraimov; Kazakhstan
Light middleweight (– 71 kg)	David Reid; United States	Alfredo Duvergel; Cuba	Karim Tulaganov; Uzbekistan
Middleweight (– 75 kg'	Ariel Hernández; Cuba	Malik Beyleroğlu; Turkey	Rhoshii Wells; United States
Middleweight (– 75 kg'	Ariel Hernández; Cuba	Malik Beyleroğlu; Turkey	Mohamed Bahari; Algeria
Light heavyweight (– 81 kg)	Vasilii Jirov; Kazakhstan	Lee Seung-Bae; South Korea	Antonio Tarver; United States
Light heavyweight (– 81 kg)	Vasilii Jirov; Kazakhstan	Lee Seung-Bae; South Korea	Thomas Ulrich; Germany
Heavyweight (– 91 kg)'	Félix Savón; Cuba	David Defiagbon; Canada	Nate Jones; United States
Heavyweight (– 91 kg)'	Félix Savón; Cuba	David Defiagbon; Canada	Luan Krasniqi; Germany
Super heavyweight (+ 91 kg)	Wladimir Klitschko; Ukraine	Paea Wolfgram; Tonga	Duncan Dokiwari; Nigeria
Super heavyweight (+ 91 kg)	Wladimir Klitschko; Ukraine	Paea Wolfgram; Tonga	Alexei Lezin; Russia

== Medal table ==
* Host nation (United States)

Rank	Nation	Gold	Silver	Bronze	Total
1	Cuba	4	3	0	7
2	Bulgaria	1	2	0	3
3	Kazakhstan	1	1	2	4
4	United States*	1	0	5	6
5	Russia	1	0	3	4
6	Algeria	1	0	1	2
6	Thailand	1	0	1	2
6	Ukraine	1	0	1	2
9	Hungary	1	0	0	1
10	Germany	0	1	3	4
11	Canada	0	1	0	1
11	Philippines	0	1	0	1
11	South Korea	0	1	0	1
11	Tonga	0	1	0	1
11	Turkey	0	1	0	1
16	Romania	0	0	2	2
17	Argentina	0	0	1	1
17	Nigeria	0	0	1	1
17	Puerto Rico	0	0	1	1
17	Spain	0	0	1	1
17	Tunisia	0	0	1	1
17	Uzbekistan	0	0	1	1
Totals (22 entries)		12	12	24	48
