= Daniel Petrov =

Bulgarian boxer

Personal information
- Full name: Даниел Божинов Петров
- Nationality: Bulgarian
- Born: 8 September 1971 (age 54) Varna, Bulgaria
- Height: 1.68 m (5 ft 6 in)
- Weight: 48 kg (106 lb)

Sport
- Sport: Boxing
- Weight class: Light Flyweight
- Club: Slavia Club
Medal record
Olympic Games
Gold medal – first place	1996 Atlanta	Light Flyweight
Silver medal – second place	1992 Barcelona	Light Flyweight
World Amateur Championships
Gold medal – first place	1995 Berlin	Light Flyweight
Silver medal – second place	1993 Tampere	Light Flyweight
Bronze medal – third place	1991 Sydney	Light Flyweight
Bronze medal – third place	1997 Budapest	Light Flyweight
European Amateur Championships
Gold medal – first place	1993 Bursa	Light Flyweight
Gold medal – first place	1996 Vejle	Light Flyweight
Bronze medal – third place	1991 Gothenburg	Flyweight

Daniel Bozhilov Petrov (Bulgarian: Даниел Божилов Петров) (born 8 September 1971 in Varna) is a Bulgarian former boxer. He won a silver medal at the Barcelona Olympics in 1992 and a gold medal at the Atlanta Olympics in 1996 in the Light Flyweight category.

Petrov began his career in Varna, Bulgaria, but then went to Slavia (Sofia). He became a national champion several times. In 1993 he captured the European title in Bursa, Turkey. Two years later, he won the world title at the 1995 World Amateur Boxing Championships in Berlin, Germany, followed by the European title a year later in Vejle, Denmark.

== Olympic results ==
1992

- Defeated Nelson Dieppa (Puerto Rico) 10–7
- Defeated O Song-chol (North Korea) RSC 3 (1:09)
- Defeated Pál Lakatos (Hungary) 17–8
- Defeated Jan Quast (Germany) 15–9
- Lost to Rogelio Marcelo (Cuba) 10–20

1996

- 1st round bye
- Defeated Nshan Munchyan (Armenia) 11–5
- Defeated Somrot Kamsing (Thailand) 18–6
- Defeated Oleg Kiryukhin (Ukraine) 17–8
- Defeated Mansueto Velasco (Philippines) 19–6
