= Somrot Kamsing =

Thai boxer

Personal information
- Full name: Somrot Kamsing
- Nicknames: "Rot" "Bus"
- Nationality: Thailand
- Born: September 24, 1971 (age 54) Mueang Khon Kaen District, Khon Kaen Province, Thailand
- Height: 1.55 m (5 ft 1 in)
- Weight: 48 kg (106 lb)

Sport
- Sport: Boxing
- Weight class: Light Flyweight
- Club: Royal Thai Navy
Medal record
Southeast Asian Games
Gold medal – first place	1995 SEA Games	Light Flyweight

Somrot Kamsing (Thai: สมรถ คำสิงห์, RTGS: Somrot Khamsing; born 24 September 1971), professionally known as Pimaran Sitharan (Thai: พิมพ์อรัญ ศิษย์อรัญ, RTGS: Phim-aran Sit-aran) is a retired boxer from Thailand, who competed at the 1996 Summer Olympics. An older brother of Somluck Kamsing, he was defeated in Atlanta, Georgia in the quarterfinals of the men's light flyweight division (– 48 kg) by Bulgaria's eventual gold medalist Daniel Petrov.

== Muay Thai record ==
Muay Thai record
Date	Result	Opponent	Event	Location	Method	Round	Time
1992-03-27	Loss	(Thailand) Takrawlek Dejrath	Lumpinee Stadium	Bangkok, Thailand	KO (Punches)	1	
Legend: Win Loss Draw/No contest Notes
