= Hamid Berhili =

Moroccan boxer (born 1964)

Personal information
- Full name: Hamid Berhili
- Nationality: Morocco
- Born: May 14, 1964 (age 62)
- Weight: 51 kg (112 lb)

Sport
- Sport: Boxing
- Weight class: Flyweight
Medal record
World Amateur Championships
| Bronze medal – third place | 1995 Berlin | Light Flyweight |

Hamid Berhili (born May 14, 1964) is a retired male boxer from Morocco, who twice competed for his North African country at the Summer Olympics: 1992 and 1996. He is best known for winning the bronze medal in the men's light flyweight division (– 48 kg) at the 1995 World Amateur Championships in Berlin, Germany.

== 1992 Olympic record ==
Below is the Olympic record of Hamid Berhili, a flyweight boxer from Morocco, who competed at the 1992 Barcelona Olympics:

- Round of 32: lost to Jesper Jensen (Denmark) on points, 10-4
