= Boxing at the 1994 Commonwealth Games =

Boxing competitions

- Venue: Archie Browning Sports Centre, Esquimalt
- Location: Victoria, Canada
- Dates: 18 to 28 August 1994

Boxing at the 1994 Commonwealth Games was the 15th appearance of the Boxing at the Commonwealth Games. The events were held in Victoria, Canada, from 18 to 28 August 1994 and featured contests in twelve weight classes.

The boxing events were held the Archie Browning Sports Centre in Esquimalt.

Canada topped the boxing medal table by virtue of winning four gold medals.

== Medal table ==
* Host nation (Canada)

Rank	Nation	Gold	Silver	Bronze	Total
1	Canada*	4	1	2	7
2	Kenya	2	2	2	6
3	Northern Ireland	2	2	0	4
4	Nigeria	1	2	0	3
5	England	1	1	2	4
6	Scotland	1	1	1	3
7	Australia	1	0	2	3
8	Zambia	0	1	1	2
9	Samoa	0	1	0	1
9	Wales	0	1	0	1
11	New Zealand	0	0	2	2
11	Uganda	0	0	2	2
13	Botswana	0	0	1	1
13	Ghana	0	0	1	1
13	India	0	0	1	1
13	Pakistan	0	0	1	1
13	Seychelles	0	0	1	1
13	Tanzania	0	0	1	1
13	Tonga	0	0	1	1
13	Trinidad and Tobago	0	0	1	1
13	Zimbabwe	0	0	1	1
Totals (21 entries)		12	12	23	47

== Medallists ==
Event	Gold	Silver	Bronze
Light Flyweight	Abdurahaman Ramadhani; Kenya	Victor Kasote; Zambia	Sah Birju; India; Domenic Figliomeni; Canada
Flyweight	Paul Shepherd; Scotland	Duncan Karanja; Kenya	Boniface Mukuka; Zambia; Danny Costello; England
Bantamweight	Robert Peden; Australia	Spencer Oliver; England	Fred Mutuweta; Uganda
Featherweight	Casey Patton; Canada	Jason Cook; Wales	Matumla Hassan; Tanzania; James Swan; Australia
Lightweight	Michael Strange; Canada	Martin Renaghan; Northern Ireland	Kalolo Fiaui; New Zealand; Arshad Hussain; Pakistan
Light Welterweight	Peter Richardson; England	Mark Winters; Northern Ireland	Trevor Shailer; New Zealand; Tijani Moro; Ghana
Welterweight	Neil Sinclair; Northern Ireland	Eromosele Albert; Nigeria	Richard Rowles; Australia; Wald Fleming; Canada
Light Middleweight	Jim Webb; Northern Ireland	Bob Gasio; Western Samoa	Joseph Townsley; Scotland; Rival Cadeau; Seychelles
Middleweight	Rowan Donaldson; Canada	Rasmus Ojemaye; Nigeria	Peter Wanyoike; Kenya; Mervyn Penniston-John; Trinidad and Tobago
Light Heavyweight	Dale Brown; Canada	John Wilson; Scotland	France Mabiletsa; Botswana; Peter Odhiambo; Kenya
Heavyweight	Omar Ahmed; Kenya	Steve Gallinger; Canada	Ezwell Ndlovu; Zimbabwe; Charles Kizza; Uganda
Super Heavyweight	Duncan Dokiwari; Nigeria	David Anyim; Kenya	Paea Wolfgramm; Tonga; Danny Williams; England

== Results ==
=== Light-flyweight 48kg ===
Round	Winner	Loser	Score
Preliminary	(Kenya) Haman Ramadhani	(Nigeria) Peter Okolo	12:5
Preliminary	(India) Birju Shah	(Northern Ireland) Colin Moffett	14:5
Preliminary	(South Africa) Masibulele Makepula	(Australia) Aaron Everett	26:10
Preliminary	(Uganda) Adam Kassim	(Scotland) Lee Munro	RSC 2
Quarter-Final	(Canada) Domenic Figliomeni	(Namibia) Joseph Benhard	23:18
Quarter-Final	(Zambia) Victor Kasote	(Botswana) Healer Modiradilo	RSCH 2
Quarter-Final	(Kenya) Haman Ramadhani	(Uganda) Adam Kassim	19:9
Quarter-Final	(India) Birju Shah	(South Africa) Masibulele Makepula	+13:13
Semi-Final	(Zambia) Victor Kasote	(Canada) Domenic Figliomeni	20:15
Semi-Final	(Kenya) Haman Ramadhani	(India) Birju Shah	24:8
Final	(Kenya) Haman Ramadhani	(Zambia) Victor Kasote	15:4

=== Flyweight 51kg ===
Round	Winner	Loser	Score
Preliminary	(Kenya) Duncan Karanja	(Jamaica) Aubyn St Hines	RSC 2
Preliminary	(England) Danny Costello	(Papua New Guinea) Howard Gereo	13:4
Preliminary	(Scotland) Paul Shepherd	(Tanzania) Matumla Mbwama	11:8
Preliminary	(Nigeria) Enenuvwedia Osiobe	(Australia) Hussein Hussein	9:8
Preliminary	(Mauritius) Richard Sunee	(Eswatini) Sibusiso Mkhonta	16:6
Preliminary	(Northern Ireland) Damaen Kelly	(Canada) Chris Scott	16:5
Quarter-Final	(Zambia) Boniface Mukuka	(Sri Lanka) Ilandari Kulatunge	KO 3
Quarter-Final	(Kenya) Duncan Karanja	(Mauritius) Richard Sunee	21:11
Quarter-Final	(Scotland) Paul Shepherd	(Nigeria) Enenuvwedia Osiobe	9:7
Quarter-Final	(England) Danny Costello	(Northern Ireland) Damaen Kelly	23:22
Semi-Final	(Scotland) Paul Shepherd	(England) Danny Costello	16:10
Semi-Final	(Kenya) Duncan Karanja	(Zambia) Boniface Mukuka	26:8
Final	(Scotland) Paul Shepherd	(Kenya) Duncan Karanja	20:9

=== Bantamweight 54kg ===
Round	Winner	Loser	Score
Extra preliminary	(Guyana) Gairy St.Clair	(India) Gurmeet Singh	9:7
Extra preliminary	(Northern Ireland) Tommy Waite	(Canada) Claude Lamber	+9:9
Extra preliminary	(Papua New Guinea) John Sam	(Sri Lanka) Madiyanselage Walisundara	5:4
Extra preliminary	(Nigeria) Oluwole Odutayo	(Bangladesh) Moazzamul Haque	RSC 3
Extra preliminary	(Uganda) Fred Mutuweta	(Malaysia) Balkhis Bin Ahlal	RSC 1
Preliminary	(England) Spencer Oliver	(Solomon Islands) Gabriel Taniveke	RSC 2
Preliminary	(Wales) Richard Vowles	(Zimbabwe) Caston Towo	RSC 2
Preliminary	(Ghana) Godson Sowah	(Samoa) Alifi Duffy	RSC 3
Preliminary	(Kenya) George Owenge	(Mauritius) Steve Naraina	RSC 2
Preliminary	(Zambia) Oscar Chongo	(Scotland) Ronnie McPhee	17:10
Preliminary	(Australia) Robbie Peden	(Guyana) Gairy St.Clair	15:5
Preliminary	(Nigeria) Oluwole Odutayo	(Northern Ireland) Tommy Waite	8:6
Preliminary	(Uganda) Fred Muteweta	(Papua New Guinea) John Sam	RSCH 2
Quarter-Final	(Ghana) Godson Sowah	(Zambia) Oscar Chongo	24:17
Quarter-Final	(Australia) Robbie Peden	(Kenya) George Owenge	23:12
Quarter-Final	(England) Spencer Oliver	(Wales) Richard Vowles	20:3
Quarter-Final	(Uganda) Fred Mutuweta	(Nigeria) Oluwole Odutayo	12:9
Semi-Final	(Australia) Robbie Peden	(Uganda) Fred Mutuweta	17:11
Semi-Final	(England) Spencer Oliver	(Ghana) Godson Sowah	23:12
Final	(Australia) Robbie Peden	(England) Spencer Oliver	20:18

=== Featherweight 57kg ===
Round	Winner	Loser	Score
Preliminary	(Australia) James Swan	(India) Venkatesan Devarajan	7:5
Preliminary	(Canada) Casey Patton	(Lesotho) Liphalo Moeketsi	RSC 3
Preliminary	(Northern Ireland) Adrian Patterson	(Barbados) Victor Kgabung	w/o
Preliminary	(Namibia) Albertus Katiti	(Scotland) Brian Carr	10:8
Preliminary	(Tanzania) Hassan Matumla	(England) Dean Pithie	RSCH 2
Preliminary	(Wales) Jason Cook	(Papua New Guinea) Francis Passingan	15:0
Preliminary	(Nigeria) Daniel Attah	(Zimbabwe) Simon Sankulani	8:1
Quarter-Final	(Australia) James Swan	(Guyana) Hugo Lewis	19:18
Quarter-Final	(Canada) Casey Patton	(Northern Ireland) Adrian Patterson	RSC 2
Quarter-Final	(Tanzania) Hassan Matumla	(Namibia) Albertus Katiti	33:13
Quarter-Final	(Wales) Jason Cook	(Nigeria) Daniel Attah	10:6
Semi-Final	(Canada) Casey Patton	(Australia) James Swan	21:8
Semi-Final	(Wales) Jason Cook	(Tanzania) Hassan Matumla	19:18
Final	(Canada) Casey Patton	(Wales) Jason Cook	22:7

=== Lightweight 60kg ===
Round	Winner	Loser	Score
Extra preliminary	(Australia) Joseph Zabakly	(Scotland) Jamie Coyle	11:2
Extra preliminary	(Canada) Michael Strange	(Ghana) Emmanuel Clottey	29:3
Extra preliminary	(South Africa) Irvin Buhlalu	(Eswatini) Patrick Kekana	15:3
Extra preliminary	(Netherlands Antilles) Marvin Simon	(Guyana) Rondell Franklyn	9:1
Extra preliminary	(New Zealand) Kalolo Fiaui	(Zimbabwe) Linus Murabwa	21:6
Extra preliminary	(Zambia) Davis Mwale	(Kenya) Peter Bulinga	16:14
Extra preliminary	(Tanzania) Haji Ally Matumla	(Botswana) O.Medupi	KO 1
Preliminary	(Pakistan) Arshad Hussain	(Samoa) Niusila Seiuli	22:7
Preliminary	(Wales) Gareth Lawrence	(Jamaica) Brian Carnagie	14:2
Preliminary	(Northern Ireland) Martin Renaghan	(Papua New Guinea) Henry Kungsi	16:5
Preliminary	(Lesotho) Koloba Sehloho	(Malawi) Christopher Unyolo	15:1
Preliminary	(Tanzania) Haji Ally Matumla	(Zambia) Davis Mwale	24:7
Preliminary	(New Zealand) Kalolo Fiaui	(England) Andy Green	RSCH 1
Preliminary	(Australia) Joseph Zabakly	(Netherlands Antilles) Marvin Simon	KO 2
Preliminary	(Canada) Michael Strange	(South Africa) Irvin Buhlalu	8:7
Quarter-Final	(Pakistan) Arshad Hussain	(Lesotho) Koloba Sehloho	20:7
Quarter-Final	(Northern Ireland) Martin Renaghan	(Wales) Gareth Lawrence	22:14
Quarter-Final	(New Zealand) Kalolo Fiaui	(Australia) Joseph Zabakly	14:12
Quarter-Final	(Canada) Michael Strange	(Tanzania) Haji Ally Matumla	11:6
Semi-Final	(Canada) Michael Strange	(New Zealand) Kalolo Fiaui	12:2
Semi-Final	(Northern Ireland) Martin Renaghan	(Pakistan) Arshad Hussain	20:11
Final	(Canada) Michael Strange	(Northern Ireland) Martin Renaghan	18:11

=== Light-welterweight 63.5kg ===
Round	Winner	Loser	Score
Extra Preliminary	(Zambia) Daniel Fulanse	(Sri Lanka) R.K.Sumith Prasanna	22:7
Extra Preliminary	(Wales) Andrew Robinson	(Botswana) Johannes Ditlhabang	11:4
Extra preliminary	(Scotland) Jim Pender	(Uganda) Fred Muwonge	12:7
Extra preliminary	(Ghana) Tijani Moro	(Papua New Guinea) Steven Kevi	RSC 2
Extra preliminary	(Seychelles) Gerry Legras	(Australia) Lee Trautsch	11:6
Extra preliminary	(Jamaica) Dane Bernard	(Malaysia) Ramli Yahya	RSC 2
Preliminary	(Tonga) Francisco Kivalu	(Lesotho) Kheo Motsamai	12:6
Preliminary	(Northern Ireland) Mark Winters	(Namibia) Issy Kamakuju	13:0
Preliminary	(England) Peter Richardson	(Canada) Jamie Pagendam	21:17
Preliminary	(New Zealand) Trevor Shailer	(Malawi) Jailosi Minjale	22:3
Preliminary	(South Africa) Stephanus Carr	(Barbados) Esley Padmore	RSCH 3
Preliminary	(Zambia) Daniel Fulanse	(Wales) Andrew Robinson	5:2
Preliminary	(Scotland) Jim Pender	(Jamaica) Dane Bernard	13:6
Preliminary	(Ghana) Tijani Moro	(Seychelles) Gerry Legras	9:8
Quarter-Final	(New Zealand) Trevor Shailer	(Tonga) Francisco Kivalu	12:3
Quarter-Final	(Northern Ireland) Mark Winters	(South Africa) Stephanus Carr	19:6
Quarter-Final	(England) Peter Richardson	(Zambia) Daniel Fulanse	10:6
Quarter-Final	(Ghana) Tijani Moro	(Scotland) Jim Pender	RSCH 1
Semi-Final	(England) Peter Richardson	(Ghana) Tijani Moro	11:7
Semi-Final	(Northern Ireland) Mark Winters	(New Zealand) Trevor Shailer	11:7
Final	(England) Peter Richardson	(Northern Ireland) Mark Winters	20:17

=== Welterweight 67kg ===
Round	Winner	Loser	Score
Extra preliminary	(Uganda) James Lubwama	(Barbados) Christopher Henry	RSCH 2
Extra preliminary	(Nigeria) Albert Eromsole	(New Zealand) Colin Hunia	11:2
Preliminary	(Canada) Wald Fleming	(Pakistan) Abdul Rashid Baloch	14:4
Preliminary	(Northern Ireland) Neil Sinclair	(Scotland) Alan Wolecki	RSC 2
Preliminary	(Australia) Richard Rowles	(Zambia) John Chibuta	14:11
Preliminary	(Wales) Carl Thomas	(The Gambia) Robert Njie	RSC 3
Preliminary	(Botswana) Thuso Khubamang	(Sierra Leone) Dennis Kandeh	RSC 3
Preliminary	(Ghana) Joshua Clottey	(Guyana) Shawn Garnett	12:5
Preliminary	(England) Paul Burns	(South Africa) Jose Mestre	+10:10
Preliminary	(Nigeria) Eromosele Albert	(Uganda) James Lubwama	14:12
Quarter-Final	(Northern Ireland) Neil Sinclair	(Wales) Carl Thomas	RSC 1
Quarter-Final	(Australia) Richard Rowles	(Botswana) Thuso Khubamang	13:6
Quarter-Final	(Canada) Wald Fleming	(England) Paul Burns	19:14
Quarter-Final	(Nigeria) Eromosele Albert	(Ghana) Joshua Clottey	18:4
Semi-Final	(Northern Ireland) Neil Sinclair	(Australia) Richard Rowles	RSC 2
Semi-Final	(Nigeria) Eromosele Albert	(Canada) Wald Fleming	25:6
Final	(Northern Ireland) Neil Sinclair	(Nigeria) Eromosele Albert	25:16

=== Light-middleweight 71kg ===
Round	Winner	Loser	Score
Preliminary	(Scotland) Joe Townsley	(Cayman Islands) Ernest Barnes	RSCH 2
Preliminary	(Trinidad and Tobago) Kirk Sinnette	(Botswana) Baboloki Mogotsi	11:8
Preliminary	(Nigeria) Kingsley Ikeke	(South Africa) Victor Kunene	6:5
Preliminary	(Samoa) Bob Gasio	(Netherlands Antilles) Fitzroy Humphrey	RSCH 3
Preliminary	(Australia) Sean Connell	(Barbados) Marcus Thomas	6:5
Preliminary	(Ghana) Ashiakwei Aryee Larega	(Solomon Islands) Larry Pauna	RSC 3
Preliminary	(Seychelles) Rival Cadeau	(Canada) Allan Bayne	KO 1
Quarter-Final	(Scotland) Joe Townsley	(Ghana) Ashiakwei Aryee Larega	12:9
Quarter-Final	(Samoa) Bob Gasio	(Trinidad and Tobago) Kirk Sinnette	10:4
Quarter-Final	(Seychelles) Rival Cadeau	(Nigeria) Kingsley Ikeke	10:1
Quarter-Final	(Northern Ireland) Jimmy Webb	(Australia) Sean Connell	14:5
Semi-Final	(Northern Ireland) Jimmy Webb	(Seychelles) Rival Cadeau	w/o
Semi-Final	(Samoa) Bob Gasio	(Scotland) Joe Townsley	12:10
Final	(Northern Ireland) Jimmy Webb	(Samoa) Bob Gasio	10:4

=== Middleweight 75kg ===
Round	Winner	Loser	Score
Preliminary	(South Africa) Floris du Plessis	(Netherlands Antilles) Dexter Simmons	RSCH 3
Preliminary	(Kenya) Peter Wanyoke	(Northern Ireland) Danny Ryan	15:7
Preliminary	(Trinidad and Tobago) John Marvin Penniston	(Australia) Armin Diehl	22:10
Preliminary	(Nigeria) Rasmus Ojemaye	(Samoa) Francis Partsch	12:7
Preliminary	(Botswana) David Nyathi	(New Zealand) Sam Leuji	KO 1
Preliminary	(Jamaica) Delroy Henderson	(Namibia) Sackey Shivute	9:7
Preliminary	(Canada) Rowan Donaldson	(Wales) Grant Briggs	11:5
Quarter-Final	(Nigeria) Rasmus Ojemaye	(Botswana) David Nyathi	9:4
Quarter-Final	(Kenya) Peter Wanyoke	(South Africa) Floris du Plessis	RSCH 2
Quarter-Final	(Trinidad and Tobago) John Marvin Penniston	(Jamaica) Delroy Henderson	RSC 3
Quarter-Final	(Canada) Rowan Donaldson	(Eswatini) Dan Mathunjawa	10:7
Semi-Final	(Canada) Rowan Donaldson	(Trinidad and Tobago) John Marvin Penniston	18:13
Semi-Final	(Nigeria) Rasmus Ojemaye	(Jamaica) Peter Wanyoke	15:3
Final	(Canada) Rowan Donaldson	(Nigeria) Rasmus Ojemaye	26:13

=== Light-heavyweight 81kg ===
Round	Winner	Loser	Score
Preliminary	(Scotland) John Wilson	(Uganda) Juma Aiyro	12:0
Preliminary	(Kenya) Peter Odhiambo Opiyo	(Cayman Islands) George Foster	RSC 2
Preliminary	(England) Kelly Oliver	(Australia) Justann Crawford	11:6
Preliminary	(Botswana) France Mabiletsa	(Tanzania) Paulo Maaselbe	16:5
Preliminary	(Northern Ireland) Stephen Kirk	(Zimbabwe) Daliso Lungu	10:7
Quarter-Final	(Canada) Dale Brown	(Nigeria) George Ibediro	16:8
Quarter-Final	(Kenya) Peter Opiyo	(Guyana) Joel Duncan	RSC 2
Quarter-Final	(Scotland) John Wilson	(England) Kelly Oliver	16:10
Quarter-Final	(Botswana) France Mabiletsa	(Northern Ireland) Stephen Kirk	15:6
Semi-Final	(Canada) Dale Brown	(Kenya) Peter Opiyo	12:7
Semi-Final	(Scotland) John Wilson	(Botswana) France Mabiletsa	13:8
Final	(Canada) Dale Brown	(Scotland) John Wilson	RSC 1

=== Heavyweight 91kg ===
Round	Winner	Loser	Score
Preliminary	(Jamaica) Prince Wilks	(Cayman Islands) John Evans	AB 1
Preliminary	(Nigeria) Friday Ahunanya	(Guyana) Julian Skeete	DQ 3
Preliminary	(Canada) Stephen Gallinger	(Seychelles) Roland Raforme	7:3
Quarter-Final	(Uganda) Charles Kizza	(Tonga) Sione Asipeli	18:11
Quarter-Final	(Kenya) Omar Ahmed	(Northern Ireland) Paul Douglas	20:16
Quarter-Final	(Zimbabwe) Ezwell Ndlovu	(Jamaica) Prince Wilks	RSC 2
Quarter-Final	(Canada) Stephen Gallinger	(Nigeria) Friday Ahunanya	6:5
Semi-Final	(Kenya) Omar Ahmed	(Botswana) Charles Kizza	RSC 3
Semi-Final	(Canada) Stephen Gallinger	(Uganda) Ezwell Ndlovu	RSC 3
Final	(Kenya) Omar Ahmed	(Canada) Stephen Gallinger	23:3

=== Super Heavyweight +91kg ===
Round	Winner	Loser	Score
Quarter-Final	(Kenya) David Anyim	(Guyana) Terrence Poole	RSC 1
Quarter-Final	(Nigeria) Duncan Dokiwari	(Samoa) Emilio Leti	RSC 1
Quarter-Final	(England) Danny Williams	(Canada) Shane Hinton	19:9
Quarter-Final	(Tonga) Paea Wolfgramm	(Solomon Islands) Joseph Saimei	RSC 2
Semi-Final	(Nigeria) Duncan Dokiwari	(England) Danny Williams	24:13
Semi-Final	(Kenya) David Anyim	(Tonga) Paea Wolfgramm	9:5
Final	(Nigeria) Duncan Dokiwari	(Kenya) David Anyim	13:9
