= Jason Cook (boxer) =

Wales boxer

Personal information
- Nicknames: The Power, Cookie
- Nationality: British (Welsh)
- Born: Jason Cook; 27 February 1975 (age 51) Maesteg, Wales
- Height: 5 ft 9 in (175 cm)
- Weight: Lightweight

Boxing career
- Stance: Orthodox

Boxing record
- Total fights: 37
- Wins: 30
- Win by KO: 11
- Losses: 6
- Draws: 1
- No contests: 0
Medal record
Men's amateur boxing
Representing Wales
Commonwealth Games
Silver medal – second place	1994 Victoria	Featherweight

Jason Cook (born 27 February 1975 in Maesteg, Wales) is a former professional boxer, who fought under the nickname "The Power". As an amateur, he won a silver medal for Wales at the 1994 Commonwealth Games. As a professional, he has fought as a lightweight, and has won both the European and IBO championships at the weight. He currently campaigns at Light-Welterweight, and fights out of Fight Academy Wales gym in Llanharan, South Wales under the guidance of professional coach Darren Wilson.

== Amateur career ==
Cook had a total of 86 amateur contests, winning 66. He won a silver medal in the featherweight (57 kg) class at the 1994 Commonwealth Games in Victoria, British Columbia, Canada.

He won the 1993 Amateur Boxing Association British featherweight title, when boxing out of the Maesteg BC.

=== Commonwealth Games results ===
- Defeated Francis Passingan (Papua New Guinea) points
- Defeated Daniel Attah (Nigeria) points
- Defeated Hassan Matumla (Tanzania) points
- Lost to Casey Patton (Canada) points

== Professional career ==
Cook's professional boxing career began in October 1996, with a second-round stoppage of Brian Robb, followed by further KO victories over Andrew Reed and David Kirk before being taken the distance on two occasions by Marc Smith. However, Cook then suffered a setback with a first-round knockout defeat at the hands of Trevor Smith. After the bout, Cook said "He clipped me with an overhand left and though I got up at six or seven, I was in no state to continue; the referee did the right thing."

After a nine-month lay-off, Cook returned to the ring to defeat Darren Woodley via a fourth-round knockout. Victories over journeymen David Hinds and Peter Buckley led to Cook receiving a shot at the vacant Welsh Area light welterweight title. On 11 December 1999, Cook won the vacant title with a first-round knockout of Woody Greenaway. Victories over Harry Butler, Andrei Sinepupov, Keith Jones, Assen Vassilev, and Dariusz Snarski followed, before a prison sentence momentarily ended Cook's boxing career.

=== Prison sentence ===
In 2001, Cook was found guilty of credit card fraud whilst working as a postman and was jailed for 15 months. Throughout his sentence, Cook kept himself in good shape and continued training on a punching bag that was supplied for him. Cook served a total of six months in prison with a further two months wearing an electronic tag.

=== Comeback and European title ===
Cook returned to the ring on 18 March 2002, with a knockout victory over Albanian boxer Fation Kacanolli. He followed this with point's victories over Russians Andrey Devyataykin and Viktor Baranov. On 23 July 2002, following the withdrawal of Bobby Vanzie, Cook was offered the chance to fight Sandro Casamonica in Italy for the vacant European lightweight title.

Ten days later, on 2 August 2002, Cook produced an upset by defeating Casamonica via a third-round knockout. Cook had started well winning the opening two rounds but was floored in the 3rd. As Casamonica moved in to finish the fight, he was hit with a left hook that brought an end the fight. After the bout a jubilant Cook said "It’s like a dream; my life has changed, it still hasn’t sunk in. That was the best punch I’ve thrown in my life, and it came when I most needed it. I’m ecstatic; I’m walking around on a cloud."

Cook's first defence of the title was against Frenchman Nasser Lakrib on 26 October 2002. Lakrib was stopped in the 5th round, in a fight which was held in Cook's hometown of Maesteg. Cook's next defence of the title was against Stefano Zoff, who he went on to defeat via a split point's decision. Despite the victory, Cook lost his European title before the bout when he failed to make the 135 lb lightweight limit.

=== IBO title ===
On 8 November 2003, Cook fought Argentinian Ariel Olveira for the vacant IBO lightweight title. Cook defeated Olveira by a 7th-round stoppage, after the Argentine's cornerman threw in the towel. Cook's first defence of the title was against reigning commonwealth champion Kevin Bennett on 1 May 2004. Cook outboxed Bennett to claim a close but unanimous points decision.

On 5 November 2004, Cook was scheduled to face South African Phillip Ndou in defence of his IBO title. However, on 21 October 2004, Ndou retired suddenly after a brain scan revealed a slight abnormality. Ndou had previously challenged Floyd Mayweather Jr. for the WBC lightweight title. A disappointed Cook said of the proposed bout "It would have been a great fight, I was thinking it could have been the British version of Hagler-Hearns. I might have had to pick myself off the canvas in that one but I'd have definitely come back and eventually prevailed."

The late replacement for Ndou was Argentinian Aldo Rios, who went on to stop Cook in the 3rd round. Cook had started the fight well but was floored in the 3rd by a straight right hand, and a follow-up attack from Rios forced referee Richard Davies to stop the contest. Following the bout Cook said "I took things a bit easy and got caught cold more than anything...This may have been a step too far, but I'll be back." Rios had previously lost to Ricky Hatton by knockout in a challenge for the WBU light welterweight title.

=== Retirement ===
On 25 November 2005, over a year after his last fight, Cook returned to the ring to face Gary Reid. Cook won the bout via disqualification after he was hit with a low blow and could not continue. In September, 2006, after pulling out of a fight with Giuseppe Lauri for the vacant European light welterweight title, Cook announced his retirement from boxing.

On his decision Cook said "It's time for me to go now. I've had so much trouble with the shoulder over the years and tendonitis in an ankle which flares up when I do roadwork that I can't carry on at the top level. If I was going to fight four, or six-rounders, it might be OK, but life as a journeyman is not for me."

=== Return with Prizefighter ===
On 20 October it was announced that Cook would be returning to the ring as part of Sky Sports Prizefighter series. The Competition will be held at light-welterweight. Also involved in the competition is fellow Welshman and former world champion Gavin Rees, a fighter from Enzo Calzaghe's boxing stable. Cook won his first round fight against Michael Grant, as the referee decided to stop the contest on the Doctors orders after Grant suffered a nasty cut. In the Semi-Final stage, Cook lost to Gavin Rees by a unanimous points decision, with Rees declaring that he was expecting the Final fight against Colin Lynes to be an easyer fight than his Semi-Final against Cook. The brave comeback performance by Cook earned him a shot at the British Light-Welterweight Title against Lenny Dawes

=== British Title Shot ===
Jason Cook challenged Lenny Dawes for the British Light-Welterweight Title on 12 February 2010 at York Hall, Bethnal Green in London. From the opening bell, Cook looked comfortable and slick and dominated the early rounds. Cook had Dawes visibly hurt in the 1st round, forcing Dawes to hold on to the Maesteg boxer to spare further punishment. After building up an early lead on the judges' scorecards and cutting Dawes, Cook began to tire and Dawes came back into the fight, having Cook in trouble in the 11th and 12th rounds. One judge awarded it 115–114 to Cook; one awarded it 115–114 to Dawes, with the other scoring it 114-114. The bout was declared a draw and Dawes regained his title. The gutsy performance by Cook moved him up the European and Commonwealth Light-Welterweight rankings

== Notable bouts ==
Result	Opponent	Type	Rd., Time	Date	Location	Notes
Loss	(Argentina) Aldo Rios	TKO	3 (12), 1.40	5 November 2004	Hereford, England	Lost IBO Lightweight title.
Win	(England) Kevin Bennett	Decision (unanimous)	12	1 May 2004	Bridgend, Wales	Defended IBO Lightweight title.
Win	(Argentina) Ariel Olveira	TKO	7 (12)	8 November 2003	Bridgend, Wales	Won vacant IBO Lightweight title.
Win	(Italy) Stefano Zoff	Decision (split)	12	25 January 2003	Bridgend, Wales	Lost European Lightweight title on scales.
Win	(France) Nasser Lakrib	TKO	5 (12)	26 October 2002	Maesteg, Wales	Defended European Lightweight title.
Win	(Italy) Sandro Casamonica	KO	3 (12)	2 August 2002	Calabria, Italy	Won European Lightweight title.

Achievements
Preceded by Stefano Zoff; Vacated	European Lightweight title 2 August 2002 – 24 January 2003; Stripped	Succeeded by Stefano Zoff
Preceded by Michael Ayers; Vacated	IBO Lightweight title 8 November 2003 – 5 November 2004	Succeeded by Aldo Rios
