= Shane Mosley vs. Vernon Forrest =

Boxing match

Sweet Revenge
- Date: January 26, 2002
- Venue: The Theater at Madison Square Garden, New York City, New York, U.S.
- Title(s) on the line: WBC and vacant The Ring welterweight titles

Tale of the tape
Boxer	Shane Mosley	Vernon Forrest
Nickname	Sugar	The Viper
Hometown	Pomona, California, U.S.	Augusta, Georgia, U.S.
Pre-fight record	38–0 (35 KO)	33–0 (1) (26 KO)
Age	30 years, 4 months	30 years, 11 months
Height	5 ft 9 in (175 cm)	6 ft 0 in (183 cm)
Weight	146 lb (66 kg)	147 lb (67 kg)
Style	Orthodox	Orthodox
Recognition	WBC; Welterweight champion The Ring; No. 1 Ranked Welterweight; The Ring No. 1 ranked pound-for-pound fighter 2-division world champion	The Ring; No. 3 Ranked Welterweight; Former welterweight champion

Result
- Forrest defeats Mosley via unanimous decision

Shane Mosley vs. Vernon Forrest, billed as Sweet Revenge, was a professional boxing match contested on January 26, 2002, for the WBC and The Ring welterweight championship.

== Background ==
Following his third defence of the welterweight belt he won from Oscar De La Hoya, stopping Adrian Stone in the 3rd round, Shane Mosley said he would looking towards either a rematch with De La Hoya, or a unification fight against unbeaten IBF champion Vernon Forrest.

Forrest meanwhile had finally secured his first world title, defeating Raul Frank at the second attempt (the first ending in a no contest) in May 2001.

In December 2001 it was confirmed that Mosley and Forrest would face off on January 26. The IBF would strip Forrest of their title for not defending against mandatory Michele Piccirillo.

Forrest was the last man to defeat Mosley, upsetting him in the 1992 Olympic trials just before he turned pro. Mosley denied he held a grudge against Forrest, saying in the build up "I forgot about the Olympic fight. The only thing I remember is I lost. They raised his hand, and I lost. After that, I put it all behind me. From that day forth, I swore to knock everyone out." Forrest was a 7 to 1 underdog.

== The fight ==
After a competitive 1st round, a clash of heads early in the 2nd cut Mosley on the hairline. After a brief pause the action resumed with Forrest hurting Mosley with combinations before catching him with a right that send him for the first time in his career. He quickly rose to his feet and continued but looked wobbly. Forrest would continue landing hard punches, with Mosley hitting the canvas again at the end of the round with the bell saving him from further attacks. Forrest would continue to outbox and dominate the action landing the cleaner and harder punches, with Mosley unable to change the tempo of the bout. In the 10th Forrest landed a hard right followed a hook, a right uppercut and another right that seemed to hurt Mosley, but the champion would last the full 12 round distance.

At the end of the bout, all three judges scored the bout for Forrest with Tom Kaczmarek having it, 115–110, Melvina Lathan 117–108 and Julie Lederman 118–108, making him a two time welterweight champion.

HBO's unofficial scorer Harold Lederman scored the bout 117–109 for Forrest.

== Aftermath ==
Speaking after the bout a jubilant Forrest said "Shane Mosley is supposed to be the best boxer in boxing. They call him the Michael Jordan of boxing, and I beat him. Am I going to be Michael Jordan?" Mosley was gracious in the defeat, but admitted that he fought the wrong fight saying "I want a rematch, I fought it wrong, probably should have boxed with him instead of pounded with him." He did praise Forrest saying "Vernon is an excellent fighter. He put combos together well."

== Undercard ==
Confirmed bouts:

Winner	Loser	Weight division/title belt(s) disputed	Result
(Canada) Arturo Gatti	(United States) Terron Millett	Welterweight (10 rounds)	4th round TKO
Preliminary bouts
(United States) José Celaya	(United States) Freddy Curiel	NABO Welterweight title	Unanimous decision
Non-TV bouts
(The Bahamas) Sherman Williams	(United States) Al Cole	Heavyweight (10 rounds)	Unanimous decision
(Canada) Tokunbo Olajide	(The Bahamas) Marvin Smith	Middleweight (6 rounds)	2nd round KO
(United States) Nick Acevedo	(United States) Kenito Drake	Light middleweight (6 rounds)	Unanimous decision

== Broadcasting ==
Country	Broadcaster
Australia	Main Event
United States	HBO

Preceded by vs. Adrian Stone	Shane Mosley's bouts 26 January 2002	Succeeded by Rematch
Preceded by vs. Edgar Ruiz	Vernon Forrest's bouts 26 January 2002	Succeeded by Rematch
