= Duncan Dokiwari =

Nigerian boxer (born 1973)

Personal information
- Nickname: Time
- Nationality: Nigerian
- Born: Duncan Dalnajeneso Danagogo Dokiwari; 15 October 1973 (age 52) Port Harcourt, Nigeria
- Height: 6 ft 4 in (193 cm)
- Weight: Heavyweight

Boxing career
- Reach: 80.5 in (204.5 cm)
- Stance: Orthodox

Boxing record
- Total fights: 28
- Wins: 25
- Win by KO: 22
- Losses: 3
- Draws: 0
- No contests: 0
Medal record
Men's amateur boxing
Representing Nigeria
Olympic Games
Bronze medal – third place	1996 Atlanta	Super heavyweight
All-Africa Games
Gold medal – first place	1995 Harare	Super heavyweight
Commonwealth Games
Gold medal – first place	1994 Victoria	Super heavyweight

Duncan Dalnajeneso Danagogo Dokiwari (born 15 October 1973) is a Nigerian former professional boxer who competed from 1997 to 2006. As an amateur, he won a men's super heavyweight bronze medal at the 1996 Summer Olympics.

== Background ==
Dokiwari is a descendant of the Kalabari people of the Niger Delta of Rivers State, Nigeria. He is a son of the Horsfall and David-West group of houses in Buguma, in the Asaritoru Local Government Area of Rivers State. Dokiwari is the fifth of eight children raised by their mother and grandmother. As a child, he played different sports ranging from track and fields, soccer, badminton, powerlifting, to volleyball, which has been evident in his agility and strength as a boxer. Dokiwari attended Port Harcout Primary School and Akpor Grammar School Ozuoba.

Dokiwari graduated with degrees in criminal justice and advertising from the University of Nevada, Las Vegas in the summer of 2008. He is an avid reader whose reading interest include philosophy, history, English literature, law and justice, as well as religious literature.

== Amateur career ==
Dokiwari came out of the same Nigerian amateur boxing program that produced the likes of Peter Konyegwache, David Izon, Richard Igbeneghu, Ike Ibeabuchi, and Friday Ahunanya. As a boxer Dokiwari was a late comer to the sport. He did not lace a pair of gloves until months after his 18th birthday. Within a span of five years from 1991 through 1996 Dokiwari rose from a virtually unknown in Nigerian boxing circle to become the country's foremost amateur boxing star. Dokiwari won the prestigious Eagle Belt champion of champions title consecutively between 1994 and 1995 in Lagos, Nigeria. Between 1993 through 1996 Duncan was Nigerian super heavyweight champion.

Dokiwari won the gold medal at the 1994 Commonwealth Games in Victoria, Canada. A year later he defeated the Cubans in Cuba by winning the gold medal at the Guama Cup International Boxing Championships. Also in 1995, he was proclaimed the African Boxer of the Year after winning the title at the African Games in Harare, Zimbabwe, where he knocked out all his opponents in the first round.

- Gold Medalist at the 1994 Commonwealth Games in Victoria, Australia.
  - Emilio Leti (Samoa) won by TKO 1
  - Danny Williams (England) won on points
  - David Anyim (Kenya) won on points
- Represented Nigeria as a Super Heavyweight at the 1996 Atlanta Olympic Games.
  - Mohammad Reza Samadi (Iran) won by TKO 2
  - Safarish Khan (Pakistan) won by TKO 2
  - Adalat Mamedov (Azerbaijan) won by TKO 3
  - Paea Wolfgramm (Tonga) lost on points, this was a semi-final match, and with the loss Dokiwari won a bronze medal.

== Professional career ==
Dokiwari's boxing career has been plagued with disputes with promoters and managers since turning professional in July 1997. Dokiwari's boxing skill has been honed by reputable trainer such as Eddie Futch, Thell Torrence, and Mike McCallum. Duncan dropped a decision to Fres Oquendo early in his career, and after running off 10 consecutive victories, dropped a unanimous decision to Dominick Guinn. A year after the loss to Guinn, Dokiwari was stunningly TKO'd in the first by unknown Stacy Frazier. Despite the loss, he continued his boxing career recording impressive wins against tough opposition. In December 2006 Dokiwari won the WBC USNBC Heavyweight title with an impressive 4th-round knockout of strong and durable Wllie Palms in Laughlin, Nevada. With the victory Dokiwari became the first man to stop Palms.

Outside the ring Dokiwari was also featured in the motion picture "Undisputed" with Wesley Snipes and Ving Rhames.

== Professional boxing record ==
25 Wins (22 knockouts, 3 decisions), 3 Losses (1 knockout, 2 decisions)
Result	Record	Opponent	Type	Round	Date	Location	Notes
Win	26-3	(United States) Willie Palms	TKO	4	01/12/2006	(United States) Avi Resort & Casino, Laughlin, Nevada	WBC USNBC Heavyweight Title. Referee stopped the bout at 1:39 of the fourth round.
Win	25-3	(United States) Kerry Biles	KO	2	08/10/2006	(United States) Marriott Arena, Junction City, Kansas	Biles knocked out at 3:00 of the second round.
Win	24-3	(United States) Patrick Smith	KO	2	26/08/2006	(United States) Junction City Convention Center, Junction City, Kansas	Smith knocked out at 2:33 of the second round.
Loss	23-3	(United States) Stacy Frazier	TKO	1	02/10/2004	(United States) Caesars Palace, Paradise, Nevada	Referee stopped the bout at 2:55 of the first round.
Loss	23-2	(United States) Dominick Guinn	UD	10	27/09/2003	(United States) HSBC Arena, Buffalo, New York	
Win	23-1	(United States) Carlton Johnson	TKO	3	26 Apr 2003	(United States) Foxwoods, Mashantucket, Connecticut	Referee stopped the bout at 2:40 of the third round.
Win	22-1	(United States) Andy Sample	TKO	1	07/11/2002	(United States) Centennial Garden, Bakersfield, California	Referee stopped the bout at 2:22 of the first round.
Win	21-1	(United States) Tali Kulihaapai	TKO	1	16/10/2002	(United States) Marriott Hotel, Irvine, California	Referee stopped the bout at 1:45 of the first round.
Win	20-1	(Venezuela) Armando Rodríguez	TKO	2	26/09/2002	(United States) Compaq Center, San Jose, California	Referee stopped the bout at 1:01 of the second round.
Win	19-1	(United States) David Vedder	UD	8	08/08/2002	(United States) Centennial Garden, Bakersfield, California	
Win	18-1	(United States) Tim Knight	KO	5	20 Jul 2002	(United States) Conseco Fieldhouse, Indianapolis, Indiana	Knight knocked out at 1:26 of the fifth round.
Win	17-1	(United States) Mike Sedillo	KO	2	27/06/2002	(United States) Marriott Hotel, Irvine, California	Sedillo knocked out at 0:44 of the second round.
Win	16-1	(Mexico) Agustin Corpus	UD	6	23/10/1999	(United States) MGM Grand Garden Arena, Paradise, Nevada	
Win	15-1	(United States) Matthew Brooks	TKO	1	25/07/1999	(United States) Harrah's Casino, Kansas City, Missouri	Referee stopped the bout at 2:44 of the first round.
Win	14-1	(Sudan) Clement Hassan	TKO	1	03/04/1999	(United States) The New Frontier, Paradise, Nevada	Referee stopped the bout at 3:00 of the first round.
Loss	13-1	(United States) Fres Oquendo	UD	6	16/01/1999	(United States) MGM Grand Garden Arena, Paradise, Nevada	
Win	13-0	(Puerto Rico) Miguel Otero	UD	4	03/12/1998	(United States) Casino Magic, Bay Saint Louis, Mississippi	
Win	12-0	(Jamaica) Rowyan Wallace	TKO	1	23/10/1998	(United States) Trump Marina, Atlantic City, New Jersey	Referee stopped the bout at 1:27 of the first round.
Win	10-0	(United States) Otis Tisdale	KO	1	19/05/1998	(United States) Memorial Coliseum, Corpus Christi, Texas	Tisdale knocked out at 2:08 of the first round.
Win	9-0	(United States) Larry Cureton	KO	1	17/04/1998	(United States) Mohegan Sun, Uncasville, Connecticut	
Win	8-0	(Puerto Rico) Joseph Kenneth Reyes	TKO	1	31/01/1998	(United States) Trump Taj Majal, Atlantic City, New Jersey	
Win	7-0	(United States) Mike Middleton	TKO	1	18/11/1997	(United States) Show Place Arena, Upper Marlboro, Maryland	Referee stopped the bout at 2:37 of the first round.
Win	6-0	(United States) Doug Phillips	TKO	1	03/10/1997	(United States) The Tropicana, Atlantic City, New Jersey	Referee stopped the bout at 1:05 of the first round.
Win	5-0	(United States) Derrick Edwards	KO	1	12/09/1997	(United States) Pikesville Armory, Pikesville, Maryland	Edwards knocked out at 1:02 of the first round.
Win	4-0	(United States) Jesse Shaw	KO	1	23/08/1997	(United States) Wild Wild West Casino, Atlantic City, New Jersey	
Win	3-0	(United States) Donnell Cummings	TKO	1	09/08/1997	(United States) South Padre Island, Texas	Referee stopped the bout at 1:04 of the first round.
Win	2-0	(United States) Shidevin Brown	TKO	2	20/07/1997	(United States) Fantasy Springs Resort Casino, Indio, California	
Win	1-0	(United States) Stanley Wooten	KO	1	05/07/1997	(United States) MARK of the Quad Cities, Moline, Illinois	Wooten knocked out at 2:59 of the first round.
