= Vernon Forrest vs. Shane Mosley II =

Boxing match

The Rematch of the Century
- Date: July 20, 2002
- Venue: Conseco Fieldhouse, Indianapolis, Indiana, U.S.
- Title(s) on the line: WBC and The Ring welterweight titles

Tale of the tape
Boxer	Vernon Forrest	Shane Mosley
Nickname	The Viper	Sugar
Hometown	Augusta, Georgia, U.S.	Pomona, California, U.S.
Purse	$3,420,000	$2,800,000
Pre-fight record	34–0 (1) (26 KO)	38–1 (35 KO)
Age	31 years, 5 months	30 years, 10 months
Height	6 ft 0 in (183 cm)	5 ft 9 in (175 cm)
Weight	147 lb (67 kg)	147 lb (67 kg)
Style	Orthodox	Orthodox
Recognition	WBC and The Ring; Welterweight champion	WBC; No. 1 Ranked Welterweight; The Ring No. 1 ranked pound-for-pound fighter 2-division world champion

Result
- Forrest defeats Mosley via unanimous decision

Vernon Forrest vs. Shane Mosley II, billed as The Rematch of the Century, was a professional boxing match contested on July 20, 2002, for the WBC and The Ring welterweight championship.

== Background ==
During their first fight in January 2002, Shane Mosley, who was ranked as the pound for pound best fighter in the world, was dropped twice en route to a shock unanimous decision loss to Vernon Forrest. In May Forrest and Mosley agreed to terms for a rematch for July 20 in Indianapolis, Indiana.

This time Forrest entered the bout as the slight favourite to win. Speaking before the bout he said "I'm taking the same mentality as I had last time, that it's do or die. To defeat him again would solidify what I did the first time." He also admitted that he needed to improve on his previous performance in order to repeat it, saying "I have to add to what I did last time, If I fight the same, I don't think that will be enough to win."

15,775 people attended the fight making it the largest boxing crowd ever in Indiana.

== The fight ==
Forrest kept on the outside using his height and reach as an advantage, as well as using his jab more effectively. His effective counter-punching was able to prevent Mosley from landing his powerful left hook.

The fight went the full 12 round distance. The scorecards were closer than the first fight, however still had Forrest as the winner with Gary Merritt scoring it 117–111, Tony Castellano 116-112 and Jerry Roth 115–113.

HBO's unofficial scorer Harold Lederman scored the bout 116–112 for Forrest while USA Today scored it 115–113 in favour of Forrest.

== Aftermath ==
Speaking after the bout Forrest said "He came out very, very aggressive the first couple of rounds, I knew it would be hard for him to maintain that pace for 12 rounds." Mosley meanwhile explained his strategy saying "My plan was to move in and catch him with a hard shot. I didn't get a chance to get that shot. It was a lot of clinch, move, clinch move."

== Undercard ==
Confirmed bouts:

Winner	Loser	Weight division/title belt(s) disputed	Result
(United States) Antonio Tarver	(United States) Eric Harding	Light heavyweight (10 rounds)	5th-round TKO
Non-TV bouts
(United States) José Celaya	(Mexico) Hector Quiroz	NABO Welterweight title	Unanimous technical decision
(United States) Nick Cook	(United States) George Blades	Indiana State Light heavyweight title	Unanimous decision
(United States) Clarence Vinson	(Mexico) Juan Jose Beltran	Super bantamweight (8 rounds)	Unanimous decision
(Nigeria) Duncan Dokiwari	(United States) Tim Knight	Heavyweight (6 rounds)	5th-round KO
(United States) Sherwin Davis	(Belize) Michael Soberanis	Light middleweight (6 rounds)	3rd-round TKO
(Mexico) Enrique Ruiz	(United States) Nick Flores	Heavyweight (4 rounds)	2nd-round TKO
(United States) Dimitrique Edwards	(United States) Patrick Lewis	Cruiserweight (4 rounds)	Unanimous decision
(United States) Xavier Toliver	(United States) Mark Scott	Light middleweight (4 rounds)	1st-round TKO

== Broadcasting ==
Country	Broadcaster
Australia	Main Event
United States	HBO

Preceded by First bout	Shane Mosley's bouts 20 July 2002	Succeeded by vs. Raúl Márquez
Preceded by First bout	Vernon Forrest's bouts 20 July 2002	Succeeded by vs. Ricardo Mayorga
