= Vernon Forrest vs. Ricardo Mayorga =

Professional boxing match

- Date: 25 January 2003
- Venue: Pechanga Resort and Casino, Temecula, California, US
- Title(s) on the line: WBA, WBC and The Ring welterweight championship

Tale of the tape
Boxer	(United States) Vernon Forrest	(Nicaragua) Ricardo Mayorga
Nickname	"The Viper"	"El Matador"
Hometown	Atlanta, Georgia, US	Masaya, Masaya, Nicaragua
Pre-fight record	35–0 (1) (26 KO)	23–3–1 (1) (21 KO)
Age	31 years, 11 months	29 years, 3 months
Height	6 ft 0 in (183 cm)	5 ft 9 in (175 cm)
Weight	146 1/2 lb (66 kg)	146 lb (66 kg)
Style	Orthodox	Orthodox
Recognition	WBC and The Ring; Welterweight Champion; The Ring No. 4 ranked pound-for-pound fighter	WBA; Welterweight Champion; The Ring; No. 1 Ranked Welterweight

Result
- Mayorga via third round TKO

Vernon Forrest vs. Ricardo Mayorga was a professional boxing match contested on January 25, 2003, at Pechanga Resort & Casino in Temecula, California. The fight was a unification match, with Forrest's World Boxing Council and The Ring welterweight world championships at stake along with Mayorga's World Boxing Association Super championship.

== Background ==
Forrest had won the WBC welterweight championship from Shane Mosley on January 26, 2002, at The Theater at Madison Square Garden Despite being a 7 to 1 underdog and facing a fighter who had been regarded as the best pound-for-pound fighter in the world at that time, Forrest won a lopsided unanimous decision in a fight where he dropped Mosley twice. Mosley sought an immediate rematch, which took place in Indianapolis on July 20, 2002; although the fight was closer on the scorecards this time, Forrest managed to retain his championship.

Mayorga had fought for and won several regional Latin American light welterweight and welterweight championships by the time he stepped in the ring with Andrew Lewis for the WBA welterweight championship on July 28, 2001, in Los Angeles. The fight ended in a no contest after Lewis was cut by an accidental clash of heads in the second round. Mayorga would emerge victorious in the rematch on March 30, 2002, in Reading, Pennsylvania, knocking Lewis out in the fifth round.

=== Fight information ===
The bout was televised by HBO as part of its then-ongoing World Championship Boxing series. Jim Lampley called the fight with Larry Merchant and George Foreman as analysts. Harold Lederman served as unofficial scorekeeper.

The fight's referee was Marty Denkin, with Raul Caiz, Sr., John Keane, and Jon Schorle acting as judges.

== The fight ==
Forrest began the fight by refusing to touch gloves with Mayorga. Mayorga responded by coming out aggressively against the WBC champion, landing an early power shot that hurt Forrest. Eventually his punches resulted in Forrest going down, and Mayorga continued the aggressive punching as the bell rang to end the round. Forrest responded in the second round by going with a more aggressive strategy, implored on by his opponent who refused to back down.

Mayorga would land a hard shot to Forrest's head in the third round that buckled Forrest's legs as he went down for a second time. Denkin began his count as Forrest staggered to his feet, but after Forrest failed to respond to his questions after taking the count, Denkin called a halt to the fight and Mayorga won by technical knockout.

== Aftermath ==
He celebrated his victory, among other ways, by smoking a cigarette during his postfight interview; Mayorga, when not training, was known to be a heavy smoker.

== Undercard ==
Confirmed bouts:

== Broadcasting ==
Country	Broadcaster
United Kingdom	BBC (Highlights)
United States	HBO

Preceded by vs. Shane Mosley II	Vernon Forrest's bouts 25 January 2003	Succeeded by Rematch
Preceded by vs. Andrew Lewis II	Ricardo Mayorga's bouts 25 January 2003	Succeeded by Rematch
