= Uganda at the 1994 Commonwealth Games =

Sporting event delegation

Flag of Uganda

The Official Logo of the Uganda Commonwealth Games Association

Uganda at the 1994 Commonwealth Games was abbreviated UGA. It took place in Victoria, Canada and Uganda won 2 bronze medals at the games. Both of the two medals were won in boxing. Uganda's performance highlighted its strength in boxing, continuing a legacy of success in the sport at the Commonwealth Games.

== Medals ==
Both of the two medals won in these games were won in boxing.

	Gold	Silver	Bronze	Total
Uganda	0	0	2	2

=== Gold ===
- none

=== Silver ===
- none

=== Bronze ===
- Fred Mutuweta — Boxing, Men's Bantamweight
- Charles Kizza — Boxing, Men's Heavyweight
