= Jason Rowland =

English boxer

Personal information
- Nationality: British
- Born: 6 August 1970 (age 55) London, England
- Height: 5 ft 10 in (178 cm)
- Weight: Light welterweight

Boxing career
- Stance: Orthodox

Boxing record
- Total fights: 28
- Wins: 26
- Win by KO: 14
- Losses: 2

Jason Rowland (born 6 August 1970) is a British former boxer who was British light welterweight champion between 1998 and 2000, and WBU light welterweight World champion in 2000.

== Career ==
Born in London and based in West Ham, Rowland made his professional debut in September 1989 with a win over Terry Smith. He won his first 19 fights, leading to a British title eliminator against Bernard Paul in November 1995, with the BBBofC Southern Area title also at stake; Rowland was knocked out in the first round.

After being out of the ring in 1996, Rowland won his two fights in 1997, and in May 1998 challenged for the British title that was then held by Mark Winters; Rowland won on points to become British champion. He successfully defended the title in November 1999, stopping Jon Thaxton on a cut in the fifth round at the York Hall, Bethnal Green. He relinquished the title the following year to pursue a world title.

He was due to fight Zab Judah for the IBF world title in mid-2000 but had to pull out after one of his pitbull terriers bit off part of his left index finger. In October 2000 he beat Viktor Baranov by unanimous decision to take the vacant WBU light welterweight title. Rowland vacated the title, and by July 2001 Ricky Hatton held the WBU title and faced Rowland in his first defence, knocking him out in the fourth round.

It was almost two years before Rowland fought again, beating Paul Denton in April 2003 in what was his final fight.

Rowland became a successful trainer, working with boxers such as Tony Conquest, John Wayne Hibbert, Richard Hines, Miles Shinkwin, and Mitchell Smith, and in 2010 opened the Noble Art Gym in Rainham.
