= Richard Rowles =

Australian boxer

Personal information
- Nationality: Australian
- Born: 3 January 1973 (age 53) Lae, Papua New Guinea

Sport
- Sport: Boxing
Medal record
Men's amateur boxing
Representing Australia
Commonwealth Games
Bronze medal – third place	1994 Victoria	Welterweight

Richard Rowles (born 3 January 1973) is a former light middleweight boxer, who represented Australia at two consecutive Summer Olympics, starting in 1996 and 2000 Summer Olympics. He won a bronze medal at the 1994 Commonwealth Games in Victoria, British Columbia, Canada.

Born in Lae, in Papua New Guinea, Rowles later on moved to Brisbane, where he was based at Brisbane's Lang Park Amateur Boxing Club, alongside Lang Park.

He was an Australian Institute of Sport scholarship holder.
