= Bernard Paul =

Bernard Paul may refer to:

- Bernard Paul (director), French film director and screenwriter
- Bernard Paul (boxer), Mauritian/British boxer
- Bernard Paul (tennis) (born 1944), French tennis player
