= Arshad Hussain (boxer, born 1967) =

Pakistani boxer (born 1967)

Personal information
- Born: 3 March 1967 (age 59)

Sport
- Sport: Boxing
Medal record
Men's amateur boxing
Representing Pakistan
Commonwealth Games
Bronze medal – third place	1994 Victoria	Lightweight

Arshad Hussain (born 3 March 1967) is a retired boxer from Pakistan. He competed at the 1992 Summer Olympics, and the 1994 Commonwealth Games, where he won a bronze medal for boxing in the Men's Lightweight class.
