= Spencer Oliver (boxer) =

English boxer

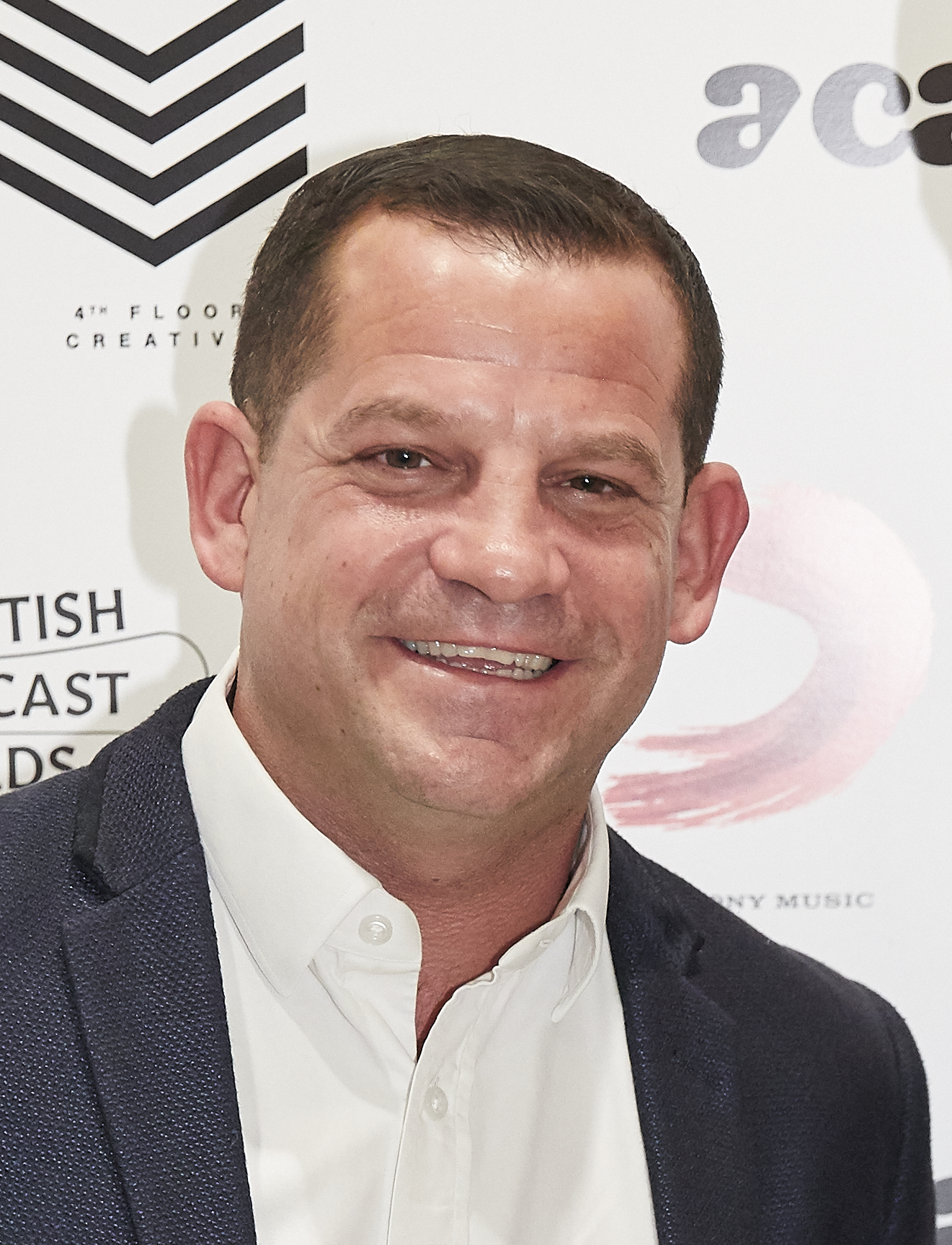

Personal information
- Nickname: The Omen
- Nationality: British / English
- Born: 27 March 1975 (age 51) London, United Kingdom
- Height: 1.63 m (5 ft 4 in)

Boxing career

Boxing record
- Total fights: 15
- Wins: 14
- Win by KO: 9
- Losses: 1
Medal record
Men's amateur boxing
Representing England
Commonwealth Games
Silver medal – second place	1994 Victoria	Bantamweight

Spencer Oliver (born 27 March 1975) is an English former professional boxer. He was nicknamed "The Omen".

Oliver won a silver medal for England in the bantamweight division at the 1994 Commonwealth Games in Victoria, Canada.

== Professional career ==
From 1995 to 1998, Oliver competed as a professional. When he defeated Bulgaria's Martin Krastev in May 1997 he became the European (EBU) super bantamweight champion. He held onto the title for a year, defending it on three occasions with wins over Serge Poilblan, Vincenzo Belcastro and Fabrice Benichou.

=== Injury ===
In May 1998 he sought to defend his title again with a bout against Sergey Devakov at Royal Albert Hall in London—which ended with Oliver suffering life-threatening injuries. Two minutes into the 10th round, Oliver was felled by a right hook and was counted out, the first loss of his career. It then became apparent that Spencer was seriously injured, a blood clot had formed in his brain, caused by a blood vessel that had been torn from a blow he received earlier in the fight. Spencer's cutman, Eddie Carter, is credited for saving his life by instructing the paramedics to sedate the boxer in order to minimise the damage. For 15 minutes he was treated in the ring by paramedics and supplied with oxygen, before being taken unconscious to Charing Cross Hospital. He was later transferred to a specialist neurology hospital and underwent a successful operation to remove the blood clot.

== Later life ==
Oliver now works as a pundit for Sky Sports and Talksport, and runs a boxing school in Edgware, London. Oliver also formerly hosted a boxing podcast with Jake Wood called Pound for Pound.
