= Omar Ahmed =

Kenyan boxer (born 1979)

Personal information
- Full name: Omar Ahmed Abdelkader; Ahmed Rajab Omari
- Born: 29 December 1979 (age 46)
- Height: 183 cm (6 ft 0 in)
- Weight: 91 kg (201 lb)

Sport
- Sport: Boxing
Medal record
Men's amateur boxing
Representing Kenya
All-Africa Games
Gold medal – first place	1995 Harare	Heavyweight
Commonwealth Games
Gold medal – first place	1994 Victoria	Heavyweight

Omar Ahmed Abdelkader (born 29 December 1979) is an amateur boxer from Kenya, who is also known as Omar Ahmed, Ahmed Abdelkader, or Ahmed Rajab Omari. He is best known for winning the gold medal in the men's heavyweight division (– 91 kg) at the 1995 All-Africa Games in Harare, Zimbabwe.

Ahmed represented his native country at the 1996 Summer Olympics in Atlanta, United States, being the youngest member (16 years, 205 days) of the Kenyan Olympic Team. There he was defeated in the second round by David Defiagbon from Canada. Omar also won a gold medal in the Men's Heavyweight Division at the 1994 Commonwealth Games in Victoria, Canada.
