= Rasmus Ojemaye =

Nigerian boxer

Personal information
- Nationality: Nigerian
- Born: 28 May 1969 (age 57) Nigeria
- Height: 178 cm (5 ft 10 in)
- Weight: 91 kg (201 lb)

Sport
- Sport: Boxing
Medal record
Men's amateur boxing
Representing Nigeria
Commonwealth Games
Silver medal – second place	1994 Victoria	Middleweight

Rasmus Ojemaye (born 28 May 1969) is a Nigerian former boxer. He competed in the men's heavyweight event at the 2000 Summer Olympics. Ojemaye's last competitive boxing match took place on 8 May 2002 at the Equinox Nightclub in Leicester Square, London, United Kingdom.
