= Ricardo Mayorga vs. Vernon Forrest II =

Boxing match

Battle of Orleans
- Date: July 12, 2003
- Venue: Orleans Arena, Paradise, Nevada, U.S.
- Title(s) on the line: WBA, WBC and The Ring welterweight championship

Tale of the tape
Boxer	Ricardo Mayorga	Vernon Forrest
Nickname	El Matador (The Killer)	The Viper
Hometown	Masaya, Masaya, Nicaragua	Atlanta, Georgia, U.S.
Pre-fight record	24–3–1 (22 KO)	35–1 (26 KO)
Age	29 years, 9 months	32 years, 5 months
Height	5 ft 9 in (175 cm)	6 ft 0 in (183 cm)
Weight	146 lb (66 kg)	147 lb (67 kg)
Style	Orthodox	Orthodox
Recognition	WBA, WBC and The Ring; Welterweight Champion; The Ring No. 8 ranked pound-for-pound fighter	WBC/The Ring; No. 1 Ranked Welterweight; WBA; No. 4 Ranked Welterweight; The Ring No. 9 ranked pound-for-pound fighter

Result
- Mayorga via 12th round MD

Ricardo Mayorga vs. Vernon Forrest II, billed as the Battle of Orleans, was a professional boxing match contested on 12 July 2003, for the WBA, WBC and The Ring welterweight championship.

== Background ==
After his upset victory over Vernon Forrest in January 2003, unified welterweight champion Ricardo Mayorga agreed to an immediate rematch. Speaking that a media event to announce the re-match on 20 May, Mayorga said: "He is going down. I am hungrier for this fight than I have ever been. I invite everybody to come out and watch two great rounds of boxing."

== The fights ==
=== Undercard ===
On the untelevised portion of the card, Pete Frissina defeated Jesús Salvador Pérez by split decision in an IBF bantamweight title eliminator.

Vivian Harris successfully defended his WBA (Regular) belt against No. 1 ranked Souleymane M'baye. Harris dropped his unbeaten opponent in the 2nd round en route to a unanimous decision victory. With two judges scoring the bout 116–111 and one having it 117–110.

=== Corley vs. Judah ===
Battle of Orleans: DeMarcus Corley vs. Zab Judah
- Title(s) on the line: WBO light welterweight title

Tale of the tape
Boxer	DeMarcus Corley	Zab Judah
Nickname	"Chop Chop"	"Super"
Hometown	Washington, D.C., District of Columbia, U.S.	Brownsville, New York, U.S.
Purse	$150,000	$100,000
Pre-fight record	28–1–1 (16 KO)	28–1 (1) (21 KO)
Age	29 years, 1 month	25 years, 8 months
Height	5 ft 7 in (170 cm)	5 ft 7 in (170 cm)
Weight	139 1/2 lb (63 kg)	140 lb (64 kg)
Style	Southpaw	Southpaw
Recognition	WBO; Light Welterweight Champion; The Ring; No. 4 Ranked Light Welterweight	WBO; No. 4 Light Ranked Welterweight; The Ring; No. 2 Ranked Light Welterweight; Former light welterweight champion

Result
- Judah defeats Corley by split decision

In the first of the two televised bouts, WBO light welterweight titleholder DeMarcus Corley made the third defence of his title against former IBF junior welterweight champion Zab Judah.

Speaking before the bout Corley would admit that this was his biggest fight thus far saying "Is this the biggest fight I've had? You could say that, yeah, I think because it's on HBO and they say once you made it to HBO, you've made it. So it's a test for me to display my talent all over the world, also to HBO, to see what I can do." He would also suggest that he was aiming to challenge undisputed light welterweight champion Kostya Tszyu.

Judah meanwhile had been out of the ring for almost a year, having been involved in legal disputes with his former promoter, Main Events. Having signed with new promoter Don King, a match up with fellow King fighter Corley was arranged. The two men had been involved in brawl at a bar in Philadelphia in March. Judah had giving an interview to Ring magazine after the Bernard Hopkins vs. Morrade Hakkar bout when Corley walked past. After an exchange of words Judah threw a punch at Corley prompting a scuffle with flying chairs and phones before the police broke it up.

==== The fight ====
The champion was dropped by a looping left from Judah in the third round. Corley would work himself back into the bout during the middle rounds but Judah was able to control most of the fight by jabbing and moving and making Corley miss with his best punches.

At the end of 12 rounds judge Duane Ford, scored it 115–112 for Corley while judges Chuck Giampa and Michael Pernik, scored it 115–112 for Judah, giving him a split decision victory. HBO's unofficial scorer Harold Lederman had it 116–111 for Judah.

==== Aftermath ====
Speaking after bout Judah said "I felt a little rusty with a year off, but I think I had a great fight."

Corley meanwhile felt like he had done enough saying "He caught me with one fast punch that knocked me down, I still thought I won, despite the knockdown. I'd love to fight him again, but next time I'd put more pressure on him."

Preceded by vs. Randall Bailey	DeMarcus Corley's bouts 12 July 2003	Succeeded by vs. Floyd Mayweather Jr.
Preceded by vs. Omar Gabriel Weis	Zab Judah's bouts 12 July 2003	Succeeded by vs. Jaime Rangel

=== Main Event ===
Mayorga would dominate much of the first half of the bout rocking Forrest in the second round. Forrest would take control from the halfway point as Mayorga tired, before the champion would come back to end the bout on top.

After 12 rounds Jerry Roth scored the bout a draw at 114-114, but Larry O'Connell had it 115-114 and Ove Oveson had 116-112 both for Mayorga giving him a majority decision victory. Unofficial HBO scorer Harold Lederman had it 115–113 in favour of Mayorga, while the LA Times scored it 114–114.

== Aftermath ==
Speaking in ring after the bout Mayorga would say "Forrest is a sissy and doesn't punch that hard. He fought a lot better this time, he could have beaten most welterweights." He would later state he wanted to face unified light middleweight champion Oscar De La Hoya next.

== Undercard ==
Confirmed bouts:

Winner	Loser	Weight division/title belt(s) disputed	Result
(United States) Zab Judah	(United States) DeMarcus Corley	WBO Light Welterweight Championship	Split decision.
Non-TV bouts
(Guyana) Vivian Harris	(France) Souleymane M'baye	WBA (Regular) Light Welterweight Championship	Unanimous decision.
(United States) Pete Frissina	(Colombia) Jesús Salvador Pérez	IBF Bantamweight Title Eliminator	Split decision.
(Canada) Syd Vanderpool	(United States) Demetrius Jenkins	Light Heavyweight (10 rounds)	9th-round TKO.
(United States) Kili Madrid	(United States) Marteze Logan	Welterweight (4 rounds)	Majority Draw.
(Croatia) Mario Preskar	(United States) Roman Armstrong	Heavyweight (4 rounds)	1st-round TKO.

== Broadcasting ==
Country	Broadcaster
United Kingdom	BBC (Highlights)
United States	HBO

Preceded by First bout	Ricardo Mayorga's bouts 12 July 2003	Succeeded by vs. Cory Spinks
Preceded by First bout	Vernon Forrest's bouts 12 July 2003	Succeeded by vs. Sergio Rios
