= Mark Winters =

Irish boxer

Personal information
- Nickname: The Natural
- Nationality: British/Irish
- Born: 29 December 1971 (age 54) Antrim, County Antrim, Northern Ireland
- Height: 5 ft 8 in (173 cm)
- Weight: Light welterweight, welterweight, lightweight

Boxing career

Boxing record
- Total fights: 25
- Wins: 18
- Win by KO: 5
- Losses: 5
- Draws: 2
Medal record
Men's amateur boxing
Representing Northern Ireland
Commonwealth Games
Silver medal – second place	1994 Victoria	Light welterweight

Mark Winters (born 29 December 1971) is a former boxer from Northern Ireland. He was British light welterweight champion between 1997 and 1998.

== Career ==
Born in Antrim, Winters first had success as an amateur, winning the Irish National senior lightweight title in 1993, fighting at the 1993 World Amateur Boxing Championships in Tampere, and winning a silver medal at the 1994 Commonwealth Games in Victoria, British Columbia, Canada.

Winters made his professional debut in March 1995 with a win over Trevor Smith. After winning his first 11 fights he became British light welterweight champion in October 1997 after beating Carl Wright on points at the Sheffield Arena. Wright required surgery after the fight due to a blood clot on the brain, but later recovered. Winters successfully defended the title in February 1998 against Bernard Paul, but lost it three months later when he was beaten on points by Jason Rowland, the first defeat of Winters' career.

Winters also lost on points in September 1998 to Junior Witter, but in December 1999 challenged for Ricky Hatton's WBO Inter-continental title in Liverpool. Hatton stopped him in the fourth round and Winters announced his retirement from boxing.

Winters returned to the ring in 2001, and having earlier fallen out with promoter Frank Warren, joined John Breen's gym in Belfast. After having struggled to make the weight against Hatton, Winters returned at welterweight before a change of diet and training regime saw him able to drop to lightweight, and in December faced Graham Earl in an eliminator for the British title at the Wembley Conference Centre. The previously unbeaten Earl won on points. Winters fought a draw with Martin Watson in October 2003, and the two met a year later in Glasgow with Watson's BBBofC Celtic title at stake; Watson won comfortably on points. This proved to be Winters' final fight.
