= Tijani Moro =

Ghanaian boxer

Personal information
- Born: 8 May 1978 (age 48)

Sport
- Sport: Boxing
Medal record
Men's amateur boxing
Representing Ghana
Commonwealth Games
Bronze medal – third place	1994 Victoria	Light welterweight

Tijani Moro (born 8 May 1978) is a Ghanaian boxer. He represented Ghana at the 1994 Commonwealth Games, where he won a bronze medal.
