= Peter Odhiambo (boxer, born 1966) =

Kenyan boxer

Personal information
- Full name: Peter Opiyo Odhiambo
- Born: 20 October 1966 (age 59) Nyeri, Kenya

Sport
- Sport: Boxing
Medal record
Men's amateur boxing
Representing Kenya
All-Africa Games
Gold medal – first place	1995 Harare	Light heavyweight
Commonwealth Games
Bronze medal – third place	1994 Victoria	Light heavyweight

Peter Opiyo Odhiambo (born 20 October 1966), known as Peter Odhiambo, is a retired boxer from Kenya, who competed for his native country in the Men's Light Heavyweight (– 81 kg) at the 1996 Summer Olympics. One year earlier, he captured the gold medal in his weight division at the 1995 All-Africa Games in Harare, Zimbabwe. Odhiambo is nicknamed "Dynamite".
