= Rowan Donaldson =

Canadian boxer (born 1970)

Personal information
- Nationality: Canadian, Jamaican
- Born: 6 September 1970 (age 55)

Sport
- Sport: Boxing
Medal record
Men's amateur boxing
Representing Canada
Commonwealth Games
Gold medal – first place	1994 Victoria	Middleweight

Rowan Donaldson (born 6 September 1970) is a former Canadian and Jamaican boxer. Representing Jamaica, he competed in the men's middleweight event at the 1996 Summer Olympics. Earlier, while representing Canada, he won a gold medal in the 1994 Commonwealth Games in the middleweight category. He competed for Jamaica in the 1998 Commonwealth Games.

Donaldson attended Howard S. Billings Regional High School in Châteauguay, Quebec.
