= Jake Wood =

English actor (born 1972)

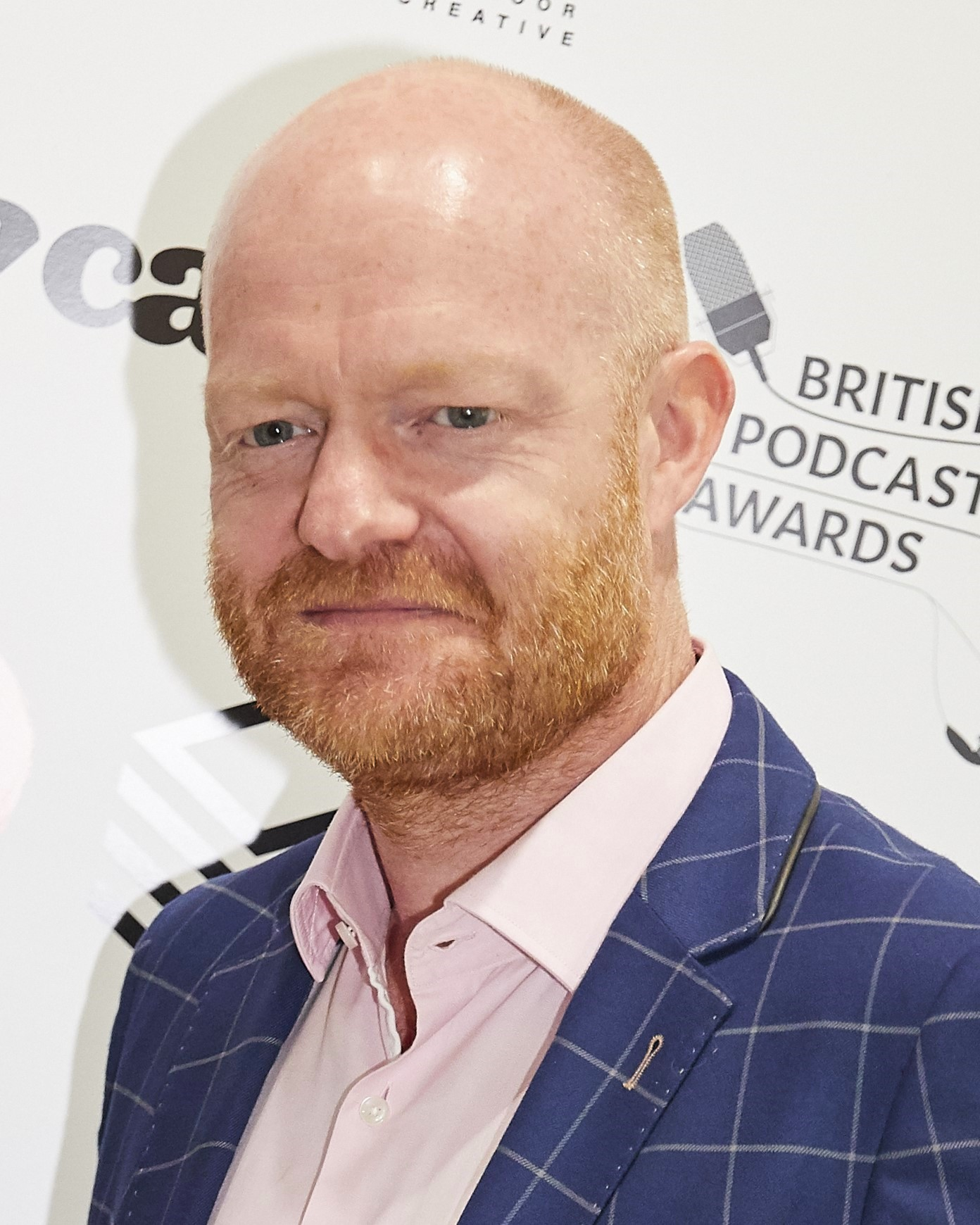
- Wood in 2018
- Born: Jake Dylan Wood; 12 July 1972 (age 54); Westminster, London, England
- Education: Anna Scher Drama School
- Occupation: Actor
- Years active: 1984–present
- Known for: EastEnders; 2:22 A Ghost Story
- Spouse: Alison Wood (m. 2001)
- Children: 2

Jake Dylan Wood (born 12 July 1972) is a British actor and podcaster from Westminster, known for his role as Max Branning in the BBC soap opera EastEnders. He has also made guest appearances in series including Only Fools and Horses and Red Dwarf. In 2014, Wood competed on BBC's Strictly Come Dancing alongside professional dancer Janette Manrara. In the United States, he is known as the voice of the GEICO gecko in a series of television adverts for the American insurance company GEICO. In 2018, he began co-hosting Pound for Pound, a boxing podcast with Spencer Oliver.

== Early life ==
Jake Dylan Wood was born on 12 July 1972 in Westminster, London, to an English father and a French mother. He attended City of London Academy Highbury Grove and trained as an actor at the Anna Scher Drama School in Islington, North London.

== Career ==
His first acting role was in the 1984 television series The Gentle Touch. He has since appeared in several television series including May to December, Minder, Only Fools and Horses, Nightingales, Murder in Mind, Press Gang, London's Burning, Casualty, In Deep, Sean's Show, Inspector Morse Driven to Distraction 1989, One Foot in the Grave, Red Dwarf, A Touch of Frost, The Bill, Le Café des Rêves, Sea of Souls, Doc Martin and The Thin Blue Line. He has appeared in the films Flesh and Blood (1985) with Rutger Hauer and Jennifer Jason Leigh, Crimetime (1996) with Stephen Baldwin, Tube Tales (1999), The Aryan Couple (2004) and The Illusionist (2006) opposite Edward Norton. Wood starred in the 1989 Yellow pages TV advert, entitled "Party Party", and is the voice of the GEICO gecko advertisements on American television. Wood also featured alongside Cobent CTO and ex-Metal Hammer journalist Tony Dillon as part of a team presenting Click, a computer games magazine on video in the early 1990s. In 1989, Wood appeared in Only Fools and Horses as an assistant for Rodney Trotter (Nicholas Lyndhurst), in the episode The Jolly Boys' Outing. In the 8th series of Red Dwarf he played Kill Crazy, a prison inmate. Wood also played the eldest son, Dougie, in sitcom family The Wilsons.

In 1990, Wood portrayed the role of Jackson for two episodes in the BBC soap opera EastEnders, a minor character who met Diane Butcher (Sophie Lawrence) while she was sleeping rough on the streets of London. Wood was later cast to play the regular character Max Branning from June 2006 to February 2021. In 2014, Wood took part in the 12th series of Strictly Come Dancing. He was partnered with Janette Manrara, reaching the semi-final. In May 2015, Wood announced that he would be taking a year-long break from EastEnders. Wood said "I have been at EastEnders for nine years and I feel the time is right to give Max a break. It won't be for too long as I shall be back next year to see Max face another chapter of drama."

In January 2018, Wood started hosting a boxing podcast, Pound for Pound, with Spencer Oliver. In September 2020, it was announced that Wood would be departing from the cast of EastEnders after fifteen years in the role, with Max being written out as part of an "explosive exit". His departure aired on 19 February 2021.

In July 2025, it was announced that Wood would be returning to EastEnders as Max. His return scenes aired on 3 September.

In December 2025, he appeared as himself in The Celebrity Apprentice in aid of Children in Need.

== Personal life ==
Wood is a fan of Arsenal and took part in the 2007 Great North Run. He lives in Hertfordshire with his wife, Alison, whom he married in 2001, and their two children.

In 2019, he ran the London Marathon with fellow EastEnders cast members for a dementia campaign in honour of Barbara Windsor.
