= Peter Richardson (boxer) =

British boxer

Personal information
- Nationality: British
- Born: 24 June 1970 (age 56) Middlesbrough, England

Sport
- Sport: Boxing
Medal record
Men's amateur boxing
Representing England
Commonwealth Games
Gold medal – first place	1994 Victoria	Light welterweight

Peter Richardson (born 24 June 1970) is a retired British boxer.

== Boxing career ==
He competed in the men's light welterweight event at the 1992 Summer Olympics. He beat Vernon Forrest in the first round.

He represented England in the lightweight division, at the 1990 Commonwealth Games in Auckland, New Zealand and reached the quarter-finals. Four years later he won the gold medal at the 1994 Commonwealth Games.

Boxing for the Philip Thomas School of Boxing ABC, Richardson won the prestigious ABA featherweight championship in 1989. Four years later he won the 1993 ABA light-welterweight championship.
