= France Mabiletsa =

Botswana boxer (born 1962)

Personal information
- Full name: France Lassie Mabiletsa
- Nationality: Botswana
- Born: November 25, 1962 (age 63)
- Height: 1.85 m (6 ft 1 in)
- Weight: 80 kg (176 lb)

Sport
- Sport: Boxing
- Weight class: Light-Heavyweight
Medal record
Men's amateur boxing
Representing Botswana
Commonwealth Games
Bronze medal – third place	1994 Victoria	Light heavyweight

France Lassie Mabiletsa (born 25 November 1962), known as France Mabiletsa, is an Olympic light heavyweight boxer from Botswana. He won a bronze medal at the 1994 Commonwealth Games and competed at the 1992 Summer Olympics.
