= James Swan (boxer) =

Australian boxer

Personal information
- Born: 6 July 1974 (age 52) Alice Springs, Northern Territory, Australia

Sport
- Sport: Boxing
Medal record
Men's amateur boxing
Representing Australia
Commonwealth Games
Bronze medal – third place	1994 Victoria	Featherweight

James Swan (born 6 July 1974) was born in Alice Springs, Northern Territory and is an Indigenous bantamweight boxer from Australia, who represented his native country at 1996 and 2000 Summer Olympics.

Swan won bronze medals at 1994 and 1998 Commonwealth Games.

He was an Australian Institute of Sport scholarship holder.

He is a member of the Aboriginal and Islander Sports Hall of Fame.
