= Danny Costello =

Retired boxer who competed for England

Personal information
- Nationality: England
- Born: 21 August 1975 (age 51) Lambeth, London
- Died: 24th February
Medal record
Boxing
Representing England
Commonwealth Games
Bronze medal – third place	1994 Victoria	51kg flyweight

Daniel 'Danny' Costello (1975 – 25 February 2025) was a male retired boxer who competed for England. He died 25 February 2025.

== Boxing career ==
Costello was three times National Champion in 1994, 1995 and 1996 after winning the prestigious ABA flyweight title, boxing out of the Hollington ABC.

He represented England and won a bronze medal in the flyweight (-51 kg) division, at the 1994 Commonwealth Games in Victoria, British Columbia, Canada.

He turned professional on 26 October 1996 and fought in 7 fights until 2004.
