= Shailer =

Shailer may refer to:

- Trevor Shailer (born 1970), New Zealand boxer
- Shailer Mathews (1863–1941), American theologian
- Shailer Park, Queensland, suburb
