= Joe Calzaghe vs. Mikkel Kessler =

Boxing competition

- Date: 3 November 2007
- Venue: Millennium Stadium, Cardiff, Wales, UK
- Title(s) on the line: WBA (Undisputed), WBC, WBO and The Ring super middleweight titles

Tale of the tape
Boxer	(United Kingdom) Joe Calzaghe	(Denmark) Mikkel Kessler
Nickname	"Pride of Wales"	"Viking Warrior"
Hometown	Newbridge, Caerphilly, Wales	Copenhagen, Capital Region, Denmark
Pre-fight record	43–0 (32 KO)	39–0 (29 KO)
Age	35 years, 7 months	28 years, 8 months
Height	6 ft 0 in (183 cm)	6 ft 1 in (185 cm)
Weight	166 1/2 lb (76 kg)	168 lb (76 kg)
Style	Southpaw	Orthodox
Recognition	WBO and The Ring; Super Middleweight Champion; The Ring No. 8 ranked pound-for-pound fighter	WBA (Unified) and WBC; Super Middleweight Champion; The Ring; No. 1 Ranked Super Middleweight

Result
- Calzaghe defeated Kessler via Unanimous decision

Joe Calzaghe vs. Mikkel Kessler was a professional boxing match contested on 3 November 2007, for the WBA, WBC, WBO, and The Ring super middleweight championship. Calzaghe won by unanimous decision.

== Background ==
Joe Calzaghe entered the contest having held the WBO version of the World super middleweight title for nine years, originally beating Chris Eubank for the vacant belt in 1997. He had defended the belt a total of twenty times and had also briefly held the IBF version of the title following a victory over American Jeff Lacy where he won The Ring belt. In total Calzaghe was undefeated in 43 fights and was considered one of the best pound for pound fighters in the World.

Mikkel Kessler was the holder of both the WBC and WBA belts. Originally winning the WBA belt in November 2004 with a victory over Manny Siaca. He defended twice before taking on WBC champion Marcus Beyer in a unification bout in October 2006. He defended both titles in his next fight against Librado Andrade in March 2007. Kessler was considered to be second only to Calzaghe in the super middleweight division.

Talks had been held between the two camps for the fight since October 2006 after Kessler successfully defended against Andrade and Calzaghe had defeated Sakio Bika. Kessler had complained that the Welshman spoke more about facing the likes of Bernard Hopkins and Roy Jones than face his nearest rival in the division. Eventually in July 2007 a fight was agreed for November with Calzaghe's promoter Frank Warren and Mogens Palle representing Kessler coming up with a suitable deal. Speaking of the fight Calzaghe claimed that this was the fight that would mean the most to his career so far even more than the victories over Lacy and Eubank.

The fight was held at the Millennium Stadium in Cardiff in front of 50,000 fans and broadcast on the television networks HBO and Setanta Sports.

== The fights ==
=== Undercard ===
The undercard saw wins for prospects Tony Bellew, Jamie Cox, Ricky Burns and Nathan Cleverly.

=== Maccarinelli vs. Azzaoui ===
The other world title bout on the card saw WBO cruiserweight champion Enzo Maccarinelli face No. 14 ranked Mohamed Azzaoui. He had previously been set to face Ezra Sellers however having only just returning to the ring after a three year absence from the ring the British Boxing Board of Control refused to sanction the bout due to his lack of activity.

Maccarinelli would knockout Azzaoui with a left hook to the body in the 4th round.

Preceded by vs. Wayne Braithwaite	Enzo Maccarinelli's bouts 3 November 2007	Succeeded by vs. David Haye
Preceded by vs. Henry Saenz	Mohamed Azzaoui's bouts 3 November 2007	Succeeded by vs. Yoan Pablo Hernández

=== Main event ===
The first three rounds were closely fought before Kessler had the better of the 4th with two separate right uppercuts winning him the round. The following rounds saw Calzaghe's work rate begin to take control although Kessler seemed to have the advantage in terms of power with a number of shots seeming to rock Calzaghe further. Kessler began to fade in the latter rounds as Calzaghe threw flurries to keep the Dane on the back foot.

The fight went the full 12 rounds, one judge scored it 117–111 the other two had it 116–112 all in favour of Calzaghe

According to Compubox at the end of the fight Calzaghe had thrown 1,010 punches against 585 for Kessler although Kessler had the edge on accuracy and the number of power punches which landed.

== Aftermath ==
Speaking of the fight and the number of punches thrown Kessler said afterwards "his punches weren't particularly hard but it was confusing when he hit you 20 times."

In the interview immediately after the fight, Kessler did admit that Calzaghe had hurt him with one particular body shot.

The decision meant that Calzaghe had been able to unify three belts in the division and fully establish himself as the top super middleweight in the World.

The fight with Kessler had been the 21st defence of Calzaghe's WBO title. The achievement meant that the boxer was now in the record books as having made the 4th highest number of world title defenses. Only the likes of Joe Louis (25 defenses), Dariusz Michalczewski (23 defenses) and Ricardo López (23 defenses) had achieved more in men's boxing, albeit the WBO had only just been recognized as a major world title.

Calzaghe was awarded the BBC Sports Personality of the Year Award for his achievements in boxing throughout 2007.

Kessler regrouped by winning back the now vacant WBA title against Dimitri Sartison and defending it once against Danilo Haussler.

== Undercard ==
Confirmed bouts:

Winner	Loser	Weight division/title belt(s) disputed	Result
(United Kingdom) Enzo Maccarinelli	(Algeria) Mohamed Azzaoui	WBO World Cruiserweight title	4th round TKO
(United Kingdom) Nathan Cleverly	(Uganda) Joseph Lubega	Super middleweight (8 rounds)	Points decision
(Denmark) Thomas Povlsen	(United Kingdom) Lee Noble	Middleweight (6 rounds)	Points decision
(Denmark) Anders Hugger	(Zimbabwe) Hastings Rasani	Cruiserweight (6 rounds)	Points decision
(United Kingdom) Ricky Burns	(Syria) Youssef Al Hamidi	Super featherweight (6 rounds)	Points decision
(United Kingdom) Jamie Cox	(United Kingdom) David Kirk	Light middleweight (4 rounds)	Points decision
(United Kingdom) Barrie Jones	(Nigeria) Silence Saheed	Welterweight (4 rounds)	Points decision
(Australia) Kerry Hope	(United Kingdom) Ernie Smith	Super middleweight (4 rounds)	Points decision
(United Kingdom) Tony Bellew	(United Kingdom) Adam Wilcox	Light heavyweight (4 rounds)	3rd round TKO
(United Kingdom) Hari Miles	(United Kingdom) Mark Phillips	Light heavyweight (4 rounds)	Points decision

== Broadcasting ==
Country	Broadcaster
Hungary	Sport 1
Ireland	Setanta Sports
Mexico	Televisa
United Kingdom	Setanta Sports (Live) / BBC (Delayed)
United States	HBO

Preceded by vs. Peter Manfredo Jr.	Joe Calzaghe's bouts 3 November 2007	Succeeded by vs. Bernard Hopkins
Preceded by vs. Librado Andrade	Mikkel Kessler's bouts 3 November 2007	Succeeded by vs. Dimitri Sartison
