= Vernon Forrest =

American boxer (1971–2009)

Personal information
- Nickname: The Viper
- Born: February 12, 1971 Augusta, Georgia, U.S.
- Died: July 25, 2009 (aged 38) Atlanta, Georgia, U.S.
- Height: 6 ft (183 cm)
- Weight: Light welterweight; Welterweight; Light middleweight

Boxing career
- Reach: 72 1/2 in (184 cm)
- Stance: Orthodox

Boxing record
- Total fights: 45
- Wins: 41
- Win by KO: 29
- Losses: 3
- No contests: 1
Medal record
Men's amateur boxing
Representing United States
World Championships
Silver medal – second place	1991 Sydney	Light welterweight

Vernon Forrest (February 12, 1971 – July 25, 2009) was an American professional boxer who competed from 1992 to 2008. He held multiple world championships in two weight classes, including the WBC, IBF, Ring magazine and lineal welterweight between 2002 and 2003, and the WBC super welterweight title twice between 2007 and 2009. In 2002, Forrest was named Fighter of the Year by The Ring and the Boxing Writers Association of America.

In 2009, Forrest was murdered after he was robbed at a gas station in the Mechanicsville neighborhood of Atlanta, Georgia.

== Early years and amateur career ==
A native of Augusta, Georgia, Forrest began boxing at the age of 9. After compiling an impressive 225–16 record as an amateur, he became the 1992 US junior welterweight champion, and won silver at the 1991 World Amateur Boxing Championships, losing in the finals to Kostya Tszyu. Forrest was the first in his family to graduate from high school receiving his diploma from Marquette Senior High School in Marquette, Michigan. Staying in Marquette, Forrest was on scholarship to Northern Michigan University where he majored in business administration through the U.S. Olympic Education Center. Forrest continued to train with the US National Team under head coach Al Mitchell.

He was a member of the 1992 US Olympic Team during the Summer Olympics in Barcelona, Spain. He earned his Olympic position by beating Shane Mosley in the trials. After that fight, Forrest was the gold medal favorite heading into the tournament. He would have to fight Cuban fighter Hector Vinent, a gold medallist, before reaching that goal. However, he was stricken with food poisoning a day before his first round bout and was beaten by Peter Richardson, who he'd previously defeated in a fight at the 1991 World Amateur Boxing Championships en route to winning the silver medal. He returned home to Augusta, then moved to Las Vegas, and made his professional debut on November 25, 1992.

== Professional career ==
In his professional debut in November 1992, Forrest defeated Charles Hawkins. Through 1996, Forrest stopped 13 out of 15 opponents. Five were stopped in the first round.

=== Welterweight ===
As the years went by Forrest won a few minor title belts. In the year 2000 Forrest finally got his chance to fight for a major title belt against Raul Frank (for the IBF welterweight title). Unfortunately for Forrest however, a cut caused by an accidental head butt ended the bout in round three and the fight was ruled a no contest.

==== IBF welterweight champion ====
Forrest met Frank again in a rematch at Madison Square Garden on May 12, 2001, on a Félix Trinidad undercard. Forrest dominated his opponent and won the fight by a unanimous decision to claim his first major professional boxing title.

==== Forrest vs Mosley I ====
In 2001, Forrest fought the WBC and lineal welterweight champion, Shane Mosley. Many considered Mosley to be the best fighter in the world, and he was the betting favorite to win the fight. Despite being the favorite, Mosley was dominated in this bout. Both fighters initially started strong, landing hard blows, but in the second round Forrest had Mosley hurt early and knocked him down for the first time in his career. A series of strong punches would put him down yet again later in the round. With his dominant performance, Forrest was also awarded the Ring Magazine welterweight title.

==== Forrest vs Mosley II ====
Six months later, Forrest once again squared off against Mosley in a rematch. Despite a stronger performance from Mosley, Forrest won a clear cut decision, using his jab more effectively and through superior ring generalship. Forrest was now considered by many to be one of the top fighters in the world.

==== Forrest vs. Mayorga I ====
In January 2003, Forrest fought the WBA welterweight champion, Ricardo Mayorga. Mayorga was a mostly unknown fringe contender from Nicaragua and few gave him a chance to win against the significantly bigger and stronger Forrest. Mayorga shocked the world when he easily dominated Forrest, dropping him once in the first round and again in the third round. The referee would call off the fight after the second knockdown, as Forrest was visibly dazed and unable to get his footing.

==== Forrest vs. Mayorga II ====
Forrest would rematch Mayorga six months later, losing again, this time by a majority decision. The bout was close and competitive, with Mayorga mostly chasing Forrest around the ring while Forrest was content to fight from the outside.

=== Light middleweight ===
==== Comeback trail ====
Forrest took two years off from fighting because of injuries; Forrest had complete reconstructive surgery on his left arm. He had three surgeries two on his shoulder to repair a torn rotator cuff and one on his left elbow to repair torn cartilage and nerve damages.

In his first fight since losing twice to Mayorga, Forrest knocked out Sergio Rios in two rounds. After the fight against Rios, Forrest stopped Elco Garcia in the tenth round.

Forrest won a controversial ten round unanimous decision over Ike Quartey on August 5, 2006, at Madison Square Theatre, New York City. The judges at ringside scored the fight, 95–94, 95–94, and 96–93.

==== WBC Light middleweight champion ====
On July 28, 2007, Forrest won a unanimous decision against Carlos Baldomir in Tacoma, Washington, frequently firing off heavy right blows at Baldomir. After twelve rounds, Forrest won a lopsided 118–109, 116–111, 118–109 decision to take the vacant WBC light middleweight title.

On December 1, 2007, at Foxwoods Resort Casino, he successfully defended his light middleweight title against Italian Michele Piccirillo, scoring an eleventh-round TKO.

==== Forrest vs. Mora ====
On June 7, 2008, Forrest lost his title to The Contender winner Sergio Mora via a 12-round majority decision. In the build-up to the fight, Forrest referred to Mora as "the pretender" and threatened to send him "out on a stretcher". However, Mora succeeded in pulling off the upset victory. The final scores were 114–114, 115–113 and 116–112 in favor of Mora.

==== Reclaiming the title ====
Forrest reclaimed his WBC 154-pound title on September 14, 2008, against Sergio Mora via unanimous decision, the judges scores were 118–109, 117–110, and 119–110.

== Charity work ==
Forrest was involved directly with the creation of the Not for Profit Destiny's Child, a group home that assists people with developmental, emotional, and psychological disabilities and needs. Forrest was also involved directly with helping the clients by organizing Destiny's Child's activities.

== Murder ==
At about 11:00 pm EDT on July 25, 2009, Forrest stopped at a gas station in the Atlanta neighborhood of Mechanicsville. With him was his 11-year-old godson. As the boy went inside the gas station, Forrest went to the back of his car to add air to a low tire. As this occurred, a man robbed him at gunpoint and fled. Forrest, who was armed, went after the man and shots were exchanged. After a short distance, Forrest gave up the chase and began talking to a second man. It was this man that shot Forrest seven to eight times in the back. According to police, the shooter and a second person left the scene in a red Pontiac. Forrest died at the scene and the death was ruled a homicide. Atlanta Police would arrest and later charge 25-year-old Jquante Crews, 20-year-old Demario Ware and 30-year-old Charman Sinkfield for his murder. It is believed that Sinkfield was the shooter, Ware was the robber, and Crews was the driver. Crews and Ware are serving life sentences. (Georgia Department of Corrections). On October 28, 2016, Charman Sinkfield was sentenced to life without parole.

== Professional boxing record ==
45 fights	41 wins	3 losses
By knockout	29	1
By decision	12	2
No contests	1	

No.	Result	Record	Opponent	Type	Round, time	Date	Location	Notes
45	Win	41–3 (1)	Sergio Mora	UD	12	Sep 13, 2008	MGM Grand Garden Arena, Paradise, Nevada, U.S.	Won WBC super welterweight title
44	Loss	40–3 (1)	Sergio Mora	MD	12	Jun 7, 2008	Mohegan Sun Arena, Montville, Connecticut, U.S.	Lost WBC super welterweight title
43	Win	40–2 (1)	Michele Piccirillo	TKO	11 (12), 2:21	Dec 1, 2007	Foxwoods Resort Casino, Ledyard, Connecticut, U.S.	Retained WBC super welterweight title
42	Win	39–2 (1)	Carlos Baldomir	UD	12	Jul 28, 2007	Emerald Queen Casino, Tacoma, Washington, U.S.	Won vacant WBC super welterweight title
41	Win	38–2 (1)	Ike Quartey	UD	10	Aug 5, 2006	Madison Square Garden, New York City, New York, U.S.	
40	Win	37–2 (1)	Elco Garcia	TKO	10 (10), 1:58	Oct 21, 2005	Pechanga Resort & Casino, Temecula, California, U.S.	
39	Win	36–2 (1)	Sergio Rios	TKO	2 (10), 2:43	Jul 16, 2005	MGM Grand Garden Arena, Paradise, Nevada, U.S.	
38	Loss	35–2 (1)	Ricardo Mayorga	MD	12	Jul 12, 2003	The Orleans, Paradise, Nevada, U.S.	For WBA (Super), WBC, and The Ring welterweight titles
37	Loss	35–1 (1)	Ricardo Mayorga	TKO	3 (12), 2:06	Jan 25, 2003	Pechanga Resort & Casino, Temecula, California, U.S.	Lost WBC and The Ring welterweight titles; For WBA (Super) welterweight title
36	Win	35–0 (1)	Shane Mosley	UD	12	Jul 20, 2002	Conseco Fieldhouse, Indianapolis, Indiana, U.S.	Retained WBC and The Ring welterweight titles
35	Win	34–0 (1)	Shane Mosley	UD	12	Jan 26, 2002	The Theater at Madison Square Garden, New York City, New York, U.S.	Won WBC and vacant The Ring welterweight titles
34	Win	33–0 (1)	Edgar Ruiz	KO	4 (10), 2:03	Aug 24, 2001	Mountaineer Casino Racetrack and Resort, Chester, West Virginia, U.S.	
33	Win	32–0 (1)	Raul Frank	UD	12	May 12, 2001	Madison Square Garden, New York City, New York, U.S.	Won vacant IBF welterweight title
32	NC	31–0 (1)	Raul Frank	NC	3 (12), 1:45	Aug 26, 2000	Mandalay Bay Events Center, Paradise, Nevada, U.S.	Vacant IBF welterweight title at stake; NC after Frank was cut from an accidental head clash
31	Win	31–0	Vince Phillips	UD	12	Jan 22, 2000	The Joint, Paradise, Nevada, U.S.	Retained WBC-NABF welterweight title
30	Win	30–0	Santiago Samaniego	TKO	7 (12), 1:21	Aug 27, 1999	Bell Auditorium, Augusta, Georgia, U.S.	Retained WBC-NABF welterweight title
29	Win	29–0	Ed Goins	KO	4 (10), 2:57	Jun 19, 1999	Madison Square Garden, New York City, New York, U.S.	
28	Win	28–0	Steve Martinez	TKO	1 (12), 1:56	Apr 16, 1999	Grand Casino, Tunica, Mississippi, U.S.	Retained WBC-NABF welterweight title
27	Win	27–0	Mark Fernandez	TKO	2 (8), 1:48	Feb 20, 1999	Madison Square Garden, New York City, New York, U.S.	
26	Win	26–0	Ed Griffin	TKO	2 (12), 2:38	Dec 12, 1998	Etess Arena, Atlantic City, New Jersey, U.S.	Retained WBC-NABF welterweight title
25	Win	25–0	Adrian Stone	TKO	11 (12), 1:27	Aug 18, 1998	Grand Casino, Tunica, Mississippi, U.S.	Won vacant WBC-NABF welterweight title
24	Win	24–0	Gilberto Flores	TKO	2	Mar 28, 1998	Boardwalk Hall, Atlantic City, New Jersey, U.S.	
23	Win	23–0	Ray Oliveira	UD	12	Nov 7, 1997	Bally's Las Vegas, Paradise, Nevada, U.S.	Won vacant WBC Continental Americas welterweight title
22	Win	22–0	Jaime Lerma	UD	10	Aug 19, 1997	Convention Center, Austin, Texas, U.S.	
21	Win	21–0	Pedro Saiz	RTD	6 (10), 3:00	May 5, 1997	Broadway by the Bay Theater, Atlantic City, New Jersey, U.S.	
20	Win	20–0	Francisco De Assis	TKO	1 (10)	Apr 5, 1997	Bally's Park Place, Atlantic City, New Jersey, U.S.	
19	Win	19–0	Mike Rios	TKO	1	Jan 24, 1997	Convention Hall, Atlantic City, New Jersey, U.S.	
18	Win	18–0	Chris Slaughter	KO	1 (10)	May 10, 1996	Madison Square Garden, New York City, New York, U.S.	
17	Win	17–0	Isaac Cruz	KO	8 (10), 2:05	Apr 9, 1996	Fantasy Springs Resort Casino, Indio, California, U.S.	
16	Win	16–0	Tony Ortiz	KO	1 (8), 1:29	Feb 22, 1996	Civic Center, Hammond, Indiana, U.S.	
15	Win	15–0	Marlon Thomas	UD	12	Nov 28, 1995	Bell Auditorium, Augusta, Georgia, U.S.	Won vacant IBC light welterweight title
14	Win	14–0	Jesus Mayorga	TKO	1 (10)	Nov 3, 1995	The Aladdin, Paradise, Nevada, U.S.	
13	Win	13–0	Roberto Chala	TKO	3 (6)	Sep 12, 1995	Biloxi, Mississippi, U.S.	
12	Win	12–0	Julian Romero	TKO	2 (10)	Jul 15, 1995	Caesars Tahoe, Stateline, Nevada, U.S.	
11	Win	11–0	Dezi Ford	TKO	4, 1:53	Apr 18, 1995	The Aladdin, Paradise, Nevada, U.S.	
10	Win	10–0	Genaro Andujar	KO	1	Mar 4, 1995	The Roxy, Boston, Massachusetts, U.S.	
9	Win	9–0	Carlos Cartagena	UD	6	Jan 25, 1995	Etess Arena, Atlantic City, New Jersey, U.S.	
8	Win	8–0	Randy Archuleta	KO	1 (6)	Nov 5, 1994	Caesars Tahoe, Stateline, Nevada, U.S.	
7	Win	7–0	Elvesto Mills	UD	6	Feb 5, 1994	The Aladdin, Paradise, Nevada, U.S.	
6	Win	6–0	Lamont Johnson	TKO	1	Dec 18, 1993	Caesars Tahoe, Stateline, Nevada, U.S.	
5	Win	5–0	Eldon Sneeze	TKO	1	Oct 20, 1993	Casino Magic, Bay St. Louis, Mississippi, U.S.	
4	Win	4–0	Theodore Carradine	TKO	3 (6), 2:08	Jul 17, 1993	Caesars Palace, Paradise, Nevada, U.S.	
3	Win	3–0	Augustine Renteria	TKO	2 (6), 1:40	Jun 7, 1993	Thomas & Mack Center, Paradise, Nevada, U.S.	
2	Win	2–0	Ray Garcia	TKO	1 (4), 2:35	Jan 30, 1993	Riviera, Winchester, Nevada, U.S.	
1	Win	1–0	Charles Hawkins	TKO	1 (4), 1:29	Nov 25, 1992	Riviera, Winchester, Nevada, U.S.	

Sporting positions
Amateur boxing titles
Previous: Stevie Johnston	U.S. light welterweight champion 1991	Next: Shane Mosley
Regional boxing titles
Vacant Title last held by Edgar Ruiz	WBC Continental Americas welterweight champion November 7, 1997 – August 1998; Vacated	Vacant Title next held by Jorge Vaca
Vacant Title last held by Derrell Coley	NABF welterweight champion August 18, 1998 – August 2000; Vacated	Vacant Title next held by Danny Perez Ramírez
Minor world boxing titles
Vacant Title last held by Corey Johnson	IBC light welterweight champion November 28, 1995 – February 1996; Vacated	Vacant Title next held by Søren Søndergaard
Major world boxing titles
Vacant Title last held by Félix Trinidad	IBF welterweight champion May 12, 2001 – December 2001; Stripped	Vacant Title next held by Michele Piccirillo
Preceded by Shane Mosley	WBC welterweight champion January 26, 2002 – January 25, 2003	Succeeded by Ricardo Mayorga
Vacant Title last held by Marlon Starling	The Ring welterweight champion January 26, 2002 – January 25, 2003	Succeeded by Ricardo Mayorga
Preceded by Shane Mosley	Lineal welterweight champion January 26, 2002 – January 25, 2003	Succeeded by Ricardo Mayorga
Vacant Title last held by Floyd Mayweather Jr.	WBC super welterweight champion July 28, 2007 – June 7, 2008	Succeeded by Sergio Mora
Preceded by Sergio Mora	WBC super welterweight champion September 14, 2008 – May 21, 2009; Stripped	Succeeded by Sergio Martínez promoted from interim status
Awards
Previous: Bernard Hopkins	The Ring Fighter of the Year; 2002	Next: James Toney
Previous: Bernard Hopkins	BWAA Fighter of the Year; 2002	Next: James Toney
Welterweight status
Previous: Luis Manuel Rodríguez	Latest born world champion to die July 25, 2009 – September 14, 2025	Next: Ricky Hatton
Light middleweight status
Previous: Duane Thomas	Latest born world champion to die July 25, 2009 – present	Incumbent
