= Charles Kizza =

Ugandan boxer

Personal information
- Full name: Charles Bakule Kizza
- Nationality: Ugandan
- Born: 18 January 1974 (age 52)

Sport
- Sport: Boxing
Medal record
Men's amateur boxing
Representing Uganda
Commonwealth Games
Bronze medal – third place	1994 Victoria	Heavyweight

Charles Bakule Kizza (born 18 January 1974), known as Charles Kizza, is a Ugandan boxer. He competed in the men's heavyweight event at the 1996 Summer Olympics.
