= Fred Mutuweta =

Ugandan boxer (born 1971)

Fred Muteweta
Personal information
- Full name: Fredrick Muteweta
- Born: 4 November 1971 (age 54) Kampala, Uganda
- Height: 167 cm (5 ft 6 in)
- Weight: 106 lb (48 kg)

Sport
- Sport: Boxing
- Weight class: Bantamweight
Medal record
Men's amateur boxing
Representing Uganda
All-Africa Games
Gold medal – first place	1991 Cairo	Bantamweight
Commonwealth Games
Bronze medal – third place	1994 Victoria	Bantamweight

Fredrick Muteweta (born 4 November 1971) is a Ugandan retired boxer who participated at the 1988 Summer Olympics in Seoul, South Korea in the light-flyweight class. There he was defeated in the second round by Wayne McCullough of Ireland. In the bantamweight class at the 1992 Summer Olympics, he was once again defeated in his opening bout, once again by Wayne McCullough.

He also represented Uganda at the 1991 All-Africa Games, winning a gold medal as a bantamweight and at the 1994 Commonwealth Games, winning a bronze medal in the bantamweight category.

Muteweta made his professional debut in 1996, and retired after ten professional bouts, losing five and winning five.
