= Seychelles at the 1994 Commonwealth Games =

Seychelles at the 1990 Commonwealth Games
- CGF code: SEY
- CGA: Seychelles Olympic and Commonwealth Games Association
- Medals: Gold 0 Silver 0 Bronze 1 Total 1

Commonwealth Games appearances (overview)
- 1990; 1994; 1998; 2002; 2006; 2010; 2014; 2018; 2022; 2026; 2030

Seychelles at the 1994 Commonwealth Games was abbreviated SEY.

== Medals ==
	Gold	Silver	Bronze	Total
Seychelles	0	0	1	1

=== Gold ===
- none

=== Silver ===
- none

=== Bronze ===
- Rival Cadeau — Boxing, Men's Light Middleweight, 71kg
