= Casey Patton =

Canadian boxer

Personal information
- Born: November 21, 1974 (age 51) London, Ontario, Canada

Sport
- Sport: Boxing
Medal record
Men's amateur boxing
Representing Canada
Commonwealth Games
Gold medal – first place	1994 Victoria	Featherweight

Casey Patton (born November 21, 1974, in London, Ontario) is a retired boxer from Canada. He is a five-time Canadian champion who competed in the featherweight (< 57 kg) division at the 1996 Summer Olympics in Atlanta, Georgia. There he was defeated in the first round by South Africa's Phillip N'dou in a controversial referee stoppage.

Patton won the gold medal in the 1994 Commonwealth Games in Victoria, British Columbia and was the 1994 Canadian Amateur Boxer of the year. In 2008, Patton was inducted into the London (Ontario) Sports Hall of Fame.
