= Ghana at the 1994 Commonwealth Games =

Sporting event delegation

Flag of Ghana

Ghana at the 1994 Commonwealth Games was abbreviated GHA. IT won 2 bronze medals at the games.

== Medals ==
	Gold	Silver	Bronze	Total
Ghana	0	0	2	2

=== Gold ===
- none

=== Silver ===
- none

=== Bronze ===
- Tijani Moro — Boxing, Men's Light Welterweight.
