= Bob Gasio =

Samoan boxer (born 1966)

- Born: Lupematasila Bob Gasio; February 7, 1966 (age 60); Samoa
- Nationality: New Zealander; Samoa
- Weight: 109.1 kg (241 lb; 17 st 3 lb)
- Division: Heavyweight
- Style: Boxing
- Years active: 2002 - 2012

Professional boxing record
- Total: 29
- Wins: 11
- By knockout: 3
- Losses: 18
- By knockout: 11
- Draws: 0

Other information
- Boxing record from BoxRec

Lupematasila Bob Gasio (born February 8, 1966), known as Bob Gasio, is a boxer from Samoa. He competed in the 1994 Commonwealth Games where he won a silver medal for boxing in the Men's Light-Middleweight class. He competed in the 1996 Summer Olympics in the Men's Middleweight class.

== Professional boxing record ==
29 fights	11 wins	18 losses
By knockout	3	11
By decision	8	7
Draws	0	

No.	Result	Record	Opponent	Type	Round, time	Date	Location	Notes
29	Lose	11–18	(New Zealand) Elisara Sii Uta	SD	4	23 Mar 2012	ABA Stadium, Auckland, New Zealand	
28	Lose	11–17	(Australia) Ben Wrotniak	TKO	2 (6) 1:45	4 Feb 2011	Croatian Club, Punchbowl, New South Wales, Australia	
27	Lose	11–16	(Australia) Bob Mirovic	TKO	2 (6) 2:59	19 Nov 2010	Revesby Workers Club, Revesby, New South Wales, Australia	
26	Lose	11–15	(Australia) Adam Forsyth	KO	1 (6) 2:38	22 Jul 2010	Assyrian Sports & Culture Club, Fairfield Heights, New South Wales, Australia	
25	Lose	11–14	(Australia) Scott Lewis	UD	4	1 Jul 2010	Panthers Rugby League Club, Penrith, New South Wales, Australia	
24	Lose	11–13	(New Zealand) Soulan Pownceby	RTD	3 (10) 3:00	17 Aug 2009	ABA Stadium, Auckland, New Zealand	
23	Lose	11–12	(Australia) Dominic Vea	RTD	3 (12) 3:00	21 Nov 2008	Blacktown RSL Club, Blacktown, Sydney, New South Wales, Australia	OPBF cruiserweight title
22	Win	11–11	(New Zealand) Daniel Tai	UD	4	8 Nov 2008	ASB Stadium, Kohimarama, New Zealand	
21	Win	10–11	(Tonga) Etisoni Vae	KO	2 (4)	2 Jun 2008	Leisure Centre, Otara, New Zealand	
20	Win	9–11	(Fiji) Sakeasi Dakua	KO	6 (12)	13 May 2008	Leisure Centre, Otara, New Zealand	South Pacific Cruiserweight Title
19	Win	8–11	(Tonga) Sinela Fifita	TD	4 (6)	28 Mar 2008	Manurewa Netball Centre, Manurewa, New Zealand	Fight abandoned end of round 4 due to wild brawl amongst spectators
18	Win	7–11	(Tonga) Walter Pupu'a	UD	12	2 Feb 2008	Faleata Sports Complex Gym 1, Apia, Samoa	South Pacific cruiserweight title
17	Win	6–11	(Fiji) Oscar Talemaira	UD	6	29 Nov 2007	ABA Stadium, Auckland, New Zealand	
16	Win	5–11	(New Zealand) Neil Nili Ta'ala	KO	1 (6)	20 Nov 2007	Leisure Centre, Otara, New Zealand	
15	Win	4–11	(New Zealand) Terry Tuteru	UD	4	26 Mar 2006	Ellerslie Racecourse, Auckland, New Zealand	
14	Lose	3–11	(New Zealand) Frank Atu	PTS	8	19 Nov 2005	O'Hagen Bar & Restaurant, Pakuranga, New Zealand	
13	Lose	3–10	(Australia) James Grima	KO	2 (6) 0:57	29 Jul 2005	Knox Netball Centre, Ferntree Gully, Victoria, Australia	
12	Lose	3–9	(United States) Chauncy Welliver	UD	4	11 Dec 2004	ETA Stadium, Auckland, New Zealand	
11	Lose	3–8	(Australia) Colin Wilson	KO	1 (10) 1:31	28 Nov 2003	Basketball Stadium, Emerald, Queensland, Australia	
10	Lose	3–7	(Australia) Colin Wilson	KO	4 (10)	28 Nov 2003	Southport RSL Club, Southport, Queensland, Australia	South Pacific Heavyweight Title
9	Lose	3–6	(Australia) Mitch O'Hello	KO	5 (8)	17 Oct 2003	Southport Sharks AFL Club, Southport, Queensland, Australia	
8	Lose	3–5	(Algeria) Mohamed Azzaoui	UD	6	21 Jun 2003	Alexandra Park Raceway, Auckland, New Zealand	
7	Win	3–4	(New Zealand) Shane Wijohn	PTS	6	24 Apr 2003	ABA Stadium, Kohimarama, New Zealand	
6	Lose	2–4	(Algeria) Mohamed Azzaoui	KO	3 (12)	22 Feb 2003	Northland College Hall, Kaikohe, New Zealand	vacant New Zealand Boxing Association cruiserweight title
5	Lose	2–3	(New Zealand) Paula Mataele	TKO	3 (6)	19 Dec 2002	ABA Stadium, Auckland, New Zealand	
4	Win	2–2	(Niue) Pua Ahotolu	PTS	4	7 Dec 2002	YMCA Stadium, Auckland, New Zealand	
3	Lose	1–2	(New Zealand) Richard Tutaki	PTS	3	7 Sep 2002	YMCA Stadium, Auckland, New Zealand	(Quarter-final of Heavyweight Competition)
2	Lose	1–1	(Australia) Simon Paterson	PTS	6	17 May 2002	Dallas Brooks Hall, East Melbourne, Victoria, Australia	
1	Win	1–0	(New Zealand) Joe Chanboon Tanuvasa	PTS	6	9 Mar 2002	Pakuranga O'Hagens Bar, Auckland, New Zealand	Professional debut
