= Trinidad and Tobago at the 1994 Commonwealth Games =

Sporting event delegation

Flag of Trinidad and Tobago

The Official Logo of the Trinidad and Tobago Commonwealth Games Association

Trinidad and Tobago at the 1994 Commonwealth Games was abbreviated TRI.

== Medals ==
	Gold	Silver	Bronze	Total
Trinidad and Tobago	0	0	2	2

=== Gold ===
- none

=== Silver ===
- none

=== Bronze ===
- Patrick Delice, Neil de Silva, H. Stephens, Ian Morris — Athletics, Men's 4 x 400 Metres Relay
- Mike Penniston-John — Boxing, Men's Middleweight
