= David Anyim =

Kenyan boxer (1965–2007)

Personal information
- Full name: David Miriambo Anyim
- Nationality: Kenyan
- Born: 6 February 1965
- Died: 24 September 2007 (aged 42)

Sport
- Sport: Boxing
Medal record
Men's amateur boxing
Representing Kenya
Commonwealth Games
Silver medal – second place	1994 Victoria	Super heavyweight
All-Africa Games
Bronze medal – third place	1991 Cairo	Super heavyweight

David Miriambo Anyim (6 February 1965 – 24 September 2007) was a Kenyan boxer. He competed in the men's super heavyweight event at the 1992 Summer Olympics.
