= Trevor Shailer =

New Zealand professional boxer

Personal information
- Born: 31 December 1970 (age 55) Levin, New Zealand

Sport
- Sport: Boxing
Medal record
Men's amateur boxing
Representing New Zealand
Commonwealth Games
Bronze medal – third place	1994 Victoria	Light welterweight

Trevor Shailer (born 31 December 1970 in Levin) is a former boxer from New Zealand, who won a bronze medal at the 1994 Commonwealth Games in Victoria, Canada in the light welterweight class. He also placed seventeenth in the same event at the 1992 Summer Olympics in Barcelona, Spain.

Shailer is the Chief Executive of Sport Manawatū, and has also been employed with the Health Sponsorship Council, and served on the New Zealand Olympic Committee Maori Advisory Group, particularly in preparation for the 2004 Summer Olympics.
