= Tommy Waite =

Irish boxer

Personal information
- Nickname: Willo the Wisp
- Nationality: British
- Born: Thomas Waite; 11 March 1972 (age 54) Belfast, Northern Ireland, U.K.
- Height: 5 ft 5 in (1.65 m)
- Weight: Bantamweight

Boxing career
- Reach: 64 in (163 cm)
- Stance: Orthodox

Boxing record
- Total fights: 15
- Wins: 11
- Win by KO: 4
- Losses: 4

Thomas Waite (born 11 March 1972) is a Northern Irish former professional boxer who competed from 1996 to 2001. He held the BUI Ireland National title in 1997 and the British and Commonwealth bantamweight titles in 2000.
