= Adrian Stone (boxer) =

English boxer, born 1971

Personal information
- Nickname: The Predator
- Nationality: English
- Born: 19 July 1971 (age 55) England
- Height: 5 ft 7 in (170 cm)
- Weight: welter, light middle

Boxing career
- Reach: 71 in (180 cm)
- Stance: Orthodox

Boxing record
- Total fights: 40
- Wins: 33 (KO 23)
- Losses: 5 (KO 4)
- Draws: 2

Adrian Stone (born July 19, 1971, in Bristol) is an English professional boxer who competed from 1993 to 2003. He won the vacant IBO world light middleweight title in April 2000 against Olympic gold medalist Michael Carruth, and fought unsuccessfully the likes of Vernon Forrest for vacant NABF welter title, Shane Mosley for WBC world welter title, and Sergio Martínez for aforementioned IBO world light middleweight title.
