= Le Café des Rêves =

Le Café des Rêves, filmed on location in Lille, France, is a French language educational mini-series. It was first broadcast in 1992. The series, which is made up of five 20 minute episodes, was made by the BBC for British secondary school students, aged between 13 and 15, learning French.

== Plot ==
The plot follows five young people named Serge, Marco, Nathalie, Isabelle, and Djamal as they redecorate and run a cafe. Originally named "Café des Abattoirs," which means Slaughterhouse Café, the teenagers rename it "Café des Rêves," meaning "Café of Dreams." The main character is Serge, a fifteen-year-old boy. His dad goes to Africa to work as a chef, so he stays at his parents' café under the tutelage of his grandmother. His friends are Nathalie, Isabelle, Djamal, and Marco. Nathalie has a crush on Serge but doesn't admit it. Marco loves to rap and wants to be a rapper, which isn't surprising due to his incredible rapping skills that he demonstrates on numerous occasions throughout the show. Isabelle and Djamal are dating. Isabelle's mother doesn't like Djamal because he is Arab and doesn't want Isabelle seeing him. Djamal has an older brother, Karim, who is having some problems with debt. Karim borrowed money from two guys, Gérard and Bertrand, who want their money back. A young Englishman called Wayne (played by Jake Wood) soon shows up, homeless and seemingly on the hunt for things to steal. Mme Lambin, Serge's grandmother, goes out on the town but is viciously attacked by a mystery person who drives off in a sports car. Mme Lambin is in a coma and is rushed to the hospital.

Marco throws his rap concert. Everyone enjoyed it.

But the plot thickens. The police find out that Serge is living by himself and attempt to put him in an orphanage. Just before they enter the building, however, Mme Lambin's friends and Isabelle's mother show up with papers informing the police of Serge's situation, namely that Serge will be under the guardianship of Dédé and Jeannot (his grandmother's friends) – his father is in Africa, his grandmother in the hospital. Isabelle's mother admits that she called the police in the first place as she was bitter about Isabelle and Djamal. She appears to fully regret her actions. As Serge leaves, a mysterious boy stares down at him from a high window, his hands pressed against the glass. The police officer (Officer Briand) lets Serge go, as he saw Serge was under a guardian.

Serge goes to visit his grandmother in the hospital, and she calls Serge's name, waking from her coma.

Karim's plotline resolves itself as well. He confesses to Serge that it was he who stole Mme Lambin's purse, and that while trying to defend herself, she hit her head. Serge is speechless. Angry, he later tells Gérard and Bertrand where Karim is. Immediately after doing this, however, Serge laments his actions and runs back to the café for backup before racing on his bike to warn Karim. Karim and his pursuers partake in an elaborate chase which ends with Karim hanging precariously from the roof of an old mine building where he had been hiding, unable to pull himself up. Serge's backup (Marco, Nathalie, Isabelle, and Djamal) arrives, forcing Gérard and Bertrand to abandon Karim, telling him he has two days to get them the money. Serge rescues Karim to the admiration of his friends, particularly Nathalie, who professes her love for Serge, which is enthusiastically reciprocated.

Back at the café, everyone celebrates Mme Lambin's recovery. Karim has decided to sell his Porsche to pay back his debts. Wayne's true love, Angelique, had come to France to find and meet Wayne; she shows up as well, and they have a happy reunion.
