= Irvin Buhlalu =

South African boxer (born 1974)

Personal information
- Nationality: South African
- Born: 21 November 1974 (age 51) Durban, South Africa

Sport
- Sport: Boxing
- Club: Chesterville Boxing Club
- Coached by: Mzimasi Mnguni

Irvin Buhlalu (born 21 November 1974) is a South African boxer. He competed in the men's lightweight event at the 1996 Summer Olympics.

== Professional boxing record ==
27 Wins (16 knockouts, 11 decisions), 9 Losses (6 knockouts, 3 decision), 1 Draws
Result	Record	Opponent	Type	Rounds	Date	Location	Notes
Loss	27–9	(Democratic Republic of the Congo) Paul Kamanga	KO	1 (8)	22 March 2014	Orlando Community Hall, Soweto, Gauteng, South Africa	
Loss	27–8	(South Africa) Thompson Mokwana	TKO	7 (12)	13 December 2013	Mdantsane Indoor Centre, Mdantsane, East London, Eastern Cape, South Africa	
Win	27-7	(South Africa) Anelisa Gungqisa	TKO	4 (8)	22 September 2013	Orient Theatre, East London, Eastern Cape, South Africa	
Win	26-7	(South Africa) Thulani Mbatha	TKO	3 (0)	22 September 2012	Docklanda Hotel, South Beach, Durban, KwaZulu-Natal, South Africa	
Win	25-7	(South Africa) Lungisa Jikani	TKO	5 (6)	28 October 2011	Lions Den, Pinetown, KwaZulu-Natal, South Africa	
Loss	24–7	(South Africa) Vusumzi Bokolo	UD	6 (6)	2 August 2009	Orient Theatre, East London, Eastern Cape, South Africa	
Win	24-6	(South Africa) Skhumbuzo Khoso	PTS	10 (10)	29 November 2008	Umlazi, Durban, KwaZulu-Natal, South Africa	
Loss	23–6	(South Africa) Amon Baloyi	KO	4 (12)	4 May 2008	Orient Theatre, East London, Eastern Cape, South Africa	
Win	23-5	(South Africa) Benedict Dlamini	SD	12 (12)	28 September 2007	Orient Theatre, East London, Eastern Cape, South Africa	
Win	22-5	(South Africa) Khululekile Sibeko	MD	12 (12)	3 June 2007	Orient Theatre, East London, Eastern Cape, South Africa	
Win	21-5	(South Africa) Benedict Dlamini	SD	12 (12)	11 November 2006	Victoria Mxenge Hall, Durban, KwaZulu-Natal, South Africa	
Win	20-5	(South Africa) Simphiwe Joni	TKO	11 (12)	15 September 2006	Victoria Mxenge Hall, Durban, KwaZulu-Natal, South Africa	
Win	19-5	(South Africa) Benedict Dlamini	UD	12 (12)	5 May 2006	Gugu Dlamini Park, Durban, KwaZulu-Natal, South Africa	
Win	18-5	(South Africa) Siviwe Ntshingana	UD	12 (12)	18 November 2005	Gugu Dlamini Park, Durban, KwaZulu-Natal, South Africa	
Win	17-5	(South Africa) Sikhulule Sidzumo	SD	12 (12)	15 July 2005	Centenary Hall, New Brighton, Port Elizabeth, Eastern Cape, South Africa	
Win	16–5	(South Africa) Ncedisile Kafile	PTS	6 (6)	23 October 2004	Orient Theatre, East London, Eastern Cape, South Africa	
Loss	15–5	(South Africa) Isaac Hlatshwayo	KO	6 (12)	19 December 2003	Wembley Indoor Arena, Johannesburg, Gauteng, South Africa	
Win	15–4	(South Africa) Mzukisi Mgidi	PTS	8 (8)	2 August 2003	Orient Theatre, East London, Eastern Cape, South Africa	
Win	14–4	(South Africa) Nasele Mkhatshane	KO	1 (0)	14 December 2002	Mdantsane Indoor Centre, Mdantsane, East London, Eastern Cape, South Africa	
Loss	13–4	(South Africa) Martin Jacobs	TKO	9 (12)	6 July 2002	Centenary Hall, New Brighton, Port Elizabeth, Eastern Cape, South Africa	
Win	13–3	(South Africa) Nkosinathi Moholo	KO	6 (6)	2 February 2002	Orient Theatre, East London, Eastern Cape, South Africa	
Win	12–3	(South Africa) Melikhaya August	KO	1 (12)	21 July 2001	Mdantsane Indoor Centre, Mdantsane, East London, Eastern Cape, South Africa	
Win	11–3	(South Africa) Bheki Lubisi	TKO	2 (6)	9 May 2001	Carnival City, Brakpan, Gauteng, South Africa	
Win	10–3	(Democratic Republic of the Congo) Nkosinathi Mthimkulu	KO	1 (6)	25 February 2001	Mdantsane Indoor Centre, Mdantsane, East London, Eastern Cape, South Africa	
Loss	9–3	(South Africa) Mzonke Fana	UD	12 (12)	6 August 2000	Oliver Thambo Hall, Khayelitsha, Cape Town, Western Cape, South Africa	
Loss	9–2	(South Africa) Mzonke Fana	UD	12 (12)	6 February 2000	Oliver Thambo Hall, Khayelitsha, Cape Town, Western Cape, South Africa	
Win	9–1	(South Africa) Mabuti Sahluko	KO	2 (6)	30 May 1999	Orient Theatre, East London, Eastern Cape, South Africa	
Win	8–1	(South Africa) Danile Botman	PTS	4 (4)	20 April 1999	Carousel Casino, Hammanskraal, Gauteng, South Africa	
Win	7–1	(South Africa) Jacob Mkwanazi	TKO	2 (6)	29 September 1998	Carousel Casino, Hammanskraal, Gauteng, South Africa	
Win	6–1	(South Africa) Edward Dlamini	PTS	6 (6)	28 July 1998	Carousel Casino, Hammanskraal, Gauteng, South Africa	
Draw	5–1	(South Africa) Matthews Zulu	PTS	6 (6)	30 June 1998	Carousel Casino, Hammanskraal, Gauteng, South Africa	
Loss	5–1	(South Africa) George Mbatha	TKO	6 (6)	7 December 1997	Fred Crookes Technikon Hall, Durban, KwaZulu-Natal, South Africa	
Win	5–0	(South Africa) Phapama Danisa	TKO	4 (6)	8 November 1997	Village Green, Durban, KwaZulu-Natal, South Africa	
Win	4–0	(South Africa) Vincent Mafatshe	KO	1 (-)	21 September 1997	Sanlam Centre, Pinetown, KwaZulu-Natal, South Africa	
Win	3–0	(South Africa) Nyaniso Mtati	TKO	1 (-)	24 August 1997	Town Hall, Estcourt, KwaZulu-Natal, South Africa	
Win	2–0	(South Africa) Sithembiso Jili	KO	1 (6)	15 June 1997	Rossburgh High School Hall, Durban, KwaZulu-Natal, South Africa	
Win	1–0	(South Africa) Stanley Zondi	TKO	2 (-)	1 June 1997	Rossburgh High School Hall, Durban, KwaZulu-Natal, South Africa	
