= José Celaya =

American boxer (born 1981)

Personal information
- Nickname: Cuate
- Born: José Antonio Celaya; November 3, 1981 (age 44) Salinas, California
- Height: 6 ft 0 in (183 cm)
- Weight: Middleweight; Light Middleweight; Welterweight

Boxing career
- Reach: 74 in (189 cm)
- Stance: Orthodox

Boxing record
- Total fights: 38
- Wins: 31
- Win by KO: 16
- Losses: 7
- Draws: 0
- No contests: 0

José Antonio Celaya (born November 3, 1981, in Salinas, California) was an American professional boxer in the Middleweight division and is the former WBO NABO Welterweight Champion.

== Professional career ==
On February 9, 2008, Celaya lost to the title contender Mexican Julio César Chávez, Jr. at the Domo De La Feria in León, Guanajuato, Mexico.
