= Bernard Paul (boxer) =

Mauritian/British boxer (born 1965)

Personal information
- Nickname: Punching Postman
- Nationality: Mauritian/British
- Born: Bernard Paul; 22 October 1965 (age 60) Port Louis, Mauritius
- Height: 5 ft 7 in (1.70 m)
- Weight: light welter/welter/light middleweight

Boxing career
- Stance: Orthodox

Boxing record
- Total fights: 35
- Wins: 21(KO 10)
- Losses: 10 (KO 5)
- Draws: 4

Bernard "Punching Postman" Paul (born October 22, 1965) is a Mauritian/British professional light welter/welter/light middleweight boxer of the 1990s and 2000s who won the British Boxing Board of Control (BBBofC) Southern (England) Area light welterweight title, and Commonwealth light welterweight title, and was a challenger for the World Boxing Organization (WBO) Inter-Continental light welterweight title against Jon Thaxton, British Boxing Board of Control (BBBofC) British light welterweight title against Mark Winters, and World Boxing Organization (WBO) Inter-Continental light welterweight title against Ricky Hatton, his professional fighting weight varied from 138 lb (63 kg; 9 st 12 lb), i.e. light welterweight to 149 1/4 lb (67.7 kg; 10 st 9.3 lb), i.e. light middleweight.
