= Daniel Attah =

Nigerian boxer (born 1978)

Personal information
- Nationality: Nigerian
- Born: 20 November 1978 (age 47) Calabar, Nigeria

Sport
- Sport: Boxing

Daniel Attah (born 20 November 1978) is a Nigerian former professional boxer who challenged for the WBA (Super) and WBO super featherweight titles in 2002. As an amateur, he competed in the men's featherweight event at the 1996 Summer Olympics.

Attah lost to Acelino Freitas in 12 rounds, by a unanimous decision in a world championship fight held at Phoenix, Arizona. As of 2022, he is a resident of Washington, D.C.
