= Harold Lederman =

American boxing judge and analyst (1940–2019)

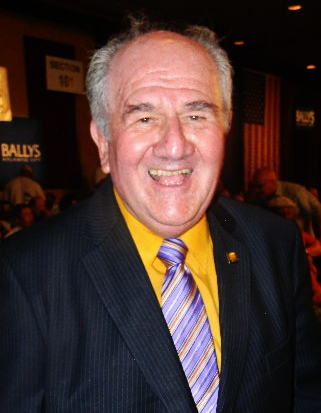
Lederman in September 2010

Harold Lederman (January 26, 1940 – May 11, 2019) was an American boxing judge and analyst. He began his career as a boxing judge in 1967 and joined the cast of HBO World Championship Boxing in 1986, and was there until HBO dropped boxing in 2018. Lederman was inducted into the International Boxing Hall of Fame in the class of 2016. Lederman died on May 11, 2019, at 79 years of age, from cancer.

== Education and career ==
Lederman attended Columbia University and upon graduation earned a license from New York's State Athletic Commission to judge title fights on June 26, 1967. He judged (by his count) over a hundred title fights in every corner of the globe, all the while maintaining his pharmacy practice in New York. In 1986, HBO executive producer Ross Greenburg invited Lederman to join HBO's boxing show World Championship Boxing as an "expert commentator".

Lederman retired from active judging in 1999 but remained with the HBO show as "unofficial ringside scorer." His voice could be heard when official HBO commentator Jim Lampley introduced him with the line, "...and now the rules with our unofficial ringside scorer, Harold Lederman," after which he read the rules of the fight (often beginning by saying "Ok, Jim...") and occasionally the rules for scoring fights to the audience and cut back to Lampley. During the fight, after the 3rd, 6th and 9th rounds and immediately after the fight, while waiting for the official scores, Lampley would have Lederman tell the fans what his unofficial card looked like, often calling it the Lederman card. HBO also ran a graphic at the beginning of each round with his preceding round's score.

== Family life ==
Lederman was married with two daughters and lived in Orangeburg, New York. His daughter, Julie Lederman, followed her father into the business as a ring side judge. When not commentating, Lederman could be frequently found in interviews from the boxing press.

== Appearances ==
In 2012, Lederman served as Master of Ceremonies for the Ring 10 Veterans Boxing Foundation 2nd Annual Fundraiser.

== Awards and honors ==
- 2016: International Boxing Hall of Fame
- 1997: inducted into the World Boxing Hall of Fame
- Inductee, Rockland County, New York Sports HOF
- Marvin Goldberg Award, Bna'i Br'ith Max Kase Sports Lodge (outstanding contribution to boxing)
- 2006: "Good Guy Award", Boxing Writers Association of America
