= 1994 Commonwealth Games =

Multi-sport event held in Canada

XV Commonwealth Games
- Logo of 1994 Commonwealth Games
- Host city: Victoria, Canada
- Motto: Catch The Spirit
- Nations: 63
- Athletes: 2,557
- Events: 217 events in 10 sports
- Opening: 18 August 1994
- Closing: 28 August 1994
- Opened by: Elizabeth II
- Closed by: Prince Edward
- Queen's Baton Final Runner: Myriam Bédard
- Main venue: Centennial Stadium

The 1994 Commonwealth Games (French: XV^{éme} Jeux du Commonwealth) were held in Victoria, British Columbia, Canada, between 18 and 28 August 1994. It was the 15th Commonwealth Games. These were the fourth and most recent Commonwealth Games to be hosted by Canada, after Hamilton 1930, Vancouver 1954, and Edmonton 1978.

The Games featured ten sports: athletics, aquatics (diving and swimming), badminton, boxing, cycling, gymnastics, lawn bowls, shooting, weightlifting and wrestling. Judo which had replaced wrestling in 1990 was dropped in favour of wrestling returning, the latter being dropped from the Games for the first time in 1990.

== Host selection ==
Three bids for the 1994 Commonwealth Games were submitted. Victoria, New Delhi, and Cardiff were the bidding cities. On 15 September 1988, the Commonwealth Games Federation voted to award Victoria the 1994 Commonwealth Games.

1994 Commonwealth Games bidding results
City	Country	Votes
Victoria	Canada	29
New Delhi	India	18
Cardiff	Wales	7

== Venues ==
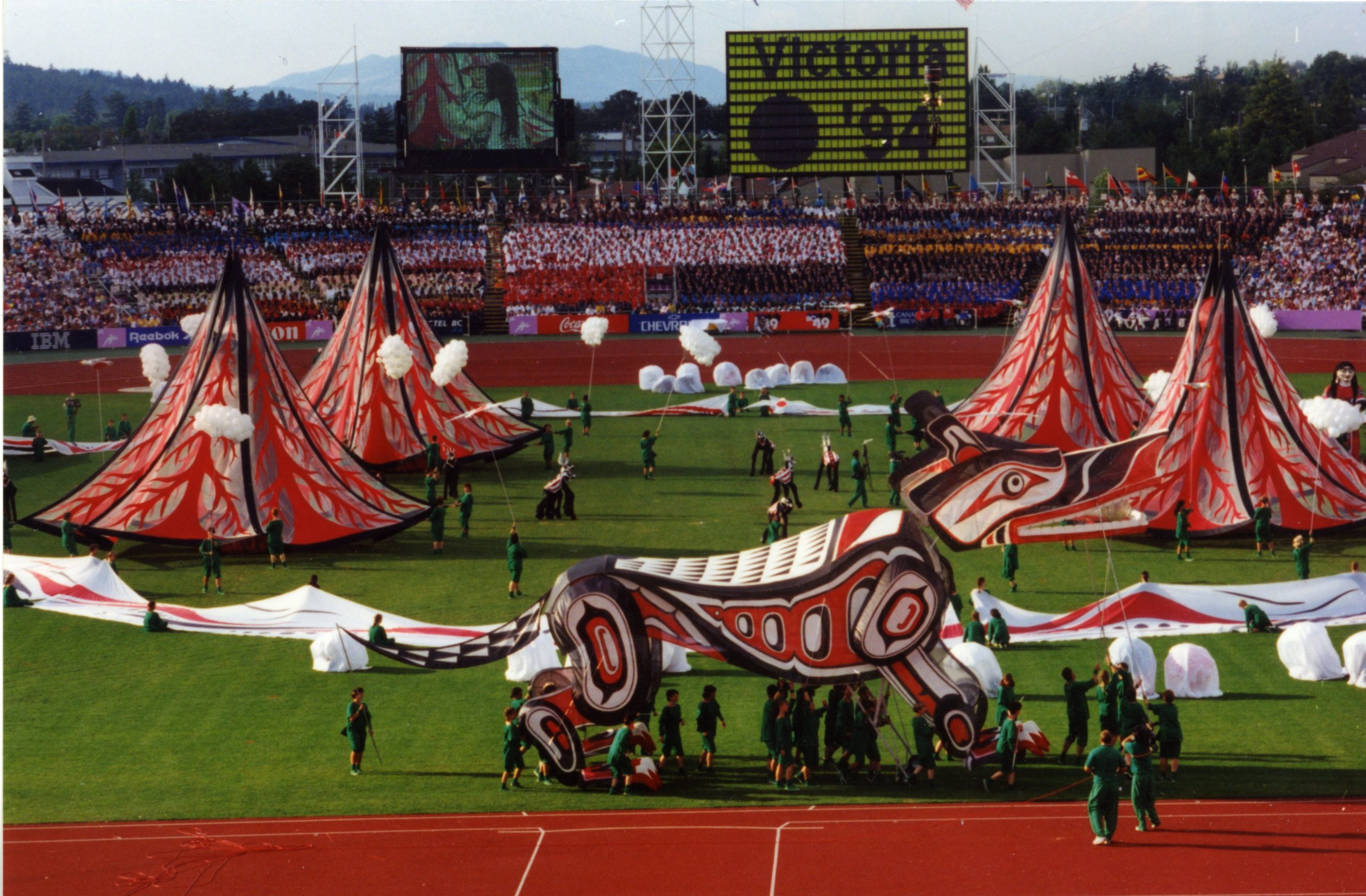
The opening ceremony

Many of the venues were existing, with the Saanich Commonwealth Place being built for $22 million CAD being the biggest cost for a new building. Other new venues included four new lawn bowl courts and the velodrome.

- University of Victoria – Athletes' Village
- Centennial Stadium – Athletics
- Saanich Commonwealth Place – Aquatics
- McKinnon Gymnasium – Badminton
- Archie Browning Sports Centre (Esquimalt) – Boxing
- Victoria Memorial Arena – Gymnastics
- Royal Athletic Park – Field Lacrosse (demonstration)
- Heal's Range – Shooting
- Royal Theatre – Weightlifting
- Juan de Fuca Recreation Centre
  - Juan de Fuca Velodrome – Track cycling
  - Juan de Fuca Bowling Club – Lawn bowls
  - Juan de Fuca Arena – Wrestling
- Highway 17 (Patricia Bay Highway) – Road cycling

== Final "Original Games" ==
The 1994 games was the last time team sports were excluded. In 1991, the Commonwealth Games Federation deemed the original setup of ten sports to be obsolete. Beginning with the 1998 games, team sports such as Rugby sevens, Basketball, and Field hockey were added. The decision was taken to encourage more revenue streams from television by making the games more attractive to viewing audiences.

== Opening ceremony ==
The opening ceremony featured production design by Mary Kerr in collaboration with Chief Adam Dick, Clan Chief Kwaxistella of the Kwaxkwaka'wakw (then known as the Kwakiutl), and Kim Recalma Clutesi. A simple friendly atmosphere was the theme to the Opening Ceremonies. In the presence of Prince Edward, the Athletes had a long march past to their seated area (an idea created four years previously and emulated since at the 2014 Games in Glasgow). Welcome speeches and flag raisings were followed by a precision horse riding display by the Royal Canadian Mounted Police. A visual and theatrical display by the Four Nations Tribes culminated in a massive Thunderbird symbol covering the entire inner field. This was followed by a flypast by the Snowbirds Canadian Forces aerobatic display team.

== Games ==
=== Participating teams ===
There were 63 participating nations at the 1994 Commonwealth Games. The XV Commonwealth Games marked South Africa's return to the Commonwealth Games following the apartheid era, and 36 years since the country last competed in the Games in 1958. Namibia participated in its first Games after gaining independence from South Africa in 1990, and the Caribbean island of Montserrat also made their Games debut. This was Hong Kong's last appearance at the Games before the transfer of sovereignty from Britain to China.

Participating Commonwealth Countries & Territories
- Antigua and Barbuda
- Australia
- Bahamas
- Bangladesh
- Barbados
- Belize
- Bermuda
- Botswana
- British Virgin Islands
- Brunei
- Canada (host)
- Cayman Islands
- Cook Islands
- Cyprus
- Dominica
- England
- Falkland Islands
- Gambia
- Ghana
- Gibraltar
- Guernsey
- Guyana
- Hong Kong
- India
- Isle of Man
- Jamaica
- Jersey
- Kenya
- Lesotho
- Malawi
- Malaysia
- Maldives
- Malta
- Mauritius
- Montserrat
- Namibia
- Nauru
- New Zealand
- Nigeria
- Norfolk Island
- Northern Ireland
- Pakistan
- Papua New Guinea
- Saint Kitts and Nevis
- Saint Lucia
- Saint Vincent and the Grenadines
- Scotland
- Seychelles
- Sierra Leone
- Singapore
- Solomon Islands
- South Africa
- Sri Lanka
- Swaziland
- Tanzania
- Tonga
- Trinidad and Tobago
- Uganda
- Vanuatu
- Wales
- Western Samoa
- Zambia
- Zimbabwe
Debuting Commonwealth Countries and Territories
- Montserrat
- Namibia

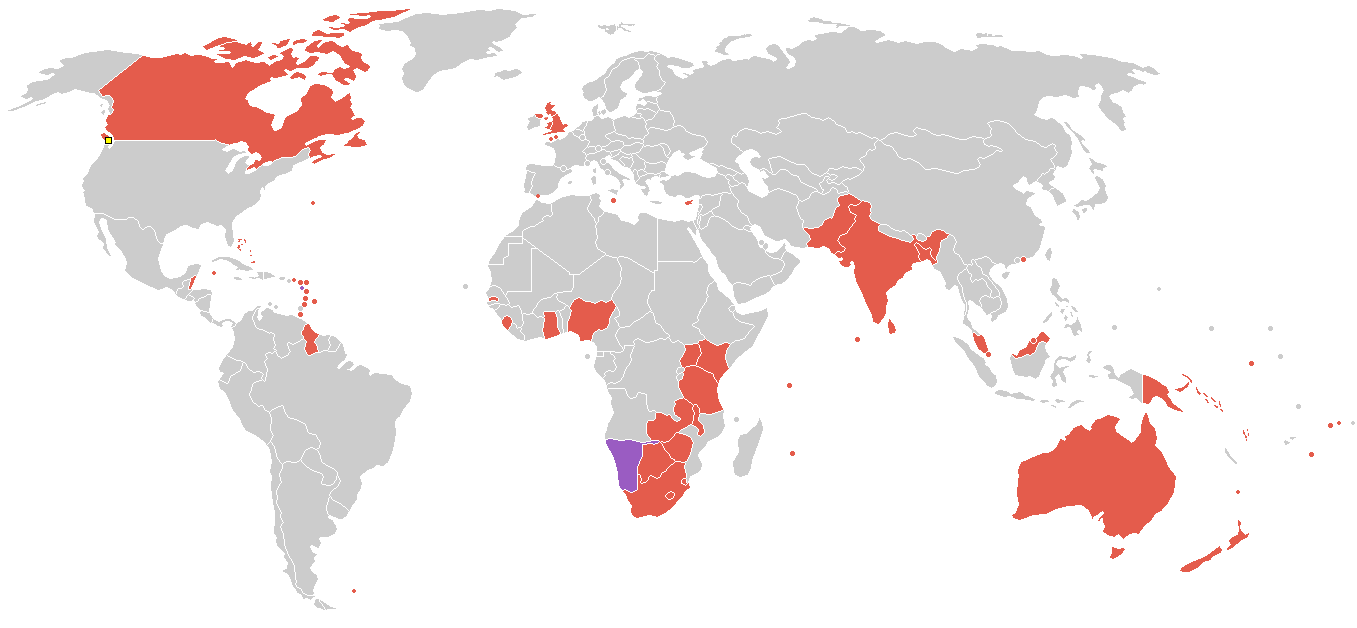
Nations that competed at the Games

=== Sports ===
There were events in 14 disciplines across 10 sports for the 1994 Commonwealth Games.

- Aquatics
  - Diving (6)
  - Swimming (34)
  - Synchronised swimming (2)
- Athletics (44)
- Badminton (5)
- Boxing (12)
- Cycling
  - Road (4)
  - Track (9)
- Gymnastics
  - Artistic gymnastics (14)
  - Rhythmic gymnastics (6)
- Lawn bowls (8)
- Shooting (32)
- Weightlifting (30)
- Wrestling (10)

=== Calendar ===
The following table shows a summary of the competition schedule.

OC	Opening ceremony	●	Event competitions	1	Event finals	CC	Closing ceremony

August	18 Thu	19 Fri	20 Sat	21 Sun	22 Mon	23 Tue	24 Wed	25 Thu	26 Fri	27 Sat	28 Sun	Events
Ceremonies	OC										CC	
Athletics					1	9	4	2	11	6	11	44
Badminton		●	●	1		●	●	●	●	5		6
Boxing		●	●	●	●	●	●	●		12		12
Cycling		2		2			1	3	2	3		13
Diving		●	2			●	2	2				6
Gymnastics		1	1	2	10			1	1	4		20
Lawn bowls		●	●	●	2	●	●	2	2	2		8
Shooting		4	4	4	4	4	3	3	3	3		32
Synchronised swimming		●	●	●	2							2
Swimming		6	5	6	5	6	6					34
Weightlifting						6	6	6	6	6		30
Wrestling		●	5	5								10
Total events		13	17	20	24	25	22	19	25	41	11	217
Cumulative total		13	30	50	74	99	121	140	165	206	217	
August	18 Thu	19 Fri	20 Sat	21 Sun	22 Mon	23 Tue	24 Wed	25 Thu	26 Fri	27 Sat	28 Sun	Events

=== Medal table ===
This is a full table of the medal count of the 1994 Commonwealth Games. These rankings sort by the number of gold medals earned by a country. The number of silvers is taken into consideration next and then the number of bronze. If, after the above, countries are still tied, equal ranking is given and they are listed alphabetically. This follows the system used by the IOC, IAAF and BBC.

This was the first time since the commencement of the British Empire Games (in 1930) that England did not achieve a medal ranking in the top two.

* Host nation (Canada)

Rank	Nation	Gold	Silver	Bronze	Total
1	Australia	87	52	43	182
2	Canada*	40	42	46	128
3	England	31	45	49	125
4	Nigeria	11	13	13	37
5	Kenya	7	4	5	16
6	India	6	11	7	24
7	Scotland	6	3	11	20
8	New Zealand	5	16	20	41
9	Wales	5	8	6	19
10	Northern Ireland	5	2	3	10
11	Nauru	3	0	0	3
12	South Africa	2	4	5	11
13	Jamaica	2	4	2	8
14	Malaysia	2	3	2	7
15	Cyprus	2	1	2	5
16	Sri Lanka	1	2	0	3
17	Zambia	1	1	2	4
18	Namibia	1	0	1	2
19	Zimbabwe	0	3	3	6
20	Papua New Guinea	0	1	0	1
20	Western Samoa	0	1	0	1
22	Hong Kong	0	0	4	4
23	Pakistan	0	0	3	3
24	Trinidad and Tobago	0	0	2	2
24	Uganda	0	0	2	2
26	Bermuda	0	0	1	1
26	Botswana	0	0	1	1
26	Ghana	0	0	1	1
26	Guernsey	0	0	1	1
26	Norfolk Island	0	0	1	1
26	Seychelles	0	0	1	1
26	Tanzania	0	0	1	1
26	Tonga	0	0	1	1
Totals (33 entries)		217	216	239	672

== Marketing ==
=== Mascot ===
The official mascot of the Games was an anthropomorphic killer whale named "Klee Wyck". This nickname, meaning "the laughing one", was given to Canadian painter and sculptor Emily Carr by the Yuułuʔiłʔatḥ Nation.

== See also ==
- Knowledge Totem Pole
- Victoria bid for the 2022 Commonwealth Games

Preceded by Auckland	Commonwealth Games; Victoria; XV Commonwealth Games	Succeeded by Kuala Lumpur
