= Boxing at the 1992 Summer Olympics – Welterweight =

Welterweight boxing at the Games of the XXV Olympiad
- Venue: Pavelló Club Joventut Badalona
- Dates: 26 July – 8 August 1992
- Competitors: 30 from 30 nations

Medalists
1st place, gold medalist(s)		Michael Carruth	Ireland
2nd place, silver medalist(s)		Juan Hernández Sierra	Cuba
3rd place, bronze medalist(s)		Aníbal Santiago Acevedo	Puerto Rico
3rd place, bronze medalist(s)		Arkhom Chenglai	Thailand

The men's welterweight event was part of the boxing programme at the 1992 Summer Olympics. The weight class allowed boxers of up to 67 kilograms to compete. The competition was held from 26 July to 8 August 1992. 30 boxers from 30 nations competed.

== Medalists ==
Gold	Michael Carruth; Ireland
Silver	Juan Hernández Sierra; Cuba
Bronze	Aníbal Santiago Acevedo; Puerto Rico
Bronze	Arkhom Chenglai; Thailand

== Results ==
The following boxers took part in the event:

Rank	Name	Country
1	Michael Carruth	Ireland
2	Juan Hernández Sierra	Cuba
3T	Aníbal Santiago Acevedo	Puerto Rico
3T	Arkhom Chenglai	Thailand
5T	Andreas Otto	Germany
5T	Vitalijus Karpačiauskas	Lithuania
5T	Francisc Vaştag	Romania
5T	Sören Antman	Sweden
9T	Maselino Tuifao	Samoa
9T	Mario Romero	Nicaragua
9T	Pepe Reilly	United States
9T	Nick Odore	Kenya
9T	Stefan Scriggins	Australia
9T	Adrian Carew-Dodson	Great Britain
9T	César Ramos	Dominican Republic
9T	Jeon Jin-cheol	South Korea
17T	Andrew Lewis	Guyana
17T	Shah Khyber	Pakistan
17T	Víctor Baute	Spain
17T	Andrey Pestryayev	Unified Team
17T	Yusef Khateri	Iran
17T	José de la Cruz	Venezuela
17T	Harry Simon	Namibia
17T	Francisco Moniz	Angola
17T	Masashi Kawakami	Japan
17T	Tajudeen Sabitu	Nigeria
17T	Giovanni Pretorius	South Africa
17T	Wiesław Małyszko	Poland
17T	Abdellah Taouane	Morocco
17T	Saïd Ben Najem	France

=== First round ===
- Michael Carruth (IRL) – BYE
- Maselino Tuifao (SAM) – BYE
- Andreas Otto (GER) def. Andrew Luis (GUY), 8:7
- Mario Romero (NIC) def. Khyber Shah (PAK), 7:2
- Pepe Reilly (USA) def. Víctor Baute (ESP), RSC-3
- Vitalijus Karpačiauskas (LTU) def. Andrey Pestryayev (EUN), 9:4
- Arkhom Chenglai (THA) def. Yousef Khateri (IRN), 13:7
- Nicodemus Odore (KEN) def. José Guzman (VEN), RSCH-2
- Aníbal Santiago Acevedo (PUR) def. Harry Simon (NAM), 13:11
- Stefan Scriggins (AUS) def. Francisco Moniz (ANG), 6:2
- Adrian Dodson (GBR) def. Masashi Kawakami (JPN), RSC-3
- Francisc Vaştag (ROM) def. Tajudeen Sabitu (NGR), 9:0
- Sören Antman (SWE) def. Giovanni Pretorius (SAF), RSC-1
- César Augusto Ramoz (DOM) def. Wieslaw Malyszko (POL), 6:1
- Jun Jin-Chul (KOR) def. Abdellah Taouane (MAR), 5:1
- Juan Hernández Sierra (CUB) def. Said Bennajem (FRA), 6:0

=== Second round ===
- Michael Carruth (IRL) def. Maselino Tuifao (SAM), 11:2
- Andreas Otto (GER) def. Mario Romero (NIC), RSCH-2
- Vitalijus Karpačiauskas (LTU) def. Pepe Reilly (USA), 16:5
- Arkhom Chenglai (THA) def. Nicodemus Odore (KEN), 13:10
- Aníbal Santiago Acevedo (PUR) def. Stefan Scriggins (AUS), 16:3
- Francisc Vaştag (ROM) def. Adrian Dodson (GBR), 6:5
- Sören Antman (SWE) def. César Augusto Ramoz (DOM), RSC-2
- Juan Hernández Sierra (CUB) def. Jun Jin-Chul (KOR), RSC-2

=== Quarterfinals ===
- Michael Carruth (IRL) def. Andreas Otto (GER), 35:22
- Arkhom Chenglai (THA) def. Vitalijus Karpačiauskas (LTU), 9:6
- Aníbal Santiago Acevedo (PUR) def. Francisc Vaştag (ROM), 20:9
- Juan Hernández Sierra (CUB) dev. Sören Antman (SWE), RSCH-2

=== Semifinals ===
- Michael Carruth (IRL) def. Arkhom Chenglai (THA), 11:4
- Juan Hernández Sierra (CUB) def. Aníbal Santiago Acevedo (PUR), 11:2

=== Final ===
- Michael Carruth (IRL) def. Juan Hernández Sierra (CUB), 13:10
