= Boxing at the 1992 Summer Olympics – Light flyweight =

Boxing at the Olympics

Light flyweight boxing at the Games of the XXV Olympiad
- Venue: Pavelló Club Joventut Badalona
- Dates: 26 July – 8 August
- Competitors: 30 from 30 nations

Medalists
1st place, gold medalist(s)		Rogelio Marcelo	Cuba
2nd place, silver medalist(s)		Daniel Petrov	Bulgaria
3rd place, bronze medalist(s)		Jan Quast	Germany
3rd place, bronze medalist(s)		Roel Velasco	Philippines

The men's light flyweight event was part of the boxing programme at the 1992 Summer Olympics. The weight class was the lightest contested, and allowed boxers of up to 48 kilograms to compete. The competition was held from 26 July to 8 August 1992. 30 boxers from 30 nations competed.

== Medalists ==
Gold	Rogelio Marcelo; Cuba
Silver	Daniel Petrov; Bulgaria
Bronze	Jan Quast; Germany
Bronze	Roel Velasco; Philippines

== Results ==
The following boxers took part in the event:

Rank	Name	Country
1	Rogelio Marcelo	Cuba
2	Daniel Petrov	Bulgaria
3T	Jan Quast	Germany
3T	Roel Velasco	Philippines
5T	Rowan Williams	Great Britain
5T	Rafael Lozano	Spain
5T	Pál Lakatos	Hungary
5T	Valentin Barbu	Romania
9T	Stephen Ahialey	Ghana
9T	Rajendra Prasad	India
9T	Erdenotsogtyn Tsogtjargal	Mongolia
9T	Eric Griffin	United States
9T	O Song-chol	North Korea
9T	Jo Dong-beom	South Korea
9T	Tadahiro Sasaki	Japan
9T	Pramuansak Phosuwan	Thailand
17T	James Wanene	Kenya
17T	Andrzej Rżany	Poland
17T	Mfamsibili Mnisi	Swaziland
17T	Luis Retayud	Colombia
17T	Khela Fana Thwala	South Africa
17T	Fausto del Rosario	Dominican Republic
17T	Nelson Dieppa	Puerto Rico
17T	Anicet Rasoanaivo	Madagascar
17T	Luigi Castiglione	Italy
17T	Volodymyr Hanchenko	Unified Team
17T	Domenic Figliomeni	Canada
17T	Mohamed Haioun	Algeria
17T	Mohamed Zbir	Morocco
17T	St. Aubyn Hines	Jamaica

Winner	Result	Loser
First Round
Rowan Williams (GBR)	BYE	
Stephen Ahialey (GHA)	BYE	
Roel Velasco (PHI)	16:1	James Wanene (KEN)
Rajendra Prasad (IND)	12:6	Andrzej Rżany (POL)
Rogelio Marcelo (CUB)	RSC-3	Mfamasibili Mnisi (SWZ)
Erdenentsogt Tsogtjargal (MGL)	8:2	Fernando Retayud (COL)
Rafael Lozano (ESP)	9:0	Abram Thwala (RSA)
Eric Griffin (USA)	14:2	Fausto del Rosario (DOM)
Daniel Petrov (BUL)	10:7	Nelson Dieppa (PUR)
O Song-chol (PRK)	KO-2	Anicet Rasoanaivo (MAD)
Jo Dong-beom (KOR)	8:2	Luigi Castiglione (ITA)
Pál Lakatos (HUN)	RSC-2	Vladimir Ganchenko (EUN)
Tadahiro Sasaki (JPN)	5:3	Domenic Figliomeni (CAN)
Valentin Barbu (ROM)	11:2	Mohammed Haioun (ALG)
Jan Quast (GER)	6:0	Mohamed Zbir (MAR)
Pramuansak Phosuwan (THA)	RSC-2	St. Aubyn Hines (JAM)
Second Round
Rowan Williams (GBR)	11:3	Stephen Ahialey (GHA)
Roel Velasco (PHI)	15:6	Rajendra Prasad (IND)
Rogelio Marcelo (CUB)	14:2	Erdenentsogt Tsogtjargal (MGL)
Rafael Lozano (ESP)	6:2	Eric Griffin (USA)
Daniel Petrov (BUL)	RSC-3	O Song-chol (PRK)
Pál Lakatos (HUN)	20:15	Jo Dong-beom (KOR)
Valentin Barbu (ROM)	10:7	Tadahiro Sasaki (JPN)
Jan Quast (GER)	11:2	Pramuansak Phosuwan (THA)
Quarterfinals
Roel Velasco (PHI)	7:6	Rowan Williams (GBR)
Rogelio Marcelo (CUB)	11:3	Rafael Lozano (ESP)
Daniel Petrov (BUL)	17:8	Pál Lakatos (HUN)
Jan Quast (GER)	15:7	Valentin Barbu (ROM)
Semifinals
Rogelio Marcelo (CUB)	RSCH-1	Roel Velasco (PHI)
Daniel Petrov (BUL)	15:9	Jan Quast (GER)
Final
Rogelio Marcelo (CUB)	20:10	Daniel Petrov (BUL)
