= Boxing at the 1992 Summer Olympics – Flyweight =

Boxing at the Olympics

Flyweight boxing at the Games of the XXV Olympiad
- Venue: Pavelló Club Joventut Badalona
- Dates: 27 July – 9 August 1992
- Competitors: 31 from 31 nations

Medalists
1st place, gold medalist(s)		Choi Chol-su	North Korea
2nd place, silver medalist(s)		Raúl González	Cuba
3rd place, bronze medalist(s)		Tim Austin	United States
3rd place, bronze medalist(s)		István Kovács	Hungary

The men's flyweight event was part of the boxing programme at the 1992 Summer Olympics. The weight class allowed boxers of up to 51 kilograms to compete. The competition was held from 27 July to 9 August 1992. 31 boxers from 31 nations competed.

== Medalists ==
Gold	Choi Chol-su; North Korea
Silver	Raúl González; Cuba
Bronze	Tim Austin; United States
Bronze	István Kovács; Hungary

== Results ==
The following boxers took part in the event:

Rank	Name	Country
1	Choi Chol-su	North Korea
2	Raúl González	Cuba
3T	Tim Austin	United States
3T	István Kovács	Hungary
5T	Benjamin Mwangata	Tanzania
5T	David Serradas	Venezuela
5T	Héctor Avila	Dominican Republic
5T	Robbie Peden	Australia
9T	Yuliyan Strogov	Bulgaria
9T	Luiz Freitas	Brazil
9T	Moses Malagu	Nigeria
9T	Mario Loch	Germany
9T	Isidro Vicera	Philippines
9T	Jesper Jensen	Denmark
9T	Paul Ingle	Great Britain
9T	Yacine Sheikh	Algeria
17T	Ronnie Noan	Papua New Guinea
17T	Han Gwang-hyeong	South Korea
17T	Narciso González	Mexico
17T	Leszek Olszewski	Poland
17T	Paul Buttimer	Ireland
17T	Vichai Khadpo	Thailand
17T	Angel Chacón	Puerto Rico
17T	Liu Gang	China
17T	Stanislav Vagaský	Czechoslovakia
17T	Dharmendra Yadav	India
17T	Hamid Berhili	Morocco
17T	Alex Baba	Ghana
17T	Moustafa Esmail	Egypt
17T	Anatoly Filippov	Unified Team
17T	Marty O'Donnell	Canada

=== First round ===
- Timothy Austin (USA) – BYE
- Yuliyan Strogov (BUL) def. Ronnie Noan (PNG), RSCI-2 (02:03)
- Luis Claudio Freitas (BRA) def. Gwang-Hyung Han (KOR), 15:9
- Benjamin Mwangata (TAN) def. Narciso González (MEX), RSCH-3 (01:43)
- Raúl González (CUB) def. Leszek Olszewski (POL), 15:7
- Moses Malagu (NGR) def. Paul Buttimer (IRL), 12:8
- Mario Loch (GER) def. Vichai Khadpo (THA), RSCI-2 (00:16)
- David Serradas (VEN) def. Angel Chacón (PUR), 12:3
- Héctor Avila (DOM) def. Liu Gang (CHN), RSC-2 (02:38)
- Isidrio Visvera (PHI) def. Stanislav Vagaský (TCH), 17:0
- István Kovács (HUN) def. Dharmendra Yadav (IND), 21:5
- Jesper Jensen (DEN) def. Hamid Berhili (MAR), 10:4
- Paul Ingle (GBR) def. Alexander Baba (GHA), 9:7
- Choi Chol-Su (PRK) def. Moustafa Esmail (EGY), 7:4
- Yacin Chikh (ALG) def. Anatoly Filipov (EUN), 5:3
- Robert Peden (AUS) def. Marty O'Donnell (CAN), 14:2

=== Second round ===
- Timothy Austin (USA) def. Yuliyan Strogov (BUL), 19:7
- Benjamin Mwangata (TAN) def. Luis Claudio Freitas (BRA), 8:7
- Raúl González (CUB) def. Moses Malagu (NGR), RSCI-2 (00:23)
- David Serradas (VEN) def. Mario Loch (GER), 9:4
- Héctor Avila (DOM) def. Isidrio Visvera (PHI), 17:5
- István Kovács (HUN) def. Jesper Jensen (DEN), 14:0
- Choi Chol-Su (PRK) def. Paul Ingle (GBR), 13:12
- Robert Peden (AUS) def. Yacin Chikh (ALG), KO-2 (00:21)

=== Quarterfinals ===
- Timothy Austin (USA) def. Benjamin Mwangata (TAN), 19:8
- Raúl González (CUB) def. David Serradas (VEN), 14:7
- István Kovács (HUN) def. Héctor Avila (DOM), 17:3
- Choi Chol-Su (PRK) def. Robert Peden (AUS), 25:11

=== Semifinals ===
- Raúl González (CUB) def. Timothy Austin (USA) RSCH-1 (01:04)
- Choi Chol-Su (PRK) def. István Kovács (HUN), 10:5

=== Final ===
- Choi Chol-Su (PRK) def. Raúl González (CUB), 12:2
