= Philippines at the 1992 Summer Olympics =

- Flag of the Philippines
- IOC code: PHI
- NOC: Philippine Olympic Committee

in Barcelona
- Competitors: 26 (24 men, 2 women) in 9 sports
- Flag bearer: Arlo Chavez
- Medals Ranked 54th: Gold 0 Silver 0 Bronze 1 Total 1

Summer Olympics appearances (overview)
- 1924; 1928; 1932; 1936; 1948; 1952; 1956; 1960; 1964; 1968; 1972; 1976; 1980; 1984; 1988; 1992; 1996; 2000; 2004; 2008; 2012; 2016; 2020; 2024

The Philippines competed at the 1992 Summer Olympics in Barcelona, Spain. 26 competitors, 24 men and 2 women, took part in 29 events in 9 sports. Stephen Fernandez and Beatriz Lucero won a bronze medal each in taekwondo, but their medals were not included in the official medal tally because taekwondo was only a demonstration event.

== Medalists ==
| Medal | Name | Sport | Event | Date |
|---|---|---|---|---|
| Bronze | Roel Velasco | Boxing | Light flyweight | 6 August |

== Competitors ==
The following is the list of number of competitors in the Games.

| Sport | Men | Women | Total |
|---|---|---|---|
| Athletics | 3 | 0 | 3 |
| Boxing | 6 | – | 6 |
| Cycling | 2 | 0 | 2 |
| Equestrian | 0 | 1 | 1 |
| Fencing | 1 | 0 | 1 |
| Judo | 2 | 0 | 2 |
| Sailing | 4 | 0 | 4 |
| Shooting | 2 | 0 | 2 |
| Swimming | 4 | 1 | 5 |
| Total | 24 | 2 | 26 |

== Athletics ==
Track & road events

| Athletes | Events | Heat Round 1 | | Heat Round 2 | | Semifinal | | Final | |
| Athletes | Events | Time | Rank | Time | Rank | Time | Rank | Time | Rank |
|---|---|---|---|---|---|---|---|---|---|
| Herman Suizo | Marathon | N/A | | | | | | 2:25:18 | 52 |
| Hector Begeo | 3000 m steeplechase | 9:14.48 | 11 | —N/a | | | | Did not advance | |

Field events

| Athlete | Event | Qualification | | Final | |
| Athlete | Event | Distance | Position | Distance | Position |
|---|---|---|---|---|---|
| Edward Lasquete | Pole vault | 5.00 NR | =28 | Did not advance | |

== Boxing ==
| Athlete | Event | Round of 32 | Round of 16 | Quarterfinals | Semifinals | Final | |
| Athlete | Event | Opposition Result | Opposition Result | Opposition Result | Opposition Result | Opposition Result | Rank |
|---|---|---|---|---|---|---|---|
| Roel Velasco | Light Flyweight | Wanene (KEN); W 16-1 | Prasad (IND); W 15-6 | Williams (GBR); W 7-6 | Marcelo (CUB); L RSCH-1 | Did not advance | 3rd place, bronze medalist(s) |
| Isidro Vicera | Flyweight | Vagaský (TCH); W 17-0 | Ávila (DOM); L 5-17 | Did not advance | | | |
| Roberto Jalnaiz | Bantamweight | Castillo (DOM); W RSCH-1 | Wartelle (FRA); W RSCI-2 | Casamayor (CUB); L KO-1 | Did not advance | | |
| Charlie Baleña | Featherweight | Lifa (FRA); L 12-20 | Did not advance | | | | |
| Ronald Chavez | Lightweight | Rizk (EGY); W 18-10 | Irwin (CAN); W 8-1 | Hong (KOR); L KO-1 | Did not advance | | |
| Arlo Chavez | Light welterweight | James (NGR); W 12-6 | Doroftei (ROM); L 15-1 | Did not advance | | | |

== Cycling ==
| Athlete | Event | Time | Rank |
|---|---|---|---|
| Norberto Oconer | Road race | Did not finish | |
| Domingo Villanueva | Road race | Did not finish | |

== Equestrian ==
| Athlete | Horse | Event | Qualifying | | | | | Final | Rank |
| Athlete | Horse | Event | Round 1 | Round 2 | Round 3 | Total points | Rank | Final | Rank |
|---|---|---|---|---|---|---|---|---|---|
| Denise Cojuangco | Nimmerdor | Individual Jumping | 11.00 | 25.00 | - | 36.00 | 77 | did not advance | |

== Fencing ==
| Athlete | Event | Preliminary round | Round of 32 | Round of 16 | Quarterfinal | Semifinal | Final | Final rank |
|---|---|---|---|---|---|---|---|---|
| Walter Torres | Foil | 1–5 | Did not advance | | | | | 53 |

== Judo ==
| Athlete | Event | Round of 64 | Round of 32 | Round of 16 | Quarterfinals | Semifinals | Repechage | Final / BM | |
| Athlete | Event | Opposition Result | Opposition Result | Opposition Result | Opposition Result | Opposition Result | Opposition Result | Opposition Result | Rank |
|---|---|---|---|---|---|---|---|---|---|
| Jerry Dino | Men's −60 kg | García (VEN); L IPO | Did not advance | | | | | | |
| John Baylon | Men's −78 kg | Bye | Kamiński (POL); L IPO | Did not advance | | | | | |

== Sailing ==
Men

| Athlete | Event | Race | | | | | | | | | | Net points | Final rank |
| Athlete | Event | 1 | 2 | 3 | 4 | 5 | 6 | 7 | 8 | 9 | 10 | Net points | Final rank |
|---|---|---|---|---|---|---|---|---|---|---|---|---|---|
| Richard Paz | Lechner A-390 | 34 | 39 | 30 | 27 | 29 | 35 | 22 | 30 | ~~35~~ | 30 | 294.0 | 30 |

Open

| Athlete | Event | Race | | | | | | | Net points | Final rank |
| Athlete | Event | 1 | 2 | 3 | 4 | 5 | 6 | 7 | Net points | Final rank |
|---|---|---|---|---|---|---|---|---|---|---|
| Mario Almario; Teodorico Asejo; Juan Miguel Torres | Soling | 30 | 30 | 27 | 30 | 29 | 27 | —N/a | 143.0 | 24 |

== Shooting ==
| Athlete | Event | Qualification | | Semifinal | | Final | | Rank |
| Athlete | Event | Score | Rank | Score | Rank | Score | Total | Rank |
|---|---|---|---|---|---|---|---|---|
| Emerito Concepción | Men's 10 m air rifle | 573 | 41 | Did not advance | | | | |
| Jaime Recio | Trap | 133 | 49 | Did not advance | | | | |

== Swimming ==
Men

| Athlete | Event | Heat | | Final B | | Final | |
| Athlete | Event | Time | Rank | Time | Rank | Time | Rank |
|---|---|---|---|---|---|---|---|
| Raymond Papa | 100 m backstroke | 59.58 | 43 | Did not advance | | | |
| Leo Najera | 100 m backstroke | 59.92 | 44 | Did not advance | | | |
| Raymond Papa | 200 m backstroke | Did not advance (DSQ) | | | | | |
| Joseph Eric Buhain | 100 m breaststroke | 1:04.28 | 30 | Did not advance | | | |
| Lee Concepcion | 100 m breaststroke | 1:05.16 | 35 | Did not advance | | | |
| Lee Concepcion | 200 m breaststroke | 2:20.33 | 28 | Did not advance | | | |
| Joseph Eric Buhain | 100 m butterfly | 56.19 | 36 | Did not advance | | | |
| Leo Najera | 100 m butterfly | 58.50 | 54 | Did not advance | | | |
| Joseph Eric Buhain | 200 m individual medley | 2:09.33 | 38 | Did not advance | | | |
| Joseph Eric Buhain; Lee Concepcion; Leo Najera; Raymond Papa | 4 x 100 m medley relay | 3:53.64 | 18 | Did not advance | | | |

Women

| Athlete | Event | Heat | | Final B | | Final | |
| Athlete | Event | Time | Rank | Time | Rank | Time | Rank |
|---|---|---|---|---|---|---|---|
| Gillian Thomson | 100 m freestyle | 59.02 | 34 | Did not advance | | | |
| Gillian Thomson | 200 m freestyle | 2:07.95 | 29 | Did not advance | | | |
| Gillian Thomson | 100 m backstroke | 1:04.32 | 18 | Did not advance | | | |
| Gillian Thomson | 200 m backstroke | 2:16.44 | 19 | Did not advance | | | |

== Demonstration sports ==
=== Basque pelota ===
The Mexicans defeated the Philippine team in the cesta punta event of basque pelota (jai alai).

| Athlete | Event | Round robin | | Semifinals | Final / BM | |
| Athlete | Event | Opposition Result | Rank | Opposition Result | Opposition Result | Rank |
|---|---|---|---|---|---|---|
| Pablo Garlit; Michael Garlit; Neil Diaz Agbayani | Basket-pelota (54m) | Compañón / Oyanguren (ESP); L 40–10 (P. Garlit / Agbayani) | 4 | Compañón / Mugartegui (ESP); L 40–17 (P. Garlit / Agbayani) | J. Valdés / F. Valdés (MEX); L 40–10 (P. Garlit / Agbayani) | 4 |
| Pablo Garlit; Michael Garlit; Neil Diaz Agbayani | Basket-pelota (54m) | J. Valdés / F. Valdés (MEX); L 40–16 (P. Garlit / M. Garlit) | 4 | Compañón / Mugartegui (ESP); L 40–17 (P. Garlit / Agbayani) | J. Valdés / F. Valdés (MEX); L 40–10 (P. Garlit / Agbayani) | 4 |
| Pablo Garlit; Michael Garlit; Neil Diaz Agbayani | Basket-pelota (54m) | Etcheberry / Etchalusy (FRA); L 40–10 (P. Garlit / Agbayani) | 4 | Compañón / Mugartegui (ESP); L 40–17 (P. Garlit / Agbayani) | J. Valdés / F. Valdés (MEX); L 40–10 (P. Garlit / Agbayani) | 4 |
| Pablo Garlit; Michael Garlit; Neil Diaz Agbayani | Basket-pelota (54m) | Mugartegui / Celaya (ESP); L 40–11 (P. Garlit / M. Garlit) | 4 | Compañón / Mugartegui (ESP); L 40–17 (P. Garlit / Agbayani) | J. Valdés / F. Valdés (MEX); L 40–10 (P. Garlit / Agbayani) | 4 |
| Pablo Garlit; Michael Garlit; Neil Diaz Agbayani | Basket-pelota (54m) | J. Valdés / Ugartechea (MEX); L 40–19 (P. Garlit / Agbayani) | 4 | Compañón / Mugartegui (ESP); L 40–17 (P. Garlit / Agbayani) | J. Valdés / F. Valdés (MEX); L 40–10 (P. Garlit / Agbayani) | 4 |
| Pablo Garlit; Michael Garlit; Neil Diaz Agbayani | Basket-pelota (54m) | Bordes / Ahadoberry (FRA); L 40–9 (P. Garlit / M. Garlit) | 4 | Compañón / Mugartegui (ESP); L 40–17 (P. Garlit / Agbayani) | J. Valdés / F. Valdés (MEX); L 40–10 (P. Garlit / Agbayani) | 4 |

=== Taekwondo ===
| Athlete | Event | Quarterfinals | Semifinals | Final / BM | |
| Athlete | Event | Opposition Result | Opposition Result | Opposition Result | Rank |
|---|---|---|---|---|---|
| Walter Dean Vargas | Men's Flyweight (50–54 kg) | Wang (TPE); L 3–4 | Did not advance | | |
| Stephen Fernandez | Men's Bantamweight (54–58 kg) | Yanez (CHI); W 2–2 | Najem (CAN); L -1–0 | Did not advance | 3rd place, bronze medalist(s) |
| Beatriz Lucero | Women's Featherweight (51–55 kg) | Zigmantovich (EUN); W WD | Ergin (TUR); L 1–2 | Did not advance | 3rd place, bronze medalist(s) |
| Mary Alindogan | Women's Middleweight (65–70 kg) | Lee (KOR); L WD | Did not advance | | |
