= North Korea at the 1992 Summer Olympics =

- IOC code: PRK
- NOC: Olympic Committee of the Democratic People's Republic of Korea

in Barcelona
- Competitors: 64 (36 men, 28 women) in 12 sports
- Flag bearer: Kim Gil-nam
- Medals Ranked 16th: Gold 4 Silver 0 Bronze 5 Total 9

Summer Olympics appearances (overview)
- 1972; 1976; 1980; 1984–1988; 1992; 1996; 2000; 2004; 2008; 2012; 2016; 2020; 2024; 2028

North Korea competed as the Democratic People's Republic of Korea at the 1992 Summer Olympics in Barcelona, Spain. It was the nation's first appearance in twelve years at the Summer Games due to its boycotting the 1984 Summer Olympics in Los Angeles, California and the 1988 Summer Olympics in Seoul. 64 competitors, 36 men and 28 women, took part in 53 events in 12 sports.

== Medalists ==
Medal	Name	Sport	Event	Date
Gold	Pae Gil-su	Gymnastics	Men's pommel horse	2 August
Gold	Ri Hak-son	Wrestling	Men's freestyle 52 kg	5 August
Gold	Kim Il	Wrestling	Men's freestyle 48 kg	6 August
Gold	Choi Chol-su	Boxing	Flyweight	9 August
Bronze	Kim Myong-nam	Weightlifting	Men's 75 kg	30 July
Bronze	Ri Pun-hui; Yu Sun-bok	Table tennis	Women's doubles	1 August
Bronze	Ri Pun-hui	Table tennis	Women's singles	4 August
Bronze	Ri Gwang-sik	Boxing	Bantamweight	6 August
Bronze	Kim Yong-sik	Wrestling	Men's freestyle 57 kg	7 August

== Competitors ==
The following is the list of number of competitors in the Games.

Sport	Men	Women	Total
Archery	0	3	3
Athletics	1	2	3
Boxing	6	–	6
Cycling	0	3	3
Diving	0	4	4
Gymnastics	3	8	11
Judo	2	1	3
Shooting	6	3	9
Table tennis	4	4	8
Weightlifting	10	–	10
Wrestling	4	–	4
Total	36	28	64

== Archery ==
Women's Individual Competition:

- Kim Jong-hwa – Round of 32, 19th place (0–1)
- Li Myong-gum – Round of 32, 29th place (0–1)
- Sin Song-hui – Ranking round, 52nd place (0–0)

Women's Team Competition:

- Kim, Li, and Sin – Quarterfinal, 7th place (1–1)

== Athletics ==
Men's Marathon

- Ryu Ok-hyon – 2:40.51 (→ 80th place)

Women's Marathon

- Mun Gyong-ae – 2:37.03 (→ 6th place)

Women's Long Jump

- Ri Yong-ae

- Heat – 6.17 m (→ did not advance)

== Boxing ==
Men's Light flyweight (– 48 kg)

- O Song-chol

- First Round – Defeated Anicet Rasoanaivo (MAD), KO-2
- Second Round – Lost to Daniel Petrov (BUL), RSC-3

Men's Lightweight (– 60 kg)

- Yun Yong-chol (Note: also competed at the 1992 Asian Amateur Boxing Championships Silver)

- First Round – Lost to Hong Sung-sik (KOR), 11:2

== Cycling ==
Three cyclists, all women, represented North Korea in 1992.

Women's Individual Road Race

- Pak Chun-wa – 2:38:38 (→ 53rd place)
- Kim Gyong-hui – 2:39:43 (→ 54th place)
- Choi In-ae – did not finish (→ no ranking)

== Diving ==
Women's 3m Springboard

- Kim Myong-son

- Preliminary Heat – 232.65 points (→ did not advance, 28th place)

- Kim Hye-ok

- Preliminary Heat – 206.64 points (→ did not advance, 29th place)

Women's 10m Platform

- Kim Chun-ok

- Preliminary Round – 282.36 points (→ 18th place)

- Ryu Un-Sil

- Preliminary Round – 282.36 points (→ 23rd place)
