= Western Samoa at the 1992 Summer Olympics =

- IOC code: WSM
- NOC: Samoa Association of Sports and National Olympic Committee
- Website: www.oceaniasport.com/samoa

in Barcelona
- Competitors: 5 men in 2 sports
- Medals: Gold 0 Silver 0 Bronze 0 Total 0

Summer Olympics appearances (overview)
- 1984; 1988; 1992; 1996; 2000; 2004; 2008; 2012; 2016; 2020; 2024

Western Samoa was represented at the 1992 Summer Olympics in Barcelona, Catalonia, Spain by the Samoa Association of Sports and National Olympic Committee.

In total, five athletes – all men – represented Western Samoa in two different sports including boxing and weightlifting.

Future President of Nauru Marcus Stephen competed for Western Samoa at the 1992 Summer Olympics.

== Competitors ==
In total, five athletes represented Western Samoa at the 1992 Summer Olympics in Barcelona, Catalonia, Spain across two different sports.

Sport	Men	Women	Total
Boxing	3	–	3
Weightlifting	2	–	2
Total	5	0	5

== Boxing ==
In total, three Western Samoan athletes participated in the boxing events – Likou Aliu in the middleweight category, Emilio Leti in the heavyweight category and Maselino Tuifao in the welterweight category.

The first round of the middleweight category took place on 28 July 1992. Aliu lost to Raymond Joval of the Netherlands.

The first round of the heavyweight category took place on 28 July 1992. Leti lost to Vanderlijde of the Netherlands.

The first round of the welterweight category took place on 26 July 1992. Tuifao received a bye to the second round. The second round took place on 1 August 1992. Tuifao lost to Michael Carruth of Ireland.

Athlete	Event	Round of 32	Round of 16	Quarterfinals	Semifinals	Final	
Athlete	Event	Opposition Result	Opposition Result	Opposition Result	Opposition Result	Opposition Result	Rank
Maselino Tuifao	Welterweight	Bye	Carruth (IRL); L 2–11	Did not advance			
Likou Aliu (Note: also competed at the 1988 Summer Olympics)	Middleweight	Joval (NED); L RSC R3	Did not advance				
Emilio Leti	Heavyweight	Vanderlijde (NED); L 0–14	Did not advance				

== Weightlifting ==
In total, two Western Samoan athletes participated in the weightlifting events – Marcus Stephen in the –60 kg category and Jeremiah Wallwork in the –100 kg category.

The −60 kg took place on 28 July 1992. Stephen lifted 117.5 kg (snatch) and 157.5 kg (clean and jerk) for a combined score of 275 kg which placed him ninth in the overall rankings.

The −100 kg took place on 2 August 1992. Wallwork lifted 130 kg (snatch) and 160 kg (clean and jerk) for a combined score of 290 kg which placed him 20th in the overall rankings.

Athlete	Event	Snatch		Clean & jerk		Total	Rank
Athlete	Event	Result	Rank	Result	Rank	Total	Rank
Marcus Stephen	–60 kg	117.5	14	157.5	7	275.0	9
Jeremiah Wallwork	–100 kg	130.0	22	160.0	20	290.0	20

== Aftermath ==
Weightlifter Marcus Stephen would go on to represent Nauru at the 1996 Summer Olympics in Atlanta, Georgia, United States and the 2000 Summer Olympics in Sydney, New South Wales, Australia. In 2007, he was elected as President of Nauru.
