= Shooting at the 2013 SEA Games – Men's 50 metre rifle prone Team =

The Men's 50 metre rifle prone Team event at the 2013 SEA Games took place on 11 December 2013 at the North Dagon Shooting Range in Yangon, Myanmar.

There were eight teams of three shooters competed, the results of the team competition also served as qualification for individual competition, the top eight shooters qualified to individual final

Each shooter fired 60 shots with a .22 Long Rifle at 50 metres distance from the prone position. Scores for each shot were in increments of .1, with a maximum score of 10.9, all scores from three shooters per team combine to determine team scores.

== Schedule ==
All times are Myanmar Standard Time (UTC+06:30)

Date	Time	Event
Wednesday, 11 December 2013	09:00	Final

== Results ==
Rank	Nation	Shooter	Score	Notes
1st place, gold medalist(s)	Thailand	Attapon Uea Aree (618.1); Napis Tortungpanich (612.2); Tavarit Majcharcheep (610.7)	1841.0	
2nd place, silver medalist(s)	Vietnam	Nguyen Thanh Dat (614.2); Nguyen Duy Hoang (611.8); Phung Le Huyen (611.6)	1837.6	
3rd place, bronze medalist(s)	Myanmar	Ling Aung (614.9); Aung Thuya (614.6); Wai Yan Min Thu (605.6)	1835.1	
4	Singapore	Lim Wen Yi Abel (614.3); Ong Jun Hong (608.2); Kasmijan Bin Kimin (604.3)	1826.8	
5	Indonesia	Sahurun (615.5); Rahmad Wisnuaji (606.0); I Kadek Bagiartha (600.4)	1821.9	
6	Malaysia	Mohamad Lutfi Othman (607.5); Muhammad Ezuan Nasir Khan (606.6); Nik Muhammad Aimullah Supardi (606.6)	1820.7	
7	Philippines	Jayson Valdez (610.4); Benny Cagurin (607.3); Emerito Concepcion (591.7)	1809.4	
8	Laos	Parn Douangpaseuth (605.9); Outhoone Keopaseuth (593.2); Salavaphouma Sisane (592.8)	1791.9	
