= Eric Griffin (boxer) =

American boxer (1967–2023)

Personal information
- Full name: Eric Joseph Griffin
- Born: November 3, 1967 Lafayette, Louisiana, U.S.
- Died: October 7, 2023 (aged 55) Lafayette, Louisiana, U.S.
- Height: 1.60 m (5 ft 3 in)
- Weight: 48 kg (106 lb)

Sport
- Sport: Boxing
- Weight class: Light Flyweight
- Club: Galena Park Club
Medal record
World Amateur Championships
Gold medal – first place	1989 Moscow	Light Flyweight
Gold medal – first place	1991 Sydney	Light Flyweight

Eric Griffin (November 3, 1967 – October 7, 2023) was an American professional boxer. As an amateur, he won gold medals at the 1989 and 1991 World Championships.

== Amateur career ==
As an amateur, Griffin was the co-captain of the 1992 USA Olympic Team.

=== Amateur Highlights ===
- 1987 Golden Glove Nationals 106lbs Finals Defeated Armando Martinez (Southern California) by points

1989 World Champion at Light Flyweight in competition in Moscow. Results were:

  - Defeated Gonzalez (Mexico) TKO
  - Defeated Dok-Nam Kim (North Korea) points
  - Defeated Rogelio Marcelo (Cuba) points
- 1990 Light Flyweight Gold Medalist at Goodwill Games in Seattle. Results were:
  - Defeated Alcibel Flores (Venezuela) points
  - Defeated Nshan Munchian (Soviet Union) points
  - Defeated Anatoly Filippov (Soviet Union) points
- 1991 United States Amateur Light Flyweight champion
- 1991 World Champion at Light Flyweight in competition in Sydney. Results were:
  - Defeated Dong-Bum Cho (South Korea) points
  - Defeated Tsogtjargal Erdenetsogt (Mongolia) KO 3
  - Defeated Nelson Dieppa (Puerto Rico) points
  - Defeated Rogelio Marcelo (Cuba) points

=== Olympic Results ===
- Qualified as a Light Flyweight at the United States Olympic Trials. Results were:
  - Defeated Bradley Martinez points
  - Defeated James Harris points
  - Defeated Mario Bueno points
  - Defeated Bradley Martinez (points), at Olympic Box-Offs
- Competed as a Light Flyweight at 1992 Barcelona Olympic Games. Results were
  - Defeated Fausto Rosario (Dominican Republic) points
  - Lost to Rafael Lozano (Spain) points

== Professional career ==
Griffin turned professional in 1992 and had a disappointing career. He retired in 1997 after being TKO'd in his first and only title shot, a bout for the vacant WBO light flyweight world title against Jesus Chong. Griffin's final professional boxing record is 16-4.

== Death ==
Griffin died in Lafayette, Louisiana on October 7, 2023, at the age of 55.
