= Boxing at the 1990 Central American and Caribbean Games =

Boxing competitions

The Boxing Tournament at the 1990 Central American and Caribbean Games was held in Mexico City, Mexico from November 24 to December 3, 1990.

== Medal winners ==
Event	Gold	Silver	Bronze
Light Flyweight (– 48 kilograms)	Rogelio Marcelo (CUB)	Carlos Cepeda (PUR)	Narciso González (MEX); Gregorio Tizol (GUA)
Flyweight (– 51 kilograms)	David Serradas (VEN)	Rafael Sainz (CUB)	Héctor Avila (DOM); Francisco Quiroz (PAN)
Bantamweight (– 54 kilograms)	Arnulfo Castillo (MEX)	Luis Ojeda (VEN)	Wilson Acuña (COL); Joel Casamayor (CUB)
Featherweight (– 57 kilograms)	Eddy Suarez (CUB)	Leonardo Guevara (MEX)	José Espanol (VEN); Mark Richardson (GUY)
Lightweight (– 60 kilograms)	Julio González (CUB)	Delroy Leslie (JAM)	Alexander Hernandez (DOM); Aureliano Gutierrez (VEN)
Light Welterweight (– 63.5 kilograms)	Candelario Duvergel (CUB)	Andrew Lewis (GUY)	Regino Casseres (COL); Héctor Ramírez (DOM)
Welterweight (– 67 kilograms)	Juan Hernandez Sierra (CUB)	Christian Joseph (ISV)	Alberto Torres (PUR); José Guzman (VEN)
Light Middleweight (– 71 kilograms)	Alfredo Duvergel (CUB)	Juan Martínez (VEN)	Gilberto Brown (ISV); Juan Ramón Padilla (DOM)
Middleweight (– 75 kilograms)	Orestes Solano (CUB)	Benicio Solís (PUR)	Alex James (GRN); Horacio Rivera (MEX)
Light Heavyweight (– 81 kilograms)	Jorge Gonzalez (CUB)	Richard Torres (PUR)	Raimundo Yant (VEN); Emmanuel Cooper (NCA)
Heavyweight (– 91 kilograms)	Félix Savón (CUB)	José Marrero (PUR)	Víctor Alarcon (COL); Manuel Verde (MEX)
Super Heavyweight (+ 91 kilograms)	Armando Campuzano (CUB)	Harold Arroyo (PUR)	Andres Riojano (MEX); Horace Laing (JAM)
