= Juan Hernández Sierra =

Cuban boxer (born 1969)

Juan Hernández
Personal information
- Full name: Juan Hernández Sierra
- Born: March 16, 1969 (age 57) Guane, Pinar del Río, Cuba
Medal record
Men's boxing
Representing Cuba
Olympic Games
| Silver medal – second place | 1992 Barcelona | Welterweight |
| Silver medal – second place | 1996 Atlanta | Welterweight |
World Championships
| Gold medal – first place | 1991 Sydney | Welterweight |
| Gold medal – first place | 1993 Tampere | Welterweight |
| Gold medal – first place | 1995 Berlin | Welterweight |
| Gold medal – first place | 1999 Houston | Welterweight |
| Bronze medal – third place | 1997 Budapest | Welterweight |
Pan American Games
| Gold medal – first place | 1991 Havana | Welterweight |
| Gold medal – first place | 1999 Winnipeg | Welterweight |
Central American and Caribbean Games
| Gold medal – first place | 1990 Mexico City | Welterweight |
| Gold medal – first place | 1993 Ponce | Welterweight |
Goodwill Games
| Gold medal – first place | 1994 Saint Petersburg | Welterweight |
| Gold medal – first place | 1998 New York | Middleweight |

Juan Hernández Sierra (born March 16, 1969) is a retired amateur boxer from Cuba, who competed in the welterweight (< 67 kg) division during the 1990s. He represented his native country at three consecutive Summer Olympics, starting in 1992 in Barcelona, Spain. After having won silver on his Olympic debut, he repeated that feat in Atlanta, United States in 1996.

He became world champion in his division four times, in 1991, 1993, 1995, and 1999.

== Olympic results ==
1992

- Defeated Said Bennajem (France) 6–0
- Defeated Jin-Chul Jun (South Korea) RSC 2
- Defeated Sören Antman (Sweden) RSC 3
- Defeated Aníbal Acevedo (Puerto Rico) 11–2
- Lost to Michael Carruth (Ireland) 10–13

1996

- Defeated Jozsef Nagy (Hungary) RSC 2
- Defeated Vadim Mezga (Belarus) 12–2
- Defeated Nurzhan Smanov (Kazakhstan) 16–8
- Defeated Marian Simion (Romania) 20–7
- Lost to Oleg Saitov (Russia) 9–14

2000

- Defeated Stephan Nzue Mba (Gabon) RSC 3
- Defeated Mohamed Salad Marmouri (Tunisia) RSC 3
- Lost to Yermakhan Ibraimov (Kazakhstan) 9–16
