= Jan Quast =

German boxer

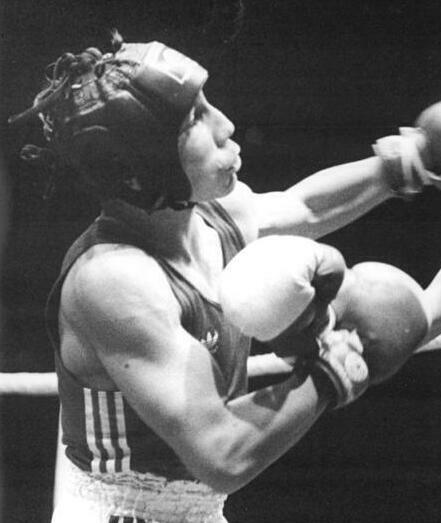
- Quast in 1987

Personal information
- Nationality: German
- Born: 9 January 1970 (age 56) Rostock, East Germany
- Height: 1.59 m (5 ft 3 in)
Medal record
Men's Boxing
Representing Germany
Olympic Games
| Bronze medal – third place | 1992 Barcelona | Light Flyweight |
European Amateur Championships
Representing East Germany
| Bronze medal – third place | 1989 Athens | Light Flyweight |

Jan Quast (born 9 January 1970 in Rostock) is a German former boxer who competed in the light flyweight (– 48 kg) division during the late 1980s, early 1990s.

== Boxing career ==
As a junior he won a bronze medal at the 1987 World Junior Championships in Havana.

He represented his native country at the 1992 Summer Olympics in Barcelona, where he won the bronze medal. In the semifinals he was stopped by Bulgaria's eventual runner-up Daniel Petrov. Quast also won the bronze medal at the 1989 European Amateur Boxing Championships in Athens and was a participant in the next three Championships in 1991 in Gothenburg, 1993 in Bursa and in 1996 in Vejle. He also participated in five World Championships in 1989 in Moscow, 1991 in Sydney, 1993 in Tampere, 1995 in Berlin and 1997 in Budapest.

He won the Chemistry Cup international tournament in Halle in 1992, 1993, 1995 and 1996.

== Olympic results ==
- Defeated Mohamed Zbir (Morocco) 5-0
- Defeated Pramuansak Phosuwan (Thailand) 11-2
- Defeated Valentin Barbu (Romania) 15-7
- Lost to Daniel Petrov (Bulgaria) 9-15
