= Liu Gang (boxer) =

Chinese boxer

Personal information
- Nationality: Chinese
- Born: 26 January 1972 (age 53); China
- Height: 169 cm (5 ft 7 in)
- Weight: 54 kg (119 lb)

Sport
- Country: China
- Sport: Boxing

Liu Gang is a Chinese former Olympic boxer. He represented his country in the flyweight division at the 1992 Summer Olympics. He lost his first bout against Héctor Ávila.

As of 2020, Liu is a boxing promoter. His family members are Hai Sheng (son), Annie (daughter), and Xin (wife).
