= Andrey Pestryayev =

Russian boxer

Personal information
- Nationality: Russian
- Born: 5 December 1969 (age 55); Sterlitamak, Soviet Union

Sport
- Sport: Boxing

Andrey Pestryayev (born 5 December 1969) is a Russian boxer. He competed in the men's welterweight event at the 1992 Summer Olympics.

== Professional boxing record ==
| 39 fights | 29 wins | 9 losses |
|---|---|---|
| By knockout | 19 | 4 |
| By decision | 10 | 5 |
| No contests | 1 | |

| No. | Result | Record | Opponent | Type | Round, time | Date | Location | Notes |
|---|---|---|---|---|---|---|---|---|
| 39 | Loss | 29–9 (1) | Alisultan Nadirbegov | KO | 6 (8) | 12 Aug 2004 | Zvezda, Samara, Russia | |
| 38 | Loss | 29–8 (1) | Pablo Navascués | TKO | 4 (8) | 21 May 2004 | Polideportivo de Alcobendas, Madrid, Spain | |
| 37 | Loss | 29–7 (1) | Serhiy Dzyndzyruk | TKO | 5 (8) | 31 Jan 2004 | Sports Palace, Kyiv, Ukraine | |
| 36 | Loss | 29–6 (1) | Kuvonchbek Toygonbaev | UD | 10 | 27 Nov 2003 | Olympysky Sports Palace, Chekhov, Russia | |
| 35 | Loss | 29–5 (1) | Richard Williams | UD | 12 | 8 Mar 2003 | York Hall, London, England | Lost WBF super welterweight title; For IBO super welterweight title |
| 34 | Win | 29–4 (1) | Steve Roberts | MD | 12 | 27 Jul 2002 | Harvey Hadden Leisure Centre, Nottingham, England | Won WBF super welterweight title |
| 33 | Win | 28–4 (1) | Aliaksandr Chiruk | UD | 6 | 25 May 2002 | Maladzyechna, Minsk region, Belarus | |
| 32 | Loss | 27–4 (1) | Yuri Tsarenka | UD | 10 | 16 Feb 2002 | Ice Palace, Novosibirsk, Russia | For vacant Russian super welterweight title |
| 31 | Win | 27–3 (1) | Volodymyr Borovskyy | SD | 6 | 22 Jan 2002 | Yubileyny Sports Palace, Saint Petersburg, Russia | |
| 30 | Win | 26–3 (1) | Viachaslau Syrovatka | UD | 8 | 11 Dec 2001 | Ice Palace, Novosibirsk, Russia | |
| 29 | Win | 25–3 (1) | Bekzhan Altynbekov | RTD | 4 (6), 3:00 | 10 Nov 2001 | Ice Palace, Novosibirsk, Russia | |
| 28 | Loss | 24–3 (1) | Alessandro Duran | UD | 12 | 18 Mar 2000 | Ferrara, Emilia-Romagna, Italy | Lost European welterweight title |
| 27 | Win | 24–2 (1) | Alessandro Duran | TKO | 6 (10) | 18 Oct 1999 | Palestra "Palacinghiale" di Ponte Rodoni, Bondeno, Italy | Won European welterweight title |
| 26 | Win | 23–2 (1) | Carlos Montero | RTD | 2 (8), 3:00 | 21 May 1999 | Thiais, Île-de-France, France | |
| 25 | Win | 22–2 (1) | Monji Abdou | UD | 8 | 13 Apr 1999 | Épernay, Grand Est, France | |
| 24 | Loss | 21–2 (1) | James Page | KO | 2 (12), 0:45 | 10 Oct 1998 | Palais Omnisport de Paris-Bercy, Paris, France | For vacant WBA welterweight title |
| 23 | Win | 21–1 (1) | Óscar Delgado | KO | 2 | 8 Apr 1998 | Galisbay, Guadeloupe, France | |
| 22 | NC | 20–1 (1) | Pernell Whitaker | UD | 12 | 17 Oct 1997 | Foxwoods Resort Casino, Ledyard, Connecticut, U.S. | Originally a UD win for Whitaker, later ruled an NC after he failed a drug test |
| 21 | Win | 20–1 | José Luis Navarro | TKO | 12 (12) | 15 Feb 1997 | Thiais, Île-de-France, France | Won vacant European welterweight title |
| 20 | Win | 19–1 | George Wilson | TKO | 3 | 2 Nov 1996 | Palais des sports Marcel-Cerdan, Paris, France | |
| 19 | Win | 18–1 | Monji Abdou | KO | 4 (6) | 20 Apr 1996 | Palais des sports Marcel-Cerdan, Paris, France | |
| 18 | Win | 17–1 | Pascal Lustenberger | PTS | 8 | 6 Jan 1996 | Palais des sports Marcel-Cerdan, Paris, France | |
| 17 | Win | 16–1 | Stefan Scriggins | TKO | 4 (10) | 29 Nov 1995 | Elephant & Castle Centre, London, England | Won vacant Pan-Asian welterweight title |
| 16 | Win | 15–1 | Victor Laureano | KO | 1 (8), 1:43 | 19 May 1995 | Lost Battalion Hall, New York City, New York, U.S. | |
| 15 | Loss | 14–1 | Robert West | SD | 10 | 31 Mar 1995 | Mountaineer Casino, Racetrack and Resort, Chester, West Virginia, U.S. | |
| 14 | Win | 14–0 | Darryl Lattimore | TKO | 10 (10) | 10 Dec 1994 | Cumberland County Civic Center, Portland, Maine, U.S. | |
| 13 | Win | 13–0 | Igor Krivyakin | PTS | 8 | 5 Aug 1994 | Norilsk, Krasnoyarsk Krai, Russia | |
| 12 | Win | 12–0 | Sergey Adamov | KO | 3 (10) | 16 Jul 1994 | Moscow, Russia | Won vacant Russian welterweight title |
| 11 | Win | 11–0 | Roman Subbotin | KO | 6 | 27 Feb 1994 | Velikiye Luki, Pskov Oblast, Russia | |
| 10 | Win | 10–0 | Vladimir Shepel | KO | 6 | 13 Feb 1994 | Stavropol, Stavropol Krai, Russia | |
| 9 | Win | 9–0 | Itoro Mkpanam | PTS | 8 | 22 Jan 1994 | Sports Palace, Almaty, Kazakhstan | |
| 8 | Win | 8–0 | Nuritdin Atakhov | KO | 3 | 18 Dec 1993 | Tuymazy, Bashkortostan, Russia | |
| 7 | Win | 7–0 | Viktor Fesechko | TKO | 4 | 6 Nov 1993 | Saint Petersburg, Russia | |
| 6 | Win | 6–0 | Eduardo Jimenez | KO | 2 | 16 Oct 1993 | Kaustik Palace, Sterlitamak, Russia | |
| 5 | Win | 5–0 | Akbar Medjidov | KO | 4 | 21 Aug 1993 | Moscow, Russia | |
| 4 | Win | 4–0 | Nikolay Vasilev | KO | 4 | 27 Jun 1993 | Prague, Central Bohemian Region, Czech Republic | |
| 3 | Win | 3–0 | Vyacheslav Materinsky | KO | 2 | 25 Apr 1993 | Tolyatti, Samara Oblast, Russia | |
| 2 | Win | 2–0 | Yuri Kirilin | PTS | 6 | 12 Dec 1992 | Belgorod, Belgorod Oblast, Russia | |
| 1 | Win | 1–0 | Jose Ignacio Barruetabeña | PTS | 6 | 19 Mar 1992 | Oviedo, Asturias, Spain | |
