= Buttimer =

Buttimer is a surname. Notable people with the surname include:

- Anne Buttimer (1938–2017), Irish geographer
- Anthony Buttimer (born 1965), Irish soccer referee
- Beth Buttimer (born 2005), Irish rugby union player
- Jerry Buttimer (born 1967), Irish politician
- Jim Buttimer (1909–1962), Irish hurler, coach and selector
- Paul Buttimer (born 1966), Irish boxer
