= Maselino =

Maselino is a Samoan given name. Notable people with the surname include:

- Maselino Masoe (born 1966), Samoan former boxer
- Maselino Paulino (born 1988), Samoan rugby union player
- Maselino Tuifao (born 1970), Samoan boxer
