= Pál Lakatos =

Hungarian boxer (born 1968)

Personal information
- Full name: Lakatos Pál
- Nationality: Hungary
- Born: 7 June 1968 (age 58) Vásárosnamény, Szabolcs-Szatmár
- Height: 1.62 m (5 ft 4 in)
- Weight: 48 kg (106 lb)

Sport
- Sport: Boxing
- Weight class: Light Flyweight
- Club: Vasas, Budapest
Medal record
European Amateur Championships
Silver medal – second place	1993 Bursa	Light Flyweight
Bronze medal – third place	1991 Gothenburg	Light Flyweight
Bronze medal – third place	1998 Minsk	Light Flyweight
Bronze medal – third place	2000 Tampere	Light Flyweight

Pál Lakatos (born 7 June 1968 in Vásárosnamény) is a retired boxer from Hungary, who represented his native country at two Summer Olympics: in 1992 (Barcelona, Spain) and 2000 (Sydney, Australia). He once won the silver medal at the European Championships, in 1993 (Bursa, Turkey), and thrice captured the bronze medal in the Light Flyweight (– 48 kg) at the European Championships, in 1991, 1998 and 2000.

== Amateur Highlights ==
- Silver medalist at the European Championships in Light Flyweights, in 1993, Bursa, Turkey
- Three-times bronze medalist at the European Championships in 1991, 1998 and 2000
- Member of the Hungarian Olympic Team of Barcelona in Light Flyweights
- Member of the Hungarian Olympic Team of Sydney in Light Flyweights
- 13x Hungarian champion
- 1992 Olympic Results - Boxed as a Light Flyweights (48 kg)
  - 1st Round - Defeated Vladimir Ganzcenko of Unified Team URS, RSC-2
  - Round of 16 - Defeated Dong-Bum Cho of South Korea, 20–15
  - Quarterfinals - Lost to Daniel Petrov of Bulgaria, 8–17
- 2000 Olympic Results - Boxed as a Light Flyweights (48 kg)
  - 1st Round - bye
  - Round of 16 - Lost to Kim Un-Chol of North Korea, 8–20

== Pro career ==
In 2001 Lakatos became a pro. A year later he fought for the TWBA Super Flyweight Title in Torredembarra, but was beaten by Algeria-born Lahcene Zemmouri from Spain. He ended his professional career in 2004, with a negative record: five wins (three knock-outs), eleven losses and two draws.
