= Raúl González (boxer) =

Cuban boxer (born 1967)

Personal information
- Born: June 5, 1967 (age 59)
Medal record
Men's Boxing
Representing Cuba
Olympic Games
Silver medal – second place	1992 Barcelona	Flyweight
World Amateur Championships
Bronze medal – third place	1995 Berlin	Flyweight
Pan American Games
Silver medal – second place	1995 Mar del Plata	Flyweight

Raúl González Sánchez (born June 5, 1967) is a boxer from Cuba, who won the silver medal in the Men's Flyweight Division (– 51 kg) at the 1992 Summer Olympics in Barcelona. In the final he lost to North Korea's Choi Chol-Su. Three years later, at the 1995 World Amateur Boxing Championships in Berlin, he captured the bronze medal in his weight division.

== Career ==
U.S. boxer Rudolph Bradley said his first thought when Raúl González put him down was, "Man, he's strong. I knew the Cubans were strong but I didn't think he could put me down. Yeah, I was in trouble, but I was boxing and moving, trying to get my head back. I've never been stopped, I've been hit hard hundreds of times in Army fights."

== Olympic results ==
- Defeated Leszek Olszewski (Poland) 15-7
- Defeated Moses Malagu (Nigeria) RSC 2 (0:23)
- Defeated David Serradas (Venezuela) 14-7
- Defeated Tim Austin (United States) RSC 1 (1:04)
- Lost to Choi Chol-Su (North Korea) 2-12
