= Giovanni Pretorius =

South African boxer (1972–2021)

Personal information
- Nationality: South African
- Born: 1 January 1972; Transvaal, South Africa
- Died: 23 August 2021 (aged 49); Alberton, South Africa
- Height: 170 cm (5 ft 7 in)
- Weight: 67 kg (148 lb)

Sport
- Country: South Africa
- Sport: Boxing

Giovanni Pretorius (1 January 1972 – 23 August 2021) was a South African Olympic boxer.

== Biography ==
He represented his country in the welterweight division at the 1992 Summer Olympics. He lost his first bout against Sören Antman.

Pretorious died on 23 August 2021, in Alberton, after contracting COVID-19. He was 49.
