= Moses Malagu =

Nigerian boxer (born 1972)

Personal information
- Nationality: Nigerian
- Born: 2 November 1972 (age 53) Nigeria
- Height: 140 cm (4 ft 7 in)
- Weight: 51 kg (112 lb)

Sport
- Country: Nigeria
- Sport: Boxing

Moses Malagu is a Nigerian Olympic boxer. He represented his country in the flyweight division at the 1992 Summer Olympics. He won his first bout against Paul Buttimer, and then lost his second bout to Raúl González.
