= Mario Loch =

German boxer

Personal information
- Nationality: German
- Born: 30 December 1969 (age 55); Räckelwitz, East Germany
- Height: 164 cm (5 ft 5 in)
- Weight: 53 kg (117 lb)

Sport
- Country: Germany
- Sport: Boxing

Mario Loch is a German Olympic boxer. He represented his country in the flyweight division at the 1992 Summer Olympics. He won his first bout against Vichairachanon Khadpo, and then lost his second bout to David Serradas.
