= Arkhom Chenglai =

Thai professional Muay Thai fighter and amateur boxer

Issara Sakgreerin
- Born: Arkhom Chenglai; June 11, 1970 (age 56); Na Tham Tai, Mueang Trang, Trang, Thailand
- Native name: อาคม เฉ่งไล่
- Division: Lightweight; Welterweight
- Style: Muay Thai (Muay Mat); Boxing

Arkhom Chenglai (Thai: อาคม เฉ่งไล่; born June 11, 1970), known professionally as Issara Sakgreerin (Thai: อิสระ ศักดิ์กรีรินทร์), is a Thai former professional Muay Thai fighter and amateur boxer. He is a former Lumpinee Stadium Lightweight Champion and won a bronze medal in boxing at the 1992 Summer Olympics at Welterweight.

== Life and career ==
Arkhom Chenglai was born on June 11, 1970, in Na Tham Tai Subdistrict, Mueang Trang District, Trang Province, Thailand. He initially played football, but one day, while sheltering from the rain at a Muay Thai gym, he saw his brother training—and that moment sparked his interest in the sport. He started to compete under the ring name "Issara Kiattinseedam" (อิสระ เกียรติอินทรีดำ).

Arkhom went on to fight many renowned opponents, including Nokweed Devy. He earned purses as high as 120,000 baht, notably in a bout against Dutch fighter Ramon Dekkers at Lumpinee Stadium on November 11, 1990.

He dominated the Muay Thai scene to the point where few contenders were deemed worthy of facing him. As a result, he transitioned to amateur boxing, where he achieved national acclaim by winning several prestigious titles. He eventually joined the Thai national team and represented the country at the 1992 Summer Olympics in Barcelona, Spain, where he won a bronze medal.

He graduated from Wichienmatu School and earned a bachelor's degree from Chandrakasem Rajabhat College (now Chandrakasem Rajabhat University).

Following his retirement from boxing, Arkhom opened a restaurant in his native Trang Province.

== Title and accomplishments ==
Muay Thai

- Lumpinee Stadium
  - 1990 Lumpinee Stadium Lightweight (135 lbs) Champion

Boxing

- Asian Amateur Boxing Championships
  - 1992 Asian Amateur Boxing Championships Bronze Medalist at Welterweight (-67 kg)
- Olympic Games
  - 1992 Olympic Bronze Medalist at Welterweight (-67 kg)
- Asian Games
  - 1994 Asian Games Silver Medalist at Welterweight (-67 kg)

== Olympic results ==
- Defeated Yusef Khateri (Iran) 13-7
- Defeated Nicodemus Odore (Kenya) 13-10
- Defeated Vitalijus Karpaciauskas (Lithuania) 9-6
- Lost to Michael Carruth (Ireland) 4-11

== Muay Thai Record ==
Muay Thai record (incomplete)
Date	Result	Opponent	Event	Location	Method	Round	Time
1991-07-01	Win	(Thailand) Kiatdisak Nungmuengmaha		Thailand	Decision	5	3:00
1991-05-24	Win	(Thailand) Nokweed Devy	K-LEAGUE KENZAN	Tokyo, Japan	Decision	5	3:00
1991-02-15	Win	(Thailand) Nokweed Devy	Muangchai Kittikasem vs Sot Chitalada	Ayutthaya Province, Thailand	Decision	5	3:00
1990-11-27	Win	(Netherlands) Ramon Dekkers	Lumpinee Stadium	Bangkok, Thailand	Decision (Unanimous)	5	3:00
Defends the Lumpinee Stadium Lightweight (135 lbs) title.
1990-08-18	Win	(Thailand) Thantawanoi Tor.Silachai	Lumpinee Stadium	Bangkok, Thailand	Decision	5	3:00
Wins the vacant Lumpinee Stadium Lightweight (135 lbs) title.
1990-04-28	Win	(Thailand) Pairot Sor.Prantalay	Lumpinee Stadium	Bangkok, Thailand	Decision	5	3:00
1990-04-01	Win	(Thailand) Pairot Sor.Prantalay	Lumpinee Stadium	Bangkok, Thailand	Decision	5	3:00
1990-03-11	Win	(Thailand) Orono Tang	Lumpinee Stadium	Bangkok, Thailand	Decision	5	3:00
1989-10-03	Win	(Thailand) Petchan Sor.Tassanee	Lumpinee Stadium	Bangkok, Thailand	Decision	5	3:00
1989-07-19	Win	(Thailand) Sanfet Chernyim	Lumpinee Stadium	Bangkok, Thailand	Decision	5	3:00
1989-06-12	Win	(Thailand) Petchan Sor.Tassanee	Lumpinee Stadium	Bangkok, Thailand	Decision	5	3:00
1989-05-10	Win	(Thailand) Petchan Sor.Tassanee	Lumpinee Stadium	Bangkok, Thailand	Decision	5	3:00
1989-05-01	Win	(Thailand) Sanfet Chernyim	Lumpinee Stadium	Bangkok, Thailand	Decision	5	3:00
1988-12-12	Win	(Thailand) Petchan Sor.Thepthong	Lumpinee Stadium	Bangkok, Thailand	Decision	5	3:00
Legend: Win Loss Draw/No contest Notes
