= Han Gwang-hyeong =

South Korean boxer (born 1966)

Personal information
- Native name: 한광형
- Nationality: South Korean
- Born: 18 May 1966 (age 58)

Sport
- Sport: Boxing

Han Gwang-hyeong (Korean: 한광형; born 18 May 1966) or Han Kwang-hyung is a South Korean boxer. He competed in the men's flyweight event at the 1992 Summer Olympics.
