= Khela Fana Thwala =

South African boxer

Personal information
- Nationality: South African
- Born: 11 March 1970 (age 55)

Sport
- Sport: Boxing

Khela Fana Thwala (born 11 March 1970) is a South African boxer. He competed in the men's light flyweight event at the 1992 Summer Olympics.
