= Tadahiro Sasaki =

Japanese boxer (born 1970)

Tadahiro Sasaki (佐々木 忠広, Sasaki Tadahiro) (born June 22, 1970, in Niigata) is a retired boxer from Japan, who competed for his native country at the 1992 Summer Olympics in Barcelona, Spain.

== Olympic boxing career ==
Japan sent four boxers to the Barcelona Games. Sasaki competed in the Men's Light Flyweight (– 48 kg) division. He defeated Canada's Domenic Figliomeni in the first round on points (5:3) before falling to Romania's Valentin Barbu (7:10) in the second round.
