= Francisco Moniz =

Angolan boxer (1966–2020)

Francisco André Moniz
Personal information
- Nationality: Angolan
- Born: 12 June 1966; Angola
- Died: 18 June 2020 (aged 54); Luanda, Angola
- Height: 179 cm (5 ft 10 in)
- Weight: 67 kg (148 lb)

Sport
- Country: Angola
- Sport: Boxing

Francisco André Moniz (12 June 1966 – 18 June 2020) was an Angolan Olympic boxer. He represented his country in the welterweight division at the 1992 Summer Olympics. He lost his first bout against Stefan Scriggins. Moniz studied physical education and sports in Cuba and later worked as a trained and physical education teacher.
