= Richard Torres =

Peruvian actor and activist

Richard Torres is a Peruvian actor and activist who advocates against deforestation and climate change by marrying trees.

Torres married his first tree in June 2013 in Peru. In November 2013, he married another, named Aliehuen Nehuen, in Buenos Aires, Argentina. The wedding included wearing a white suit, giving offerings to the tree and kissing it. In November 2014, Torres married a tree in Bogotá, Colombia, and encouraged the Revolutionary Armed Forces of Colombia to plant trees instead of waging war. In August 2018, Torres married a tree in Santo Domingo, Dominican Republic. In May 2022, Torres married a tree near the Eiffel Tower in Paris. That month, Torres also married a tree in Cinquantenaire, a park in Brussels, Belgium.

Torres has said that he intends to be recognised by the Guinness World Records for his marriages. Torres's non-profit, Corazones Verdes Mundial (World of Green Hearts), helps to replant trees.

In 2012, Torres held a protest against the removal of trees in a park in Peru, in which he was nude. He was arrested as a result.

== See also ==
- Chipko movement
- Tree marriage
