= Luiz Freitas =

Brazilian boxer (born 1967)

Personal information
- Nationality: Brazilian
- Born: 3 August 1967 (age 59) Salvador, Bahia, Brazil

Sport
- Sport: Boxing
Medal record
Representing Brazil
Pan American Games
Bronze medal – third place	1991 Havana	Flyweight

Luiz Cláudio de Freitas (born 3 August 1967) is a Brazilian boxer. He competed in the men's flyweight event at the 1992 Summer Olympics. He held a 20–2–0 record in professional boxing (16 KOs).
