= O Song-chol =

North Korean boxer

Personal information
- Nationality: North Korean
- Born: 24 August 1970 (age 55) North Korea
- Height: 168 cm (5 ft 6 in)
- Weight: 48 kg (106 lb)

Korean name
- Hangul: 오성철
- RR: O Seongcheol
- MR: O Sŏngch'ŏl

Sport
- Country: North Korea
- Sport: Boxing
Medal record
Men's boxing
Representing North Korea
Asian Amateur Boxing Championships
Silver medal – second place	1992 Bangkok	Light Flyweight

O Song-chol is a North Korean Olympic boxer. He represented his country in the light-flyweight division at the 1992 Summer Olympics. He won his first bout against Anicet Rasoanaivo, and then lost his second bout to Daniel Petrov.
