= José Guzmán (boxer) =

Venezuelan boxer (born 1963)

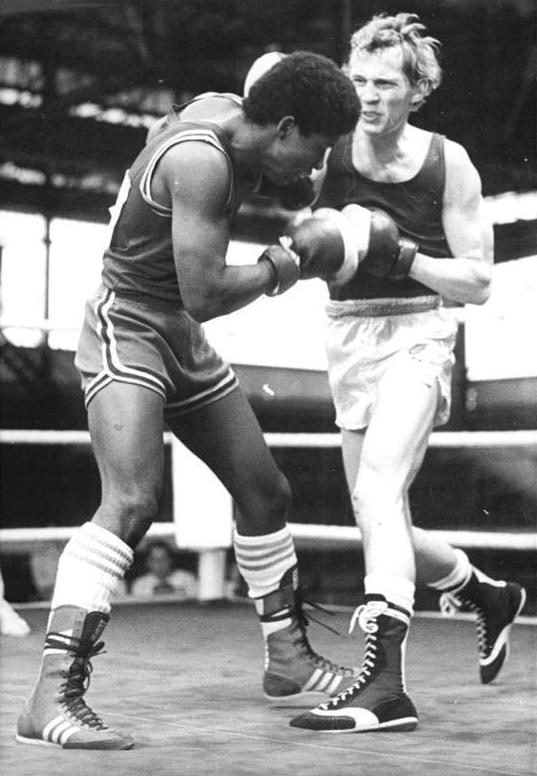
- José Guzmán fighting East Germany's Andreas Otto

Personal information
- Born: March 5, 1963 (age 63)
Medal record
Men's Boxing
Representing Venezuela
Pan American Games
Bronze medal – third place	1991 Havana	Welterweight
Central American and Caribbean Games
Bronze medal – third place	1990 Mexico City	Welterweight

José de la Cruz Guzmán (born March 5, 1963) is a Venezuelan former professional boxer who competed in the welterweight division.

Guzmán earned the bronze medal for Venezuela at the 1991 Pan American Games in Havana. He went on to represent Venezuela at the 1992 Summer Olympics in Barcelona, where he was defeated in the first round by Nick Odore of Kenya.
