= Volodymyr Hanchenko =

Soviet boxer

Personal information
- Nationality: Soviet
- Born: 7 February 1971 (age 54)

Sport
- Sport: Boxing

Volodymyr Hanchenko (born 7 February 1971) is a Soviet boxer. He competed in the men's light flyweight event at the 1992 Summer Olympics.
