= Khyber Shah =

Pakistani boxer (born 1965)

Personal information
- Nationality: Pakistani
- Born: 1 April 1965 (age 59)

Sport
- Sport: Boxing

Khyber Shah (born 1 April 1965) is a Pakistani boxer. He competed in the men's welterweight event at the 1992 Summer Olympics.
