= Yousef Khateri =

Iranian boxer

Personal information
- Full name: Yousef Khateri
- Nationality: Iranian
- Born: December 16, 1971

Sport
- Sport: Boxing
Medal record
Asian Championships
Bronze medal – third place	1992 Bangkok	67 kg

Yousef Khateri (Persian: یوسف خاطری; born 16 December 1971) was an amateur boxer from Iran, who competed in the 1992 Summer Olympics in the welterweight (67 kg) division and lost in the first round to Arkhom Chenglai of Thailand.
