= César Ramos (boxer) =

Dominican Republic boxer (born 1971)

Personal information
- Full name: César Augusto Ramos Robles
- Nationality: Dominican
- Born: 2 July 1971 (age 53)

Sport
- Sport: Boxing

César Augusto Ramos Robles (born 2 July 1971) is a Dominican Republic boxer. He competed in the men's welterweight event at the 1992 Summer Olympics. The Welter Weight division saw César Augusto Ramos Robles required to meet an upper weight limit of 67 kilograms.
