= Pepe Reilly =

American boxer

Personal information
- Nationality: American
- Born: August 19, 1971 (age 54) Los Angeles, California, United States

Sport
- Sport: Boxing

Pepe Reilly (born August 19, 1971) is an American boxer. He competed in the men's welterweight event at the 1992 Summer Olympics.
