= Alex Baba =

Ghanaian boxer

Personal information
- Full name: Alexander Baba
- Nationality: Ghanaian
- Born: 6 July 1970 (age 54); Accra, Ghana

Sport
- Sport: Boxing

Alexander Baba (born 6 July 1970) is a Ghanaian former professional boxer who competed from 1993 to 2009, winning the African flyweight title in 1995 and challenging for the WBC flyweight title in 2001. As an amateur, he competed in the men's flyweight event at the 1992 Summer Olympics.
