= Marty O'Donnell (boxer) =

Canadian boxer

Marty O'Donnell (born February 5, 1973, in Glace Bay, Nova Scotia) is a retired boxer, who represented Canada at the 1992 Summer Olympics in Barcelona, Spain. At the Olympics, O'Donnell was defeated in the first round of the flyweight division (– 51 kg) by Australia's Robbie Peden

== 1992 Olympic results ==
Below is the record of Marty O'Donnell, a Canadian flyweight boxer who competed at the 1992 Barcelona Olympics:

- Round of 32: Lost to Robbie Peden (Australia) on points, 2-14
