= Wiesław Małyszko =

Polish boxer

Personal information
- Nationality: Polish
- Born: 7 December 1970 (age 54); Radziechowy, Poland

Sport
- Sport: Boxing

Wiesław Małyszko (born 7 December 1970) is a Polish boxer. He competed in the men's welterweight event at the 1992 Summer Olympics.
