= Tajudeen Sabitu =

Nigerian boxer

Personal information
- Nationality: Nigerian
- Born: 24 October 1964 (age 60)

Sport
- Sport: Boxing

Tajudeen Sabitu (born 24 October 1964) is a Nigerian boxer. He competed in the men's welterweight event at the 1992 Summer Olympics.
