= Mohamed Haioun =

Algerian boxer (born 1969)

Personal information
- Nationality: Algerian
- Born: 27 March 1969 (age 56)

Sport
- Sport: Boxing

Mohamed Haioun (born 27 March 1969) is an Algerian boxer. He competed in the men's light flyweight event at the 1992 Summer Olympics.
