= Erdenotsogtyn Tsogtjargal =

Mongolian boxer

Erdenetsogtyn Tsogtjargal
Personal information
- Native name: Эрдэнэцогтын Цогтжаргал
- Nationality: Mongolia
- Born: 5 October 1971 (age 54) Mongolia
- Height: 160 cm (5 ft 3 in)

Sport
- Country: Mongolia
- Sport: Boxing
- Weight class: 48 kg

Achievements and titles
- Olympic finals: 9th (1992)
- World finals: (bronze) (1993)
- Regional finals: (bronze) (1989)
Medal record
Men's amateur boxing
Representing Mongolia
World Championships
Bronze medal – third place	1993 Tampere	Light Flyweight
Asian Championships
Bronze medal – third place	1989 Beijing	Light Flyweight

Erdenetsogtyn Tsogtjargal (Mongolian: Эрдэнэцогтын Цогтжаргал; born 5 October 1971) is a Mongolian Olympic boxer. He represented his country in the light-flyweight division at the 1992 Summer Olympics. He won his first bout against Fernando Retayud, and then lost his second bout to Rogelio Marcelo.
