= Shooting at the 2013 SEA Games – Men's 50 metre rifle prone =

The Men's 10 metre air pistol event at the 2013 SEA Games took place on 11 December 2013 at the North Dagon Shooting Range in Yangon, Myanmar.

The event consisted of two rounds: a qualifier and a final. In the qualifier, each shooter fired 60 shots with a .22 Long Rifle at 50 metres distance from the prone position at 10 metres distance. Scores for each shot were in increments of 0.1, with a maximum score of 10.9.

The top 8 shooters in the qualifying round moved on to the final round. The final consisted of 2 strings of 3 shots, after which for every two additional shots, the lowest scoring finalist was dropped. This continued until only two finalists remained to make the final two shots for the gold. The Final two shooters would have totalled 20 shots. These shots scored in increments of 0.1, with a maximum score of 10.9.

== Schedule ==
All times are Myanmar Standard Time (UTC+06:30)

Date	Time	Event
Wednesday, 11 December 2013	09:00	Qualification
Wednesday, 11 December 2013	11:30	Final

== Qualification round ==
Rank	Athlete	Country	1	2	3	4	5	6	Total	Notes
1	Attapon Uea Aree	Thailand	103.6	101.1	102.7	103.2	104.3	103.2	618.1	Q
2	Sahurun	Indonesia	101.5	105.3	101.7	102.7	102.1	102.2	615.5	Q
3	Ling Aung	Myanmar	101.7	100.6	103.1	103.8	101.9	103.8	614.9	Q
4	Aung Thuya	Myanmar	101.8	102.0	102.2	101.4	104.0	103.2	614.6	Q
5	Lim Wen Yi Abel	Singapore	100.5	102.4	101.9	105.0	101.2	103.3	614.3	Q
6	Nguyen Thanh Dat	Vietnam	101.7	102.8	101.3	102.3	102.9	103.2	614.2	Q
7	Napis Tortungpanich	Thailand	102.9	101.5	101.5	103.8	101.1	101.4	612.2	Q
8	Nguyen Duy Hoang	Vietnam	101.7	101.0	101.5	101.5	103.2	102.9	611.8	Q
9	Phung Le Huyen	Vietnam	101.9	101.6	102.6	101.1	102.4	102.0	611.6	
10	Tavarit Majcharcheep	Thailand	99.6	100.8	102.2	103.6	102.7	101.8	610.7	
11	Jayson Valdez	Philippines	101.0	101.5	101.5	102.3	102.4	101.7	610.4	
12	Ong Jun Hong	Singapore	100.4	101.1	103.3	101.8	100.1	101.5	608.2	
13	Mohamad Lutfi Othman	Malaysia	100.5	99.9	100.9	102.7	102.0	101.5	607.5	
14	Benny Cagurin	Philippines	102.0	97.7	102.5	100.7	102.8	101.6	607.3	
15	Muhammad Ezuan Nasir Khan	Malaysia	100.3	101.3	101.7	101.4	100.7	101.2	606.6	
16	Nik Muhammad Aimullah Supardi	Malaysia	100.1	98.5	101.9	102.6	102.5	101.0	606.6	
17	Rahmad Wisnuaji	Indonesia	101.7	101.4	100.9	101.0	101.2	99.8	606.0	
18	Parn Douangpaseuth	Laos	98.6	101.6	101.0	103.0	101.0	100.7	605.9	
19	Wai Yan Min Thu	Myanmar	100.5	100.8	99.5	101.7	101.2	101.9	605.6	
20	Kasmijan Bin Kimin	Singapore	96.1	102.7	100.8	101.6	101.6	101.5	604.3	
21	I Kadek Bagiartha	Indonesia	97.6	101.3	98.6	99.6	102.5	100.8	600.4	
22	Outhoone Keopaseuth	Laos	100.3	98.6	97.1	100.6	99.4	97.2	593.2	
23	Salavaphouma Sisane	Laos	100.2	95.5	98.4	99.2	100.4	99.1	592.8	
24	Emerito Concepcion	Philippines	95.4	98.8	99.6	100.6	98.2	99.1	591.7	

== Final ==
Rank	Athlete	1st Comp.Stage		2nd Competition Stage - Elimination							Total	Notes
1st place, gold medalist(s)	Nguyen Thanh Dat (VIE)	29.9	59.5	79.6	100.1	121.3	140.8	160.9	181.0		201.3	
1st place, gold medalist(s)	Nguyen Thanh Dat (VIE)	9.5	10.6	10.0	10.1	10.7	9.7	10.1	10.2	10.5	201.3	
1st place, gold medalist(s)	Nguyen Thanh Dat (VIE)	10.4	9.5	10.1	10.4	10.5	9.8	10.0	9.9	9.8	201.3	
1st place, gold medalist(s)	Nguyen Thanh Dat (VIE)	10.0	9.5								201.3	
2nd place, silver medalist(s)	Napis Tortungpanich (THA)	30.3	60.4	80.5	100.9	120.8	140.8	160.6	180.7		200.0	
2nd place, silver medalist(s)	Napis Tortungpanich (THA)	10.6	9.7	10.2	10.0	10.5	9.8	9.5	9.9	9.9	200.0	
2nd place, silver medalist(s)	Napis Tortungpanich (THA)	9.9	10.3	9.9	10.4	9.4	10.2	10.3	10.2	9.4	200.0	
2nd place, silver medalist(s)	Napis Tortungpanich (THA)	9.8	10.1								200.0	
3rd place, bronze medalist(s)	Lim Wen Yi Abel (SIN)	29.7	59.4	79.5	100.1	120.8	141.3	160.8			180.3	
3rd place, bronze medalist(s)	Lim Wen Yi Abel (SIN)	9.6	10.2	10.2	10.1	10.3	10.5	10.5	10.0		180.3	
3rd place, bronze medalist(s)	Lim Wen Yi Abel (SIN)	9.9	10.2	9.9	10.5	10.4	10.0	9.0	9.5		180.3	
3rd place, bronze medalist(s)	Lim Wen Yi Abel (SIN)	10.2	9.3								180.3	
4	Attapon Uea Aree (THA)	31.1	61.1	81.3	101.1	120.8	141.3				160.5	
4	Attapon Uea Aree (THA)	10.6	10.3	10.4	10.3	10.0	10.2	9.3			160.5	
4	Attapon Uea Aree (THA)	10.2	10.1	9.8	9.5	9.7	10.3	9.9			160.5	
4	Attapon Uea Aree (THA)	10.3	9.6								160.5	
5	Nguyen Duy Hoang (VIE)	31.1	60.8	81.0	101.3	120.5					139.4	
5	Nguyen Duy Hoang (VIE)	10.4	10.1	10.2	10.1	10.4	9.7				139.4	
5	Nguyen Duy Hoang (VIE)	10.2	10.6	10.0	10.2	8.8	9.2				139.4	
5	Nguyen Duy Hoang (VIE)	10.5	9.0								139.4	
6	Aung Thuya (MYA)	29.3	59.1	79.5	99.7						119.5	
6	Aung Thuya (MYA)	9.5	9.4	10.5	10.0	9.4					119.5	
6	Aung Thuya (MYA)	9.5	10.3	9.9	10.2	10.4					119.5	
6	Aung Thuya (MYA)	10.3	10.1								119.5	
7	Sahurun (INA)	29.8	60.2	80.0							99.5	
7	Sahurun (INA)	10.3	9.7	9.6	9.2						99.5	
7	Sahurun (INA)	10.0	10.2	10.2	10.3						99.5	
7	Sahurun (INA)	9.5	10.5								99.5	
8	Ling Aung (MYA)	29.4	59.6								78.8	
8	Ling Aung (MYA)	9.5	10.0	9.9							78.8	
8	Ling Aung (MYA)	9.6	10.2	9.3							78.8	
8	Ling Aung (MYA)	10.3	10.0								78.8	
