= Rowan Williams (boxer) =

English boxer (born 1968)

Personal information
- Nationality: British
- Born: Rowan Anthony Williams; 18 March 1968 (age 58) Birmingham, Westmidlands, England
- Height: 5 ft 5 in (165 cm)
- Weight: Bantamweight

Boxing career

Boxing record
- Total fights: 18
- Wins: 5
- Win by KO: 1
- Losses: 12
- Draws: 1

Rowan Anthony Williams (born 18 March 1968 in Birmingham) is a retired English boxer who competed in the flyweight division (– 48 kg). He represented Great Britain at the 1992 Summer Olympics in Barcelona, Spain. There he was defeated in the quarterfinals by Roel Velasco of the Philippines.
