= Yuliyan Strogov =

Bulgarian boxer

Personal information
- Born: March 28, 1972 (age 54)
Medal record
Men's Boxing
Representing Bulgaria
World Amateur Championships
Bronze medal – third place	1991 Sydney	Flyweight
European Amateur Championships
Silver medal – second place	1996 Vejle	Flyweight

Yuliyan Mikhaylov Strogov (Bulgarian: Юлиян Михайлов Строгов; born March 28, 1972) is a boxer from Bulgaria. He was born in Dobrich. At the 1992 Summer Olympics he was stopped in the second round of the Men's Flyweight (51 kg) division by eventual bronze medalist Timothy Austin of the United States. At the 1996 Summer Olympics in the Men's Flyweight division, he was stopped in the first round by Ireland's Damaen Kelly. Strogov had won a silver medal in the same division earlier the same year, at the 1996 European Amateur Boxing Championships in Vejle.
