= Stanislav Vagaský =

Slovak boxer

Personal information
- Nationality: Slovak
- Born: 16 August 1974 (age 50); Vranov nad Topľou, Czechoslovakia

Sport
- Sport: Boxing

Stanislav Vagaský (born 16 August 1974) is a Slovak boxer. He competed in the men's flyweight event at the 1992 Summer Olympics.
