= Stephen Ahialey =

Ghanaian boxer

Personal information
- Nationality: Ghana
- Born: 8 January 1970 (age 55) Accra, Ghana

Sport
- Sport: Boxing

Stephen Dotse Koblah Ahialey (Note: Also known as Steve Dotse.) (born 8 January 1970) is a Ghanaian boxer. He competed in the 1992 Summer Olympics.
