= Isidro Vicera =

Filipino boxer

Personal information
- Nationality: Filipino
- Born: March 30, 1970 (age 56) Bago, Negros Occidental, Philippines
- Height: 5 ft 5 in (165 cm)
- Weight: 112 lb (51 kg)

Sport
- Sport: Boxing
- Weight class: Flyweight
Medal record
Men's Boxing
Representing the Philippines
SEA Games
Gold medal – first place	1989 Kuala Lumpur	Flyweight
Gold medal – first place	1991 Manila	Flyweight

Isidro Vicera Jr. (Note: sometimes written as Isidro J.R. Vicera) (born March 30, 1970) is a Filipino boxer. He competed in the men's flyweight event at the 1992 Summer Olympics.

He comes from a family of boxers. His brother Virgilio also competed in the 1996 Summer Olympics

Isidro Vicera has also competed in the SEA Games, winning a gold medal at the 1989 edition in the flyweight division. In the 1991 SEA Games, he failed to defend his title, settling for a silver medal.
