= Mario Romero (Nicaraguan boxer) =

Nicaragua boxer

Marco Antonio Romero is a retired amateur boxer from Nicaragua who competed in the 1992 Summer Olympics at welterweight. In the first round of the 1992 Olympics, Romero defeated Khyber Shah of Pakistan 7:2. In the second round, Romero lost to Andreas Otto by RSCH-2.
