= Fernando Retayud =

Colombian boxer (born 1969)

Personal information
- Born: October 22, 1969 (age 56)
Medal record
Men's Boxing
Representing Colombia
Pan American Games
Bronze medal – third place	1991 Havana	Light Flyweight

Luis Fernando Retayud Zubieta (born October 22, 1969) is a former Colombian boxer, competing in the light-flyweight division. He competed for his native country at the 1992 Summer Olympics in Barcelona, Spain, where he was defeated in the first round of the Men's Light Flyweight (– 48 kg) by Mongolia's Erdenentsogt Tsogtjargal (2:8). A year earlier he captured the bronze medal in the same division at the 1991 Pan American Games.
