= Saïd Ben Najem =

French boxer

Personal information
- Nationality: French
- Born: 21 May 1968 (age 57); Paris, France

Sport
- Sport: Boxing

Saïd Ben Najem (born 21 May 1968) is a French boxer. He competed in the men's welterweight event at the 1992 Summer Olympics and tied 17th.
