= Mohamed Zbir =

Moroccan boxer (born 1965)

Personal information
- Nationality: Moroccan
- Born: 1 November 1965 (age 59)

Sport
- Sport: Boxing

Mohamed Zbir (born 1 November 1965) is a Moroccan boxer. He competed at the 1992 Summer Olympics and the 1996 Summer Olympics. At the 1992 Summer Olympics, he lost to Jan Quast of Germany.
