= Anatoly Filippov =

Russian boxer

Personal information
- Nationality: Russian
- Born: 20 January 1963 (age 62); Ust-Maya, Soviet Union

Sport
- Sport: Boxing

Anatoly Filippov (born 20 January 1963) is a Russian former boxer. He competed in the men's flyweight event at the 1992 Summer Olympics.
