= Masashi Kawakami =

Japanese boxer (born 1972)

Masashi Kawakami (川上 雅史, Kawakami Masashi) (born February 23, 1972, in Tochigi) is a retired boxer from Japan, who competed for his native country at the 1992 Summer Olympics in Barcelona, Spain.

Japan sent four boxers to the Barcelona Games. Kawakami competed in the Men's Welterweight (– 67 kg) division. He was defeated in his first match by Great Britain's Adrian Dodson after the referee stopped the contest in the third round.
