= Aníbal Santiago Acevedo =

Puerto Rican boxer (born 1971)

Aníbal Acevedo
Personal information
- Full name: Aníbal Santiago Acevedo
- Nationality: Puerto Rico
- Born: April 28, 1971 (age 55) San Juan, Puerto Rico
- Height: 1.76 m (5 ft 9 1/2 in)
- Weight: 67 kg (148 lb)

Sport
- Sport: Boxing
- Weight class: Welterweight
Medal record
Olympic Games
Bronze medal – third place	1992 Barcelona	Welterweight
Pan American Games
Bronze medal – third place	1991 Havana	Light Welterweight

Aníbal Santiago Acevedo (born April 28, 1971) is a Puerto Rican boxer, who won a bronze medal in the welterweight division at the 1992 Summer Olympics. A year earlier he won the bronze medal at the Pan American Games in Havana, Cuba.

== Amateur highlights ==
- 1989: Gold Medalist World Junior Championships in San Juan, Puerto Rico (beat Shane Mosley)
- 1991: Bronze Medal Pan Am Games Junior Welterweight
- 1991: Lost to Kostya Tszyu on points in World Championships in Sydney, Australia
- 1992: Gold Medal Santo Domingo Olympic Trials Welterweight (beat Guillermo Jones)
- 1992: Represented Puerto Rico as a welterweight at the Barcelona Olympic games. His results were:
  - Defeated Harry Simon (Namibia) 13–11
  - Defeated Stefan Scriggins (Australia) 16–3
  - Defeated Francisc Vaştag (Romania) 20–9
  - Lost to Juan Hernández Sierra (Cuba) 2–11

== Professional career ==
Acevedo began his professional career in 1993 and has had limited success. In 2006 he lost via TKO to Randy Griffin. In February 2007 he lost by KO against Jarmine Mickey.
