= St. Aubyn Hines =

Jamaican boxer (born 1972)

St. Aubyn Hines (born March 21, 1972) is a retired boxer from Jamaica, who competed for his native country at the 1992 Summer Olympics in Barcelona, Spain.

He competed in the Men's Light-Flyweight (-48kg) division. At the 1992 Games, he was defeated in the first round by Thailand's Phamuansak Phasuwan after the referee stopped the contest in the second round. He also represented Jamaica at the 1994 Commonwealth Games.
