= Ángel Chacón =

Puerto Rican boxer

Personal information
- Nickname: Avispa
- Nationality: Puerto Rican
- Born: Ángel Chacón; January 12, 1973 (age 53) Vega Alta, Puerto Rico
- Height: 5 ft 5 in (165 cm)
- Weight: Lightweight; Super Featherweight; Featherweight; Super Bantamweight

Boxing career
- Reach: 72 in (183 cm)
- Stance: Orthodox

Boxing record
- Total fights: 46
- Wins: 37
- Win by KO: 16
- Losses: 9
- Draws: 0
- No contests: 0

Ángel Chacón (born December 1, 1972) is a Puerto Rican former professional boxer. He's the former WBC FECARBOX super bantamweight, WBC Continental Americas super bantamweight, and IBA former featherweight Champion. The IBA is a minor boxing organization which is generally not considered a world championship organization by fans, experts and boxers alike.

== Amateur career ==
Chacón was born in Vega Alta, Puerto Rico. He had a very good amateur career and represented Puerto Rico at the 1992 Barcelona Olympic Games.

== Professional career ==
=== WBC Super Bantamweight Championship ===
In February 1999, Chacón was knocked out in just two rounds by WBC Super Bantamweight Champion, Érik Morales at the Thomas & Mack Center in Las Vegas, Nevada.

=== IBA Featherweight Championship ===
On October 27, 2002 Chacón upset the American John Michael Johnson to win the IBA Featherweight title. The bout was the main event of ESPN's Friday Night Fights.
