= Leszek Olszewski =

Polish boxer

Personal information
- Nationality: Polish
- Born: 18 March 1969 (age 56); Racibórz, Poland

Sport
- Sport: Boxing

Leszek Olszewski (born 18 March 1969) is a Polish boxer. He competed in the men's flyweight event at the 1992 Summer Olympics.
