= Stefan Scriggins =

Australian boxer

Personal information
- Nationality: Australian
- Born: 17 April 1970 (age 56) Leicester, England
- Height: 188 cm (6 ft 2 in)
- Weight: 67 kg (148 lb)

Sport
- Country: Australia
- Sport: Boxing
Medal record
Boxing
Representing Australia
World Amateur Boxing Championships
Bronze medal – third place	1991 Sydney	Men's Welterweight
Commonwealth Games
Bronze medal – third place	1990 Auckland	Men's Light Welterweight

Stefan Scriggins is an Australian Olympic boxer. He represented his country in the Welterweight division at the 1992 Summer Olympics. He won his first bout against Francisco Moniz, and then lost his second bout to Aníbal Santiago Acevedo.
