= Rogelio Marcelo =

Cuban boxer (born 1965)

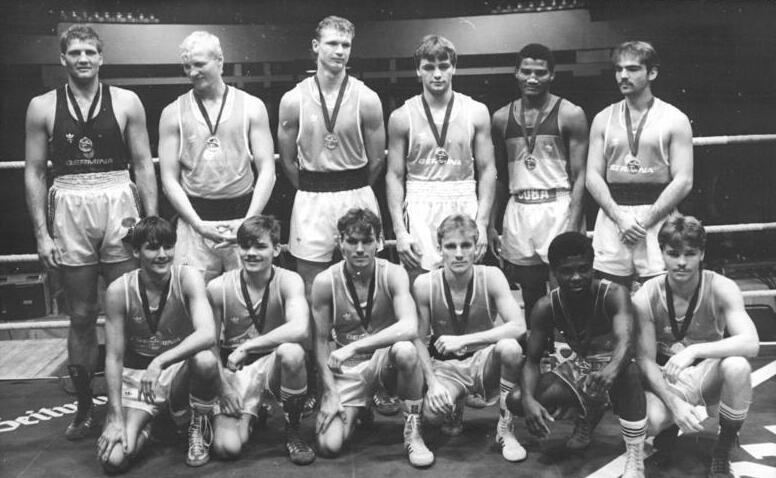
- Rogelio Marcelo (front row, second from right) in 1990

Personal information
- Full name: Rogelio Marcelo García
- Nationality: Cuban
- Born: June 11, 1965 (age 61) Guantánamo
- Height: 1.50 m (4 ft 11 in)
- Weight: 48 kg (106 lb)

Sport
- Sport: Boxing
- Weight class: Light Flyweight
Medal record
Olympic Games
Gold medal – first place	1992 Barcelona	Light Flyweight
World Amateur Championships
Silver medal – second place	1989 Moscow	Light Flyweight
Silver medal – second place	1991 Sydney	Light Flyweight
Pan American Games
Gold medal – first place	1991 Havana	Light Flyweight
Central American and Caribbean Games
Gold medal – first place	1990 Mexico City	Light Flyweight
Silver medal – second place	1986 Santiago	Light Flyweight

Rogelio Marcelo García (born June 11, 1965, in Guantánamo) is a retired boxer from Cuba, who competed in the light flyweight (– 48 kg) division during the early 1990s.

Marcelo lost in 1989 and 1991 at the world championships finals to American winner Eric Griffin but represented his native country at the 1992 Summer Olympics in Barcelona, Spain, where he won the gold medal (Griffin lost to Rafael Lozano 5-6 ). A year earlier, at the Pan Am Games in Havana, Cuba, he had triumphed in the same division.

== Olympic results ==
- Defeated Mfamasibili Mnisi (Swaziland) RSC 3 (0:55)
- Defeated Erdenentsogt Tsogtjargal (Mongolia) 14–2
- Defeated Rafael Lozano (Spain) 11–3
- Defeated Roel Velasco (Philippines) RSC 1 (1:36)
- Defeated Daniel Bojinov (Bulgaria) 24-10
