= Tree marriage =

Symbolic marriage between human and tree

Tree marriage is a form of symbolic proxy marriage between a human and a tree that is said to be infused with supernatural life and may allow a bachelor to become a widower when the tree is felled and thus marry a human widow. Traditionally, Hindus could not marry three times. To avoid this, anyone who had been widowed twice and wanted to look for a new wife had to first celebrate a marriage ceremony with a sahada tree (Streblus asper), which was then cut down. It was once widespread in India among cults which believed trees contain hidden sacred medicine, fertility enhancers or souls of the dead and unborn.

In 2007, the Indian actress and former Miss World winner, Aishwarya Rai, announced that she would marry a tree.

The Inquisitr reported that women in San Jacinto Amilpas were marrying trees to protest logging.
