= Tim Austin (boxer) =

American boxer

Personal information
- Nickname: Cincinnati Kid
- Born: Timothy Austin; April 14, 1971 (age 55) Cincinnati, Ohio, U.S.
- Height: 5 ft 5 1/2 in (166 cm)
- Weight: Bantamweight

Boxing career
- Reach: 71 in (180 cm)
- Stance: Southpaw

Boxing record
- Total fights: 30
- Wins: 27
- Win by KO: 24
- Losses: 2
- Draws: 1
Medal record
Men's Boxing
Representing United States
Olympic Games
Bronze medal – third place	1992 Barcelona	Flyweight

Timothy Austin (born April 14, 1971) is an American former professional boxer. He is now a coach at the Cincinnati Golden Gloves gym in Cincinnati.

== Amateur career ==
Austin had an outstanding amateur career, compiling a record of 113–9.

== Amateur accomplishments ==
- 1990 National Golden Gloves flyweight champion
- 1991 National Golden Gloves flyweight champion
- 1991 United States Amateur flyweight champion
- Representing the United States, Austin won a bronze medal as a flyweight at the 1992 Barcelona Olympics. His results were:
  - 1st round bye
  - Defeated Yuliyan Strogov (Bulgaria) 19-7
  - Defeated Benjamin Mwangata (Tanzania) 19-8
  - Lost to Raúl González (Cuba) RSC 1

== Professional career ==
Known as "Cincinnati Kid", Austin won the IBF Bantamweight title by defeating Mbulelo Botile in 1997. He successfully defended his title against nine fighters before losing to Rafael Marquez by an 8th-round technical knockout in 2003.

== Professional boxing record ==
30 fights	27 wins	2 losses
By knockout	24	2
By decision	3	0
Draws	1	

No.	Result	Record	Opponent	Type	Round, time	Date	Location	Notes
30	Loss	27–2–1	Eric Aiken	TKO	6 (10)	2006-04-01	Wolstein Center, Cleveland, Ohio, U.S.	
29	Win	27–1–1	Julio Coronel	TKO	3 (8)	2005-11-11	Horseshoe Riverdome, Bossier City, Louisiana, U.S.	
28	Win	26–1–1	Reynaldo Hurtado	TKO	5 (8)	2005-09-03	Gund Arena, Cleveland, Ohio, U.S.	
27	Loss	25–1–1	Rafael Márquez	TKO	8 (12)	2003-02-15	Caesars Palace, Paradise, Nevada, U.S.	Lost IBF bantamweight title
26	Win	25–0–1	Adan Vargas	TKO	10 (12)	2002-07-27	Mandalay Bay Events Center, Paradise, Nevada, U.S.	Retained IBF bantamweight title
25	Win	24–0–1	Ratanachai Sor Vorapin	UD	12 (12)	2001-12-15	Foxwoods Resort Casino, Ledyard, Connecticut, U.S.	Retained IBF bantamweight title
24	Win	23–0–1	Steve Dotse	TKO	6 (12)	2001-06-16	Cintas Center, Cincinnati, Ohio, U.S.	Retained IBF bantamweight title
23	Win	22–0–1	Jesús Pérez	TKO	6 (12)	2001-03-03	Mandalay Bay Events Center, Paradise, Nevada, U.S.	Retained IBF bantamweight title
22	Win	21–0–1	Arthur Johnson	UD	12 (12)	2000-08-11	Paris Las Vegas, Paradise, Nevada, U.S.	Retained IBF bantamweight title
21	Win	20–0–1	Bernardo Mendoza	TKO	1 (12)	1999-12-18	Grand Casino, Tunica, Mississippi, U.S.	Retained IBF bantamweight title
20	Win	19–0–1	Sergio Aguila	KO	9 (12)	1999-03-27	Jai Alai Fronton, Miami, Florida, U.S.	Retained IBF bantamweight title
19	Win	18–0–1	Andrian Kaspari	TKO	3 (12)	1998-05-30	Las Vegas Hilton, Winchester, Nevada, U.S.	Retained IBF bantamweight title
18	Win	17–0–1	Paul Lloyd	TKO	2 (12)	1998-03-28	Ice Arena, Hull, England, U.K.	Retained IBF bantamweight title
17	Win	16–0–1	Mbulelo Botile	TKO	8 (12)	1997-07-19	Arena, Nashville, Tennessee, U.S.	Won IBF bantamweight title
16	Win	15–0–1	Miguel Espinoza	KO	1 (?)	1996-02-24	Richmond Coliseum, Richmond, Virginia, U.S.	
15	Win	14–0–1	Kevin Sandlin	KO	1 (?)	1996-01-13	Jai Alai Fronton, Miami, Florida, U.S.	
14	Win	13–0–1	Jose Luis Velarde	KO	1 (?)	1995-12-16	CoreStates Spectrum, Philadelphia, Pennsylvania, U.S.	
13	Win	12–0–1	Eddie Rangel	TKO	1 (10)	1995-08-12	MGM Grand Garden Arena, Paradise, Nevada, U.S.	
12	Win	11–0–1	Javier Díaz	PTS	10 (10)	1995-05-27	Broward County Convention Center, Fort Lauderdale, Florida, U.S.	
11	Draw	10–0–1	Javier Díaz	TD	1 (8)	1995-04-08	Caesars Palace, Paradise, Nevada, U.S.	
10	Win	10–0	Travis Gregory	TKO	3 (8)	1995-03-01	Memorial Auditorium, Fort Lauderdale, Florida, U.S.	
9	Win	9–0	Arturo Estrada	KO	1 (?)	1995-01-03	Memphis, Tennessee, U.S.	
8	Win	8–0	Ramon Gonzales	TKO	1 (8)	1994-09-12	Silver Nugget, North Las Vegas, Nevada, U.S.	
7	Win	7–0	Abselon Briceno	TKO	6 (?)	1994-04-08	Palmer Auditorium, Davenport, Iowa, U.S.	
6	Win	6–0	Antonio Garris	TKO	2 (?)	1994-02-19	Coliseum, Charlotte, North Carolina, U.S.	
5	Win	5–0	German Ruiz	KO	4 (6)	1994-01-29	MGM Grand Garden Arena, Paradise, Nevada, U.S.	
4	Win	4–0	Andres Gonzalez	KO	4 (6)	1993-12-15	Aladdin, Paradise, Nevada, U.S.	
3	Win	3–0	Richard Dinkins	TKO	1 (4)	1993-10-23	Broward County Convention Center, Fort Lauderdale, Florida, U.S.	
2	Win	2–0	Hector Lara	TKO	1 (?)	1993-09-10	Alamodome, San Antonio, Texas, U.S.	
1	Win	1–0	Joey Lopez	KO	1 (4)	1993-04-23	The Pyramid, Memphis, Tennessee, U.S.	

== Legal troubles ==
Austin was accused of assaulting an escort at the U.S olympic boxing team hotel in Sydney, Australia during the 2000 Olympics.

Shortly after the loss to Marquez, Austin was accused, and later acquitted, of raping a 16-year-old girl. With his legal troubles behind him, Austin resumed his career in 2005 but his comeback was quickly derailed when he lost via TKO to journeyman Eric Aiken, who went on to win the IBF featherweight Title.

== See also ==
- List of male boxers
- List of southpaw stance boxers
- List of world bantamweight boxing champions

Sporting positions
Amateur boxing titles
Previous: Sandtanner Lewis	Golden Gloves; Flyweight champion 1990–1991	Next: Aristead Clayton Jr.
Previous: Rudy Bradley	U.S. Flyweight champion 1991	Next: Arturo Hoffman
World boxing titles
Preceded by Mbulelo Botile	IBF bantamweight champion July 19, 1997 – February 15, 2003	Succeeded by Rafael Márquez
