= Robbie Peden =

Australian boxer

Personal information
- Nickname: Bomber
- Nationality: Australian
- Born: 11 November 1973 (age 52) Brisbane, Queensland, Australia
- Height: 1.73 m (5 ft 8 in)
- Weight: 59.05 kg (130 lb)

Boxing career
- Reach: 175 cm (69 in)
- Stance: Orthodox

Boxing record
- Total fights: 29
- Wins: 25
- Win by KO: 14
- Losses: 4
- Draws: 0
Medal record
Men's amateur boxing
Representing Australia
Commonwealth Games
Gold medal – first place	1994 Victoria	Bantamweight

Robert Lloyd Peden (born 11 November 1973) is an Australian former professional boxer who won the vacant IBF super featherweight title in 2005 by beating Nate Campbell by TKO. Peden was the third person of Aboriginal descent to win a world title, joining super middleweight Anthony Mundine (2003) and bantamweight Lionel Rose (1968).

== Background ==
Peden is the son of an Aboriginal mother. His father was of Scottish heritage.

== Amateur career ==
His amateur record was 130–15. He was a five-time national amateur champion, won the 1994 Commonwealth Games and won the 1995 and 1996 Liverpool Cup. He represented Australia at the 1992 and 1996 Olympic Games.

He was a member of the 1992 Australian Olympic team as a flyweight. His results were:

- Defeated Marty O'Donnell (Canada) 14–2
- Defeated Yacin Chikh (Algeria) KO 2
- Lost to Chol-Su Choi (North Korea) 11–25

He was a member of the 1996 Australian Olympic team as a featherweight. His results were:

- Defeated Mohammed Achik (Morocco) 15–7
- Lost to Serafim Todorov (Bulgaria) 8–20

== Professional career ==
Known as "Bomber", Peden turned pro in 1996 and captured the vacant IBF super featherweight title in 2005 with a TKO over Nate Campbell. After the win against Campbell, he took on Marco Antonio Barrera in an attempt to unify the belts and lost his title seven months after winning it. He was inducted into the Australian National Boxing Hall of Fame in 2012.

== Personal life ==
Peden is still involved in boxing, running the Fitzroys Stars Gym in Melbourne, which is housed inside an Aboriginal community centre. Peden, who is of Aboriginal descent, is involved in that community, as CEO of the Indigenous Solutions Aboriginal Corporation, while also working with Melbourne Aboriginal Youth Sport and Recreation and the Victorian Aboriginal Child Care Association.

Sporting positions
Regional boxing titles
Vacant Title last held by Jesús Chávez	NABF Super Featherweight Champion; 5 March 2000 – 25 June 2000	Succeeded by John Brown
Vacant Title last held by David Vasquez	NABF Featherweight Champion; 21 October 2000 – 9 March 2002	Succeeded by Juan Manuel Márquez
World boxing titles
Vacant Title last held by Erik Morales	IBF Super Featherweight Champion; 23 February 2005 – 17 September 2005	Succeeded by Marco Antonio Barrera
