= Maselino Tuifao =

Samoan boxer

Personal information
- Nationality: Samoan
- Born: 22 October 1970 (age 54); Samoa
- Height: 168 cm (5 ft 6 in)
- Weight: 67 kg (148 lb)

Sport
- Country: Samoa
- Sport: Boxing

Maselino Tuifao is a Samoan Olympic boxer. He represented his country in the welterweight division at the 1992 Summer Olympics. He had a bye the first round, and then lost his first bout to Michael Carruth.
