= Héctor Ávila =

Dominican Republic boxer (born 1972)

Medal record
Men's Boxing
Representing the Dominican Republic
Central American and Caribbean Games
Bronze medal – third place	1990 Mexico City	Flyweight

Héctor Julio Ávila (born July 14, 1972, in Santiago de los Caballeros) is a retired boxer from the Dominican Republic.

Ávila competed for his native country at the 1992 Summer Olympics in Barcelona, Spain, where he was stopped in the quarterfinals of the Men's Flyweight (– 51 kg) division by Hungary's eventual bronze medalist István Kovács. He won a bronze medal at the 1990 Central American and Caribbean Games in Mexico City, Mexico.
