= Michael Carruth =

Irish boxer

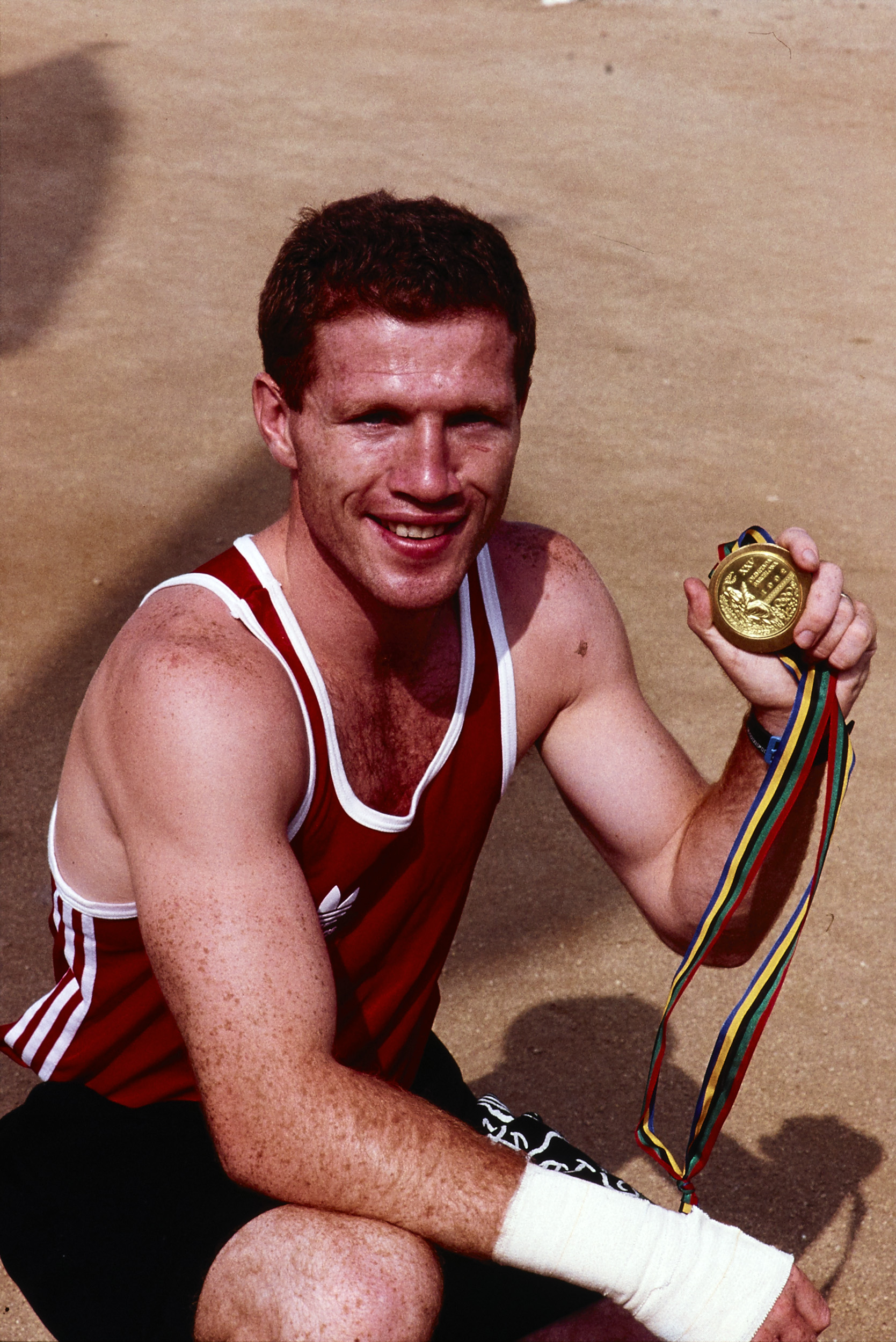
- Carruth holding his Olympic gold medal in 1992

Personal information
- Nationality: Irish
- Born: 9 July 1967 (age 58) Dublin, Ireland
- Height: 1.7 m (5 ft 7 in)

Sport
- Country: Ireland
- Sport: Boxing
- Event(s): Lightweight, welterweight
- Retired: 2000

Achievements and titles
- Olympic finals: 1988, 1992
- World finals: 1989 World Amateur Boxing Championships
Medal record
Representing Ireland
Men's Boxing
Olympic Games
Gold medal – first place	1992 Barcelona	Welterweight
World Amateur Championships
Bronze medal – third place	1989 Moscow	Light Welterweight
- Updated on 29 July 2012

Michael Carruth (born 9 July 1967) is a southpaw Irish Olympic boxer from Dublin. He is best known for winning the welterweight gold medal at the 1992 Summer Olympics in Barcelona. He turned professional in 1994 and retired in 2000.

== Amateur boxing ==
Olympic results

1988 Olympics Lightweight Boxing

- 1st round bye
- Defeated Satoru Higashi (Japan) 5-0
- Lost to George Scott (Sweden) KO by 1

1992 Olympics Welterweight Boxing

- Round of 32: bye
- Round of 16: Defeated Mikaele Masoe (American Samoa) on points, 11-2
- Quarter-final: Defeated Andreas Otto (Germany) on points, 35-22
- Semi-final: Defeated Arkhom Chenglai (Thailand) on points, 11-4
- Final: Defeated Juan Hernández Sierra (Cuba) on points, 13-10.

Carruth's medal was Ireland's first ever gold medal in boxing, only a couple of hours after teammate Wayne McCullough had to settle for the silver in bantamweight. It was also the first Olympic gold medal for Ireland since Ronnie Delaney won the Men's 1500m event at the 1956 Olympic Games in Melbourne.

Within a few days of Carruth winning his Olympic medal the Government of Ireland announced that Carruth has been instantly promoted to sergeant within the Irish Army in recognition of his achievement at the Olympics. And, on the day of his return to Ireland, local pubs dropped the price of beer to that of 1956.

== Professional boxing ==
Carruth turned professional in 1994 after taking leave from his job as a soldier in the Irish Army. He was trained by the former Irish boxing great Steve Collins. He had limited success as a professional, losing in both of his defining professional bouts, in 1997 against Mihai Leu for the WBO Welterweight title and in 2000 against Adrian Stone for the IBO Light Middleweight title. He retired in 2000, after the loss to Stone, with a career professional record of 18-3-0.

== Media ==
In 2006, he competed on the TV series Celebrity Jigs 'n' Reels.

Carruth was an expert boxing analyst for RTÉ's Olympic coverage in 2008, 2012 and 2016.

In 2020, Carruth appeared in the fourth season of the Irish edition of Dancing with the Stars. He and his professional partner, Karen Byrne, were eliminated on 3 February 2020.

== Involvement in Gaelic games ==
During his short spell as senior Westmeath county football team manager, Brendan Hackett appointed Carruth as masseur in 2009.
