= Vitalijus Karpačiauskas =

Lithuanian boxer (born 1966)

Personal information
- Nationality: Lithuanian
- Born: 6 July 1966 (age 59); Panevėžys, Lithuanian SSR, Soviet Union

Sport
- Sport: Boxing

Vitalijus Karpačiauskas (born 6 July 1966) is a Lithuanian boxer. He competed at the 1992 Summer Olympics and the 1996 Summer Olympics.
