= Valentin Barbu =

Romanian boxer

Personal information
- Nationality: Romanian
- Born: 15 May 1969 (age 55)

Sport
- Sport: Boxing

Valentin Barbu (born 15 May 1969) is a Romanian boxer. He competed in the men's light flyweight event at the 1992 Summer Olympics.
