= Benjamin Mwangata =

Tanzanian boxer (born 1966)

Personal information
- Full name: Benjamin Mwangata
- Nationality: Tanzania
- Born: March 11, 1966 (age 60)
- Height: 1.65 m (5 ft 5 in)
- Weight: 51 kg (112 lb)

Sport
- Sport: Boxing
- Weight class: Flyweight

Benjamin Mwangata (born March 11, 1966) is a retired male boxer from Tanzania, who represented his native East African country as a flyweight in two consecutive Summer Olympics, starting in 1988 (Seoul). He also competed at two Commonwealth Games: 1990 and 1998. Mwangata won a silver medal in the flyweight division at the 1987 All-Africa Games, losing in the final to Gemelhu Bezabeh of Ethiopia.
