= Narciso González =

Narciso González Medina
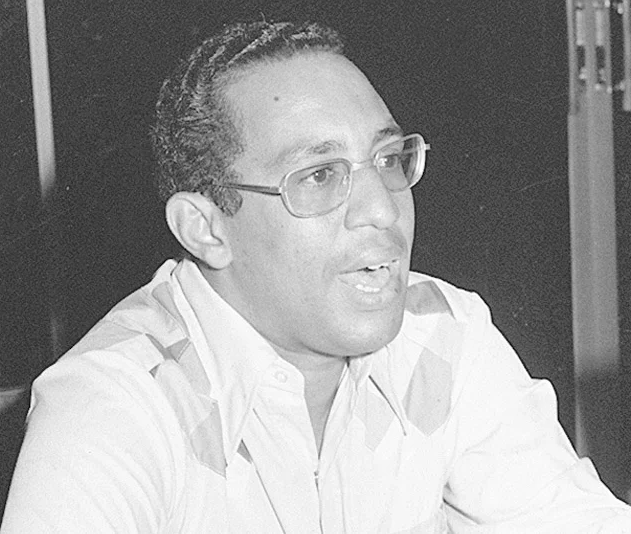
- Narciso González Medina (“Narcisazo”)
- Born: 29 October 1941; Santo Domingo, Dominican Republic
- Died: 26 May 1994 (aged 52)
- Occupations: Lawyer, journalist, playwright, university professor, human rights activist
- Known for: Outspoken criticism of Joaquín Balaguer’s regime; forced disappearance in 1994

Narciso González Medina (October 29, 1941 – disappeared May 26, 1994), known as Narcisazo, was a Dominican lawyer, journalist, playwright, university professor and social activist. He is primarily remembered for his defense of human rights, his critical thinking, and his commitment to freedom of expression. His forced disappearance after criticizing the Joaquín Balaguer government marked a turning point in the contemporary history of the Dominican Republic.

== Childhood and education ==
Narciso González was born in Santo Domingo, Dominican Republic. He studied law at the Autonomous University of Santo Domingo (UASD), where he later served as a professor. From a young age, he demonstrated an interest in literature, theater, and politics, elements that would intertwine throughout his life.

== Professional career ==
=== Teaching and university life ===
He was a professor at the Faculty of Humanities at the UASD (Autonomous University of Santo Domingo), where he taught subjects related to philosophy, ethics, and literature. His critical thinking and close involvement with student movements made him a respected and controversial figure within the academic world.

=== Journalism and public opinion ===
González published opinion columns and political cartoons in independent media. He founded the magazine "La Muralla," where he addressed issues of corruption, state repression, and civil rights. His direct and ironic style earned him both admirers and detractors.

=== Theater and literature ===
He was the author of several plays with social and critical content. He used art as a tool for protest and awareness-raising. Some of his pieces were presented in university and community spaces.

== Activism and political criticism ==
During the 1970s and 1980s, Narcisazo was involved with leftist movements and grassroots organizations. He was an outspoken critic of the authoritarian and repressive practices of Joaquín Balaguer's regime, denouncing human rights violations and the use of force against opponents.

== Disappearance ==
On May 26, 1994, after participating in a meeting at the UASD and having published a strong criticism of the government, Narciso González was last seen. His disappearance sparked a wave of protests in the country and denunciations from international organizations.

Human rights organizations such as Amnesty International, Human Rights Watch, and the Inter-American Commission on Human Rights have demanded an investigation and justice. To date, his case remains unpunished.

== Legacy ==
Narcisazo is considered a symbol of the struggle for freedom of expression and justice in the Dominican Republic. Murals have been erected in his honor, books have been published, and documentaries have been produced. Every May 26, his disappearance is commemorated with cultural and protest activities.

== See also ==
- Human rights in the Dominican Republic
- Enforced disappearances
