= Cho Dong-bum =

Korean male boxer

Personal information
- Nationality: South Korean
- Born: 5 February 1969 (age 56)

Sport
- Sport: Boxing

Cho Dong-bum (born 5 February 1969) is a South Korean boxer. He competed in the men's light flyweight event at the 1992 Summer Olympics.
