= Choe Chol-su =

North Korean boxer (born 1969)

Personal information
- Born: December 1, 1969 (age 56) Kaesong, North Korea

Sport

Korean name
- Hangul: 최철수
- Hanja: 崔鐵洙
- RR: Choe Cheolsu
- MR: Ch'oe Ch'ŏlsu
Medal record
Men's boxing
Representing North Korea
Olympic Games
Gold medal – first place	1992 Barcelona	Flyweight
World Amateur Championships
Silver medal – second place	1991 Sydney	Flyweight
Asian Championships
Bronze medal – third place	1992 Bangkok	Flyweight

Choe Chol-su (Korean: 최철수; born December 1, 1969) is a North Korean boxer who won the gold medal in the men's Flyweight (51 kg) category at the 1992 Summer Olympics in Barcelona.

== Olympic results ==
- Defeated Moustafa Esmail (Egypt) 7–4
- Defeated Paul Ingle (Great Britain) 13–12
- Defeated Robbie Peden (Australia) 25–11
- Defeated István Kovács (Hungary) 10–5
- Defeated Raúl González (Cuba) 12–2

Ingle, Peden and Kovács all went on to become professional boxing world champions.

== See also ==
- Ku Yong-jo
