= Nick Odore =

Kenyan boxer (born 1965)

Personal information
- Full name: Nicodemus Odore
- Born: 24 February 1965 (age 61) Nairobi, Kenya
- Height: 5’11

Sport
- Sport: Boxing

Nick Odore (born 24 February 1965) is a Kenyan boxer. He competed in the men's welterweight event at the 1992 Summer Olympics.
