= Roel Velasco =

Filipino boxer (born 1972)

Medal record

Men's Boxing

Representing Philippines

Olympic Games
Bronze medal – third place	1992 Barcelona	Light Flyweight

World Amateur Championships
Silver medal – second place	1997 Budapest	Light Flyweight

Asian Amateur Boxing Championships
Gold medal – first place	1992 Bangkok	Light Flyweight

Goodwill Games
Bronze medal – third place	1998 New York	Light Flyweight

Muhamad Ali Invitational Boxing Championships
Gold medal – first place	1997 Kentucky	Light Flyweight

Roel Velasco (born June 26, 1972, in Bago, Negros Occidental) is a retired boxer from the Philippines. He competed in the light flyweight (– 48 kg) division during the late 1980s, early 1990s.

He represented his native country of the Philippines at the 1992 Summer Olympics in Barcelona, Spain, where he won the bronze medal. In the semi-finals he was stopped by Cuba's eventual winner Rogelio Marcelo. He is the elder brother of Mansueto Velasco, who won the silver medal at the 1996 Summer Olympics in the same weight division. Roel won the silver medal at the 1997 World Amateur Boxing Championships.

Roel Velasco is the only Filipino to win a medal in the Goodwill Games by snatching the bronze in the light-flyweight division in boxing in the 1998 New York edition. 1997 was a banner year for Velasco as he added the gold medals in the 1st Muhamad Ali Invitational Boxing Championships in Kentucky, the Italian Boxing Championships and the Roberto Balado Cup in Cuba to his World Championship hardware.

Velasco is currently serving with the Philippine Navy with the rank of Petty Officer First Class (P01) while doing double duty as a coach with the Philippine Boxing Team.

As a trainer, he is known for his way of selecting his pupils. As he welcomes anyone who wants to learn from him. He is also known to have an interest in training inexperienced or slow learners stating that:

"Kahit na anong hina ng isang boxer basta masipag sa training, siya ay gagaling na pwede pang higitan ang isang boxer na may talento." ("Even if a boxer is slow learner, he/she can grow into a strong fighter as long as he/she is dedicated to his/her training and can even surpass the strength of a talented boxer.")

== Retirement ==
Velasco retired from boxing around 2001 and is currently a boxing trainer who works with young boxers.

== Olympic results ==
- Defeated James Wanene (Kenya) 16–1
- Defeated Rajendra Prasad (India) 15–6
- Defeated Rowan Williams (Great Britain) 7–6
- Lost to Rogelio Marcelo (Cuba) RSC 1 (1:36)
