= David Serradas =

Venezuelan boxer (born 1969)

Personal information
- Full name: David Wladimir Serradas Suárez
- Born: 17 May 1969 (age 57) Valencia, Carabobo, Venezuela
- Height: 175 cm (5 ft 9 in)
- Weight: 51 kg (112 lb)
Medal record
Men's boxing
Representing Venezuela
Pan American Games
Silver medal – second place	1991 Havana	Flyweight
Central American and Caribbean Games
Gold medal – first place	1990 Mexico City	Flyweight

David Wladimir Serradas Suárez (born 17 May 1969) is a former Venezuelan boxer, competing in the flyweight division.

Serradas competed for his native country at the 1992 Summer Olympics in Barcelona, Spain, where he was defeated in the quarterfinals of the Men's Flyweight (– 51 kg) by Cuba's eventual silver medalist Raúl González. A year earlier he captured the silver medal in the same division at the 1991 Pan American Games.
