= Rajendra Prasad (boxer) =

Indian boxer (born 1968)

- Born: 17 January 1968 (age 57); Bhilai, Chhattisgarh, India
- Citizenship: Indian
- Occupation: Boxer Light flyweight

Rajendra Prasad
Medal record

Men's Boxing

Representing India

South Asian Games
Silver medal – second place	1991 Colombo	light flyweight

Asian Championships
Bronze medal – third place	1992 Bangkok	light Flyweight

Copa Pedro Sotta Alva Cup
Silver medal – second place	1992 Cuba	light Flyweight

Rajendra Prasad (born 17 January 1968 in Bhilai, Chhattisgarh, India) is a retired boxer from India. He competed in the Light flyweight (48 kg) division during the late 1980s and early 1990s, and he was ranked as high as 7th. In 1992, the Indian government gave him the Arjuna Award for his achievements in international boxing.

Prasad represented India at the 1992 Summer Olympics in Barcelona, Spain, where he defeated Andrzej Rzany of Poland 12-6 in first round. In the second round, he lost to bronze medalist Roel Velasco of the Philippines. He also participated at the 1993 World Amateur Boxing Championship. He is currently President of the Chhattisgarh Pradesh Amateur Boxing Federation and Joint Secretary of the Chhattisgarh Olympics Association. He is married to Malini Prasad, and they have two sons, Rahul Prasad and Rohit Prasad.

== Awards and recognition ==
- In 1992, Rajendra received the Arjuna Award, which is presented every year by the Government of India to recognize outstanding achievements in national sports in India.
- Ranked 7th in International Boxing Association(AIBA) in 1992.
- Ranked 5th at Men's 1993 World Amateur Boxing Championships were held in Tampere, Finland

== Olympic results ==
- Defeated Andrzej Rzany (Poland) 12-6
- lost to Roel Velasco (Philippines) 6-15
