= Paul Buttimer =

Irish boxer

Personal information
- Nationality: Irish
- Born: 2 July 1966 (age 58)

Sport
- Sport: Boxing

Paul Buttimer (born 2 July 1966) is an Irish boxer. He competed in the men's flyweight event at the 1992 Summer Olympics.
