= Emerito Concepcion =

Filipino sports shooter (born 1962)

Emerito Concepción
Personal information
- Nationality: Filipino
- Born: 4 July 1962 (age 62)
- Height: 171 cm (5 ft 7 in)
- Weight: 52 kg (115 lb)

Sport
- Sport: Sports shooting

Emerito Concepción (born 4 July 1962) is a Filipino sports shooter. He competed in the men's 10 metre air rifle event at the 1992 Summer Olympics.
