= Pavelló Club Joventut Badalona =

Indoor arena located in Badalona, Catalonia, Spain

Coordinates: 41°26′40″N 2°14′13″E

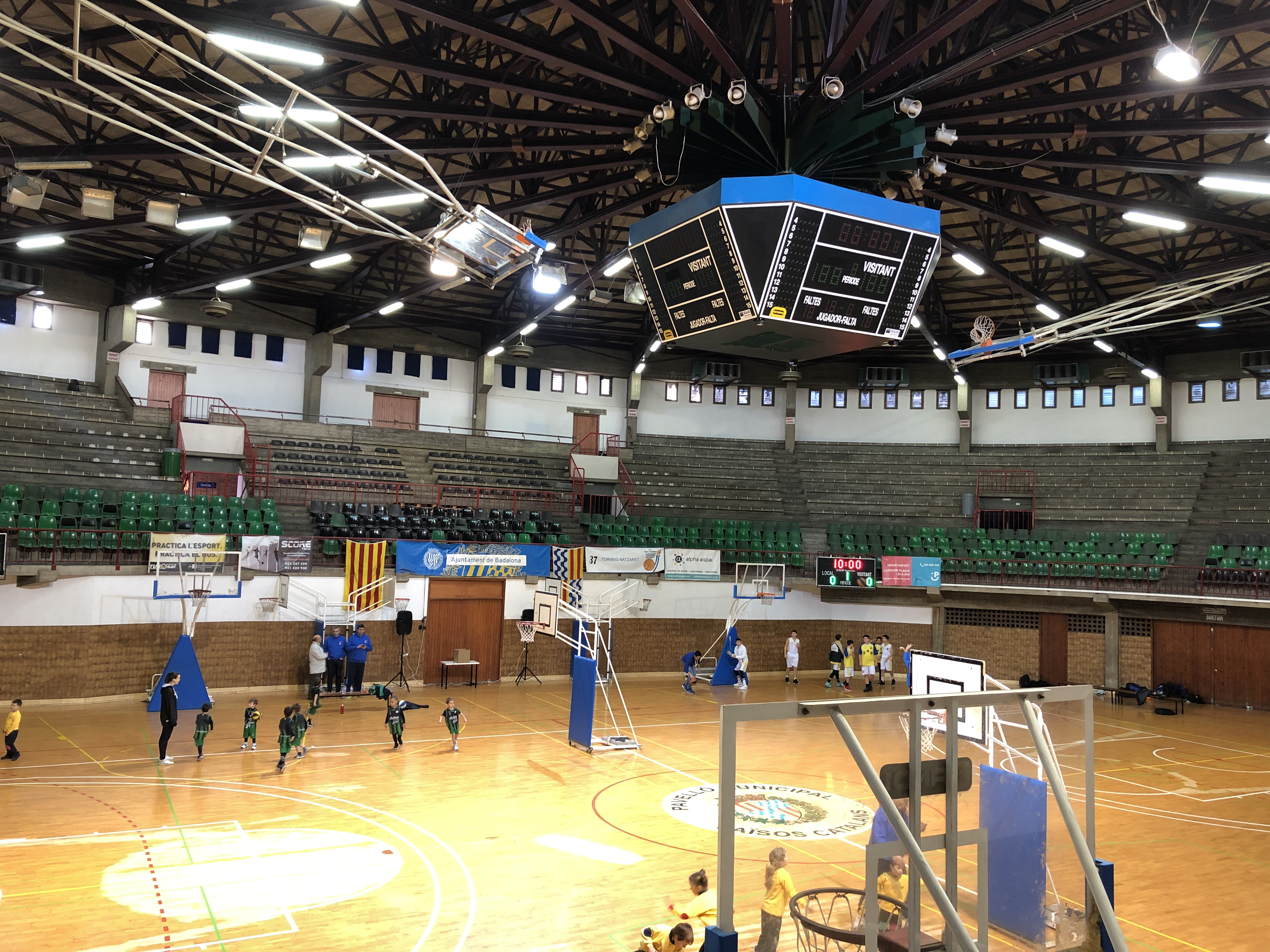
Pavelló Club Joventut Badalona Arena

Pavelló Club Joventut Badalona (also known as Pavelló dels Països Catalans) is an indoor arena located in Badalona, Catalonia, Spain. Built in 1972, it hosted the boxing events for the 1992 Summer Olympics. The arena has a capacity of 3,300 people.
