= Sören Antman =

Swedish boxer (born 1967)

Personal information
- Nationality: Swedish
- Born: 28 January 1967 (age 58); Gävle, Sweden

Sport
- Sport: Boxing

Sören Antman (born 28 January 1967) is a Swedish boxer. He competed at the 1988 Summer Olympics and the 1992 Summer Olympics.
