= Anicet Rasoanaivo =

Malagasy boxer (born 1969)

Personal information
- Full name: Anicet Rasoanaivo
- Nationality: Madagascar
- Born: December 27, 1969 (age 56)
- Height: 1.60 m (5 ft 3 in)
- Weight: 48 kg (106 lb)

Sport
- Sport: Boxing
- Weight class: Light Flyweight
Medal record
All-Africa Games
Silver medal – second place	1991 Cairo	Light Flyweight
Bronze medal – third place	1995 Harare	Light Flyweight
African Amateur Championships
Gold medal – first place	2001 Port Louis	Light Flyweight
Gold medal – first place	2003 Yaoundé	Light Flyweight

Anicet Rasoanaivo (born 1969-12-27) is a retired male boxer from Madagascar, who twice competed for his African country at the Summer Olympics: 1992 and 1996. He is best known for twice winning a gold medal in the men's light flyweight division at the African Amateur Championships: 2001 and 2003.
