= Boxing at the 1992 Summer Olympics =

Boxing at the Games of the XXV Olympiad
- Venue: Pavelló Club Joventut Badalona
- Dates: 26 July-9 August 1992
- Competitors: 336 from 78 nations

Boxing at the 1992 Summer Olympics took place in the old Pavelló Club Joventut Badalona in Barcelona. The boxing schedule began on 26 July and ended on 9 August. Twelve boxing events (all men's individual) were contested, with the participation of 336 athletes from 78 countries.

== Medal table ==
* Host nation (Spain)

Rank	Nation	Gold	Silver	Bronze	Total
1	Cuba	7	2	0	9
2	Germany	2	1	1	4
3	United States	1	1	1	3
4	Ireland	1	1	0	2
5	North Korea	1	0	1	2
6	Nigeria	0	2	0	2
7	Bulgaria	0	1	1	2
7	Canada	0	1	1	2
7	Netherlands	0	1	1	2
7	Unified Team	0	1	1	2
11	Spain*	0	1	0	1
12	Hungary	0	0	3	3
13	South Korea	0	0	2	2
14	Algeria	0	0	1	1
14	Denmark	0	0	1	1
14	Finland	0	0	1	1
14	Great Britain	0	0	1	1
14	Mongolia	0	0	1	1
14	Morocco	0	0	1	1
14	New Zealand	0	0	1	1
14	Philippines	0	0	1	1
14	Poland	0	0	1	1
14	Puerto Rico	0	0	1	1
14	Romania	0	0	1	1
14	Thailand	0	0	1	1
Totals (25 entries)		12	12	24	48

== Medalists ==
Games	Gold	Silver	Bronze
Light flyweight	Rogelio Marcelo; Cuba	Daniel Petrov; Bulgaria	Jan Quast; Germany
Light flyweight	Rogelio Marcelo; Cuba	Daniel Petrov; Bulgaria	Roel Velasco; Philippines
Flyweight	Choi Chol-su; North Korea	Raúl González; Cuba	Tim Austin; United States
Flyweight	Choi Chol-su; North Korea	Raúl González; Cuba	István Kovács; Hungary
Bantamweight	Joel Casamayor; Cuba	Wayne McCullough; Ireland	Mohammed Achik; Morocco
Bantamweight	Joel Casamayor; Cuba	Wayne McCullough; Ireland	Ri Gwang-sik; North Korea
Featherweight	Andreas Tews; Germany	Faustino Reyes; Spain	Ramaz Paliani; Unified Team (Russia)
Featherweight	Andreas Tews; Germany	Faustino Reyes; Spain	Hocine Soltani; Algeria
Lightweight	Oscar De La Hoya; United States	Marco Rudolph; Germany	Namjilyn Bayarsaikhan; Mongolia
Lightweight	Oscar De La Hoya; United States	Marco Rudolph; Germany	Hong Sung-sik; South Korea
Light welterweight	Héctor Vinent; Cuba	Mark Leduc; Canada	Leonard Doroftei; Romania
Light welterweight	Héctor Vinent; Cuba	Mark Leduc; Canada	Jyri Kjäll; Finland
Welterweight	Michael Carruth; Ireland	Juan Hernández Sierra; Cuba	Aníbal Acevedo; Puerto Rico
Welterweight	Michael Carruth; Ireland	Juan Hernández Sierra; Cuba	Arkhom Chenglai; Thailand
Light middleweight	Juan Carlos Lemus; Cuba	Orhan Delibaş; Netherlands	György Mizsei; Hungary
Light middleweight	Juan Carlos Lemus; Cuba	Orhan Delibaş; Netherlands	Robin Reid; Great Britain
Middleweight	Ariel Hernández; Cuba	Chris Byrd; United States	Chris Johnson; Canada
Middleweight	Ariel Hernández; Cuba	Chris Byrd; United States	Lee Seung-bae; South Korea
Light heavyweight	Torsten May; Germany	Rostyslav Zaulychnyi; Unified Team (Ukraine)	Wojciech Bartnik; Poland
Light heavyweight	Torsten May; Germany	Rostyslav Zaulychnyi; Unified Team (Ukraine)	Zoltán Béres; Hungary
Heavyweight	Félix Savón; Cuba	David Izonritei; Nigeria	David Tua; New Zealand
Heavyweight	Félix Savón; Cuba	David Izonritei; Nigeria	Arnold Vanderlyde; Netherlands
Super heavyweight	Roberto Balado; Cuba	Richard Igbineghu; Nigeria	Svilen Rusinov; Bulgaria
Super heavyweight	Roberto Balado; Cuba	Richard Igbineghu; Nigeria	Brian Nielsen; Denmark

== Participating nations ==
- American Samoa (2)
- Algeria (8)
- Angola (1)
- Argentina (3)
- Australia (6)
- Barbados (2)
- Belgium (1)
- Botswana (1)
- Brazil (4)
- Bulgaria (7)
- Canada (10)
- Chile (1)
- China (4)
- Colombia (3)
- Croatia (1)
- Cuba (12)
- Czechoslovakia (4)
- Denmark (4)
- Dominican Republic (6)
- Egypt (3)
- Finland (1)
- France (5)
- Gabon (1)
- Germany (12)
- Ghana (4)
- Great Britain (10)
- Greece (1)
- Guatemala (2)
- Guyana (2)
- Hungary (8)
- India (5)
- Indonesia (2)
- Iran (5)
- Iraq (2)
- Ireland (6)
- Italy (5)
- Jamaica (2)
- Japan (4)
- Kenya (5)
- Laos (1)
- Latvia (1)
- Lithuania (4)
- Madagascar (2)
- Mexico (4)
- Mongolia (6)
- Morocco (7)
- Namibia (1)
- Netherlands (5)
- New Zealand (3)
- Nicaragua (2)
- Nigeria (9)
- North Korea (6)
- Norway (1)
- Pakistan (4)
- Papua New Guinea (5)
- Philippines (6)
- Poland (8)
- Puerto Rico (8)
- Romania (5)
- Seychelles (2)
- South Africa (2)
- South Korea (11)
- Spain (7)
- Swaziland (1)
- Sweden (3)
- Tanzania (5)
- Thailand (6)
- Tunisia (3)
- Turkey (1)
- Uganda (3)
- Unified Team (12)
- United States (12)
- Uruguay (2)
- Venezuela (3)
- Virgin Islands (2)
- Western Samoa (3)
- Zaire (1)
- Zambia (4)
