= Boxing at the 1992 Summer Olympics – Bantamweight =

Boxing at the Olympics

Bantamweight boxing at the Games of the XXV Olympiad
- Venue: Pavelló Club Joventut Badalona
- Dates: 28 July – 8 August 1992
- Competitors: 31 from 31 nations

Medalists
1st place, gold medalist(s)		Joel Casamayor	Cuba
2nd place, silver medalist(s)		Wayne McCullough	Ireland
3rd place, bronze medalist(s)		Mohammed Achik	Morocco
3rd place, bronze medalist(s)		Ri Gwang-sik	North Korea

The men's bantamweight event was part of the boxing programme at the 1992 Summer Olympics. The weight class allowed boxers of up to 54 kilograms to compete. The competition was held from 28 July to 8 August 1992. 31 boxers from 31 nations competed.

== Medalists ==
Gold	Joel Casamayor; Cuba
Silver	Wayne McCullough; Ireland
Bronze	Mohammed Achik; Morocco
Bronze	Ri Gwang-sik; North Korea

== Results ==
The following boxers took part in the event:

Rank	Name	Country
1	Joel Casamayor	Cuba
2	Wayne McCullough	Ireland
3T	Mohammed Achik	Morocco
3T	Ri Gwang-sik	North Korea
5T	Mohammed Sabo	Nigeria
5T	Serafim Todorov	Bulgaria
5T	Roberto Jalnaiz	Philippines
5T	Remigio Molina	Argentina
9T	Ahmed Aboud	Iraq
9T	Chatree Suwanyod	Thailand
9T	Joseph Chongo	Zambia
9T	Sergio Reyes Jr.	United States
9T	Kalai Riadh	Tunisia
9T	Philippe Wartelle	France
9T	Javier Calderón	Mexico
9T	Slimane Zengli	Algeria
17T	Fred Muteweta	Uganda
17T	Vladislav Antonov	Unified Team
17T	Robert Ciba	Poland
17T	John Sem	Papua New Guinea
17T	Magno Ruiz	Guatemala
17T	László Bognár	Hungary
17T	Harold Ramírez	Puerto Rico
17T	Miguel Dias	Netherlands
17T	Devarajan Venkatesan	India
17T	Agustin Castillo	Dominican Republic
17T	Jesús Pérez	Colombia
17T	Benjamin Ngaruiya	Kenya
17T	Óscar Vega	Spain
17T	Dieter Berg	Germany
17T	Zhang Guangping	China

=== First round ===
- Ahmed Aboud (IRQ) – BYE
- Wayne McCullough (IRL) def. Fred Mutuweta (UGA), 28:7
- Chatree Suwanyod (THA) def. Vladislav Antonov (EUN), 6:4
- Mohammed Sabo (NGR) def. Robert Ciba (POL), RSC-3 (02:27)
- Serafim Todorov (BUL) def. John Sem (PNG), 11:0
- Joseph Chongo (ZAM) def. Magno Ruben Ruiz (GUA), 7:3
- Lee Gwang-Sik (PRK) def. László Bognár (HUN), AB-3 (01:00)
- Sergio Reyes Jr. (USA) def. Harold Ramírez (PUR), 10:1
- Riadh Klai (TUN) def. Miguel Dias (NED), 17:1
- Joel Casamayor (CUB) def. Devarajan Venkatesan (IND), 13:7
- Roberto Jalnaiz (PHI) def. Agustín Castillo (DOM), RSCH-1 (02:46)
- Philippe Wartelle (FRA) def. Jesús Pérez (COL), 12:5
- Javier Calderón (MEX) def. Benjamin Ngaruiya (KEN), 16:4
- Remigio Molina (ARG) def. Oscar Vega (ESP), 14:4
- Mohammed Achik (MAR) def. Dieter Berg (GER), 3:0
- Slimane Zengli (ALG) def. Zhang Guangping (CHN), 4:0

=== Second round ===
- Wayne McCullough (IRL) def. Ahmed Aboud (IRQ), 10:2
- Mohammed Sabo (NGR) def. Chatree Suwanyod (THA), 16:7
- Serafim Todorov (BUL) def. Joseph Chongo (ZAM), 18:6
- Lee Gwang-Sik (PRK) def. Sergio Reyes Jr. (USA), 15:8
- Joel Casamayor (CUB) def. Riadh Klai (TUN), 16:11
- Roberto Jalnaiz (PHI) def. Philippe Wartelle (FRA), RSCI-2 (00:32)
- Remigio Molina (ARG) def. Javier Calderón (MEX), 5:4
- Mohammed Achik (MAR) def. Slimane Zengli (ALG), 12:8

=== Quarterfinals ===
- Wayne McCullough (IRL) def. Mohammed Sabo (NGR), 31:13
- Lee Gwang-Sik (PRK) def. Serafim Todorov (BUL), 16:15
- Joel Casamayor (CUB) def. Roberto Jalnaiz (PHI), KO-1 (02:01)
- Mohammed Achik (MAR) def. Remigio Molina (ARG), 15:5

=== Semifinals ===
- Wayne McCullough (IRL) def. Lee Gwang-Sik (PRK), 21:16
- Joel Casamayor (CUB) def. Mohammed Achik (MAR), AB-1 (02:33)

=== Final ===
- Joel Casamayor (CUB) def. Wayne McCullough (IRL), 16:8
