= Algeria at the 1992 Summer Olympics =

- IOC code: ALG
- NOC: Algerian Olympic Committee

in Barcelona
- Competitors: 35 in 7 sports
- Medals Ranked 34th: Gold 1 Silver 0 Bronze 1 Total 2

Summer Olympics appearances (overview)
- 1964; 1968; 1972; 1976; 1980; 1984; 1988; 1992; 1996; 2000; 2004; 2008; 2012; 2016; 2020; 2024; 2028

Other related appearances
- France (1896–1960)

Algeria competed at the 1992 Summer Olympics in Barcelona, Spain. The nation won its first ever gold medal at these Games.

== Medalists ==
Medal	Name	Sport	Event	Date
Gold	Hassiba Boulmerka	Athletics	Women's 1500 metres	8 August
Bronze	Hocine Soltani	Boxing	Featherweight	7 August

== Competitors ==
The following is the list of number of competitors in the Games.

Sport	Men	Women	Total
Athletics	8	1	9
Boxing	8	–	8
Judo	2	1	3
Swimming	1	0	1
Volleyball	10	0	10
Weightlifting	2	–	2
Wrestling	2	–	2
Total	33	2	35

== Results by event ==
=== Athletics ===
==== Men ====
Track and road events

Athletes	Events	Heat Round 1		Semifinal		Final	
Athletes	Events	Time	Rank	Time	Rank	Time	Rank
Réda Abdenouz	800 m	1:46.82	10 Q	1:46.06	6 q	1:48.34	7
Noureddine Morceli	1500 m	3:37.98	14 Q	3:39.22	8 Q	3:41.70	7
Aïssa Bel Aout	5000 m	15:02.76	50	N/A		Did not advance	
Mohamed Salmi	Marathon	N/A				2:26:56	59
Azzedine Brahmi	3000 m steeplechase	8:28.01	8 Q	8:25.85	6 Q	8:20.71	8

Field events

Athlete	Event	Qualification		Final	
Athlete	Event	Result	Rank	Result	Rank
Yacine Mousli	High jump	2.10	=33	did not advance	
Abdelkader Klouchi	Long jump	5.33	46	did not advance	
Lotfi Khaïda	Triple jump	16.31	23	did not advance	

==== Women ====
Track and road events

Athletes	Events	Heat Round 1		Semifinal		Final	
Athletes	Events	Time	Rank	Time	Rank	Time	Rank
Hassiba Boulmerka	1500 m	4:09.91	15 Q	4:03.81	2 Q	3:55.30	Gold medal

=== Boxing ===
Athlete	Event	Round of 32	Round of 16	Quarterfinal	Semifinal	Final
Athlete	Event	Opposition Result	Opposition Result	Opposition Result	Opposition Result	Opposition Result
Mohamed Haioun	Light-Flyweight	Barbu (ROM); L 11-2	Did not advance			
Yacine Sheikh	Flyweight	Filippov (EUN); W 5-3	Peden (AUS); L (KO)	Did not advance		
Slimane Zengli	Bantamweight	Zhang (CHN); W 4-0	Achik (MAR); L 12-8	Did not advance		
Hocine Soltani	Featherweight	Maglioni (ARG); W (RSCH-1)	Gerena (PUR); W 23-0	Damián Sosa (DOM); W 13-4	Tews (GER); L 11-1	Did not advance
Laïd Bouneb	Light-Welterweight	Gollen (IND); W 11-4	Henry (BAR); W 17-3	Leduc (CAN); L 8-1	Did not advance	
Noureddine Meziane	Light-Middleweight	Syed (PAK); W 7-0	Klemetsen (NOR); L 14-3	Did not advance		
Ahmed Dine	Middleweight	Russo (ITA); W 6-4	Joval (NED); W 22-14	Byrd (USA); L 21-2	Did not advance	
Mohamed Ben Guesmia	Light-Heavyweight	Yant (VEN); W 15-11	Bartnik (POL); L 14-3	Did not advance		

=== Judo ===
Men

Athlete	Event	Result
Abdelhakim Harkat	Half-Lightweight	=17
Meziane Dahmani	Lightweight	=9

Women

Athlete	Event	Result
Salima Souakri	Extra-Lightweight	=5

=== Swimming ===
Men

Athletes	Events	Heat		Finals	
Athletes	Events	Time	Rank	Time	Rank
Abderzak Bella	100 m breaststroke	1:07.88	46	Did not advance	
Abderzak Bella	200 m breaststroke	2:26.35	42	Did not advance	

=== Volleyball ===
Men

Team roster:

- Tayeb ElHadi BenKhelfallah
- Krimo Bernaoui
- Ali Dif
- Faycal Gharzouli
- Mourad Malaoui
- Adel Sennoun
- Mourad Sennoun
- Foudil Taalba
- Faycal Tellouche
- Lies Tizi-Oualou

Preliminary round - Pool B

Qualified for the quarterfinals
Eliminated

Rk	Team	Points	Played	Won	Lost	PW	PL	Ratio	SW	SL	Ratio
1	Brazil	10	5	5	0	248	165	1.503	15	2	7.500
2	Cuba	9	5	4	1	231	180	1.283	13	5	2.600
3	(International Olympic Committee) Unified Team	8	5	3	2	229	205	1.117	11	7	1.571
4	Netherlands	7	5	2	3	218	181	1.204	8	9	0.889
5	South Korea	6	5	1	4	142	212	0.670	3	12	0.250
6	Algeria	5	5	0	5	100	225	0.444	0	15	0.000

July 26, 1992; 15:00	Algeria	0–3	(International Olympic Committee) Unified Team
July 26, 1992; 15:00	(8–15, 7–15, 4–15, –––, –––)

July 28, 1992; 10:30	Cuba	3–0	Algeria
July 28, 1992; 10:30	(15–4, 15–3, 15–2, –––, –––)

August 30, 1992; 15:00	Algeria	0–3	South Korea
August 30, 1992; 15:00	(8–15, 11–15, 12–15, –––, –––)

August 1, 1992; 15:00	Netherlands	3–0	Algeria
August 1, 1992; 15:00	(15–2, 15–5, 15–4, –––, –––)

August 3, 1992; 17:30	Algeria	0–3	Brazil
August 3, 1992; 17:30	(8–15, 13–15, 9–15, –––, –––)

=== Weightlifting ===
Athletes	Events	Snatch		Clean & Jerk		Total	Rank
Athletes	Events	Result	Rank	Result	Rank	Total	Rank
Azzedine Basbas	-60 kg	115	=19	150	=11	265	16
Abdelmanaane Yahiaoui	-67.5 kg	140	=4	175	=3	315	4

=== Wrestling ===
Greco-Roman

Athletes	Events	Eliminatory round						Final round	Rank
Athletes	Events	Round 1	Round 2	Round 3	Round 4	Round 5	Round 6	Final round	Rank
Mazouz Ben Djedaa	Lightweight	Chamangoli (IRI); L 6-0	Kim (KOR); L 15-0	Eliminated					
Youssef Bouguerra	Welterweight	Marchl (AUT); L 11-3	Kornbakk (SWE); L 17-1	Eliminated					
