= Boxing at the 1992 Summer Olympics – Light welterweight =

Light welterweight boxing at the Games of the XXV Olympiad
- Venue: Pavelló Club Joventut Badalona
- Dates: 30 July – 9 August 1992
- Competitors: 30 from 30 nations

Medalists
1st place, gold medalist(s)		Héctor Vinent	Cuba
2nd place, silver medalist(s)		Mark Leduc	Canada
3rd place, bronze medalist(s)		Leonard Doroftei	Romania
3rd place, bronze medalist(s)		Jyri Kjäll	Finland

The men's light welterweight event was part of the boxing programme at the 1992 Summer Olympics. The weight class allowed boxers of up to 63.5 kilograms to compete. The competition was held from 30 July to 9 August 1992. 30 boxers from 30 nations competed.

== Medalists ==
Gold	Héctor Vinent; Cuba
Silver	Mark Leduc; Canada
Bronze	Leonard Doroftei; Romania
Bronze	Jyri Kjäll; Finland

== Results ==
The following boxers took part in the event:

Rank	Name	Country
1	Héctor Vinent	Cuba
2	Mark Leduc	Canada
3T	Leonard Doroftei	Romania
3T	Jyri Kjäll	Finland
5T	Peter Richardson	Great Britain
5T	László Szűcs	Hungary
5T	Laïd Bouneb	Algeria
5T	Oleg Nikolayev	Unified Team
9T	Andreas Zülow	Germany
9T	Dillon Carew	Guyana
9T	Michele Piccirillo	Italy
9T	Nyamaagiin Altankhuyag	Mongolia
9T	Christopher Henry	Barbados
9T	Arlo Chavez	Philippines
9T	Hubert Meta	Papua New Guinea
9T	Daniel Fulanse	Zambia
17T	Edwin Cassiani	Colombia
17T	Kim Jae-gyeong	South Korea
17T	Anoushirvan Nourian	Iran
17T	Sergio Rey	Spain
17T	Trevor Shailer	New Zealand
17T	Abdelkader Wahabi	Belgium
17T	Edgar Ruiz	Mexico
17T	Moses James	Nigeria
17T	Khamsavath Vilayphone	Laos
17T	Vernon Forrest	United States
17T	Godfrey Wakaabu	Uganda
17T	Rafael Romero	Dominican Republic
17T	Dong Seidu	Ghana
17T	Sandeep Gollen	India

=== First round ===
- Oleg Nikolaev (EUN) – BYE
- Hubert Tinge Meta (PNG) – BYE
- Héctor Vinent (CUB) def. Edwin Cassiani (COL), 27:4
- Andreas Zülow (GER) def. Kim Jae-Kyung (KOR), 12:0
- Michele Piccirillo (ITA) def. Anoushirvan Nourian (IRN), 23:5
- Jyri Kjäll (FIN) def. Sergio Rey (ESP), RSCH-1
- Lászlo Szücs (HUN) def. Trevor Shailer (NZL), 7:0
- Daniel Fulanse (ZAM) def. Abdelkader Wahabi (BEL), 13:3
- Leonard Doroftei (ROM) def. Edgar Ruiz (MEX), 24:4
- Arlo Chavez (PHI) def. James Mozez (NGR), 12:6
- Nyamaagiin Altankhuyag (MGL) def. Khamsavath Vilayphone (LAO), RSC-2
- Peter Richardson (GBR) def. Vernon Forrest (USA), 14:8
- Mark Leduc (CAN) def. Godfrey Wakaabu (UGA), 9:2
- Dillon Carew (GUY) def. Rafael Romero (DOM), 19:4
- Christopher Henry (BAR) def. Dong Seidu (GHA), DSQ-3
- Laid Bouneb (ALG) def. Saander Kumar Gollen (IND), 11:4

=== Second round ===
- Oleg Nikolaev (EUN) def. Hubert Tinge Meta (PNG), 17:2
- Héctor Vinent (CUB) def. Andreas Zülow (GER), 14:2
- Jyri Kjäll (FIN) def. Michele Piccirillo (ITA), 12:5
- Lászlo Szücs (HUN) def. Daniel Fulanse (ZAM), 15:7
- Leonard Doroftei (ROM) def. Arlo Chavez (PHI), 15:1
- Peter Richardson (GBR) def. Nyamaagiin Altankhuyag (MGL), 21:4
- Mark Leduc (CAN) def. Dillon Carew (GUY), 5:0
- Laid Bouneb (ALG) def. Christopher Henry (BAR), 17:3

=== Quarterfinals ===
- Héctor Vinent (CUB) def. Oleg Nikolaev (EUN), 26:3
- Jyri Kjäll (FIN) def. Lászlo Szücs (HUN), 9:1
- Leonard Doroftei (ROM) def. Peter Richardson (GBR) 20:7
- Mark Leduc (CAN) def. Laid Bouneb (ALG), 8:1

=== Semifinals ===
- Hector Vinent (CUB) def. Jyri Kjäll (FIN), 13:3
- Mark Leduc (CAN) def. Leonard Doroftei (ROM), 13:6

=== Final ===
- Héctor Vinent (CUB) def. Mark Leduc (CAN), 11:1
