= 1992 Summer Olympics Parade of Nations =

During the Parade of Nations portion of the 1992 Summer Olympics opening ceremony, athletes from each country participating in the Olympics paraded in the arena, preceded by their flag. The flag was borne by a sportsperson from that country chosen either by the National Olympic Committee or by the athletes themselves to represent their country.

== Parade order ==
As the nation of the first modern Olympic Games, Greece entered the stadium first; whereas, the host nation Spain marched last. Other countries entered in alphabetical order in the French language, instead of both Catalan and Spanish (despite that these languages had been displayed on the name boards and used to announce the country names), due to the political sensitivity surrounding the use of Catalan. Athletes from Independent Olympic Participants did not attend the parade of nations, but still competed at the Games. The Unified Team, composed of former Soviet states, marched with Olympic flag, then followed by twelve flag bearers carrying their respective nations.

Whilst most countries entered under their short names, a few entered under more formal or alternative names, mostly due to political and naming disputes. The Republic of China (commonly known as Taiwan) entered with the compromised name and flag of "Chinese Taipei" under T so that they did not enter together with the conflicting China, which entered with their official name of the "People's Republic of China" (République populaire de Chine) under C. Similarly, South Korea entered as "Republic of Korea" (République de Corée) under C while North Korea entered as "Democratic People's Republic of Korea" (République populaire démocratique de Corée).

== List ==
The following is a list of each country's announced flag bearer. The list is sorted by the order in which each nation appears in the parade of nations. The names are given in their official designations by the IOC.

Order	Nation	Spanish Name	Catalan Name	French Order	Flag bearer	Sport
1	Greece	Grecia	Grècia	Grèce	Lambros Papakostas	Athletics
2	Afghanistan	Afganistán	Afganistan	Afghanistan		
3	South Africa	Sudáfrica	Sud-àfrica	Afrique du Sud	Jan Tau	Athletics
4	Albania	Albania	Albània	Albanie	Kristo Robo	Shooting
5	Algeria	Argelia	Algèria	Algérie	Mourad Sennoun	Volleyball
6	Germany	Alemania	Alemanya	Allemagne	Manfred Klein	Rowing
7	Andorra	Andorra	Andorra	Andorre	Margarida Moreno	Athletics
8	Angola	Angola	Angola	Angola		
9	Antigua and Barbuda	Antigua y Barbuda	Antiga i Barbuda	Antigua et Barbuda		
10	Netherlands Antilles	Antillas Neerlandesas	Antilles Neerlandeses	Antilles néerlandaises	Michel Daou	Shooting
11	Saudi Arabia	Arabia Saudita	Aràbia Saudita	Arabie saoudite	Medhadi Al-Dosari	Cycling
12	Argentina	Argentina	Argentina	Argentine	Marcelo Garraffo	Field hockey
13	Aruba	Aruba	Aruba	Aruba	Lucien Dirksz	Cycling
14	Australia	Australia	Austràlia	Australie	Jenny Donnet	Diving
15	Austria	Austria	Àustria	Autriche	Elisabeth Theurer	Equestrian
16	Bahamas	Bahamas	Bahames	Bahamas	Troy Kemp	Athletics
17	Bahrain	Bahréin	Bahrain	Bahreïn	Khalid Rabeeah	Chef de mission
18	Bangladesh	Bangladés	Bangladesh	Bangladesh	Mohamed Mukhesur Rahman	Swimming
19	Barbados	Barbados	Barbados	Barbade		
20	Belgium	Bélgica	Bèlgica	Belgique	Frans Peeters	Shooting
21	Belize	Belice	Belize	Belize		
22	Benin	Benín	Benín	Bénin	Sonya Agbéssi	Athletics
23	Bermuda	Bermudas	Bermudes	Bermudes	Brian Wellman	Athletics
24	Bhutan	Bután	Bhutan	Bhoutan	Jubzang Jubzang	Archery
25	Bolivia	Bolivia	Bolívia	Bolivie		
26	Bosnia and Herzegovina	Bosnia y Herzegovina	Bòsnia i Hercegovina	Bosnie-Herzegovine	Zlatan Saračević	Athletics
27	Botswana	Botsuana	Botswana	Botswana		
28	Brazil	Brasil	Brasil	Brésil	Aurélio Miguel	Judo
29	Brunei	Brunéi	Brunei	Brunei		
30	Bulgaria	Bulgaria	Bulgària	Bulgarie	Ivaylo Yordanov	Wrestling
31	Burkina Faso	Burkina Faso	Burkina Faso	Burkina Faso	Franck Zio	Athletics
32	Cayman Islands	Islas Caimán	Illes Caiman	Îles Caïmans	Byron Marsh	Sailing
33	Cameroon	Camerún	Kamerun	Cameroun		
34	Canada	Canadá	Canada	Canada	Mike Smith	Athletics
35	Central African Republic	Central Africa	Àfrica Central	Centrafrique	Mickaël Conjungo	Athletics
36	Chile	Chile	Xile	Chili	Gert Weil	Athletics
37	China	República Popular de China	República Popular de la Xina	République populaire de Chine	Song Ligang	Basketball
38	Cyprus	Chipre	Xipre	Chypre	Marios Hadjiandreou	Athletics
39	Colombia	Colombia	Colòmbia	Colombie	Bernardo Tovar	Shooting
40	Republic of the Congo	República del Congo	República del Congo	République du Congo		
41	Cook Islands	Islas Cook	Illes Cook	Îles Cook	Sam Nunuke Pera	Weightlifting
42	South Korea	Corea	Corea	Corée	Kim Tae-hyun	Weightlifting
43	Costa Rica	Costa Rica	Costa Rica	Costa Rica	Alvaro Guardia	Shooting
44	Ivory Coast	Costa de Marfil	Costa d'Ivori	Côte d'Ivoire		
45	Croatia	Croacia	Croàcia	Croatie	Goran Ivanišević	Tennis
46	Cuba	Cuba	Cuba	Cuba	Héctor Milián	Wrestling
47	Denmark	Dinamarca	Dinamarca	Danemark	Jørgen Bojsen-Møller	Sailing
48	Djibouti	Yibuti	Djibouti	Djibouti	Hussein Ahmed Salah	Athletics
49	Dominican Republic	República Dominicana	República Dominicana	République dominicaine	Altagracia Contreras	Judo
50	Egypt	Republica Arabe de Egipto	República Arabe d'Egipte	République arabe d'Égypte	Mohamed Khorshed	Shooting
51	United Arab Emirates	Unión de Emiratos Arabes	Unió dels Emirats Àrabs	Union des Émirats arabes	Mohamed Salem Al-Tunaiji	Athletics
52	Ecuador	Ecuador	Equador	Équateur	María Cangá	Judo
53	Unified Team (Note: Consisted of twelve former Soviet republics held the flags into representing athletes of those former Republics: Armenia, Azerbaijan, Belarus, Georgia, Kazakhstan, Kyrgyzstan, Moldova, Russia, Tajikistan, Turkmenistan, Ukraine and Uzbekistan.)	Equipo Unificado	Equip Unificat	Équipe unifiée	Alexander Karelin	Wrestling
54	Estonia	Estonia	Estònia	Estonie	Heino Lipp	Athletics (non-competitor)
55	United States	Estados Unidos de América	Estats Units d'Amèrica	États-Unis d'Amérique	Francie Larrieu Smith	Athletics
56	Ethiopia	Etiopía	Etiòpia	Éthiopie	Addis Abebe	Athletics
57	Fiji	Fiyi	Fiji	Fidji	Carl Probert	Swimming
58	Finland	Finlandia	Finlàndia	Finlande	Harri Koskela	Wrestling
59	France	Francia	França	France	Jean-François Lamour	Fencing
60	Gabon	Gabón	Gabon	Gabon		
61	The Gambia	Gambia	Gàmbia	Gambie	Dawda Jallow	Athletics
62	Ghana	Ghana	Ghana	Ghana	John Myles-Mills	Athletics
63	Great Britain	Gran Bretaña	Gran Bretanya	Grande-Bretagne	Steve Redgrave	Rowing
64	Grenada	Granada	Grenada	Grenade	Eugene Licorish	Athletics
65	Guam	Guam	Guam	Guam	Frank Flores	Swimming
66	Guatemala	Guatemala	Guatemala	Guatemala	Julio Sandoval	Shooting
67	Guinea	Guinea	Guinea	Guinée	Soryba Diakité	Athletics
68	Equatorial Guinea	Guinea Ecuatorial	Guinea Equatorial	Guinée équatoriale	Ruth Mangue	Athletics
69	Guyana	Guyana	Guyana	Guyana	Aubrey Richmond	Cycling
70	Haiti	Haití	Haití	Haïti	Hermate Souffrant	Judo
71	Honduras	Honduras	Hondures	Honduras	Ana Joselina Fortin	Swimming
72	Hong Kong	Hong Kong	Hong Kong	Hong Kong		
73	Hungary	Hungría	Hongria	Hongrie	Tibor Komáromi	Wrestling
74	India	India	Índia	Inde	Shiny Abraham-Wilson	Athletics
75	Indonesia	Indonesia	Indonèsia	Indonésie	Christian Hadinata	Badminton
76	Iraq	Irak	Iraq	Irak	Nazar Kadir	Weightlifting
77	Iran	República Islámica de Irán	República Islàmica d'Iran	République islamique d'Iran	Alireza Soleimani	Wrestling
78	Ireland	Irlanda	Irlanda	Irlande	Michelle Smith	Swimming
79	Iceland	Islandia	Islàndia	Islande	Bjarni Friðriksson	Judo
80	Israel	Israel	Israel	Israël	Eldad Amir	Sailing
81	Italy	Italia	Itàlia	Italie	Giuseppe Abbagnale	Rowing
82	Jamaica	Jamaica	Jamaica	Jamaïque	Merlene Ottey	Athletics
83	Japan	Japón	Japó	Japon	Kumi Nakada	Volleyball
84	Jordan	Jordania	Jordània	Jordanie	Fakhredin Fouad	Athletics
85	Kenya	Kenia	Kenya	Kenya	Patrick Sang	Athletics
86	Kuwait	Kuwait	Kuwait	Koweït		
87	Laos	Laos	Laos	Laos	Khamsavath Vilayphone	Boxing
88	Lesotho	Lesoto	Lesotho	Lesotho		
89	Latvia	Letonia	Letònia	Lettonie	Raimonds Bergmanis	Weightlifting
90	Lebanon	Libano	Líban	Liban		
91	Liberia	Liberia	Libèria	Liberia		
92	Libya	Jamahiriya Árabe de Libia	Jamahiriya Àrab de Líbia	Jamahiriya arabe libyenne		
93	Liechtenstein	Liechtenstein	Liechtenstein	Liechtenstein	Manuela Marxer	Athletics
94	Lithuania	Lituania	Lituània	Lituanie	Raimundas Mažuolis	Swimming
95	Luxembourg	Luxemburgo	Luxemburg	Luxembourg	Yves Clausse	Swimming
96	Madagascar	Madagascar	Madagascar	Madagascar	Heritovo Rakotomanga	Boxing
97	Malaysia	Malaisia	Malàisia	Malaisie	Razif Sidek	Badminton
98	Malawi	Malawi	Malawi	Malawi		
99	Maldives	Maldivas	Maldives	Maldives		
100	Mali	Malí	Mali	Mali		
101	Malta	Malta	Malta	Malte	Laurie Pace	Judo
102	Morocco	Marruecos	Marroc	Maroc	Lahcen Samsam Akka	Athletics (non-competitor)
103	Mauritius	Isla Mauricio	Ila Maurici	Île Maurice		
104	Mauritania	Mauritania	Mauritània	Mauritanie		
105	Mexico	México	Mèxic	Mexique	Jesús Mena	Diving
106	Monaco	Monaco	Mònaco	Monaco	Christophe Verdino	Swimming
107	Mongolia	Mongolia	Mongòlia	Mongolie	Badmaanyambuugiin Bat-Erdene	Wrestling
108	Mozambique	Mozambique	Moçambic	Mozambique		
109	Myanmar	Unión de Myanmar	Unió de Myanmar	Union du Myanmar		
110	Namibia	Namibia	Namíbia	Namibie	Frankie Fredericks	Athletics
111	Nepal	Nepal	Nepal	Népal	Hari Rokoya	Athletics
112	Nicaragua	Nicaragua	Nicaragua	Nicaragua	Magdiel Gutiérrez	Wrestling
113	Niger	Níger	Níger	Niger	Abdou Manzo	Athletics
114	Nigeria	Nigeria	Nigèria	Nigeria	Innocent Egbunike	Athletics
115	Norway	Noruega	Noruega	Norvège	Jorunn Horgen	Sailing
116	New Zealand	Nueva Zelanda	Nova Zelanda	Nouvelle-Zélande	Mark Todd	Equestrian
117	Oman	Omán	Oman	Oman		
118	Uganda	Uganda	Uganda	Ouganda	Fred Mutuweta	Boxing
119	Pakistan	Pakistan	Pakistan	Pakistan	Shahbaz Ahmed	Field hockey
120	Panama	Panamá	Panamà	Panama		
121	Papua New Guinea	Papúa Nueva Guinea	Papua Nova Guinea	Papouasie-Nouvelle-Guinée		
122	Paraguay	Paraguay	Paraguai	Paraguay	Ramón Jiménez Gaona	Athletics
123	Netherlands	Países Bajos	Països Baixos	Pays-Bas	Carina Benninga	Field hockey
124	Peru	Peru	Peru	Pérou	Francisco Boza	Shooting
125	Philippines	Filipinas	Filipines	Philippines	Arlo Chavez	Boxing
126	Poland	Polonia	Polònia	Pologne	Waldemar Legień	Judo
127	Puerto Rico	Puerto Rico	Puerto Rico	Porto Rico	Luis Martínez	Judo
128	Portugal	Portugal	Portugal	Portugal	Filipa Cavalleri	Judo
129	Qatar	Catar	Qatar	Qatar		
130	North Korea	República Democrática Popular de Corea	República Democràtica Popular de Corea	République populaire démocratique de Corée	Kim Gil-nam	Boxing
131	Romania	Rumania	Romania	Roumanie	Costel Grasu	Athletics
132	Rwanda	Ruanda	Rwanda	Rwanda	Marcianne Mukamurenzi	Athletics
133	San Marino	San Marino	Sant Marí	Saint-Marin	Sara Casadei	Swimming
134	Saint Vincent and the Grenadines	San Vicente y Granadinas	Sant Vicent i Grenadines	Saint-Vincent-et-les Grenadines	Eversley Linley	Athletics
135	Solomon Islands	Islas Salomón	Illes Salomó	Îles Salomon	Leslie Ata	Weightlifting
136	El Salvador	El Salvador	El Salvador	Salvador	María José Marenco	Swimming
137	American Samoa	Samoa Americanas	Samoa nord-americana	Samoa américaines	Mika Masoe	Boxing
138	Western Samoa	Samoa Occidentales	Samoa Occidentals	Samoa occidentales	Emilio Leti	Boxing
139	Senegal	Senegal	Senegal	Sénégal		
140	Seychelles	Seychelles	Seychelles	Seychelles	Roland Raforme	Boxing
141	Sierra Leone	Sierra Leona	Serra Leone	Sierra Leone	Sanusi Turay	Athletics
142	Singapore	Singapur	Singapur	Singapour	Chng Seng Mok	Shooting
143	Slovenia	Eslovenia	Eslovènia	Slovénie	Rajmond Debevec	Shooting
144	Somalia	Somalia	Somàlia	Somalie		
145	Sudan	Sudan	Sudan	Soudan		
146	Sri Lanka	Sri Lanka	Sri Lanka	Sri Lanka		
147	Sweden	Suecia	Suècia	Suède	Stefan Edberg	Tennis
148	Switzerland	Suiza	Suïssa	Suisse	Daniel Giubellini	Gymnastics
149	Suriname	Surinam	Surinam	Suriname	Tommy Asinga	Athletics
150	Swaziland	Suazilandia	Swazilàndia	Swaziland		
151	Syria	Siria	Síria	Syrie		
152	Chinese Taipei	Chinese Taipei	Chinese Taipei	Chinese Taipei	Wang Kuang-shih	Baseball
153	Tanzania	Tanzania	Tanzània	Tanzanie		
154	Chad	Chad	Txad	Tchad		
155	Czechoslovakia	República Federal Checa y Eslovaca	República Federal de Txecoslovàquia	République fédérale tchèque et slovaque	Jozef Lohyňa	Wrestling
156	Thailand	Tailandia	Tailàndia	Thaïlande		
157	Togo	Togo	Togo	Togo		
158	Tonga	Tonga	Tonga	Tonga		
159	Trinidad and Tobago	Trinidad y Tobago	Trinitat i Tobago	Trinité-et-Tobago	Ian Morris	Athletics
160	Tunisia	Tunisia	Tunísia	Tunisie	Fadhel Khayati	Athletics
161	Turkey	Turquia	Turquia	Turquie	Kerem Ersü	Archery
162	Uruguay	Uruguay	Uruguai	Uruguay	Ricardo Fabini	Sailing
163	Vanuatu	Vanuatu	Vanuatu	Vanuatu	Baptiste Firiam	Athletics
164	Venezuela	Venezuela	Veneçuela	Venezuela	María Elena Giusti	Synchronized swimming
165	Virgin Islands	Islas Virgenes	Illes Verges	Îles Vierges	Neville Hodge	Athletics
166	British Virgin Islands	Islas Virgenes Britanicas	Illes Verges Britàniques	Îles Vierges britanniques	Karl Scatliffe	Athletics
167	Vietnam	Vietnam	Vietnam	Vietnam		
168	Yemen	Yemen	Iemen	Yémen		
169	Zaire	Zaire	Zaire	Zaïre	Muyegbe Mubala	Athletics
170	Zambia	Zambia	Zàmbia	Zambie	Ngozi Mwanamwambwa	Athletics
171	Zimbabwe	Zimbabue	Zimbabwe	Zimbabwe		
172	Spain	España	Espanya	Espagne	Felipe de Borbón	Sailing

== See also ==
- 1988 Summer Olympics national flag bearers
- 1992 Winter Olympics national flag bearers
- 1994 Winter Olympics national flag bearers
- 1996 Summer Olympics national flag bearers
