= Morocco at the 1992 Summer Olympics =

- IOC code: MAR
- NOC: Moroccan Olympic Committee

in Barcelona
- Competitors: 44 in 7 sports
- Medals Ranked 31st: Gold 1 Silver 1 Bronze 1 Total 3

Summer Olympics appearances (overview)
- 1960; 1964; 1968; 1972; 1976; 1980; 1984; 1988; 1992; 1996; 2000; 2004; 2008; 2012; 2016; 2020; 2024

Morocco competed at the 1992 Summer Olympics in Barcelona, Spain.

== Medalists ==
Medal	Name	Sport	Event	Date
Gold	Khalid Skah	Athletics	Men's 10,000 metres	3 August
Silver	Rachid El-Basir	Athletics	Men's 1500 metres	8 August
Bronze	Mohamed Achik	Boxing	Bantamweight	6 August

== Competitors ==
The following is the list of number of competitors in the Games.

Sport	Men	Women	Total
Athletics	12	1	13
Boxing	7	–	7
Football	16	–	16
Table tennis	1	0	1
Tennis	2	0	2
Weightlifting	1	–	1
Wrestling	4	–	4
Total	43	1	44

== Athletics ==
Men
Track and road events

Athlete	Event	Heats		Quarterfinal		Semifinal		Final	
Athlete	Event	Result	Rank	Result	Rank	Result	Rank	Result	Rank
Lahlou Ben Younès	400 metres	45.73	12 Q	45.38	13 Q	45.49	11	Did not advance	
El-Mahjoub Haïda	800 metres	1:48.72	31	—N/a		Did not advance			
Rachid El-Basir	1500 metres	3:38.01	11 Q	—N/a		3:39.26	9 Q	3:40.62	2nd place, silver medalist(s)
Brahim Boutayeb	5000 metres	13:37.27	16 Q	—N/a				13:13.27	4
Mohamed Issangar	5000 metres	13:22.98	3 Q	—N/a				13:28.97	9
Hammou Boutayeb	10,000 metres	28:25.73	15 Q	—N/a				DNF	
Khalid Skah	10,000 metres	28:18.48	6 Q	—N/a				27:46.70	1st place, gold medalist(s)
Salah Qoqaïche	Marathon	—N/a						2:14:25	6
El-Arbi Khattabi	3000 metres steeplechase	8:28.50	11 Q	—N/a		8:27.00	11 q	8:23.82	10
Abdelali Kasbane; Abdel Ghani Guériguer; Bouchaib Belkaid; Lahlou Ben Younès	4 × 400 metres relay	3:02.28	10	—N/a				Did not advance	

Women
Track and road events

Athlete	Event	Heats		Quarterfinal		Semifinal		Final	
Athlete	Event	Result	Rank	Result	Rank	Result	Rank	Result	Rank
Nezha Bidouane	400 metres hurdles	55.95	13 q	—N/a		55.08	11	Did not advance	

== Boxing ==
Athlete	Event	Round of 32	Round of 16	Quarterfinals	Semifinals	Final	
Athlete	Event	Opposition Result	Opposition Result	Opposition Result	Opposition Result	Opposition Result	Rank
Mohamed Zbir	Light flyweight	Quast (GER); L 0–6	Did not advance				
Hamid Berhili	Flyweight	Jensen (DEN); L 4–10	Did not advance				
Mohamed Achik	Bantamweight	Berg (GER); W 3–0	Zengli (ALG); W 12–8	Molina (ARG); W 15–5	Casamayor (CUB); L Retired R1	Did not advance	3rd place, bronze medalist(s)
Kamal Marjouane	Lightweight	Lorcy (FRA); L 7–11	Did not advance				
Abdellah Taouane (Note: also competed at the 1988 Summer Olympics)	Welterweight	Chun (KOR); L 1–5	Did not advance				
Mohamed Mesbahi	Light middleweight	Cadeau (SEY); L 3–5	Did not advance				
Ahmed Sarir	Super heavyweight	Fischer (GER); L RSC R2	Did not advance				

== Football ==
Summary

Key:

- A.E.T – After extra time.
- P – Match decided by penalty-shootout.

Team	Event	Group stage				Quarterfinal	Semi-final	Final / BM	
Team	Event	Opposition Score	Opposition Score	Opposition Score	Rank	Opposition Score	Opposition Score	Opposition Score	Rank
Morocco men's	Men's tournament	South Korea; D 1–1	Sweden; L 0–4	Paraguay; L 1–3	4	Did not advance			

Team roster

Head coach: (Germany) Werner Olk

No.	Pos.	Player	DoB	Age	Caps	Club	Tournament games	Tournament goals	Minutes played	Sub off	Sub on	Cards yellow/red
1	GK	Mustafa Achab	29 September 1969	22	?	(Morocco) Wydad Casablanca
2	DF	Rachid Azzouzi	10 January 1971	21	?	(Germany) MSV Duisburg
3	DF	Abdelkrim El Hadrioui	6 March 1972	20	?	(Morocco) FAR Rabat
4	DF	Mouloud Moudakkar	5 March 1970	22	?	(Morocco) Union Sidi Kacem
5	DF	Mouhcine Bouhlal	22 April 1970	22	?	(Morocco) FAR Rabat
6	DF	Noureddine Naybet	10 February 1970	22	?	(Morocco) Wydad Casablanca
7	MF	Khalid Raghib	22 September 1969	22	?	(Morocco) RS Settat
8	MF	Hicham Dmiai	11 January 1971	21	?	(Morocco) KAC Marrakech
9	FW	Mohamed El Badraoui	27 June 1971	21	?	(Morocco) Raja Beni Mellal
10	MF	Saïd Rokbi	20 October 1969	22	?	(Morocco) RS Settat
11	FW	Mohamed Samadi	21 March 1970	22	?	(Morocco) FAR Rabat
12	MF	Aziz Azim	5 March 1970	22	?	(Morocco) Union Sidi Kacem
13	DF	Rachid Iddaoudi	2 August 1970	21	?	(Morocco) KAC Marrakech
14	DF	Lahcen Abrami	31 December 1969	22	?	(Morocco) Wydad Casablanca
15	MF	Abdelmajid Karaouane	24 January 1970	22	?	(Morocco) FAR Rabat
16	GK	Brahim Bougrine	17 August 1969	22	?	(Morocco) FUS Rabat
17	MF	Youssef Chippo	10 May 1973	19	?	(Morocco) KAC Kenitra
18	MF	Hussein Ammouta	24 October 1969	22	?	(Morocco) FUS Rabat
19	FW	Ahmed Bahja	21 December 1970	22	?	(Morocco) Kawkab Marrakech
20	GK	Mohamed Ibari Mansouri	25 November 1969	22	?	(Morocco) IR Tanger

Group play

Team	Pld	W	D	L	GF	GA	GD	Pts
Sweden	3	1	2	0	5	1	+4	4
Paraguay	3	1	2	0	3	1	+2	4
South Korea	3	0	3	0	2	2	0	3
Morocco	3	0	1	2	2	8	−6	1

Source: FIFA
26 July 1992
21:00

Morocco	1–1	South Korea
Bahja 64'	Report	Jung Jae-kwon 73'

Estadio Luis Casanova, Valencia
Attendance: 2,000
Referee: Arturo Angeles (USA)

28 July 1992
19:00

Sweden	4–0	Morocco
Brolin 14', 69'; Mild 20'; Rödlund 57'	Report

Estadio Nova Creu Alta, Sabadell
Attendance: 5,000
Referee: José Torres Cadena (COL)

30 July 1992
21:00

Paraguay	3–1	Morocco
Arce 43'; Caballero 57'; Gamarra 70'	Report	Naybet 87'

Estadio Luis Casanova, Valencia
Attendance: 2,000
Referee: Markus Merk (GER)

== Table tennis ==
Men

Athlete	Event	Group Stage				Round of 16	Quarterfinal	Semifinal	Final	
Athlete	Event	Opposition Result	Opposition Result	Opposition Result	Rank	Opposition Result	Opposition Result	Opposition Result	Opposition Result	Rank
Abdelhadi Legdali	Singles	Kim (KOR); L 0–2	Mehta (IND); L 1–2	Lü (CHN); L 0–2	4	Did not advance				

== Tennis ==
Men

Athlete	Event	Round of 64	Round of 32	Round of 16	Quarterfinals	Semifinals	Final	
Athlete	Event	Opposition Result	Opposition Result	Opposition Result	Opposition Result	Opposition Result	Opposition Result	Rank
Karim Alami	Singles	Rosset (SUI); L (2–6, 6–4, 1–2 Ret)	Did not advance					
Younes El Aynaoui	Singles	Wilkinson (GBR); W (6–4, 6–1, 7–5)	Becker (GER); L (4–6, 7–5, 4–6, 0–6)	Did not advance				

== Weightlifting ==
Athlete	Event	Snatch		Clean & jerk		Total	Rank
Athlete	Event	Result	Rank	Result	Rank	Total	Rank
Mohamed Meziane	67.5 kg	115.0	16	150.0	15	265.0	15

== Wrestling ==
Greco-Roman

Athlete	Event	Group Stage							Final	
Athlete	Event	Opposition Result	Opposition Result	Opposition Result	Opposition Result	Opposition Result	Opposition Result	Rank	Opposition Result	Rank
Abdel Malek El-Aouad	48 kg	Ohashi (JPN); L 0–15	Dăscălescu (ROU); L Fall	Did not advance				10	Did not advance	
Saïd Tango	52 kg	Sheldon (USA); L 0–7	Meña (PAN); L 2–5	Did not advance				5	Martínez (CUB); L 0–15	10
Abderrahman Naanaa	57 kg	Pehkonen (FIN); L 0–4	Bye	Fernández (MEX); W 4–1	Sandu (ROU); L 0–9	Did not advance		5	Sike (HUN); W w/o	9
Rachid Khdar	62 kg	Bye	Lee (USA); L 0–17	Dietsche (SUI); L Fall	Did not advance			7	Did not advance	

== Sources ==
- Official Olympic Reports
- International Olympic Committee results database
