= 1992 Asian Amateur Boxing Championships =

Boxing competitions

1992 Asian Boxing Championships
- Host city: Bangkok, Thailand
- Dates: 26 February – 4 March 1992
- Main venue: Thammasat University

The 16th edition of the Men's Asian Amateur Boxing Championships was held from February 26 to March 4, 1992 in Bangkok, Thailand.

== Medal summary ==
| Event | Gold | Silver | Bronze |
|---|---|---|---|
| Light flyweight 48 kg | Roel Velasco; Philippines | O Song-chol; North Korea | Cho Dong-bum; South Korea |
| Light flyweight 48 kg | Roel Velasco; Philippines | O Song-chol; North Korea | Rajendra Prasad; India |
| Flyweight; 51 kg | Vichairachanon Khadpo; Thailand | Han Gwang-hyeong; South Korea | Choe Chol-su; North Korea |
| Flyweight; 51 kg | Vichairachanon Khadpo; Thailand | Han Gwang-hyeong; South Korea | Dharmendra Singh Yadav; India |
| Bantamweight; 54 kg | Ri Gwang-sik; North Korea | Chatree Suwanyod; Thailand | Zhang Guangping; China |
| Bantamweight; 54 kg | Ri Gwang-sik; North Korea | Chatree Suwanyod; Thailand | Roberto Jalnaiz; Philippines |
| Featherweight; 57 kg | Park Duk-kyu; South Korea | Ri Chil-gun; North Korea | Somluck Kamsing; Thailand |
| Featherweight; 57 kg | Park Duk-kyu; South Korea | Ri Chil-gun; North Korea | Sandagsürengiin Erdenebat; Mongolia |
| Lightweight; 60 kg | Ronald Chavez; Philippines | Yun Yong-chol; North Korea | Arshad Hussain; Pakistan |
| Lightweight; 60 kg | Ronald Chavez; Philippines | Yun Yong-chol; North Korea | Shigeyuki Dobashi; Japan |
| Light welterweight 63.5 kg | Kim Jae-kyung; South Korea | Nyamaagiin Altankhuyag; Mongolia | Anoushiravan Nourian; Iran |
| Light welterweight 63.5 kg | Kim Jae-kyung; South Korea | Nyamaagiin Altankhuyag; Mongolia | Khamsavath Vilayphone; Laos |
| Welterweight; 67 kg | Chun Jin-chul; South Korea | Khyber Shah; Pakistan | Arkhom Chenglai; Thailand |
| Welterweight; 67 kg | Chun Jin-chul; South Korea | Khyber Shah; Pakistan | Yousef Khateri; Iran |
| Light middleweight 71 kg | Hendrik Simangunsong; Indonesia | Choi Ki-soo; South Korea | Hiroshi Nagashima; Japan |
| Light middleweight 71 kg | Hendrik Simangunsong; Indonesia | Choi Ki-soo; South Korea | Chalit Boonsingkarn; Thailand |
| Middleweight; 75 kg | Lee Seung-bae; South Korea | Bandiin Altangerel; Mongolia | Chao Lu; China |
| Middleweight; 75 kg | Lee Seung-bae; South Korea | Bandiin Altangerel; Mongolia | Park Myong-chol; North Korea |
| Light heavyweight 81 kg | Asghar Ali Changezi; Pakistan | Kim Gil-nam; North Korea | Damdiny Zul; Mongolia |
| Light heavyweight 81 kg | Asghar Ali Changezi; Pakistan | Kim Gil-nam; North Korea | Ko Yo-da; South Korea |
| Heavyweight; 91 kg | Chae Sung-bae; South Korea | Narangsee Promchantuek; Thailand | Jiang Tao; China |
| Heavyweight; 91 kg | Chae Sung-bae; South Korea | Narangsee Promchantuek; Thailand | None awarded |
| Super heavyweight +91 kg | Jeong Seung-won; South Korea | Dildar Ahmed; Pakistan | Kim Myong-nam; North Korea |
| Super heavyweight +91 kg | Jeong Seung-won; South Korea | Dildar Ahmed; Pakistan | Ahmad Abdin; Syria |

== Medal table ==
| Rank | Nation | Gold | Silver | Bronze | Total |
|---|---|---|---|---|---|
| 1 | South Korea | 6 | 2 | 2 | 10 |
| 2 | Philippines | 2 | 0 | 1 | 3 |
| 3 | North Korea | 1 | 4 | 3 | 8 |
| 4 | Thailand | 1 | 2 | 3 | 6 |
| 5 | Pakistan | 1 | 2 | 1 | 4 |
| 6 | Indonesia | 1 | 0 | 0 | 1 |
| 7 | Mongolia | 0 | 2 | 2 | 4 |
| 8 | China | 0 | 0 | 3 | 3 |
| 9 | India | 0 | 0 | 2 | 2 |
| 9 | Iran | 0 | 0 | 2 | 2 |
| 9 | Japan | 0 | 0 | 2 | 2 |
| 12 | Laos | 0 | 0 | 1 | 1 |
| 12 | Syria | 0 | 0 | 1 | 1 |
| Totals (13 entries) | | 12 | 12 | 23 | 47 |
