= Carlos Quintana (boxer) =

Puerto Rican boxer

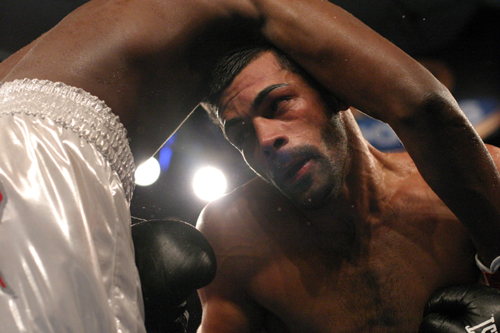

Personal information
- Nickname: El Indio ("The Indian")
- Born: November 6, 1976 (age 49) Moca, Puerto Rico
- Height: 5 ft 9 1/2 in (177 cm)
- Weight: Welterweight; Light middleweight

Boxing career
- Reach: 72 in (183 cm)
- Stance: Southpaw

Boxing record
- Total fights: 33
- Wins: 29
- Win by KO: 23
- Losses: 4

Carlos Quintana (born November 6, 1976) is a retired Puerto Rican professional boxer. As an amateur Quintana represented Puerto Rico. He debuted as a professional in 1997. On February 24, 2006, he participated in his first professional championship fight, defeating Raul Bejerano for the World Boxing Organization's Latino welterweight championship. His first defense took place on June 24, 2006, when he defeated Joel Julio by unanimous decision in a welterweight title eliminator. In this fight he also won the World Boxing Council's Latino welterweight championship. His first world title fight took place on December 2, 2006, when he fought against Miguel Cotto for the World Boxing Association welterweight title. Cotto won the fight by technical knockout. On February 9, 2008, Quintana challenged Paul Williams for the WBO welterweight championship, winning the fight by unanimous decision. He entered the Light Middleweight division to face Deandre Latimore, knocking Latimore out to win the NABO Light Middleweight championship.

== Personal life ==
Quintana was born on November 6, 1976, to Arturo Quintana and Adelina Velázquez. He has 7 siblings, six sisters named Aida, Nydia, Awilda, Magdalena, Omayra and Mabel and one brother named Arturo. Quintana is married to Moraima Quintana and lives with her and the couple's four children, three daughters and a son. He uses his property in Moca as a farm, which he maintains when he is not working. Over the course of his life, Quintana has worked administrating a gasoline station and as the owner of a gymnasium. Quintana's training is managed by José Bonilla, who trained him and was a member of his corner staff during fights.

== Early and amateur career ==
Carlos Quintana was born and raised in Moca, Puerto Rico. He became interested in boxing when he was ten years old and debuted as an amateur five years later. When interviewed Quintana noted that he was winning his fight and enjoy the experience until he received a hit on the troath. After this fight Quintana continued his career, winning multiple national championships in Puerto Rico. In 1996 Quintana was part of the team selected to represent Puerto Rico in the 1996 Summer Olympics. Quintana finished his amateur career with a record of sixty-two wins in seventy fights, with forty-eight of these wins being by knockout.

== Professional career ==
Known as "El Indio", Quintana turned pro in 1997 and won his first 23 professional fights, including 18 by way of KO.

On December 5, 2003, Quintana competed against Candy Robertson in a ten-round fight. Quintana controlled the fight's tempo throughout the contest, which featured several holds. In the seventh round Robertson was docked a point, after losing his mouthpiece on several occasions. The fight ended in the eight round, when Quintana connected several combinations to Robertson's head after trapping him in one of the ring's corners, one of these punches connected on his opponent's face and he collapsed unable to recover before the count of ten. On March 5, 2004, Quintana fought against Edwin Cassiani in the undercard of a fight organized in Pala, California. Quintana scored the fight's first knockdown in the first round, when he connected a combination to his adversary's body. Following this round both fighter traded combinations. In the third round Quintana connected six consecutive punches to Cassiani's face, which made him collapse to the ring's canvas, the referee immediately stopped the fight.

Quintana's next fight was against Kemal Kolonivic in a fight that took place on August 24, 2004. Kolonivic was used as a late replacement and was scheduled to fight in the undercard of a card that included Jose Nieves vs. Alberto Ontiveros. Quintana won the fight by unanimous decision. The judges awarded him scores of 80-72, 80-72 and 79-73.

Quintana's next fight was against Nurhan Suleyman, on February 25, 2005. The card was organized in Miami, Oklahoma, and was scheduled for ten rounds. Early in the first round Quintana connected a solid punch on Suleyman's chin, and subsequently began boxing while his opponent followed him around the ring, he closed the first round connecting two combinations. This pattern continued in the second round when Quintana relied on boxing and connecting jabs, the round closed with both men trading punches. Quintana controlled the fight's tempo in the third and began the fourth round on the offensive scoring solid punches while trading combinations with his adversary, with one minute remaining in the round Quintana scored a knockdown and the fight was stopped seconds after when Suleyman didn't respond to his attack.

On July 12, 2005, Quintana was scheduled to fight against Francisco Campos. Quintana began the fight on the offensive, connecting punches while boxing. In the third round of his punches connected solidly on Campos' chin. In the fourth round Campos tried to fight inside, but was countered by his opponent's strategy. Santos began the fifth round on the offensive, while Quintana used combinations to the body. Quintana began the sixth by connecting a solid punch that made his opponent switch to a defensive stance. This pattern continued until the round ended, the fight was stopped between rounds when Santos informed the referee that he was unable to continue, thus awarding Quintana a technical knockout victory. On February 24, 2006, Quintana had his first professional championship fight, when he fought against Raul Bejerano of Argentina for the vacant World Boxing Organization's Latino welterweight title, in an event that took place in Ponce, Puerto Rico. In the tenth round Quintana scored a knockdown when one of his punches injured Berejano. Once his opponent recovered he continued in the offensive and connected several combinations before the fight was stopped by technical knockout. Prior to this fight Berjerano had never been knocked down in his career.

On June 24, 2006, Quintana fought against Joel Julio of Colombia in a welterweight title eliminator sanctioned by the World Boxing Association. The boxing card was organized at Caesars Palace in Las Vegas. Quitana dominated the fight's tempo throughout the contest relying on his boxing skills while Julio tried to utilize his strength. The judges awarded Quintana a unanimous decision with scores of 118-110, 117-111 and 115-112. In this match Quintana defended the WBO's Latino welterweight title and won the World Boxing Council's Latino welterweight title. This was regarded as one of Quintana's most important fights, prompting future championship opportunities.

On December 2, 2006, Quintana fought fellow undefeated Puerto Rican Cotto, who moved up in weight from Jr. Welterweight. Quintana started the fight boxing and connecting right jabs, the round concluded with both users exchanging combinations. This pattern continued in the second round, with Cotto connecting two solid body punches to Quintana. Quintana began the third round connecting a solid jab to Cotto's face, but the round concluded with Cotto connecting several combinations to the body. In the fifth round Cotto had control of the fight's tempo, and connected several combinations to the body, scoring a knockdown while switching between the orthodox and southpaw stances. Between rounds Quintana indicated that he was unable to continue, the corner wanted to continue but Quintana was unresponsive when the referee asked if he wanted to proceed. The fight was stopped and Cotto was declared the winner, when interviewed Quintana noted that he: "underestimated his velocity. He has very quick hands, you have to give all the respect to Miguel, he's very fast and he hit me pretty good."

=== Winning and defending the welterweight title ===
Williams, the reigning World Boxing Organization welterweight champion, had been scheduled for a unification bout against IBF welterweight champion Kermit Cintron on February 2, 2008. However, Cintron injured his right hand in November 2007, and was forced to pull out of the fight. After Judah reportedly turned down an offer to take Cintron's place, an offer was instead extended to Quintana. The fight took place on February 9, 2008, and Quintana scored an impressive win over Williams, outboxing him in the bout.

On June 7, 2008, Carlos Quintana was defeated by Paul Williams in the first round at 2:15 to lose the welterweight title.

=== Light middleweight division ===
Quintana returned to action on October 25, 2008, this time competing in the light middleweight division. His first fight in this category was against Joshua Onyango, serving as the main event of a card titled "Final Decision" which was held in Arecibo, Puerto Rico. He was able to establish control of the fight's tempo from an early stage, eventually scoring a knockdown in the third. In the fourth round, the referee decided to stop the contest when Onyango was unable to respond to a combination, awarding Quintana a technical knockout victory. Following the outcome of this fight, he announced his decision to move up in weight in a definitive manner.

=== Return to welterweight division ===
Quintana would return to the welterweight division on April 11, 2010, to take on WBC welterweight champion, Andre Berto for the latter's WBC belt. In a rough and rugged slug-fest, Quintana was eventually overwhelmed by the speed and power of the younger Berto and would go on to lose the fight by an 8th-round TKO.

On May 5, 2012, Quintana defeated Deandre Latimore by KO in the 6th round to win the NABO light middleweight title.

In November 2012, Quintana (29–4, 23KOs) finally decided to call it a day. The Puerto Rican boxer announced his retirement after suffering a fourth-round TKO defeat to Keith Thurman (19–0, 18KOs) at the Citizens Business Bank Arena in Ontario, California on the 24th of that month. Throughout his career he won 29 of 33 professional contests, only coming up short against fellow world champion fighters Miguel Cotto, Paul Williams, Andre Berto and Keith Thurman.

== Professional boxing record ==
33 fights	29 wins	4 losses
By knockout	23	4
By decision	6	0

No.	Result	Record	Opponent	Type	Round, time	Date	Location	Notes
33	Loss	29–4	Keith Thurman	TKO	4 (10)	2012-11-24	Citizens Business Bank Arena, Ontario, California, U.S.	Lost NABO light-middleweight title
32	Win	29–3	Deandre Latimore	TKO	6 (10)	2012-05-05	MGM Grand Garden Arena, Paradise, Nevada, U.S.	Won vacant NABO light-middleweight title
31	Win	28–3	Yoryi Estrella	TKO	9 (10)	2011-02-18	Auditorio Juan Pachín Vicéns, Ponce, Puerto Rico	
30	Loss	27–3	Andre Berto	TKO	8 (12)	2010-04-10	BankAtlantic Center, Sunrise, Florida, U.S.	For WBC welterweight title
29	Win	27–2	Jesse Feliciano	TKO	3 (10)	2009-12-05	Boardwalk Hall, Atlantic City, New Jersey, U.S.	
28	Win	26–2	Joshua Onyango	TKO	4 (10)	2008-10-25	Coliseo Manuel Iguina, Arecibo, Puerto Rico	
27	Loss	25–2	Paul Williams	TKO	1 (12)	2008-06-07	Mohegan Sun Arena, Uncasville, Connecticut, U.S.	Lost WBO welterweight title
26	Win	25–1	Paul Williams	UD	12 (12)	2008-02-09	Pechanga Resort & Casino, Temecula, California, U.S.	Won WBO welterweight title
25	Win	24–1	Christopher Henry	TKO	4 (8)	2007-09-29	Boardwalk Hall, Atlantic City, New Jersey, U.S.	
24	Loss	23–1	Miguel Cotto	RTD	5 (12)	2006-12-02	Boardwalk Hall, Atlantic City, New Jersey, U.S.	For vacant WBA welterweight title
23	Win	23–0	Joel Julio	UD	12 (12)	2006-06-24	Caesars Palace, Paradise, Nevada, U.S.	Retained WBO Latino welterweight title; Won vacant WBC Latino welterweight title
22	Win	22–0	Raul Eduardo Bejarano	TKO	10 (12)	2006-02-24	Auditorio Juan Pachín Vicéns, Ponce, Puerto Rico	Won vacant WBO Latino welterweight title
21	Win	21–0	Dillon Carew	KO	1 (10)	2005-08-26	Westchester County Center, White Plains, New York, U.S.	
20	Win	20–0	Francisco Campos	TKO	6 (10)	2005-07-12	Playboy Mansion, Los Angeles, California, U.S.	
19	Win	19–0	Nurhan Süleymanoğlu	TKO	4 (10)	2005-02-25	Buffalo Run Casino, Miami, Oklahoma, U.S.	
18	Win	18–0	Kemal Kolenovic	UD	8 (8)	2004-08-24	Mid-Hudson Civic Center, Poughkeepsie, New York, U.S.	
17	Win	17–0	Oscar Delgado	TKO	1 (10)	2004-05-20	HP Pavilion, San Jose, California, U.S.	
16	Win	16–0	Edwin Cassiani	KO	3 (10)	2004-03-05	Pala Casino Resort and Spa, Pala, California, U.S.	
15	Win	15–0	Quandray Robertson	KO	8 (10)	2003-12-05	Sports and Fitness Center, Charlotte Amalie, U.S. Virgin Islands	
14	Win	14–0	Vinroy Barrett	UD	10 (10)	2003-07-03	Mountaineer Casino, New Cumberland, West Virginia, U.S.	
13	Win	13–0	Vincent Harris	TKO	7 (10)	2002-05-11	Roberto Clemente Coliseum, San Juan, Puerto Rico	
12	Win	12–0	John Scalzi	TKO	1 (10)	2002-02-02	Sovereign Center, Reading, Pennsylvania, U.S.	
11	Win	11–0	Jesus Felipe Valverde	UD	12 (12)	2001-06-16	Cintas Center, Cincinnati, Ohio, U.S.	Won vacant WBA Fedecentro welterweight title
10	Win	10–0	Rosember Palacios	TKO	2 (10)	2000-11-28	The Orleans, Paradise, Nevada, U.S.	
9	Win	9–0	Miguel Avila	TKO	1 (10)	2000-08-12	Paris Las Vegas, Paradise, Nevada, U.S.	
8	Win	8–0	Angel Villegas	TKO	7 (8)	2000-01-05	Ponce, Puerto Rico	
7	Win	7–0	Jesus Arroyo	PTS	6 (6)	1999-04-15	Mayagüez, Puerto Rico	
6	Win	6–0	Angel Villegas	TKO	4 (6)	1998-12-19	Moca, Puerto Rico	
5	Win	5–0	Julio Melendez	TKO	1 (?)	1998-09-19	Moca, Puerto Rico	
4	Win	4–0	Carlos Flores	TKO	1 (4)	1998-04-30	The Chili Pepper, Fort Lauderdale, Florida, U.S.	
3	Win	3–0	Roberto Melendez	TKO	1 (?)	1998-02-06	Mayagüez, Puerto Rico	
2	Win	2–0	Oscar Rivera	TKO	2 (?)	1997-11-06	Dorado, Puerto Rico	
1	Win	1–0	Leoncio Medina	TKO	1 (?)	1997-06-14	Dorado, Puerto Rico	

== See also ==
- List of southpaw stance boxers
- Boxing in Puerto Rico
- List of Puerto Rican boxing world champions
- List of world welterweight boxing champions

Sporting positions
Regional boxing titles
Vacant Title last held by Juan Mosquera	WBA Fedecentro welterweight champion June 16, 2001 – 2001; Vacated	Vacant Title next held by Elio Ortiz
Vacant Title last held by Felix Flores	WBO Latino welterweight champion February 24, 2006 – 2006; Vacated	Vacant Title next held by Joel Julio
Vacant Title last held by Irving Garcia	WBC Latino welterweight champion June 24, 2006 – 2006; Vacated	Vacant Title next held by Anderson Clayton
Vacant Title last held by Jonathan González Ortiz	NABO light-middleweight champion May 5, 2012 – November 24, 2012	Succeeded by Keith Thurman
World boxing titles
Preceded by Paul Williams	WBO welterweight champion February 9, 2008 – June 7, 2008	Succeeded by Paul Williams
