= Bernaoui =

Bernaoui is a surname. Notable people with the surname include:

- Hamid Bernaoui (1937–2020), Algerian footballer
- Krimo Bernaoui (born 1967), Algerian volleyball player
- Nassim Islam Bernaoui (born 1977), Algerian fencer
- Raouf Salim Bernaoui (born 1975), Algerian fencer
