= László Szűcs =

László Szűcs may refer to:

- László Szűcs (boxer) (born 1969), Hungarian boxer
- László Szűcs (footballer) (born 1991), Hungarian footballer
