= Krimo =

Krimo is a given name. Notable people with the name include:

- Krimo Bernaoui (born 1967), Algerian volleyball player
- Krimo Rebih (1932–2012), Algerian footballer
