= Ri Gwang-sik =

North Korean boxer (born 1970)

Personal information
- Born: March 5, 1970 (age 56)

Korean name
- Hangul: 리광식
- RR: Ri Gwangsik
- MR: Ri Kwangsik
Medal record
Men's Boxing
Representing North Korea
Olympic Games
Bronze medal – third place	1992 Barcelona	Bantamweight
World Amateur Championships
Bronze medal – third place	1989 Moscow	Flyweight
Bronze medal – third place	1991 Sydney	Bantwamweight
Asian Amateur Boxing Championships
Gold medal – first place	1992 Bangkok	Bantamweight

Ri Gwang-sik (born March 5, 1970) is a North Korean boxer who won a bronze medal in the men's bantamweight (54 kg) category at the 1992 Summer Olympics in Barcelona. He also captured a bronze medal at the 1991 World Amateur Boxing Championships.

== Olympic results ==
- Defeated Laszlo Bognar (Hungary) TKO 3 (1:00)
- Defeated Sergio Reyes Jr. (United States) 15–8
- Defeated Serafim Todorov (Bulgaria) 16–15
- Lost to Wayne McCullough (Ireland) 16–21
