= Sergio Reyes =

Sergio Reyes may refer to:

- Sergio Reyes Jr., American boxer
- Sergio Reyes (runner), American long-distance runner
