= Mark Leduc =

Canadian boxer

Personal information
- Born: May 4, 1962 Toronto, Canada
- Died: 22 July 2009 (aged 47) Toronto, Canada

Sport
- Sport: Boxing
Medal record
Representing Canada
Olympic Games
Silver medal – second place	1992 Barcelona	Light Welterweight

Mark Leduc (May 4, 1962 – July 22, 2009) was a boxer from Canada, who won a silver medal at the 1992 Barcelona Summer Olympics.

== Amateur career ==
- Amateur Record: 184-26
- Won an Olympic Silver Medal 1992 for Canada.

=== Olympic results ===
- Defeated Godfrey Wakaabu (Uganda) 9-2
- Defeated Dillon Carew (Guyana) 5-0
- Defeated Laid Bouneb (Algeria) 8-1
- Defeated Leonard Dorin (Romania) 13-6
- Lost to Héctor Vinent (Cuba) 1-11

== Professional boxing career ==
Leduc turned pro in 1992 and had limited success. He retired in 1993 with a record of 4-1-0 after losing to Michel Galarneau.

== Retirement and coming out ==
In 1993, Leduc spoke about being a gay athlete in CBC Radio's documentary "The Last Closet", which aired on the weekly sports series The Inside Track; as he was not yet ready to officially come out, the interview was aired anonymously and recorded through a voice filter. Another Canadian athlete who would also subsequently come out as gay, Mark Tewksbury, also granted an anonymous interview to the same program. In 1994, Leduc officially came out as gay in the TV documentary For the Love of the Game, one of the few boxers ever to do so. He also later volunteered as a speaker and mentor for various LGBT youth groups.

He attended Toronto’s Pride Parade in 1999 as grand marshal with Savoy Howe. Leduc worked for and volunteered with the Toronto People with AIDS Foundation, later becoming a set-builder and construction worker in the film industry.

Leduc died on July 22, 2009, in Toronto. He had collapsed in the sauna of St. Mark's Spa and doctors suggested that his death may have resulted from heat stroke. In 2019 playwright Raymond Helkio wrote "LEDUC: A Public Life of Solitude", a play documenting the life and death of Mark Leduc.
