= Joel Julio =

Colombian boxer

Personal information
- Nationality: (Colombia) Colombian
- Born: Joel Jalil Julio Mejia; 18 January 1985 (age 41) Montería, Colombia
- Height: 5 ft 10 in (1.78 m)
- Weight: Light Middleweight

Boxing career
- Stance: Orthodox

Boxing record
- Total fights: 55
- Wins: 39
- Win by KO: 33
- Losses: 24

Joel Jalil Julio Mejia (born 18 January 1985 in Montería, Colombia) is a professional Colombian boxer rated as a junior middleweight. In 2005, he was named ESPN.com's Boxing Prospect of the Year and he has appeared on Ring Magazine's New Faces feature, as well as in ShoBox.

== Professional career ==
Julio's first loss was a 12-round unanimous decision to Puerto Rican boxer Carlos Quintana on 24 June 2006. He has since moved up to Junior Middleweight and bounced back with 5 consecutive wins, a disputed split decision over Cosme Rivera and 3 impressive KO wins over Francisco Campos, Thomas Davis and Mauro Lucero.

On 11 July 2007, Julio faced Cornelius Bundrage of Contender fame. Julio's skill and accuracy became evident early in the fight as he outlanded the slower Bundrage. Julio scored knockdowns in the third and eighth rounds, ultimately winning via eighth-round TKO.

Julio took on another former "Contender" participant Ishe Smith on 30 April 2008 in Vancouver. Smith's defensive style nullified Julio's power but it was not enough to get him the win, with Julio taking a close 10 round unanimous decision.

On 13 August 2008, at the Seminole Hard Rock Hotel and Casino in Hollywood, Florida, Julio defeated Jose Varela by sixth-round technical knockout. Julio knocked down his opponent five times before Varela's corner stopped the fight after the conclusion of round six.

On 1 November 2008, Julio suffered the second loss of his career to southpaw Sergiy Dzindziruk via 12 round unanimous decision.

He was stopped by fellow power-punching prospect James Kirkland in his next bout, 7 March 2009.

He was knocked out by Alfredo Angulo during their bout on 24 April 2010.

== Titles won ==
Julio hasn't held a major title, but captured the following regional titles:

- WBA FEDEBOL Welterweight Title (2003)
- WBC Continental Americas Light Welterweight Title (2003)
- WBA Fedecentro Welterweight Title (2006)
- WBO Latino Welterweight Title (2006)

== Professional boxing record ==
63 fights	39 wins	24 losses
By knockout	33	10
By decision	6	14

No.	Result	Record	Opponent	Type	Round, time	Date	Location	Notes
63	Loss	39–24	(England) Chris Mulunda	UD	4	2026-07-11	Europa Point Sports Complex, Gibraltar	
62	Loss	39–23	(Poland) Hubert Kwapisz	KO	2 (8) 0:44	2025-06-20	Hotel Terminal, Wrocław, Poland	
61	Loss	39–22	(Netherlands) Ronald Weikamp	UD	6	2025-03-29	Sporthal de Willisstee, Wilnis, Netherlands	
60	Loss	39–21	(Ukraine) Yuriy Zakharieiev	UD	4	2024-12-14	Stereo Plaza, Kyiv, Ukraine	
59	Loss	39–20	(England) Derrick Osaze	TKO	3 (8) 2:02	2024-03-30	Arena Sofia, Sofia, Bulgaria	
58	Loss	39–19	(Albania) Alban Beqiri	UD	6	2023-11-28	Tirana Olympic Park, Tirana, Albania	
57	Loss	39–18	(Moldova) Vasile Cebotari	TKO	6 (8) 1:15	2023-08-26	Wrocław Stadium, Wrocław, Poland	
56	Loss	39–17	(Kazakhstan) Tursynbay Kulakhmet	KO	2 (8) 2:58	2023-07-22	Dubai Studio City, Dubai, United Arab Emirates	
55	Loss	39–16	(England) Lewis Crocker	KO	2 (6) 1:59	2023-04-14	Glasgow Boxing Academy, Glasgow, Scotland	
54	Loss	39–15	(Poland) Rafał Wołczecki	KO	1 (8) 2:05	2023-01-28	Hala Sportowa, Nowy Sącz, Poland	
53	Loss	39–14	(England) Lee Cutler	PTS	6	2022-12-17	Bournemouth International Centre, Bournemouth, England	
52	Loss	39–13	(England) Aaron Sutton	PTS	8	2022-11-12	The Galleries, Bristol, England	
51	Loss	39–12	(Poland) Łukasz Maciec	UD	8	2022-05-20	Hala Zespołu Szkół, Środa Wielkopolska, Poland	
50	Loss	39–11	(France) Milan Prat	KO	1 (8) 3:00	2022-03-24	Hotel Intercontinental, Paris, France	
49	Loss	39–10	(Russia) Vadim Tukov	UD	8	2022-02-19	RCC Boxing Academy, Yekaterinburg, Russia	
48	Loss	39–9	(Germany) Björn Schicke	TKO	2 (8) 2:28	2021-11-26	AGON Sportpark, Charlottenburg, Germany	
47	Loss	39–8	(Poland) Tomasz Nowicki	UD	8	2021-09-24	Hala Sportowa, ul.Obrzycka 88, Oborniki, Poland	
46	Loss	39–7	(Poland) Kamil Gardzielik	UD	8	2021-07-09	Hala Widowiskowo-Sportowa, Turek, Poland	
45	Loss	39–6	(Ukraine) Eduard Skavynskyi	UD	10	2021-05-07	KRK Uralets, Yekaterinburg, Russia	
44	Loss	39–5	(Germany) Haro Matevosyan	UD	10	2020-08-28	Havelstudios Charlottenburg, Germany	For vacant BDB International super welterweight title
43	Win	39–4	(Colombia) Segundo Herrera	KO	3 (8), 2:44	2018-11-30	Hotel El Prado, Barranquilla, Colombia	
42	Win	38–4	(Colombia) Victor Coronado	TKO	6 (8)	2014-11-14	Centro Recreativo Tacasuam, Monteria, Colombia	
41	Win	37–4	(Benin) Anges Adjaho	UD	10	2012-05-20	(United States) Prudential Center, Newark, New Jersey, USA	
40	Win	36–4	(United States) Jamaal Davis	UD	10	2010-08-21	(United States) Prudential Center, Newark, New Jersey, USA	
39	Loss	35–4	(Mexico) Alfredo Angulo	KO	11 (12), 1:39	2010-04-24	(United States) Citizens Business Bank Arena, Ontario, California, USA	For interim WBO Super welterweight title.
38	Win	35–3	(United States) Clarence Taylor	UD	6	2009-10-16	(United States) Miccosukee Indian Gaming Resort, Miami, Florida, USA	
37	Loss	34–3	(United States) James Kirkland	TKO	6 (10), 3:00	2009-03-07	(United States) HP Pavilion, San Jose, California, USA	
36	Loss	34–2	(Ukraine) Serhiy Dzinziruk	UD	12	2008-11-01	König Pilsener Arena, Oberhausen, Germany	For WBO Super welterweight title.
35	Win	34–1	(Nicaragua) Jose Varela	TKO	6 (10), 2:59	2008-08-13	(United States) Seminole Hard Rock Hotel & Casino Hollywood, Hollywood, Florida, USA	Won vacant WBO Latino Super welterweight title.
34	Win	33–1	(United States) Ishe Smith	UD	10	2008-04-30	River Rock Casino Resort, Richmond, British Columbia, Canada	
33	Win	32–1	(United States) Cornelius Bundrage	TKO	8 (10), 1:08	2007-07-11	(United States) Kodak Theatre, Hollywood, California, USA	
32	Win	31–1	(Mexico) Mauro Lucero	KO	1 (8), 3:00	2007-05-16	(United States) Seminole Hard Rock Hotel & Casino Hollywood, Hollywood, Florida, USA	
31	Win	30–1	(United States) Thomas Davis	KO	7 (10), 2:47	2007-03-30	(United States) Cobo Hall, Detroit, Michigan, USA	
30	Win	29–1	(Costa Rica) Francisco Campos	KO	3 (10), 2:33	2006-12-16	(United States) Miccosukee Indian Gaming Resort, Miami, Florida, USA	
29	Win	28–1	(Mexico) Cosme Rivera	SD	12	2006-10-27	(United States) Miccosukee Indian Gaming Resort, Miami, Florida, USA	Won WBA Fedecentro Welterweight title. Won WBO Latino Welterweight title.
28	Loss	27–1	(Puerto Rico) Carlos Quintana	UD	12	2006-06-24	(United States) Caesars Palace, Las Vegas, Nevada, USA	For WBC Latino Welterweight title. For WBO Latino Welterweight title. WBA Welterweight title eliminator.
27	Win	27–0	(Dominican Republic) Wilmer Mejia	RTD	2 (6), 3:00	2006-02-25	(United States) Mandalay Bay Resort & Casino, Las Vegas, Nevada, USA	
26	Win	26–0	(Uganda) Robert Kamya	KO	3 (10), 1:32	2006-01-06	(United States) Cicero Stadium, Cicero, Illinois, USA	
25	Win	25–0	(Cuba) Hicklet Lau	TKO	4 (8), 2:11	2005-11-30	(United States) Schuetzen Park, North Bergen, New Jersey, USA	
24	Win	24–0	(Barbados) Christopher Henry	TKO	4 (8), 2:49	2005-08-20	(United States) Allstate Arena, Rosemont, Illinois, USA	
23	Win	23–0	(United States) Arthur Medina	TKO	1 (10), 2:56	2005-06-24	(United States) Boardwalk Hall, Atlantic City, New Jersey, USA	
22	Win	22–0	(Argentina) Carlos Wilfredo Vilches	TKO	3 (10), 3:00	2005-04-08	(United States) Miccosukee Indian Gaming Resort, Miami, Florida, USA	
21	Win	21–0	(Colombia) Aurelio Julio	TKO	1 (8)	2005-02-11	Gimnasio Chico de Hierro, Cartagena, Colombia	
20	Win	20–0	(Algeria) Maamar Hadidi	TKO	3 (8)	2004-12-03	Alfafar, Spain	
19	Win	19–0	(Mexico) Antonio Soriano	KO	3 (6), 1:11	2004-11-05	(United States) Plaza Hotel & Casino, Las Vegas, Nevada, USA	
18	Win	18–0	(Colombia) Elias Ruiz	KO	2 (6)	2004-09-18	Cartagena, Colombia	
17	Win	17–0	(Colombia) Eliseo Ferias	KO	2 (?)	2004-08-21	Colombia	
16	Win	16–0	(Colombia) Saul Torres	TKO	6 (8)	2004-03-06	Centro de Convenciones, Cartagena, Colombia	
15	Win	15–0	(Venezuela) Lino Perez Jr.	PTS	10	2003-10-08	Colombia	
14	Win	14–0	(Dominican Republic) Carlos Robles	TKO	1 (?)	2003-07-26	Bogotá, Colombia	
13	Win	13–0	(Panama) Pedro Lopez	TKO	2 (12)	2003-07-04	Coliseo "Happy" Lora, Monteria, Colombia	Won vacant WBC Continental Americas Super lightweight title.
12	Win	12–0	(Venezuela) Angel Granados	KO	4 (10)	2003-03-29	Hotel Tequendama Internacional, Bogotá, Colombia	Won WBA FEDEBOL Welterweight title.
11	Win	11–0	(Colombia) Cesar Piedrahita	KO	2 (4)	2003-03-01	Colombia	
10	Win	10–0	(Panama) Eduardo De la Cruz	TKO	9 (12)	2002-09-13	Bogotá, Colombia	
9	Win	9–0	(Colombia) Jose Guaranda	KO	3 (?)	2002-05-31	Colombia	
8	Win	8–0	(Colombia) Julio Colorado	KO	4 (6)	2002-04-30	Monteria, Colombia	
7	Win	7–0	(Colombia) Hernan Gutierrez	TKO	2 (6)	2002-03-15	Bogotá, Colombia	
6	Win	6–0	(Colombia) Manuel Sarmiento	KO	2 (?)	2002-02-22	Colombia	
5	Win	5–0	(Colombia) Placido Coneo	KO	2 (?)	2001-12-22	Canalete, Colombia	
4	Win	4–0	(Colombia) Leonardo Angulo	KO	1 (?)	2001-09-23	Colombia	
3	Win	3–0	(Colombia) Jose Durante	KO	1 (?)	2001-08-31	Monteria, Colombia	
2	Win	2–0	(Colombia) Luis Ramirez	KO	1 (4)	2001-08-07	Colombia	
1	Win	1–0	(Colombia) Jorge Perez	KO	4 (4)	2001-05-18	Monitos, Colombia	Professional debut
