= Joel Casamayor =

Cuban boxer (born 1971)

Personal information
- Nickname: El Cepillo ("The Brush")
- Nationality: Cuban; American
- Born: Joel Casamayor Johnson; July 12, 1971 (age 55) Guantánamo, Cuba
- Height: 5 ft 7 in (170 cm)
- Weight: Super featherweight; Lightweight; Light welterweight

Boxing career
- Reach: 69 in (175 cm)
- Stance: Southpaw

Boxing record
- Total fights: 45
- Wins: 38
- Win by KO: 22
- Losses: 6
- Draws: 1
Medal record
Representing Cuba
Men's amateur boxing
Olympic Games
Gold medal – first place	1992 Barcelona	Bantamweight
World Championships
Silver medal – second place	1993 Tampere	Bantamweight
Central American and Caribbean Games
Bronze medal – third place	1990 Mexico City	Bantamweight
Goodwill Games
Silver medal – second place	1994 Saint Petersburg	Featherweight

Joel Casamayor Johnson (born July 12, 1971) is a Cuban American former professional boxer who competed from 1996 to 2011. He held world championships in two weight classes, including the WBA super featherweight title from 2000 to 2002; and the WBC, Ring magazine and lineal lightweight titles between 2006 and 2008. As an amateur, Casamayor won a gold medal in the bantamweight division at the 1992 Olympics, after which he defected to the United States on the eve of the 1996 Olympics.

== Amateur career ==
Casamayor's amateur record stands at 363 wins and 30 losses.

- 1989 – Gold medal (Bantamweight) at the Junior World Championships
- 1992 – Gold medal (Bantamweight) at the 1992 Summer Olympics in Barcelona, Spain
  - Defeated Venkatesan Devarajan (India) points
  - Defeated Riadh Klaai (Tunisia) points
  - Defeated Roberto Jalnaiz (Philippines) KO 1
  - Defeated Mohammed Achik (Morocco) TKO 1
  - Defeated Wayne McCullough (Ireland) points
- 1993 – Silver medal (Bantamweight) at the 1993 World Amateur Boxing Championships in Tampere, Finland
  - Defeated Agathangelos Tsiripidis (Greece) TKO 3
  - Defeated Dirk Krueger (Germany) points
  - Defeated Arthur Mikaelian (Armenia) points
  - Defeated Vladislav Antonov (Russia) points
  - Lost to Alexander Hristov (Bulgaria) points
- 1994 – Bronze medal (Featherweight) at the World Cup in Bangkok, Thailand
  - Defeated Brian Carr (Scotland) points
  - Defeated Nourredine Medjihoud (Algeria) points
  - Defeated Cristian Rodriguez (Argentina) points
  - Lost to Falk Huste (Germany) points
- 1994 – Silver Medal (Featherweight) at the Goodwill Games in St. Petersburg, Russia
  - Defeated Kai Kandelin (Finland) TKO 1
  - Defeated Claude Chinon (France) points
  - Lost to Ramaz Paliani (Russia) points
- 1995 – Competed (Featherweight) at the 1995 World Amateur Boxing Championships in Berlin, Germany
  - Lost to Raimkul Malachbekov (Russia) points

== Professional career ==
He won the NABF Super Featherweight title in 1999 by beating Jose Luis Noyola. Later that year, he won the WBA Super Featherweight title by stopping Jong-Kwon Baek in 5 rounds. In 2002, he lost that title in a controversial unification bout with WBO champion Acelino Freitas. At one point in the fight, Casamayor slipped and the referee ruled it a knockdown. Casamayor also had a point deducted for a late hit. Many believe Casamayor should have won the fight. In 2004, Diego Corrales, whom Casamayor stopped in 2003 for the Vacant IBA super featherweight title, defeated him for the vacant WBO Super Featherweight title via a very close and controversial decision. Casamayor failed to take the WBC Lightweight title from José Luis Castillo later that year because the judges scored what seemed to be a clear win for Casamayor over Castillo. After the disputed loss to Castillo, Casamayor's career appeared to be in a downward spiral and he was set up with undefeated rising prospect Almazbek Raiymkulov in June 2005. In a close, spirited battle the bout ended in a draw, with many believing that Casamayor's best days were behind him.

After two victories against little known opposition, in October 2006, Casamayor yet again took on the popular Diego Corrales, and defeated him by split decision, winning the WBC Lightweight title and recognition as the world lightweight champion by Ring Magazine. He was stripped of the WBC title for signing to fight then WBO lightweight champion Freitas rather than defend against his mandatory challenger, WBC interim champion David Díaz. Although the fight with Freitas never took place, David Díaz was still named WBC champion and Freitas went on to fight WBA champion Juan Díaz, losing via a 9th-round TKO.

After Casamayor threatened the WBC with legal action, he was named as their interim champ. He defended the interim championship as well as The Ring's title against Jose Armando Santa Cruz on November 11, 2007, and won a controversial split decision.

The WBC removed Casamayor's interim title when, instead of fighting a rematch with Santa Cruz, he signed to fight undefeated Michael Katsidis, the WBO interim lightweight titlist. On March 22, 2008, in a great battle, Casamayor became the first man to defeat the Australian Katsidis when he won the fight with a TKO in the 10th round. With the win, Casamayor retained his Ring Magazine world title and added the WBO interim championship to his collection.

=== Casamayor vs. Marquez ===
Casamayor was defeated by Juan Manuel Márquez on September 13, 2008. Marquez (49–4–1, 36 KOs) by Knockout in the 11th round at the MGM Grand Garden Arena, Paradise. In the first four rounds of the bout, Marquez continually walked into counter lefts from Casamayor. It took Marquez until the fifth round to be able to find the range with his right hand. By the fifth round, a cut over Casamayor's right eye was opened from a clash of heads. Rounds five, six, seven and eight were rounds where Marquez landed straight punches from the outside, but he was also nailed by Casamayor whenever he lunged forward. Two minutes into the eleventh round, Casamayor was knocked down by a right hand as he pulled away from an intense exchange. Casamayor got up and immediately tried to smother Marquez, but Marquez let his hands go in furious combination. Casamayor swung back, but he went down again with about 7 seconds left in the round. Referee Tony Weeks stepped in and stopped the fight before Casamayor had a chance to stand up again. This caused some anger from fans, however, Casamayor was gracious in defeat and said, "Marquez was the best this night." The official judges had the fight scored 95-95, 95-95, and 97-93 for Marquez.

Casamayor is a unionized boxer, a member of the Joint Association of Boxers.

=== Comeback ===
On November 6, 2009, Casamayor beat Jason Davis by unanimous decision.

Casamayor fought Mexican American Robert Guerrero at the Mandalay Bay in Las Vegas, on July 31, 2010. The 10 round bout was an undercard of the Juan Manuel Márquez vs. Juan Díaz II event. The 39-year-old pugilist lost the match by unanimous decision: 98–89, 98–89, 97–90. Guerrero rocked Casamayor throughout the fight, sending him down in the second round. The Cuban got up and looked exhausted after two rounds. He recovered in the next rounds but Guerrero continued to put pressure, landing several combinations and outboxing him. In the last minute of the final round, the Cuban engaged on the offensive, with Guerrero being knocked down for the first time in his professional career.

== Professional boxing record ==
45 fights	38 wins	6 losses
By knockout	22	2
By decision	16	4
Draws	1	

No.	Result	Record	Opponent	Type	Round, time	Date	Location	Notes
45	Loss	38–6–1	Timothy Bradley	TKO	8 (12), 2:59	Nov 12, 2011	MGM Grand Garden Arena, Paradise, Nevada, U.S.	For WBO junior welterweight title
44	Win	38–5–1	Manuel Leyva	SD	10	Mar 11, 2011	Planet Hollywood Resort & Casino, Paradise, Nevada, U.S.	
43	Loss	37–5–1	Robert Guerrero	UD	10	Jul 31, 2010	Mandalay Bay Events Center, Paradise, Nevada, U.S.	
42	Win	37–4–1	Jason Davis	UD	8	Nov 6, 2009	Pearl Concert Theater, Paradise, Nevada, U.S.	
41	Loss	36–4–1	Juan Manuel Márquez	TKO	11 (12), 2:55	Sep 13, 2008	MGM Grand Garden Arena, Paradise, Nevada, U.S.	Lost The Ring lightweight title
40	Win	36–3–1	Michael Katsidis	TKO	10 (12), 0:30	Mar 22, 2008	Morongo Casino Resort & Spa, Cabazon, California, U.S.	Retained The Ring lightweight title; Won WBO interim lightweight title
39	Win	35–3–1	José Santa Cruz	SD	12	Nov 10, 2007	Madison Square Garden, New York City, New York, U.S.	Retained WBC interim and The Ring lightweight titles
38	Win	34–3–1	Diego Corrales	SD	12	Oct 7, 2006	Mandalay Bay Events Center, Paradise, Nevada, U.S.	Won The Ring and vacant WBC lightweight titles
37	Win	33–3–1	Lamont Pearson	TKO	9 (10), 0:44	Jul 7, 2006	Celebrity Theatre, Phoenix, Arizona, U.S.	
36	Win	32–3–1	Antonio Ramirez	KO	5 (10), 0:26	Feb 24, 2006	Hard Rock Live, Hollywood, Florida, U.S.	
35	Draw	31–3–1	Almazbek Raiymkulov	SD	12	Jun 11, 2005	Madison Square Garden, New York City, New York, U.S.	
34	Loss	31–3	José Luis Castillo	SD	12	Dec 4, 2004	Mandalay Bay Events Center, Paradise, Nevada, U.S.	For WBC and The Ring lightweight titles
33	Win	31–2	Daniel Seda	UD	10	Jul 3, 2004	American Airlines Arena, Miami, Florida, U.S.	
32	Loss	30–2	Diego Corrales	SD	12	Mar 6, 2004	Foxwoods Resort Casino, Ledyard, Connecticut, U.S.	Lost IBA super featherweight title; For vacant WBO super featherweight title
31	Win	30–1	Diego Corrales	TKO	6 (12), 3:00	Oct 4, 2003	Mandalay Bay Events Center, Paradise, Nevada, U.S.	Won vacant IBA super featherweight title
30	Win	29–1	Nate Campbell	UD	10	Jan 25, 2003	Pechanga Resort & Casino, Temecula, California, U.S.	
29	Win	28–1	Yoni Vargas	TKO	5 (10), 2:28	Dec 20, 2002	American Airlines Arena, Miami, Florida, U.S.	
28	Win	27–1	Juan Jose Arias	TKO	8 (10), 1:44	Jun 8, 2002	The Pyramid, Memphis, Tennessee, U.S.	
27	Loss	26–1	Acelino Freitas	UD	12	Jan 12, 2002	Cox Pavilion, Paradise, Nevada, U.S.	Lost WBA super featherweight title; For WBO super featherweight title
26	Win	26–0	Joe Morales	TKO	8 (12), 2:04	Sep 29, 2001	Miccosukee Resort & Gaming, Miami, Florida, U.S.	Retained WBA super featherweight title
25	Win	25–0	Edwin Santana	UD	12	May 5, 2001	Silver Star Hotel and Casino, Philadelphia, Mississippi, U.S.	Retained WBA super featherweight title
24	Win	24–0	Robert Garcia	TKO	9 (12), 1:14	Jan 6, 2001	Texas Station, North Las Vegas, Nevada, U.S.	Retained WBA super featherweight title
23	Win	23–0	Radford Beasley	TKO	5 (12), 0:52	Sep 16, 2000	MGM Grand Garden Arena, Paradise, Nevada, U.S.	Retained WBA super featherweight title
22	Win	22–0	Bernard Harris	UD	10	Jul 22, 2000	American Airlines Arena, Miami, Florida, U.S.	
21	Win	21–0	Baek Jong-kwon	TKO	5 (12), 2:18	May 21, 2000	Harrah's, North Kansas City, Missouri, U.S.	Won WBA super featherweight title
20	Win	20–0	David Santos	UD	12	Nov 20, 1999	Miccosukee Resort & Gaming, Miami, Florida, U.S.	Retained WBA interim super featherweight title
19	Win	19–0	Luis Enrique Valenzuela	TKO	2 (10), 2:26	Aug 21, 1999	Miccosukee Resort & Gaming, Miami, Florida, U.S.	
18	Win	18–0	Antonio Hernández	UD	12	Jun 19, 1999	Miccosukee Resort & Gaming, Miami, Florida, U.S.	Won WBA interim super featherweight title
17	Win	17–0	Jay Cantù	KO	6 (10), 1:02	Apr 18, 1999	Miccosukee Resort & Gaming, Miami, Florida, U.S.	
16	Win	16–0	Russell Stoner Jones	UD	10	Mar 14, 1999	Pueblo, Colorado, U.S.	
15	Win	15–0	Jose Luis Noyola	UD	12	Jan 30, 1999	Miccosukee Resort & Gaming, Miami, Florida, U.S.	Won vacant NABF super featherweight title
14	Win	14–0	Raymond Flores	TKO	2 (6), 2:59	Nov 13, 1998	Miccosukee Resort & Gaming, Miami, Florida, U.S.	
13	Win	13–0	Eugene Johnson	UD	6	Sep 26, 1998	Mohegan Sun Arena, Montville, Connecticut, U.S.	
12	Win	12–0	Miguel Figueroa	TKO	2 (6)	Aug 22, 1998	Boardwalk Hall, Atlantic City, New Jersey, U.S.	
11	Win	11–0	Gary Triano	TKO	4 (6), 0:59	Jul 21, 1998	Etess Arena, Atlantic City, New Jersey, U.S.	
10	Win	10–0	Javier Diaz	UD	8	Jan 23, 1998	Order Sons of Italy, Lake Worth, Florida, U.S.	
9	Win	9–0	Julio Gervacio	TKO	2 (10), 1:27	Oct 4, 1997	Boardwalk Hall, Atlantic City, New Jersey, U.S.	
8	Win	8–0	Pat Chavez	UD	6	Aug 19, 1997	Convention Center, Austin, Texas, U.S.	
7	Win	7–0	Salvador Montes	TKO	2 (4), 2:15	Jul 12, 1997	Caesars Tahoe, Stateline, Nevada, U.S.	
6	Win	6–0	Raul Munoz	TKO	1 (6), 1:49	May 4, 1997	Circus Maximus Showroom, Atlantic City, New Jersey, U.S.	
5	Win	5–0	Francisco Valdez	TKO	3 (6), 1:49	Apr 18, 1997	Las Vegas Hilton, Winchester, Nevada, U.S.	
4	Win	4–0	Vidal Padilla	TKO	1 (4)	Jan 18, 1997	San Juan, Puerto Rico	
3	Win	3–0	Roberto Sierra	KO	1 (4), 1:48	Dec 14, 1996	Convention Hall, Atlantic City, New Jersey, U.S.	
2	Win	2–0	Oscar Junior Gonzalez	UD	4	Nov 1, 1996	Miami, Florida, U.S.	
1	Win	1–0	David Chamendis	KO	1 (4), 1:34	Sep 20, 1996	James L. Knight Convention Center, Miami, Florida, U.S.	

== Titles in boxing ==
=== Major world titles ===
- WBA super featherweight champion (130 lbs)
- WBC lightweight champion (135 lbs)

=== The Ring magazine titles ===
- The Ring lightweight champion (135 lbs)

=== Interim world titles ===
- WBA interim super featherweight champion (130 lbs)
- WBC interim lightweight champion (135 lbs)
- WBO interim lightweight champion (135 lbs)

=== Minor world titles ===
- IBA super featherweight champion (130 lbs)

=== Regional/International titles ===
- NABF super featherweight champion (130 lbs)

Sporting positions
Regional boxing titles
Vacant Title last held by Jesús Chávez	NABF super featherweight champion January 30, 1999 – May 1999; Vacated	Vacant Title next held by Jesús Chávez
Interim world boxing titles
Preceded by Antonio Hernández	WBA super featherweight champion Interim title June 19, 1999 – May 21, 2000; Won world title	Vacant Title next held by Jorge Solís
Vacant Title last held by David Díaz	WBC lightweight champion Interim title February 20, 2007 – 2008; Stripped	Vacant Title next held by Antonio DeMarco
Preceded by Michael Katsidis	WBO lightweight champion Interim title March 22, 2008 – September 2008; Vacated	Vacant Title next held by Michael Katsidis
Minor world boxing titles
Vacant Title last held by Diego Corrales	IBA super featherweight champion October 4, 2003 – March 6, 2004	Succeeded by Diego Corrales
Major world boxing titles
Preceded by Baek Jong-kwon	WBA super featherweight champion May 21, 2000 – January 12, 2002; Lost bid for Super title	Succeeded by Acelino Freitas as Super champion
Vacant Title last held by Diego Corrales	WBC lightweight champion October 7, 2006 – February 20, 2007; Status changed	Succeeded by David Díaz promoted from interim status
Vacant Title last held by Diego Corrales	The Ring lightweight champion October 7, 2006 – September 13, 2008	Succeeded by Juan Manuel Márquez
Vacant Title last held by Diego Corrales	Lineal lightweight champion October 7, 2006 – September 13, 2008	Succeeded by Juan Manuel Márquez
