= Bruno Wartelle =

French boxer

Personal information
- Nationality: France
- Born: 26 August 1971 (age 54) Algiers
- Weight: Lightweight
- Relative: Philippe Wartelle (brother)

Boxing career
Medal record
Men's amateur boxing
Representing France
Mediterranean Games
Silver medal – second place	1991 Athens	Lightweight
Bronze medal – third place	1993 Languedoc-Roussillon	Lightweight
World Championships
Silver medal – second place	1995 Berlin	Lightweight
Goodwill Games
Bronze medal – third place	1994 Saint Petersburg	Lightweight

Bruno Wartelle (born 26 August 1971) is a French boxer.

== Life and career ==
Wartelle was born in Algiers. He is the brother of Philippe Wartelle, an Olympic boxer.

Wartelle competed at the 1991 and 1993 Mediterranean Games, winning the silver and bronze medal in the lightweight event. He also competed at the 1995 World Amateur Boxing Championships, winning the silver medal in the lightweight (-60 kilograms) event.
