= Abdelkader Wahabi =

Belgian boxer (born 1964)

Personal information
- Nationality: Belgian
- Born: 20 March 1964 (age 61); Berkane, Morocco

Sport
- Sport: Boxing

Abdelkader Wahabi (born 20 March 1964) is a Belgian boxer. He competed in the men's light welterweight event at the 1992 Summer Olympics.
