= Sergio Rey =

Spanish boxer (born 1969)

Sergio Rey Revilla (born November 4, 1969, in San Sebastián) is a former boxer from Spain, who represented his native country at the 1992 Summer Olympics in Barcelona. There he was eliminated in the first round of the light welterweight division (– 63.5 kg) by Finland's eventual bronze medalist Jyri Kjäll.
