= Mohammed Achik =

Moroccan boxer

Personal information
- Born: February 1, 1965 (age 61)
Medal record
Men's Boxing
Representing Morocco
Olympic Games
| Bronze medal – third place | 1992 Barcelona | Bantamweight |
Mediterranean Games
| Bronze medal – third place | 1991 Athens | Bantamweight |

Mohamed Abdelhak Achik (born February 1, 1965) is a former Moroccan amateur boxer who won a bronze medal in the men's bantamweight (54 kg) category at the 1992 Summer Olympics in Barcelona.

== 1992 Olympic results ==
Below are the results of Mohammed Achik, a Moroccan bantamweight boxer who competed at the 1992 Barcelona Olympics:

- Round of 32: Defeated Dieter Berg (Germany) on points, 3-0
- Round of 16: Defeated Slimane Zengli (Algeria) on points, 12-8
- Quarterfinal: Defeated Remigio Molina (Argentina) on points, 15-5
- Semifinal: Lost to Joel Casamayor (Cuba) by a TKO at 2:33 of the first round (was awarded bronze medal)
