= Roberto Jalnaiz =

Filipino boxer

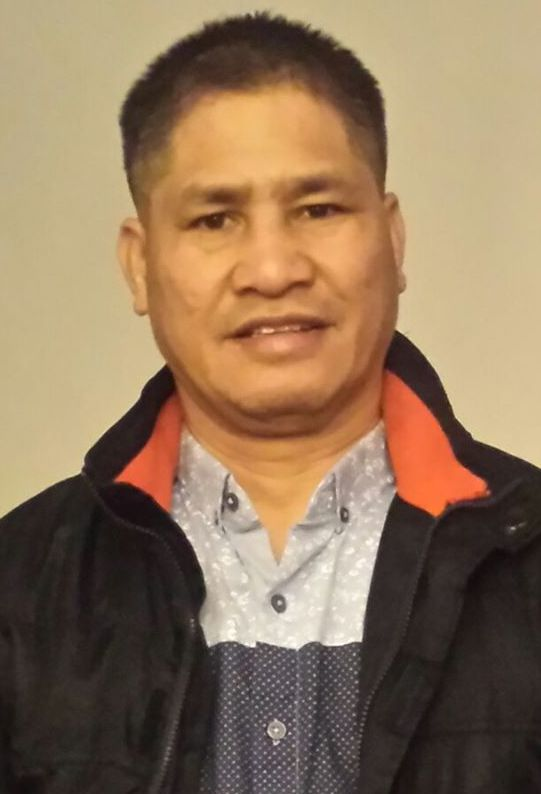

Personal information
- Nickname: Bobby
- Born: November 15, 1966 (age 59) Jagna, Bohol
- Height: 5 ft 6 in (167 cm)
- Weight: 112 lb (51 kg)

Boxing career
- Weight class: Flyweight, Bantamweight
Medal record
Men's Boxing
Representing the Philippines
Asian Games
Gold medal – first place	1990 Beijing	Bantamweight
Asian Amateur Boxing Championships
Gold medal – first place	1991 Bangkok	Bantamweight
Bronze medal – third place	1992 Bangkok	Bantamweight
Southeast Asian Games
Gold medal – first place	1991 Manila	Bantamweight
Bronze medal – third place	1987 Jakarta	Flyweight

Roberto Alas Jalnaiz (born November 10, 1966) is a retired amateur boxer from the Philippines who is best known for winning his country's only gold medal at the 1990 Asian Games. Competing in the bantamweight (– 54 kg) division, he also represented his native country at the 1988 Summer Olympics and 1992 Summer Olympics.

== Career ==
Jalnaiz first campaigned in the flyweight division where he won a bronze medal at the 1987 Southeast Asian Games in Jakarta. The following year, he took part in the 1988 Summer Olympics and lost to Hungary's Janos Varadi in his opening bout.

He eventually moved up to bantamweight and stayed in that division for the rest of his career.

At the 1990 Asian Games in Beijing, Jalnaiz made history by becoming the lone Filipino athlete to win a gold medal in the quadrennial multi-sport spectacle. He defeated Thailand's Chatree Suwanyod, Nepal's Suresh Malla Thakuri, Indonesian Franky Mamuaya and South Korean Hwang Kyung-sup en route to winning a gold medal in the bantamweight class.

Jalnaiz followed up his Beijing triumph by winning another gold medal, this time at the 1991 Asian Amateur Boxing Championships in Bangkok. He also topped his division at the 1991 Southeast Asian Games in Manila.

Jalnaiz qualified for the 1992 Summer Olympics by reaching the semifinal of the 1992 Asian Amateur Boxing Championships in Bangkok.

He stopped Agustin Castillo of the Dominican Republic in his opening bout in Barcelona before posting another abbreviated victory over Frenchman Philippe Wartelle to reach the quarterfinals of the bantamweight division.

Jalnaiz was leading Joel Casamayor halfway through the first round of their quarterfinal bout when the fancied Cuban landed a solid left that knocked him out and abruptly put an end to their duel. Casamayor went on to win the gold medal.

Jalnaiz retired after the Barcelona Games and became a boxing trainer and talent scout. He later became boxing project director of Cagayan de Oro, a position he held until 2012 when he and his family migrated to the United States.

Jalnaiz remained involved in boxing after settling in California and was often included in Manny Pacquiao’s large entourage whenever the Filipino ring icon has a fight in the United States.

He also joined the camp of Jerwin Ancajas in 2018 but left a year later.

== Personal life ==
Roberto Jalnaiz is the son of Arquipo Jalnaiz and Apolinaria Alas. Jalnaiz and his wife Mary Joy have three children. His two sons, Roberto and Rafael, boxed as teenagers but lost interest in the sport after they migrated to the United States.
