= Robert Ciba =

Polish boxer

Personal information
- Nationality: Polish
- Born: 29 November 1969 (age 56) Chmielnik, Poland

Sport
- Sport: Boxing
Medal record
Men's amateur boxing
Representing Poland
European Championships
Bronze medal – third place	1989 Athens	Bantamweight

Robert Ciba (born 29 November 1969) is a Polish boxer. He competed in the men's bantamweight event at the 1992 Summer Olympics.
