= Kim Jae-kyung (boxer) =

South Korean boxer

Personal information
- Nationality: South Korean
- Born: 25 October 1969 (age 56)

Sport
- Sport: Boxing
Medal record
Men's amateur boxing
Representing South Korea
Asian Amateur Boxing Championships
Gold medal – first place	1992 Bangkok	Light-welterweight

Kim Jae-kyung (born 25 October 1969) is a South Korean former boxer. He qualified to compete in the men's light-welterweight division at the 1992 Summer Olympics when he reached the semi-finals in the same weight category at the 1992 Asian Amateur Boxing Championships. Kim went on to win the gold medal at the event in Bangkok, Thailand. Despite high hopes among the Korean media for his chances at the Olympics in Barcelona, he lost his first round bout against Andreas Zülow of Germany.
