= Mwanamwambwa =

Mwanamwambwa is a surname. Notable people with the surname include:

- Amusaa Mwanamwambwa (1940–2023), Zambian politician
- Marvin Sitwala Mwanamwambwa (born 1954) Retired Deputy Chief Justice of the Republic of Zambia and current Judge President of the COMESA Court of Justice
- Ngozi Mwanamwambwa (born 1971), Zambian sprinter
