= Javier Calderón =

Mexican boxer (born 1971)

Personal information
- Full name: Javier Calderón Alfaro
- Nationality: Mexican
- Born: 20 November 1971 (age 54) Reynosa, Mexico

Sport
- Sport: Boxing
Medal record
Representing Mexico
Pan American Games
Bronze medal – third place	1991 Havana	Bantamweight

Javier Calderón Alfaro (born 20 November 1971) is a Mexican former professional boxer who competed from 1993 to 1998. As an amateur, he competed in the men's bantamweight event at the 1992 Summer Olympics. Calderón won six amateur national championships and a bronze medal at the 1991 Pan American Games.
