= Miguel Dias =

Dutch boxer

Medal record

Representing Netherlands

Men's Boxing

European Amateur Championships
Silver medal – second place	1991 Gothenburg	Bantamweight

Miguel Brito dos Reis Dias (born April 1, 1968, in Santa Maria) is a retired boxer from The Netherlands, who was born on Cape Verde. He represented the Netherlands at the 1992 Summer Olympics in Barcelona, Spain, where he was eliminated in the first round of the bantamweight division (– 54 kg) by Tunisia's Riadh Klai. A year earlier, at the 1991 European Amateur Boxing Championships, he won the silver medal in his weight category. Dias became a pro in 1995, and retired in 2002 with a record of nine wins (8 ko's) and one loss.
