= Oleg Nikolayev (boxer) =

Soviet boxer

Personal information
- Nationality: Soviet
- Born: 10 April 1968; Magadan, Russia
- Died: 27 November 1999 (aged 31); Moscow, Russia

Sport
- Sport: Boxing

Oleg Nikolayev (10 April 1968 – 27 November 1999) was a Soviet boxer. He competed in the men's light welterweight event at the 1992 Summer Olympics.
