= László Szűcs (boxer) =

Hungarian boxer

Lászlo Szücs
Personal information
- Nationality: Hungarian
- Born: 27 October 1969 (age 55); Hungary
- Height: 176 cm (5 ft 9 in)
- Weight: 64 kg (141 lb)

Sport
- Country: Hungary
- Sport: Boxing

Lászlo Szücs is a Hungarian Olympic boxer. He represented his country in the light-welterweight division at the 1992 Summer Olympics. He won his first bout against Trevor Shailer, his second bout against Daniel Fulanse, and then lost his third bout to Jyri Kjäll.
