= Édgar Ruiz =

Mexican boxer (born 1973)

Personal information
- Nickname: Dandy
- Born: Édgar Israel Ruiz Burgos; 11 February 1973 (age 53) Los Mochis, Mexico
- Height: 1.77 m (5 ft 10 in)

Boxing career
- Reach: 175 cm (69 in)
- Stance: Orthodox

Boxing record
- Total fights: 33
- Wins: 22
- Win by KO: 14
- Losses: 10
- Draws: 1
Medal record
Men's amateur boxing
Representing Mexico
Pan American Games
Silver medal – second place	1991 Havana	Light welterweight

Édgar Israel Ruiz Burgos (born 11 February 1973) is a Mexican former professional boxer who competed from 1992 to 2011. As an amateur, he competed in the men's light welterweight event at the 1992 Summer Olympics. He made his amateur debut at the age of 14.
