= Venkatesan Devarajan =

Indian boxer

Devarajan Venkatesan
Personal information
- Full name: Venkatesh Devarajan
- Nationality: Indian
- Born: 22 July 1973 (age 53) Chennai, Tamil Nadu, India

Sport
- Sport: Boxing

Venkatesan Devarajan (born 22 July 1973) is an Indian boxer and Olympian. He is from Chennai, India. He won the bronze medal in the 1994 World Boxing Championship in Bangkok. He was the first Indian boxer win the world cup boxing championship Medalist at foreign soil. He was awarded the Arjuna Award in 1995. He competed in the men's bantamweight event at the 1992 Summer Olympics. He received the Best Sportsman Award from Indian Railways in 1995.
