= Dillon Carew =

Guyanese boxer (born 1970)

Personal information
- Nationality: Guyanese
- Born: 15 September 1970 (age 54); Georgetown, Guyana
- Height: 176 cm (5 ft 9 in)
- Weight: 63 kg (139 lb)

Sport
- Country: Guyana
- Sport: Boxing

Dillon Carew (born 15 September 1970) is a Guyanese former professional boxer who competed from 1992 to 2007. As an amateur, he represented his country in the light-welterweight division at the 1992 Summer Olympics. He won his first bout against Rafael Romero of the Dominican Republic, and then lost his second bout to Mark Leduc of Canada.

== Professional Boxing ==
Dillon's first competitive outing was the under-16 championship in 1984.

Carew continued on to a professional boxing career and was crowned national lightweight champion when he defeated Glen Forde. He went undefeated for the first eight fights in his professional career until losing to Moses James on January 11, 1995 in his first overseas professional bout in Quebec, Canada. He became the national junior welterweight champion on February 26, 1995 by winning a 12-round decision over Barrington Cambridge.

He went up against Meldrick Taylor, Ricky Hatton and Diosbelys Hurtado during his 15 year career. He ended with 20 victories, 17 defeats and three draws.

== Post-career ==
His post-fight boxing career includes attending ringside injuries and training boxers since 2006. He trained Wayne Braithwaite and Sonya Lamonakis in Brooklyn, New York.

== Family ==
His brother, Gordon Carew, also represented Guyana in lightweight-division boxing at the 1984 Summer Olympics.

Carew and his wife Genese live in Connecticut. He has four sons, two of which are from a previous marriage.
