= Sandeep Gollen =

Indian boxer

Personal information
- Nationality: Indian
- Born: 27 May 1972 (age 53)

Sport
- Sport: Boxing

Sandeep Gollen (born 27 May 1972) is an Indian boxer. He competed in the men's light welterweight event at the 1992 Summer Olympics.
