= Daniel Fulanse =

Zambian boxer (born 1962)

Personal information
- Nationality: Zambian
- Born: 5 February 1962 (age 63)

Sport
- Sport: Boxing

Daniel Fulanse (born 5 February 1962) is a Zambian boxer. He competed in the men's light welterweight event at the 1992 Summer Olympics.
