= Dildar Ahmed =

Pakistani boxer

Dildar Ahmed is a Pakistani heavyweight boxer. He was born in a village of Faisalabad named Chak No. 571 G.B. He is now living in Rehman Town in Faisalabad. His height is 6 ft 8 inches. He has won 9 gold medals in international competitions. He has also won 2 gold medals in SAF games. His boxing career spanned from 1987 to 1993. He retired from Pakistan Army in 1997. In 2010 Ahmed received a financial grant from the Pakistan Sports Board.
