= Joseph Chongo =

Zambian boxer (born 1965)

Personal information
- Nationality: Zambian
- Born: 25 January 1965 (age 61)

Sport
- Sport: Boxing

Joseph Chongo (born 25 January 1965) is a Zambian boxer. He competed at the 1988 Summer Olympics, 1992 Summer Olympics and the 1996 Summer Olympics.
