= Mourad Malaoui =

Algerian volleyball player (born 1968)

Personal information
- Nationality: Algerian
- Born: 14 March 1968 (age 57)

Sport
- Sport: Volleyball

Mourad Malaoui (born 14 March 1968) is an Algerian volleyball player. He competed in the men's tournament at the 1992 Summer Olympics.
