= Arlo Chavez =

Filipino boxer

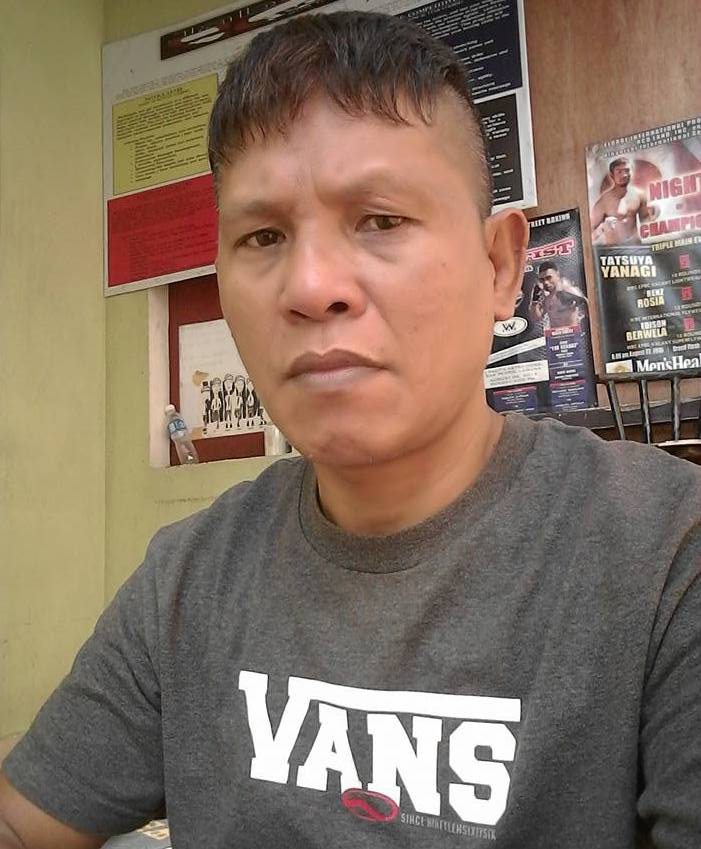
- Arlo Chavez in 2016

Personal information
- Nationality: Filipino
- Born: August 1, 1966 (age 59) Bantayan Island, Cebu, Philippines
- Height: 5 ft 7 in (169 cm)
- Weight: 139 lb (63 kg)

Sport
- Sport: Boxing
- Weight class: Light Welterweight, Welterweight
Medal record
Men's Boxing
Representing the Philippines
Asian Games
Bronze medal – third place	1990 Beijing	Light Welterweight
Asian Amateur Boxing Championships
Gold medal – first place	1991 Bangkok	Light Welterweight
Southeast Asian Games
Gold medal – first place	1989 Kuala Lumpur	Light Welterweight
Gold medal – first place	1991 Manila	Light Welterweight
Gold medal – first place	1993 Singapore	Welterweight
Gold medal – first place	1995 Chiang Mai	Welterweight

Arlo Chavez (born August 1, 1966) is a Filipino boxer who competed at the 1992 Summer Olympics. He is a gold medalist in the Asian Amateur Boxing Championships and is the most successful Filipino boxer in the Southeast Asian Games with four gold medals.

== Personal life ==
Arlo Chavez was born on August 1, 1966 in Bantayan Island in Cebu. The eldest of 10 children, Chavez became the head of their family when he was just a teenager after their parents died just a year within each other. He and his brother Ronald, who was also a member of the national boxing team, provided for their other siblings. He studied at Southwestern University in Cebu City.

== Career ==
Chavez captured a gold medal in the light welterweight division at the 1989 Southeast Asian Games in his first major international competition. He defeated Thai Arnit Suwanwijit in the final. A month after the SEA Games, Chavez was sent to the 1989 World Amateur Boxing Championships in Moscow along with Leopoldo Serantes and Isidro Vicera. He lost to Poland's Dariusz Czernij in his opening bout.

The following year, Chavez won a bronze medal at the 1990 Asian Games in Beijing. He defeated Pakistani Atta Ullah Durrani in his opening bout before losing to eventual gold medalist Ahmad Mayez Khanji of Syria in the semifinal.

At the 1991 Asian Amateur Boxing Championship in Bangkok, Chavez topped the light welterweight category. Later that year, Chavez successfully defended his light welterweight title in the 1991 Southeast Asian Games in Manila.

The following year, he qualified for the 1992 Summer Olympics. He defeated Nigerian James Mozez in his first bout before losing to Romanian Leonard Doroftei in his next outing.

Chavez won his third gold medal in the Southeast Asian Games in 1993, this time ruling the welterweight division in Singapore.

Chavez competed at the 1994 Asian Games in Hiroshima but lost to Uzbekistan’s Nariman Atayev in the quarterfinals and went home empty-handed.

Chavez won a record fourth gold medal in the Southeast Asian Games in 1995 after topping the welterweight division in Chiang Mai. He was the only Filipino boxer to win a gold medal in the competition. His semifinal win over Thai Arkhom Chenglai prevented the hosts from sweeping all 12 gold medals at stake in the sport.

Chavez retired after failing to qualify for the 1996 Summer Olympics. He now works as a boxing instructor in Metro Manila.

=== Results ===
1992 Summer Olympics

Event	Round	Result	Opponent	Score
Welterweight	First	Win	(Nigeria) James Mozez	12-6
Welterweight	Second	Loss	(Romania) Leonard Doroftei	1-15
