= Khamsavath Vilayphone =

Laotian boxer (born 1967)

Personal information
- Nationality: Laotian
- Born: 9 April 1967 (age 58)

Sport
- Sport: Boxing

Khamsavath Vilayphone (born 9 April 1967) is a Laotian boxer. He was a medalist at the 1992 Asian Amateur Boxing Championships and competed in the men's light welterweight event at the 1992 Summer Olympics.
