= Lies Tizioualou =

Algerian volleyball player (born 1965)

Personal information
- Nationality: Algerian
- Born: 25 March 1965 (age 60)

Sport
- Sport: Volleyball

Lies Tizioualou (born 25 March 1965) is an Algerian volleyball player. He competed in the men's tournament at the 1992 Summer Olympics.
