= Foudil Taalba =

Algerian volleyball player (born 1967)

Personal information
- Nationality: Algerian
- Born: 18 January 1967 (age 58)

Sport
- Sport: Volleyball

Foudil Taalba (born 18 January 1967) is an Algerian volleyball player. He competed in the men's tournament at the 1992 Summer Olympics.
