= Vladislav Antonov (boxer) =

Russian boxer (born 1966)

Personal information
- Nationality: Russian
- Born: 5 December 1966 (age 58); Leningrad, Russian SFSR, Soviet Union

Sport
- Sport: Boxing

Vladislav Antonov (born 5 December 1966) is a Russian boxer. He competed in the men's bantamweight event at the 1992 Summer Olympics.
