= Jesús Pérez (boxer) =

Colombian boxer

Jesús Salvador Pérez Llerena (born December 25, 1971, in Córdoba, Bolívar) is a retired male boxer from Colombia, who competed in the bantamweight division (– 54 kg) during his career. He represented his native country at the 1992 Summer Olympics in Barcelona, where he was defeated in the first round of the men's bantamweight competition by France's Philippe Wartelle (5:12).
