= Ahmed Aboud =

Iraqi boxer (born 1970)

Personal information
- Nationality: Iraqi
- Born: 1 April 1970 (age 54); Iraq
- Height: 170 cm (5 ft 7 in)
- Weight: 51 kg (112 lb)

Sport
- Country: Iraq
- Sport: Boxing

Ahmed Ghmin Aboud is an Iraqi Olympic boxer. He represented his country in the bantamweight division at the 1992 Summer Olympics. His first round he had a bye and then lost his first bout to Wayne McCullough.
