= Godfrey Wakaabu =

Ugandan boxer

Personal information
- Nationality: Ugandan
- Born: 1 January 1970 (age 55)

Sport
- Sport: Boxing

Godfrey Wakaabu (born 1 January 1970) is a Ugandan boxer. He competed in the men's light welterweight event at the 1992 Summer Olympics.
