= Chatree Suwanyod =

Thai boxer

Personal information
- Nationality: Thai
- Born: 23 December 1965 (age 59)

Sport
- Sport: Boxing

Chatree Suwanyod (born 23 December 1965) is a Thai boxer. He competed in the men's bantamweight event at the 1992 Summer Olympics.
