= Remigio Molina =

Argentine boxer (1970–2016)

Personal information
- Nickname: El Ché
- Born: Remigio Daniel Molina Ferreyra; 6 November 1970 Concordia, Entre Ríos, Argentina
- Died: 18 September 2016 (aged 45) Concordia, Entre Ríos, Argentina
- Height: 173 cm (5 ft 8 in)
- Weight: Lightweight; Super Featherweight; Featherweight; Super Bantamweight

Boxing career
- Reach: 178 cm (70 in)
- Stance: Southpaw

Boxing record
- Total fights: 47
- Wins: 38
- Win by KO: 14
- Losses: 8
- Draws: 1
- No contests: 0

Remigio Daniel Molina Ferreyra (6 November 1970 – 18 September 2016) was an Argentine professional boxer in the Lightweight division. He also represented Argentina at the 1992 Barcelona Olympic Games.

== Biography ==
Molina had a successful amateur career and represented Argentina at the 1992 Barcelona Olympic Games, losing against Mohammed Achik in the quarterfinals.

In April 1998, Remigio was knocked out by WBC Super Bantamweight champion Érik Morales in Tijuana.

Molina died in Concordia in September 2016 while playing a football match.

== Professional boxing record ==
38 Wins (14 knockouts), 8 Losses, 1 Draw
Res.	Record	Opponent	Type	Rd., Time	Date	Location	Notes
Loss	38-8-1	(France) Levan Kirakosyan	RTD	5 (12)	2005-07-12	Espace 3000, Hyeres, Var, France	
Win	38-7-1	(Argentina) Jorge Daniel Medina	MD	10 (10)	2005-05-06	Centro Deportivo Municipal, Tierra del Fuego, Argentina	
Loss	37-7-1	(Argentina) Juan Gerardo Cabrera	KO	4 (10)	2003-02-08	Club Caza y Pesca, Villa Carlos Paz, Cordoba, Argentina	
Loss	37-6-1	(Argentina) Juan Gerardo Cabrera	SD	10 (10)	2002-08-17	Estadio F.A.B., Buenos Aires, Distrito Federal, Argentina	
Win	37-5-1	(Argentina) Nestor Martin Farias	SD	10 (10)	2002-07-06	Estadio F.A.B., Buenos Aires, Distrito Federal, Argentina	
Win	36-5-1	(Argentina) Julio Gonzalez	MD	6 (6)	2002-02-15	Club Social y Deportivo Mar de Ajó, Mar de Ajo, Buenos Aires, Argentina	
Loss	35-5-1	(Argentina) Pastor Humberto Maurin	DQ	2 (10)	2000-04-29	Club Argentino de Quilmes, Quilmes, Buenos Aires, Argentina	
Loss	35-4-1	(Mexico) Juan Manuel Marquez	TKO	8 (10)	1999-11-20	(United States) Hard Rock Hotel and Casino, Las Vegas, Nevada, USA	
Draw	35-3-1	(Argentina) Miguel Angel Albarado	TD	7 (8)	1999-06-11	Concordia, Entre Rios, Argentina	
Win	35-3	(Argentina) Rodolfo Sergio Javier Lauria	DQ	3 (8)	1999-05-15	Berazategui, Buenos Aires, Argentina	
Loss	34-3	(Argentina) Julio Pablo Chacon	DQ	8 (12)	1999-01-20	Club Atletico Quilmes, Mar del Plata, Buenos Aires, Argentina	
Win	34-2	(Argentina) Miguel Angel Albarado	PTS	10 (10)	1998-12-04	Estudios Canal 9 TV, Buenos Aires, Distrito Federal, Argentina	
Win	33-2	(Bolivia) Renor Rojas Claure	TKO	7 (8)	1998-08-15	Estudios Canal 9 TV, Buenos Aires, Distrito Federal, Argentina	
Win	32-2	(Argentina) Ruben Ricardo Astorga	TKO	4 (10)	1998-06-06	Buenos Aires, Distrito Federal, Argentina	
Loss	31-2	(Mexico) Erik Morales	TKO	6 (12)	1998-04-03	Tijuana, Baja California, Mexico	For WBC super-bantamweight title.
Win	31-1	(Argentina) Ruben Osvaldo Condori	SD	10 (10)	1998-02-07	Buenos Aires, Distrito Federal, Argentina	
Win	30-1	(Bolivia) Renor Rojas Claure	PTS	10 (10)	1997-12-13	Buenos Aires, Distrito Federal, Argentina	
Win	29-1	(Argentina) Sergio Rafael Liendo	TD	9 (10)	1997-09-27	Buenos Aires, Distrito Federal, Argentina	
Win	28-1	(Argentina) Ruben Osvaldo Condori	PTS	10 (10)	1997-06-07	Estudios Canal 9 TV, Buenos Aires, Distrito Federal, Argentina	
Loss	27-1	(United Kingdom) Naseem Hamed	TKO	2 (12)	1996-11-09	Nynex Arena, Manchester, Lancashire, United Kingdom	For WBO World featherweight title.
