= Dieter Berg =

East German boxer

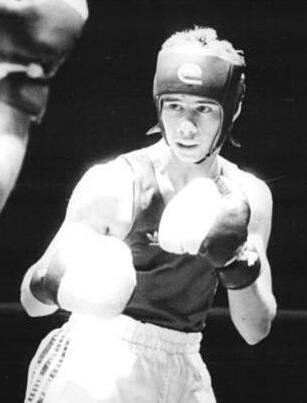
- Berg in 1984

Personal information
- Nationality: German
- Born: 11 June 1966 (age 59); Hagenow, East Germany

Sport
- Sport: Boxing

Dieter Berg (born 11 June 1966) is a German former boxer. He competed in the men's bantamweight event at the 1992 Summer Olympics.

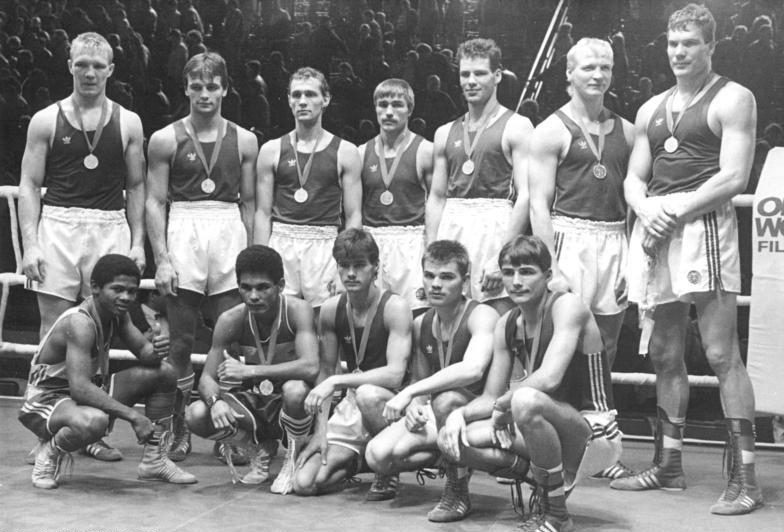
Dieter Berg, Marco Rudolph and Andreas Zülow at the awards ceremony of the 1989 Chemistry Cup
