= Kalai Riadh =

Tunisian boxer (born 1968)

Personal information
- Nationality: Tunisian
- Born: 12 December 1968 (age 56)

Sport
- Sport: Boxing

Kalai Riadh (born 12 December 1968) is a Tunisian boxer. He competed at the 1992 Summer Olympics and the 1996 Summer Olympics.
