= Mourad Sennoun =

Algerian volleyball player (born 1962)

Personal information
- Nationality: Algerian
- Born: 29 January 1962 (age 63)

Sport
- Sport: Volleyball

Mourad Sennoun (born 29 January 1962) is an Algerian volleyball player. He competed in the men's tournament at the 1992 Summer Olympics.
