= Philippe Wartelle =

French boxer

Philippe Wartelle is a French Olympic boxer. He represented his country in the bantamweight division at the 1992 Summer Olympics. He won his first bout against Jesús Salvador Pérez, and then lost his second bout to Roberto Jalnaiz.
