= Sergio Reyes Jr. =

American boxer

Personal information
- Nationality: American
- Born: October 28, 1969 (age 56) Fort Worth, Texas, United States

Sport
- Sport: Boxing

Sergio Reyes Jr. (born October 28, 1969) is an American boxer. He competed in the men's bantamweight event at the 1992 Summer Olympics. As of
