= Edwin Cassiani =

Colombian boxer

Personal information
- Full name: Edwin Cassiani Tejedor
- Nationality: Colombia
- Born: October 28, 1972 (age 53) San Basilio de Palenque, Casanare
- Height: 1.82 m (5 ft 11 1/2 in)
- Weight: 64 kg (141 lb)

Sport
- Sport: Boxing
- Weight class: Light Welterweight

Edwin Cassiani Tejedor (born October 28, 1972, in San Basilio de Palenque, Mahates) is a retired male boxer from Colombia, who competed in the light-welterweight division (– 63.5 kg) during his career. He represented his native country at the 1992 Summer Olympics in Barcelona, Spain, where he was defeated in the first round of the men's light-welterweight competition by Cuba's eventual gold medalist Héctor Vinent (4:27).
