= Moses James =

Nigerian boxer

Personal information
- Nationality: Nigerian
- Born: 25 June 1968 (age 57)

Sport
- Sport: Boxing

Moses Opute James, also known as Eagle (born 25 June 1968) is a Nigerian boxer. He competed in the men's light welterweight event at the 1992 Summer Olympics.
