= Zhang Guangping =

Chinese boxer

Personal information
- Nationality: Chinese
- Born: 18 July 1964 (age 60); China

Sport
- Sport: Boxing

Zhang Guangping (born 18 July 1964) is a Chinese boxer. He competed in the men's bantamweight event at the 1992 Summer Olympics.
