= Jyri Kjäll =

Finnish boxer (born 1969)

Personal information
- Full name: Jyri Göran Kjäll
- Nationality: Finland
- Born: 13 January 1969 (age 57) Seinäjoki
- Height: 1.80 m (5 ft 11 in)
- Weight: 67 kg (148 lb)

Sport
- Sport: Boxing
- Weight class: Light Welterweight
- Club: Porin NMKY
Medal record
Olympic Games
Bronze medal – third place	1992 Barcelona	Light Welterweight
World Amateur Championships
Silver medal – second place	1993 Tampere	Light Welterweight

Jyri Göran Kjäll (born 13 January 1969) is a Finnish former boxer who won the bronze medal in the light welterweight division at the 1992 Summer Olympics. A year later he captured the silver medal at the 1993 World Amateur Boxing Championships in Tampere, Finland.

Kjäll turned pro in 1994, moved to Florida, and had limited success. Although he retired in 2002 with a career record with 23-1-0 with 18 KO's and fought frequently in the US, his career never built up momentum for a title shot. His lone defeat was a 1st-round TKO to future contender Juan Carlos Candelo.
