= Laïd Bouneb =

Algerian boxer (born 1972)

Personal information
- Nationality: Algerian
- Born: 8 November 1972 (age 52)

Sport
- Sport: Boxing

Laïd Bouneb (born 8 November 1972) is an Algerian boxer. He competed in the men's light welterweight event at the 1992 Summer Olympics.
