= Christopher Henry =

Barbadian boxer (born 1973)

Personal information
- Born: 19 January 1973 (age 53) Saint Lucy, Barbados
- Height: 182 cm (6 ft 0 in)
- Weight: 63 kg (139 lb)

Sport
- Country: Barbados
- Sport: Boxing
Medal record
Men's boxing
Representing Barbados
Central American and Caribbean Games
| Bronze medal – third place | 1993 Ponce | Welterweight |

Christopher Henry (born 19 January 1973) is a Barbadian Olympic boxer. He represented his country in the light-welterweight division at the 1992 Summer Olympics. He won his first bout against Dong Seidu of Ghana, and then lost his second bout to Laid Bouneb of Algeria.
