= Slimane Zengli =

Algerian boxer (born 1965)

Personal information
- Nationality: Algerian
- Born: 17 April 1965 (age 61)

Sport
- Sport: Boxing

Slimane Zengli (born 17 April 1965) is an Algerian boxer. He competed at the 1988 Summer Olympics and the 1992 Summer Olympics.
