= List of WBU world champions =

The following is a list of WBU world champions, a table showing the world champions certificated by the World Boxing Union (WBU), founded in the United States in 1995. This does not includes champions of the identically named German based organization that was active in the 2010s.

^{r} – Champion relinquished title.
^{s} – Champion stripped of title.

== List of WBU Champions ==
WBU heavyweight champions have included:

| Name | Duration of reign | Defenses | Notes |
|---|---|---|---|
| (United States) George Foreman | March 29, 1995 – 1997 | 2 | Foreman was recognized as champion after he was stripped of the IBF title |
| (South Africa) Corrie Sanders | November 15, 1997 – May 20, 2000 | 3 | Defeated Ross Purity |
| (United States) Hasim Rahman | May 20, 2000 – April 21, 2001 | 0 | Relinquished the title in order to fight Lennox Lewis for the IBF, IBO and WBC titles |
| (United Kingdom) Johnny Nelson | November 24, 2001 – December 4, 2001 | 0 | Defeated Alexander Vasiliev. Relinquished the title in order to concentrate on defending his WBO Cruiserweight title |
| (Georgia (country)) Georgi Kandelaki | December 21, 2002 – January 2004 | 0 | Defeated Alexander Vasiliev. Kandelaki either relinquished or was stripped of the title |
| (United Kingdom) Matt Skelton | February 25, 2005 – January 26, 2009 | 0 | Skelton relinquished the title |

=== Cruiserweight ===
| Name | Duration of reign | Defenses | Notes |
|---|---|---|---|
| (United States) Thomas Hearns | March 31, 1995 –1996 | 0 | Won vacant title |
| (United States) James Toney | February 22, 1997 –1997 | 0 | Won vacant title |
| (Netherlands) Don Diego Poeder | June 14, 1997 –1997 | 1 | Won vacant title |
| (South Africa) Jacob Mofokeng | September 12, 1998 –1999 | 0 | Won vacant title |
| (Italy) Vincenzo Cantatore | March 20, 1999 –March 1999 | 0 | Won vacant title |
| (United Kingdom) Rob Norton | April 1, 1999 –24 September 1999 | 0 | Won vacant title |
| (South Africa) Sebastiaan Rothmann | 24 September 1999 –2003 | 6 | |
| (United Kingdom) Enzo Maccarinelli | 28 June 2003 –2006 | 7 | Won vacant title |
| (United Kingdom) Mark Hobson | 8 September 2006 –2009 | 0 | Won vacant title |

=== Light-Heavyweight ===
| Name | Duration of reign | Defenses | Notes |
|---|---|---|---|
| (United States) James Toney | June 18, 1995 –6 December 1996 | 3 | Won vacant title |
| (United States) Montell Griffin | 6 December 1996 –1997 | 0 | |
| (United States) Frank Tate | 30 August 1997 –? | 0 | Won vacant title |
| (Argentina) Dario Walter Matteoni | 2 March 2000 –? | 0 | Won vacant title |
| (United Kingdom) Tony Oakey | 4 March 2002 –11 October 2003 | 3 | Won vacant title |
| (United Kingdom) Matthew Barney | 11 October 2003 –? | 0 | |

=== Super-Middleweight ===
| Name | Duration of reign | Defenses | Notes |
|---|---|---|---|
| (United States) Thomas Tate | 21 November 1995 –1996 | 0 | Won vacant title |
| (United States) Vinny Pazienza | 23 August 1996 –1998 | 0 | Won vacant title |
| (Germany) Norbert Nieroba | 18 April 1998 – 8 May 1999 | 0 | Won vacant title |
| (Netherlands) Nordin Ben Salah | 8 May 1999 – 2000 | 0 | |
| (Italy) Silvio Branco | 15 April 2000 – ? | 1 | Won vacant title |
| (Georgia (country)) Eric Teymour | 24 November 2004 – ? | 0 | Won vacant title |

=== Middleweight ===
| Name | Duration of reign | Defenses | Notes |
|---|---|---|---|
| (United States) Dana Rosenblatt | 13 April 1996 –1996 | 0 | Won vacant title |
| (Italy) Silvio Branco | 19 September 1996 –18 December 1998 | 6 | |
| (Italy) Agostino Cardemone | 18 December 1998 –26 June 1999 | 1 | |
| (Netherlands) Raymond Joval | 26 June 1999 –13 December 1999 | 0 | |
| (Italy) Antonio Perugino | 13 December 1999 –2000 | 0 | |
| (Australia) Kevin Kelly | 5 May 2000 –2000 | 0 | Won vacant title |
| (Italy) Antonio Perugino | 3 June 2000 –? | 0 | Won vacant title |
| (South Africa) Ruben Groenewald | 6 June 2002 –28 September 2002 | 0 | Won vacant title |
| (United Kingdom) Anthony Farnell | 28 September 2002 –5 April 2003 | 1 | |
| (United Kingdom) Wayne Ellcock | 5 April 2003 –29 November 2003 | 0 | |
| (United Kingdom) Lawrence Murphy | 29 November 2003 –6 March 2004 | 0 | |
| (United Kingdom) Anthony Farnell | 6 March 2004 –12 June 2004 | 0 | |
| (Portugal) Eugenio Monteiro | 12 June 2004 –? | 0 | |
| (United Kingdom) Gary Lockett | 11 March 2006 –? | 2 | |

=== Light-Middleweight ===
| Name | Duration of reign | Defenses | Notes |
|---|---|---|---|
| (United States) Emmett Linton | 3 November –1996 | 1 | Won vacant title |
| (United States) Verno Phillips | 21 May 1997 –1998 | 2 | Won vacant title |
| (Tanzania) Rashid Matumla | 19 December 1998 –? | 1 | Won vacant title |
| (Iran) Takaloo | 7 July 2001 –17 August 2002 | 2 | Won vacant title |
| (Puerto Rico) Daniel Santos | 17 August 2002 –2002 | 0 | |
| (Iran) Takaloo | 2 January 2003 –10 September 2004 | 1 | Won vacant title |
| (United Kingdom) Wayne Alexander | 10 September 2004–? | 1 | |

=== Welterweight ===
| Name | Duration of reign | Defenses | Notes |
|---|---|---|---|
| (South Africa) Gary Murray | 26 August 1995 –26 October 1996 | 4 | Won vacant title |
| (Italy) Alessandro Duran | 26 October 1996 –30 July 1997 | 1 | |
| (South Africa) Peter Malinga | 30 July 1997 –17 November 1997 | 0 | |
| (Italy) Alessandro Duran | 17 November 1997 –5 May 1998 | 0 | |
| (Italy) Michele Piccirillo | 5 May 1998 –2001 | 8 | |
| (South Africa) Jan Piet Bergman | 2 June 2001 –2003 | 3 | Won Vacant Title |
| (Republic of Ireland) Eamonn Magee | 6 October 2003 –20 May 2006 | 1 | Won Vacant Title |
| (Iran) Takaloo | 20 May 2008 –7 April 2010 | | |
| (United States) Ben Reiter | 7 April 2010 –May 2015 | 10 | |
| (Argentina) Cristian Charquero | 15 June 2015 –May 2016 | 5 | Won Vacant Title |
| (Slovakia) Tomas Valko | 10 May 2016 –2016 | | Won Unification world Title |

=== Light-Welterweight ===
| Name | Duration of reign | Defenses | Notes |
|---|---|---|---|
| (United Kingdom) Shea Neary | 26 October 1996 –11 March 2000 | 5 | Vacant title |
| (United States) Micky Ward | 11 March 2000 –2000 | 0 | |
| (United Kingdom) Jason Rowland | 21 October 2000 –2001 | 0 | Vacant title |
| (United Kingdom) Ricky Hatton | 26 March 2001 –? | 15 | Vacant title |
| (United Kingdom) Lee McAllister | 29 March 2008 –? | 0 | Vacant title |

=== Lightweight ===
| Name | Duration of reign | Defenses | Notes |
|---|---|---|---|
| (Sweden) George Scott | 7 October 1995 –1997 | 4 | Vacant title |
| (United Kingdom) Colin Dunne | 28 November 1997 –7 December 2002 | 7 | Vacant title |
| (United Kingdom) David Burke | 7 December 2002 –2003 | 0 | |
| (Bulgaria) Toncho Tonchev | 31 March 2004 –? | 0 | Vacant title |
| (United Kingdom) Graham Earl | 28 October 2006 –? | 0 | Vacant title |
| (United Kingdom) Lee McAllister | 6 October 2008 –? | 0 | Vacant title |
| (United Kingdom) Willie Limond | 29 March 2009 –? | 0 | Vacant title |

=== Super-Featherweight ===
| Name | Duration of reign | Defenses | Notes |
|---|---|---|---|
| (United States) Angel Manfredy | 18 October 1995 –1998 | 7 | Vacant title |
| (Argentina) Jorge Rodrigo Barrios | 10 July 1997 –2001 | 2 | Vacant title |
| (South Africa) Phillip Ndou | 25 July 2001 –2002 | 3 | Vacant title |
| (United Kingdom) Kevin Lear | I May 2002 –2003 | 1 | Vacant title |
| (United Kingdom) Michael Gomez | 3 April 2004 –11 February 2005 | 2 | Vacant title |

=== Featherweight ===
| Name | Duration of reign | Defenses | Notes |
|---|---|---|---|
| (United States) Kevin Kelley | 2 February 1996 –1998 | 4 | Vacant title |
| (South Africa) Cassius Baloyi | 22 April 1998 –2001 | 7 | Vacant title |
| (South Africa) Lehlo Ledwaba | 27 July 2002 –? | 0 | Vacant title |
| (United Kingdom) Stephen Foster | 11 May 2005 –14 October 2006 | 1 | |
| (United Kingdom) Derry Matthews | 14 October 2006–5 April 2008 | 2 | |
| (Mongolia) Choi Tseveenpurev | 5 April 2008–? | 0; | |

=== Super-Bantamweight ===
| Name | Duration of reign | Defenses | Notes |
|---|---|---|---|
| (United States) Kennedy McKinney | 26 August 1995 –1996 | 0 | Vacant title |
| (United States) Max Gomez | 16 March 1996 –9 June 1996 | 0 | Vacant title |
| (United States) Frankie Toledo | 9 June 1996 –15 November 1996 | 0 | |
| (South Africa) Cassius Baloyi | 15 November 1996 –1998 | 3 | |
| (United States) Carlos Navarro | 21 February 1998 –11 December 1999 | 2 | |
| (Mexico) Carlos Contreras | 11 December 1999 –2001 | 1 | |
| (Australia) Nedal Hussein | 29 June 2001 –? | 0 | Vacant Title |

=== Bantamweight ===
| Name | Duration of reign | Defenses | Notes |
|---|---|---|---|
| (Mexico) Epraim Pintor | 5 August 1995 –? | 0 | Vacant title |
| (Thailand) Sirimongkhon Iamthuam | 23 December 1995 –1996 | 1 | Vacant title |
| (South Africa) Lehlo Ledwaba | 17 November 1996 –1997 | 1 | Vacant title |
| (South Africa) Patrick Quka | 2 August 1997 –5 June 1998 | 0 | Vacant title |
| (Denmark) Johnny Bredahl | 5 June 1998 –? | 0 | |
| (United Kingdom) Johnny Armour | 9 December 2000 –5 July 2003 | 3 | Vacant Title |
| (Australia) Nathan Sting | 5 July 2003 –? | 0 | |

== See also ==
- List of IBF world champions
- List of WBA world champions
- List of WBC world champions
- List of WBO world champions
