= Dean Pithie =

British boxer (born 1974)

Personal information
- Nickname: "The Pitbull"
- Nationality: British
- Born: Dean Pithie; 18 January 1974 (age 52) Coventry, England
- Weight: super featherweight

Boxing career
- Stance: Orthodox

Boxing record
- Total fights: 14
- Wins: 14
- Win by KO: 6
- Losses: 0
- Draws: 0
- No contests: 0

Dean Pithie (born 18 January 1974) is a male British former professional boxer who fought in the super featherweight division. He is a former Commonwealth and WBO Inter-Continental super featherweight champion.

== Boxing career ==
Hailing from Willenhall ABC in Willenhall, Coventry Pithie won the 1994 ABA featherweight title. Highlights in his amateur career included defeating future world champion Prince Naseem Hamed. He represented England in the 57 kg division, at the 1994 Commonwealth Games in Victoria, British Columbia, Canada.

Pithie turned professional in February 1995 at the Tryst Sports Centre, Cumbernauld, Scotland. In his debut Pithie defeated Doncaster's Colin McAuley with a third round knockout and knocked out McAuley again in his second fight.

Dean Pithie won 12 of his next 13 fights, drawing the other with Kelton McKenzie. He avenged this draw in his next fight. This brought his record to 15-0-1 (7 KO). He fought Stefy Bull in his next fight for the WBO Intercontinental Championship, disposing of Bull by the way of TKO. Pithie made one defence of his title before being beaten by Gary Thornhill to record his first professional defeat. Pithie managed to put himself back into contention for minor belts with two successive wins after this defeat, and earned at shot at Andrew Matabola for his WBC international title. However Pithie was defeated by way of 8th Round TKO. Pithie claimed the WBC International title in his next fight however, avenging his loss at the hands of Matabola by 2nd round TKO. Pithie was rated alongside the best featherweights in the country, and was tipped in some circles for British, European, and possibly world honours eventually.

After 2 defences, Pithie fought Michael Gomez for the British Super Featherweight title, losing on points. After a draw with Jim Wiseman at Skydome, Coventry, Dean fought a Frenchman by the name of Afif Djelti for the IBO super featherweight world title. Pithie was knocked out in 6 rounds.

Pithie went on to win the Commonwealth title, defeating Liverpudlian Alex Moon in front of a capacity crowd in his hometown of Coventry, Pithie called on former Coventry boxer Steve Earlyto train him for the bout which was live on Sky Sports. This was to be a career highpoint. Pithie came out punching in the 12th round just like the first. Pithie only managed to hold the bout for one defence, a reign which would be co-terminus with the end of his career, losing his final fight to Glaswegian Craig Docherty. Pithie's Final Record was 25 won, 5 lost, 2 draw.

== Personal life ==
Pithie lives in Coventry.
