= László Bognár =

Hungarian boxer

Personal information
- Nickname: "Bogesz"
- Nationality: Hungarian
- Born: László Bognár; 24 February 1968 (age 58) Szolnok, Hungary
- Weight: light welterweight

Boxing career
- Stance: southpaw

Boxing record
- Total fights: 52
- Wins: 37
- Win by KO: 14
- Losses: 13
- Draws: 2
- No contests: 0

László Bognár (born February 24, 1968) is a Hungarian former professional boxer who fought in the featherweight to light welterweight divisions. As an amateur he represented his native country at the 1992 Summer Olympics in Barcelona, Spain.

He is a former WBU International featherweight, WBO Inter-Continental super featherweight, Hungarian and IBC lightweight champion.

== Professional career ==
Bognar turned professional in October 1994 at Szekszárd, Hungary. In his debut he defeated Romanian's Radu Petric on points over six rounds.

== Michael Gomez fights ==
Bognar fought Irish fighter Michael Gomez on his first fight of 2001 on 10 February for the WBO Intercontinental super featherweight title, in Widnes, Cheshire, England. Gomez had Bognar on the canvas in the fifth round after landing a crushing left hook. Although Bognar was shaken Gomez was unable to make his power count. Bognar recovered from his knockdown and kept Gomez at bay with his southpaw jab. In the ninth round Gomez was stopped after referee Dave Paris stepped in following a double left from Bognar, which had Gomez stricken against the ropes. Gomez felt the fight had been stopped prematurely and that he should have been allowed to continue.

Gomez later stated that he was suffering from flu and should not have taken the fight. John Munroe, who was sitting ringside, was called over by Ian Darke, at Gomez's request to verify his theory. This turned into a war of words, with the promoter Frank Warren and John Munroe regarding Brian Hughes, with Frank Warren promising Gomez the rematch, and Gomez stating that he was leaving Brian Hughes' gym to team up with Billy Graham. However, others pointed to his well publicised troubles out of the ring. There had been reports in the press that Gomez was not training regularly, that he had not stuck to his diet and had been out drinking and clubbing. Reports also circulated that Gomez was having trouble in his private life and that he had been stabbed in a street fight.

=== Gomez rematch ===
Gomez wanted to rematch against Bognar, and five months later and a victory over John Munroe, in July 2001, the pair had a rematch in Manchester in what turned out to be a short and explosive encounter. The fight started badly for Gomez when he suffered a flash knockdown in the first round and was down again in the second. Gomez came back to put Bognar down near the end of the second round. Gomez came out firing at the start of the third round and finished the fight with a fourth and final knockdown to avenge his earlier defeat.

== Professional boxing record ==
52 fights	37 wins	13 losses
By knockout	14	11
By decision	23	2
Draws	2	

No.	Result	Record	Opponent	Type	Round, time	Date	Location	Notes
52	Loss	37–13–2	Brunet Zamora	TKO	1 (6)	2 Mar 2007	Nelson Mandela Forum, Florence, Italy	
51	Loss	37–12–2	Leonid Smetanca	PTS	4	26 Nov 2006	City Sporthall, Szekszárd, Hungary	
50	Loss	37–11–2	Emanuele de Prophetis	TKO	4 (12)	20 Oct 2006	Udine, Friuli-Venezia Giulia, Italy	For inaugural IBF International lightweight title
49	Win	37–10–2	Attila Németh	PTS	4	19 Sep 2006	SlimTrax Gym, Budapest, Hungary	
48	Loss	36–10–2	Andrzej Sark	TKO	3 (12)	22 Apr 2006	ASE Sporthall, Paks, Hungary	For vacant IBC super lightweight title
47	Win	36–9–2	Anton Glofak	PTS	6	18 Feb 2006	Sport & Leisure Centre, Tapolca, Hungary	
46	Win	35–9–2	Valeri Kharianau	UD	12	7 May 2005	ASE Sporthall, Paks, Hungary	Retained IBC lightweight title
45	Win	34–9–2	Kirkor Kirkorov	UD	12	13 May 2005	City Sporthall, Szolnok, Hungary	Won vacant IBU lightweight title
44	Win	33–9–2	David Kiilu	MD	12	18 Dec 2004	University Sporthall, Győr, Hungary	Won vacant IBC lightweight title
43	Win	32–9–2	László Komjáthi	SD	10	10 Sep 2004	City Sporthall, Tököl, Hungary	Won Hungarian lightweight title
42	Win	31–9–2	Anton Vontszemu	UD	6	12 Dec 2003	Sport Complex, Tiszaújváros, Hungary	
41	Loss	30–9–2	Matt Zegan	TKO	6 (10)	27 Sep 2003	Gorzów Wielkopolski, Lublin Voivodeship, Poland	For inaugural Republic of Poland International lightweight title
40	Loss	30–8–2	Mzonke Fana	TKO	4 (12)	25 Apr 2003	Graceland Hotel Casino, Secunda, South Africa	For WBC International super featherweight title
39	Win	30–7–2	Viktor Stefan	TD	2 (4)	29 Mar 2003	Unio Gym, Szekszárd, Hungary	
38	Loss	29–7–2	János Nagy	UD	10	22 Nov 2002	City Sporthall, Pápa, Hungary	For vacant Hungarian super featherweight title
37	Win	29–6–2	Patrik Prokopecz	KO	1 (6)	8 Jun 2002	National Sporthall, Budapest, Hungary	
36	Loss	28–6–2	Silvano Usini	TKO	2 (12)	16 Mar 2002	Crema, Lombardy, Italy	For WBA Inter-Continental super featherweight title
35	Win	28–5–2	Florin Oanea	PTS	6	8 Feb 2002	Imperial Gym, Budapest, Hungary	
34	Loss	27–5–2	Alex Arthur	TKO	3 (8), 0:54	17 Nov 2001	Bellahouston Leisure Centre, Glasgow, Scotland	
33	Win	27–4–2	Ionel Mircea	TKO	2 (4)	31 Aug 2001	Košice, Košice Region, Slovakia	
32	Loss	26–4–2	Michael Gomez	TKO	3 (12), 1:00	7 Jul 2001	Velodrome, Manchester, England	Lost WBO Inter-Continental super featherweight title
31	Win	26–3–2	Michael Gomez	TKO	9 (12), 1:00	10 Feb 2001	Kingsway Leisure Centre, Widnes, England	Won WBO Inter-Continental super featherweight title
30	Win	25–3–2	Demir Nanev	TKO	2 (8)	15 Dec 2000	Paks, Tolna County, Hungary	
29	Draw	24–3–2	Santiago Rojas Alcántara	PTS	6	6 Jun 2000	Salón La Paloma, Barcelona, Spain	
28	Loss	24–3–1	Toncho Tonchev	TKO	1 (12), 3:06	15 Jul 1999	Werrington Sports Centre, Peterborough, England	For WBA Inter-Continental super featherweight title
27	Win	24–2–1	Christian Hodorogea	TKO	5 (8)	21 May 1999	Montichiari, Lombardy, Italy	
26	Loss	23–2–1	Frédéric Perez	TKO	8 (10)	13 Mar 1999	Saint-Nazaire, Pays de la Loire, France	
25	Win	23–1–1	Said Lawal	PTS	8	14 Nov 1998	Szekszárd, Tolna County, Hungary	
24	Win	22–1–1	Kwadwo Gyan	KO	6 (6)	30 Aug 1998	Budapest, Hungary	
23	Win	21–1–1	Petre Gigel	TKO	5 (6)	15 May 1998	Szkeszard, Tolna County, Hungary	
22	Win	20–1–1	Ferenc Kovács	TKO	3 (4)	21 Feb 1998	Budapest, Hungary	
21	Win	19–1–1	János Hadjú	PTS	8	17 Jan 1998	Budapest, Hungary	
20	Loss	18–1–1	Cassius Baloyi	TKO	7 (12), 2:16	15 Nov 1997	Carousel Casino, Temba, South Africa	For WBU super bantamweight title
19	Draw	18–0–1	Dramane Nabaloum	PTS	10	17 Aug 1997	Ouagadougou, Kadiogo Province, Burkina Faso	
18	Win	18–0	Hocine Hassani	UD	8	31 May 1997	Kecskemét, Bács-Kiskun County, Hungary	
17	Win	17–0	Robert Zsemberi	TKO	3 (6)	22 Mar 1997	Paks, Tolna County, Hungary	
16	Win	16–0	Jozef Kubovsky	PTS	6	31 Jan 1997	Szekszárd, Tolna County, Hungary	
15	Win	15–0	José Juárez	TKO	2 (12)	9 Nov 1996	Paks, Tolna County, Hungary	Retained WBU International featherweight title
14	Win	14–0	Carlos Rocha	PTS	8	19 Oct 1996	City Sporthall, Paks, Hungary	
13	Win	13–0	Anton Glofak	TKO	5 (8)	24 Sep 1996	Vienna, Vienna Federal State, Austria	
12	Win	12–0	Claudiu Văcariu	TKO	5 (8)	22 Jun 1996	Szekszárd, Tolna County, Hungary	
11	Win	11–0	Gheorghe Ghicean	PTS	8	10 May 1996	Barcs, Somogy County, Hungary	
10	Win	10–0	Paul Kaoma	UD	12	17 Feb 1996	Szekszárd, Tolna County, Hungary	Won vacant WBU International featherweight title
9	Win	9–0	Florin Oanea	PTS	6	1 Dec 1995	Szekszárd, Tolna County, Hungary	
8	Win	8–0	István Horváth	PTS	6	3 Nov 1995	Szekszárd, Tolna County, Hungary	
7	Win	7–0	Marian Diaconu	PTS	6	1 Sep 1995	Szekszárd, Tolna County, Hungary	
6	Win	6–0	Johan Manea	TKO	4 (6)	10 Jun 1995	Nikšić, Central Region, Montenegro	
5	Win	5–0	Claudiu Văcariu	PTS	8	5 May 1995	Subotica, Vojvodina, Serbia	
4	Win	4–0	András Juhász	TKO	4 (6)	26 Apr 1995	Kruševac, Šumadija and Western Serbia, Serbia	
3	Win	3–0	Gheorghe Ghicean	PTS	8	24 Feb 1995	Szekszárd, Tolna County, Hungary	
2	Win	2–0	Thierry Faure	PTS	6	16 Dec 1994	Clermont-Ferrand, Auvergne-Rhône-Alpes, France	
1	Win	1–0	Radu Petrič	PTS	6	10 Oct 1994	Szekszárd, Tolna County, Hungary	
