= Michael Gomez =

British boxer (born 1977)

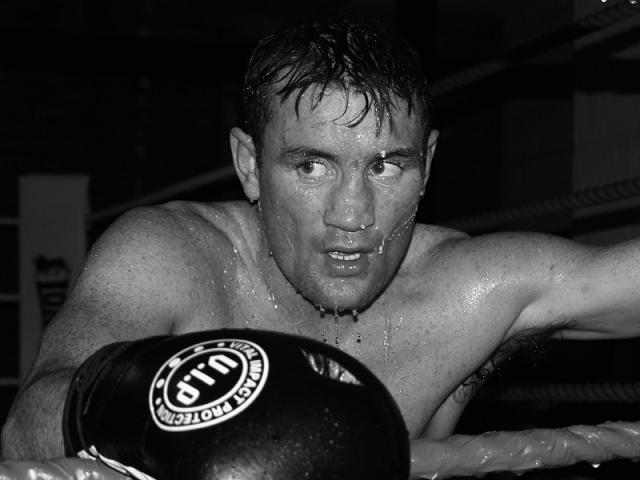

Personal information
- Nicknames: The Predator; The Irish Mexican; The Mancunian Mexican; The Manchester Mexican
- Born: Michael Armstrong; 21 June 1977 (age 49) Longford, Ireland
- Height: 5 ft 5 1/2 in (166 cm)
- Weight: Featherweight; Super-featherweight; Lightweight

Boxing career
- Reach: 68 in (173 cm)
- Stance: Orthodox

Boxing record
- Total fights: 48
- Wins: 38
- Win by KO: 25
- Losses: 10

Michael Gomez (born Michael Armstrong; 21 June 1977) is a former professional boxer who competed from 1995 to 2009. He was born to an Irish Traveller family in Longford, Ireland, spending his early years in Dublin before moving to London and later Manchester, England, with his family at the age of nine. In boxing he was affectionately known as "The Predator", "The Irish Mexican" and "The Mancunian Mexican".

Despite finishing his career fighting in the lightweight division, Gomez is more notable for his fights at featherweight and super-featherweight. During his career he amassed a number of regional championships, most significantly the British super-featherweight title twice, from 1999 to 2004. He also held the WBU super featherweight title from 2004 to 2005.

Gomez, who has been compared to Johnny Tapia, has lived a turbulent life and was often involved in controversial fights. In Gomez's initial matches he suffered a number of losses to journeyman opposition but then went on a run of victories which stretched for almost four years. Of his 17 fights between February 2001 and March 2008, 16 ended in knockouts. Concerns arose about his drinking and failure to adhere to his diet and training regimes after a loss to László Bognár in 2001. Gomez appeared to be "back on track" in 2003, with his high-profile fight against Edinburgh-based fighter Alex Arthur for the British and WBA Inter-Continental super-featherweight titles, which Gomez won by knocking out Arthur in the fifth round.

In 2006, Gomez suffered a controversial loss to Peter McDonagh when, in the middle of a round, he dropped his guard and walked out of the ring, later saying he had retired from boxing. He returned to the ring after a 15-month interval. On 21 June 2008, Gomez lost what was seen as possibly his last bout: a last chance saloon opportunity to resurrect his career against rising star and Olympic silver medallist Amir Khan. Although scoring a surprise knockdown against Khan early on, the fight ended with Gomez being stopped in five rounds.

Gomez took the surname Gomez after his childhood hero Wilfredo Gómez.

== Background ==
Michael Armstrong was born into an Irish traveller family in Longford, Ireland. His mother went into labour with him while driving, so his partially sighted father took over the wheel but crashed the car into a lamp post on the way to the hospital; Michael was delivered in the back seat. The Armstrong family moved to Ballymun, Dublin, and, when Michael was age nine, to Manchester, England.

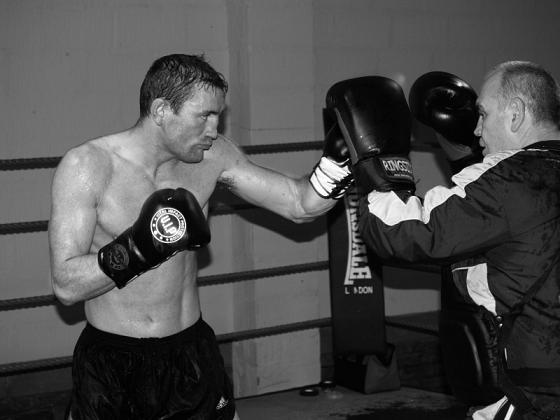
Padwork with Bobby Rimmer

Following the family's move to England, Armstrong's father's eyesight failed further due to retinitis pigmentosa. By that time, there were ten children in the Armstrong family. After his younger sister, Louise, died from sudden infant death syndrome, his mother left the family to live with another woman. Armstrong subsequently spent much of his youth in various children's homes, and was a serial truant from school. His mother had taught him to shoplift as a child, and he was involved in petty crime throughout his youth in Manchester. At nine years old, he began training at Brian Hughes' Collyhurst and Moston Boys' Club. He also played football for a local North Manchester team until the club received so many fines for Armstrong's fighting on the pitch that they were unable to pay them. At this point, he stopped playing football to concentrate on his training in the ring. During his time in the children's home Armstrong met Alison, who has remained his companion (and later his wife) throughout his professional career; they were parents by the time Armstrong was 17.

== Professional career ==
=== Early years ===
Armstrong boxed as an amateur before turning professional in June 1995. He chose the professional surname "Gomez" when the British Boxing Board of Control (BBBoC) required him to select another name at the time of his registration as a professional; there was another boxer in the same weight division using the name "Michael Armstrong". He chose his ring name in honour of Puerto Rican boxer Wilfredo Gómez, whose videotaped fights Armstrong had studied intently as a youth. The name, combined with Gomez's "brawling style", earned him the nickname of "the Irish Mexican". He developed a ring persona based on this nickname, which has remained popular with fans throughout his career. His ring entrance music is that of a Mexican Mariachi band, a reference to his Hispanic-sounding chosen name, and many of his supporters wear sombreros to his fights and wave Irish flags. Gomez also wears long Mexican-style boxing shorts in the colours of the flag of Ireland and often has the shape of a shamrock shaved into the hair on the back of his head.

In his debut fight at the G-Mex Leisure Centre, Manchester, England, Gomez beat previously undefeated Danny Ruegg on the undercard of a bill that included Robin Reid and Michael Brodie. Despite this initial win, Gomez's early career was littered with losses to journeyman fighters such as Greg Upton and Chris Williams.

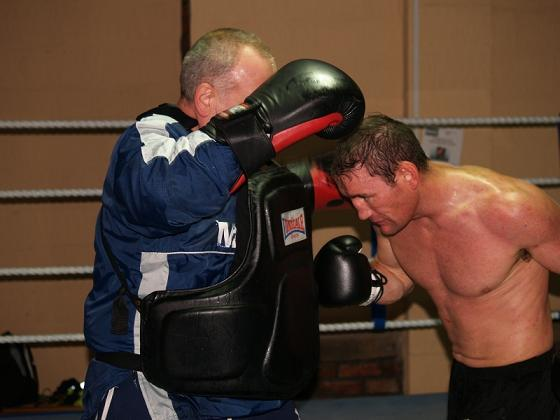
Training on bodywork with Bobby Rimmer

In 1996, Gomez was charged with murder after a gang fight outside a nightclub in Manchester. Gomez had hit one of his attackers, Sam Parle, who died after his head hit the pavement as a result of the blow. The charge was later reduced to manslaughter and Gomez was cleared after it was ruled that he had acted in self-defence.

After this shaky beginning in the professional ranks, Gomez had a run of victories from September 1997 to February 1999. During this period Gomez won seven straight fights before challenging for his first title belt, the vacant British Central Area featherweight title against Chris Jickells on 27 February 1999 in Oldham. Gomez won the title with a fifth-round knockout. He followed his first title win by adding another championship, the IBF Inter-Continental featherweight title, with a second-round knockout over Nigel Leake.

==== Move to super-featherweight ====
Later that year, Gomez relinquished his championship belts in a bid to move up to the super featherweight division. His first fight in the division, in September 1999, was for the vacant British super featherweight title, against the experienced and much heralded Liverpudlian fighter Gary Thornhill. Gomez defeated Thornhill with a second-round knockout. In November 1999, Gomez faced off against Mexican Jose Manjarrez for the WBO Inter-Continental super featherweight title, walking away with the title based on the judges' scores after the full twelve rounds. In 1999, Gomez won four title belts, was undefeated during the year and was also named "Young Boxer of the Year" by the British Boxing Writers' Club. He continued his winning form into 2000 with another run of six wins, and successfully defended his British super featherweight title against Dean Pithie, Carl Greaves and Ian McLeod.

=== Bognar and Lear fights ===
Gomez's first fight in 2001 was on 10 February against Hungarian boxer Laszlo Bognar for the WBO Inter-Continental super featherweight title, in Widnes, Cheshire. Gomez had Bognar on the canvas in the fifth round, but Bognar recovered from this knockdown and used his southpaw jab to keep Gomez from closing in. In the ninth round referee Dave Paris stopped the fight following a double left from Bognar, which had Gomez stricken against the ropes. Gomez felt the fight had been stopped prematurely and that he should have been allowed to continue. Gomez later stated that he was suffering from flu and should not have taken the fight. The Daily Telegraph reported after the match that the pre-fight weigh-in and medical examination were not carried out in accordance with BBBC regulations: the volunteer inspector left before Bognar and Gomez had weighed in, and the medical examiner had not detected that Gomez was ill.

Gomez sought a rematch against Bognar, and five months later in July 2001 the pair met again, this time in Manchester, resulting in a victory for Gomez. The fight started badly for Gomez when he suffered a flash knockdown in the first round and was down again in the second. Gomez came back to knock Bognar down near the end of the second round. Gomez came out firing at the start of the third round and finished the fight with a fourth and final knockdown to avenge his earlier defeat. He followed up his victory over Bognar with a second-round knockout of Scottish fighter Craig Docherty for another British super featherweight title win.

His next opponent was unbeaten West Ham-based fighter Kevin Lear on 1 June 2002, again in Manchester, on the undercard of the Ricky Hatton vs. Eamonn Magee fight. Lear, a former Amateur Boxing Association of England (ABA) champion, kept a one-dimensional Gomez at bay with his sharp jab from the outset of the fight. Gomez took several punches to the face, and his nose began to bleed heavily starting in the sixth round. By the eighth round Gomez was slowing, suffering the effects of Lear's continuing barrage of combinations. At the end of the eighth round Gomez's trainer Brian Hughes retired his fighter, giving Lear a surprise victory.

The defeat to Lear, and the manner in which the fight ended, prompted Hughes, Gomez's longtime mentor and trainer, to ask Gomez to retire from boxing. This event signalled the end of the relationship between Gomez and Hughes; soon after, Gomez crossed Manchester to join Ricky Hatton and former Collyhurst gym stablemate Anthony Farnell at the rival Phoenix Gym run by Billy Graham. Gomez followed the defeat to Lear with a string of three wins, all by knockout.

During the period between the first Bognar fight and the loss to Lear, Gomez's life spun out of control. He was "boozing, brawling and womanising", and was convicted of four drink-drive offenses. During a street fight, Gomez was stabbed and badly injured—his heart stopped beating for 148 seconds while on the operating table.

=== Alex Arthur fight ===
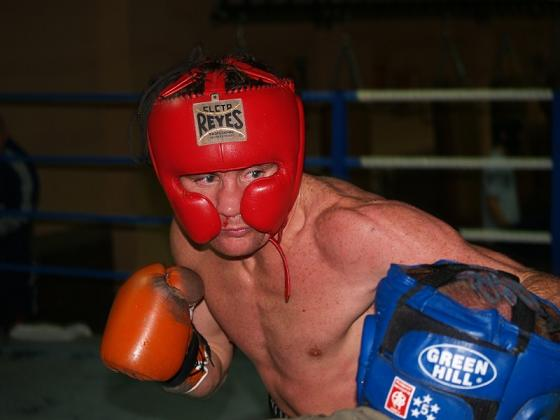
Gomez sparring with headgear

Following his change in trainer, Gomez was contracted for the highest profile fight of his career against Edinburgh-based fighter "Amazing" Alex Arthur for the British and WBA Inter-Continental super featherweight titles. The fight took place in a sold-out Meadowbank Stadium in October 2003, in what was the first professional boxing card in Edinburgh in almost 20 years.

Prior to the fight, Arthur had opined during interviews that "looking deep into Gomez's eyes at the press conference, I'm not sure even he believes he can win. He'll be so fired up I expect it'll take me eight or nine rounds but, if his resistance has gone as people are saying, it could be a lot sooner." With respect to his approach to the fight, Arthur added "I see about 20 ways to beat him. I'm just looking forward to shutting him up."

Arthur, who was looking to retain the BBBofC Lonsdale Belt, was seen as a rising star in British boxing. He was a strong favourite to win the bout against Gomez, who was perceived to have been through too many battles and abused his body too much, and the fight was seen as a stepping stone on Arthur's way to a future world championship. However, Freddie Roach, Arthur's trainer, was criticised when he remained in the United States to coach another boxer instead of continuing to work with Arthur to prepare for his championship match.

Gomez proved his critics wrong when he arrived at the fight in prime condition and with aggression, determination and desire. The first two rounds started at a furious pace, with Arthur keeping Gomez at bay with stiff jabs and Gomez working inside with hooks and body punches. The match was turning into a clash of opposing styles, Arthur displaying control and boxing technique and Gomez storming forward with wild ferocity. From the third round the fight began to turn Gomez's way. Gomez cut Arthur in the third and silenced the home crowd, who were not used to seeing the home-town hero being battered in this manner. Gomez dominated the fourth round and was in full control of the fight—he exposed Arthur's weak defence and at one stage landed 28 punches without reply.

Gomez knocked down his opponent twice before delivering a jarring left hook to Arthur, knocking Arthur to the canvas for the third time. Referee John Coyle stopped the fight, and Gomez won with the resulting TKO in the fifth round. The match was hailed as one of the best fights in Britain for a decade. Boxing promoter Frank Warren called the fight "the greatest contest seen on these shores since Nigel Benn beat Gerald McClellan in 1995". Retired Scottish boxer Ken Buchanan said it was one of the best fights he had ever seen.

Gomez attended Arthur's next fight against Ugandan Michael Kizza in Meadowbank, Scotland, but Arthur did not appear when Gomez fought Ben Odamattey for the WBU super featherweight title in Manchester a few weeks later. Gomez pointed this out when being interviewed shortly afterward, adding "Sky Television want a return. Frank Warren, Arthur's manager, wants a re-match. And most of all so do I." Arthur responded by saying "the fight (with Gomez) is definitely going to happen. Hopefully I'll get another warm-up fight in June and then take on Gomez in September." Despite the rhetoric, the two fighters did not meet each other in the ring again.

=== WBU world title ===
In March 2004, Gomez fought Ghanaian Ben Odamattey for the WBU super featherweight title at the MEN Arena in Manchester, winning the championship by stopping Odamattey in the third round. He retained his WBU title in his next two fights against Justin Juuko and Leva Kirakosyan with knockout wins. Gomez then faced Argentinian boxer "El Vikingo" Javier Osvaldo Alvarez in February 2005, once again fighting at the MEN Arena in Manchester. WBO super middleweight title holder Joe Calzaghe had been scheduled to top the bill but pulled out of his arranged fight, and Gomez and Alvarez were slotted as the main attraction.

The pair clashed at the weigh in, and this antagonism carried into the ring; from the outset of the fight Gomez tried to draw Alvarez into a brawl. Gomez appeared to win the first two rounds behind stinging jabs, but Alvarez seemed unruffled. In the third round, Alvarez started to take control of the fight and landed several blows to Gomez's face. Gomez began quickly in the fourth round, attacking Alvarez from behind his jab and working his way through his opponent's defense. Alvarez appeared content to catch Gomez as he moved forward. Despite Gomez's strong start, Alvarez dazed Gomez with a stiff right hand shot in the fourth round, after which the Argentinian launched into a furious onslaught. Gomez steadied in the fifth but was visibly tired. Two minutes into the sixth round, Alvarez floored Gomez with a right hook. Gomez beat the count and Alvarez then moved in to continue his attack. Referee Mickey Vann stopped the fight after 2 minutes 25 seconds of the round with Gomez pinned to the ropes and taking significant punishment.

=== Peter McDonagh controversy ===
Gomez was out of the ring for almost a year following the Alvarez fight and was next due to fight Willie Limond for the WBU lightweight title, but turned down the opportunity for a chance to fight for an Irish title. Gomez then signed up to fight fellow English-based Irishman, Peter McDonagh, for the Irish lightweight title on the undercard of a Bernard Dunne fight on 28 January 2006 at the National Stadium, Dublin. After the fight was signed Gomez stated "I just can't wait to get my hands on that Irish title because I've been desperate to fight in Ireland for years."

Leading up to the fight McDonagh was making visits to see paranormalist Uri Geller as "mind coach" to help him prepare mentally for the fight, and Geller also travelled with him to Dublin for the fight. Gomez commented that "I'm not sure Uri Geller will be of much use to him though because there won't be any spoons in that ring for him to bend. The only thing I plan on bending is some of McDonagh's ribs with my body punches."

The first four rounds were relatively close, with Gomez leading according to pundits, but the fight ended in the fifth round under bizarre circumstances when for no apparent reason Gomez stopped fighting and failed to defend himself. He then received a number of unanswered punches from McDonagh before being floored. Gomez rose from the canvas immediately but appeared to ignore the referee and walk towards his corner while the referee continued with his count. Gomez then left the ring as the referee was waving the fight off. RTÉ commentator Steve Collins said "I smell a rat, something's not right here."

The Boxing Union of Ireland (BUI) initially suspended both fighters' purses, and investigated reports of unusual betting patterns, with large sums of money being placed on McDonagh to win inside the distance and more specifically in the fifth round. Odds on McDonagh to win the fight in the fifth round had been cut from 125–1 to 18–1 by the afternoon of the bout. Following their investigation, the BUI released the purses to each of the fighters, stating "Michael Gomez and Peter McDonagh confirmed that neither they, their families, nor any person in their camp, as far as they were aware, betted on the fight." The BUI did express disappointment that the bookmaker, Boylesports, who had suspended wagering on the bout due to the unusual betting patterns, had chosen not to reply to the investigators' queries. Gomez later explained the loss by saying that "it was all very simple, I just came to a decision in there that I need to retire from boxing full stop". Gomez further indicated that he planned to pursue a career in bodybuilding. McDonagh, meanwhile, claimed that he had won because of Gellar's assistance leading up to the bout.

Gomez sought a second opportunity to fight McDonagh; in April 2007, he offered to fight for only his training costs. Finally, their rematch for the Irish lightweight title, to be billed as "Redemption", was set for 23 May 2008, but McDonagh pulled out of the scheduled bout.

=== Return to the ring ===
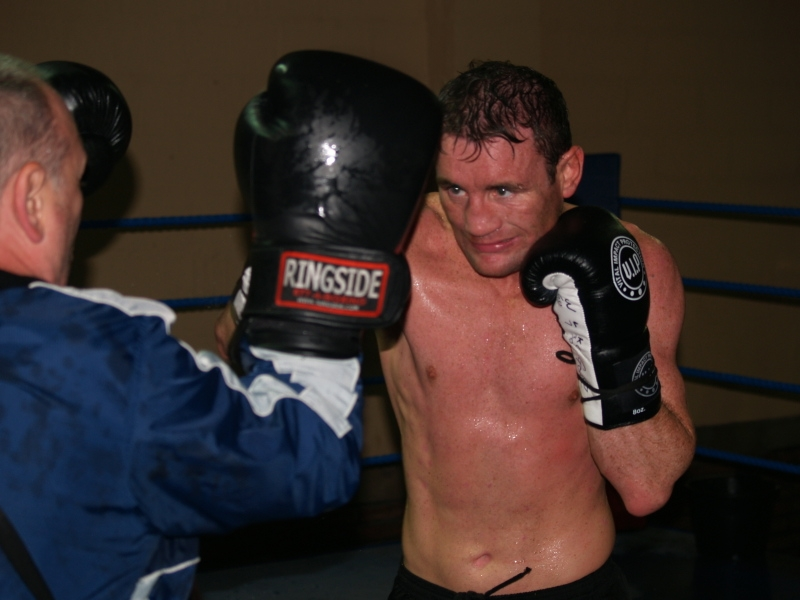
Gomez working the pads

In May 2007, fifteen months after his fight with McDonagh, Gomez returned to the ring to face Daniel Thorpe at the Altrincham Leisure Centre, Manchester.

Gomez had left the Phoenix Gym and was now training at Bobby Rimmers' Boxing Academy in Stalybridge, Manchester, and had returned to fight in the super featherweight division. The fight was billed as "The Last Stand", and the venue was sold out with fellow fighters Ricky Hatton and his brother Matthew Hatton cheering him on from ringside. Gomez won the fight with a stoppage in the third round. The following month Gomez also beat Youssef Al Hamidi, again with a third round stoppage. Following two comeback fights against journeyman opposition Gomez was rumoured to be in line for fights against many of Britain and Ireland's top level super featherweights and lightweights including Kevin Mitchell, Amir Khan, and Carl Johanneson; Gomez himself was seeking a rematch against Peter McDonagh.

He then signed up to face Leeds's Johanneson on 19 October 2007 at the Doncaster Dome, Doncaster, England for the British super featherweight title. Johanneson had just come off his second defeat to Armenian Leva Kirakosyan, whom Gomez had knocked out in October 2004. Before the fight, Gomez was confident, stating "You can't outbox me. I'll jab your head off. If he comes to have a fight with me it is going to be early Christmas for everyone because I don't know who's going to go but someone's going to go and it's not going to be me." At the pre-fight press conference in Doncaster both fighters squared up to each other and promised to knock each other out; during the highly charged face off both fighters had to be kept apart by their promoter and trainers.

As many expected, the highly anticipated domestic clash was a savage brawl from round one. Gomez won the opening rounds and threatened to overpower Johanneson from the opening seconds. The Leeds fighter then gained the upper hand as the fight went on, flooring Gomez in the sixth round only for the "Irish Mexican" to rise from the canvas. Soon after, with Gomez appearing unsteady on his feet, referee Mickey Vann stopped the fight. Gomez said that Vann had stopped the fight early, adding, "When the stoppage came, I wasn't wobbling or staggering, and I only dropped my hands in the fight to show Johanneson that he couldn't hurt me. But the referee simply got the wrong message. It was bad refereeing. I told him straight away I was fine, but he insisted on showing me to my corner." The former champion was clear that he wanted another opportunity to fight for the British title.

=== Amir Khan fight ===
Gomez fought Amir Khan for the Commonwealth lightweight title at the National Indoor Arena, Birmingham, on 21 June 2008, Gomez's thirty-first birthday. Khan said that "there is no way he will be as fit as me, so I expect a spectacular stoppage". Gomez did not attend the scheduled pre-fight press conference, prompting Khan to deride him, and promoter Frank Warren accused Gomez of failing to show respect to Khan and the media.

During the fight Khan knocked Gomez to the canvas in the first round with a barrage of hooks and uppercuts. In the second round, Gomez caught Khan with a left hook, knocking down the younger fighter and exposing his defensive weakness; however, Khan steadied himself after the mandatory eight-count, and cut Gomez above the left eye before the round ended. Gomez caught Khan in the ribs with a left hook in the fourth round which left Khan unstable for a moment, but Khan responded with a flurry of hooks and jabs. Khan landed a "cracking left hook" in the fifth, but Gomez beat the count. At 2:32 of the fifth round, referee John Keane stopped the fight when Gomez was knocked into the ropes by a Khan left uppercut. After the fight, Khan said he felt he had moved up a level by "fighting world class fighters like Gomez."

Before the fight, sports writers considered Gomez a tough opponent for Khan, with his "knockout punch" and his success against Alex Arthur in similar circumstances, despite having lost three of his last six fights. Gomez saw the fight as an opportunity to reignite his career; in an interview shortly before the fight he spoke of how "[t]his fight really is my last chance to set myself up for life and become known in every household in Britain". At the same time, he reflected on the positive effects of his career in the ring, saying "Boxing kept my feet on the ground and gave me a focus. It's got me through the bad times and calmed me down. If it wasn't for boxing, I wouldn't have my beautiful wife and family". Gomez lives with his wife Alison and their three children in Manchester.

== Professional boxing record ==
48 fights	38 wins	10 losses
By knockout	25	7
By decision	13	3

No.	Result	Record	Opponent	Type	Round, time	Date	Location	Notes
48	Loss	38–10	Ricky Burns	TKO	7 (12), 0:47	27 Mar 2009	Bellahouston Leisure Centre, Glasgow, Scotland	For Commonwealth super-featherweight title
47	Win	38–9	Chris Long	PTS	6	21 Dec 2008	Dalziel Park Hotel and Conference Centre, Motherwell, Scotland	
46	Win	37–9	Baz Carey	PTS	6	10 Oct 2008	Dalziel Park Hotel and Conference Centre, Motherwell, Scotland	
45	Win	36–9	Chris Brophy	TKO	2 (4)	29 Sep 2008	Municipal Hall, Colne, England	
44	Loss	35–9	Amir Khan	TKO	5 (12), 2:33	21 Jun 2008	National Indoor Arena, Birmingham, England	For Commonwealth lightweight title
43	Win	35–8	Baz Carey	PTS	6	29 Mar 2008	Exhibition and Conference Centre, Glasgow, Scotland	
42	Loss	34–8	Carl Johanneson	TKO	6 (12), 2:50	19 Oct 2007	The Dome Leisure Centre, Doncaster, England	For British super-featherweight title
41	Win	34–7	Youssef al-Hamidi	TKO	3 (6), 1:24	24 Jun 2007	Robin Park Arena, Wigan, England	
40	Win	33–7	Daniel Thorpe	TKO	3 (6), 2:25	6 May 2007	Leisure Centre, Altrincham, England	
39	Loss	32–7	Peter McDonagh	TKO	6 (12), 2:04	28 Jan 2006	National Stadium, Dublin, Ireland	For vacant Irish lightweight title
38	Loss	32–6	Javier Osvaldo Alvarez	TKO	6 (12), 2:25	11 Feb 2005	MEN Arena, Manchester, England	Lost WBU super-featherweight title
37	Win	32–5	Levan Kirakosyan	TKO	6 (12)	1 Oct 2004	MEN Arena, Manchester, England	Retained WBU super-featherweight title
36	Win	31–5	Justin Juuko	TKO	2 (12), 2:05	22 May 2004	Kingsway Leisure Centre, Widnes, England	Retained WBU super-featherweight title
35	Win	30–5	Ben Odamattey	TKO	5 (12), 1:30	3 Apr 2004	MEN Arena, Manchester, England	Won vacant WBU super-featherweight title
34	Win	29–5	Alex Arthur	TKO	5 (12), 2:58	25 Oct 2003	Meadowbank Stadium, Edinburgh, Scotland	Won WBA Inter-Continental and British super-featherweight titles
33	Win	28–5	Wladimir Borov	TKO	3 (8), 1:57	5 Apr 2003	MEN Arena, Manchester, England	
32	Win	27–5	Rakhim Mingaleyev	RTD	4 (8), 3:00	18 Jan 2003	Guild Hall, Preston, England	
31	Win	26–5	Jimmy Beech	TKO	4 (8)	28 Sep 2002	MEN Arena, Manchester, England	
30	Loss	25–5	Kevin Lear	RTD	8 (12), 3:00	1 Jun 2002	MEN Arena, Manchester, England	For vacant WBU super-featherweight title
29	Win	25–4	Craig Docherty	TKO	2 (12), 1:46	27 Oct 2001	MEN Arena, Manchester, England	Retained British super-featherweight title
28	Win	24–4	László Bognár	TKO	3 (12), 1:00	7 Jul 2001	Manchester Velodrome, Manchester, England	Won WBO Inter-Continental super-featherweight title
27	Loss	23–4	László Bognár	TKO	9 (12), 1:00	10 Feb 2001	Kingsway Leisure Centre, Widnes, England	Lost WBO Inter-Continental super-featherweight title
26	Win	23–3	Ian McLeod	PTS	12	11 Dec 2000	Kingsway Leisure Centre, Widnes, England	Retained British super-featherweight title
25	Win	22–3	Awel Abdulai	UD	8	19 Oct 2000	Zembo Shrine Building, Harrisburg, Pennsylvania, US	
24	Win	21–3	Carl Greaves	KO	2 (12)	8 Jul 2000	Kingsway Leisure Centre, Widnes, England	Retained British super-featherweight title
23	Win	20–3	Carl Allen	KO	2 (8)	24 Jun 2000	Hampden Park, Glasgow, Scotland	
22	Win	19–3	Dean Pithie	PTS	12	29 Feb 2000	Kingsway Leisure Centre, Widnes, England	Retained British super-featherweight title
21	Win	18–3	Chris Jickells	TKO	4 (8)	29 Jan 2000	MEN Arena, Manchester, England	
20	Win	17–3	Oscar Galindo	TKO	11 (12), 2:53	11 Dec 1999	Everton Park Sports Centre, Liverpool, England	Retained WBO Inter-Continental super-featherweight title
19	Win	16–3	Jose Manjarrez	UD	12	6 Nov 1999	Kingsway Leisure Centre, Widnes, England	Won vacant WBO Inter-Continental super-featherweight title
18	Win	15–3	Gary Thornhill	TKO	2 (12), 1:43	4 Sep 1999	York Hall, London, England	Won vacant British super-featherweight title
17	Win	14–3	William Alverzo	PTS	6	7 Aug 1999	Etess Arena, Atlantic City, New Jersey, US	
16	Win	13–3	Nigel Leake	TKO	2 (12), 1:24	29 May 1999	North Bridge Leisure Centre, Halifax, England	Won vacant IBF Inter-Continental featherweight title
15	Win	12–3	Chris Jickells	TKO	5 (10), 2:26	27 Feb 1999	Sports Centre, Oldham, England	Won vacant British Central Area featherweight title
14	Win	11–3	Dave Hinds	PTS	6	13 Feb 1999	Telewest Arena, Newcastle, England	
13	Win	10–3	Kevin Sheil	TKO	4 (6), 2:43	19 Dec 1998	Everton Park Sports Centre, Liverpool, England	
12	Win	9–3	David Jeffrey	TKO	1 (6), 1:04	14 Nov 1998	Grundy Park Leisure Centre, Cheshunt, England	
11	Win	8–3	Peter Buckley	PTS	6	5 Sep 1998	Ice Rink, Telford, England	
10	Win	7–3	Craig Spacie	TKO	3 (4), 2:27	16 May 1998	York Hall, London, England	
9	Win	6–3	Benny Jones	PTS	4	18 Apr 1998	NYNEX Arena, Manchester, England	
8	Win	5–3	Wayne Jones	TKO	2 (4), 2:34	11 Sep 1997	Kingsway Leisure Centre, Widnes, England	
7	Loss	4–3	Chris Williams	PTS	4	3 May 1997	NYNEX Arena, Manchester, England	
6	Win	4–2	John Farrell	TKO	2 (4), 1:35	22 Mar 1997	Wythenshawe Forum, Manchester, England	
5	Win	3–2	David Morris	PTS	4	9 Nov 1996	NYNEX Arena, Manchester, England	
4	Win	2–2	Martin Evans	TKO	1 (4)	19 Sep 1996	Bowlers Exhibition Centre, Manchester, England	
3	Loss	1–2	Danny Ruegg	PTS	4	24 Nov 1995	Bowlers Exhibition Centre, Manchester, England	
2	Loss	1–1	Greg Upton	PTS	4	15 Sep 1995	Leisure Centre, Mansfield, England	
1	Win	1–0	Danny Ruegg	PTS	6	10 Jun 1995	G-Mex Centre, Manchester, England	

Sporting positions
Regional boxing titles
Vacant Title last held by Stefy Bull	British Central Area featherweight champion 27 February 1999 – May 1999; Vacated	Vacant Title next held by Jamie McKeever
Vacant Title last held by Paul Ingle	IBF Inter-Continental featherweight champion 29 May 1999 – November 1999; Vacated	Vacant Title next held by David Toledo
Vacant Title last held by Charles Shepherd	British super-featherweight champion 4 September 1999 – October 2002; Vacated	Vacant Title next held by Alex Arthur
Vacant Title last held by Gary Thornhill	WBO Inter-Continental super-featherweight champion 6 November 1999 – 10 February 2001	Succeeded by László Bognár
Preceded by László Bognár	WBO Inter-Continental super-featherweight champion 7 July 2001 – June 2002; Vacated	Vacant Title next held by Alex Arthur
Preceded by Alex Arthur	British super-featherweight champion 25 October 2003 – April 2004; Vacated	Vacant Title next held by Alex Arthur
Preceded by Alex Arthur	WBA Inter-Continental super-featherweight champion 25 October 2003 – February 2004; Vacated	Vacant Title next held by Janos Nagy
Minor world boxing titles
Vacant Title last held by Kevin Lear	WBU super-featherweight champion 3 April 2004 – 11 February 2005	Succeeded by Javier Osvaldo Alvarez
