= Scott Harrison (boxer) =

Scottish boxer (born 1977)

Personal information
- Nickname: The Real McCoy
- Nationality: Scottish
- Born: 19 August 1977 (age 49) Bellshill, Lanarkshire, Greater Glasgow, Scotland
- Height: 5 ft 7 in (170 cm)
- Weight: Featherweight; Lightweight

Boxing career
- Reach: 69 in (175 cm)
- Stance: Orthodox

Boxing record
- Total fights: 32
- Wins: 27
- Win by KO: 15
- Losses: 3
- Draws: 2
Medal record
Men's amateur boxing
Representing Scotland
European Championships
Bronze medal – third place	1996 Vejle	Featherweight

Scott Harrison (born 19 August 1977) is a Scottish professional boxer who held the WBO featherweight title twice between 2002 and 2005. At regional level, he held the Commonwealth featherweight title from 2000 to 2002 and the British featherweight title in 2001. As an amateur, he won a bronze medal in the featherweight division at the 1996 European Championships.

Harrison has a record of 8-1-1 (5 by KO) in world title fights. He also has a record of 6-1-0 (2 by KO) against former world champions.

His career has been dogged by controversy: out of the ring and problems with alcohol have caused him to fall foul of the law on numerous occasions.

== Amateur career ==
In March 1995 Harrison won the Scottish ABA Championship in Coatbridge, Scotland. He defeated Alston Buchanan 24–9 in the final to claim the title.

Harrison won gold at the 1995 European Junior Championships in Siofok, Hungary. He defeated Thomas Papp, Attila Jonas and Yohan Zaoui before beating Russian Ivan Goriunov 11–5 in the final to claim the gold medal.

At the 1996 European Championships in Vejle, Denmark, he won bronze by beating Toni Naskovski in the first round, János Nagy, and Evgeniy Shestakov to reach the semi-final against Russian southpaw favorite and eventual gold medal winner Ramaz Paliani, to whom he lost 1–7.

=== European Junior Championships results ===
1995

- Defeated Thomas Papp (Germany) 19-7
- Defeated Attila Jonas (Hungary) AB 3
- Defeated Yohan Zaoui (France) +9:9
- Defeated Ivan Goriunov (Russia) 11-5

=== European Championships results ===
1996

- Defeated Toni Naskovski (Macedonia) RSC 3
- Defeated János Nagy (Hungary) 13-2
- Defeated Evgeniy Shestakov (Ukraine) 6-4
- Lost to Ramaz Paliani (Russia) 1-7

== Professional career ==
=== Early career ===
Harrison won his first professional bout on 7 October 1996, when he knocked out Eddie Sica in round 2 at Lewisham Theatre in London. In January 2000, in his eleventh fight, Harrison picked up the Commonwealth featherweight title by beating Patrick Mullings by unanimous decision. He became the first Scottish boxer to win the Commonwealth featherweight title since Evan Armstrong in 1974.

After capturing the Commonwealth title Harrison faced two former world champions. In April 2000 Harrison made his US debut. He faced former two-weight champion Tracy Harris Patterson at Madison Square Garden on the undercard of Lennox Lewis vs. Michael Grant. Harrison dominated the fight, winning by unanimous decision, with the judges scoring the contest 97–93, 98-92 and 99–91. Three months later Harrison defeated former IBF featherweight champion Tom Johnson at London Arena. He dominated the fight, retaining his IBO Inter-Continental Featherweight Title on his way to a unanimous decision, 117–113, 119–111, 119–109, on the judges' cards. Harrison rounded the year off with the first defence of his Commonwealth title. He stopped Eric Odumase by TKO in round 12 of the contest at Waterfront Hall in Belfast.

In March 2001, Harrison added the vacant British title to his Commonwealth Featherweight title with a win against Liverpool's Richie Wenton at Ponds Forge in Sheffield. Harrison put Wenton down in the first round but it wasn't until the fourth round referee Dave Parris stopped the fight after continued pressure from Harrison. After the fight Harrison said "It was my sweetest win". Harrison made the first defence of his British title six months later against former title holder Gary Thornhill at the M.E.N. Arena in Manchester. Harrison dropped his opponent with a left hook to the body and the contest was halted after 31 seconds of round five.

Harrison made the final defence of his British title in November 2001 against former WBO featherweight champion Steve Robinson. Harrison was in control for the duration of the fight with referee Richie Davies stopping the fight only nine seconds of the round three remaining. At the end of 2001, Harrison was voted Young Boxer of the Year by the Professional Boxing Association and the Boxing Writers' Club.

=== World Champion ===
Harrison became WBO featherweight champion in 2002, defeating former Olympic bronze medalist Julio Pablo Chacon with a unanimous points decision at Braehead Arena in Glasgow by scores of 117–111, 117-112 and 117–111. With Harrison's win, he became Scotland's eight world champion. After picking up the world title for the first time Harrison ended the year, The Ring's #8-ranked featherweight in the world.

Harrison made his first world title defense against Wayne McCullough in March 2003 at Braehead Arena. Harrison comprehensively outpointed McCullough winning on the judges' scorecards 119–109, 119-108 and 120–108. After the fight McCullough said Harrison was the strongest boxer he had faced.

In July 2003, he lost the title to the Mexican Manuel Medina but regained it in November of that year. In May 2006 Harrison pulled out of a title defence in Belfast. Promoter Frank Warren was disappointed with the decision but urged Harrison to seek help for his problems. It was reported that an incident had occurred in a nightclub, for which he was due to go to trial. Over the coming days Harrison checked into the Priory Clinic, citing problems with depression and alcohol. Harrison vacated the title after withdrawing from a bout against Nicky Cook in December 2006 because he could no longer make the featherweight limit.

In February 2008 Harrison claimed to be fully fit, and announced his intention to apply for his boxing licence to be reinstated, with a view to eventually taking on Alex Arthur for the WBO title. He blamed the pressures of making the weight limit for the featherweight division for contributing to his stress and depression, and claimed he would in future fight at super featherweight.

=== Comeback ===
In October 2011 Harrison failed in his attempt to regain his boxing licence from the British Boxing Board of Control after being told he had not supplied all the relevant paperwork. However, in December of that year he was granted his licence back after his case was backed by the Scottish Boxing Area Council and chairman Bernard Connolly. Harrison was scheduled to make his return to the ring in March 2012 with a fight in Blackpool. The bout was placed in doubt due to a legal dispute involving rival promoters Frank Warren and Harrison's manager Frank Maloney. The bout was later called off after Harrison was arrested for alleged shoplifting from a Glasgow supermarket. This led to manager Frank Maloney dropping Harrison from his stable. Harrison later signed a three-year management and co-promotion deal with Alex Morrison.

Harrison was scheduled to return to the ring on 29 June 2012 against Frenchman Brahim Bariz, who withdrew in the 11th hour. Instead he faced Hungarian teenager György Mizsei Jr. on the same date. Harrison won the fight, which took place at Kelvin Hall as an Alex Morrison promotion, after the referee stopped the fight in the fourth round. With the win Harrison picked up the International Masters lightweight title. In his second fight since returning to the ring, Harrison went on to beat Joe Elfidh, despite dropping Elfidh in the first round Harrison had to settle for a points win over six rounds. In April 2013 Harrison challenged Liam Walsh for the WBO European lightweight title. Harrison lost the bout in a unanimous decision, scoring 98-92 and 97–93, 97-93 from the three judges.

=== British & Irish Boxing Authority ===
In September 2018 it was announced Harrison had been granted a licence from the British & Irish Boxing Authority (BIBA) with the intention to return to the ring before the end of 2018. Harrison later signed a promotional deal with Lee McAllister's Assassin Boxing Promotions & Management. A fight was scheduled to take place on 8 December 2018, at the Glasgow Club Bellahouston in Glasgow against Ghana's Tackie Annan but the bout was postponed after Annan suffered an injury. Harrison was then scheduled to appear on the undercard of Nigel Benn's proposed comeback fight against Sakio Bika in November 2019, but Harrison pulled out of the fight citing "unprofessional" behaviour from Benn's team. Harrison was then scheduled to face Berman Sanchez in Birmingham but the fight fell through.

On 17 May 2020, Harrison confirmed he would return to professional boxing after a seven-year absence with a fight against Orkney based PBC International Champion Paul Peers. The closed-door contest took place in Aberdeen on 18 July 2020 and was broadcast live on FITE TV. Harrison won the bout with a third-round stoppage. Harrison floored his rival with a body shot prompting Peers' corner to throw in the towel.

== Outside the ring ==
Harrison was jailed for eight months on 2 September 2008 for drink-driving and assault, and was released from HM Prison Barlinnie on 31 December 2008 after serving four months of his sentence.

On 25 April 2009 Harrison was sentenced to 30 months imprisonment for assault in Málaga. He served five months on remand in Alhaurín de la Torre and was released on 13 September 2011.

On 3 May 2013 Harrison lost his appeal against suspending the initial four-year sentence and was told that he had 15 days to report to prison otherwise he would be arrested and detained immediately. After serving the majority of his four-year sentence at the maximum security prison HMP Shotts, he was transferred to HMP Barlinnie and released in July 2018.

== Professional boxing record ==
32 fights	27 wins	3 losses
By knockout	15	1
By decision	12	2
Draws	2	

No.	Result	Record	Opponent	Type	Round, time	Date	Location	Notes
32	Loss	27–3–2	Liam Walsh	UD	10	20 Apr 2013	Wembley Arena, London, England	For WBO European lightweight title
31	Win	27–2–2	Joe Elfidh	UD	6	22 Sep 2012	Exhibition and Conference Centre, Glasgow, Scotland	
30	Win	26–2–2	Gyorgy Mizsei	TKO	4 (10), 1:30	29 Jun 2012	Kelvin Hall, Glasgow, Scotland	
29	Win	25–2–2	Nedal Hussein	UD	12	5 Nov 2005	Braehead Arena, Glasgow, Scotland	Retained WBO featherweight title
28	Win	24–2–2	Michael Brodie	KO	4 (10), 0:46	3 Jun 2005	M.E.N Arena, Manchester, England	Retained WBO featherweight title
27	Draw	23–2–2	Victor Polo	SD	12	28 Jan 2005	Braehead Arena, Glasgow, Scotland	Retained WBO featherweight title
26	Win	23–2–1	Samuel Kebede	TKO	1 (12), 0:59	29 Oct 2004	Braehead Arena, Glasgow, Scotland	Retained WBO featherweight title
25	Win	22–2–1	William Abelyan	TKO	3 (12), 1:45	19 Jun 2004	Braehead Arena, Glasgow, Scotland	Retained WBO featherweight title
24	Win	21–2–1	Walter Estrada	TKO	5 (12), 1:03	6 Mar 2004	Braehead Arena, Glasgow, Scotland	Retained WBO featherweight title
23	Win	20–2–1	Manuel Medina	TKO	11 (12), 0:31	29 Nov 2003	Braehead Arena, Glasgow, Scotland	Won WBO featherweight title
22	Loss	19–2–1	Manuel Medina	SD	12	12 Jul 2003	Braehead Arena, Glasgow, Scotland	Lost WBO featherweight title
21	Win	19–1–1	Wayne McCullough	UD	12	22 Mar 2003	Braehead Arena, Glasgow, Scotland	Retained WBO featherweight title
20	Win	18–1–1	Pablo Chacón	UD	12	19 Oct 2002	Braehead Arena, Glasgow, Scotland	Won WBO featherweight title
19	Win	17–1–1	Victor Santiago	TKO	6 (12), 2:22	8 Jun 2002	Braehead Arena, Glasgow, Scotland	Won interim WBO featherweight title
18	Win	16–1–1	Tony Wehbee	TKO	3 (12), 1:49	11 Mar 2002	Kelvin Hall, Glasgow, Scotland	Retained Commonwealth Featherweight title
17	Win	15–1–1	Steve Robinson	TKO	3 (12), 2:51	17 Nov 2001	Bellahouston Leisure Centre, Glasgow, Scotland	Retained Commonwealth Featherweight and British Featherweight titles
16	Win	14–1–1	Gary Thornhill	TKO	5 (12), 0:31	15 Sep 2001	M.E.N Arena, Manchester, England	Retained Commonwealth Featherweight and British Featherweight titles
15	Win	13–1–1	Richie Wenton	TKO	4 (12), 2:57	24 Mar 2001	Ponds Forge Arena, Sheffield, England	Retained Commonwealth Featherweight and Won vacant British Featherweight titles
14	Win	12–1–1	Eric Odumase	TKO	12 (12), 0:31	11 Nov 2000	Waterfront Hall, Belfast, Northern Ireland	Retained Commonwealth Featherweight title
13	Win	11–1–1	Tom Johnson	UD	12	15 Jul 2000	London Arena, Millwall, England	Retained IBO Inter-Continental Featherweight title
12	Win	10–1–1	Tracy Harris Patterson	UD	10	29 Apr 2000	Madison Square Garden, New York, US	
11	Win	9–1–1	Patrick Mullings	UD	12	24 Jan 2000	St.Andrew's Sporting Club, Glasgow, Scotland	Won Commonwealth Featherweight title
10	Win	8–1–1	Smith Odoom	UD	12	10 Oct 1999	Elephant & Castle Centre, Southwark, England	Won IBO Inter-Continental Featherweight title
9	Win	7–1–1	John Matthews	RTD	4 (8), 3:00	6 Mar 1999	Elephant & Castle Centre, Southwark, England	
8	Win	6–1–1	Rakhim Mingaleyev	PTS	8	17 Oct 1998	Bowlers Exhibition Centre, Manchester, England	
7	Win	5–1–1	Carl Allen	TKO	6	9 Jun 1998	Ice Arena, Hull, England	
6	Win	4–1–1	Peter Buckley	PTS	4	31 Jan 1998	Lee Valley Leisure Centre, Picketts Lock, England	
5	Draw	3–1–1	Stephane Fernandez	PTS	6	16 Dec 1997	Grande-Synthe, France	
4	Loss	3–1	Miguel Matthews	TKO	4 (6), 0:58	4 Oct 1997	Alexandra Palace, Muswell Hill, England	
3	Win	3–0	David Morris	PTS	4	25 Mar 1997	Lewisham Theatre, Lewisham, England	
2	Win	2–0	Peter Buckley	PTS	4	11 Jan 1997	York Hall, Bethnal Green, England	
1	Win	1–0	Eddie Sica	TKO	2 (4)	7 Oct 1996	Lewisham Theatre, Lewisham, England	

== See also ==
- List of world featherweight boxing champions
- List of British world boxing champions

Sporting positions
Regional boxing titles
Preceded by Patrick Mullings	Commonwealth featherweight champion 24 January 2000 – 2002; Vacated	Vacant Title next held by Nicky Cook
Vacant Title last held by Gary Thornhill	British featherweight champion 24 March 2001 – 2002; Vacated	Vacant Title next held by Jamie McKeever
World boxing titles
New title	WBO featherweight champion Interim title 8 June 2002 – 19 October 2002; Won full title	Vacant Title next held by Juan Manuel Márquez
Preceded by Pablo Chacón	WBO featherweight champion 19 October 2002 – 12 July 2003	Succeeded by Manuel Medina
Preceded by Manuel Medina	WBO featherweight champion 29 November 2003 – 6 December 2006; Vacated	Succeeded by Juan Manuel Márquez; Interim champion promoted
