= Justin Juuko =

Ugandan boxer

Personal information
- Nickname: The Destroyer
- Nationality: Ugandan
- Born: Justin Juuko; 26 December 1972 (age 53) Masaka, Uganda
- Height: 5 ft 7 1/2 in (1.71 m)
- Weight: Featherweight; Super featherweight Lightweight; Light welterweight Welterweight

Boxing career
- Reach: 72 in (183 cm)
- Stance: Orthodox

Boxing record
- Total fights: 58
- Wins: 45
- Win by KO: 30
- Losses: 12
- Draws: 1
- No contests: 0

Justin "The Destroyer" Juuko (born 26 December 1972 in Masaka) is a Ugandan amateur light flyweight and professional boxer who was active between the 1990s and the 2010s. In 1990, he won a gold medal at the Commonwealth Games in Auckland, New Zealand.

As a professional, he has won the World Boxing Council (WBC) International super featherweight title, the WBC FECARBOX super featherweight title, the African Boxing Union (ABU) light welterweight title, the North American Boxing Federation (NABF) super featherweight title, and the Commonwealth super featherweight title. He was a challenger for the interim WBA super featherweight title against Antonio Hernandez, the WBC super featherweight title against Floyd Mayweather Jr., the International Boxing Association (IBA) super featherweight title against Diego Corrales, the World Boxing Union (WBU) super featherweight title against Michael Gomez, the International Boxing Association (IBA) lightweight title against Rustam Nugaev, and the Global Boxing Union (GBU) light welterweight title against Gábor Vető.

His professional fighting weight varied from 125 pounds (57 kg) (featherweight) to 143 pounds (65 kg) (welterweight).

Justin Juuko, son hauteur est de 171 cm et portée est de 183 cm, il a des records en tant que boxeur amateur et boxeur professionnel.

== Life after boxing ==
He is a member of the political party Forum for Democratic Change (FDC). On December 12, 2020, he was arrested with other people the announcement made by his party FDC which accused the force of order (Police ) for kidnapping him. They were missing for 11 days.

Le 01 janvier 2021 Justin Juuko et son collègue M. Garrypaul sont les partisans du FDC parti politique de l'opposition dans la région du Grand Masaka, ils ont été libérés après avoir passés 19 jours au détention, ils étaient arrêtés le 12 décembre par la chefferie du renseignement militaire (CMI)

== Professional boxing record ==
58 fights	45 wins	12 losses
By knockout	30	11
By decision	15	1
Draws	1	

No.	Result	Record	Opponent	Type	Round, time	Date	Location	Notes
58	Loss	45–12–1	Zahir Raheem	TKO	4 (10), 0:27	1 Jun 2013	Emerald Queen Casino, Tacoma, Washington, U.S.	
57	Loss	45–11–1	Gábor Vető	KO	2 (12), 2:14	21 Apr 2012	Hotel Marsoel, Chur, Switzerland	For GBU super lightweight title
56	Win	45–10–1	Ibrahim Amadeus	TKO	4 (10)	1 Jan 2010	Masaka, Central Region, Uganda	
55	Win	44–10–1	Peter Olouch	UD	8	17 May 2009	Little Flowers Arena, Kampala, Uganda	
54	Loss	43–10–1	Rustam Nugaev	KO	2 (12), 2:50	15 Nov 2008	Ice Palace, Naberezhnye Chelny, Russia	For IBA lightweight title
53	Win	43–9–1	Abdalla Mngola	SD	10	30 May 2008	Nakivubo Stadium, Kampala, Uganda	
52	Win	42–9–1	Deo Njiku	RTD	6 (10), 0:10	31 Dec 2007	Tropica Inn Hotel, Masaka, Uganda	
51	Win	41–9–1	Chaurembo Palasa	UD	10	8 Jul 2007	Fairway Hotel, Kampala, Uganda	
50	Win	40–9–1	Joseph Miyumo	UD	10	28 Apr 2007	Fairway Hotel, Kampala, Uganda	
49	Loss	39–9–1	José Santa Cruz	TKO	3 (10), 2:14	22 Apr 2005	Cicero Stadium, Cicero, Illinois, U.S.	
48	Loss	39–8–1	Michael Gomez	TKO	2 (12), 2:05	22 May 2004	Kingsway Leisure Centre, Widnes, England	For WBU super featherweight title
47	Win	39–7–1	Geoffrey Munika	UD	10	6 Jun 2003	Nakivubo Stadium, Kampala, Uganda	
46	Win	38–7–1	Venance Mponji	TKO	2 (10)	1 Jan 2003	Recreation Grounds, Kamapala, Uganda	
45	Win	37–7–1	Godfrey Mawe	TKO	10 (10)	30 Nov 2002	Lugogo Stadium, Kampala, Uganda	
44	Loss	36–7–1	Miguel Cotto	TKO	5 (10), 2:44	22 Jun 2002	MGM Grand Garden Arena, Paradise, Nevada, U.S.	
43	Loss	36–6–1	Carlos Hernández	UD	10	25 Nov 2001	Stateline Casino, West Wendover, Nevada, U.S.	
42	Win	36–5–1	Charles Owiso	PTS	8	28 Jul 2001	Nakivubo Stadium, Kampala, Uganda	
41	Loss	35–5–1	Ernesto Zepeda	TKO	5 (12), 0:48	22 Apr 2001	Fantasy Springs Casino, Indio, California, U.S.	Lost WBC-NABF super featherweight title
40	Win	35–4–1	Antonio Ramírez	TKO	9 (12), 2:45	21 Jan 2001	Sunset Station, San Antonio, Texas, U.S.	Won vacant WBC-NABF super featherweight title
39	Loss	34–4–1	Diego Corrales	KO	10 (12), 2:35	17 Jun 2000	Staples Center, Los Angeles, California, U.S.	For IBA super featherweight title
38	Win	34–3–1	David Ouma	TD	6 (12)	31 Dec 1999	Nakivubo Stadium, Kampala, Uganda	Won vacant African super lightweight title
37	Loss	33–3–1	Floyd Mayweather Jr.	KO	9 (12), 1:20	22 May 1999	Mandalay Bay, Paradise, Nevada, U.S.	For WBC super featherweight title
36	Loss	33–2–1	Antonio Hernández	TKO	11 (12), 2:18	20 Feb 1999	John Justin Arena, Fort Worth, Texas, U.S.	For vacant WBA interim super featherweight title
35	Win	33–1–1	John Bronson	PTS	12	3 Oct 1998	Gimnasio José Beracasa, Caracas, Venezuela	Won vacant WBC FECARBOX super featherweight title
34	Win	32–1–1	Mark Ramsey	PTS	8	28 Mar 1998	Ice Arena, Kingston upon Hull, England	
33	Win	31–1–1	Didier Schaeffer	TKO	5 (12), 1:05	31 Jan 1998	Lee Valley Leisure Centre, London, England	
32	Win	30–1–1	Volodymyr Matkivskyy	PTS	12	9 Oct 1997	Nakivubo Stadium, Kampala, Uganda	Retained WBC International super featherweight title
31	Win	29–1–1	Jorge Luis López	TKO	9 (10), 1:33	12 Jul 1997	Caesars Tahoe, Stateline, Nevada, U.S.	
30	Win	28–1–1	David Ouma	UD	12	22 May 1997	Elephant & Castle Centre, London, England	Retained Commonwealth super featherweight title; Won vacant WBC International super featherweight title
29	Win	27–1–1	Rakhim Mingaleyev	TKO	2 (8), 2:14	8 Apr 1997	York Hall, London, England	
28	Win	26–1–1	Martín Ramírez	KO	1	22 Feb 1997	Kampala, Central Region, Uganda	
27	Win	25–1–1	Gary Thornhill	RTD	8 (12)	11 Dec 1996	Elephant & Castle Centre, London, England	Retained Commonwealth super featherweight title
26	Win	24–1–1	Jackie Gunguluza	TKO	7 (12), 2:07	26 Jan 1996	Metropole Hotel, Brighton, England	Retained Commonwealth super featherweight title
25	Win	23–1–1	Tony Pep	PTS	12	30 Sep 1995	Cardiff Arms Park, Cardiff, Wales	Won Commonwealth super featherweight title
24	Win	22–1–1	Mark Smith	TKO	4	7 Jul 1995	National Ice Rink, Cardiff, Wales	
23	Win	21–1–1	Peter Till	RTD	4 (8), 3:00	13 May 1995	Kelvin Hall, Glasgow, Scotland	
22	Win	20–1–1	Alberto López	RTD	3 (8)	18 Feb 1995	Bath & West Country Showground, Shepton Mallet, England	
21	Win	19–1–1	Armando Juan Reyes	PTS	8	12 Oct 1994	Ponds Forge Arena, Sheffield, England	
20	Win	18–1–1	Bamana Dibateza	TKO	5 (6)	9 Apr 1994	Mansfield Leisure Centre, Mansfield, England	
19	Win	17–1–1	Charles Shepherd	TKO	5 (8)	9 Feb 1994	York Hall, London, England	
18	Win	16–1–1	Derek Amory	TKO	1 (4)	28 Nov 1993	Elephant & Castle Centre, London, England	
17	Win	15–1–1	Russell Mosley	KO	4	17 Apr 1993	ARCO Arena, Sacramento, California, U.S.	
16	Win	14–1–1	Abe Gomez	UD	8	24 Feb 1993	Riviera Hotel & Casino, Paradise, Nevada, U.S.	
15	Win	13–1–1	César Guzmán	KO	3	23 Jan 1993	Edmonds Community College, Lynnwood, Washington, U.S.	
14	Win	12–1–1	Roberto Torres	TKO	1 (6), 1:55	26 Dec 1992	Sahara Hotel, Winchester, Nevada, U.S.	
13	Win	11–1–1	Roberto Torres	TKO	2 (8), 2:05	21 Oct 1991	Riviera Hotel & Casino, Paradise, Nevada, U.S.	
12	Win	10–1–1	José Manjarrez	TKO	6 (6), 1:24	21 Aug 1992	Union Plaza Casino, Las Vegas, Nevada, U.S.	
11	Draw	9–1–1	Víctor Miranda	TD	2 (6), 1:08	26 Jun 1992	Union Plaza Casino, Las Vegas, Nevada, U.S.	
10	Win	9–1	Mario Lozano	KO	2 (6), 2:53	24 May 1992	Union Plaza Casino, Las Vegas, Nevada, U.S.	
9	Win	8–1	Amador Martínez	TKO	2 (6), 0:50	28 Mar 1992	Aladdin Theatre, Paradise, Nevada, U.S.	
8	Win	7–1	Chris Crespin	TKO	3 (6), 0:48	14 Feb 1992	Aladdin Hotel & Casino, Paradise, Nevada, U.S.	
7	Win	6–1	Rubén Rivera	TKO	5 (6), 1:31	30 Nov 1991	Aladdin Hotel & Casino, Paradise, Nevada, U.S.	
6	Win	5–1	Danny Gonzalez	KO	1	29 Oct 1991	Phoenix, Arizona, U.S.	
5	Loss	4–1	Norberto Bravo	TKO	2 (4), 2:03	6 Jul 1991	Union Plaza Casino, Las Vegas, Nevada, U.S.	
4	Win	4–0	Juan Carlos Lopez	KO	4	12 Jun 1991	Bren Events Center, Irvine, California, U.S.	
3	Win	3–0	Kevin Childrey	KO	2 (4), 1:11	2 Jun 1991	Union Plaza Casino, Las Vegas, Nevada, U.S.	
2	Win	2–0	Jorge López	UD	4	26 Mar 1991	Sands Hotel and Casino, Paradise, Nevada, U.S.	
1	Win	1–0	Gilberto Diaz	RTD	3 (4), 3:00	18 Mar 1991	Mirage Hotel & Casino, Paradise, Nevada, U.S.	
