= Steven Conway (boxer) =

English boxer

Personal information
- Nickname: Super
- Nationality: English
- Born: 6 October 1977 (age 48) Hartlepool, England
- Height: 5 ft 8 in (173 cm)
- Weight: Super feather/Light/Light welter/Welter/Light middleweight

Boxing career
- Stance: Southpaw

Boxing record
- Total fights: 46
- Wins: 34 (KO 7)
- Losses: 12 (KO 6)

"Super" Steven Conway (born 6 October 1977 in Hartlepool) is an English professional Super feather/Light/Light welter/Welter/Light middleweight boxer of the 1990s and 2000s who as a professional won the International Boxing Organization (IBO) World light middleweight title against Mihaly Kotai, and lost it to Attila Kovács, and was a challenger for the World Boxing Organization (WBO) Inter-Continental super-featherweight title against Gary Thornhill, and the British Boxing Board of Control (BBBofC) British super featherweight title against Alex Arthur.
