= Nedal Hussein =

Australian boxer (born 1977)

Personal information
- Nickname: Skinny
- Born: 1 December 1977 (age 48) Australia
- Height: 5 ft 7 in (1.70 m)
- Weight: Bantamweight; Super-bantamweight; Featherweight; Super-featherweight; Lightweight

Boxing career
- Stance: Orthodox

Boxing record
- Total fights: 48
- Wins: 43
- Win by KO: 27
- Losses: 5

Nedal "Skinny" Hussein (born 1 December 1977) is an Australian professional boxer who competed from 1997 to 2007.

Hussein won several titles, including: the Australian super bantamweight title, Australian bantamweight title, International Boxing Federation (IBF) Pan Pacific featherweight title, World Boxing Federation (WBF) featherweight title, World Boxing Union (WBU) super bantamweight title, World Boxing Organization (WBO) Asia Pacific super featherweight title, International Boxing Federation (IBF) Pan Pacific super featherweight title, International Boxing Organization (IBO) Inter-Continental super featherweight title, and Commonwealth super bantamweight title.

Hussein was a challenger for the World Boxing Council (WBC) International super bantamweight title, fighting Manny Pacquiao. He took part in the World Boxing Council (WBC) super bantamweight title against Óscar Larios, World Boxing Organization (WBO) featherweight title against Scott Harrison, Oriental and Pacific Boxing Federation (OPBF) featherweight title against Hiroyuki Enoki, and Oriental and Pacific Boxing Federation (OPBF) super featherweight title against Takashi Uchiyama. His fighting weight varied from bantamweight to lightweight.

== Professional boxing record ==
48 fights	43 wins	5 losses
By knockout	27	2
By decision	15	3
By disqualification	1	0

No.	Result	Record	Opponent	Type	Round, time	Date	Location	Notes
48	Loss	43–5	Takashi Uchiyama	KO	8 (12), 1:32	8 Sep 2007	Korakuen Hall, Tokyo, Japan	For vacant OPBF super featherweight title
47	Win	43–4	Moses Seran	KO	5 (8), 0:53	10 Aug 2007	Club Marconi, Bossley Park, Sydney, Australia	
46	Win	42–4	Pedro Malco	UD	8	15 Dec 2006	Fraternity Bowling Club, Fairy Meadow, Australia	
45	Loss	41–4	Hiroyuki Enoki	UD	12	16 Sep 2006	Korakuen Hall, Tokyo, Japan	For OPBF featherweight title
44	Win	41–3	Kosol Sor Vorapin	KO	2 (8), 0:55	16 Jun 2006	Sleeman Sports Complex, Chandler, Australia	
43	Win	40–3	Petch Windy Gym	UD	8	5 May 2006	Bellevue Function Centre, Bankstown, Australia	
42	Loss	39–3	Scott Harrison	UD	12	5 Nov 2005	Braehead Arena, Glasgow, Scotland	For WBO featherweight title
41	Win	39–2	Mick Shaw	KO	2 (12), 2:10	26 Aug 2005	RSL Club, Auburn, Sydney, Australia	Won vacant IBO Inter-Continental super featherweight title
40	Win	38–2	Aree Phosuwangym	TKO	5 (10), 2:54	1 Jul 2005	Bellevue Function Centre, Bankstown, Australia	
39	Win	37–2	Obote Ameme	KO	1 (8), 0:36	27 Mar 2005	State Sports Centre, Homebush Bay, Sydney, Australia	
38	Loss	36–2	Óscar Larios	UD	12	27 Nov 2004	MGM Grand Garden Arena, Paradise, Nevada, U.S.	For WBC super bantamweight title
37	Win	36–1	Decha Kokietgym	KO	1 (8), 0:46	8 Oct 2004	Panthers World of Entertainment, Penrith, Australia	
36	Win	35–1	Pedro Javier Torres	TKO	6 (10), 0:01	27 Aug 2004	Panthers World of Entertainment, Penrith, Australia	
35	Win	34–1	Achhan Buahom	KO	1 (12), 1:41	16 Jul 2004	Panthers World of Entertainment, Penrith, Australia	Won vacant IBF Pan Pacific super featherweight title
34	Win	33–1	Fernando David Saucedo	DQ	9 (12), 1:05	21 May 2004	Badgery's Pavilion, Homebush Bay, Sydney, Australia	Won vacant WBO Asia Pacific super featherweight title
33	Win	32–1	Donny Suratin	KO	1 (8), 1:01	7 Mar 2004	Panthers World of Entertainment, Penrith, Australia	
32	Win	31–1	Marcelo Gabriel Ackermann	TKO	1 (10)	8 Aug 2003	Panthers World of Entertainment, Penrith, Australia	
31	Win	30–1	Nobunaga Satsuma	KO	2 (8), 1:32	5 May 2003	Central Gym, Osaka, Japan	
30	Win	29–1	Leed Shabu	KO	1 (8)	23 Mar 2003	Bellevue Function Centre, Bankstown, Australia	
29	Win	28–1	Samson Elnino	KO	3 (8), 2:27	19 Jan 2003	Telstra Superdome, Melbourne, Australia	
28	Win	27–1	Jackson Asiku	UD	10	25 Oct 2002	Star Casino City, Sydney, Australia	
27	Win	26–1	Budi Wison	TKO	5 (?)	23 Aug 2002	Indosiar Studio, Jakarta, Indonesia	
26	Win	25–1	Ronnie Longakit	UD	6	8 Jun 2002	Memphis Pyramid, Memphis, Tennessee, U.S.	
25	Win	24–1	Somporn Muangsurin	UD	10	8 Feb 2002	Le Montage Function Centre, Sydney, Australia	
24	Win	23–1	Phongpetch Chuwatana	KO	2 (8)	28 Sep 2001	The Octagon, Sydney, Australia	
23	Win	22–1	Jaime Barcelona	UD	12	29 Jun 2001	Bellevue Function Centre, Bankstown, Australia	Won vacant WBU super bantamweight title
22	Win	21–1	Joe Morales	UD	6	5 May 2001	Silver Star Resort, Philadelphia, Pennsylvania, U.S.	
21	Win	20–1	Delroy Pryce	KO	3 (8), 3:00	27 Jan 2001	York Hall, London, England	
20	Loss	19–1	Manny Pacquiao	TKO	10 (12), 1:48	14 Oct 2000	Ynares Sports Center, Antipolo, Philippines	For WBC International super bantamweight title
19	Win	19–0	Nathan Sting	TKO	1 (12), 2:22	28 Apr 2000	Star City Casino, Sydney, Australia	Retained Australian and Commonwealth super bantamweight titles
18	Win	18–0	Brian Carr	PTS	12	18 Mar 2000	Kelvin Hall International Sports Arena, Glasgow, Scotland	Won vacant Commonwealth super bantamweight title
17	Win	17–0	Mohammad Khalil Payal	KO	1 (8)	8 Nov 1999	Wyong RSL Club, Wyong, Australia	
16	Win	16–0	Daniel Hoskins	TKO	5 (?)	7 Oct 1999	Wyong RSL Club, Wyong, Australia	
15	Win	15–0	Tanu in Kengkarun	TKO	3 (10)	4 Sep 1999	Empire Entertainment Centre, Windsor, Australia	
14	Win	14–0	Kongthawat Sorkitti	PTS	12	7 Jun 1999	Star City Casino, Sydney, Australia	Won WBF (Federation) featherweight title
13	Win	13–0	Dan Cody	KO	1 (10)	28 Mar 1999	Newtown RSL Club, Sydney, Australia	
12	Win	12–0	Wade Clout	UD	8	9 Nov 1998	Star City Casino, Sydney, Australia	
11	Win	11–0	Edgar Maghanoy	PTS	12	28 Sep 1998	Star City Casino, Sydney, Australia	Won inaugural IBF Pan Pacific featherweight title
10	Win	10–0	Maximo Barro	PTS	8	17 Aug 1998	Star City Casino, Sydney, Australia	
9	Win	9–0	Allan Visayas	TKO	8 (10)	24 Apr 1998	Bankstown Sports Club, Sydney, Australia	
8	Win	8–0	Dianever Orcales	UD	12	20 Feb 1998	Bankstown Sports Club, Sydney, Australia	Won vacant Australian bantamweight title
7	Win	7–0	Bienvenido Abi Abi	TKO	1 (8), 2:02	6 Dec 1997	Stockland Stadium, Townsville, Australia	
6	Win	6–0	Johnny Binge	UD	12	14 Nov 1997	Bankstown Sports Club, Sydney, Australia	Won vacant Australian super bantamweight title
5	Win	5–0	Quinton Donahue	TKO	1 (8)	2 Oct 1997	Southport RSL Club, Southport, Australia	
4	Win	4–0	Fellow Nousenga	TKO	1 (8), 0:47	5 Sep 1997	Bondi Diggers Club, Sydney, Australia	
3	Win	3–0	Pratap Sen	TKO	1 (6), 1:49	15 Aug 1997	Marrickville RSL Club, Sydney, Australia	
2	Win	2–0	Alf Wiley	TKO	1 (6)	19 Jun 1997	Bundall, Gold Coast, Queensland, Australia	
1	Win	1–0	Roberto Ruiz	UD	6	9 May 1997	Bankstown Sports Club, Sydney, Australia	

Nedal was involved in 48 fights throughout his career. 43 of these fights resulted in victory (27 by knockout and 16 by decision). Nedal has only been defeated in 5 fights (2 by knockout and 3 by decision).
