= Johnny Armour =

English boxer (born 1968)

Personal information
- Nationality: English
- Born: 26 October 1968 (age 57) Chatham, Kent, England
- Height: 5 ft 4 1/2 in (1.64 m)
- Weight: fly/super fly/bantam/super bantam/featherweight

Boxing career

Boxing record
- Total fights: 34
- Wins: 31 (KO 17)
- Losses: 3 (KO 2)

Johnny Armour (born 26 October 1968 in Chatham, Kent) is an English amateur flyweight and professional super fly/bantam/super bantam/featherweight boxer of the 1990s and 2000s.

As an amateur he won the 1990 Amateur Boxing Association of England (ABAE) flyweight title, against Paul Ingle (Scarborough ABC), boxing out of St Marys ABC (Chatham, Kent).

As a professional he won the European Boxing Union (EBU) bantamweight title, World Boxing Union (WBU) bantamweight title, and Commonwealth bantamweight title, and was a challenger for the World Boxing Union (WBU) super bantamweight title against Carlos Navarro.

His professional fighting weight varied from 115 lb (52 kg; 8 st 3 lb), i.e. super flyweight to 125 lb (56.7 kg; 8 st 13.0 lb), i.e. featherweight.

Johnny Armour was trained by Collin Moorcroft, and managed by Terry Toole.

Education: Fort Luton Secondary School in Chatham, Kent, 1980 to 1985.
