= Alex Arthur =

Scottish boxer (born 1978)

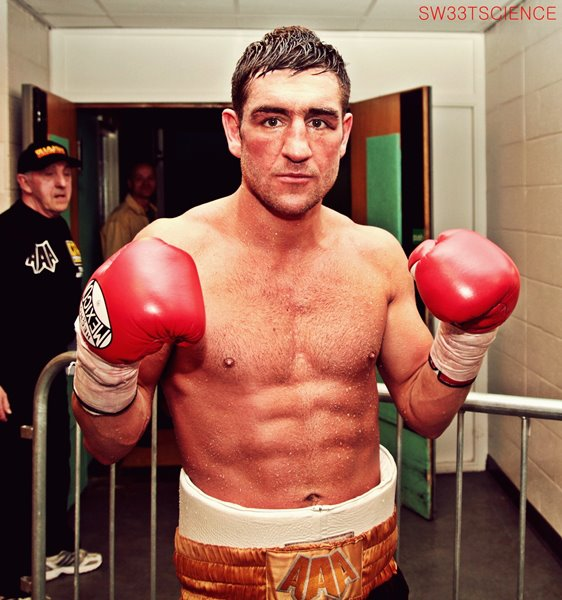
- Arthur in 2012

Personal information
- Born: 26 June 1978 (age 48) Edinburgh, Scotland
- Height: 5 ft 9 in (175 cm)
- Weight: Super featherweight

Boxing career
- Club: Leith Victoria AAC, Edinburgh
- Reach: 69 in (175 cm)
- Stance: Orthodox

Boxing record
- Total fights: 34
- Wins: 31
- Win by KO: 21
- Losses: 3
Medal record
Men's amateur boxing
Representing Scotland
Commonwealth Games
Gold medal – first place	Kuala Lumpur 1998	Featherweight
Commonwealth Championships
Silver medal – second place	1996 Mmabatho	Featherweight

Alex Arthur, MBE Born 26 June 1978 in Dumbiedykes (Edinburgh) and raised in Drummond Street on the South Side of the city, is a Scottish former professional boxer and political candidate for the Alba Party.

Competing from 2000 to 2012, he held the WBO and WBO interim super featherweight titles in 2007. At regional level, he held the British super featherweight title twice between 2002 and 2006, and the Commonwealth and EBU European super featherweight title from 2005 to 2006.

He ran as a regional candidate in the 2021 Scottish Parliament election as a member of the Alba Party, but quickly sparked controversy due to his online comments mocking travellers, an AIDS survivor, and spreading COVID-19 misinformation.

== Amateur boxing career ==
Arthur was a member of the Leith Victoria Amateur Boxing Club in Edinburgh. He represented the Scottish team at the 1998 Commonwealth Games in Kuala Lumpur, Malaysia, where he competed in the featherweight division. At the Games he won the gold medal following victories over Kassim Napa Adam of Uganda, James Swan of Australia and Marty O'Donnell of Canada in the final.

== Professional boxing career ==
=== Early professional career ===
Arthur had his first professional contest in November 2000 when he defeated fellow debutant Richmond Asante at the Wythenshawe forum in Manchester. Also on the card that day were fighters of the quality of Anthony Farnell, Junior Witter, Matthew Hatton, Michael Jennings and Jamie Moore.

After winning 11 fights in a row and picking up a couple of fringe titles on the way, Arthur managed to get a crack at the vacant British Super Featherweight title when he challenged Dewsbury's Steven Conway at the Braehead Arena in Glasgow on 19 October 2002. The win established Arthur as a force on the domestic scene and he followed up the victory with two defences against Carl Greaves and fellow Scot Willie Limond. One more victory would have given him the Lonsdale belt for keeps and that was when the undefeated prospect with a record of 16–0 ran into Longford's Michael Gomez.

=== Michael Gomez fight ===
Michael Gomez fought Arthur for the British and WBA International super featherweight titles in front of a sold out Meadowbank Stadium, Edinburgh, Scotland in October 2003. This was the first professional boxing card in the city for almost 20 years.

A war of words was waged between the two fighters prior to the fight, Arthur had stirred up the animosity between the pair stating in an interview that Gomez "gets involved in wars with journeymen" and that "looking deep into Gomez's eyes at the press conference, I'm not sure even he believes he can win. He'll be so fired up I expect it'll take me eight or nine rounds but, if his resistance has gone as people are saying, it could be a lot sooner" and "I see about 20 ways to beat him. I'm just looking forward to shutting him up.".

Arthur, who was looking to retain the Lonsdale Belt, was seen as a rising star in British boxing and was being groomed to be a future world champion. Arthur was a strong favourite to defeat Gomez and this fight was seen as a stepping stone against a Gomez who had been through too many battles and abused his body too much.

Gomez proved his critics wrong when on the night of the fight Gomez arrived in prime condition and with aggression, determination and desire. Eventually, Gomez won this bad tempered contested fight with an explosive knock out of Arthur in the fifth round. Arthur's performance in the early rounds and his resilience before the KO saw the bout hailed as one of the best fights in Britain for a decade. Boxing promoter Frank Warren called the fight "the greatest contest seen on these shores since Nigel Benn beat Gerald McClellan in 1995".

=== Comeback ===
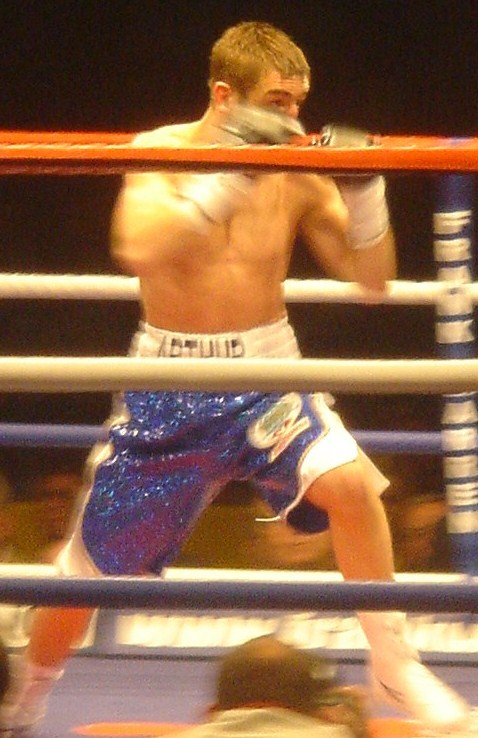
Alex Arthur in 2008

He made his comeback the next year on 27 March 2004 by stopping Michael Kizza in the first round for the IBF Inter-Continental super featherweight title. He made two defences of that fringe title before lining himself up for a shot at Commonwealth Super-Featherweight champion Craig Docherty. To make matters more interesting the British title was now vacant again meaning that the Docherty fight would be for the British and Commonwealth Super-Featherweight titles. The fight took place at the Meadowbank Sports Centre in Edinburgh and ended with Arthur knocking Docherty out in the 9th round. Arthur was once again a force to be reckoned with.

=== European Champion ===
To fully seal his comeback Arthur's next fight was against the reigning European champion at super feather Boris Sinitsin. He managed to defeat the experienced Russian with a wide 12 round decision and so held the British, Commonwealth and European title belts at the same time. He put all three of them on the line in his next fight against fellow Scot Ricky Burns winning another 12 round decision. It was however the only time he would defend all three at once, his next two fights saw him only defend the European title against mandatory challenger Sergey Gulyakevich and Spain's Sergio Palomo.

=== WBO Champion ===
On 21 July 2007, he stopped Koba Gogoladze in the tenth round to win the interim WBO super-featherweight title. He made his first defence on 15 December 2007 against fellow Brit Steve Foster Jr. In what was supposed to be an easy tune up fight, Arthur struggled to win a close unanimous decision. It was a terrible start from the champion, for the first four rounds he was getting beaten to the punch and taking heavy blows from Foster. He regained his composure in the middle rounds and even knocked down his opponent in the 9th with a body shot. However two rounds later in round 11 Arthur got floored himself after taking a right hand that knocked him straight through the ropes. He managed to regain his composure and won a close decision.

Following the Foster win Arthur geared himself up to take on Dominican Joan Guzmán who held the full version of the title. However, Guzmán decided that he wanted to move up a weight division and chose not to compete against Arthur. This decision by Guzmán meant that the interim titleholder was now recognised as the organisation's world champion.

Arthur however surrendered the title in his very next fight, losing a unanimous points decision to England's Nicky Cook at the MEN Arena in Manchester on 9 September 2008. Arthur claimed that he had been "robbed" he also added "It was three English judges – in England. A fighter knows in his heart if he has won or lost a fight and I really thought I had won", Other observers however thought that the decision was fair and that Cook fully deserved his win.

=== Second comeback ===
Since losing to Nicky Cook in 2008 Arthur went on to win against Mohamed Benbiou on 19 June 2009 via TKO in Round 1 at the Bellahouston Sports Centre in Glasgow, Arthur then lost on points to Nigel Wright on 5 December 2009 at the Metro Radio Arena, Newcastle. In 2010 Arthur had 2 back to back wins against Peter McDonagh on 4 September 2010 and Jay Morris on 4 December 2010 both in Glasgow.

Arthur was appointed Member of the Order of the British Empire (MBE) in the 2012 Birthday Honours for services to boxing.

=== Amazing Alex Arthur Promotions and Retirement ===
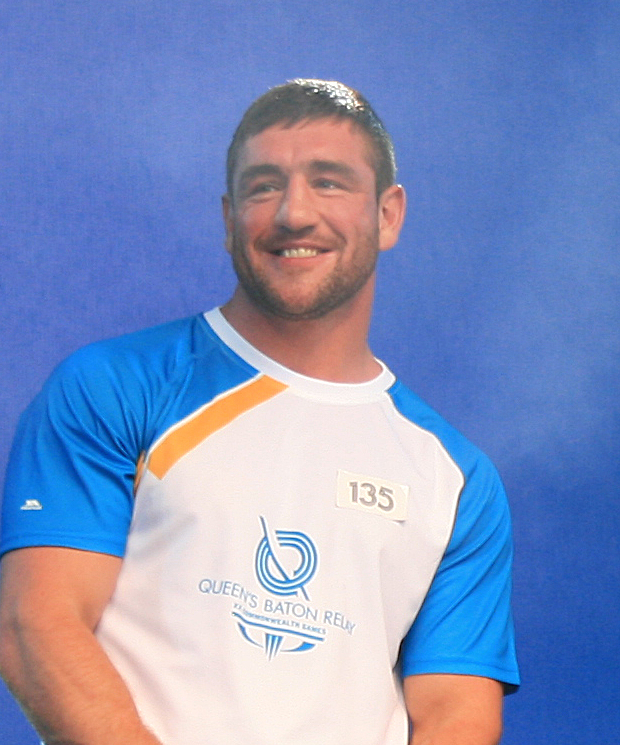
Arthur at a publicity event ahead of the 2014 Commonwealth Games

In 2011 Arthur went into promoting with his own AAA Promotions. His first event took place at the Meadowbank Stadium in Edinburgh on 27 August 2011 where Arthur fought Aleksander Vakhtangashvili and won via TKO in the fourth round. On 14 April 2012 AAA Promotions staged their second and final event again at the Meadowbank Stadium where Arthur faced Michael Frontin and won via points after 8 rounds.

On 26 June 2013 Arthur officially retired from boxing after 14 months without a fight.

=== Professional boxing record ===
34 fights	31 wins	3 losses
By knockout	21	1
By decision	10	2

No.	Result	Record	Opponent	Type	Round, time	Date	Location	Notes
34	Win	31–3	(Mauritius) Michael Frontin	PTS	8	14 Apr 2012	(United Kingdom) Meadowbank Stadium, Edinburgh, Scotland	
33	Win	30–3	(Georgia (country)) Aleksander Vakhtangashvili	TKO	4 (10)	27 Aug 2011	(United Kingdom) Meadowbank Stadium, Edinburgh, Scotland	
32	Win	29–3	(United Kingdom) Jay Morris	PTS	8	4 Dec 2010	(United Kingdom) Braehead Arena, Glasgow, Scotland	
31	Win	28–3	(United Kingdom) Peter McDonagh	PTS	8	4 Sep 2010	(United Kingdom) Kelvin Hall, Glasgow, Scotland	
30	Loss	27–3	(United Kingdom) Nigel Wright	PTS	8	5 Dec 2009	(United Kingdom) Metro Radio Arena, Newcastle, England	
29	Win	27–2	(France) Mohamed Benbiou	TKO	1 (8)	19 Jun 2009	(United Kingdom) Bellahouston Sports Centre, Glasgow, Scotland	
28	Loss	26–2	(United Kingdom) Nicky Cook	UD	12	6 Sep 2008	(United Kingdom) M.E.N. Arena, Manchester, England	Lost WBO super featherweight title
27	Win	26–1	(United Kingdom) Stephen Foster	UD	12	15 Dec 2007	(United Kingdom) Meadowbank Stadium, Edinburgh, Scotland	Retained WBO interim super featherweight title
26	Win	25–1	(United States) Koba Gogoladze	TKO	10 (12)	21 Jul 2007	(United Kingdom) International Arena, Cardiff, Wales	Won WBO interim super featherweight title
25	Win	24–1	(Spain) Sergio Palomo	TKO	5 (12)	4 Nov 2006	(United Kingdom) Kelvin Hall, Glasgow, Scotland	Retained EBU European super featherweight title
24	Win	23–1	(Belarus) Sergey Gulyakevich	TD	7 (12)	29 Apr 2006	(United Kingdom) Meadowbank Stadium, Edinburgh, Scotland	Retained EBU European super featherweight title
23	Win	22–1	(United Kingdom) Ricky Burns	UD	12	18 Feb 2006	(United Kingdom) Meadowbank Stadium, Edinburgh, Scotland	Retained British, Commonwealth, and EBU European super featherweight titles
22	Win	21–1	(Russia) Boris Sinitsin	UD	12	23 Jul 2005	(United Kingdom) Meadowbank Stadium, Edinburgh, Scotland	Won EBU European super featherweight title
21	Win	20–1	(United Kingdom) Craig Docherty	KO	9 (12)	8 Apr 2005	(United Kingdom) Meadowbank Stadium, Edinburgh, Scotland	Won Commonwealth and vacant British super featherweight titles
20	Win	19–1	(Argentina) Nazareno Gaston Ruiz	UD	12	3 Dec 2004	(United Kingdom) Meadowbank Stadium, Edinburgh, Scotland	Retained IBF Inter-Continental super featherweight title
19	Win	18–1	(Ghana) Eric Odumase	RTD	6 (12)	22 Oct 2004	(United Kingdom) Royal Highland Showground, Edinburgh, Scotland	Retained IBF Inter-Continental super featherweight title
18	Win	17–1	(Uganda) Michael Kizza	KO	1 (12)	27 Mar 2004	(United Kingdom) Meadowbank Stadium, Edinburgh, Scotland	Won vacant IBF Inter-Continental super featherweight title
17	Loss	16–1	(United Kingdom) Michael Gomez	TKO	5 (12)	25 Oct 2003	(United Kingdom) Meadowbank Stadium, Edinburgh, Scotland	Lost British and WBA Inter-Continental super featherweight titles
16	Win	16–0	(United Kingdom) Willie Limond	TKO	8 (12)	12 Jul 2003	(United Kingdom) Braehead Arena, Glasgow, Scotland	Retained British super featherweight title
15	Win	15–0	(South Africa) Patrick Malinga	TKO	6 (12)	22 Mar 2003	(United Kingdom) Braehead Arena, Glasgow, Scotland	Won vacant WBA Inter-Continental super featherweight title
14	Win	14–0	(United Kingdom) Carl Greaves	TKO	6 (12)	14 Dec 2002	(United Kingdom) Telewest Arena, Newcastle, England	Retained British super featherweight title
13	Win	13–0	(United Kingdom) Steven Conway	KO	4 (12)	19 Oct 2002	(United Kingdom) Braehead Arena, Glasgow, Scotland	Won vacant British super featherweight title
12	Win	12–0	(Belarus) Pavel Patipko	KO	1 (6)	17 Aug 2002	(United Kingdom) Cardiff Castle, Cardiff, Wales	
11	Win	11–0	(Russia) Nikolay Eremeev	RTD	5 (12)	8 Jun 2002	(United Kingdom) Braehead Arena, Glasgow, Scotland	Won vacant WBO Inter-Continental super featherweight title
10	Win	10–0	(Poland) Dariusz Snarski	TKO	10 (12)	11 Mar 2002	(United Kingdom) Kelvin Hall, Glasgow, Scotland	Won IBF Inter-Continental super featherweight title
9	Win	9–0	(Bulgaria) Wladimir Borov	TKO	2 (8)	19 Jan 2002	(United Kingdom) York Hall, London, England	
8	Win	8–0	(Hungary) Laszlo Bognar	TKO	3 (8)	17 Nov 2001	(United Kingdom) Bellahouston Sports Centre, Glasgow, Scotland	
7	Win	7–0	(Russia) Alexey Slyauchin	TKO	1 (6)	27 Oct 2001	(United Kingdom) M.E.N. Arena, Manchester, England	
6	Win	6–0	(Russia) Dmitry Gorodetsky	TKO	1 (4)	15 Sept 2001	(United Kingdom) M.E.N. Arena, Manchester, England	
5	Win	5–0	(Ukraine) Rakhim Mingaleyev	PTS	4	21 Jul 2001	(United Kingdom) Ponds Forge Arena, Sheffield, England	
4	Win	4–0	(United Kingdom) Dafydd Carlin	PTS	4	28 Apr 2001	(United Kingdom) International Arena, Cardiff, Wales	
3	Win	3–0	(United Kingdom) Woody Greenway	RTD	2 (4)	26 Mar 2001	(United Kingdom) Wembley Conference Centre, London, England	
2	Win	2–0	(United Kingdom) Eddie Nevins	TKO	1 (4)	10 Feb 2001	(United Kingdom) Kingsway Leisure Centre, Widnes, England	
1	Win	1–0	(United Kingdom) Richmond Asante	TKO	1 (4)	25 Nov 2000	(United Kingdom) Wythenshawe Forum, Manchester, England	

== Political career ==
On 29 March 2021, Arthur was announced as a regional candidate for the Alba Party in the 2021 Scottish Parliament election. Shortly after the announcement, controversy emerged over his previous comments on social media, where he compared Romanian beggars to "juicy overfed pigs", openly mocked an AIDS survivor, and spread misinformation on COVID-19 vaccination. After issuing an apology, where he explained that his comments were a product of his working class upbringing, Arthur continued to retweet anti-immigrant content and bragged that members of his family could out-fight commenters who criticised him.

Following Alba's disappointing results, where they failed to win any constituency or regional seats, Arthur stated that he remained proud to be an Alba candidate and suggested his party had achieved more in the fight for Scottish independence than the 1320 Declaration of Arbroath. In response to further criticism of his political achievements he told a member of the public "Shut up you clown you don't know me", before stating "my 'genes' are very powerful!".

Since the 2021 Scottish Parliament election, Arthur has continued sharing his views online. In response to renewed calls for Scottish students to get vaccinated against Covid-19 in September 2021, Arthur publicly mocked an overweight Scottish government spokesperson, saying he should "Maybe lose some weight. Protect yourself from the bigger killers, Heart disease & obesity". New measures for children with gender dysphoria prompted a backlash, with Arthur stating "Kids at that age don't know if they're going for a shite or a haircut". When accused of being anti-English, Arthur stated "I'd rather suck Boris Johnson's big toe than Nicola's tits". He has also suggested that Scotland's Olympic prospects would improve by copying the strategies of the Russian committee involved in the doping scandal, stating "We need a bit of Putin in Scotland!".

Achievements
Vacant Title last held by Michael Gomez	British Junior Lightweight Champion; 19 October 2002 – 25 October 2003	Succeeded by Michael Gomez
Preceded by Craig Docherty	Commonwealth Junior Lightweight Champion; 8 April 2005 – 21 July 2007; Vacated	Vacant Title next held by Kevin Mitchell
New title	WBO Super Featherweight Champion; Interim title 21 July 2007 – 14 May 2008; Promoted	Vacant Title next held by Orlando Salido
Preceded by Joan Guzmán; Vacated	WBO Super Featherweight Champion; 14 May 2008 – 9 September 2008	Succeeded by Nicky Cook
