= Gábor Vető =

Hungarian boxer (born 1988)

Personal information
- Nationality: Hungarian
- Born: 19 December 1988 (age 37) Várpalota, Hungary
- Height: 1.82 m (6 ft 0 in)
- Weight: Light welterweight

Boxing career
- Reach: 185 cm (73 in)
- Stance: Orthodox

Boxing record
- Total fights: 31
- Wins: 31
- Win by KO: 23
- Losses: 0
- Draws: 0
- No contests: 0

Gábor Vető (born 19 December 1988) is a Hungarian professional boxer. He is the former WBC Youth World Lightweight Champion. Since 2010, the native Hungarian has been living in Bern, Switzerland.

== Amateur career ==
Vető was a member of the Hungarian national amateur team and had over 80 amateur bouts.

== Professional career ==
On 21 April 2012, Vető beat the Ugandan Justin Juuko to win the Global Boxing Union World light welterweight title. On 15 October 2011, Vető beat Michael Kizza to win the vacant Global Boxing Union World and German International light welterweight titles. On 17 April 2010, Vető beat Omari Ramadan by T.K.O. to win the WBC Youth World lightweight title.

== Professional boxing record ==
31 fights	31 wins	0 losses
By knockout	23	0
By decision	8	0

No.	Result	Record	Opponent	Type	Round, time	Date	Location	Notes
31	Win	31–0	Michael Ogundo	MD	8	26 Dec 2016	Kursaal, Bern, Switzerland	
30	Win	30–0	Mfaume Mfaume	TKO	6 (8)	1 Oct 2016	Waisenhausplatz, Bern, Zwiterland	
29	Win	29–0	Tamaz Avdiev	MD	6	14 May 2016	Gundeldinger Casino, Basel, Switzerland	
28	Win	28–0	Justin Juuko	KO	2 (12), 2:14	21 Apr 2012	Hotel Marsoel, Chur, Switzerland	Retained GBU light welterweight title
27	Win	27–0	Thomas Hengstberger	TKO	5 (12)	19 Nov 2011	Sporthalle Elzach, Elzach, Germany	Retained GBU and GBA International light welterweight titles
26	Win	26–0	Michael Kizza	KO	1 (12), 1:57	15 Oct 2011	Sporthalle Schuetzenmatt, Burgdorf, Switzerland	Won inaugural GBU and GBA International light welterweight titles
25	Win	25–0	James Kimori	KO	8 (8), 2:47	2 Jul 2011	Imtech-Arena, Hamburg, Germany	
24	Win	24–0	Freddy Lemmerer	TKO	2 (6)	16 Apr 2011	Hotel Marsoel, Chur, Switzerland	
23	Win	23–0	Leonard Crețu	KO	2 (6)	26 Mar 2011	Sporthalle Elzach, Elzach, Germany	
22	Win	22–0	Alfred Kotey	PTS	8	11 Dec 2010	Boxgym Graf, Torgau, Germany	
21	Win	21–0	Magomed Hakimov	TKO	2 (6)	23 Oct 2010	Mehrzweckhalle, Winden im Elztal, Germany	
20	Win	20–0	Rajabu Maoja	KO	1 (10), 0:31	2 Oct 2010	Toy Market Kibera, Nairobi, Kenya	Won vacant Central Africa and Eastern lightweight titles
19	Win	19–0	Philipp Schuster	UD	6	11 Sep 2010	Commerzbank-Arena, Frankfurt, Germany	
18	Win	18–0	Jegise Tovmaszjan	MD	4	29 May 2010	Festsaal Lendorf, Spittal an der Drau, Austria	
17	Win	17–0	Edward Roy Suter	TKO	2 (6), 2:58	22 May 2010	Rocky's Box Club, Zurich, Switzerland	
16	Win	16–0	Omari Ramadan	TKO	3 (10), 2:11	17 Apr 2010	ArteCad Arena, Tramelan, Switzerland	Won vacant WBC Youth lightweight title
15	Win	15–0	Uwe Tritschler	KO	4 (8)	27 Mar 2010	Sporthalle Elzach, Elzach, Germany	
14	Win	14–0	Stefan Paulić	TKO	2 (6)	28 Feb 2010	Lugner City, Vienna, Austria	
13	Win	13–0	Obote Ameme	UD	4	12 Dec 2009	PostFinance Arena, Bern, Switzerland	
12	Win	12–0	Francesco Capuano	TKO	1 (6), 0:54	28 Nov 2009	Kőrösi Csoma School Gymnasium, Érd, Hungary	
11	Win	11–0	Rocco Cipriano	PTS	4	14 Nov 2009	Sporthalle Kollnau, Waldkirch, Germany	
10	Win	10–0	Imre Simon	TKO	3 (8)	4 Sep 2009	Zenica, Zenica-Doboj Canton, Bosnia and Herzegovina	
9	Win	9–0	Mohesen Moradian	TKO	2 (10), 2:34	25 Jul 2009	Castle of Várpalota, Várpalota, Hungary	
8	Win	8–0	Enrico Lauricella	TKO	6 (8)	4 Jul 2009	Steinberghalle, Elzach, Germany	
7	Win	7–0	Anton Glofák	TKO	1 (4)	27 Jun 2009	City Hall, Komárno, Slovakia	
6	Win	6–0	Trayan Dimitrov	TKO	3 (6), 2:30	16 May 2009	ArteCad Arena, Tramelan, Switzerland	
5	Win	5–0	Hubert Romankiewicz	PTS	6	9 May 2009	Dragon's Club, Hügelsheim, Germany	
4	Win	4–0	Timo Joos	KO	1 (6), 0:15	2 May 2009	Haus des Gastes, Elzach, Germany	
3	Win	3–0	Përparim Hajdini	TKO	2 (4), 1:41	21 Mar 2009	Hanns-Martin-Schleyer-Halle, Stuttgart, Germany	
2	Win	2–0	Ibragim Zeliev	TKO	2 (6)	15 Mar 2009	Bulldog Gym, Karlsruhe, Germany	
1	Win	1–0	Arthur Hambardzumyan	TKO	2 (4)	21 Feb 2009	Dragon's Club, Hügelsheim, Germany	
