= Gary Thornhill =

English boxer (born 1970)

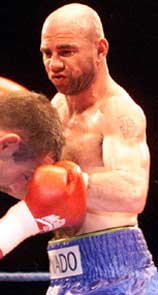

Personal information
- Nickname: Tornado
- Nationality: British
- Born: 11 February 1968 (age 58) Liverpool, England
- Height: 5 ft 6 1/2 in (169 cm)
- Weight: Featherweight, super featherweight

Boxing career
- Reach: 67 in (170 cm)
- Stance: orthodox

Boxing record
- Total fights: 30
- Wins: 24
- Win by KO: 12
- Losses: 5
- Draws: 1

Gary Thornhill (born 11 February 1968) is a former English professional boxer who fought at featherweight and super featherweight.

He is a former World Boxing Organization (WBO) Intercontinental super featherweight champion, as well as a BBBofC super featherweight central area champion. Thornhill also held the Lonsdale belt before being stripped after failing a drugs test.

== Amateur career ==
Thornhill started boxing at the age of 12, he went on to be an England international at the age of 18. Thornhill had 80 bouts as an amateur, winning 71 of them. He boxed for Higherside A.B.C, St Helens Star A.B.C, then Transport A.B.C where he met his trainer, George Vaughan, who carried his career through to the paid ranks when Thornhill turned 24.

== Professional career ==
Thornhill turned professional in February 1993 at the Epic Leisure Centre, Ellesmere Port, Cheshire, England. In his debut Thornhill defeated Sheffield's Brian Hickey with a fourth round knockout.

Thornhill fought five world champions during his career: Justin Juuko-WBO World title holder (for the Commonwealth title), Michael Gomez-WBU World title holder (for the British title), Scott Harrison-WBO & WBC World title holder, Nicky Cook-WBA World title holder, Stephen Foster-WBU World title holder. At super-featherweight Thornhill was central area champion, WBO Intercontinental champion, and he also went on to win a British featherweight title fight with a 9th round stoppage against fellow Liverpudlian Richie Wenton in May 2000, but was stripped of the title after testing positive for amphetamines after the fight and banned for six months.
