= Richie Wenton =

British former boxer (born 1967)

Personal information
- Nationality: British
- Born: 28 October 1967 (age 58) Liverpool, England
- Height: 5 ft 8 in (173 cm)
- Weight: Super bantamweight, featherweight

Boxing career
- Reach: 70 in (178 cm)

Boxing record
- Total fights: 30
- Wins: 24
- Win by KO: 10
- Losses: 6

Richie Wenton (born 28 October 1967) is a British former boxer who was British super bantamweight champion between 1994 and 1996, and fought for European and World titles.

== Career ==
Born in Liverpool, Wenton was encouraged to take up boxing by his father who had been a successful amateur boxer in his time, and won several schoolboy and junior tiles as an amateur as well as representing England.

He made his professional debut in December 1988 with a second-round knockout of Miguel Matthews, and won 16 of his first 17 fights, including a win over Mark Johnson, the only loss to Floyd Churchill in September 1992.

In April 1994 he faced Bradley Stone for the newly created British super bantamweight title at the York Hall, Bethnal Green. Wenton stopped Stone in the tenth round to become British champion. Stone appeared not to be badly hurt but collapsed hours later and died two days later after suffering a blood clot on the brain.

Wenton considered quitting boxing but returned to the ring in October, retiring in the fifth round against Neil Swain, later stating "My mind just wasn't there. I had a lot of things on my mind tonight, a lot on my shoulders." In March 1995 he made a successful defence of his British title, stopping Paul Lloyd in the fifth round, and dedicating the win to Stone.

In June 1995 Wenton won by unanimous decision over Guianan Michael Parris to take the WBO Inter-Continental super bantamweight title. Four months later he challenged for Vincenzo Belcastro's European title, the defending champion getting the decision.

He made a second defence of the British title in February 1996, beating Wilson Docherty on points to win the Lonsdale Belt outright. He fought only once again that year, and only once in 1997, but in October 1998, after more than a year out of the ring, faced Marco Antonio Barrera for the vacant WBO World super bantamweight title; Wenton retired at the end of the third round after twice being knocked down.

He then moved up to featherweight, and in May 2000 fought for the vacant British title against Gary Thornhill; Thornhill stopped him in the eighth round, but failed a drugs test after the fight, testing positive for amphetamines, and was stripped of the title at a hearing four months later. Wenton faced Commonwealth champion Scott Harrison in March 2001 with both titles at stake; Wenton was stopped in the fourth round, and subsequently retired from boxing.

He went on to work as an electrician in the gas and oil industry. He also acted as UK coordinator for the World Boxing Foundation.

Richie's brother Nigel was also a professional boxer.
