= Peter McDonagh =

Irish boxer

Personal information
- Nickname: Connemara Kid
- Nationality: Irish
- Born: 22 December 1977 (age 48) Galway, Ireland
- Height: 5 ft 9 in (175 cm)
- Weight: Lightweight; Light-welterweight; Welterweight; Light-middleweight

Boxing career
- Stance: Orthodox

Boxing record
- Total fights: 58
- Wins: 28
- Win by KO: 3
- Losses: 28
- Draws: 2

Peter McDonagh (born 22 December 1977) is an Irish professional boxer.

== Controversial Irish title fight against Michael Gomez ==
McDonagh fought Michael Gomez on 28 January 2006 for the Irish lightweight title on the undercard of a Bernard Dunne fight at the National Stadium, Dublin, Ireland.

Gomez had been out of the ring for almost a year and was due to fight Scottish Willie Limond for the WBU lightweight title but turned down that opportunity for a chance to fight for an Irish title.

After the fight was signed Gomez stated "I just can't wait to get my hands on that Irish title because I've been desperate to fight in Ireland for years".

Leading up to the fight McDonagh was seeing the famous paranormalist Uri Geller as mind coach to help him mentally prepared for the fight and Geller travelled with him to Dublin for the fight. Gomez commented that ""I'm not sure Uri Geller will be of much use to him though because there won't be any spoons in that ring for him to bend. The only thing I plan on bending is some of McDonagh's ribs with my body punches".

The first four rounds were relatively close with Gomez leading according to pundits but the fight ended in the fifth round in bizarre circumstances when for no apparent reason Gomez stopped fighting and failed to defend himself, he then received a number of unanswered punches from McDonagh before being floored. Gomez rose from the canvas immediately but appeared to ignore the referee and walk towards his corner while the referee continued with his count, and then left the ring as the referee was waving the fight off. The RTÉ commentator Steve Collins commented that "I smell a rat, something's not right here".

The Boxing Union of Ireland (BUI) suspended both fighters purses, and investigated reports of unusual betting patterns and large sums of money being placed on McDonagh to win inside the distance and more specifically in the fifth round after on McDonagh to win the fight in the fifth-round had been cut from 125–1 to 18–1 by the afternoon of the bout.

Following an investigation, the BUI released the purses to each of the fighters, stating "Michael Gomez and Peter McDonagh confirmed that neither they, their families, nor any person in their camp, as far as they were aware, betted on the fight", but expressing disappointment that the bookmaker Boylesports, who had suspended wagering on the bout due to the unusual betting patterns, had chosen not to reply to the investigators' queries.

Gomez later explained the loss by saying that "it was all very simple, I just came to a decision in there that I need to retire from boxing full stop".

Gomez further indicated that he planned to pursue a career in body building. McDonagh, meanwhile, claimed that he had won because Uri Geller had helped him mentally prepare for the fight.

== Irish ranking ==
In 2005, McDonagh was ranked 4th by the Boxing Union of Ireland in the light welterweight division. He is currently ranked second in irish-boxing.com's rankings of lightweights after moving down a division, and is ranked number 2 in the current Boxing Union of Ireland lists.
