= Ian McLeod (boxer) =

Scottish boxer

Personal information
- Nationality: Scottish
- Born: Ian McLeod; 11 June 1969 (age 57) Kilmarnock, Scotland
- Weight: super-featherweight

Boxing career
- Stance: orthodox

Boxing record
- Total fights: 14
- Wins: 11
- Win by KO: 8
- Losses: 2
- Draws: 1
- No contests: 0

Ian McLeod (born 11 June 1969) is a former professional boxer who fought in the super-featherweight division.

He is a former Commonwealth and IBO super featherweight champion.
