= Lee McAllister =

Scottish boxer (born 1982)

Lee William McAllister
Personal information
- Nickname: The Aberdeen Assassin
- Nationality: Scottish
- Born: 5 October 1982 (age 43) Aberdeen, Scotland
- Height: 175 cm (5 ft 9 in)
- Weight: Lightweight; Light-welterweight

Boxing career
- Stance: Orthodox

Boxing record
- Total fights: 50
- Wins: 47
- Win by KO: 19
- Losses: 3(2)

Lee "Aberdeen Assassin" McAllister (born 5 October 1982) is a Scottish professional boxer nicknamed the "Aberdeen Assassin". McAllister held the Commonwealth lightweight and light-welterweight titles, the IBO International light-welterweight title, and challenged once each for the European and British titles.

On 22 July 2018 he defeated British WBU #1 contender Danny Williams by knock out in round 10 to gain the GBU Heavyweight Champion title. He captured the junior-middleweight WBU World Championship on 5 October 2019 against Richmond Djarbeng by 2nd-round TKO. Lee is also a promoter with Assassins Promotions boxing, which holds events in his hometown of Aberdeen, where he also runs and operates a boxing gym called Assassin's Health & Fitness.

== Professional boxing career ==
=== Early career ===
In September 2003, McAllister gained a points win over Jeff Thomas for the British Masters light-welterweight title. The judges scored it by a margin 95–97. McAllister later captured the vacant Scottish Area title at the Beach Ballroom, Aberdeen on 27 June 2006, with a stoppage victory over Stuart Green in the 8th round. This was followed up with two decisive points wins at the same venue, the latter a 100–91 victory against former Ghanaian super-featherweight champ Ben Odamattey, for the vacant WBF International lightweight title.

=== WBU titles ===
Lee McAllister gained his first world championship on 6 October 2007, when he fought former super-featherweight Commonwealth Champion "Hot Property" Craig Docherty for the WBU Lightweight title at the Beach Ballroom, Aberdeen. McAllister won the clash when Docherty's corner threw the towel in halfway through the ninth round. It seems Docherty suffered a potential perforated eardrum early in the fight. He gained his second WBU title at the Aberdeen Exhibition centre on 29 March 2008, when he defeated Mihaita Mutu for the vacant light-welterweight title.

=== Route to major title ===
When McAllister vacated his WBU titles and proceeded to sign with Glasgow-based promoter Tommy Gilmour, he was named number one contender to undefeated lightweight prospect John Murray for the British lightweight title. On 17 January at the Robin Park Centre in Wigan, England, Murray stopped McAllister in the 8th round.

After his loss to John Murray, promoter Tommy Gilmour, lined up some top European talent for McAllister to fight. McAllister defeated light welterweight French contender Abdoulaye Soukouna in a 79–73 points victory at the Beach Ballroom, Aberdeen on 14 March, hoping to earn another shot at a major title.

=== Commonwealth title ===
Lee McAllister gained the chance to fight for the Commonwealth lightweight title left vacant by Amir Khan. McAllister took on Ghana's champion Godfred Sowah (11–3) on 19 June, at the Aberdeen Beach Ballroom. Sowah was the mandatory challenger for the title before it was vacated and had the power to choose any opponent he wished. Tommy Gilmour was quick to make the fight happen and revealed "We've paid an awful lot of money for the fight, much more than we would like to have paid." The event was touted as Aberdeen's biggest ever for boxing, but was not broadcast live on television because Gilmour had to take whatever venue was available to him and ignore Sky's scheduling in order to receive Commonwealth Boxing Council approval for the clash to go ahead.

McAllister acquired the Commonwealth lightweight title after stopping Godfred Sowah 1 minute, 43 seconds into the third round in front of a delighted home crowd. Despite talk of a £100,000 showdown with fellow Scot Gary McArthur, McAllister has said he is looking to set his sights on Frenchman Anthony Mazaache for a shot at the EBU (European) title before going for the lucrative domestic bout.

Next up, in a bout held on 17 November 2009, broadcast live from the Beach Ballroom online on 110Sport.tv, McAllister took out Scottish champ Charlie King by KO in the 7th round in his second defense of the Commonwealth title.

McAllister's final defense of his Commonwealth title was a lacklustre unanimous decision victory over Ghana's Sam Amoako at the Bellahouston Leisure Centre, Glasgow. The bout was televised on Sky, and McAllister apologised to the TV viewers and fans watching for his poor showing. "On behalf of the paying public and the viewers at home, I would like to apologise for my performance on Friday night," he said. "The Aberdeen Assassin wasn't at his best. That was not five per cent of Lee McAllister, I was very disappointed.".

=== Moving up to light-welterweight ===
After being out for more than a year due to an elbow injury, McAllister announced his comeback – an IBO International light welterweight title bout, against Itsvan Nagy (15–8). On 26 February, Nagy was TKOed by McAllister in the 6th round. His next bout gave him an opportunity to make Scottish boxing history and be the first man to hold two Commonwealth titles simultaneously when he took on journeyman Isaac Quartey (7–6) of Ghana for the vacant light-welterweight strap. He won by UD. His next bout was against journeyman Karoly Lakatos, who was stopped in the third round. His sights were then set on Denis Shafikov, the EBU title holder. In front of a sold-out crowd at the Aberdeen Exhibition Centre, live on Sky Sports, he lost his European title challenge. He retired on his stool after the seventh round citing an elbow injury. It was later confirmed that it was a recurrence of an old injury that had kept McAllister out of the ring for 13 months earlier in his career; there were boos from the paying crowd that felt let down by McAllister's display of the night. The way the fight ended left his manager Tommy Gilmour admitting his career would suffer because of this defeat, and promoter Frank Maloney claiming McAllister would never fight on Sky again.

McAllister vacated the Commonwealth light-welterweight title to let Eddie Doyle fight Willie Limond whilst he tried to recover from the injury that forced him to retire in the European Title fight. McAllister returned after 14 months out and had his last fight against Ivan Godor. Although he won an easy points decision against Ivan Godor, McAllister once again broke down during a training camp to try to regain his Commonwealth title. After consultations with his doctors the decision was made for McAllister to retire rather than risk long-term damage to his body. Upon his retirement from boxing McAllister started a property maintenance and construction company called A-Team Property and Maintenance.

In 2016 he came out of retirement and in 2017 won World Boxing Foundation World Welterweight Title by stopping Frank Dodzi in 3 rounds.

In 2017 McAllister added more titles to his collection with both the PBC International and Commonwealth Titles at Super-Welterweight with a stoppage victory over Ishmael Tetteh.

In April 2018 McAllister stepped in at the last moment to fight Lee Kellet at Heavyweight. McAllister walked away with a points decision over Kellet.

In June 2018 it was announced McAllister would be fighting heavyweight Danny Williams who previously defeated Mike Tyson earlier in his career. They fought at the Beach Ballroom in Aberdeen for the obscure "GBU Heavyweight World Championship". Lee won this fight with a 10th-round stoppage after putting Danny Williams on the canvas 3 times.

== Personal life ==
He is a fan of Aberdeen Football Club and fights in "The Dons" Red and White colours.

In 2015, he served a 3-month prison sentence for assault. McAllister was also made subject of an Anti-social Behaviour Order (ASBO) in December 2015, which banned him from Aberdeen City Centre, as well as the city's pubs and clubs.

He is the older brother of professional boxer Matthew McAllister. He has 6 children.
