= Kevin Lear =

British former professional boxer (born 1977)

Personal information
- Nickname: "Real Hammer"
- Nationality: English
- Born: Kevin Lear; 3 May 1977 (age 49) Whitechapel, London, England
- Weight: Super featherweight

Boxing career
- Stance: orthodox

Boxing record
- Total fights: 14
- Wins: 14
- Win by KO: 6
- Losses: 0
- Draws: 0
- No contests: 0

Kevin Lear (born 3 May 1977) is a British former professional boxer who fought at super featherweight and lightweight.

He is a former WBU super featherweight champion.

== Professional career ==
Lear turned professional in September 1999 at the York Hall, Bethnal Green, London, England. In his debut Lear defeated Bulgarian Demir Nanev with a fourth round technical knockout.

== Victory over Michael Gomez ==
The West Ham based fighter built up an unbeaten 12–0 record, before moving up considerably in class and fighting Michael Gomez on 1 June 2002, at the MEN Arena on the undercard of the Ricky Hatton versus Eamonn Magee fight.

From the outset of the fight, Lear, a former Amateur Boxing Association of England champion, kept Gomez at bay with his sharp jab. Lear inflicted damage to Gomez whose nose began to bleed heavily in the sixth round. By the eighth round, Gomez was slowing suffering the effects of Lear's continuing barrage of combinations. At the end of the eight round Gomez's trainer Brian Hughes retired Gomez giving Lear a surprising victory.

Following his victory over Gomez, Lear only fought once more, before having to retire as a result of serious and long-standing shoulder injuries.
