= Nicky Cook =

English boxer

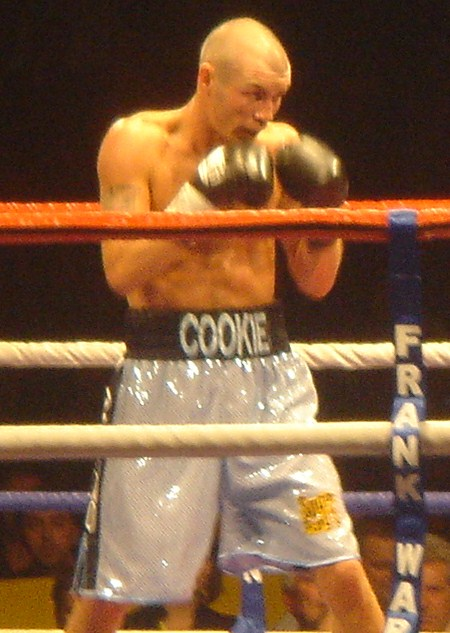
- Cook in 2008

Personal information
- Nickname: Cookie
- Born: 13 September 1979 (age 46) Stepney, London, England
- Height: 5 ft 6 1/2 in (169 cm)
- Weight: Featherweight; Super featherweight

Boxing career
- Stance: Orthodox

Boxing record
- Total fights: 33
- Wins: 30
- Win by KO: 16
- Losses: 3

Nicky Cook (born 13 September 1979), sometimes known by his ring name Cookie, is a British retired professional boxer who competed from 1998 to 2011. He held the WBO super featherweight title from 2008 to 2009. He challenged once for the WBO featherweight title in 2007 and again for the WBO super featherweight title in 2011. At the regional level, he held the Commonwealth featherweight title from 2003 to 2005, the British featherweight title in 2005, and the EBU European featherweight title from 2004 to 2006.

== Early professional career ==
Cook turned professional in December 1998 in Hertfordshire, England. In his debut, Cook defeated English journeyman Sean Grant with a first round knockout.

After fifteen fights in December 2001, unbeaten Cook beat Argentinian Marcelo Gabriel Ackermann for the vacant and lightly regarded WBF Intercontinental super featherweight title. He defended the strap twice before getting his chance to compete for the Commonwealth belt.

== British, Commonwealth and European Champion ==
In February 2003, Cook fought the Zimbabwean Meshack Kondwani for the vacant Commonwealth Featherweight belt. He defended twice against Africans David Kiilu and Anyetie Laryea before taking on Cyril Thomas for the European belt also at featherweight. He won the fight with a 9th-round knockout, he made one defence before taking on British champion Dazzo Williams in June 2005. The fight took place at the Goresbrook Leisure Center in Dagenham and was significant because it meant the British, Commonwealth and European titles were all on the line in a winner take all contest. Cook stopped Williams in the 2nd round thus holding all three belts at the same time.

== World title challenger ==
Cook defended his European title once more beating Yuri Voronin on points over 12 rounds again in Dagenham. After that he decided to concentrate on his ambition to win a real 'world' title and set his sights on current holder of the WBO Featherweight belt Scott Harrison. The fight was set for December 2006 in what would have been an England vs Scotland clash for a world belt, it never happened however as Harrison pulled out and decided to vacate the title citing difficulties making the weight. It had not helped that Harrison had also spent 13 weeks in a Spanish prison prior to the bout and had only been released in November. Cook was left frustrated and instead of fighting for the world title on the card he ended up beating Harry Ramogoadi in an eight rounder.

In July 2007, Cook finally got his chance and took on American Steve Luevano for the now vacant World Boxing Organization's (WBO) belt. The fight took place at the O2 Arena in London and ended disappointingly for Cook as he was knocked down 5 times and finally stopped in the 11th round it was his first defeat as a professional.

== WBO Champion ==
Cook got another opportunity to fight for the WBO belt in September 2008 when he decided to move up a weight division and challenge Alex Arthur for the WBO Super-Featherweight title. The fight took place at the MEN Arena in Manchester and was the chief support to Amir Khan's ill-fated match up with Colombian Breidis Prescott when he was knocked out within a minute. Cook beat Arthur over 12 rounds to win a unanimous decision. The parallels were striking between the fighters as Arthur was also a former British, Commonwealth and European champion at the higher weight, he had also been beaten only once before. After the fight Arthur claimed he had been "robbed" and also alleged that Cook had gone up to him after the fight and said "You're a great champion, you won the fight well done" thus compounding his sense of shock when the verdict was announced. On 14 March 2009, Cook was knocked down twice in the 4th round of his first defence against Puerto Rican boxer Román Martínez. Despite beating the count he was in no condition to continue and the referee stopped the contest, with the unbeaten Martínez becoming the new WBO super featherweight champion.

== WBO Title Challenge ==
Román Martínez lost the WBO super featherweight title to Ricky Burns. Nicky Cook fought Ricky Burns for the WBO super featherweight title in Liverpool's Echo Arena on 16 July 2011. Less than two minutes into the fight, Cook was stretchered off suffering a career threatening injury. Sky pundits Barry McGuigan and Glenn McCrory later questioned how Cook could have completed his training camp with such a serious back complaint. He had also spoken to a member of the Sky Sports team before the bout, claiming doctors had said the injury would get no better or no worse and would be 'something he would have to live with'. (Sky Sports Saturday Fight Night 16 July 2011)

== See also ==
- List of British featherweight boxing champions

== Professional championships ==
Preceded by Alex Arthur	WBO Super Featherweight Champion; 9 September 2008 – 14 March 2009	Succeeded by Román Martínez
