= Craig Docherty =

Scottish boxer (born 1979)

Personal information
- Nickname: Hot Property
- Born: 27 September 1979 (age 46) Glasgow, Scotland
- Height: 5 ft 7 in (170 cm)
- Weight: Super-featherweight; Lightweight; Light-middleweight

Boxing career
- Stance: Orthodox

Boxing record
- Total fights: 37
- Wins: 28
- Win by KO: 12
- Losses: 7
- Draws: 2

Craig Docherty (born 27 September 1979) is a Scottish former professional boxer. Competing from 1998 to 2017, he held the Commonwealth super-featherweight title from 2003 to 2005.

== Life and career ==
Docherty became a professional boxer in 1998 after representing Scotland in the Commonwealth Games in Kuala Lumpur Malaysia, under the promotional banner of Tommy Gilmour and began to notch up victories.

Docherty is known primarily as a body-puncher; his tactics typically centre on his methodical attacks, hurting opponents particularly with his left hook to the liver. His defense is assisted by excellent head movement and a solid chin.

After winning 12 fights, with 1 draw, and no losses, Docherty was rewarded for his progress by being granted a shot at the current British champion - Mancunian Michael Gomez, a rough-and-tumble, aggressive fighter who had over double the number of fights that Craig had. The contest was pulsating while it lasted. Docherty attempted to go toe-to-toe with Gomez, something of a foolhardy decision, as Gomez was well known for his relentlessness and heavy hands.

The fight ended inside two rounds, with Gomez battering a bloody Docherty until the referee stopped the proceedings.

Choosing to rebuild, the Glaswegian wasted no time in chalking up another three victories, before again being rewarded with a Commonwealth title shot. This came on 12 April 2003, when he squared off with Dean 'Pitbull' Pithie, in Bethnal Green, London. Despite being booed by a predominantly English crowd, Docherty dominated the bout, hurting Pithie with consistently hurtful body shots, leading to an eighth round stoppage.

The victory brought Docherty much media coverage in Scotland, in the national tabloids, and talk circulated around a possible fight with counterpart Alex Arthur. Instead, Craig, nicknamed 'Hot Property', decided to defend his belt against mandatory Ghanaian Abdul Malik Jabir, which he won by Unanimous Decision in an enthralling classic.

The gritty performance earned him much praise, and a quick-fire defense was set up with another challenger, Kpakpo Allotey, which Docherty won by sixth-round stoppage.

Before deciding to meet old friend and Commonwealth Games team-mate Arthur, Doc decided to challenge the experienced Boris Sinitsin, the Russian European champion. It was a step too far however, and Sinitsin managed to use his experience and stamina to slightly outwork Docherty. Despite that, one judge had it a draw.

The clamour for a unification with British champion Alex Arthur still mounted however, and the fight was inevitable. Purse bids led to the fight originally being scheduled for Docherty's backyard of Glasgow, but Frank Warren later came up with the highest bid, and the fight was set for Meadowbank, Edinburgh.

It did not come to that however, as Arthur managed to pound out a ninth-round stoppage. Docherty dominated early on, but seemed hurt by a big Arthur uppercut midway through the contest. Body shots led to his misery, and the ninth-round knockdown ended Docherty's fight.

In 2010 Docherty took time out of Boxing to compete in professional Mixed Martial Arts under The tutelage of Glasgow's Dinky Ninja Fight Team, where he had 2 professional fights 1 win 1 loss record before deciding to give boxing another go in 2013 in the Super Welterweight division. In 2015 he won the vacant WBU World Boxing Union, World super welterweight title via a 6th-round knockout of former Irish amateur star and 2 time world military games gold medalist Michael Kelly of Dundalk. In 2017 added the vacant WBF (World Boxing Foundation) World Super Welterweight title by stopping Hungarian Peter Orlik inside 6 rounds.

== Notes ==
- http://www.thenational.scot/sport/14860757.Boxing__Scotland___s_champions__all_18_of_them_/ The National. Retrieved 8 February 2017
- https://web.archive.org/web/20180209005016/http://fightnetwork.com/category/news/?s=Craig%20Docherty
- https://web.archive.org/web/20201130005237/http://www.worldboxingfoundation.com/news/docherty-claims-wbf-world-super-welterweight-crown-in-scotland * https://hannibalboxing.com/tough-as-fuck-never-give-in-all-of-that-stuff-craig-docherty-looks-back/
- https://www.the13thround.com/phpBB2/viewtopic.php?t=123427 * https://web.archive.org/web/20170614223548/http://www.worldboxingfoundation.com/current-wbf-world-champions
