= Stefy Bull =

English boxer and boxing trainer (born 1977)

Personal information
- Other names: Supersonic
- Nationality: (England) English
- Born: Andrew Stephen Bulcroft; 1977 (age 48–49)
- Height: 5 ft 10 in (178 cm)
- Weight: Lightweight

Boxing career
- Stance: Southpaw

Boxing record
- Wins: 29
- Win by KO: 7
- Losses: 7
- Draws: 1

Stefy Bull (born 1977) is an English former professional boxer, trainer and promoter. He is also a convicted cocaine dealer.

== Boxing ==
Bull had a 15-year professional boxing career starting in 1995. His most notable fights were an unsuccessful challenge for the English lightweight title against Scott Lawton in 2006, a defeat by future world champion Amir Khan in 2007 and a loss to ex-professional footballer turned boxer Curtis Woodhouse in 2010, after which he retired.

Turning to training and managing, he guided Terri Harper to world titles at three weights. Operating out of his gym in Conisbrough, Yorkshire, other high-profile fighters Bull was involved with included Jamie McDonnell, Maxi Hughes and Jason Cunningham

== Cocaine supply conviction ==
In February 2025, Bull was convicted of conspiracy to supply cocaine after a four-day trial at Sheffield Crown Court. Having denied the charge, he later admitted his guilt and blamed financial difficulties caused by the COVID-19 pandemic for his crime. On 5 September 2025, Bull was sentenced to 10 years in prison.
