= David Burke (boxer) =

English boxer

Personal information
- Born: 3 February 1975 (age 51) Liverpool, Merseyside
Medal record
Men's boxing
Representing England
European Amateur Championships
Bronze medal – third place	1996 Vejle	Featherweight

David Burke (born 3 February 1975) is an English boxer who won the bronze medal in the Men's Featherweight (– 57 kg) division at the 1996 European Amateur Boxing Championships in Vejle, Denmark.

Nicknamed Burkey, Burke represented Great Britain at the 1996 Summer Olympics in Atlanta, Georgia. There he was stopped in the first round of the Men's Featherweight division by Germany's Falk Huste. He was affiliated with the Salisbury Amateur Boxing Club.
