= Anthony Farnell =

British boxer

Anthony Farnell (born 1978), known as the Woodhouse Warrior, was born in Manchester and grew up in Failsworth, Greater Manchester. He is a former WBU middleweight champion. He retired from the ring in 2004 to concentrate on training.

It was announced on 31 October 2008 that Farnell would train World Amateur Lightweight Champion, Frankie Gavin for his entry into the professional ranks.

Titles in pretence
| Preceded by Ruben Groenewald | World Middleweight Champion; WBU recognition 28 September 2002 – 5 April 2003 | Succeeded by Wayne Elcock |
| Preceded by Lawrence Murphy | World Middleweight Champion; WBU recognition 6 March 2004 – 12 June 2004 | Succeeded by Eugenio Monteiro |
