= World Boxing Union =

Former boxing organization

- Abbreviation: WBU
- Founder: Jon W. Robinson
- Founded at: London, England
- Purpose: Boxing sanctioning organization
- Headquarters: Organization dissolved
- Region served: Worldwide
- president: Jon Robinson

The World Boxing Union (WBU) was a boxing sanctioning body. The original WBU was founded in January 1995 by IBF European representative, boxing journalist, actor and former holder of the title of Britain's heaviest man Jon W. Robinson. It sanctioned boxing with various promoters worldwide. Following Robinson's death in 2004, the organization became dormant and was 2009 dissolved.

An organization serving the same purpose and with the same name, was formed in Germany in 2010 under the leadership of Torsten Knille.

== List of WBU heavyweight champions ==
Name	Duration of reign	Defenses	Notes
George Foreman (USA)	March 29, 1995 – 1997	2	Foreman was recognized as champion after he was stripped of the IBF title
Corrie Sanders (RSA)	November 15, 1997 – May 20, 2000	3	Defeated Ross Purity
Hasim Rahman (USA)	May 20, 2000 – April 21, 2001	0	Relinquished the title in order to fight Lennox Lewis for the IBF, IBO and WBC titles
Johnny Nelson (GBR)	November 24, 2001 – December 4, 2001	0	Defeated Alexander Vasiliev. Relinquished the title in order to concentrate on defending his WBO Cruiserweight title
Georgi Kandelaki (GEO)	December 21, 2002 – January 2004	0	Defeated Alexander Vasiliev. Kandelaki either relinquished or was stripped of the title
Matt Skelton (GBR)	February 25, 2005 – January 26, 2009	0	Skelton relinquished the title

== Other WBU champions (selected) ==
Other past WBU champions include Sirimongkol Singwancha, Sornpichai Kratingdaenggym, Pongsaklek Wonjongkam, Ricky Hatton, Eamonn Magee, Tony Oakey, Corrie Sanders, Enzo Maccarinelli, Lee McAllister, Angel Manfredy, George Scott, Hasim Rahman, Willie Limond, Craig Docherty, Michael Gomez, Kevin Lear, Anthony Farnell, Jimmy Lange, Derry Mathews, Choi Tseveenpurev, Jeremy Williams, Cristian Charquero, Wayne Elcock, Roy Jones Jr., David Burke, Vinny Pazienza, and Micky Ward. Tyson “Lights Out” Hunter

In addition, Carlos Contreras defeated challenger Victor Rabanales by 8RTKO.

- List of WBU world champions
