= Boxing at the 1992 Summer Olympics – Lightweight =

Lightweight boxing at the Games of the XXV Olympiad
- Venue: Pavelló Club Joventut Badalona
- Dates: 30 July – 8 August 1992
- Competitors: 29 from 29 nations

Medalists
1st place, gold medalist(s)		Oscar De La Hoya	United States
2nd place, silver medalist(s)		Marco Rudolph	Germany
3rd place, bronze medalist(s)		Namjilyn Bayarsaikhan	Mongolia
3rd place, bronze medalist(s)		Hong Sung-sik	South Korea

The men's lightweight event was part of the boxing programme at the 1992 Summer Olympics. The weight class allowed boxers of up to 60 kilograms to compete. The competition was held from 30 July to 8 August 1992. 29 boxers from 29 nations competed.

== Medalists ==
Gold	Oscar De La Hoya; United States
Silver	Marco Rudolph; Germany
Bronze	Namjilyn Bayarsaikhan; Mongolia
Bronze	Hong Sung-sik; South Korea

== Results ==
The following boxers took part in the event:

Rank	Name	Country
1	Oscar De La Hoya	United States
2	Marco Rudolph	Germany
3T	Namjilyn Bayarsaikhan	Mongolia
3T	Hong Sung-sik	South Korea
5T	Rashi Ali Hadj Matumla	Tanzania
5T	Julien Lorcy	France
5T	Toncho Tonchev	Bulgaria
5T	Ronald Chavez	Philippines
9T	Mauricio Ávila	Guatemala
9T	Jacobo Garcia	Virgin Islands
9T	Shigeyuki Dobashi	Japan
9T	Dariusz Snarski	Poland
9T	Moses Odion	Nigeria
9T	Henry Kungsi	Papua New Guinea
9T	Artur Grigoryan	Unified Team
9T	Billy Irwin	Canada
17T	Felix Bwalya	Zambia
17T	Kamal Marjouane	Morocco
17T	Delroy Leslie	Jamaica
17T	Vasile Nistor	Romania
17T	Justin Rowsell	Australia
17T	János Petrovics	Hungary
17T	Adilson Silva	Brazil
17T	Arshad Hussain	Pakistan
17T	Julio González	Cuba
17T	Óscar Palomino	Spain
17T	Yun Yong-chol	North Korea
17T	Emil Rizk	Egypt
17T	Alan Vaughan	Great Britain

=== First round ===
- Namjilyn Bayarsaikhan (MGL) – BYE
- Mauricio Avila (GUA) – BYE
- Rashid Matumla (TAN) def. Felix Bwalya (ZAM), 16:8
- Julien Lorcy (FRA) def. Kamal Marjouane (MAR), 11:7
- Shigeyuki Dobashi (JPN) def. Delroy Leslie (JAM), 11:5
- Marco Rudolph (GER) def. Vasile Nistor (ROM), 10:5
- Dariusz Snarski (POL) def. Justin Rowsell (AUS), RSC-3
- Moses Odion (NGR) def. Janos Petrovics (HUN), 18:8
- Oscar De La Hoya (USA) def. Adilson Rosa Silva (BRA), RSC-3
- Henry Kungsi (PNG) def. Arshad Hussain (PAK), 13:9
- Tontcho Tontchev (BUL) def. Julio González Valladares (CUB), 14:12
- Artur Grigorian (EUN) def. Óscar Palomino (ESP), 11:10
- Hong Sung-Sik (KOR) def. Yun Yong-chol (PRK), 11:2
- Ronald Chavez (PHI) def. Emil Rizk (EGY), 18:10
- William Irwin (CAN) def. Alan Vaughan (GBR), RSCH 3rd round

=== Second round ===
- Namjilyn Bayarsaikhan (MGL) def. Mauricio Avila (GUA), 15:0
- Rashid Matumla (TAN) def. Jacobo Garcia (ISV), 12:2
- Julien Lorcy (FRA) def. Shigeyuki Dobashi (JPN), RSC-2
- Marco Rudolph (GER) def. Dariusz Snarski (POL), 10:1
- Oscar De La Hoya (USA) def. Moses Odion (NGR), 16:4
- Tontcho Tontchev (BUL) def. Henry Kungsi (PNG), 11:2
- Hong Sung-Sik (KOR) def. Artur Grigorian (EUN), 9:3
- Ronald Chavez (PHI) def. William Irwin (CAN), 8:1

=== Quarterfinals ===
- Namjilyn Bayarsaikhan (MGL) def. Rashid Matumla (TAN), 9:6
- Marco Rudolph (GER) def. Julien Lorcy (FRA), 13:10
- Oscar De La Hoya (USA) def. Tontcho Tontchev (BUL), 16:7
- Hong Sung-Sik (KOR) def. Ronald Chavez (PHI), KO-1

=== Semifinals ===
- Marco Rudolph (GER) def. Namjilyn Bayarsaikhan (MGL), WO
- Oscar De La Hoya (USA) def. Hong Sung-Sik (KOR), 11:10

=== Final ===
- Oscar De La Hoya (USA) def. Marco Rudolph (GER), 7:2
