= Stefano Zoff =

Italian boxer (born 1966)

Personal information
- Nickname: Il Pirata
- Born: 17 March 1966 (age 60) Monfalcone, Friuli-Venezia Giulia, Italy
- Height: 5 ft 9 in (175 cm)
- Weight: Featherweight; Super featherweight; Lightweight

Boxing career
- Stance: Orthodox

Boxing record
- Total fights: 58
- Wins: 43
- Win by KO: 17
- Losses: 12
- Draws: 3

Stefano Zoff (Italian pronunciation: [ˈsteːfano dˈdzɔf]; born 17 March 1966) is an Italian lightweight boxer from Monfalcone, Friuli-Venezia Giulia. In 1999 he won the WBA lightweight title.

== Professional career ==
Zoff turned professional in 1989 & compiled a record of 28–6–2 before facing & defeating Julien Lorcy, to win the WBA lightweight title. He would lose the title in his first defense against Venezuelan Gilberto Serrano. Zoff would have two further attempts at a world title including against Leavander Johnson.

== Professional boxing record ==
58 fights	43 wins	12 losses
By knockout	17	4
By decision	25	7
By disqualification	1	1
Draws	3	

No.	Result	Record	Opponent	Type	Round, time	Date	Location	Notes
58	Loss	43–12–3	Yuri Ramanau	UD	12 (12)	2007-10-16	Minsk Sports Palace, Minsk, Belarus	For European lightweight title
57	Draw	43–11–3	Martin Kristjansen	SD	12 (12)	2006-12-15	Antvorskovhallen, Slagelse, Denmark	For WBO Inter-Continental lightweight title
56	Loss	43–11–2	Juan Carlos Diaz Melero	RTD	10 (12)	2005-11-04	La Cubierta, Leganés, Spain	Lost European lightweight title
55	Loss	43–10–2	Leavander Johnson	TKO	7 (12)	2005-06-17	PalaLido, Milan, Italy	For vacant IBF lightweight title
54	Win	43–9–2	Martin Kristjansen	UD	12 (12)	2005-03-12	Mazda Palace, Milan, Italy	Retained European lightweight title
53	Win	42–9–2	Michele Delli Paoli	TKO	10 (12)	2004-10-16	Verbania, Italy	Retained European lightweight title
52	Win	41–9–2	Laszlo Komjathi	UD	12 (12)	2004-03-13	Manerba del Garda, Italy	Retained European lightweight title
51	Win	40–9–2	Christophe De Busillet	TKO	7 (12)	2003-11-14	Palais des sports Marcel-Cerdan, Levallois-Perret, France	Retained European lightweight title
50	Win	39–9–2	David Burke	UD	12 (12)	2003-06-07	Casino di Campione, Trieste, Italy	Won vacant European lightweight title
49	Loss	38–9–2	Jason Cook	SD	12 (12)	2003-01-25	Recreation Centre, Bridgend, Wales, U.K.	For European lightweight title
48	Loss	38–8–2	Artur Grigorian	UD	12 (12)	2002-09-14	Volkswagen Halle, Braunschweig, Germany	For WBO lightweight title
47	Win	38–7–2	Asen Vasilev	PTS	6 (6)	2002-02-23	Milan, Italy	
46	Win	37–7–2	Bruno Wartelle	TKO	8 (12)	2001-10-20	Trieste, Italy	Retained European lightweight title
45	Win	36–7–2	Dariusz Snarski	TKO	7 (12)	2001-08-11	Monfalcone, Italy	Retained European lightweight title
44	Win	35–7–2	Djamel Lifa	KO	10 (12)	2001-05-26	Trieste, Italy	Won vacant European lightweight title
43	Win	34–7–2	Kimoun Kouassi	TKO	3 (?)	2001-02-17	Padua, Italy	
42	Win	33–7–2	Sunday Aderoju	UD	6 (6)	2000-12-22	Monfalcone, Italy	
41	Win	32–7–2	Armando Arriaga	PTS	6 (6)	2000-07-28	Monfalcone, Italy	
40	Win	31–7–2	Jean Paul Moulun	PTS	6 (6)	2000-07-01	Ferrara, Italy	
39	Win	30–7–2	Manuel Gomes	PTS	6 (6)	2000-04-12	Badia Polesine, Italy	
38	Loss	29–7–2	Gilberto Serrano	TKO	10 (12)	1999-11-13	Thomas & Mack Center, Paradise, Nevada, U.S.	Lost WBA lightweight title
37	Win	29–6–2	Julien Lorcy	SD	12 (12)	1999-08-07	La Palestre, Le Cannet, France	Won WBA lightweight title
36	Win	28–6–2	Prisco Perugino	RTD	4 (10)	1999-06-26	Benevento, Italy	Retained Italian super-featherweight title
35	Win	27–6–2	Manuel Gomes	PTS	6 (6)	1999-04-24	Ferrara, Italy	
34	Win	26–6–2	Massimo Conte	TKO	2 (12)	1998-12-30	Monfalcone, Italy	Retained Italian super-featherweight title
33	Win	25–6–2	Prisco Perugino	DQ	7 (10)	1998-07-29	Piazza Risorgimento, Avezzano, Italy	Won Italian super-featherweight title
32	Win	24–6–2	Wilson Acuna	PTS	6 (6)	1997-12-06	Palasport, Catanzaro, Italy	
31	Win	23–6–2	Manuel Fatima Dias	TKO	4 (?)	1997-07-18	San Donà di Piave, Italy	
30	Loss	22–6–2	Volodymyr Matkivskyy	TKO	5 (12)	1997-03-22	Monfalcone, Italy	Lost IBF Inter-Continental featherweight title
29	Win	22–5–2	Laureano Ramírez	PTS	12 (12)	1996-12-17	Monfalcone, Italy	Won IBF Inter-Continental featherweight title
28	Loss	21–5–2	Laureano Ramírez	PTS	12 (12)	1996-10-12	Cagliari, Italy	For vacant IBF Inter-Continental featherweight title
27	Loss	21–4–2	Billy Hardy	UD	12 (12)	1996-06-20	Sanremo Casino, Sanremo, Italy	For European featherweight title
26	Win	21–3–2	Paul Kaoma	PTS	8 (8)	1996-03-16	Palazzetto dello Sport, Decimomannu, Italy	
25	Win	20–3–2	Smal Jakupi	PTS	6 (6)	1995-10-09	San Benedetto del Tronto, Italy	
24	Win	19–3–2	Imrich Parlagi	KO	4 (?)	1995-08-12	Budoni, Italy	
23	Win	18–3–2	Jean Marc Cammalieri	TKO	3 (?)	1995-07-19	Teatro dell'Opera del Casino', Sanremo, Italy	
22	Win	17–3–2	Fabrizio Cappai	TKO	4 (12)	1995-04-21	Quartu Sant'Elena, Italy	Won Italian featherweight title
21	Win	16–3–2	Tommy Barnes	TKO	3 (?)	1994-12-17	Teatro Tenda della Fiera Campionaria, Cagliari, Italy	
20	Loss	15–3–2	Mehdi Labdouni	UD	12 (12)	1994-09-09	Fontenay-sous-Bois, France	Lost European featherweight title
19	Win	15–2–2	Stéphane Haccoun	TKO	9 (12)	1994-03-22	Charleroi, Belgium	Won European featherweight title
18	Win	14–2–2	Athos Menegola	TKO	10 (12)	1993-08-06	Follonica, Italy	Retained Italian featherweight title
17	Win	13–2–2	Gianni Di Napoli	UD	12 (12)	1993-05-07	Grosseto, Italy	Won Italian featherweight title
16	Win	12–2–2	Lajos Vidak	KO	3 (?)	1993-01-27	Orzinuovi, Italy	
15	Loss	11–2–2	Gianni Di Napoli	PTS	12 (12)	1992-03-25	Castelcivita, Italy	For vacant Italian featherweight title
14	Win	11–1–2	Massimo Bertozzi	PTS	6 (6)	1991-11-09	Casinò di Campione, Campione d'Italia, Italy	
13	Win	10–1–2	Esteban Perez Quinones	PTS	6 (6)	1991-10-25	Trieste, Italy	
12	Win	9–1–2	Jean Marc Cammalieri	PTS	6 (6)	1991-07-31	Casella, Italy	
11	Draw	8–1–2	Domenico Falcone	PTS	6 (6)	1991-07-06	Treviolo, Italy	
10	Win	8–1–1	Lofti Ben Sayel	PTS	6 (6)	1991-03-02	Pagani, Italy	
9	Win	7–1–1	Massimo Bertozzi	PTS	6 (6)	1990-11-04	Monfalcone, Italy	
8	Win	6–1–1	Charles Enisan	PTS	6 (6)	1990-10-06	Town Square, Pagliara, Italy	
7	Win	5–1–1	Mazasi Kangodi	PTS	6 (6)	1990-07-12	Trieste, Italy	
6	Win	4–1–1	Charles Enisan	PTS	6 (6)	1990-05-19	Spinello, Italy	
5	Win	3–1–1	Jean Michel Talki	TKO	4 (?)	1990-03-22	Trieste, Italy	
4	Loss	2–1–1	Prisco Visconte	DQ	4 (?)	1989-12-13	San Giuseppe Vesuviano, Italy	
3	Draw	2–0–1	Giuseppe Perrella	PTS	6 (6)	1989-11-11	Città di Castello, Italy	
2	Win	2–0	Massimo Spinelli	PTS	6 (6)	1989-10-25	Ferrara, Italy	
1	Win	1–0	Bofunga Eymono	PTS	6 (6)	1989-06-01	Monfalcone, Italy	

== See also ==
- List of world lightweight boxing champions

Sporting positions
Regional boxing titles
Preceded by Gianni Di Napoli	Italian featherweight champion 7 May 1993 – 22 March 1994; Won European title	Vacant Title next held by Fabrizio Cappai
Preceded by Stéphane Haccoun	European featherweight champion 22 March 1994 – 9 September 1994	Succeeded by Mehdi Labdouni
Preceded by Fabrizio Cappai	Italian featherweight champion 21 April 1995 – 29 July 1998; Won super-featherweight title	Vacant Title next held by Alessandro Di Meco
Preceded by Laureano Ramírez	IBF Inter-Continental featherweight champion 17 December 1996 – 22 March 1997	Succeeded by Volodymyr Matkivskyy
Preceded by Prisco Perugino	Italian super-featherweight champion 29 July 1998 – 7 August 1999; Won world title	Vacant Title next held by Prisco Perugino
Vacant Title last held by Julien Lorcy	European lightweight champion 26 May 2001 – 2002; Vacated	Vacant Title next held by Jason Cook
Vacant Title last held by Jason Cook	European lightweight champion 7 June 2003 – 4 November 2005	Vacant Title next held by Juan Carlos Diaz Melero
World boxing titles
Preceded by Julien Lorcy	WBA lightweight champion 7 August 1999 – 13 November 1999	Succeeded by Gilberto Serrano
