= Namjilyn Bayarsaikhan =

Mongolian boxer (born 1965)

Personal information
- Born: 10 August 1965 (age 61) Zavkhan, Mongolia
- Height: 171 cm (5 ft 7 in)
- Weight: 60 kg (132 lb)

Boxing career
- Weight class: Lightweight
Medal record
Men's boxing
Representing Mongolia
Olympic Games
Bronze medal – third place	1992 Barcelona	Lightweight
Asian Championships
Gold medal – first place	1989 Beijing	Lightweight
Gold medal – first place	1987 Kuwait	Lightweight

Namjilyn Bayarsaikhan (Намжилын Баярсайхан; born 10 August 1965) is a retired Mongolian boxer. At the 1992 Summer Olympics, he won the bronze medal in the men's Lightweight category. He was born in Zavkhan Province.

== Olympic results ==
- 1st round bye
- Defeated Mauricio Avila (Guatemala) 15–0
- Defeated Rashid Matumla (Tanzania) 9–6
- Lost to Marco Rudolph (Germany) walkover (W.O)
