= Marco Rudolph =

German boxer (born 1970)

- Marco Rudolph at the awards ceremony of the 1989 Chemistry Cup

Personal information
- Born: 22 May 1970 (age 56)
Medal record
Men's Boxing
Representing East Germany
European Amateur Championships
Silver medal – second place	1989 Athens	Featherweight
Representing Germany
Olympic Games
Silver medal – second place	1992 Barcelona	Lightweight
World Amateur Championships
Gold medal – first place	1991 Sydney	Lightweight
Bronze medal – third place	1995 Berlin	Lightweight
European Amateur Championships
Bronze medal – third place	1991 Gothenburg	Lightweight

Marco Rudolph (born 22 May 1970 in Zittau, Saxony) is a retired German boxer, who won the Lightweight Silver medal at the 1992 Summer Olympics.

== Professional career ==
Rudolph began his professional career in 1995 and had limited success. He fought Artur Grigorian in 1998 for the WBO Lightweight Title, but was TKO'd in the 6th. Rudolph retired after the fight with a record of 13-1-0.

== Amateur career ==
Record: 207-28-1

- 1987 German National Featherweight Champion
- 1988 European Junior Featherweight Champion
- 1989 German National Featherweight Champion
- 1989 2nd place at Featherweight at the 1989 European Amateur Boxing Championships, losing to Kirkor Kirkorov of Bulgaria in final.
- 1991 3rd place at 1991 European Amateur Boxing Championships, losing to Vasile Nistor of Romania by 1st-round TKO.
- 1991 German National Lightweight Champion
- 1991 World Amateur Lightweight Champion in Sydney, Australia.
  - Oscar De La Hoya (United States) won on points
  - Julien Lorcy (France) won on points
  - Vasile Nistor (Romania) won on points
  - Artur Grigorian (Unified Team) won on points
- 1992 German National Lightweight Champion
- Silver medalist at Lightweight the 1992 Barcelona Olympic Games.
  - Vasile Nistor (Romania) won on points
  - Dariusz Snarski (Poland) won on points
  - Julien Lorcy (France) won on points
  - Namjilyn Bayarsaikhan (Mongolia) won on points
  - Oscar De La Hoya (United States) lost on points
- 1993 World Amateur Boxing Championships in Tampere, Finland, competed at Lightweight. Lost in 2nd round Damian Austin of Cuba.
- 1993 2nd place in German Amateur Championships as a Lightweight, losing to Heiko Hinz in the final.
- 1994 Lightweight Gold Medalist at World Cup competition in Bangkok, Thailand.
  - Mekhak Kazarian (Armenia) won on points
  - Godwin Osagie (Nigeria) won on points
  - Nurlan Kalibaev (Kazakhstan) won on points
  - Bruno Wartelle (France) won on points
  - Julio Gonzalez (Cuba) won on points
- 1994 German Amateur Lightweight champion, defeating Heiko Hinz in the final.
- 1995 3rd place at Lightweight in 1995 World Amateur Boxing Championships held in Berlin, Germany.
  - Diego Corrales (United States) won on points
  - Alex Trujillo (Puerto Rico) won on points
  - Paata Gvasalia (Russia) won on points
  - Leonard Doroftei (Romania) won on points
