= Lakva Sim =

Mongolian boxer (born 1972)

Personal information
- Nickname: Mongolian Blue Wolf
- Nationality: Mongolian
- Born: Dugarbaataryn Lkhagva; March 10, 1972 (age 54) Ulaanbaatar, MPR (nowadays Mongolia)
- Height: 5 ft 7 1/2 in (171 cm)
- Weight: Super featherweight; Lightweight

Boxing career
- Reach: 70 in (178 cm)
- Stance: Orthodox

Boxing record
- Total fights: 26
- Wins: 21
- Win by KO: 18
- Losses: 4
- Draws: 1

Lakva Sim (born March 10, 1972, as Dugarbaataryn Lkhagva, Mongolian: Дугарбаатарын Лхагва) is a Mongolian former professional boxer who competed from 1995 to 2005. He is a world champion in two weight classes, having held the World Boxing Association (WBA) super-featherweight title in 1999 and the WBA lightweight title in 2004. He is also the first Mongolian boxer to capture a world title.

== Professional career ==
He turned professional in 1995 and won the WBA super featherweight by defeating Takanori Hatakeyama in 1999. In that same year he later lost the belt to Jong-Kwon Baek, and in 2002 challenged Yodsanan Sor Nanthachai for the vacant WBA super featherweight title, but lost by decision. He later moved up to lightweight and in 2004 fought Miguel Callist for the vacant WBA lightweight title, winning by TKO. Sim was outboxed and lost his belt in his next fight against Juan Diaz. In 2005, he upset Ebo Elder by a late round TKO, scoring three knockdowns. This would be his final match.

== Professional boxing record ==
26 fights	21 wins	4 losses
By knockout	18	0
By decision	3	4
Draws	1	

No.	Result	Record	Opponent	Type	Round, time	Date	Location	Notes
26	Win	21–4–1	Ebo Elder	TKO	12 (12), 0:44	Sep 16, 2005	Gwinnett Center, Duluth, Georgia, U.S.	
25	Win	20–4–1	Shawn Simmons	TKO	2 (6), 1:15	Jun 18, 2005	FedExForum, Memphis, Tennessee, U.S.	
24	Loss	19–4–1	Juan Díaz	UD	12	Jul 17, 2004	Reliant Center, Houston, Texas, U.S.	Lost WBA lightweight title
23	Win	19–3–1	Miguel Callist	TKO	5 (12), 2:20	Apr 10, 2004	Mandalay Bay Resort & Casino, Paradise, Nevada, U.S.	Won vacant WBA lightweight title
22	Win	18–3–1	Bert Navarez	KO	3 (10)	Dec 6, 2003	Gooil Highschool, Seoul, South Korea	
21	Win	17–3–1	Luis Villalta	TKO	4 (10), 0:08	Apr 12, 2003	Miccosukee Resort & Gaming, Miami, Florida, U.S.	
20	Loss	16–3–1	Yodsanan Sor Nanthachai	UD	12	Apr 13, 2002	Provincial Stadium, Nakhon Ratchasima, Thailand	For vacant WBA (Regular) super-featherweight title
19	Win	16–2–1	Hidekazu Matsunobu	TKO	6 (10), 1:58	Jan 27, 2002	Bunka Gym, Yokohama, Japan	
18	Win	15–2–1	Tetsuya Shinozaki	UD	10	Aug 21, 2001	Korakuen Hall, Tokyo, Japan	
17	Win	14–2–1	Seung Ho Yuh	UD	10	Mar 18, 2001	Jangchung Gymnasium, Seoul, South Korea	
16	Win	13–2–1	Hengky Tobias	KO	3 (10), 2:49	Dec 24, 2000	Olympic Center, Seoul, South Korea	
15	Win	12–2–1	Sang Sun Park	KO	2 (10), 1:50	Jan 30, 2000	Pohang Indoor Gymnasium, Pohang, South Korea	
14	Loss	11–2–1	Jong-Kwon Baek	SD	12	Oct 31, 1999	Gudeok Gymnasium, Busan, South Korea	Lost WBA super-featherweight title
13	Win	11–1–1	Takanori Hatakeyama	TKO	5 (12), 1:46	Jun 27, 1999	Ariake Coliseum, Tokyo, Japan	Won WBA super-featherweight title
12	Win	10–1–1	Pascal Kimaru Bruno	KO	3 (?)	Jan 23, 1999	Mongolia	
11	Win	9–1–1	Arnel Tata Abastas	KO	2 (?)	Oct 5, 1998	Mongolia	
10	Win	8–1–1	Seung Yul Hong	KO	2 (10), 1:05	May 10, 1998	Seongdonggu Hall, Seoul, South Korea	
9	Win	7–1–1	Sang Sun Park	KO	6 (10)	Feb 22, 1998	Seongdonggu Hall, Seoul, South Korea	
8	Win	6–1–1	Nikolay Kasimov	KO	7 (?)	Nov 30, 1997	Turkmenistan	
7	Draw	5–1–1	Bong Chul Kim	PTS	10	Jun 23, 1997	South Korea	
6	Loss	5–1	Yong-Soo Choi	SD	12	Feb 1, 1997	Songnam Gymnasium, Seoul, South Korea	For WBA super-featherweight title
5	Win	5–0	Gilberto Gonzalez	TKO	6 (12)	Sep 21, 1996	Siam Jusco Shopping Center, Nonthaburi, Thailand	Retained PABA super-featherweight title
4	Win	4–0	Noree Jockygym	KO	6 (12)	May 19, 1996	Mahachai Villa Arena, Samut Sakhon, Thailand	Retained PABA super-featherweight title
3	Win	3–0	Singnum Chuwattana	UD	12	Mar 23, 1996	PATA Shopping Center, Huamark, Bangkok, Thailand	Won PABA super-featherweight title
2	Win	2–0	Gab Yong Lee	KO	2 (10)	Feb 24, 1996	Gwangyang Gymnasium, Gwangyang, South Korea	
1	Win	1–0	Max Karamoy	KO	4 (12)	Dec 28, 1995	Jakarta, Indonesia	Won PABA lightweight title

== Titles in boxing ==
=== Major world titles ===
- WBA super-featherweight champion (130 lbs)
- WBA lightweight champion (135 lbs)

=== Regional/International titles ===
- PABA super-featherweight champion (130 lbs)
- PABA lightweight champion (135 lbs)

== See also ==
- List of world super-featherweight boxing champions
- List of world lightweight boxing champions

Sporting positions
Regional boxing titles
New title	PABA lightweight champion December 28, 1995 – 1996; Vacated	Vacant Title next held by Oleg Marchenko
New title	PABA super-featherweight champion March 23, 1996 – 1997; Vacated	Vacant Title next held by Kanat Sikhimbayev
World boxing titles
Preceded by Takanori Hatakeyama	WBA super-featherweight champion June 27 – October 31, 1999	Succeeded by Baek Jong-kwon
Vacant Title last held by Leonard Doroftei	WBA lightweight champion April 10 – July 17, 2004	Succeeded by Juan Díaz
