= Adilson Silva =

Adilson Silva may refer to:

- Adilson Silva (boxer), Brazilian boxer
- Adilson Silva (footballer), Portuguese footballer
- Adilson da Silva, Brazilian golfer
