= Gilberto Serrano =

Venezuelan boxer (born 1970)

Personal information
- Born: Gilberto Rafael Serrano; 19 March 1970 (age 56) Caracas, Venezuela
- Weight: Lightweight

Boxing career

Boxing record
- Total fights: 27
- Wins: 20
- Win by KO: 17
- Losses: 6
- Draws: 1

Gilberto Rafael Serrano (born March 19, 1970) is a Venezuelan former professional boxer. Serrano is most notable for having won the WBA World lightweight title during his career, which spanned from 1993 to 2004. He won the Lightweight title from Stefano Zoff in 1999 after unsuccessfully challenging Yong Soo Choi for the WBA World super featherweight title in 1998. He retained the title in his first defence after stopping Hiroyuki Sakamoto in the fifth round. However, in his next fight he lost his title to Takanori Hatakeyama via an eighth round knockout. Serrano fought for a final time on November 15, 2004, beating Luis Cardozo by a unanimous decision.

== Professional boxing record ==
27 fights	20 wins	6 losses
By knockout	16	4
By decision	4	2
Draws	1	

No.	Result	Record	Opponent	Type	Round	Date	Location	Notes
27	Win	20–6–1	(Colombia) Luis Cardozo	UD	10	Nov 15, 2001	Maracaibo, Venezuela	
26	Loss	19–6–1	(Panama) Miguel Callist	KO	2 (12)	Jun 16, 2001	Gimnasio Nuevo Panama, Juan Diaz, Panama	For WBA Fedelatin lightweight title
25	Loss	19–5–1	(Japan) Takanori Hatakeyama	TKO	8 (12)	Jun 11, 2000	Ariake Colosseum, Tokyo, Japan	Lost WBA lightweight title
24	Win	19–4–1	(Japan) Hiroyuki Sakamoto	TKO	5 (12)	Mar 13, 2000	Kokugikan, Tokyo, Japan	Retained WBA lightweight title
23	Win	18–4–1	(Italy) Stefano Zoff	TKO	10 (12)	Nov 13, 1999	(United States) Thomas & Mack Center, Las Vegas, Nevada, U.S.	Won WBA lightweight title
22	Win	17–4–1	(Colombia) Jose Zuniga Leal	PTS	10	Jun 19, 1999	Oranjestad, Aruba	
21	Win	16–4–1	(United States) Edelmiro Martinez	KO	6 (8)	Feb 20, 1999	(United States) Madison Square Garden, New York City, New York, U.S.	
20	Win	15–4–1	(Mexico) Enrique Perez	TKO	3 (?)	Aug 17, 1998	Willemstad, Curaçao	
19	Loss	14–4–1	(South Korea) Choi Yong-soo	KO	9 (12)	Apr 18, 1998	Hilton Hotel, Seoul, South Korea	For WBA super featherweight title
18	Win	14–3–1	(Portugal) Freddy Cruz	PTS	8	Nov 30, 1997	Thiais, Val-de-Marne, France	
17	Win	13–3–1	(Portugal) Manuel Fatima Dias	TKO	1 (?)	Jul 5, 1997	Complexe Sportif Mohammed V, Casablanca, Morocco	
16	Win	12–3–1	(Venezuela) Jose Luis Ochoa	TKO	1 (?)	May 17, 1997	Los Teques, Venezuela	
15	Win	11–3–1	(Portugal) Arlindo de Abreu	TKO	3 (?)	Apr 6, 1997	Thiais, Val-de-Marne, France	
14	Win	10–3–1	(Panama) Orlando Soto	TKO	2 (12)	Oct 7, 1996	Maracay, Venezuela	Won vacant WBA Fedebol lightweight title
13	Win	9–3–1	(Colombia) Catalino Julio	KO	2 (10)	Sep 6, 1996	Campito de Bocagrande, Cartagena, Colombia	
12	Win	8–3–1	(Mexico) Hector Castillo	KO	2 (?)	May 11, 1996	Willemstad, Curaçao	
11	Win	7–3–1	(Venezuela) Jose Luis Ochoa	KO	4 (12)	Apr 15, 1996	Las Tejerias, Venezuela	Won vacant Venezuelan lightweight title
10	Win	6–3–1	(Venezuela) Carlos Vega	KO	3 (?)	Oct 30, 1995	Las Tejerias, Venezuela	
9	Loss	5–3–1	(Venezuela) Marcos Guevara	TKO	7 (?)	Jul 8, 1995	Porlamar, Venezuela	
8	Win	5–2–1	(United States) Harold Bennett	UD	10	May 27, 1995	(United States) Broward Co Convention Center, Fort Lauderdale, Florida, U.S.	
7	Loss	4–2–1	(Dominican Republic) Armando Juan Reyes	PTS	10	May 15, 1995	Santo Domingo, Dominican Republic	
6	Draw	4–1–1	(Dominican Republic) Armando Juan Reyes	PTS	10	Nov 25, 1994	Santo Domingo, Dominican Republic	
5	Win	4–1	(Dominican Republic) Pascual Polanco	TKO	1 (?)	Jun 10, 1994	Marichi-parkeerterrein, Willemstad, Curaçao	
4	Win	3–1	(Venezuela) Eduardo Linares	TKO	1 (?)	Oct 30, 1993	Cumana, Venezuela	
3	Loss	2–1	(Venezuela) Santos Rebolledo	PTS	6	Jul 24, 1993	El Tigre, Venezuela	
2	Win	2–0	(Venezuela) Oswaldo Ramirez	TKO	1 (?)	May 21, 1993	Coro, Venezuela	
1	Win	1–0	(Venezuela) Leonardo Reyes	TKO	2 (?)	Apr 3, 1993	Porlamar, Venezuela	

Achievements
Preceded by Stefano Zoff	WBA lightweight champion 13 November 1999 – 11 June 2000	Succeeded by Takanori Hatakeyama
