= Julien Lorcy =

French boxer (born 1972)

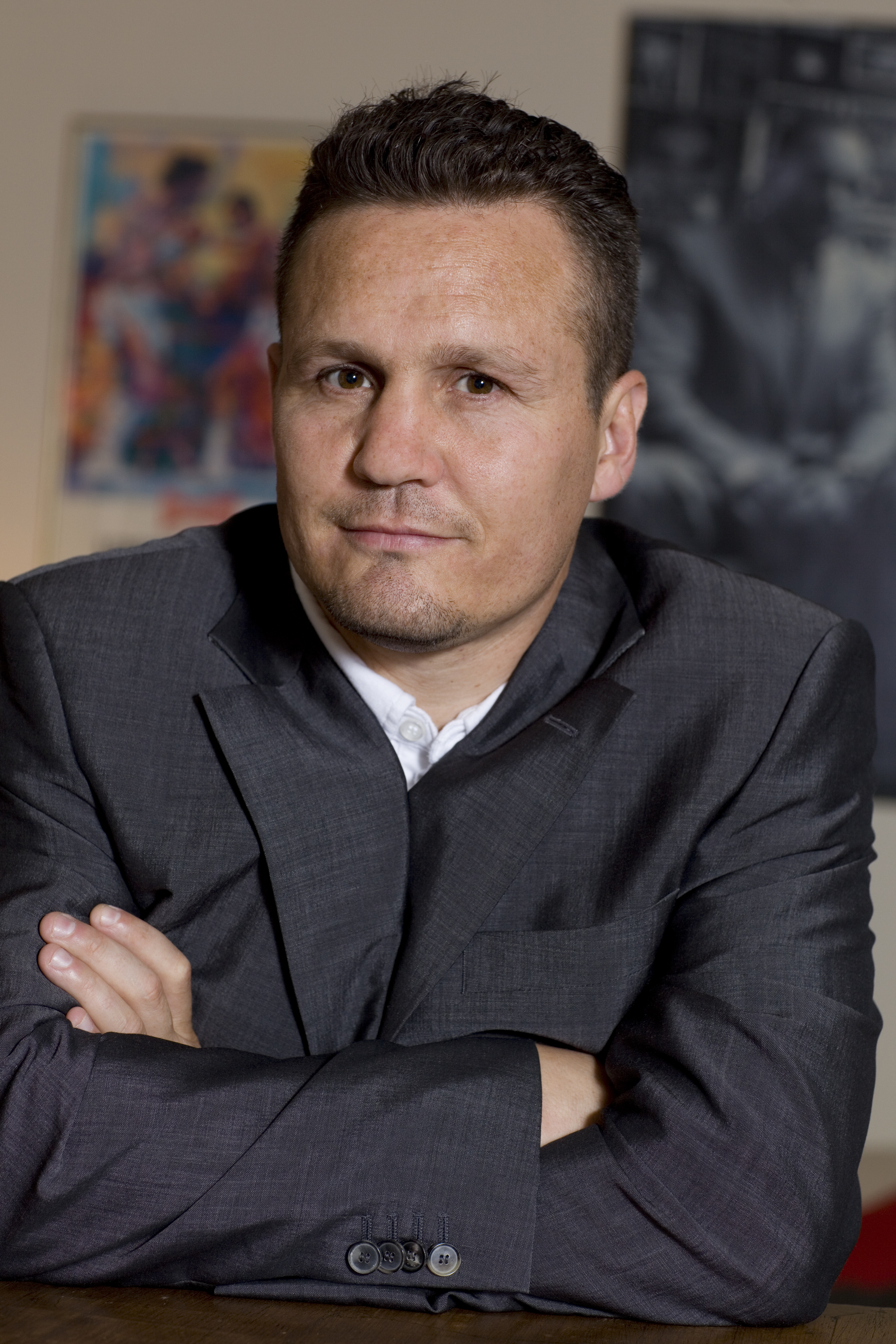
- Julien Lorcy in 2010

Personal information
- Nickname: Bobo
- Born: 12 April 1972 (age 54) Bezons, Val-d'Oise, France
- Height: 5 ft 6 in (168 cm)
- Weight: Super featherweight; Lightweight

Boxing career
- Reach: 67 in (170 cm)
- Stance: Orthodox

Boxing record
- Total fights: 62
- Wins: 56
- Win by KO: 40
- Losses: 4
- Draws: 2

Julien Lorcy (born 12 April 1972) is a French former professional boxer who held the WBA lightweight title twice.

== Amateur career ==
Record: 65-4 (36 KO)

- 1990 French National Amateur Featherweight Champion
- 1991 French National Amateur Featherweight Champion
- 1991 World Championship Featherweight competition in Sydney, Australia. Results were:
  - Defeated Billy Irwin (Canada) on points
  - Lost to Marco Rudolph (Germany) on points
- Qualified for the Olympics as a Lightweight, in trials at Berck, France. Results were:
  - Defeated Thomas Damgaard (Denmark) on points
  - Defeated Giuseppe Pasquini (Italy) on points
  - Defeated Tontcho Tontchev (Bulgaria) on points
  - Defeated Dariusz Snarski (Poland) on points
- At the 1992 Barcelona Olympic Games, lost in the quarterfinals in Lightweight competition. Results were:
  - Defeated Kamel Marjouane (Morocco) on points
  - Defeated Shigeyuki Dobashi (Japan) TKO 2
  - Lost to Marco Rudolph (Germany) on points

== Professional career ==
Nicknamed "Bobo, Julien Lorcy turned pro in 1991 and compiled a record of 34–0 before facing Arnulfo Castillo for the vacant WBO super-featherweight title, the fight ended in a draw. The pair would have a rematch the following year, the second fight would also end in a draw.

Lorcy finally became world champion in his fourth attempt when he won the WBA lightweight title in 1999 after upsetting countryman Jean Baptiste Mendy. He lost the title in his first defense to Italian Stefano Zoff later that year.

Lorcy captured the WBA lightweight title again in 2001 with a decision over Takanori Hatakeyama, but again lost the title in his first defense to Raul Horacio Balbi. He retired in 2004 after a loss to Juan Díaz in a final bid for the WBA title.

== Professional boxing record ==
| 62 fights | 56 wins | 4 losses |
|---|---|---|
| By knockout | 40 | 0 |
| By decision | 16 | 4 |
| Draws | 2 | |

| No. | Result | Record | Opponent | Type | Round, time | Date | Location | Notes |
|---|---|---|---|---|---|---|---|---|
| 62 | Loss | 56–4–2 | Juan Díaz | UD | 12 (12) | 2004-11-04 | SBC Center, San Antonio, Texas, U.S. | For WBA lightweight title |
| 61 | Win | 56–3–2 | Mustapha Abahraouhi | TKO | 4 (?) | 2003-09-27 | Mantes-la-Ville, France | |
| 60 | Win | 55–3–2 | Adrian Parlogea | TKO | 2 (10) | 2003-06-20 | Nouzonville, France | |
| 59 | Win | 54–3–2 | Ivo Golakov | TKO | 1 (10) | 2003-06-09 | Stade Pierre de Coubertin, Paris, France | |
| 58 | Win | 53–3–2 | Mustapha Abahraouhi | TKO | 4 (12) | 2002-11-29 | Saint-Jean-de-Luz, France | For vacant WBA Inter-Continental lightweight title |
| 57 | Win | 52–3–2 | Daniel Kodjo Sassou | TKO | 4 (8) | 2002-07-13 | Palavas-les-Flots, France | |
| 56 | Win | 51–3–2 | Ahmed Merichiche | KO | 4 (?) | 2002-04-06 | Abbeville, France | |
| 55 | Win | 50–3–2 | Victor Hugo Paz | UD | 8 (8) | 2002-02-23 | Palais des Sports, Marseille, France | |
| 54 | Loss | 49–3–2 | Raúl Horacio Balbi | MD | 12 (12) | 2001-10-08 | Palais des Sports, Paris, France | Lost WBA lightweight title |
| 53 | Win | 49–2–2 | Takanori Hatakeyama | UD | 12 (12) | 2001-07-01 | Super Arena, Saitama, Japan | Won WBA lightweight title |
| 52 | Win | 48–2–2 | Kimoun Kouassi | TKO | 3 (8) | 2001-05-14 | Palais des Sports, Paris, France | |
| 51 | Win | 47–2–2 | Freddy Cruz | TKO | 2 (8) | 2001-03-12 | Palais des Sports, Paris, France | |
| 50 | Win | 46–2–2 | Wilson Enrique Galli | TKO | 6 (8) | 2001-01-29 | Palais des Sports, Paris, France | |
| 49 | Win | 45–2–2 | Gianni Gelli | TKO | 3 (12) | 2000-09-16 | Châteauroux, France | Retained European lightweight title |
| 48 | Win | 44–2–2 | Roberto Vera Ibarra | KO | 2 (8) | 2000-04-08 | Palais Omnisport de Paris-Bercy, Paris, France | |
| 47 | Win | 43–2–2 | Oscar Garcia Cano | PTS | 12 (12) | 2000-01-31 | Paris, France | Won European lightweight title |
| 46 | Win | 42–2–2 | Moises Rodriguez | TKO | 5 (?) | 1999-11-15 | Paris, France | |
| 45 | Loss | 41–2–2 | Stefano Zoff | SD | 12 (12) | 1999-08-07 | La Palestre, Le Cannet, France | Lost WBA lightweight title |
| 44 | Win | 41–1–2 | Jean Baptiste Mendy | TKO | 6 (12) | 1999-04-10 | Palais Omnisport de Paris-Bercy, Paris, France | Won WBA lightweight title |
| 43 | Win | 40–1–2 | Moises Rodriguez | PTS | 8 (8) | 1999-01-25 | Palais des Sports, Paris, France | |
| 42 | Win | 39–1–2 | Fernando Alanis | KO | 1 (?) | 1998-11-30 | Palais des Sports, Paris, France | |
| 41 | Loss | 38–1–2 | Anatoly Alexandrov | MD | 12 (12) | 1998-05-16 | Palais Omnisport de Paris-Bercy, Paris, France | For vacant WBO super-featherweight title |
| 40 | Win | 38–0–2 | Benito Rodriguez | PTS | 8 (8) | 1998-02-21 | Palais Omnisport de Paris-Bercy, Paris, France | |
| 39 | Win | 37–0–2 | Paris Alexander | KO | 2 (10) | 1997-12-17 | Thiais, France | |
| 38 | Draw | 36–0–2 | Arnulfo Castillo | SD | 12 (12) | 1997-10-04 | Le Grand Dôme, Villebon-sur-Yvette, France | For vacant WBO super-featherweight title |
| 37 | Win | 36–0–1 | Roberto Apolinario Godoy | KO | 3 (10) | 1997-08-16 | La Palestre, Le Cannet, France | |
| 36 | Win | 35–0–1 | Bruno Rabanales | KO | 2 (10) | 1997-07-05 | Salle Mohammed V, Casablanca, Morocco | |
| 35 | Draw | 34–0–1 | Arnulfo Castillo | MD | 12 (12) | 1997-03-01 | Halle Georges Carpentier, Paris, France | For vacant WBO super-featherweight title |
| 34 | Win | 34–0 | Roy Simpson | TKO | 1 (?) | 1996-12-29 | Maison des Sports, Clermont-Ferrand, France | |
| 33 | Win | 33–0 | Boris Sinitsin | TKO | 7 (12) | 1996-11-02 | Palais Marcel Cerdan, Levallois-Perret, France | Won vacant European super-featherweight title |
| 32 | Win | 32–0 | Ángel Aldama | TKO | 1 (6) | 1996-08-21 | La Palestre, Le Cannet, France | |
| 31 | Win | 31–0 | Noé Hernández | TKO | 1 (?) | 1996-05-17 | Glen Stock Arena, Monroe, Michigan, U.S. | |
| 30 | Win | 30–0 | Jose Nino Diaz | KO | 2 (?) | 1996-04-12 | Atlantis Casino, Cupecoy Bay, Sint Maarten | |
| 29 | Win | 29–0 | Manuel Calvo | PTS | 10 (10) | 1996-03-10 | Paris, France | |
| 28 | Win | 28–0 | Juan Polo Pérez | PTS | 8 (8) | 1996-02-03 | Palais Marcel Cerdan, Levallois-Perret, France | |
| 27 | Win | 27–0 | Senturk Ozdemir | KO | 2 (?) | 1996-01-06 | Palais Marcel Cerdan, Levallois-Perret, France | |
| 26 | Win | 26–0 | Mark Smith | TKO | 3 (6) | 1995-11-04 | Caesars Palace, Paradise, Nevada, U.S. | |
| 25 | Win | 25–0 | Gustavo Rodolfo Sayaavedra | PTS | 8 (8) | 1995-10-21 | Polideportivo Delmi, Salta, Argentina | |
| 24 | Win | 24–0 | José Sanabria | PTS | 8 (8) | 1995-08-23 | La Palestre, Le Cannet, France | |
| 23 | Win | 23–0 | Bamana Dibateza | PTS | 8 (8) | 1995-07-02 | Point Theatre, Dublin, Ireland | |
| 22 | Win | 22–0 | Fernando Martinez | KO | 3 (?) | 1995-05-13 | Coliseo Rubén Rodríguez, Bayamón, Puerto Rico | |
| 21 | Win | 21–0 | Chris Clarkson | KO | 1 (8) | 1995-04-28 | Arena Randers, Randers, Denmark | |
| 20 | Win | 20–0 | Harry Escott | KO | 1 (8) | 1995-04-01 | Levallois-Perret, France | |
| 19 | Win | 19–0 | Tommy Barnes | TKO | 1 (8) | 1995-03-04 | Boardwalk Hall, Atlantic City, New Jersey, U.S. | |
| 18 | Win | 18–0 | Jean Marc Cammalieri | TKO | 5 (8) | 1995-02-04 | Palais des Sports, Castelnau-le-Lez, France | |
| 17 | Win | 17–0 | Didier Schaeffer | UD | 10 (10) | 1995-01-14 | Le Havre, France | |
| 16 | Win | 16–0 | Victor Adrian Britos | KO | 2 (?) | 1994-12-03 | Polideportivo Delmi, Salta, Argentina | |
| 15 | Win | 15–0 | Affif Djelti | PTS | 10 (10) | 1994-11-19 | Saint-Quentin, France | |
| 14 | Win | 14–0 | Marcelo Rodriguez | KO | 4 (?) | 1994-08-21 | Jai Alai, Saint-Jean-de-Luz, France | |
| 13 | Win | 13–0 | Kalman Varadi | PTS | 6 (6) | 1994-06-04 | Palais Marcel Cerdan, Levallois-Perret, France | |
| 12 | Win | 12–0 | Farid Benredjeb | PTS | 6 (6) | 1994-05-07 | Levallois-Perret, France | |
| 11 | Win | 11–0 | Pascal Ragaut | KO | 2 (?) | 1994-03-25 | Bresles, France | |
| 10 | Win | 10–0 | Orlando Otero | KO | 1 (?) | 1994-03-05 | Palais des Sports de Gerland, Lyon, France | |
| 9 | Win | 9–0 | Hocine Hassani | KO | 4 (6) | 1993-12-17 | Bresles, France | |
| 8 | Win | 8–0 | Phil Found | PTS | 6 (6) | 1993-10-16 | Palais Marcel Cerdan, Levallois-Perret, France | |
| 7 | Win | 7–0 | Bennadi Aarab | TKO | 1 (?) | 1993-05-22 | Elbeuf, France | |
| 6 | Win | 6–0 | Christian Iber | KO | 2 (6) | 1993-04-03 | Palais Marcel Cerdan, Levallois-Perret, France | |
| 5 | Win | 5–0 | Loic Pograjec | KO | 1 (?) | 1993-02-13 | Saint-Étienne, France | |
| 4 | Win | 4–0 | Thierry Loersch | KO | 1 (?) | 1993-01-31 | Levallois-Perret, France | |
| 3 | Win | 3–0 | Jean Michel Moulun | PTS | 6 (6) | 1992-11-29 | Dijon, France | |
| 2 | Win | 2–0 | Georges Roeder | KO | 2 (6) | 1992-10-16 | Stade Pierre de Coubertin, Paris, France | |
| 1 | Win | 1–0 | Francis Merle | KO | 3 (6) | 1991-05-25 | Brest, France | |

== See also ==
- List of world lightweight boxing champions

Sporting positions
Regional boxing titles
| Vacant Title last held by Anatoly Alexandrov | European super-featherweight champion November 2, 1996 – 1997; Vacated | Vacant Title next held by Djamel Lifa |
| Preceded by Oscar Garcia Cano | European lightweight champion January 31, 2000 – 2001; Vacated | Vacant Title next held by Stefano Zoff |
| Vacant Title last held by Sandro Casamonica | WBA Inter-Continental lightweight champion November 29, 2002 – 2003; Vacated | Vacant Title next held by Pedro Miranda |
World boxing titles
| Preceded by Jean Baptiste Mendy | WBA lightweight champion April 10, 1999 – August 7, 1999 | Succeeded by Stefano Zoff |
| Preceded by Takanori Hatakeyama | WBA lightweight champion July 1, 2001 – October 8, 2001 | Succeeded by Raúl Horacio Balbi |
