= David Tetteh (boxer) =

Ghanaian boxer

Personal information
- Nickname: Little Tyson
- Nationality: Ghanaian
- Born: David Odoi Tetteh; 5 July 1971 (age 55) Accra, Ghana
- Weight: light/light welter/welterweight

Boxing career
- Stance: Orthodox

Boxing record
- Total fights: 22
- Wins: 20 (KO 15)
- Losses: 4 (KO 0)

David "Little Tyson" Tetteh (born 5 July 1971 in Accra) is a Ghanaian professional light/light welter/welterweight boxer of the 1990s and 2000s who won the Ghanaian lightweight title, African Boxing Union lightweight title, and Commonwealth lightweight title, and was a challenger for the World Boxing Organization (WBO) North American Boxing Organization (NABO) lightweight title against Harold Warren, his professional fighting weight varied from 134 lb (61 kg; 9 st 8 lb), i.e. lightweight to 143 3/4 lb (65.2 kg; 10 st 3.8 lb), i.e. welterweight.

== Professional boxing record ==
22 fights	20 wins	2 losses
By knockout	15	0
By decision	5	2

No.	Result	Record	Opponent	Type	Round, time	Date	Location	Notes
22	Win	20–2	(Argentina) Victor Hugo Paz	KO	4 (10), 0:45	2000-04-06	Air Canada Centre, Toronto, Ontario, Canada	
21	Win	19–2	(Trinidad and Tobago) Joseph Charles	UD	6	1999-09-10	(United States) Harrah's Gulf Coast, Biloxi, Mississippi, USA	
20	Win	18–2	(Puerto Rico) Elvin Peluyera	TKO	5 (6)	1999-06-18	(United States Virgin Islands) Saint Thomas, U.S. Virgin Islands	
19	Loss	17–2	(United States) Harold Warren	SD	12	1999-06-04	(United States) Harrah's Gulf Coast, Biloxi, Mississippi, USA	For WBO-NABO lightweight title.
18	Win	17–1	(Ghana) Ossie Duran	PTS	12	1998-06-06	Accra, Ghana	Retained Commonwealth (British Empire) lightweight title.
17	Win	16–1	(Canada) Billy Wright	UD	12	1997-03-04	Airport Hilton Hotel, Toronto, Ontario, Canada	Won Commonwealth (British Empire) lightweight title.
16	Loss	15–1	(Canada) Billy Wright	MD	12	1996-10-11	International Plaza Hotel, Toronto, Ontario, Canada	Lost Commonwealth (British Empire) lightweight title.
15	Win	15–0	(Spain) Óscar Palomino	PTS	8	1996-09-07	Stadthalle, Cottbus, Brandenburg, Germany	
14	Win	14–0	(Togo) Dick Dosseh	KO	2 (8)	1996-07-27	Accra, Ghana	
13	Win	13–0	(United Kingdom) Billy Schwer	TKO	12 (12)	1995-11-25	(United Kingdom) Goresbrook Leisure Centre, Dagenham, London, England	Won Commonwealth (British Empire) lightweight title.
12	Win	12–0	(Ghana) Tunde Tyler	TKO	3 (?)	1995-11-11	Accra, Ghana	
11	Win	11–0	(Ghana) Isaac Nyaku	KO	4 (12)	1995-05-27	Accra, Ghana	Retained Ghanaian lightweight title.
10	Win	10–0	(Tanzania) Ali Mohammed	KO	2 (6)	1995-05-06	Sports Complex, Accra, Ghana	
9	Win	9–0	(Ghana) Douglas Odame	KO	4 (12)	1993-12-04	Lusaka, Zambia	Won vacant African lightweight title
8	Win	8–0	(Ghana) Awel Abdulai	PTS	12	1993-09-23	Accra, Ghana	Won Ghanaian lightweight title.
7	Win	7–0	(Ghana) Hammond Kotey	KO	4 (?)	1993-08-05	Accra, Ghana	
6	Win	6–0	(Ghana) Young Atenga	KO	2 (?)	1993-07-03	Kaneshie Sports Complex, Accra, Ghana	
5	Win	5–0	(Ghana) Joseph Lartey	KO	4 (?)	1993-05-29	Accra, Ghana	
4	Win	4–0	(Ghana) Sammy Adjei	KO	6 (?)	1993-05-01	Accra, Ghana	
3	Win	3–0	(Ghana) Marciano Commey	KO	1 (?)	1993-04-10	Accra, Ghana	
2	Win	2–0	(Ghana) Issah Kabako	KO	4 (?)	1993-03-09	Accra, Ghana	
1	Win	1–0	(Ghana) Joe Ketenga	KO	1 (?)	1993-01-09	Accra, Ghana	Professional debut.
