= Hong Sung-sik =

Korean male boxer

Olympic medal record

Men's boxing

Representing South Korea
| Bronze medal – third place | 1992 Barcelona | Lightweight |

- Hong Sung-sik
- Hangul: 홍성식
- Hanja: 洪性湜
- RR: Hong Seongsik
- MR: Hong Sŏngsik

Hong Sung-sik (Korean: 홍성식; born November 13, 1967, in Gochang, Jeollabuk-do) is a retired South Korean amateur boxer.

== Career ==
Hong won a bronze medal in the men's Lightweight (60 kg) category at the 1992 Summer Olympics in Barcelona. He defeated future WBO lightweight champion Artur Grigorian 9–3 in Round of 16, but was edged out 11–10 by Oscar De La Hoya in the semifinal bout.

Hong retired from boxing after winning gold at the 1993 East Asian Games. He is currently serving as a junior high school physical education teacher in Gochang, Jeollabuk-do.

== Results ==
1990 Boxing World Cup

| Event | Round | Result | Opponent | Score |
|---|---|---|---|---|
| Lightweight | First | Win | (Hungary) Laszlo Szuecs | 19-11 |
| Lightweight | Quarterfinal | Win | (Soviet Union) Bakyt Amanbayev | 13-11 |
| Lightweight | Semifinal | Loss | (Cuba) Julio Gonzalez | RSC 1 |
| Lightweight | 3rd Place | Win | (Morocco) Kamel Marjouane | pts |

1992 Summer Olympics

| Event | Round | Result | Opponent | Score |
|---|---|---|---|---|
| Lightweight | First | Win | (North Korea) Yun Yong-chol | 11-2 |
| Lightweight | Second | Win | (Soviet Union) Artur Grigorian | 9-3 |
| Lightweight | Quarterfinal | Win | (Philippines) Ronald Chavez | KO 1 |
| Lightweight | Semifinal | Loss | (United States) Oscar De La Hoya | 10-11 |
