= Takanori Hatakeyama =

Japanese boxer (born 1975)

Personal information
- Born: 畑山隆則; July 28, 1975 (age 51) Aomori, Japan
- Height: 5 ft 8 in (173 cm)
- Weight: Super-featherweight; Lightweight

Boxing career
- Stance: Orthodox

Boxing record
- Total fights: 29
- Wins: 24
- Win by KO: 19
- Losses: 2
- Draws: 3

Takanori Hatakeyama (畑山隆則, Hatakeyama Takanori; born July 28, 1975) is a Japanese former professional boxer who competed from 1993 to 2001. He is a world champion in two weight classes, having held the World Boxing Association (WBA) super-featherweight title from 1998 to 1999 and the WBA lightweight title from 2000 and 2001.

== Personal life ==
Hatakeyama played baseball throughout his childhood, wanting to become a professional baseball player when he grew up. However, a boxing match he saw on television made him take an interest in boxing. He decided to become a professional boxer after seeing Joichiro Tatsuyoshi win the WBC bantamweight title. He quit high school, moving to Tokyo to begin serious training.

== Professional career ==
He made his professional debut at age 17 in June 1993, without a single fight as an amateur. He won the OPBF Super Featherweight title in 1996, and challenged the WBA Super Featherweight champion Yong-Soo Choi in 1997. The fight was a close draw, and Choi retained his title.

Hatakeyama challenged the Japanese super-featherweight champion in March 1998, winning by 9th-round TKO. He immediately returned his title to prepare for another world title match. He fought Yong-Soo Choi again for the WBA title on September 5, 1998, this time winning by decision to gain his first world title.

Hatakeyama made his first defense with a draw, but lost his second defense match against the mandatory challenger Lakva Sim in 1999. He announced his retirement after the fight, but resumed training in 2000, moving up to the lightweight division.

Hatakeyama's first fight after returning from retirement was a world title match, fighting Gilberto Serrano for the WBA lightweight title on June 11, 2000. He won by technical knockout in the 8th round, becoming the fourth Japanese boxer to have captured world titles in two different weight classes. Hatakeyama chose fellow Japanese boxer Hiroyuki Sakamoto to challenge his title, and the two fought an epic fight in October, 2000. Hatakeyama win Sakamoto by TKO in the 10th round, making his first defense.

In February, 2001, he fought American born fighter Rick Yoshimura, who had defended the Japanese lightweight title 22 consecutive times. Hatakeyama managed to keep his title with a draw, but Yoshimura would have won the fight if he had not lost a point for a foul. In July, 2001, he fought former lightweight champion and mandatory challenger Julien Lorcy for his third defense. Hatakeyama pushed Lorcy against the ropes several times, but was pummeled repeatedly by Lorcy, and lost the fight by decision. Hatakeyama officially retired after the fight at the young age of 25. His record was 24-2-3 (19 KO).

== Professional boxing record ==
29 fights	24 wins	2 losses
By knockout	19	1
By decision	5	1
Draws	3	

No.	Result	Record	Opponent	Type	Round, time	Date	Location	Notes
29	Loss	24–2–3	Julien Lorcy	UD	12	Jul 1, 2001	Super Arena, Saitama, Japan	Lost WBA lightweight title
28	Draw	24–1–3	Rick Yoshimura	SD	12	Feb 17, 2001	Kokugikan, Tokyo, Japan	Retained WBA lightweight title
27	Win	24–1–2	Hiroyuki Sakamoto	KO	10 (12)	Oct 11, 2000	Arena, Yokohama, Japan	Retained WBA lightweight title
26	Win	23–1–2	Gilberto Serrano	TKO	8 (12)	Jun 11, 2000	Ariake Coliseum, Tokyo, Japan	Won WBA lightweight title
25	Loss	22–1–2	Lakva Sim	TKO	5 (12)	Jun 27, 1999	Ariake Coliseum, Tokyo, Japan	Lost WBA super-featherweight title
24	Draw	22–0–2	Saul Duran	SD	12	Feb 13, 1999	Ariake Coliseum, Tokyo, Japan	Retained WBA super-featherweight title
23	Win	22–0–1	Choi Yong-soo	MD	12	Sep 5, 1998	Kokugikan, Tokyo, Japan	Won WBA super-featherweight title
22	Win	21–0–1	Koji Arisawa	TKO	9 (10)	Mar 29, 1998	Kokugikan, Tokyo, Japan	Won Japanese super-featherweight title
21	Draw	20–0–1	Choi Yong-soo	SD	12	Oct 5, 1997	Kokugikan, Tokyo, Japan	For WBA super-featherweight title
20	Win	20–0	Jorge Luis Lopez	PTS	10	May 19, 1997	Japan	
19	Win	19–0	Dong Chul Yoon	TKO	4 (12)	Feb 17, 1997	Korakuen Hall, Tokyo, Japan	Retained OPBF super featherweight title
18	Win	18–0	Okky Abi Bakrin	KO	9 (12)	Sep 21, 1996	Kawasaki, Japan	Retained OPBF super-featherweight title
17	Win	17–0	Rudy Cabiles	PTS	12	Jun 19, 1996	Yokohama, Japan	Retained OPBF super-featherweight title
16	Win	16–0	Jung-Chil Choi	KO	2 (12)	Mar 18, 1996	Japan	Won vacant OPBF super-featherweight title
15	Win	15–0	Bert Navarez	KO	4 (10)	Dec 12, 1995	Japan	
14	Win	14–0	Flash Pena	TKO	6 (10)	Oct 16, 1995	Japan	
13	Win	13–0	Jae Woon Park	KO	2 (10)	Jul 17, 1995	Japan	
12	Win	12–0	Jun Ignasio Mataganas	KO	2 (10)	May 15, 1995	Korakuen Hall, Tokyo, Japan	
11	Win	11–0	ByungSoo Moon	TKO	3 (10)	Feb 20, 1995	Japan	
10	Win	10–0	Hyun Woo Pyo	KO	3 (10)	Nov 21, 1994	Korakuen Hall, Tokyo, Japan	
9	Win	9–0	Masaaki Horiguchi	TKO	4 (10)	Sep 19, 1994	Japan	
8	Win	8–0	Hee-Chul Yang	KO	3 (8)	Jun 20, 1994	Japan	
7	Win	7–0	Shigeru Kotani	KO	3 (6)	Feb 13, 1994	Prefectural Gymnasium, Osaka, Japan	
6	Win	6–0	Kazunori Sakamoto	TKO	1 (6)	Dec 18, 1993	Japan	
5	Win	5–0	Kenji Ichikawa	PTS	4	Nov 4, 1993	Korakuen Hall, Tokyo, Japan	
4	Win	4–0	Shinya Ueda	PTS	4	Oct 4, 1993	Korakuen Hall, Tokyo, Japan	
3	Win	3–0	Tomoaki Sakayori	TKO	4 (4)	Sep 2, 1993	Japan	
2	Win	2–0	Hiroshi Kawata	KO	1 (4)	Aug 4, 1993	Japan	
1	Win	1–0	Kazuhiro Fukumura	KO	1 (4)	Jun 17, 1993	Japan	

== Titles in boxing ==
=== Major world titles ===
- WBA super-featherweight champion (130 lbs)
- WBA lightweight champion (135 lbs)

=== Regional/International titles ===
- Japanese super-featherweight champion (130 lbs)
- OPBF super-featherweight champion (130 lbs)

== Post-retirement ==
Hatakeyama has succeeded in several careers after retiring from boxing. He opened an amateur boxing gym with former WBA Middleweight champion Shinji Takehara, and occasionally appears on television shows. He works as a special staff member for a boxing and fitness gym in Kyoto, personally teaching classes once or twice a month. He married announcer Kumiko Kiyohara on June 17, 2006, and his first son was born in September of the same year. Hatakeyama has another son, born with his former wife in 1996. He also appears as a commentator for K-1 WORLD MAX events. He is known to be an avid fan of the Rakuten Eagles baseball team, and attended Aomori University in 2007 to obtain a bachelor's degree.

== See also ==
- Boxing in Japan
- List of Japanese boxing world champions
- List of world super-featherweight boxing champions
- List of world lightweight boxing champions

Sporting positions
Regional boxing titles
Vacant Title last held by Yamato Mitani	OPBF super-featherweight champion March 18, 1996 – 1997; Vacated	Vacant Title next held by Yamato Mitani
Preceded by Koji Arisawa	Japanese super-featherweight champion March 29, 1998 – 1998; Vacated	Vacant Title next held by Ryuhei Sugita
World boxing titles
Preceded by Choi Yong-soo	WBA super-featherweight champion September 5, 1998 – June 27, 1999	Succeeded by Lakva Sim
Preceded by Gilberto Serrano	WBA lightweight champion June 11, 2000 – July 1, 2001	Succeeded by Julien Lorcy
