= Moses Odion =

Nigerian boxer

Personal information
- Nationality: Nigerian
- Born: 10 June 1972 (age 52)

Sport
- Sport: Boxing

Moses Odion (born 10 June 1972) is a Nigerian boxer. He competed in the men's lightweight event at the 1992 Summer Olympics.
