= Artur Grigorian =

Uzbekistani boxer

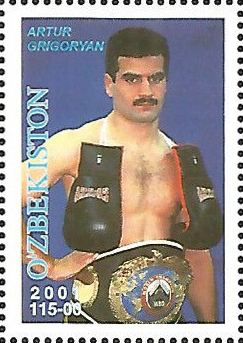
- Grigorian on a 2001 stamp of Uzbekistan

Personal information
- Nickname: King Artur
- Nationality: Soviet → Uzbek
- Born: Artur Razmikovich Grigoryan; 20 October 1967 (age 58) Tashkent, Uzbek SSR, Soviet Union
- Height: 5 ft 7 1/2 in (1.71 m)
- Weight: Lightweight

Boxing career
- Reach: 69 in (175 cm)
- Stance: Southpaw

Boxing record
- Total fights: 39
- Wins: 38
- Win by KO: 23
- Losses: 1
- Draws: 0
- No contests: 0
Medal record
Men's amateur boxing
Representing the Soviet Union
World Amateur Championships
Silver medal – second place	1991 Australia	-60 kg
Goodwill Games
Gold medal – first place	1990 Seattle	-60 kg

Artur Razmikovich Grigorian (Armenian: Արթուր Գրիգորյան; born 20 October 1967) is a retired Armenian-Uzbek professional boxer.

Grigorian is a former WBO lightweight champion. He defended his title against record-breaking 17 boxers, and held it for seven years, six months and twenty days; nearly as long as record holder Benny Leonard held his lightweight title (7 years, 8 months).

== Biography ==
Grigorian was born on 20 October 1967 in Soviet Tashkent, Uzbek SSR to an Armenian family from Nagorno-Karabakh. He has a brother and sister.

== Amateur career ==
Grigorian began boxing at the age of 11. He defeated Shane Mosley and won a gold medal at the 1990 Goodwill Games in Seattle City. Grigorian won a silver medal at the 1991 World Amateur Boxing Championships and competed at the 1992 Summer Olympics in Barcelona.

- 1991 2nd place as a lightweight at the World Championships in Sydney, Australia. His results were:
  - Defeated Juan Carlos Saiz (Spain) PTS (26–18)
  - Defeated Julio Gonzalez (Cuba) PTS (15–12)
  - Defeated Hong Sung-Sik (South Korea) PTS (19–7)
  - Defeated Justin Rowsell (Australia) PTS (21–15)
  - Lost to Marco Rudolph (Germany) PTS (14–19)
- 1992 Grigorian represented the Unified Team (Former Soviet Union) at the Barcelona Olympic Games as a lightweight. His results were:
  - Defeated Óscar Palomino (Spain) 11–10
  - Lost to Hong Sung-Sik (South Korea) 3–9

Artur had a final amateur record of 361–23.

== Professional career ==
Trained by Fritz Sdunek, Grigorian began his professional career in 1994 and won eight consecutive bouts. On 23 July 1994, Grigorian defeated Turkish boxer Senturk Ozdemir by a fifth-round technical knockout and won the vacant German International lightweight title.

On 1 April 1995, Grigorian defeated Antonio Strabello and became the WBO Inter-Continental champion. After six non-title bouts and one title defense, Artur, with a perfect 19–0 record, became eligible to fight for the WBO lightweight championship world title. The title had recently been vacated by Oscar De La Hoya after he moved up to the light welterweight division.

Grigorian faced Puerto Rican Antonio Rivera on 13 April 1996, for the vacant WBO lightweight title. Both were the two top contenders in the lightweight division. Artur won by knocking Rivera out in the twelfth round and became the new WBO lightweight champion.

After four title defenses, Grigorian defended his belt against undefeated challenger Marco Rudolph. Rudolph had bested Grigorian seven years earlier at the 1991 World Amateur Boxing Championship finals. Grigorian avenged his amateur defeat by stopping Rudolph in the sixth round.

Grigorian would continue to defend his title a total of seventeen times, a new record in the lightweight division. Artur was just one more defense away from becoming the longest reigning lightweight champion, but ultimately lost his belt to Acelino Freitas by unanimous decision on 3 January 2004. Grigorian had surgery on his right shoulder prior to the bout. Freitas lost the belt in his first title defense against Diego Corrales. Grigorian retired later that year after winning one more bout.

On 24 February 2009, at the age of 41, Artur came out of retirement for one more bout in which he won a six-round unanimous decision against Bulgarian Kirkor Kirkorov. Kirkorov is also of Armenian descent and also a 1991 World Amateur Boxing Championships medalist.

== Personal life ==
Grigorian lives in Germany with his wife and three daughters. He currently works as a boxing trainer.

== Professional boxing record ==
39 fights	38 wins	1 loss
By knockout	23	0
By decision	15	1

No.	Result	Record	Opponent	Type	Round, time	Date	Location	Notes
39	Win	38–1	(Bulgaria) Kirkor Kirkorov	PTS	6	24 Feb 2009	Universum Gym, Wandsbek, Hamburg, Germany	
38	Win	37–1	(Romania) Vasile Herteg	TKO	4 (8), 2:35	11 Sep 2004	Kisstadion, Budapest, Hungary	
37	Loss	36–1	(Brazil) Acelino Freitas	UD	12	3 Jan 2004	Foxwoods Resort, Mashantucket, Connecticut, United States	Lost WBO lightweight title
36	Win	36–0	(Poland) Matt Zegan	MD	12	18 Jan 2003	Grugahalle, Essen, Nordrhein-Westfalen, Germany	Retained WBO lightweight title
35	Win	35–0	(Italy) Stefano Zoff	UD	12	14 Sep 2002	Volkswagenhalle, Braunschweig, Niedersachsen, Germany	Retained WBO lightweight title
34	Win	34–0	(Mexico) Rocky Martinez	TKO	8 (12), 2:15	5 Jan 2002	Bordelandhalle, Magdeburg, Sachsen-Anhalt, Germany	Retained WBO lightweight title
33	Win	33–0	(Argentina) Aldo Nazareno Rios	UD	12	16 Jun 2001	Kisstadion, Budapest, Hungary	Retained WBO lightweight title
32	Win	32–0	(Spain) Angel Jose Perez	TKO	6 (12), 1:40	24 Feb 2001	Sporthalle, Alsterdorf, Hamburg, Germany	Retained WBO lightweight title
31	Win	31–0	(Colombia) Antonio Pitalua	UD	12	25 Nov 2000	Preussag Arena, Hannover, Niedersachsen, Germany	Retained WBO lightweight title
30	Win	30–0	(Hungary) Zoltan Kalocsai	TKO	12 (12), 1:00	23 Jun 2000	FTC Stadium, Budapest, Hungary	Retained WBO lightweight title
29	Win	29–0	(Italy) Sandro Casamonica	TKO	9 (12), 1:48	19 Feb 2000	Estrel Convention Center, Neukölln, Berlin, Germany	Retained WBO lightweight title
28	Win	28–0	(Uruguay) Wilson Enrique Galli	TKO	10 (12), 2:46	27 Nov 1999	Hansehalle, Lübeck, Schleswig-Holstein, Germany	Retained WBO lightweight title
27	Win	27–0	(United States) Michael Clark	KO	5 (12), 1:45	9 Oct 1999	Koenig Pilsener Arena, Oberhausen, Nordrhein-Westfalen, Germany	Retained WBO lightweight title
26	Win	26–0	(Spain) Oscar Garcia Cano	UD	12	13 Mar 1999	Hansehalle, Lübeck, Schleswig-Holstein, Germany	Retained WBO lightweight title
25	Win	25–0	(Italy) Giorgio Campanella	TKO	10 (12), 1:36	24 Oct 1998	Sporthalle, Alsterdorf, Hamburg, Germany	Retained WBO lightweight title
24	Win	24–0	(Germany) Marco Rudolph	TKO	6 (12), 1:50	14 Mar 1998	Sporthalle, Wandsbek, Hamburg, Germany	Retained WBO lightweight title
23	Win	23–0	(United States) David Armstrong	UD	12	11 Oct 1997	Stadthalle, Cottbus, Brandenburg, Germany	Retained WBO lightweight title
22	Win	22–0	(Argentina) Raul Horacio Balbi	TKO	11 (12), 1:10	22 Feb 1997	Sporthalle, Wandsbek, Hamburg, Germany	Retained WBO lightweight title
21	Win	21–0	(United States) Marty Jakubowski	UD	12	16 Nov 1996	Sporthalle, Wandsbek, Hamburg, Germany	Retained WBO lightweight title
20	Win	20–0	(United States) Gene Reed	KO	2 (12), 1:25	21 Sep 1996	Sport und Erholungszentrum, Friedrichshain, Berlin, Germany	Retained WBO lightweight title
19	Win	19–0	(Puerto Rico) Antonio Rivera	KO	12 (12), 2:23	13 Apr 1996	Sporthalle, Wandsbek, Hamburg, Germany	Won vacant WBO lightweight title
18	Win	18–0	(Colombia) Esteban Perez Quinones	TKO	6	2 Oct 1996	Stadthalle, Cottbus, Brandenburg, Germany	
17	Win	17–0	(Zambia) Paul Kaoma	PTS	8	2 Dec 1995	Carl Benz Halle, Karlsruhe, Baden-Württemberg, Germany	
16	Win	16–0	(Belgium) Jean-Marc Camaleri	TKO	2 (8)	7 Oct 1995	Festhalle, Frankfurt, Hessen, Germany	
15	Win	15–0	(France) Pascal Ragaut	TKO	4 (8)	23 Sep 1995	Saaltheater Geulen, Aachen, Nordrhein-Westfalen, Germany	
14	Win	14–0	(Mexico) Angel Aldama	TKO	5 (12)	19 Aug 1995	Eisstadion, Düsseldorf, Nordrhein-Westfalen, Germany	Retained WBO Inter-Continental lightweight title
13	Win	13–0	(Spain) Carlos Pena	PTS	8	10 Jun 1995	Europahalle, Karlsruhe, Baden-Württemberg, Germany	
12	Win	12–0	(United States) Mark Smith	PTS	4	20 May 1995	Sporthalle, Alsterdorf, Hamburg, Germany	
11	Win	11–0	(Germany) Antonio Strabello	TKO	8 (12), 1:52	1 Apr 1995	Saaltheater Geulen, Aachen, Nordrhein-Westfalen, Germany	Won vacant WBO Inter-Continental lightweight title
10	Win	10–0	(Dominican Republic) Armando Juan Reyes	TKO	4 (8)	11 Mar 1995	Deutz Sporthalle, Cologne, Nordrhein-Westfalen, Germany	
9	Win	9–0	(United States) Bobby Brewer	TD	4 (4)	28 Jan 1995	Sporthalle, Schoeneberg, Berlin, Germany	
8	Win	8–0	(Dominican Republic) Benito Martinez	TKO	5	17 Dec 1994	Sporthalle, Alsterdorf, Hamburg, Germany	
7	Win	7–0	(Spain) Jose Carlos Cantero	TKO	5	3 Dec 1994	Atelier Bruno Bruni, Hamburg, Germany	
6	Win	6–0	(Puerto Rico) Alberto Alicea	TKO	5	22 Oct 1994	Hansehalle, Lübeck, Schleswig-Holstein, Germany	
5	Win	5–0	(Spain) Oscar Palomino	PTS	8	10 Sep 1994	Sporthalle, Alsterdorf, Hamburg, Germany	
4	Win	4–0	(Turkey) Senturk Ozdemir	TKO	5 (10)	23 Jul 1994	Sportforum, Lichtenberg, Berlin, Germany	Won vacant German International lightweight title
3	Win	3–0	(Belgium) Pascal Montulet	PTS	8	28 May 1994	Tivoli Eissporthalle, Aachen, Nordrhein-Westfalen, Germany	
2	Win	2–0	(Mexico) Marcelo Rodriguez	PTS	8	23 Apr 1994	Sporthalle Bildungszentrum, Halle, Sachsen-Anhalt, Germany	
1	Win	1–0	(United States) Juan Tubbs	TKO	2	10 Apr 1994	Universum Gym, Wandsbek, Hamburg, Germany	

== See also ==
- List of WBO world champions
- List of lightweight boxing champions

Achievements
Regional boxing titles
New title	WBO Inter-Continental lightweight champion 1 April 1995 – 13 April 1996; Won world title	Vacant Title next held by Justin Rowsell
World boxing titles
Preceded by Oscar De La Hoya; Vacated	WBO lightweight champion 13 April 1996 – 3 January 2004	Succeeded by Acelino Freitas
