= Dombóvár =

- Town
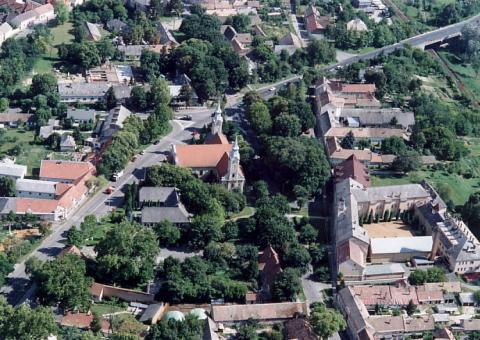
- Aerial view of Dombóvár

- Flag Coat of arms

- Location of Tolna county in Hungary

- Location of Dombóvár
- Coordinates: 46.38196°N 18.14217°E
- Country: Hungary
- County: Tolna
- District: Dombóvár

Area
  - Total: 78.48 km^{2} (30.30 sq mi)

Population (2004)
  - Total: 17,041 (1 Jan. 2,024)
  - Density: 263.18/km^{2} (681.6/sq mi)
- Time zone: UTC+1 (CET)
  - Summer (DST): UTC+2 (CEST)
- Postal code: 7200
- Area code: (+36) 74
- Website: www.dombovar.hu

Dombóvár (Hungarian pronunciation: [ˈdomboːvaːr]; German: Dombowar; Croatian: Dombuvar) is a town in Tolna County, Hungary. It is the third largest settlement in Tolna County after Szekszárd (the county seat) and Paks.

Archeologic excavations show that the Dombóvár area has been continuously populated since the Stone Age. During the Roman rule over Pannonia around 8 AD it was known as Pons Sociorum Mansuectina (Kapos River Crossing) because of the bridge that was built there. After the Roman withdrawal from the area, it was populated by the Slavs, who named the settlement after oak trees (dobov(o) in proto-Slavic).

In 1715, the settlement was granted market town status. After 1871, with the reorganization of the public administration and the establishment of civil administration, the market town status was permanently abolished, and Dombóvár officially became a large village, although the locals kept referring to it as a town. On April 1, 1970 the Hungarian government officially elevated Dombóvár to the status of a town.

== Twin towns – sister cities ==
Dombóvár is twinned with:

- Kernen im Remstal, Germany
- Ogulin, Croatia
- Vir, Croatia
- Höganäs, Sweden

== Notable people ==
- Ján Golian (1906–1945), Slovak Brigadier General and one of the most important figures of the Slovak National Uprising
- Zoltán Tildy, Jr. (1917–1994), photographer
- János Petrovics (1971–2024), boxer

== Gallery ==
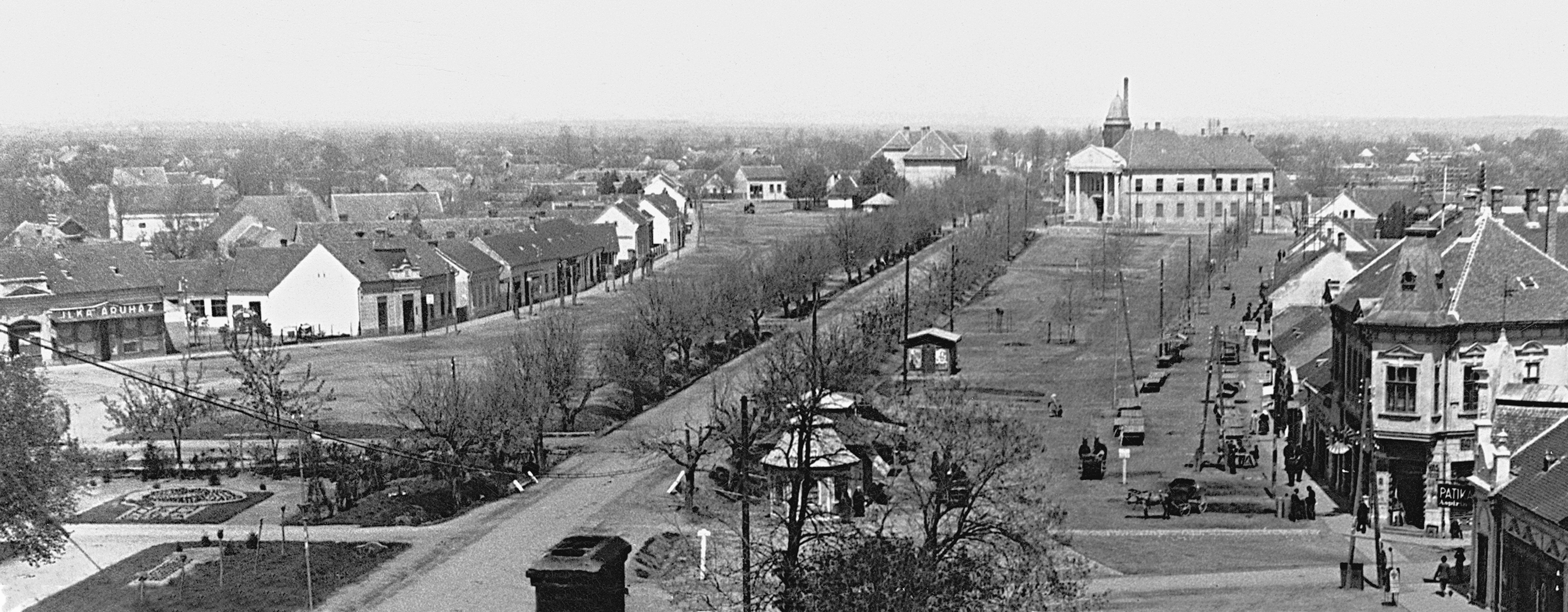
Dombóvár in 1935

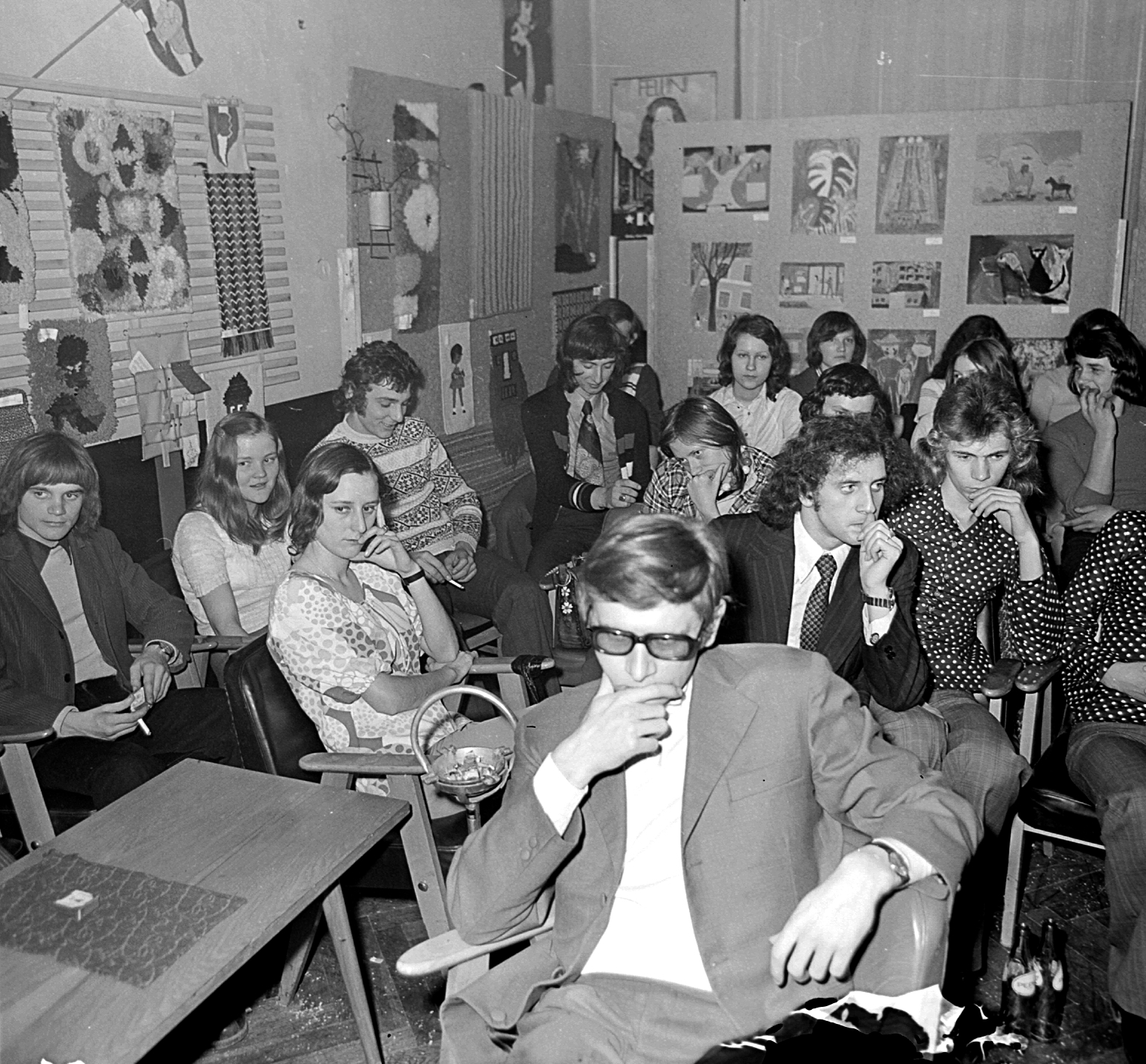
Students in Dombóvár, 1975

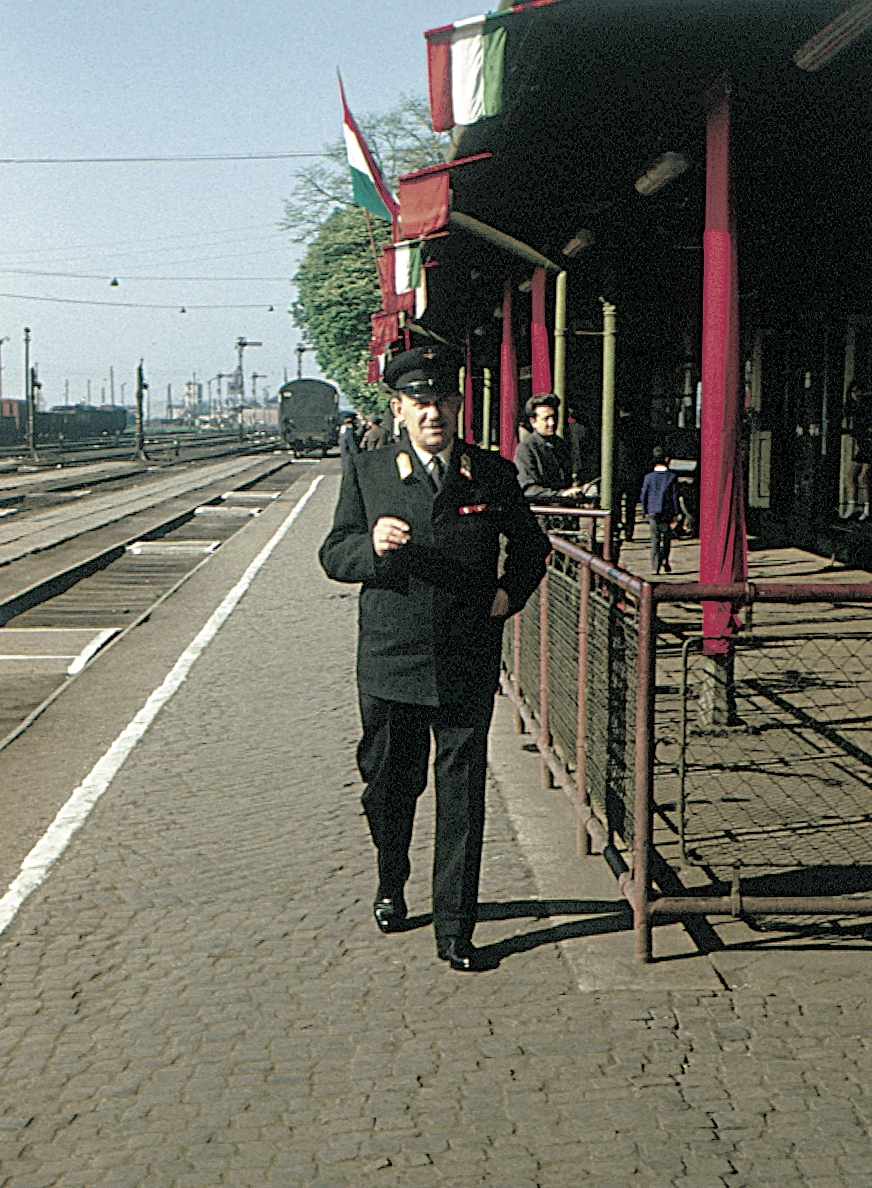
Dombóvár's railway station, 1973
