= Alan Vaughan =

British boxer (born 1972)

Personal information
- Full name: Alan Andrew Vaughan
- Nationality: British
- Born: 18 June 1972 (age 52); Huyton, England

Sport
- Sport: Boxing

Alan Andrew Vaughan (born 18 June 1972) is a British boxer. He competed in the men's lightweight event at the 1992 Summer Olympics.

Vaughan won the 1995 Amateur Boxing Association British light-welterweight title, when boxing out of the Huyton ABC.
