= Raúl Horacio Balbi =

Argentine boxer

Personal information
- Nickname: Pepe
- Born: October 7, 1973 (age 52) Moreno, Buenos Aires, Argentina
- Height: 5 ft 7 in (170 cm)
- Weight: Lightweight; Light welterweight

Boxing career
- Reach: 67 in (170 cm)
- Stance: Orthodox

Boxing record
- Total fights: 68
- Wins: 55
- Win by KO: 38
- Losses: 11
- Draws: 2

Raúl Horacio Balbi (born October 7, 1973) is an Argentine former professional boxer.

== Professional career ==
Balbi made his professional debut on November 19, 1993, in Mercedes, Corrientes, Argentina. Balbi made a victorious start to his career by knocking out Juan Bautista Sosa in the first round. One of the highlights of Balbi's early career came on June 3, 1995, when he beat Simon Canache to claim the South American lightweight title. The first loss of Balbi's career came on September 9, 1995, when he lost to Manuel Alberto Billalba via a ten round points decision, Balbi avenged this defeat later on in his career by beating Billalba twice.

On February 22, 1997, Balbi travelled to Hamburg, Germany, to challenge the Uzbek champion Artur Grigorian for the WBO lightweight title. Balbi's challenge proved to be unsuccessful, as Grigorian scored an eleventh round technical knockout. After the fight Balbi returned to Argentina, where he put together a run of five wins before losing a split decision to Walter Hugo Rodriguez.

Balbi remained undefeated over his next sixteen bouts, earning him a chance to fight Alberto Esteban Sicurella in a WBA title eliminator. Balbi won the fight by tenth round technical knockout, which led to a world title challenge against the French champion Julien Lorcy on October 8, 2001, in Paris. In the third round of the contest Balbi was able to open a large cut above the champion's right eye and had further success when he knocked Lorcy down in the seventh. The fight lasted the twelve round distance and Balbi was announced as the winner via a majority decision.

The first defence of Balbi's title took place on January 5, 2002, against Leonard Dorin in San Antonio, Texas. After a toe-to-toe battle which lasted the full twelve rounds, the Romanian challenger Dorin was announced the winner by split decision. After the fight a surprised Balbi claimed that he was "robbed". A rematch occurred five months later, this time in Bucharest, Romania. On this occasion Dorin won a unanimous decision with scores of: 118-111, 117-112 and 118-110.

A run of six consecutive wins earned Balbi another shot at the WBA title, this time for the vacant light welterweight belt. The fight took place in Bolton, United Kingdom on September 2, 2006, against the Frenchman Souleymane M'baye. Balbi was knocked down twice en route to a fourth round loss via technical knockout, thus handing the title to M'baye. Since his light welterweight title challenge Balbi has lost three times including against Denis Shafikov. His most recent match, a draw against Bolivian boxer Franklin Mamani, took place on May 28, 2010.

== Professional boxing record ==
68 fights	55 wins	11 losses
By knockout	38	4
By decision	14	7
By disqualification	3	0
Draws	2	

No.	Result	Record	Opponent	Type	Round, time	Date	Location	Notes
68	Draw	55–11–2	Franklin Mamani	TD	3 (9)	2010–05–28	Coliseo Julio Borelli Viterito, La Paz, Bolivia	For vacant WBA Fedebol welterweight title
67	Loss	55–11–1	Guillermo de Jesus Paz	UD	6 (6)	2009–09–11	Polideportivo, Villa Domínico, Argentina	
66	Loss	55–10–1	Denis Shafikov	TD	6 (8)	2008–11–28	Hartwall Areena, Helsinki, Finland	
65	Loss	55–9–1	Ionuţ Dan Ion	KO	3 (10)	2008–04–19	Sala Polivalenta, Bucharest, Romania	For NABA light-welterweight title
64	Win	55–8–1	Diego Ponce	KO	2 (8)	2007–10–27	Ce.De.M. N° 2, Caseros, Argentina	
63	Loss	54–8–1	Souleymane M'baye	TKO	4 (12)	2006–09–02	Bolton Arena, Bolton, England, U.K.	For vacant WBA light-welterweight title
62	Win	54–7–1	Jorge Luis Noriega Medrano	TKO	2 (12)	2005–12–02	Estadio Luna Park, Buenos Aires, Argentina	Retained WBA Fedelatin light-welterweight title
61	Win	53–7–1	Walter Diaz	TKO	6 (10)	2005–10–07	Estadio Luna Park, Buenos Aires, Argentina	Retained WBA Fedelatin light-welterweight title
60	Win	52–7–1	Guillermo de Jesus Paz	UD	10 (10)	2005–09–03	Ce.De.M. N° 2, Caseros, Argentina	
59	Win	51–7–1	Carlos Donquiz	KO	5 (10)	2005–05–26	Estadio Luna Park, Buenos Aires, Argentina	Won vacant WBA Fedelatin light-welterweight title
58	Win	50–7–1	Carlos Adán Jerez	UD	10 (10)	2005–04–30	Estadio Aldo Cantoni, San Juan, Argentina	
57	Win	49–7–1	Norberto Acosta	KO	2 (8)	2005–03–12	Ce.De.M. N° 2, Caseros, Argentina	
56	Loss	48–7–1	Jose Rosa Gomez	KO	8 (10)	2003–03–08	Ce.De.M. N° 2, Caseros, Argentina	
55	Loss	48–6–1	Leonard Doroftei	UD	12 (12)	2002–05–31	Sala Polivalenta, Bucharest, Romania	For WBA lightweight title
54	Loss	48–5–1	Leonard Doroftei	SD	12 (12)	2002–01–05	Freeman Coliseum, San Antonio, Texas, U.S.	Lost WBA lightweight title
53	Win	48–4–1	Julien Lorcy	MD	12 (12)	2001–10–08	Palais des Sports, Paris, France	Won WBA lightweight title
52	Win	47–4–1	Vincent Howard	KO	3 (10)	2001–07–14	Ce.De.M. N° 2, Caseros, Argentina	
51	Win	46–4–1	Alberto Sicurella	TKO	10 (12)	2001–03–17	Ce.De.M. N° 2, Caseros, Argentina	
50	Win	45–4–1	Justo Martinez	RTD	10 (12)	2000–08–26	Salon Tattersall, San Isidro, Argentina	Retained South American lightweight title
49	Win	44–4–1	Ariel Aparicio	KO	1 (10)	2000–06–08	Argentina	
48	Win	43–4–1	Walter Rodriguez	RTD	8 (12)	2000–04–22	Club Los Indios, Moreno, Argentina	Won vacant South American lightweight title
47	Win	42–4–1	Ruben Oliva	TKO	5 (10)	1999–12–18	Club Argentino de Quilmes, Quilmes, Argentina	
46	Win	41–4–1	Santos Rebolledo	UD	12 (12)	1999–11–17	Hotel El Panamá, Panama City, Panama	Won vacant WBA Fedelatin lightweight title
45	Win	40–4–1	Roberto Ortega	UD	10 (10)	1999–07–31	Villa Domínico, Argentina	
44	Win	39–4–1	Luis Sosa	UD	10 (10)	1999–05–08	Club Argentino de Quilmes, Quilmes, Argentina	
43	Win	38–4–1	Jorge David Gomez	TKO	2 (10)	1999–02–26	Club Atletico Quilmes, Mar del Plata, Argentina	
42	Win	37–4–1	Carlos Vilches	KO	2 (10)	1998–11–28	Buenos Aires, Argentina	
41	Draw	36–4–1	Ruben Oliva	PTS	8 (8)	1998–10–10	Buenos Aires, Argentina	
40	Win	36–4	Hector Martinez	KO	1 (10)	1998–07–25	Estudios Canal 9 TV, Buenos Aires, Argentina	
39	Win	35–4	Daniel Zielinski	UD	10 (10)	1998–05–23	Buenos Aires, Argentina	
38	Win	34–4	Marcelo Cesar	KO	1 (10)	1998–04–04	Buenos Aires, Argentina	
37	Win	33–4	Victor Hugo Sanchez	TKO	2 (10)	1998–02–28	Buenos Aires, Argentina	
36	Win	32–4	Angel Vera	KO	2 (10)	1998–01–24	Estudios Canal 9 TV, Buenos Aires, Argentina	
35	Win	31–4	Hector Martinez	TKO	4 (10)	1997–12–20	Estudios Canal 9 TV, Buenos Aires, Argentina	
34	Loss	30–4	Walter Rodriguez	SD	10 (10)	1997–11–22	Buenos Aires, Argentina	
33	Win	30–3	Manuel Billalba	PTS	10 (10)	1997–10–04	Buenos Aires, Argentina	
32	Win	29–3	Raul Cardenas	KO	3 (10)	1997–08–16	Buenos Aires, Argentina	
31	Win	28–3	Victor Hugo Sanchez	DQ	5 (8)	1997–07–19	Villa Gesell, Argentina	
30	Win	27–3	Angel Vera	RTD	7 (10)	1997–06–07	Estudios Canal 9 TV, Buenos Aires, Argentina	
29	Win	26–3	Ramon Collado	PTS	10 (10)	1997–05–10	Estadio F.A.B., Buenos Aires, Argentina	
28	Loss	25–3	Artur Grigorian	TKO	11 (12)	1997–02–22	Sporthalle, Wandsbek, Germany	For WBO lightweight title
27	Win	25–2	Rildo Jose Oliveira	KO	2 (12)	1996–12–25	Buenos Aires, Argentina	Won vacant WBO Latino lightweight title
26	Loss	24–2	Alberto Roda	PTS	10 (10)	1996–08–17	Estudios Canal 9 TV, Buenos Aires, Argentina	
25	Win	24–1	Ramon Collado	RTD	5 (10)	1996–07–27	Estadio F.A.B., Buenos Aires, Argentina	
24	Win	23–1	Manuel Billalba	PTS	10 (10)	1996–05–25	Estadio F.A.B., Buenos Aires, Argentina	
23	Win	22–1	Sergio Atilio Martinez	TKO	8 (10)	1996–04–13	Buenos Aires, Argentina	
22	Win	21–1	Ricardo Vega	KO	2 (10)	1996–03–09	Buenos Aires, Argentina	
21	Win	20–1	Simon Canache	UD	12 (12)	1995–10–28	Estudios Canal 9 TV, Buenos Aires, Argentina	Retained South American lightweight title
20	Loss	19–1	Manuel Billalba	PTS	10 (10)	1995–09–09	Buenos Aires, Argentina	
19	Win	19–0	Philippe Binante	PTS	8 (8)	1995–07–25	Saint-Jean-de-Luz, France	
18	Win	18–0	Faustino Martires Barrios	PTS	10 (10)	1995–07–15	Buenos Aires, Argentina	
17	Win	17–0	Simon Canache	DQ	5 (12)	1995–06–03	Buenos Aires, Argentina	Won vacant South American lightweight title
16	Win	16–0	Daniel Zielinski	TKO	5 (8)	1995–05–13	Estadio F.A.B., Buenos Aires, Argentina	
15	Win	15–0	Pedro Villegas	TKO	3 (8)	1995–04–07	La Rioja, Argentina	
14	Win	14–0	Ruben Astorga	KO	6 (8)	1995–04–01	Buenos Aires, Argentina	
13	Win	13–0	Fabian Bazan	TKO	3 (8)	1995–03–03	La Rioja, Argentina	
12	Win	12–0	Marco Antonio Dos Santos	TKO	2 (8)	1995–01–21	Estudios Canal 9 TV, Buenos Aires, Argentina	
11	Win	11–0	Rene Adelqui Collado	TKO	5 (8)	1994–12–28	Buenos Aires, Argentina	
10	Win	10–0	Omar Victoriano Alegre	TKO	2 (8)	1994–12–03	Polideportivo Delmi, Salta, Argentina	
9	Win	9–0	Daniel Zielinski	PTS	8 (8)	1994–11–19	Buenos Aires, Argentina	
8	Win	8–0	Stephan Galtier	TKO	1 (8)	1994–10–01	Arena de Cosets, Carpentras, France	
7	Win	7–0	Marcelo Gutierrez	TKO	4 (6)	1994–08–27	Estadio F.A.B., Buenos Aires, Argentina	
6	Win	6–0	Gustavo Cuello	KO	1 (6)	1994–07–02	Estadio F.A.B., Buenos Aires, Argentina	
5	Win	5–0	Raul Notti	KO	1 (6)	1994–06–25	Buenos Aires, Argentina	
4	Win	4–0	Philippe Mohammed Udofe	KO	5 (6)	1994–05–21	Estadio F.A.B., Buenos Aires, Argentina	
3	Win	3–0	Jorge Carballo	DQ	3 (6)	1994–04–21	Club Nolting, Ciudadela, Argentina	
2	Win	2–0	Leonardo Tissera	KO	1 (6)	1993–12–04	Estadio F.A.B., Buenos Aires, Argentina	
1	Win	1–0	Juan Bautista Sosa	KO	1 (6)	1993–11–19	Mercedes, Argentina	

== See also ==
- List of world lightweight boxing champions

Sporting positions
Regional boxing titles
Vacant Title last held by Fabian de Jesus Alvarez	South American lightweight champion June 3, 1995 – 1995; Vacated	Vacant Title next held by Ricardo Daniel Silva
New title	WBO Latino lightweight Champion; December 25, 1996 – 1997; Vacated	Vacant Title next held by Oscar Garcia Cano
Vacant Title last held by Miguel Callist	WBA Fedelatin lightweight champion November 17, 1999 – 2000; Vacated	Vacant Title next held by Miguel Callist
Vacant Title last held by Daniel Sarmiento	South American lightweight champion April 22, 2000 – 2000; Vacated	Vacant Title next held by Carlos Wilfredo Vilches
Vacant Title last held by Jorge Luis Noriega Medrano	WBA Fedelatin light-welterweight champion May 26, 2005 – 2006; Vacated	Vacant Title next held by Miguel Callist
World boxing titles
Preceded by Julien Lorcy	WBA lightweight champion October 8, 2001 – January 5, 2002	Succeeded by Leonard Doroftei
