= Baek Jong-kwon =

South Korean boxer (born 1971)

Jong-Kwon Baek
Personal information
- Nationality: (South Korea) South Korean
- Born: Baek Jong-kwon; November 7, 1971 (age 54) Jinju, South Gyeongsang Province, South Korea
- Weight: Super featherweight

Boxing career
- Stance: Orthodox

Boxing record
- Total fights: 25
- Wins: 23
- Win by KO: 20
- Losses: 1
- Draws: 1
- No contests: 0

Jong-Kwon Baek (Korean: 백종권; Hanja: 白鐘権; born November 7, 1971, in Jinju, South Gyeongsang Province, South Korea) is a former boxer from South Korea.

== Professional boxing career ==
On October 31, 1999, Baek defeated Lakva Sim by split decision to win the WBA super featherweight championship.

He made his first title defense against fellow South Korean Kyu Chul Choi on January 30, 2000, with the fight ending in a split draw after 12 rounds.

Baek lost the WBA super featherweight title to Cuban boxer Joel Casamayor on May 21, 2000, losing by fifth-round technical knockout.

He finished his professional boxing career with a record of 23 wins (20 knockouts), 1 loss, and 1 draw.

== Professional boxing record ==
25 fights	23 wins	1 loss
By knockout	20	1
By decision	3	0
Draws	1	

No.	Result	Record	Opponent	Type	Round, time	Date	Location	Notes
25	Win	23–1–1	(Philippines) Rex Marzan	TKO	3 (10), 2:58	Apr 20, 2002	Saenghwal Gymnasium, Jinju, South Korea	
24	Win	22–1–1	(Thailand) Kongsuk Kiatchaiyong	KO	5 (10), 1:59	Jan 30, 2001	Central City Millenium Hall, Seoul, South Korea	
23	Loss	21–1–1	(Cuba) Joel Casamayor	TKO	5 (12), 2:18	May 21, 2000	(United States) Harrah's Casino, Kansas City, Missouri, U.S.	Lost WBA super featherweight title
22	Draw	21–0–1	(South Korea) Choi Kyu-Chul	PTS	12	Jan 30, 2000	Pohang Indoor Gymnasium, Pohang, South Korea	Retained WBA super featherweight title
21	Win	21–0	(Mongolia) Lakva Sim	SD	12	Oct 31, 1999	Gudeok Gymnasium, Busan, South Korea	Won WBA super featherweight title
20	Win	20–0	(Mexico) Esteban Lorenzo	KO	6 (10), 2:08	Jul 6, 1999	Gudeok Gymnasium, Busan, South Korea	
19	Win	19–0	(Philippines) Nick Enero	TKO	9 (12), 0:40	Apr 10, 1998	Dankook University, Cheonan, South Korea	Retained OPBF lightweight title
18	Win	18–0	(Philippines) Teofilo Tunacao	KO	10 (12), 0:18	Jul 18, 1997	Ansan Gymnasium, Ansan, South Korea	Retained OPBF lightweight title
17	Win	17–0	(Philippines) Ali Albaracin	KO	1 (12), 2:43	Mar 13, 1997	Gwangmyeong, South Korea	Won OPBF lightweight title
16	Win	16–0	(Philippines) Jun Mondonedo	KO	4 (10), 2:58	Nov 13, 1996	Pyeongtaek, South Korea	
15	Win	15–0	(Philippines) Alfredo Baguio	TKO	4 (10), 2:01	Aug 26, 1996	Seoul, South Korea	
14	Win	14–0	(Philippines) Nick Ampong	KO	2 (10), 2:37	May 2, 1996	Gwangmyeong, South Korea	
13	Win	13–0	(Philippines) Boy Ligas	PTS	10	Nov 24, 1995	Ansan, South Korea	
12	Win	12–0	(South Korea) Kim Jae-Kyung	PTS	10	Aug 23, 1995	Gwangmyeong, South Korea	
11	Win	11–0	(Philippines) Lauro Wilton	TKO	8 (10), 0:24	Mar 31, 1995	Ansan, South Korea	
10	Win	10–0	(Philippines) Al Coquilla	TKO	10 (10), 2:18	Feb 8, 1995	Seoul, South Korea	
9	Win	9–0	(South Korea) Lee Gab-Yong	UD	10	Mar 26, 1994	Olympic Park Gymnasium, Seoul, South Korea	Won South Korean lightweight title
8	Win	8–0	(South Korea) Kim Han-Jin	KO	2 (8), 2:36	Nov 21, 1993	(South Korea) Munhwa Gymnasium, Seoul	
7	Win	7–0	(South Korea) Chung Heun-Guk	KO	2 (8), 2:20	Jul 31, 1993	Munhwa Gymnasium, Seoul, South Korea	
6	Win	6–0	(South Korea) Lee Chang-Hoon	KO	1 (8), 2:20	Jul 3, 1993	Education Culture Center, Seoul, South Korea	
5	Win	5–0	(South Korea) Lim Hyo-Young	KO	5 (6), 0:35	Jan 16, 1993	Seoul, South Korea	
4	Win	4–0	(South Korea) Park Jong-Ho	TKO	2 (4), 3:08	Dec 19, 1992	Munhwa Gymnasium, Seoul, South Korea	
3	Win	3–0	(South Korea) Kim Bon-Dol	TKO	2 (4), 1:35	Nov 21, 1992	Munhwa Gymnasium, Seoul, South Korea	
2	Win	2–0	(South Korea) Kim Ui-Man	KO	2 (4), 2:33	Nov 20, 1992	Munhwa Gymnasium, Seoul, South Korea	
1	Win	1–0	(South Korea) Choi Sung-Ho	KO	3 (4), 2:58	Sep 26, 1992	Pohang Gymnasium, Pohang, South Korea	

Preceded by Lakva Sim	WBA Super Featherweight Champion; 31 October 1999 – 21 May 2000	Succeeded by Joel Casamayor
