= János Petrovics =

Hungarian boxer (1971–2024)

Personal information
- Nationality: Hungarian
- Born: 9 August 1971 Dombóvár, Hungary
- Died: 8 July 2024 (aged 52) Hévíz, Hungary

Sport
- Sport: Boxing

Achievements and titles
- Olympic finals: 1992 Summer Olympics

János Petrovics (9 August 1971 – 8 July 2024) was a Hungarian boxer. He competed in the men's lightweight event at the 1992 Summer Olympics. Petrovics died in Hévíz on 8 July 2024, at the age of 52.
