= Vasile Nistor =

Romanian boxer

Personal information
- Nationality: Romanian
- Born: 9 June 1967 (age 58)

Sport
- Sport: Boxing

Vasile Nistor (born 9 June 1967) is a Romanian boxer. He competed in the men's lightweight event at the 1992 Summer Olympics.
