= Mauricio Ávila =

Guatemalan boxer

Personal information
- Nationality: Guatemalan
- Born: 23 April 1973 (age 51)

Sport
- Sport: Boxing

Mauricio Ávila (born 23 April 1973) is a Guatemalan boxer. He competed in the men's lightweight event at the 1992 Summer Olympics.
