= Stéphane Haccoun =

French boxer (born 1967)

Stephane Haccoun
Personal information
- Nationality: French
- Born: Stephane Haccoun; 31 August 1967 Paris, France
- Height: 5 ft 5.5 in (1.66 m)
- Weight: Featherweight; Super Featherweight; Junior Lightweight

Boxing career
- Stance: Southpaw;left-handed

Boxing record
- Wins: 35
- Win by KO: 22
- Losses: 4
- Draws: 1

Stéphane Haccoun (born 31 August 1967 in Paris, France) is a former southpaw French boxer.

He fought as a featherweight, a super featherweight, and a junior lightweight.

In preparation to compete for the European Featherweight title, he defeated Fabrice Benichou on 3 June 1993, at the Palais de Sport in Marseille, winning in a ten round points decision.

== Taking the EBU Featherweight title ==
On 24 September 1993, he defeated Mauricio Stecca for the EBU European Feather Title at the Marseille's Palais de Sports in a ninth round technical knockout.

He competed unsuccessfully for the IBF World Featherweight title against Tom "Boom Boom" Johnson, losing in a ninth round knockout, on 30 November 1993 at the Palais de Sports in Marseille. Johnson easily won every round, using his superior speed, reach and ability, to dominate the bout with direct rights and hard left jabs. He scored the knockdown 1 minute and 15 seconds into the ninth.

He relinquished the EBU Featherweight title on 22 March 1994, losing to Stephano Zoff in Charleroi, Belgium in a ninth round technical knockout.

== See also ==
- List of select Jewish boxers

== Link ==
- Boxing record for Stéphane Haccoun from BoxRec (registration required)
