= Sandro Casamonica =

Italian boxer (born 1969)

Medal record

Representing Italy

Men's Boxing

European Amateur Championships
Bronze medal – third place	1989 Athens	Featherweight

Sandro Casamonica (born December 3, 1969, in Rome) is a professional boxer from Italy, who won the bronze medal in the featherweight division at the 1989 European Amateur Boxing Championships in Athens, Greece. Nicknamed Zorba, he made his professional debut in 1992.

Casamonica won the WBO Inter-Continental Lightweight Title on December 17, 1999, by defeating Víctor Baute of Spain. A year later he captured the WBA International Lightweight Title after knocking down Hungary's Zoltan Kalocsai. He was stripped of the title on February 18, 2002, due to his failure to defend his belt against Miguel Callist.

== Professional boxing record ==
39 fights	34 wins	5 losses
By knockout	21	3
By decision	13	2

No.	Result	Record	Opponent	Type	Round, Time	Date	Location	Notes
39	Loss	34–5	(United States) Paulie Malignaggi	TD	7 (12)	4 Dec 2004	(United States) Barton Coliseum, Little Rock, US	Fight stopped due to a cut caused by an accidental head clash - went to the scorecards;For WBC International super lightweight title
38	Win	34–4	(France) Samir Hamzaoui	PTS	6	24 Jul 2004	Civitavecchia, Lazio, Italy	
37	Win	33–4	(Romania) Marian Leondraliu	PTS	6	8 May 2004	Civitavecchia, Lazio, Italy	
36	Win	32–4	(France) Franck Patte	PTS	6	9 Dec 2003	Allianz Cloud Arena, Milan, Italy	
35	Win	31–4	(France) Nasser Lakrib	PTS	6	14 Oct 2003	PalaItalia, Milan, Italy	
34	Win	30–4	(Romania) Mircea Lurci	PTS	6	22 Jul 2003	Piazza della Vittoria, Pavia, Italy	
33	Loss	29–4	(Wales) Jason Cook	KO	3 (12)	2 Aug 2002	San Mango d'Aquino, Calabria, Italy	For vacant EBU European lightweight title
32	Win	29–3	(Morocco) Abdelilah Touil	UD	12	9 Nov 2001	Cagliari, Sardinia, Italy	Retained WBA Inter-Continental lightweight title
31	Win	28–3	(Hungary) Zoltan Kalocsai	KO	4 (12)	10 Aug 2001	Catanzaro, Calabria, Italy	Won WBA Inter-Continental lightweight title
30	Win	27–3	(France) Ali Lefenni	KO	5 (6)	26 May 2001	Trieste, Friuli-Venezia Giulia, Italy	
29	Win	26–3	(Ivory Coast) Kimoun Kouassi	PTS	6	17 Mar 2001	Rome, Lazio, Italy	
28	Win	25–3	(Nigeria) Sunday Aderoju	PTS	6	17 Feb 2001	Padua, Veneto, Italy	
27	Win	24–3	(Angola) Manuel Gomes	PTS	6	28 Jul 2000	Monfalcone, Friuli-Venezia Giulia, Italy	
26	Loss	23–3	(Uzbekistan) Artur Grigorian	TKO	9 (12) 1:48	19 Feb 2000	Estrel Hotel, Neukölln, Germany	For WBO lightweight title
25	Win	23–2	(Spain) Víctor Baute	KO	5 (12)	17 Dec 1999	Trapani, Sicily, Italy	Won WBO Inter-Continental lightweight title
24	Win	22–2	(Romania) Adrian Parlogea	KO	3 (?)	16 Oct 1999	PalaCinghiale, Bondeno, Italy	
23	Win	21–2	(Romania) Eugen Parvu	TKO	3 (6)	7 Aug 1999	Civitavecchia, Lazio, Italy	
22	Loss	20–2	(England) Billy Schwer	RTD	8 (12) 1:27	8 May 1999	York Hall, Bethnal Green, England, UK	Casamonica turned his back and walked to his corner;For EBU European lightweight title
21	Win	20–1	(Italy) Gianni Gelli	KO	6 (10)	24 Oct 1998	San Marino City, San Marino	Retained Federazione Pugilistica Italiana lightweight title
20	Win	19–1	(Italy) Athos Menegola	TKO	6 (10)	6 Dec 1997	PalaGallo, Catanzaro, Italy	Fight stopped due to injury;Retained Federazione Pugilistica Italiana lightweight title
19	Win	18–1	(Italy) Massimo Bertozi	KO	1 (10)	15 Oct 1997	Cadelbosco di Sopra, Emilia-Romagna, Italy	Won Federazione Pugilistica Italiana lightweight title
18	Win	17–1	(Montenegro) Vukašin Dobrašinović	TKO	3 (8)	9 Aug 1997	San Gennaro Vesuviano, Campania, Italy	Fight stopped due to injury
17	Win	16–1	(Serbia) Zoran Sekularac	TKO	7 (?)	10 May 1997	PalaLottomatica, Rome, Italy	
16	Win	15–1	(United States) Mike Fernandez	TKO	5 (?)	19 Apr 1997	Allianz Cloud Arena, Milan, Italy	
15	Win	14–1	(Spain) Alberto Lopez	PTS	8	12 Oct 1996	Mediolanum Forum, Assago, Milan, Italy	
14	Win	13–1	(Belgium) Pascal Montulet	TKO	2 (?)	20 Jun 1996	Mediolanum Forum, Assago, Milan, Italy	
13	Win	12–1	(Italy) Antonio Strabello	TKO	2 (?)	9 Mar 1996	Allianz Cloud Arena, Milan, Italy	
12	Win	11–1	(Croatia) Smal Jakupi	TKO	3 (?) 1:03	10 Feb 1996	PalaLottomatica, Rome, Italy	
11	Win	10–1	(Mexico) Alfonso Garcia	KO	2 (?)	16 Dec 1995	Voghera, Lombardy, Italy	
10	Win	9–1	(Tunisia) Michelle Dahmani	TKO	5 (?)	14 Jul 1995	Sheraton Rome Parco de Medici, Rome, Italy	
9	Loss	8–1	(Democratic Republic of the Congo) Mazasi Kongodi	PTS	8	17 Feb 1995	Rome, Lazio, Italy	
8	Win	8–0	(Tunisia) Mohamed Soltani	TKO	5 (?)	26 Dec 1994	Rome, Lazio, Italy	
7	Win	7–0	(Hungary) Aladar Horvath	PTS	6	2 Nov 1994	PalaLottomatica, Rome, Italy	
6	Win	6–0	(Algeria) Rachid Bouri	TKO	2 (?)	24 Nov 1993	Palasport Flaminio, Rimini, Italy	
5	Win	5–0	(Democratic Republic of the Congo) Mazasi Kongodi	PTS	6	24 Sep 1993	PalaLottomatica, Rome, Italy	
4	Win	4–0	(Hungary) Ferenc Szakallas	PTS	6	30 Jul 1993	Salò, Lombardy, Italy	
3	Win	3–0	(Hungary) Janos Santa	TKO	2 (?)	5 Mar 1993	Lumezzane, Lombardy, Italy	
2	Win	2–0	(Croatia) Dragutin Barcanac	KO	5 (6)	19 Dec 1992	Mediolanum Forum, San Severo, Italy	
1	Win	1–0	(Croatia) Miljenko Vuletin	KO	4 (6)	7 Oct 1992	Priverno, Lazio, Italy	Professional debut
