= Emil Rizk =

Egyptian boxer

Personal information
- Nationality: Egyptian
- Born: 24 January 1970 (age 55) Egypt
- Height: 173 cm (5 ft 8 in)
- Weight: 60 kg (132 lb)

Sport
- Country: Egypt
- Sport: Boxing

Emil Rizk is an Egyptian Olympic boxer. He represented his country in the lightweight division at the 1992 Summer Olympics. He lost his first bout against Ronald Chavez.
