= Leonard Doroftei =

Romanian boxer (born 1970)

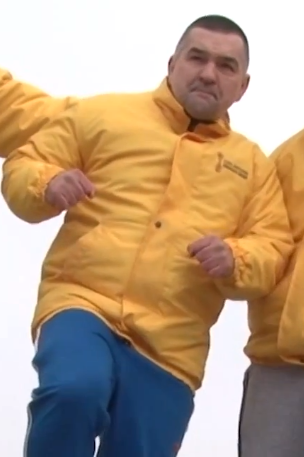
- Doroftei in 2014

Personal information
- Nickname: The Lion
- Nationality: Romanian
- Born: Leonard Dorin Doroftei; April 10, 1970 (age 56) Ploiești, Romania
- Height: 1.63 m (5 ft 4 in)
- Weight: Lightweight; Light welterweight

Boxing career
- Stance: Orthodox

Boxing record
- Total fights: 24
- Wins: 22
- Win by KO: 8
- Losses: 1
- Draws: 1
Medal record
Representing Romania
Romania National Amateur Boxing Championships
Silver medal – second place	1991 Bucharest	-60 kg
Gold medal – first place	1992 Bucharest	-63.5 kg
Gold medal – first place	1993 Constanța	-63.5 kg
Gold medal – first place	1994 Brăila	-60 kg
Gold medal – first place	1997 Bucharest	-60 kg
Olympic Games
Bronze medal – third place	1992 Barcelona	-63.5 kg
Bronze medal – third place	1996 Atlanta	-60 kg
World amateur championships
Gold medal – first place	1995 Berlin	-60 kg
European amateur championships
Bronze medal – third place	1993 Bursa	-63.5 kg
Gold medal – first place	1996 Vejle	-60 kg

Leonard Dorin Doroftei (Romanian pronunciation: [le.oˈnard dorofˈtej], also known as Leonard Dorin; born 10 April 1970) is a Romanian former boxer, the WBA Lightweight World Champion from 5 January 2002 to 24 October 2003.

== Amateur highlights ==
Doroftei took up boxing at the age of 14 at the Ploieşti boxing club. From 1983 to 1984, he won every Romanian national junior title. He went on to win four national senior titles in 1992–1994 and 1997. He won bronze medals at the 1992 Summer Olympics in Barcelona and the 1996 Summer Olympics in Atlanta. In addition, he was declared World Champion in 1995 and European Champion in 1996. His record as an amateur was 239 victories and 15 defeats.

=== Olympic results ===
1992 (as a Light Welterweight)

- Defeated Edgar Ruiz (Mexico) 24–4
- Defeated Arlo Chavez (Philippines) 15–1
- Defeated Peter Richardson (Great Britain) points
- Lost to Mark Leduc (Canada) 6–32

1996 (as a Lightweight)

- Defeated Julio Mboumba (Gabon) RSC 23 (1:46)
- Defeated Sergey Kopenkin (Kyrgyzstan) 23–1
- Defeated Koba Gogoladze (Georgia) 23–8
- Lost to Hocine Soltani (Algeria) 32–9

== Professional career ==
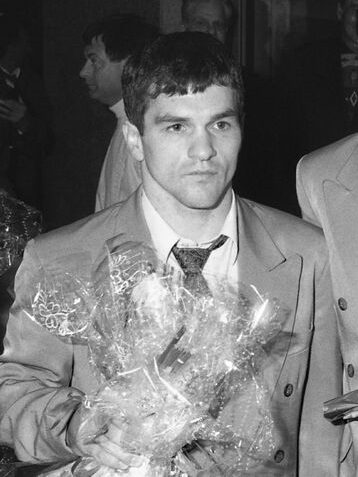
Doroftei in 1995

In 1997, Doroftei turned professional, signing with the Canadian club Interbox. Throughout his career, Dorin competed on ESPN, Showtime, and HBO. On 5 January 2002 he won the WBA world lightweight title, winning in a thrilling split decision over Argentinian boxer Raul Horacio Balbi 112–115, 114–113, 115–112. On 31 May the two fought again in Bucharest; this time, Dorin scored a knockdown en route to a clear cut unanimous decision victory, 118–111, 117–112 and 118–110.

A lightweight title unification bout on 17 May 2003 with American boxer Paul Spadafora, the IBF champion, ended in a draw, 114–114, 115–113, 114–115. The bout took place in Spadafora's hometown of Pittsburgh, and Dorin was a significant underdog. However, Dorin seemed to control the vast majority of the fight. He got to Spadafora early and often, surprising the champ with his intensity and workrate. Most observers agreed that Dorin had been robbed of a decision he deserved. Unfortunately for both fighters and boxing fans, a rematched never materialized.

On 24 October 2003, Doroftei was to fight a match against Panamanian boxer Miguel Callist. Doroftei had already announced that this would be his last professional match regardless of the result. As it turned out, the match was cancelled after Doroftei exceeded the maximum weight for lightweights at the weigh-in: he was 4 1/4 pounds (1.9 kg) over the 135 pounds (61 kg) weight limit, so he lost his WBA title.

On 24 July 2004, Doroftei lost his undefeated mark when he tried to get the WBC title, getting knocked out with a body shot in two rounds by Arturo Gatti.

== Retirement ==
He now resides in Romania with his wife and 3 children and is working as a trainer for boxing prospects. He has his own pub-restaurant in Ploiești, which is decorated with his photos and memories from his boxing career. In November 2012, he was elected President of Romanian Boxing Federation.

== Professional boxing record ==
24 fights	22 wins	1 loss
By knockout	8	1
By decision	14	0
Draws	1	

No.	Result	Record	Opponent	Type	Round, time	Date	Location	Notes
24	Loss	22–1–1	(Canada) Arturo Gatti	KO	2 (12)	Jul 24, 2004	(United States) Boardwalk Hall, Atlantic City, New Jersey, U.S.	For WBC super lightweight title
23	Win	22–0–1	(United States) Charles Tschorniawsky	TKO	4 (12)	Mar 20, 2004	Montreal Casino, Montreal, Quebec, Canada	
22	Draw	21–0–1	(United States) Paul Spadafora	SD	12	May 17, 2003	(United States) Petersen Events Center, Pittsburgh, Pennsylvania, U.S.	Retained WBA lightweight title; For IBF lightweight title
21	Win	21–0	(Argentina) Raul Horacio Balbi	UD	12	May 31, 2002	Sala Polivalentă, Bucharest, Romania	Retained WBA lightweight title
20	Win	20–0	(Argentina) Raul Horacio Balbi	SD	12	Jan 05, 2002	(United States) Freeman Coliseum, San Antonio, Texas, U.S.	Won WBA lightweight title
19	Win	19–0	(United States) Emanuel Augustus	UD	10	Sep 28, 2001	(United States) War Memorial Gymnasium, San Francisco, California, U.S.	
18	Win	18–0	(United States) Martin O'Malley	TKO	9 (10)	Jul 21, 2001	(United States) Bally's Atlantic City, Atlantic City, New Jersey, U.S.	O'Malley sustains a hairline fracture in his left ring finger and spends the next six weeks in a cast
17	Win	17–0	(Canada) Darelle Sukerow	KO	5 (8)	Dec 15, 2000	Molson Centre, Montreal, Quebec, Canada	
16	Win	16–0	(Australia) Gairy St Clair	UD	10	Sep 08, 2000	Molson Centre, Montreal, Quebec, Canada	
15	Win	15–0	(Puerto Rico) Jose Aponte	TKO	8 (8)	Jun 16, 2000	Molson Centre, Montreal, Quebec, Canada	
14	Win	14–0	(Argentina) Gustavo Fabian Cuello	SD	10	Apr 06, 2000	Air Canada Centre, Toronto, Ontario, Canada	
13	Win	13–0	(United States) Rudolfo Lunsford	UD	8	Mar 07, 2000	Molson Centre, Montreal, Quebec, Canada	
12	Win	12–0	(United States) Verdell Smith	UD	10	Dec 10, 1999	Molson Centre, Montreal, Quebec, Canada	
11	Win	11–0	(United States) Darien Ford	UD	8	Oct 29, 1999	Molson Centre, Montreal, Quebec, Canada	
10	Win	10–0	(Canada) Jean-Luc Morin	TKO	3 (8)	Oct 13, 1999	Molson Centre, Montreal, Quebec, Canada	
9	Win	9–0	(Guyana) Dillon Carew	PTS	12	Apr 30, 1999	(United States) Turning Stone Casino, Verona, New York, U.S.	For WBC Continental Americas super lightweight title
8	Win	8–0	(United States) Bernard Harris	SD	10	Feb 05, 1999	Centre Pierre Charbonneau, Montreal, Quebec, Canada	
7	Win	7–0	(United States) Steve Valdez	TKO	6 (8)	Nov 27, 1998	Molson Centre, Montreal, Quebec, Canada	
6	Win	6–0	(United States) Khalil Shakeel	UD	8	Nov 06, 1998	Centre Pierre Charbonneau, Montreal, Quebec, Canada	
5	Win	5–0	(United States) Michael Balagna	KO	1 (6)	Oct 14, 1998	Centre Pierre Charbonneau, Montreal, Quebec, Canada	
4	Win	4–0	(Canada) Don Sponagle	TKO	2 (6)	Sep 24, 1998	Centre Pierre Charbonneau, Montreal, Quebec, Canada	
3	Win	3–0	(United States) Sean Knight	UD	6	May 28, 1998	(United States) Westchester County Center, White Plains, New York, U.S.	
2	Win	2–0	(Canada) Martin Aubut	UD	6	May 5, 1998	Pavillon de la Jeunesse, Trois-Rivières, Quebec, Canada	
1	Win	1–0	(United States) Jerry Villareal	UD	4	Apr 24, 1998	Palais Sports Leopold-Drolet, Sherbrooke, Quebec, Canada	

Achievements
Preceded by Raul Horacio Balbi	WBA Lightweight Champion; 5 January 2002 – 2004 (vacates)	Succeeded by Lakva Sim
