= Billy Irwin (boxer) =

Canadian boxer (born 1968)

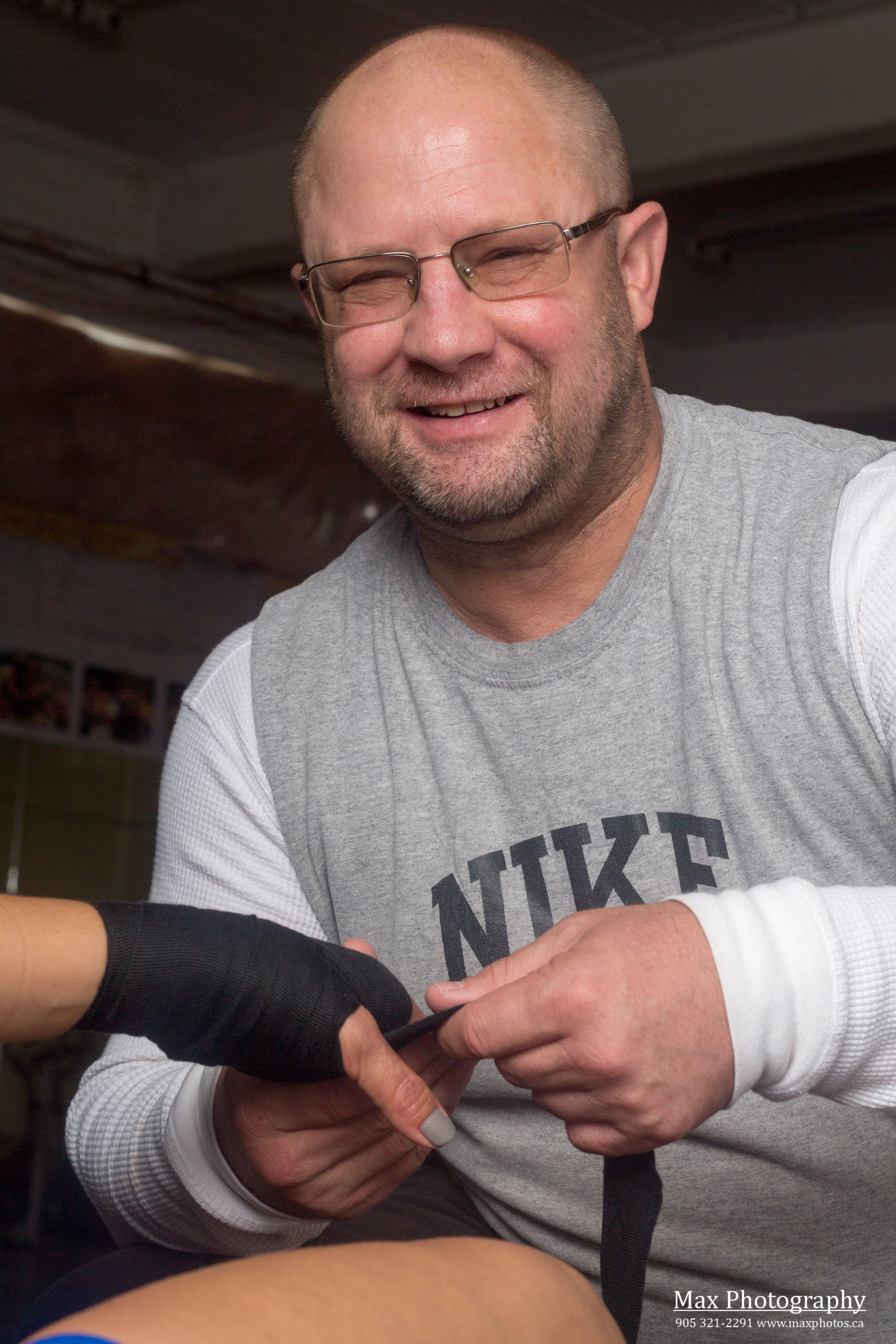
- Irwin in 2017

Personal information
- Full name: William Irwin
- Born: May 20, 1968 (age 58) Niagara Falls, Ontario, Canada

Sport
- Sport: Boxing
Medal record
Men's amateur boxing
Representing Canada
Pan American Games
Bronze medal – third place	1991 Havana	Lightweight

William Irwin (born May 20, 1968, Niagara Falls, Ontario, nicknamed "Billy the Kid", is a retired Canadian amateur lightweight and professional light/light welter/welterweight boxer of the 1990s and 2000s who as an amateur won a bronze medal in the Boxing at the 1991 Pan American Games in Havana, Cuba, losing to eventual silver medal winner Patrice Brooks of the United States, represented Canada at the 1991 World Amateur Boxing Championships in Sydney, Australia losing to Julien Lorcy of France. He represented Canada at the 1992 Summer Olympics in Barcelona but was stopped in the second round of the lightweight division (– 60 kg) by Ronald Chavez of the Philippines.

As a professional, he won the Canadian Professional Boxing Council, lightweight title, Canada lightweight title, International Boxing Organization (IBO) lightweight title, World Boxing Council (WBC) Continental Americas lightweight title, and Commonwealth lightweight title, and was a challenger for the International Boxing Federation (IBF) lightweight title against Paul Spadafora, and World Boxing Association (WBA) World lightweight title against Juan Díaz, his professional fighting weight varied from 133 1/2 lb (60.6 kg; 9 st 7.5 lb), i.e. lightweight to 142 lb (64.4 kg; 10 st 2.0 lb), i.e. welterweight.

Irwin's last stand was in 2005, against the undefeated World Champion Juan Diaz. After losing to Diaz, Irwin walked away in class retiring from a respectable pro boxing career that spanned over 12 years. He was a four time Canadian National Champion, a Bronze Medalist at the Pan-American Games, with an amateur record of 130-20-0 and a professional boxing record of 44 (31)–5-0.

He now trains amateurs, upcoming international fighters and professional boxers in Niagara Falls, Ontario. One of his fighters won the 2012 Canadian Champion Best Youth Boxer Award.

== Professional boxing record ==
48 fights	42 wins	6 losses
By knockout	30	1
By decision	12	5

No.	Result	Record	Opponent	Type	Round, time	Date	Location	Notes
48	Loss	42–6	Juan Díaz	TKO	9 (12), 1:27	Jan 21, 2005	Reliant Center, Houston, Texas, U.S.	For WBA lightweight title
47	Win	42–5	Lou Bizzarro	TKO	9 (10), 2:10	Jul 28, 2004	Avalon Hotel, Erie, Pennsylvania, U.S.	
46	Win	41–5	Mark Riggs	KO	1 (10), 1:44	Jul 5, 2003	CanWest Global Park, Winnipeg, Canada	
45	Win	40–5	Luis Gustavo Sosa	TKO	4 (10), 0:50	Apr 26, 2003	Hamilton Place Theatre, Hamilton, Canada	
44	Win	39–5	Richard Howard	TKO	2 (10)	Jan 17, 2003	Sawridge Hotel, Slave Lake, Canada	
43	Win	38–5	Vincent Howard	TKO	9 (10), 2:59	Oct 28, 2002	Hershey Centre, Mississauga, Canada	
42	Win	37–5	Mario Lechowski	TKO	7 (12), 1:02	Sep 14, 2002	Ed Lumley Arena, Cornwall, Canada	Won Canadian lightweight title
41	Win	36–5	Chad Brisson	MD	10	Apr 10, 2002	Royal York Hotel, Toronto, Canada	
40	Win	35–5	Teddy Worth	UD	6	Jan 31, 2002	Ramada Marlborough Hotel, Winnipeg, Canada	
39	Loss	34–5	Dorin Spivey	UD	10	Jun 15, 2001	The Blue Horizon, Philadelphia, Pennsylvania, U.S.	
38	Loss	34–4	Paul Spadafora	UD	12	Dec 16, 2000	David L. Lawrence Convention Center, Pittsburgh, Pennsylvania, U.S.	For IBF lightweight title
37	Win	34–3	Moisés Pedroza	TKO	1 (10), 2:35	Sep 23, 2000	Casino Rama, Rama, Canada	
36	Win	33–3	Miguel Arrozal	TKO	6 (10)	Jun 2, 2000	The Blue Horizon, Philadelphia, Pennsylvania, U.S.	
35	Win	32–3	Rubén Darío Oliva	KO	2 (10), 1:32	Apr 26, 2000	Saskatoon, Saskatchewan, Canada	
34	Win	31–3	John Bailey	TKO	7 (10), 2:05	Mar 24, 2000	The Blue Horizon, Philadelphia, Pennsylvania, U.S.	
33	Win	30–3	José Vida Ramos	TKO	4 (8), 2:10	Dec 10, 1999	The Blue Horizon, Philadelphia, Pennsylvania, U.S.	
32	Win	29–3	Larry O'Shields	TKO	6	Sep 24, 1994	The Blue Horizon, Philadelphia, Pennsylvania, U.S.	
31	Win	28–3	Damion Stutton	TKO	3 (8)	Aug 12, 1999	Slave Lake, Alberta, Canada	
30	Win	27–3	Shawn Simmons	TKO	2 (10), 1:57	Jul 20, 1999	Casino Windsor, Windsor, Canada	
29	Win	26–3	John Lark	KO	2 (10)	Jun 4, 1999	The Blue Horizon, Philadelphia, Pennsylvania, U.S.	
28	Win	25–3	David Armstrong	TKO	2 (10), 2:58	Mar 19, 1999	The Blue Horizon, Philadelphia, Pennsylvania, U.S.	
27	Win	24–3	Charles Tschorniawsky	TKO	8 (10)	Dec 11, 1998	The Blue Horizon, Philadelphia, Pennsylvania, U.S.	
26	Loss	23–3	Gerald Gray	SD	8	Oct 2, 1998	The Blue Horizon, Philadelphia, Pennsylvania, U.S.	
25	Loss	23–2	Ahmed Santos	UD	10	May 12, 1998	Corel Centre, Kanata, Canada	
24	Win	23–1	Andy Wong	UD	10	Apr 22, 1998	Royal York Hotel, Toronto, Canada	
23	Win	22–1	José Manjarrez	UD	10	Sep 15, 1997	Convention Centre, Edmonton, Canada	
22	Win	21–1	Andre Cray	SD	10	May 13, 1997	Grand Casino, Biloxi, Mississippi, U.S.	
21	Loss	20–1	David Tetteh	UD	12	Mar 4, 1997	Airport Hilton Hotel, Toronto, Canada	Lost Commonwealth lightweight title
20	Win	20–0	David Tetteh	MD	12	Oct 11, 1996	International Plaza Hotel, Toronto, Canada	Won Commonwealth lightweight title
19	Win	19–0	Daniel Sarmiento	KO	3 (10), 2:23	Aug 29, 1996	International Plaza Hotel, Toronto, Canada	
18	Win	18–0	Manuel Alberto Billalba	KO	8 (10)	Mar 30, 1996	Buenos Aires, Distrito Federal, Argentina	
17	Win	17–0	Juan Luis Sánchez	UD	10	Jan 25, 1996	International Plaza Hotel, Toronto, Canada	
16	Win	16–0	Jesús Rodríguez	MD	12	Sep 28, 1995	Westin Harbour Castle Hotel, Toronto, Canada	Won WBC Continental Americas lightweight title
15	Win	15–0	Amado Cabato	UD	12	Jun 8, 1995	Metro Convention Centre, Toronto, Canada	Won vacant IBO lightweight title
14	Win	14–0	Rodney Wilson	KO	6 (10)	Apr 28, 1995	Convention Centre, Edmonton, Canada	
13	Win	13–0	Bobby Johnson	KO	1 (10), 1:35	Feb 24, 1995	Palais des Sports Jonquière, Saguenay, Canada	
12	Win	12–0	Alex Pérez	KO	1 (10), 2:56	Jan 11, 1995	Curzon Health Club, Toronto, Canada	
11	Win	11–0	Stan Cunningham	TKO	4 (10)	Dec 9, 1994	Convention Centre, Edmonton, Canada	
10	Win	10–0	Steve Thomas	KO	1 (10), 2:46	Oct 27, 1994	Curzon Health Club, Toronto, Canada	
9	Win	9–0	Manuel Santiago	UD	8	Aug 11, 1994	MacDonald Field, Malden, Massachusetts, U.S.	
8	Win	8–0	Nedrick Simmons	TKO	8 (12), 2:20	Jun 8, 1994	Memorial Arena, Niagara Falls, Canada	Won CPBC lightweight title
7	Win	7–0	Charles Beals	KO	2 (10), 2:58	Apr 13, 1994	Royal York Hotel, Toronto, Canada	
6	Win	6–0	Dezi Ford	UD	6	Dec 9, 1993	Curzon Health Club, Toronto, Canada	
5	Win	5–0	Brent Mitchell	TKO	2 (6), 1:52	Oct 2, 1993	Grant MacEwan College, Edmonton, Canada	
4	Win	4–0	Ben Simmons	TKO	5 (6), 2:27	Jun 12, 1993	AJ Palumbo Center, Pittsburgh, Pennsylvania, U.S.	
3	Win	3–0	Clifford Hicks	UD	6	Apr 14, 1993	Royal York Hotel, Toronto, Canada	
2	Win	2–0	John Gottschling	KO	1 (6), 2:50	Mar 26, 1993	Sheraton Centre, Toronto, Canada	
1	Win	1–0	Charles McClellan	TKO	1 (6), 2:40	Feb 11, 1993	Niagara Falls Arena, Niagara Falls, Canada	
