= Delroy Leslie =

Jamaican boxer (born 1970)

Personal information
- Born: 27 February 1970 (age 56)
- Height: 168 cm (5 ft 6 in)
- Weight: 60 kg (132 lb)
Medal record
Men's boxing
Representing Jamaica
Pan American Games
Bronze medal – third place	1991 Havana	Lightweight
Central American and Caribbean Games
Silver medal – second place	1990 Mexico City	Lightweight

Delroy Leslie (born 27 February 1970) is a retired boxer from Jamaica, who competed for his native country at the 1992 Summer Olympics in Barcelona, Spain. Leslie competed in the Men's Lightweight (– 60 kg) division and was defeated in the first round by Japan's Shigeyuki Dobashi on points (5:11).

He has a daughter, Rayanna Leslie.
