= Adilson Silva (boxer) =

Brazilian boxer

Adilson Rosa da Silva
Personal information
- Full name: Adilson Rosa da Silva
- Born: 9 September 1967 (age 57); Minas Gerais, Brazil

Sport
- Sport: Boxing

Adilson Rosa da Silva (born 9 September 1967) is a Brazilian boxer. He competed in the men's lightweight event at the 1992 Summer Olympics.

Pugilista com experiências nacionais e internacionais, iniciou a carreira competitiva em 1983.

E com 15 anos foi campeão nos jogos abertos do interior de São Paulo, Brasil e vice campeão na Forja dos Campeões.

Em 1984, com 16 anos - foi Vice Campeão Paulista;

Nos anos de 1987 a 1993 - Campeão Paulista; Campeão no Torneio dos Campeões e 5 (cinco) vezes Campeão Brasileiro;

Suas experiências Internacionais com o Boxe Amador foram de 1990 a 1992, onde:

1990 - Copa do Mundo Havana/Cuba - 5º colocado;

1990 - Torneio em Veneza, Itália - 4º Colocado;

1991 - Panamericano Cuba - 6º Colocado;

1991 - Pré-olímpico Mendonça, Argentina - Campeão;

1991 - Torneio Boxean, Espanha - 3º Colocado;

Após um longo período ausente, os brasileiros voltaram a marcar presença na categoria do boxe nas Olimpíadas de Barcelona-1992. Na ocasião, o representante foi o mineiro Adilson Rosa da Silva, que logo na estreia foi derrotado pelo mítico Oscar De La Roya, que viria a se tornar campeão olímpico;

1992 - Olimpíadas de Barcelona - Colocado entre os 10 melhores;

Estreiou em 1994 - como Profissional,

Em 1995 - consagrando-se como Campeão Brasileiro;

Em 1996 - Cammpeão Inter Americano;

Em 1997 - 8º Colocado no Ranking da FIB (Federação Internacional de Boxe)

Totalizando Plantel no boxe profissional de: 12 lutas, 12 vitórias 8 por nocaute e 4 por pontos.
