= Dariusz Snarski =

Polish boxer

Personal information
- Nationality: Polish
- Born: 20 December 1968 (age 56); Bielsk Podlaski
- Height: 169 cm (5 ft 7 in)
- Weight: 60 kg (132 lb)

Sport
- Country: Poland
- Sport: Boxing

Dariusz Snarski is a Polish Olympic boxer. He represented his country in the lightweight division at the 1992 Summer Olympics. He won his first bout against Justin Rowsell of Australia, and then lost his second bout to Marco Rudolph of Germany.
