= Shigeyuki Dobashi =

Japanese boxer (born 1970)

Shigeyuki Dobashi (土橋 茂之, Dobashi Shigeyuki) (born November 19, 1970, in Chiba) is a retired boxer from Japan, who competed for his native country at the 1992 Summer Olympics in Barcelona.

Dobashi competed in the Men's Lightweight (– 60 kg) division. He defeated Jamaica's Delroy Leslie in the first round on points (11:5) before falling to France's Julien Lorcy (RSC-2) in the second round.
