= Ronald Chavez =

Filipino boxer

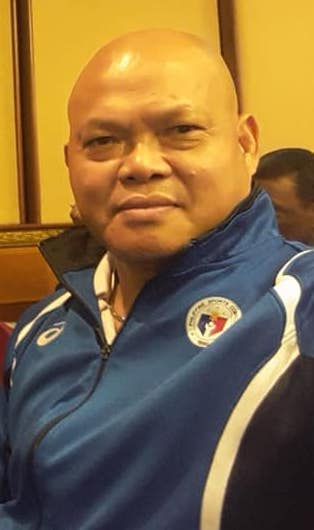

Personal information
- Born: September 11, 1969 (age 56) Bantayan Island, Cebu
- Height: 5 ft 8 in (173 cm)
- Weight: 130 lb (60 kg)

Boxing career
- Weight class: Featherweight, Lightweight, Light Welterweight
Medal record
Men's Boxing
Representing the Philippines
Asian Amateur Boxing Championships
Gold medal – first place	1992 Bangkok	Lightweight
Southeast Asian Games
Gold medal – first place	1991 Manila	Lightweight
Bronze medal – third place	1989 Kuala Lumpur	Featherweight
Bronze medal – third place	1993 Singapore	Light Welterweight

Ronald Chavez (born September 11, 1969) is a Filipino former amateur boxer who competed at the 1992 Summer Olympics and is currently one of the coaches of the Philippine national boxing team.

== Career ==
Chavez started out as a featherweight, winning a bronze medal at the 1989 Southeast Asian Games in Kuala Lumpur.

He eventually moved up to lightweight and captured a gold medal in his division at the 1991 Southeast Asian Games in Manila.

Chavez achieved the biggest win of his boxing career at the 1992 Asian Amateur Boxing Championships in Bangkok when he captured the gold medal in the lightweight division after defeating North Korean Yun Yong-chol in the final. The win proved to be special as he also booked a ticket to the 1992 Summer Olympics.

Chavez was among six Filipino boxers who competed in Barcelona. He defeated Egypt’s Emil Rizk and Canada’s William Irwin to reach the quarterfinals of the lightweight division where he was knocked out by South Korean Hong Sung-sik.

Chavez eventually moved up to light welterweight and won a bronze medal at the 1993 Southeast Asian Games in Singapore.

He retired after failing to qualify for the 1996 Summer Olympics. Chavez eventually joined the Philippine national boxing team coaching staff after hanging up his gloves.

=== Results ===
1992 Summer Olympics

Event	Round	Result	Opponent	Score
Lightweight	First	Win	(Egypt) Emil Rizk	18-10
Lightweight	Second	Win	(Canada) William Irwin	8-1
Lightweight	Quarterfinal	Loss	(South Korea) Hong Sung-sik	KO 1

== Personal life ==
Ronald Chavez is married to former volleyball player Zenaida Ybanez, with whom he has at least three children. Chavez's brother, Arlo as well as his son Ronald Jr. were also boxers.
