= Rashid Matumla =

Tanzanian boxer (born 1968)

Personal information
- Full name: Rashid Ali Hadj Matumla
- Nickname: Snakeboy
- Nationality: Tanzania
- Born: June 26, 1968 (age 58) Tanga, Tanga Region
- Height: 1.65 m (5 ft 5 in)
- Weight: 63 kg (139 lb)

Sport
- Sport: Boxing
- Weight class: Lightweight / Light Welterweight

Rashid Ali Hadj Matumla (born June 26, 1968, in Tanga) is a retired male boxer from Tanzania, who represented his native East African country in three consecutive Summer Olympics, starting in 1988 (Seoul). He was nicknamed Snakeboy during his career. Matumla also competed at two Commonwealth Games: 1994 and 1998. Matumla now lives at Keko suburb in Dar es Salaam.

== 1996 Olympic results ==
Below is the record of Rashid Ali Hadj Matumla, a Tanzanian light welterweight boxer who competed at the 1996 Atlanta Olympics:

- Round of 32: lost to Phillip Boudreault (Canada) on points, 12–16.

== See also ==
- Bruno Tarimo
- Goodluck Mrema
