= Justin Rowsell =

Australian boxer

Personal information
- Nationality: Australian
- Born: 22 December 1971 (age 54) Casino, New South Wales, Australia

Sport
- Sport: Boxing
Medal record
Boxing
Representing Australia
Commonwealth Games
Silver medal – second place	1990 Auckland	Men's Lightweight

Justin Rowsell (born 22 December 1971) is an Australian boxer. He competed in the men's lightweight event at the 1992 Summer Olympics.
