= Choi Yong-soo (boxer) =

South Korean boxer (born 1972)

Yong-soo Choi
Personal information
- Nationality: South Korean
- Born: Yong-soo Choi; August 20, 1972 (age 53) Dangjin, South Chungcheong Province, South Korea
- Height: 5 ft 8 in (1.73 m)
- Weight: Super Featherweight

Boxing career
- Stance: Orthodox

Boxing record
- Total fights: 34
- Wins: 29
- Win by KO: 19
- Losses: 4
- Draws: 1

Yong-soo Choi (Korean: 최용수; Hanja: 崔龍洙; born August 20, 1972 in Dangjin, South Chungcheong Province, South Korea) is a former boxer from South Korea.

In 1993, he won the Orient and Pacific Boxing Federation super featherweight title.

In 1995, Choi became the WBA super featherweight champion with a technical KO win over Victor Hugo Paz. He defended the belt seven times before losing it to Takanori Hatakeyama in 1998.

Preceded by Genaro Hernandez; Vacated	WBA Super Featherweight Champion; 21 October 1995 – 5 September 1998	Succeeded by Takanori Hatakeyama
