= Kondwani =

Kondwani is a masculine given name. Notable people with the name include:

- Kondwani Chiwina, Malawian middle-distance runner
- Kondwani Mtonga (born 1986), Zimbabwean footballer
- Kondwani Nankhumwa (born 1978), Malawian politician

== See also ==
- Meshack Kondwani, Zimbabwean boxer
