= Ali Funeka =

South African boxer (born 1978)

Personal information
- Nickname: Rush Hour
- Born: 28 March 1978 (age 48) Mdantsane, Eastern Cape, South Africa
- Height: 1.85 m (6 ft 1 in)
- Weight: Super-featherweight; Lightweight; Light-welterweight; Welterweight

Boxing career
- Reach: 183 cm (72 in)
- Stance: Orthodox

Boxing record
- Total fights: 54
- Wins: 40
- Win by KO: 32
- Losses: 11
- Draws: 3

Ali Mziyanda Funeka (born 28 March 1978) is a South African professional boxer. He held the IBO welterweight world title from 2014 to 2015, previously challenged three times for a lightweight world title between 2009 and 2010, and held the South African super featherweight title between 2004–2006 and in 2014.

== Professional career ==
Funeka turned pro in 1995 at the 112 pound weight class. After moving up in weight and fighting mostly journeymen, he stepped up in class to challenge Mzonke Fana for the South African super featherweight title in 2002. Although he knocked Fana down in the 1st, Funeka lost a decision. After winning several regional titles, Funeka rose to fame with an upset knockout win over Zahir Raheem in an IBF Lightweight Title Eliminator in 2008.

The following year he would lose to champion Nate Campbell.

Later in 2009, he challenged Joan Guzmán for the vacant IBF lightweight world title but the fight was ruled a draw, although many felt Funeka had won.

In 2010, Funeka fought Guzman for the same vacant title of their previous encounter. Because Guzman was 9 pounds above the lightweight limit, the title became only on line for Funeka. During the fight, the South African experienced a knockdown as well as being outpointed by Guzman who prevailed by majority decision. In the post-fight drug test, Funeka tested positive for hydrochlorothiazide, a diuretic banned by the Nevada State Athletic Commission (NSAC). To salvage him, Funeka's manager said the diuretic taken was given by a doctor who told them that it was not a banned substance. Nevertheless, the NSAC sentenced Funeka to a 9-month suspension as well making him pay a fine of $35,000. Funeka also had to return the bonus money he earned from Guzman's "overweight" penalty.

On 19 November 2011, Funeka defeated Zolani Marali by split decision to capture the vacant WBF light-welterweight title in Johannesburg. The two met in a rematch the following year, on 8 December 2012, where Marali defeated Funeka by unanimous decision to win the WBF title.

On 15 November 2014, Funeka defeated Russian-German boxer Roman Belaev in a controversial technical decision for the vacant IBO welterweight world title. The fight was stopped due to a cut above Belaev's right eye, with the judges scoring the bout 104-105, 104-105 and 109-100 in favor of Funeka.

On 10 December 2015, Funeka faced Australian Jeff Horn for the WBO Inter-Continental welterweight title in Auckland, New Zealand. He lost by technical knockout in the sixth round. The bout was a title eliminator for WBO world title held by Manny Pacquiao.

== Professional boxing record ==
54 fights	40 wins	11 losses
By knockout	32	3
By decision	8	8
Draws	3	

No.	Result	Record	Opponent	Method	Round, time	Date	Location	Notes
54	Loss	40–11–3	(Germany) Abass Baraou	TKO	5 (10), 2:52	May 4, 2019	Fraport Arena, Frankfurt, Hessen, Germany	
53	Win	40–10–3	(South Africa) Uyanda Nogogo	TKO	6 (8)	Mar 17, 2019	(South Africa) Orient Theatre, East London, Eastern Cape	
52	Loss	39–10–3	(Armenia) Gor Yeritsyan	UD	8	Jul 28, 2018	Galaktika Culture Centre, Estosadok, Russia	
51	Loss	39–9–3	(Russia) Islam Dumanov	UD	8	Apr 20, 2018	Pabellon Municipal, Sedavi, Comunidad Valenciana, Spain	
50	Loss	39–8–3	(Ukraine) Karen Chukhadzhyan	UD	8	Dec 16, 2017	Ice Palace "Terminal", Brovary, Ukraine	
49	Loss	39–7–3	(Colombia) Samuel Vargas	MD	10	Aug 19, 2017	(Canada) Powerade Centre, Brampton, Ontario	For WBA–NABA welterweight title
48	Loss	39–6–3	(Australia) Jeff Horn	TKO	6 (10), 0:30	Dec 10, 2016	Vector Arena, Auckland, New Zealand	For WBO Inter-Continental welterweight title
47	Win	39–5–3	(Ghana) Justice Addy	TKO	3 (12)	Jul 24, 2016	(South Africa) Queenstown, Eastern Cape	Won vacant WBO Africa welterweight title
46	Win	38–5–3	(Russia) Viskhan Murzabekov	SD	12	Mar 5, 2016	Colosseum Sport Hall, Grozny, Russia	
45	Win	37–5–3	(Ghana) Gideon Agbosu	TKO	4 (12)	Dec 18, 2015	(South Africa) Orient Theatre, East London, Eastern Cape	Won WBO Africa welterweight title
44	Loss	36–5–3	(South Africa) Tsiko Mulovhedzi	TKO	5 (12)	Jul 24, 2015	(South Africa) International Convention Centre, East London, Eastern Cape	Lost IBO welterweight title
43	Win	36–4–3	(Russia) Roman Belaev	TD	11 (12)	Nov 15, 2014	(South Africa) Emperors Palace, Kempton Park, Gauteng	Won vacant IBO welterweight title
42	Win	35–4–3	(South Africa) Botishepo Mandawe	TKO	8 (12), 1:10	Sep 21, 2014	(South Africa) Mdantsane Indoor Centre, Mdantsane, Eastern Cape	Retained South African super lightweight title
41	Win	34–4–3	(South Africa) Mzolisi Yoyo	KO	4 (12)	May 31, 2014	(South Africa) Orient Theatre, East London, Eastern Cape	Won South African super lightweight title
40	Win	33–4–3	(South Africa) Jason Bedeman	KO	1 (8)	Sep 30, 2013	(South Africa) Emperors Palace, Kempton Park, Gauteng	
39	Win	32–4–3	(South Africa) Vusi Dladla	KO	1 (8)	Jul 6, 2013	(South Africa) Orient Theatre, East London, Eastern Cape	
38	Loss	31–4–3	(South Africa) Zolani Marali	UD	12	Dec 8, 2012	(South Africa) Orient Theatre, East London, Eastern Cape	Lost WBF super lightweight title
37	Win	31–3–3	(South Africa) Zolani Marali	SD	12	Nov 19, 2011	(South Africa) Monte Casino, Johannesburg, Gauteng	Won vacant WBF super lightweight title
36	Loss	30–3–3	(Dominican Republic) Joan Guzmán	SD	12	Mar 27, 2010	(United States) Hard Rock Hotel and Casino, Paradise, Nevada	For vacant IBF lightweight title
35	Draw	30–2–3	(Dominican Republic) Joan Guzmán	MD	12	Nov 28, 2009	(Canada) Pepsi Coliseum, Quebec City	For vacant IBF lightweight title
34	Loss	30–2–2	(United States) Nate Campbell	MD	12	Feb 14, 2009	(United States) BankAtlantic Center, Sunrise, Florida	For WBA (Super), IBF, and WBO lightweight titles
33	Win	30–1–2	(United States) Zahir Raheem	KO	4 (12)	Jul 5, 2008	(South Africa) Jan Smuts Stadium, East London, Eastern Cape	
32	Win	29–1–2	(Philippines) JR Sollano	TKO	4 (12), 2:25	Sep 23, 2007	(South Africa) Orient Theatre, East London, Eastern Cape	Retained WBC International lightweight title
31	Win	28–1–2	(Ghana) Yakubu Amidu	MD	12	Apr 1, 2007	(South Africa) Orient Theatre, East London, Eastern Cape	Retained WBC International lightweight title
30	Win	27–1–2	(South Africa) Anthony Tshehla	KO	4 (12), 1:01	Oct 7, 2006	(South Africa) Orient Theatre, East London, Eastern Cape	Retained WBC International lightweight title
29	Win	26–1–2	(South Africa) Patrick Masango	TKO	5 (12), 2:46	Jul 22, 2006	(South Africa) Orient Theatre, East London, Eastern Cape	Retained South African super featherweight title
28	Win	25–1–2	(Philippines) Dexter Delada	KO	2 (12), 2:19	May 27, 2006	(South Africa) Orient Theatre, East London, Eastern Cape	Won vacant WBC International lightweight title
27	Win	24–1–2	(South Africa) Themba Tshicila	RTD	7 (12), 0:10	Dec 17, 2005	(South Africa) Orient Theatre, East London, Eastern Cape	Retained South African super featherweight title
26	Win	23–1–2	(South Africa) Gabriel Phakula	RTD	8 (12), 0:10	Aug 27, 2005	(South Africa) Orient Theatre, East London, Eastern Cape	Retained South African super featherweight title
25	Win	22–1–2	(South Africa) Danile Botman	TKO	2 (12), 2:35	Apr 30, 2005	(South Africa) Mdantsane Indoor Centre, Mdantsane, Eastern Cape	Retained South African super featherweight title
24	Win	21–1–2	(South Africa) Zukile Khandisa	KO	1 (12), 0:54	Oct 23, 2004	(South Africa) Orient Theatre, East London, Eastern Cape	Retained South African super featherweight title
23	Win	20–1–2	(South Africa) Elvis Makama	TKO	5 (12), 0:45	Jul 31, 2004	(South Africa) Orient Theatre, East London, Eastern Cape	Retained South African super featherweight title
22	Win	19–1–2	(South Africa) Gabriel Phakula	SD	12	Feb 21, 2004	(South Africa) Orient Theatre, East London, Eastern Cape	Won South African super featherweight title
21	Win	18–1–2	(South Africa) Vumile Mangqase	KO	1 (6)	Aug 2, 2013	(South Africa) Orient Theatre, East London, Eastern Cape	
20	Win	17–1–2	(South Africa) Sello Hanong	TKO	3 (6)	Jul 11, 2003	(South Africa) Carnival City, Brakpan, Gauteng	
19	Win	16–1–2	(South Africa) Dumisane Mofu	TKO	4 (8)	Apr 5, 2003	(South Africa) Orient Theatre, East London, Eastern Cape	
18	Win	15–1–2	(South Africa) Xola Ntengento	TKO	5 (8)	Dec 14, 2002	(South Africa) Mdantsane Indoor Centre, Mdantsane, Eastern Cape	
17	Loss	14–1–2	(South Africa) Mzonke Fana	MD	12	Jul 12, 2002	Oliver Thambo Hall, Khayelitsha, Cape Town, South Africa	For South African super featherweight title
16	Win	14–0–2	(South Africa) Mncedisi Kholiwe	TKO	1 (6)	Oct 28, 2001	(South Africa) Mdantsane Indoor Centre, Mdantsane, Eastern Cape	
15	Win	13–0–2	(South Africa) Luntu Giana	TKO	5 (–)	May 27, 2001	(South Africa) Mdantsane Indoor Centre, Mdantsane, Eastern Cape	
14	Win	12–0–2	(South Africa) Wiseman Yonana	TKO	1 (6)	Feb 25, 2001	(South Africa) Mdantsane Indoor Centre, Mdantsane, Eastern Cape	
13	Win	11–0–2	(South Africa) Siyathemba Xaka	KO	3 (6)	Oct 15, 2000	(South Africa) Mdantsane Indoor Centre, Mdantsane, Eastern Cape	
12	Win	10–0–2	(South Africa) Mzwanele Sam	PTS	6	May 14, 2000	(South Africa) Orient Theatre, East London, Eastern Cape	
11	Win	9–0–2	(South Africa) Xolani Jacobs	TKO	6 (6)	Oct 17, 1999	(South Africa) Centenary Hall, New Brighton, Port Elizabeth, Eastern Cape	
10	Win	8–0–2	(South Africa) Edward Mpofu	PTS	8	Aug 25, 1999	(South Africa) Graceland Hotel Casino, Secunda, Mpumalanga	
9	Win	7–0–2	(South Africa) Phumlani Menziwa	TKO	1 (8)	Aug 15, 1999	(South Africa) Gompo Hall, East London, Eastern Cape	
8	Win	6–0–2	(South Africa) Xolile Mchiza	KO	1 (6)	Jul 10, 1999	(South Africa) Needs Camp, East London, Eastern Cape	
7	Win	5–0–2	(South Africa) Thembinkosi Makwedinana	KO	1 (4)	Apr 18, 1999	(South Africa) Orient Theatre, East London, Eastern Cape	
6	Win	4–0–2	(South Africa) Phapama Danisa	KO	2 (6)	Mar 27, 1999	(South Africa) Mdantsane, Eastern Cape	
5	Win	3–0–2	(South Africa) Vulindela Mlenzana	KO	6 (6)	Aug 30, 1998	(South Africa) Orient Theatre, East London, Eastern Cape	
4	Win	2–0–2	(South Africa) Vuyani Jobo	TKO	2 (6)	Jun 1, 1997	(South Africa) Gompo Hall, East London, Eastern Cape	
3	Draw	1–0–2	(South Africa) Nkosinathi Ndela	PTS	4	Apr 27, 1997	(South Africa) Gompo Hall, East London, Eastern Cape	
2	Win	1–0–1	(South Africa) Anele Mqoboli	PTS	4	Oct 21, 1995	(South Africa) East London, Eastern Cape	
1	Draw	0–0–1	(South Africa) Simphiwe Xabendlini	PTS	4	Sep 24, 1995	(South Africa) Mdantsane Indoor Centre, Mdantsane, Eastern Cape	Professional debut
