= Kenichi Ogawa =

Japanese boxer (born 1988)

Personal information
- Nickname: Crush Right
- Born: 尾川堅一; February 1, 1988 (age 38) Toyohashi, Japan
- Height: 5 ft 8 in (173 cm)
- Weight: Super-featherweight

Boxing career
- Reach: 68 in (173 cm)
- Stance: Orthodox

Boxing record
- Total fights: 35
- Wins: 31
- Win by KO: 22
- Losses: 2
- Draws: 1
- No contests: 1

Kenichi Ogawa (尾川 堅一, Ogawa Ken'ichi; born February 1, 1988) is a Japanese professional boxer who held the International Boxing Federation (IBF) super-featherweight title from 2021 to 2022.

== Professional career ==
=== Early career ===
==== Rookie of the Year tournament ====
Ogawa made his professional debut against Chikashi Hayashizaki on April 30, 2010. He won the fight by a third-round technical knockout. Ogawa won two more fights before taking part in the East Japan rookie tournament: a fourth-round technical knockout of Galanter Saito on July 3, 2010, and a second-round technical knockout of Kan Irie on October 2, 2010.

After amassing a 3–0 record, Ogawa was scheduled to take part in the 2011 East Japan "Rookie of the Year" tournament. Ogawa faced Junya Nakada on August 2, 2011, in the tournament quarterfinals. He won the fight by a first-round knockout. Advancing to the tournament semifinals, Ogawa was scheduled to fight Jun Hamana on September 27, 2011. He won the fight by unanimous decision, with scores of 40–36, 40–37 and 40–37. Ogawa faced Kenta Ihara in the finals of the 2011 East Japan "Rookie of the Year" tournament, which was held on November 3, 2011. He won the fight by a second-round knockout. This victory earned Ogawa the right to face the winner of the West Japan rookie tournament, Ippo Nishiwaki, in the All Japan "Rookie of the Year" decider on December 18, 2011. He won the fight by unanimous decision, with all three judges scoring the fight 50–45 in his favor.

==== Rise up the ranks ====
Ogawa was next scheduled to face the journeyman Masashi Murase on April 16, 2012. He won the fight by a third-round technical knockout. Ogawa faced Yuki Miyoshi on August 4, 2012. Miyoshi handed Ogawa his first professional loss, winning the fight by a fifth-round technical knockout. Ogawa successfully bounced back from his first professional loss with a second-round technical knockout of Shunsuke Sato on June 1, 2013. Ogawa's second fight of 2013 was a quick first-round technical knockout of Yuki Miyoshi on November 2, 2013.

Ogawa fought three times in 2014. He first notched a second-round knockout of Yon Armed on March 1, 2014. He next fought Gabriel Royo on June 7, 2014, whom he beat by a fourth-round technical knockout. Ogawa finished the year with a seventh-round technical knockout of Ribo Takahata on October 22, 2014. Ogawa had three more fights in 2015 as well, before being booked to challenge for his first regional title. Ogawa first scored a third-round technical knockout of Kazuya Nakano on February 7, 2015. He next beat Raymond Sermona by a sixth-round knockout on June 6, 2015. Ogawa then beat Deivi Julio Bassa by tenth-round technical knockout on September 22, 2015.

=== Japanese super-featherweight champion ===
Ogawa challenged the reigning, undefeated Japanese super featherweight champion Rikki Naito on December 14, 2015, at the Korakuen Hall in Tokyo, Japan. The bout was scheduled as the co-main event of "Diamond Globe & DANGAN 148". Ogawa won the fight by technical decision, with scores of 49–46, 49–46 and 49–47. The fight was stopped in the fifth round, as Naito was unable to continue fighting due to a cut above his right eye, due to an accidental clash of heads.

Ogawa made his first title defense against the #1 ranked Japanese super featherweight Satoru Sugita. The fight was scheduled as co-headliner of the April 2, 2016, "548th Dynamic Gloves" event. He won the fight by a dominant ninth-round technical knockout. Ogawa dropped Sugita with a combination of a right straight and left hook, which left him badly staggered and forced his corner to throw in the towel.

Ogawa made his second title defense against the veteran Kento Matsushita on September 10, 2016, who was at the time the #1 ranked Japanese super featherweight. The bout was broadcast by G+. Ogawa won the fight by a tenth-round technical knockout. He knocked Matsushita down with a right uppercut near the end of the last round. Although Matsushita was able to beat the ten count, he was wobbly on his feet, which prompted the referee to wave the fight off.

Ogawa made his third title defense against Rikki Naito on December 3, 2016. He previously beat Naito on December 14, 2015, to win the title. Ogawa won the rematch by unanimous decision, with all three judges scoring the fight 96–94 for him. Ogawa made his fourth title defense against Satoru Sugita on March 2, 2017, in the co-main event of "World Premium Boxing 25: The REAL". The fight was a rematch of their April 2, 2016 bout, which Ogawa won by knockout. Ogawa won the fight by majority decision, with scores of 96–94, 97–93 and 95–95.

Ogawa was booked to make his fifth and final Japanese super featherweight title defense against Hirotsugu Yamamoto, in the main event of "552nd Dynamic Gloves" on July 1, 2017. He won the fight by a second-round technical knockout. Ogawa knocked Yamamoto with a left hook near the end of the first round, and continued to pressure in the second round, forcing Yamamoto's corner to throw in the towel at the 2:00 minute mark.

=== IBF super-featherweight champion ===
==== Ogawa vs. Farmer ====
On September 25, 2017, the IBF ordered Tevin Farmer and Ogawa to face each other for the vacant super featherweight title. Farmer was ranked #4 by the IBF at super featherweight. at the time. The two camps were given a thirty-day negotiation period to come to terms, before a purse bid would be called. They come to an agreement on October 12, 2017, therefore successfully avoiding a purse bid. The fight was officially announced for December 9, 2017, and was held at the Mandalay Bay Events Center in Paradise, Nevada. Ogawa won the closely contested bout by split decision. Two judges scored the fight 116–112 and 115–113 in his favor, while the third judge scored it 116–112 for Farmer.

On January 19, 2018, the NSAC announced that they had suspended Ogawa for a positive pre-fight test. Although his post-fight test turned up negative, both his A and B pre-fight samples tested positive for androstanediol, a type of synthetic testosterone. Following a three-month period of arbitration, the NSAC ruled that Ogawa had deliberately taken illegal substances to gain an advantage in his fight with Farmer. Accordingly, the NSAC suspended Ogawa for six months and fined him $14,000 (20% of his fight purse), while the IBF opted to strip him of his newly acquired title.

==== Second title run ====
Ogawa was booked to face Roldan Aldea on February 2, 2019, following a 14-month absence from the sport. He won the fight by unanimous decision, with scores of 97–93, 99–92 and 98–92. Ogawa next faced Glenn Medura on July 6, 2019. Medura retired from the fight at the end of the fourth round.

Ogawa challenged the WBO Asia Pacific super featherweight champion Joe Noynay, who was at the time the #6 ranked WBO super featherweight contender, on December 7, 2019. The fight was ruled as split draw by technical decision, with scores of 49–46, 47–48 and 48–48. The pair both suffered cuts above the left eye after an accidental head clash in the first round. The damage was exacerbated by a second clash of heads in the fifth round, which left Noynay unable to compete, forcing the referee to stop the fight. Ogawa bounced back from this minor setback with a unanimous decision victory against Kazuhiro Nishitani on October 2, 2020.

==== Ogawa vs. Fuzile ====
On August 4, 2021, it was revealed that Ogawa would face the one-time IBF super featherweight title challenger Shavkat Rakhimov for the vacant IBF super featherweight title. The fight was expected to take place on August 20, 2021, at the Conrad Dubai in Dubai, United Arab Emirates. On August 11, Rakhimov announced that he had withdrawn from the bout due to an injury. As Rakhimov appeared unable to make a quick recovery from his injury, Ogawa's camp instead entered into negotiations with Azinga Fuzile. Fuzile was ranked #2 by the IBF at super featherweight. On October 30, 2021, promoter Eddie Hearn revealed that the pair had come to terms, and that the fight would take place on November 27, 2021, on the undercard of the Teófimo López vs. George Kambosos Jr. unified lightweight title bout.

Ogawa dropped Fuzile three times, en route to winning the title by unanimous decision. Two of the judges scored the fight 115–110 for Ogawa, while the third judge scored it 114–111 in his favor. Ogawa scored the first knockdown in round five, as he floored Fuzile with a right straight. Ogawa knocked Fuzile down a further two times in the twelfth round, although he was unable to finish him.

==== Ogawa vs. Cordina ====
Ogawa was booked to make his first IBF super featherweight title defense against the #3 ranked IBF contender Joe Cordina. The title bout is scheduled as the main event of a DAZN broadcast card, which will on take place June 4, 2022, at the Motorpoint Arena in Cordina's native Cardiff, Wales. Ogawa didn't enter first title defense as a favorite, with most odds-makers having him a +134 underdog to retain. Ogawa lost the fight by a second-round knockout, as Cordina floored him with a right cross at the 1:15 minute mark of the round. It was both the second loss and the second stoppage loss of Ogawa's professional career.

=== Lightweight ===
Ogawa faced Kaewfah Tor Buamas in the main event of "WHO'S NEXT DYNAMIC GLOVE on U-NEXT" on April 1, 2023. He won the fight by a fifth-round technical knockout.

== Professional boxing record ==
| 35 fights | 31 wins | 2 losses |
|---|---|---|
| By knockout | 22 | 2 |
| By decision | 9 | 0 |
| Draws | 1 | |
| No contests | 1 | |

| No. | Result | Record | Opponent | Type | Round, time | Date | Location | Notes |
|---|---|---|---|---|---|---|---|---|
| 35 | Win | 31–2–1 (1) | Presco Carcosia | KO | 5 (10), 2:00 | Nov 1, 2025 | Korakuen Hall, Tokyo, Japan | |
| 34 | Win | 30–2–1 (1) | Melchor Roda | RTD | 5 (10), 3:00 | Apr 5, 2025 | Korakuen Hall, Tokyo, Japan | |
| 33 | Win | 29–2–1 (1) | Alan Alberca | KO | 4 (8), 1:04 | Oct 5, 2024 | Korakuen Hall, Tokyo, Japan | |
| 32 | Win | 28–2–1 (1) | Marvin Esquierdo | UD | 10 | Sep 2, 2023 | Korakuen Hall, Tokyo, Japan | |
| 31 | Win | 27–2–1 (1) | Kaewfah Tor Buamas | TKO | 5 (10), 2:39 | Apr 1, 2023 | Korakuen Hall, Tokyo, Japan | |
| 30 | Loss | 26–2–1 (1) | Joe Cordina | KO | 2 (12) 1:15 | Jun 4, 2022 | Motorpoint Arena, Cardiff, Wales | Lost IBF super-featherweight title |
| 29 | Win | 26–1–1 (1) | Azinga Fuzile | UD | 12 | Nov 27, 2021 | Hulu Theater, New York City, New York, US | Won vacant IBF super-featherweight title |
| 28 | Win | 25–1–1 (1) | Kazuhiro Nishitani | UD | 10 | Oct 2, 2020 | Korakuen Hall, Tokyo, Japan | |
| 27 | Draw | 24–1–1 (1) | Joe Noynay | TD | 5 (12), 2:07 | Dec 7, 2019 | Korakuen Hall, Tokyo, Japan | For WBO Asia Pacific super-featherweight title |
| 26 | Win | 24–1 (1) | Glenn Medura | RTD | 4 (10), 3:00 | Jul 6, 2019 | Korakuen Hall, Tokyo, Japan | |
| 25 | Win | 23–1 (1) | Roldan Aldea | UD | 10 | Feb 2, 2019 | Korakuen Hall, Tokyo, Japan | |
| 24 | NC | 22–1 (1) | Tevin Farmer | NC | 12 | Dec 9, 2017 | Mandalay Bay Events Center, Paradise, Nevada, US | Vacant IBF super-featherweight title at stake; Originally an SD win for Ogawa, later ruled an NC after he failed a drug test |
| 23 | Win | 22–1 | Hirotsugu Yamamoto | TKO | 2 (10), 2:00 | Jul 1, 2017 | Korakuen Hall, Tokyo, Japan | Retained Japanese super-featherweight title |
| 22 | Win | 21–1 | Satoru Sugita | MD | 10 | Mar 2, 2017 | Ryōgoku Kokugikan, Tokyo, Japan | Retained Japanese super-featherweight title |
| 21 | Win | 20–1 | Rikki Naito | UD | 10 | Dec 3, 2016 | Korakuen Hall, Tokyo, Japan | Retained Japanese super-featherweight title |
| 20 | Win | 19–1 | Kento Matsushita | TKO | 10 (10) | Sep 10, 2016 | Korakuen Hall, Tokyo, Japan | Retained Japanese super-featherweight title |
| 19 | Win | 18–1 | Satoru Sugita | KO | 9 (10), 1:36 | Apr 2, 2016 | Korakuen Hall, Tokyo, Japan | Retained Japanese super-featherweight title |
| 18 | Win | 17–1 | Rikki Naito | TD | 5 (10), 2:28 | Dec 14, 2015 | Korakuen Hall, Tokyo, Japan | Won Japanese super-featherweight title |
| 17 | Win | 16–1 | Deivi Julio Bassa | TKO | 10 (10), 2:32 | Sep 22, 2015 | Ota City General Gymnasium, Tokyo, Japan | |
| 16 | Win | 15–1 | Raymond Sermona | KO | 6 (8), 0:59 | Jun 6, 2015 | Korakuen Hall, Tokyo, Japan | |
| 15 | Win | 14–1 | Kazuya Nakano | TKO | 3 (8), 0:51 | Feb 7, 2015 | Korakuen Hall, Tokyo, Japan | |
| 14 | Win | 13–1 | Ribo Takahata | TKO | 7 (8), 0:44 | Oct 22, 2014 | Yoyogi National Gymnasium, Tokyo, Japan | |
| 13 | Win | 12–1 | Gabriel Royo | TKO | 4 (8), 0:38 | Jun 7, 2014 | Korakuen Hall, Tokyo, Japan | |
| 12 | Win | 11–1 | Yon Armed | KO | 2 (8), 1:00 | Mar 1, 2014 | Korakuen Hall, Tokyo, Japan | |
| 11 | Win | 10–1 | Yuki Miyoshi | TKO | 1 (8), 2:14 | Nov 2, 2013 | Korakuen Hall, Tokyo, Japan | |
| 10 | Win | 9–1 | Shunsuke Sato | TKO | 2 (8), 2:44 | Jun 1, 2013 | Korakuen Hall, Tokyo, Japan | |
| 9 | Loss | 8–1 | Yuki Miyoshi | TKO | 5 (8), 0:11 | Aug 4, 2012 | Korakuen Hall, Tokyo, Japan | |
| 8 | Win | 8–0 | Masashi Murase | TKO | 3 (6), 2:17 | Apr 16, 2012 | Korakuen Hall, Tokyo, Japan | |
| 7 | Win | 7–0 | Ippo Nishiwaki | UD | 5 | Dec 18, 2011 | Korakuen Hall, Tokyo, Japan | |
| 6 | Win | 6–0 | Kenta Ihara | KO | 2 (5), 2:00 | Nov 3, 2011 | Korakuen Hall, Tokyo, Japan | |
| 5 | Win | 5–0 | Jun Hamana | UD | 4 | Sep 27, 2011 | Korakuen Hall, Tokyo, Japan | |
| 4 | Win | 4–0 | Junya Nakada | KO | 1 (4), 2:26 | Aug 2, 2011 | Korakuen Hall, Tokyo, Japan | |
| 3 | Win | 3–0 | Kan Irie | TKO | 2 (4), 2:55 | Oct 2, 2010 | Korakuen Hall, Tokyo, Japan | |
| 2 | Win | 2–0 | Galanter Saito | TKO | 4 (4), 1:19 | Jul 3, 2010 | Korakuen Hall, Tokyo, Japan | |
| 1 | Win | 1–0 | Chikashi Hayashizaki | TKO | 3 (4), 2:35 | Apr 30, 2010 | Nippon Budokan, Tokyo, Japan | |

== See also ==
- List of world super-featherweight boxing champions
- List of Japanese boxing world champions
- Boxing in Japan

Sporting positions
Regional boxing titles
| Preceded by Rikki Naito | Japanese super-featherweight champion November 14, 2015 – August 31, 2017; Vacated | Vacant Title next held by Masaru Sueyoshi |
World boxing titles
| Vacant Title last held by Joseph Diaz | IBF super-featherweight champion November 27, 2021 – June 4, 2022 | Succeeded by Joe Cordina |
