= Gairy St. Clair =

Guyanese boxer (born 1975)

Personal information
- Nickname: Superman
- Nationality: Australian
- Born: 2 February 1975 (age 51) Georgetown, Guyana
- Height: 5 ft 4 in (163 cm)
- Weight: Featherweight; Super featherweight; Lightweight; Light welterweight; Welterweight

Boxing career
- Reach: 65 in (165 cm)
- Stance: Orthodox

Boxing record
- Total fights: 60
- Wins: 45
- Win by KO: 18
- Losses: 13
- Draws: 2
Medal record
Men's Boxing
Representing Guyana
Central American and Caribbean Games
Bronze medal – third place	1993 Ponce	Bantamweight

Gairy St. Clair (born 2 February 1975 in Georgetown, Guyana) is a professional boxer in the junior lightweight (130 lb) division. He is the former IBF world junior-lightweight champion.

== Professional career ==
St Clair turned professional in 1994 in his hometown of Georgetown, Guyana. He went undefeated in 16 bouts with 15 wins and 1 draw before losing a unanimous decision to a then undefeated Diego Corrales. On 29 July 2006 Gairy challenged Cassius Baloyi for the IBO and IBF super-featherweight titles. Gairy became world champion winning by a unanimous decision with judges scoring the bout: 116–112 | 115–113 | 115–114. Gairy however lost the titles in a massive upset to Malcolm Klassen a few months later.

On 2 February 2008, he challenged Commonwealth Lightweight champion Amir Khan in the ExCel arena in London, losing after 12 rounds by unanimous points decision 120–108, scored for Khan by all three judges. Although he lost all 12 rounds fought on the scorecard, St Clair managed to hold a steady fight against Khan and kept his composure despite having to deal with Khan's trademark lightning-quick jabs.

== Professional boxing record ==
60 fights	45 wins	13 losses
By knockout	18	1
By decision	27	12
Draws	2	

No.	Result	Record	Opponent	Type	Round, time	Date	Location	Notes
60	Loss	45–13–2	Michael Hall	MD	12 (12)	2023-07-28	Conca D'Oro, Riverwood, Australia	
59	Win	45–12–2	Roberto Oyan	UD	10 (10)	2013-06-29	Richmond Club, Richmond, Australia	
58	Win	44–12–2	Roberto Oyan	UD	6 (6)	2013-05-17	Richmond Club, Richmond, Australia	
57	Win	43–12–2	Joel De la Cruz	UD	10 (10)	2012-10-20	Windsor Function Centre, Windsor, Australia	
56	Win	42–12–2	Rey Anton Olarte	UD	8 (8)	2012-08-31	Entertainment Centre, Hurstville, Australia	
55	Loss	41–12–2	Lovemore N'dou	UD	12 (12)	2012-08-10	Southport Sharks AFL Club, Southport, Australia	For vacant World Boxing Foundation welterweight title
54	Loss	41–11–2	Ryan Waters	UD	12 (12)	2011-03-25	Cronulla Sutherland Leagues Club, Cronulla, Australia	
53	Win	41–10–2	Moses Seran	UD	6 (6)	2009-12-11	Roundhouse, Kensington, Australia	
52	Loss	40–10–2	Jackson Asiku	TKO	9 (12)	2009-04-26	Challenge Stadium, Perth, Australia	For vacant IBF Australasian featherweight title
51	Loss	40–9–2	Lenny Zappavigna	UD	12 (12)	2009-03-11	The Cube, Campbelltown, Australia	For IBF Pan Pacific light-welterweight title
50	Loss	40–8–2	Mlungisi Dlamini	UD	12 (12)	2008-11-14	Ride Hall, Parys, South Africa	For World Boxing Foundation lightweight title
49	Win	40–7–2	Junmar Dulog	KO	2 (6)	2008-10-31	Entertainment Centre, Shoalhaven Heads, Australia	
48	Loss	39–7–2	William Kickett	UD	10 (10)	2008-06-24	Hisense Arena, Melbourne, Australia	
47	Win	39–6–2	Jun Paderna	MD	6 (6)	2008-04-11	Cronulla Sutherland Leagues Club, Cronulla, Australia	
46	Loss	38–6–2	Amir Khan	UD	12 (12)	2008-02-02	ExCel Arena, London, England, U.K.	For Commonwealth lightweight title
45	Win	38–5–2	Roberto Oyan	UD	6 (6)	2007-12-07	Wyong RSL Club, Wyong, Australia	
44	Loss	37–5–2	Cassius Baloyi	UD	12 (12)	2007-11-12	Emperors Palace, Kempton Park, South Africa	
43	Loss	37–4–2	Malcolm Klassen	SD	12 (12)	2006-11-04	Emperors Palace, Kempton Park, South Africa	Lost IBF super-featherweight title
42	Win	37–3–2	Cassius Baloyi	UD	12 (12)	2006-07-29	Emperors Palace, Kempton Park, South Africa	Won IBF & IBO super-featherweight titles
41	Win	36–3–2	Chawan Darsi	TKO	4 (10)	2005-07-03	Challenge Stadium, Perth, Australia	
40	Win	35–3–2	Shamir Reyes	TKO	12 (12)	2005-02-24	Hellenic Community Centre, Northbridge, Australia	Retained WBO Inter-Continental featherweight title
39	Win	34–3–2	Theophilus Quaye	TKO	11 (12)	2004-10-01	Southport Sharks AFL Club, Southport, Australia	Retained WBO Inter-Continental featherweight title
38	Win	33–3–2	Decha Kokietgym	UD	12 (12)	2004-08-27	Panthers World of Entertainment, Penrith, Australia	Won vacant WBO Inter-Continental featherweight title
37	Win	32–3–2	Anukun Kulamun	UD	10 (10)	2004-07-30	Herb Graham Recreation Centre, Mirrabooka, Australia	
36	Win	31–3–2	Bart Abapo	TKO	6 (12)	2004-07-17	State Sports Centre, Homebush Bay, Australia	
35	Win	30–3–2	Cristian Sebastian Paz	UD	10 (10)	2004-04-02	State Sports Centre, Homebush Bay, Australia	
34	Win	29–3–2	Johnny Sheferaw	UD	6 (6)	2004-01-23	Panthers World of Entertainment, Penrith, Australia	
33	Win	28–3–2	Jackson Asiku	UD	8 (8)	2003-12-12	Badgery's Pavilion, Homebush Bay, Australia	
32	Win	27–3–2	Donny Suratin	UD	8 (8)	2003-10-03	Badgery's Pavilion, Homebush Bay, Australia	
31	Win	26–3–2	Untung Ortega	TKO	4 (8)	2003-08-08	Panthers World of Entertainment, Penrith, Australia	
30	Win	25–3–2	Kongthawat Sor Kitti	UD	8 (8)	2003-06-13	Auburn RSL Club, Auburn, Australia	
29	Win	24–3–2	Rio Saragih	TKO	1 (8)	2003-01-19	Telstra Superdome, Melbourne, Australia	
28	Draw	23–3–2	James Swan	SD	10 (10)	2002-11-09	Challenge Stadium, Perth, Australia	
27	Win	23–3–1	Shane Braslin	KO	3 (8)	2002-08-02	Le Montage Function Centre, Sydney, Australia	
26	Win	22–3–1	James Swan	TKO	12 (12)	2002-04-19	Le Montage Function Centre, Sydney, Australia	Won vacant IBF Pan Pacific super-featherweight title
25	Win	21–3–1	Phongsak Phaor	UD	8 (8)	2002-02-08	Le Montage Function Centre, Sydney, Australia	
24	Win	20–3–1	Kongthawat Sor Kitti	TKO	10 (10)	2001-11-16	Nineveh Sports Club, Sydney, Australia	
23	Win	19–3–1	Sebua Mendocino	UD	8 (8)	2001-10-26	Nineveh Sports Club, Sydney, Australia	
22	Win	18–3–1	Danny McGrail	TKO	6 (8)	2001-08-17	The Octagon, Sydney, Australia	
21	Win	17–3–1	Sebua Mendocino	PTS	6 (6)	2001-08-03	The Bellevue Venue, Sydney, Australia	
20	Loss	16–3–1	Leonard Doroftei	UD	10 (10)	2000-09-08	Molson Centre, Montreal, Quebec, Canada	
19	Loss	16–2–1	Vivian Harris	UD	10 (10)	1999-12-10	The Blue Horizon, Philadelphia, Pennsylvania, U.S.	
18	Win	16–1–1	Alric Johnson	PTS	10 (10)	1999-04-21	Georgetown, Guyana	
17	Win	15–1–1	Vincent Howard	PTS	12 (12)	1999-02-19	Georgetown, Guyana	Won vacant Guyanese super-featherweight title
16	Loss	14–1–1	Diego Corrales	UD	12 (12)	1998-12-18	Yosemite Hall, Sacramento, California, U.S.	
15	Win	14–0–1	Manuel Santiago	PTS	8 (8)	1998-05-29	McAfee, New Jersey, U.S.	
14	Draw	13–0–1	Bernard Harris	PTS	10 (10)	1998-04-11	Township Auditorium, Columbia, South Carolina, U.S.	
13	Win	13–0	Joseph Figueroa	PTS	8 (8)	1997-12-09	Holiday Inn, Worcester, Massachusetts, U.S.	
12	Win	12–0	Jose Nino Diaz	TKO	4 (10)	1997-07-06	Cliff Anderson Sports Hall, Georgetown, Guyana	
11	Win	11–0	Rolando Valcarcel	TKO	3 (6)	1997-06-07	Mahi Temple Shrine Auditorium, Miami, Florida, U.S.	
10	Win	10–0	Frederick Suswell	TKO	3 (6)	1997-04-11	Ukrainian Cultural Center, Somerset, New Jersey, U.S.	
9	Win	9–0	Francisco Pena	UD	8 (8)	1997-02-28	Cliff Anderson Sports Hall, Georgetown, Guyana	
8	Win	8–0	Malcolm Lowery	TKO	1 (?)	1996-11-15	Ukrainian Cultural Center, Somerset, New Jersey, U.S.	
7	Win	7–0	Edwin Ruiz	PTS	6 (6)	1996-09-27	Tropicana Hotel & Casino, Atlantic City, New Jersey, U.S.	
6	Win	6–0	Forbes David	TKO	4 (4)	1996-09-10	Beacon Theatre, New York City, New York, U.S.	
5	Win	5–0	Lionel Odom	PTS	6 (6)	1996-08-16	Yonkers Raceway, Yonkers, New York, U.S.	
4	Win	4–0	Errol Trotmann	TKO	2 (6)	1995-12-03	Pegasus Hotel, Georgetown, Guyana	
3	Win	3–0	Courtney Younge	TKO	2 (?)	1995-02-25	National Sports Hall, Georgetown, Guyana	
2	Win	2–0	Linden Arthur	PTS	4 (4)	1994-12-11	National Sports Hall, Georgetown, Guyana	
1	Win	1–0	Nigel Boston	PTS	4 (4)	1994-10-16	National Sports Hall, Georgetown, Guyana	

== Later life ==
Superman was Inducted into the Australian National Boxing Hall Of Fame at the Crown Hotel and Casino in Melbourne on the 26th of August 2022.

In 2023, St. Clair avoided jail time for assaulting a chemist security guard during a dispute about the placement of his Covid face mask. He was represented by former foe Lovemore N'dou, who successfully argued that St. Clair's was under great stress at the time of the incident because his business, the Gairy St Clair Boxing Fitness Gym, had been severely impacted by Covid.

== See also ==
- List of world super-featherweight boxing champions

Sporting positions
Regional boxing titles
New title	Guyanese super-featherweight champion 19 February 1999 – 2001; Vacated	Vacant Title next held by Hugo Lewis
Vacant Title last held by Robbie Peden	IBF Pan Pacific super-featherweight champion 19 April 2002 – 2003; Vacated	Vacant Title next held by Nedal Hussein
Vacant Title last held by Tiger Smalls	WBO Inter-Continental featherweight champion 27 August 2004 – 2005; Vacated	Vacant Title next held by András Mészáros
Minor world boxing titles
Preceded by Cassius Baloyi	IBO super-featherweight champion 29 July 2006 – 2006; Vacated	Vacant Title next held by Cassius Baloyi
Major world boxing titles
Preceded by Cassius Baloyi	IBF super-featherweight champion 29 July 2006 – 4 November 2006	Succeeded by Malcolm Klassen
