= Azinga Fuzile =

South African boxer

Personal information
- Nickname: Golden Boy
- Nationality: South African
- Born: 23 July 1996 (age 29) Eastern Cape, South Africa
- Height: 5 ft 7 in (170 cm)
- Weight: Featherweight; Super featherweight

Boxing career
- Reach: 70 in (178 cm)
- Stance: Southpaw

Boxing record
- Total fights: 19
- Wins: 17
- Win by KO: 11
- Losses: 2

Azinga Fuzile (born 23 July 1996) is a South African professional boxer who challenged once for the IBF super featherweight title in 2021.

== Professional career ==
Fuzile challenged Kenichi Ogawa for the vacant IBF super featherweight title on November 27, 2021 in New York, but lost the fight by unanimous decision.

Fuzile is scheduled to face Sultan Zaurbek in Astana, Kazakhstan on April 5, 2025.

== Professional boxing record ==
17 fights	15 wins	2 losses
By knockout	9	1
By decision	6	1

No.	Result	Record	Opponent	Type	Round, time	Date	Location	Notes
17	Loss	15–2	(Japan) Kenichi Ogawa	UD	12	27 Nov 2021	(United States) Madison Square Garden Theater, New York City, New York, U.S.	For vacant IBF super featherweight title
16	Win	15–1	(United Kingdom) Martin Joseph Ward	TKO	7 (12) 2:55	29 May 2021	(United States) Michelob Ultra Arena, Paradise, Nevada, U.S.	
15	Loss	14–1	(Tajikistan) Shavkat Rakhimov	TKO	8 (12), 2:26	29 Sep 2019	Orient Theatre, East London, South Africa	
14	Win	14–0	(Mexico) Romulo Koasicha	UD	12	7 Apr 2019	Nangoza Jebe Hall, Port Elizabeth, South Africa	Retained IBF Inter-Continental super featherweight title
13	Win	13–0	(Tanzania) Ibrahim Mgender	KO	7 (12), 2:59	9 Dec 2018	Orient Theatre, East London, South Africa	Won vacant IBF Inter-Continental super featherweight title
12	Win	12–0	(South Africa) Malcolm Klassen	TKO	4 (12), 2:58	21 Oct 2018	Orient Theatre, East London, South Africa	Retained IBF Continental Africa super featherweight title
11	Win	11–0	(Nigeria) Waidi Usman	KO	7 (12), 1:11	29 Jul 2018	Orient Theatre, East London, South Africa	Won vacant IBF Continental Africa super featherweight title
10	Win	10–0	(Namibia) Immanuel Andeleki	KO	1 (10), 0:22	8 Apr 2018	Orient Theatre, East London, South Africa	
9	Win	9–0	(South Africa) Tshifhiwa Munyai	TKO	3 (10), 2:41	21 Oct 2017	Emperors Palace, Kempton Park, South Africa	
8	Win	8–0	(South Africa) Rofhiwa Maemu	UD	12	30 Jul 2017	Orient Theatre, East London, South Africa	Retained South African featherweight title
7	Win	7–0	(South Africa) Sydney Maluleka	UD	12	7 May 2017	Orient Theatre, East London, South Africa	Won vacant IBF Intercontinental Africa featherweight title; Retained South Africa featherweight title
6	Win	6–0	(Georgia (country)) Giorgi Gotchoshvili	KO	1 (12), 1:42	19 Dec 2016	Mdantsane Indoor Centre, East London, South Africa	Won vacant interim WBC Youth featherweight title
5	Win	5–0	(South Africa) Macbute Sinyabi	UD	12	30 Sep 2016	Orient Theatre, East London, South Africa	Won South African featherweight title
4	Win	4–0	(South Africa) Aphiwa Kelewe	TKO	8 (8), 2:09	23 Apr 2016	Mdantsane Indoor Centre, Mdantsane, South Africa	
3	Win	3–0	(South Africa) Paul Mangxilana	TKO	2 (10), 2:33	10 Oct 2015	Orient Theatre, East London, South Africa	
2	Win	2–0	(South Africa) Tumelo Pedi	PTS	6	7 Mar 2015	Indoor Sports Centre, Mdantsane, South Africa	
1	Win	1–0	(South Africa) Sibusiso Khumalo	PTS	6	25 Dec 2014	Orient Theatre, East London, South Africa	
