= Cassius Baloyi =

South African boxer

Personal information
- Nicknames: The Hit Man; Mr. Shy Guy
- Born: 5 November 1974 (age 51) Malamulele, Limpopo, South Africa
- Height: 5 ft 10 in (178 cm)
- Weight: Super bantamweight; Featherweight; Super featherweight; Lightweight

Boxing career
- Reach: 75 in (191 cm)
- Stance: Orthodox

Boxing record
- Total fights: 46
- Wins: 37
- Win by KO: 19
- Losses: 8
- Draws: 1

Cassius Baloyi (born 5 November 1974) is a retired professional boxer. He held the IBF super featherweight title twice between 2006 and 2009.

== Professional career ==
Known as "Mr. Shy Guy", Baloyi turned pro in 1994 and captured the Vacant IBF Super Featherweight Title in 2006 with a TKO win over Manuel Medina. He lost the title in his first defense to Gairy St Clair later in the year, but regained the title by defeating compatriot Mzonke Fana on 12 April 2008. His most recent defense in September 2008 was against Javier Osvaldo Alvarez, whom he knocked down three times on the way to a TKO victory. On 12 April 2008, Baloyi lost his title to Malcolm Klassen when the referee stopped the fight during the seventh round after Klassen overpowered Baloyi. After the fight it was reported that Baloyi was disappointed with his trainer. Baloyi has retired from professional boxing and is now a Pro and Amateur boxing coach in Johannesburg.

Baloyi is the only South African to ever win six World Titles. Baloyi was named "Boxer of the Year" for 2008 at the Boxing SA Annual Awards at a banquet held at Carnival City in Brakpan.

== Professional boxing record ==
46 fights	37 wins	8 losses
By knockout	19	1
By decision	18	7
Draws	1	

No.	Result	Record	Opponent	Type	Round, time	Date	Location	Notes
46	Loss	37–8–1	Malcolm Klassen	UD	8	14 Oct 2012	Nasrec Indoor Arena, Johannesburg, South Africa	
45	Loss	37–7–1	Paulus Moses	SD	10	28 Jul 2012	Ramatex Factory, Windhoek, Namibia	For vacant WBO International lightweight title
44	Loss	37–6–1	Argenis Mendez	UD	12	29 Jan 2011	Carnival City, Brakpan, South Africa	
43	Loss	37–5–1	Mzonke Fana	UD	12	1 Sep 2010	Carnival City, Brakpan, South Africa	For vacant IBF super-featherweight title
42	Win	37–4–1	Roberto David Arrieta	UD	12	30 Oct 2009	Wembley Indoor Arena, Johannesburg, South Africa	
41	Loss	36–4–1	Malcolm Klassen	TKO	7 (12), 2:42	18 Apr 2009	North-West University Sports Complex, Mafikeng, South Africa	Lost IBF super-featherweight title
40	Win	36–3–1	Javier Osvaldo Alvarez	TKO	3 (12), 0:28	13 Sep 2008	Emperors Palace, Kempton Park, South Africa	Retained IBF super-featherweight title
39	Win	35–3–1	Mzonke Fana	MD	12	12 Apr 2008	North-West University Sports Complex, Mafikeng, South Africa	Won IBF super-featherweight title
38	Win	34–3–1	Gairy St. Clair	UD	12	12 Nov 2007	Emperors Palace, Kempton Park, South Africa	
37	Draw	33–3–1	Manuel Medina	TD	4 (12)	5 Jul 2007	Emperors Palace, Kempton Park, South Africa	
36	Win	33–3	Nazareno Gaston Ruiz	TKO	3 (12), 1:06	3 Feb 2007	Emperors Palace, Kempton Park, South Africa	Won vacant IBO super-featherweight title
35	Loss	32–3	Gairy St. Clair	UD	12	29 Jul 2006	Emperors Palace, Kempton Park, South Africa	Lost IBF & IBO super-featherweight titles
34	Win	32–2	Manuel Medina	TKO	11 (12), 2:19	31 May 2006	Northern Quest Resort & Casino, Airway Heights, Washington, U.S.	Retained IBO super-featherweight title; Won vacant IBF super-featherweight title
33	Loss	31–2	Isaac Hlatshwayo	UD	12	31 Aug 2005	Carnival City, Brakpan, South Africa	For vacant IBO lightweight title
32	Win	31–1	Lehlo Ledwaba	UD	12	16 Apr 2005	Carnival City, Brakpan, South Africa	Retained IBO super-featherweight title
31	Win	30–1	Lehlo Ledwaba	UD	12	20 Nov 2004	Carnival City, Brakpan, South Africa	Retained IBO super-featherweight title
30	Win	29–1	Juan Gerardo Cabrera	UD	12	27 Mar 2004	Carousel Casino, Hammanskraal, South Africa	Retained IBO super-featherweight title
29	Win	28–1	Mbulelo Botile	TKO	11 (12), 2:58	26 Oct 2002	Carnival City, Brakpan, South Africa	Retained IBO super-featherweight title
28	Win	27–1	Tiger Ari	TKO	6 (12), 1:22	17 Apr 2002	Carnival City, Brakpan, South Africa	Won vacant IBO super-featherweight title
27	Loss	26–1	Phillip N'dou	UD	12	3 Nov 2001	Carnival City, Brakpan, South Africa	For WBU super-featherweight title
26	Win	26–0	Jorge Antonio Paredes	TKO	7 (12)	22 Aug 2001	Carousel Casino, Hammanskraal, South Africa	Retained WBU featherweight title
25	Win	25–0	Steve Robinson	MD	12	3 Nov 2000	Leisure Centre, Ebbw Vale, Wales, U.K.	Retained WBU featherweight title
24	Win	24–0	Baudilio Hernandez	KO	1 (12)	1 Sep 2000	Carnival City, Brakpan, South Africa	Retained WBU featherweight title
23	Win	23–0	Héctor Lizárraga	KO	1 (12), 2:59	24 May 2000	Carnival City, Brakpan, South Africa	Retained WBU featherweight title
22	Win	22–0	Brian Carr	TKO	10 (12)	26 Jun 1999	Kelvin Hall, Glasgow, Scotland, U.K.	Retained WBU featherweight title
21	Win	21–0	Said Lawal	RTD	8 (12), 3:00	1 Apr 1999	Aston Villa Leisure Centre, Birmingham, England, U.K.	Retained WBU featherweight title
20	Win	20–0	Domingo Damigella	TKO	10 (12), 2:47	12 Sep 1998	Martz Hall, Pottsville, Pennsylvania, U.S.	Retained WBU featherweight title
19	Win	19–0	Sergio Rafael Liendo	UD	12	24 Apr 1998	San Jose Arena, San Jose, California, U.S.	Won vacant WBU featherweight title
18	Win	18–0	László Bognár	TKO	7 (12), 2:16	15 Nov 1997	Carousel Casino, Hammanskraal, South Africa	Retained WBU super-bantamweight title
17	Win	17–0	Jose de Jesus Garcia	TKO	2 (12), 2:32	28 Jun 1997	Nasrec Indoor Arena, Johannesburg, South Africa	Retained WBU super-bantamweight title
16	Win	16–0	Anton Gilmore	UD	12	22 Mar 1997	Wembley Indoor Arena, Johannesburg, South Africa	Retained WBU super-bantamweight title
15	Win	15–0	Frank Toledo	UD	12	15 Nov 1996	The Coliseum, St. Petersburg, Florida, U.S.	Won WBU super-bantamweight title
14	Win	14–0	Kororo Goduka	TKO	3 (10)	10 Sep 1996	Carousel Casino, Hammanskraal, South Africa	
13	Win	13–0	Peter Harris	PTS	6	6 Jul 1996	Nynex Arena, Manchester, England, U.K.	
12	Win	12–0	Peter Judson	PTS	6	16 Mar 1996	SEC Centre, Glasgow, Scotland, U.K.	
11	Win	11–0	Sipho Kahlane	TKO	2 (8)	30 Jan 1996	Carousel Casino, Hammanskraal, South Africa	
10	Win	10–0	Luvuyo Mdiniso	UD	8	28 Nov 1995	Carousel Casino, Hammanskraal, South Africa	
9	Win	9–0	Robert Kgaswe	TKO	2 (6)	4 Nov 1995	Superbowl, Sun City, South Africa	
8	Win	8–0	Edward Dlamini	PTS	6	19 Aug 1995	Superbowl, Sun City, South Africa	
7	Win	7–0	Reinhold Campa	UD	8	25 Apr 1995	Carousel Casino, Hammanskraal, South Africa	
6	Win	6–0	Hendrick Makolane	TKO	3 (6)	28 Feb 1995	Carousel Casino, Hammanskraal, South Africa	
5	Win	5–0	James McCloskey	TKO	3 (6)	25 Jan 1995	Trump Taj Mahal, Atlantic City, New Jersey, U.S.	
4	Win	4–0	Kobus Buys	TKO	4 (6)	6 Dec 1994	Carousel Casino, Hammanskraal, South Africa	
3	Win	3–0	Jose Maria Castillo	UD	4	1 Nov 1994	MGM Grand Garden Arena, Paradise, Nevada, U.S.	
2	Win	2–0	Martin Mnyandu	PTS	4	25 Jun 1994	Convention Centre, Mmabatho, South Africa	
1	Win	1–0	Isaac Skosana	PTS	4	13 Mar 1994	Don Mateman Hall, Eldorado Park, South Africa	

== Boxing Academy ==
The Cassius Baloyi Boxing Academy was launched in January 2010 – a non-profit company dedicated to teaching boxing to underprivileged youths, particularly those living in Alexendra. The academy is affiliated with Sanabo and the local Boxing Committee JABO. Cassius is also training non fighters who enjoy the cardio element and rewards of training like boxers.

== See also ==
- List of world super-featherweight boxing champions

Sporting positions
Minor world boxing titles
Preceded by Frank Toledo	WBU super-bantamweight champion 15 November 1996 – 1997; Vacated	Vacant Title next held by Carlos Navarro
Vacant Title last held by Kevin Kelley	WBU featherweight champion 24 April 1998 – 2002; Vacated	Vacant Title next held by Lehlo Ledwaba
Vacant Title last held by Affif Djelti	IBO super-featherweight champion 17 April 2002 – 29 July 2006	Succeeded by Gairy St. Clair
Vacant Title last held by Gairy St. Clair	IBO super-featherweight champion 3 February 2007 – 2007; Vacated	Vacant Title next held by Billy Dib
Major world boxing titles
Vacant Title last held by Marco Antonio Barrera	IBF super-featherweight champion 31 May 2006 – 29 July 2006	Succeeded by Gairy St. Clair
Preceded by Mzonke Fana	IBF super-featherweight champion 12 April 2008 – 18 April 2009	Succeeded by Malcolm Klassen
