= Joseph Diaz =

American boxer (born 1992)

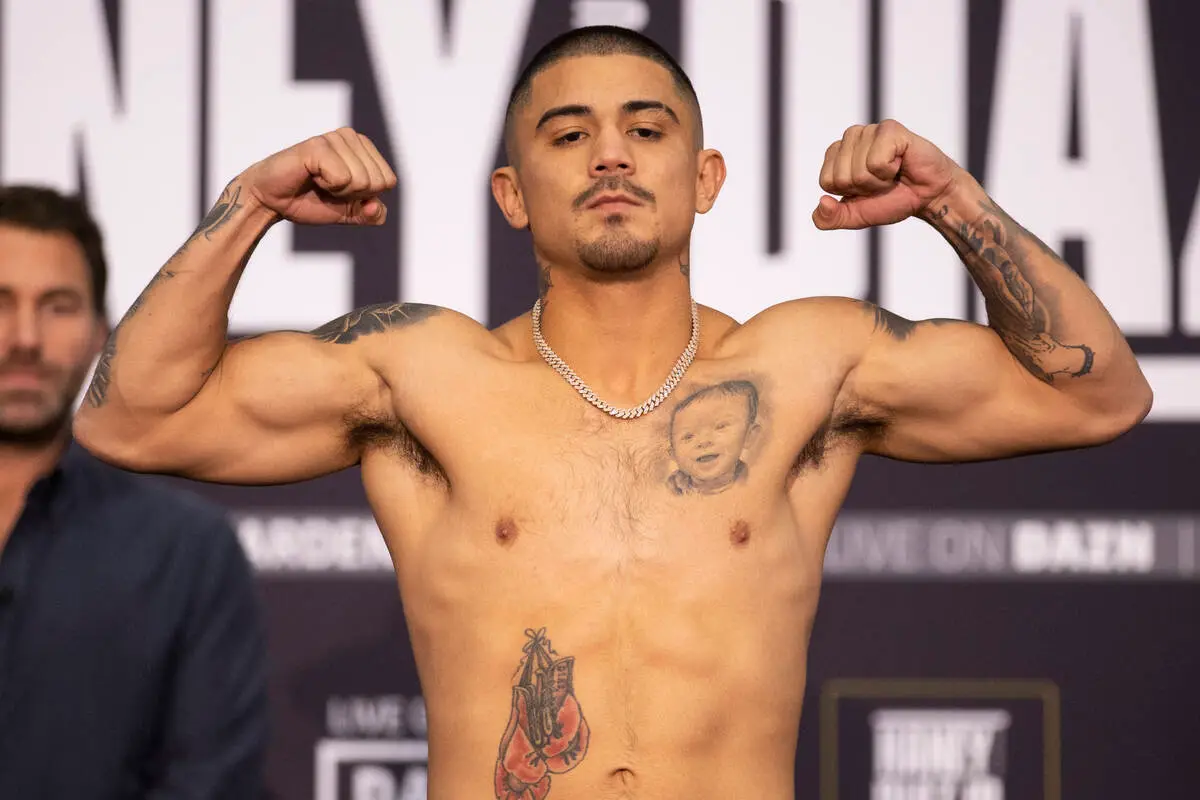

Personal information
- Nickname: JoJo
- Born: Joseph Pedroza Diaz Jr. November 23, 1992 (age 33) South El Monte, California, U.S.
- Height: 5 ft 6 in (168 cm)
- Weight: Featherweight; Super featherweight; Lightweight; Light welterweight

Boxing career
- Reach: 64 in (163 cm)
- Stance: Southpaw

Boxing record
- Total fights: 44
- Wins: 34
- Win by KO: 15
- Losses: 10
- Draws: 1

Joseph "JoJo" Pedroza Diaz Jr. (born November 23, 1992) is a Mexican-American professional boxer who held the International Boxing Federation (IBF) super featherweight title from 2020 to 2021.

== Early life and education ==
Joseph is of Mexican descent. He attended Kranz Intermediate at the age of 12–14. He is left-handed and fights southpaw. As a child he played baseball but took up boxing to learn self-defense. He is coached by his father. He attended South El Monte High School.

== Amateur boxing career ==
Prior to the Olympic Trials, he was the two-time reigning national champion at bantamweight that included a win over Antonio Nieves. Diaz became the first American boxer to qualify for the 2012 Olympics by becoming a quarter-finalist at the 2011 World Championships, where he defeated both 2004 Olympic silver medalist Worapoj Petchkoom of Thailand and former world championship bronze medalist Óscar Valdez of Mexico but lost to Lázaro Álvarez. Díaz was the 2011 U.S. National Champion at featherweight at the U.S. Olympic Training Center in Colorado Springs, Colorado. He fought in the 2010-11 World Series of Boxing

At the 2012 Summer Olympics he beat Pavlo Ishchenko, but ran into Alvarez in his second fight and lost again.

=== World Series of Boxing record ===
1 Win, 1 Loss
| Result | Record | Team | Opponent (Team) | Score | Date | Location | Notes |
| Loss | 1–1 | Los Angeles Matadors | Braulio Ávila (Mexico Guerreros) | 0-3 | 2011-04-13 | (United States) Los Angeles, U.S. | |
| Win | 1–0 | Los Angeles Matadors | (Germany) Ronny Beblik (Memphis Force) | 3-0 | 2011-02-28 | (United States) Memphis, U.S. | |

== Professional boxing career ==
=== Featherweight ===
Diaz made his professional debut in 2012 against Vincent Alfaro, winning by unanimous decision over four rounds and also scored a knockdown in the fourth. On May 9, 2015, Diaz defeated Giovanni Delgado via unanimous decision on the undercard of the Canelo Álvarez vs James Kirkland fight. He stepped up competition against veteran Rene Alvarado in a fight televised on HBO Latino in July 2015 and on December 18, Diaz Jr. defeated Hugo Partida and earned the WBC-NABF featherweight title. He went on to defend the title multiple times, before challenging Gary Russell Jr. for the WBC featherweight title on May 19, 2018, at the MGM National Harbor in Oxon Hill, Maryland. Diaz was unsuccessful, losing a unanimous decision to scores of 117–111, 117–111, 115–113.

=== Super featherweight ===
On January 30, 2020, Diaz defeated IBF super featherweight champion Tevin Farmer by unanimous decision with scores of 115–113, 115–113, and 116–112 to claim his first world title. After the fight, Diaz praised his opponent, saying "Tevin Farmer is a hell of a fighter, guys. I thank him for giving me this opportunity."

Diaz's first defense of his IBF super featherweight title was scheduled for February 13, 2021 against Shavkat Rakhimov. However, he was stripped of the title when he missed weight, weighing 3.6 lbs over the 130 lb limit. As a result, the fight still went ahead, but Diaz was fined $100,000 for missing weight, which represented 20% of his purse. The money was split evenly between Rakhimov and the California State Athletic Commission. They fought to a majority draw, with scores of 115–113 Diaz, 114–114, 114–114.

=== Lightweight ===
==== Diaz vs. Fortuna ====
Following his draw with Shavkat Rakhimov, Diaz moved up to the lightweight division which he promised would be his best weight, where he fought Javier Fortuna for the vacant WBC interim lightweight title on July 9, 2021. Diaz was docked a point in the fourth round for hitting behind the head, but nonetheless emerged as the victor via unanimous decision, with scores of 117–110, 116–111 and 115–112.

==== Diaz vs. Haney ====
On October 8, 2021, it was announced that Diaz would be defending his WBC interim lightweight title against its previous owner, undefeated Ryan García, in Los Angeles on November 27. However, on October 15, Mike Coppinger of ESPN revealed that García had suffered a hand injury and that the fight would be postponed. This led to back and forth on social media between Diaz and Devin Haney, the full WBC lightweight champion, culminating in an official announcement on November 3 that Diaz would now be challenging for Haney's full world title on December 4, instead of defending his interim title against García.

=== Super Lightweight ===
February 15, 2024 in Commerce, California, Diaz was scheduled to face Jesus Antonio Perez Campos at super lightweight. He lost the fight by split decision.

On April 27, 2024 in Fresno, California, Diaz faced Oscar Duarte in a 10-round bout. He lost by knockout in the ninth round, suffering the first stoppage defeat of his professional career.

Diaz sustained a third straight loss when he was defeated via split decision by Abraham Montoya at Osceola Heritage Park, Kissimmee, Florida, on November 9, 2024.

He lost again in his next fight, suffering a unanimous decision defeat to Regis Prograis at Credit Union 1 Arena in Chicago on August 2, 2025.

Diaz fought Alexis Rocha at the Honda Center in Anaheim, California, on March 14, 2026. He lost via unanimous decision.

On June 19, 2026, he faced Ashton Sylve at Thunder Studios in Long Beach, California, losing by unanimous decision.

== Bare knuckle boxing career ==
On 2 July 2026, it was announced that Diaz had signed with BKB. He made his bare knuckle boxing debut at the organisation's BKB 56 event held at The Novo at L.A. Live in Los Angeles on 18 July 2026, knocking out Nate Williams in the first round. On 10 October 2026, Diaz faced Brian Hyslop at BKB 60 at Utilita Arena in Newcastle, England, despite missing the weight limit for the super-lightweight bout by 2.8lbs. He was knocked to the canvas in the first round and, although he got back to his feet and went on to complete the five-round contest, he ultimately lost via split decision.

== Professional boxing record ==
| 45 fights | 34 wins | 10 losses |
|---|---|---|
| By knockout | 15 | 1 |
| By decision | 19 | 9 |
| Draws | 1 | |

| No. | Result | Record | Opponent | Type | Round, time | Date | Location | Notes |
|---|---|---|---|---|---|---|---|---|
| 45 | Loss | 34–10–1 | Ashton Sylve | UD | 10 | Jun 19, 2026 | Thunder Studios, Long Beach, California, U.S. | |
| 44 | Loss | 34–9–1 | Alexis Rocha | UD | 10 | Mar 14, 2026 | Honda Center, Anaheim, California, U.S. | |
| 43 | Loss | 34–8–1 | Regis Prograis | UD | 10 | Aug 2, 2025 | Credit Union 1 Arena, Chicago, Illinois, U.S. | |
| 42 | Win | 34–7–1 | Jorge Luis Valencia Diaz | UD | 8 | Jun 21, 2025 | Tijuana, Baja California, Mexico | |
| 41 | Loss | 33–7–1 | Abraham Montoya | SD | 10 | Nov 9, 2024 | Osceola Heritage Park, Kissimmee, Florida U.S. | |
| 40 | Loss | 33–6–1 | Oscar Duarte | KO | 9 (10), 2:32 | Apr 27, 2024 | Save Mart Arena, Fresno, California, U.S. | |
| 39 | Loss | 33–5–1 | Jesus Antonio Perez Campos | SD | 10 | Feb 15, 2024 | Commerce Casino, Commerce, California, U.S. | |
| 38 | Win | 33–4–1 | Jerry Perez | UD | 10 | Jul 8, 2023 | AT&T Center, San Antonio, Texas, U.S. | |
| 37 | Loss | 32–4–1 | Mercito Gesta | SD | 10 | Mar 18, 2023 | Walter Pyramid, Long Beach, California, U.S. | |
| 36 | Loss | 32–3–1 | William Zepeda | UD | 12 | Oct 29, 2022 | Fantasy Springs Casino, Indio, California, U.S. | |
| 35 | Loss | 32–2–1 | Devin Haney | UD | 12 | Dec 4, 2021 | MGM Grand Garden Arena, Paradise, Nevada, U.S. | For WBC lightweight title |
| 34 | Win | 32–1–1 | Javier Fortuna | UD | 12 | Jul 9, 2021 | Banc of California Stadium, Los Angeles, California, U.S. | Won vacant WBC interim lightweight title |
| 33 | Draw | 31–1–1 | Shavkat Rakhimov | MD | 12 | Feb 13, 2021 | Fantasy Springs Resort Casino, Indio, California, U.S. | |
| 32 | Win | 31–1 | Tevin Farmer | UD | 12 | Jan 30, 2020 | Meridian at Island Gardens, Miami, Florida, U.S. | Won IBF super featherweight title |
| 31 | Win | 30–1 | Jesus Cuadro | MD | 12 | Sep 21, 2019 | Auditorio del Estado, Mexicali, Mexico | |
| 30 | Win | 29–1 | Freddy Fonseca | TKO | 7 (12), 2:07 | May 4, 2019 | T-Mobile Arena, Paradise, Nevada, U.S. | Won vacant WBA Gold super featherweight title |
| 29 | Win | 28–1 | Charles Huerta | UD | 10 | Feb 9, 2019 | Fantasy Springs Resort Casino, Indio, California, U.S. | |
| 28 | Win | 27–1 | Jesús Rojas | UD | 12 | Aug 11, 2018 | The Avalon, Hollywood, California, U.S. | |
| 27 | Loss | 26–1 | Gary Russell Jr. | UD | 12 | May 19, 2018 | MGM National Harbor, Oxon Hill, Maryland, U.S. | For WBC featherweight title |
| 26 | Win | 26–0 | Victor Terrazas | KO | 3 (10), 3:00 | Feb 22, 2018 | Fantasy Springs Resort Casino, Indio, California, U.S. | Retained WBC-NABF, and WBO-NABO featherweight titles |
| 25 | Win | 25–0 | Rafael Rivera | UD | 12 | Sep 16, 2017 | T-Mobile Arena, Paradise, Nevada, U.S. | Retained WBO-NABO featherweight title |
| 24 | Win | 24–0 | Manuel Ávila | UD | 10 | May 6, 2017 | T-Mobile Arena, Paradise, Nevada, U.S. | Retained WBC-NABF featherweight title; Won WBO-NABO featherweight title |
| 23 | Win | 23–0 | Horacio García | UD | 10 | Dec 17, 2016 | The Forum, Inglewood, California, U.S. | Retained WBC-NABF featherweight title |
| 22 | Win | 22–0 | Andrew Cancio | TKO | 9 (10), 2:27 | Sep 17, 2016 | AT&T Stadium, Arlington, Texas, U.S. | Retained WBC-NABF featherweight title |
| 21 | Win | 21–0 | Victor Proa | KO | 2 (10), 1:07 | Jul 30, 2016 | Fantasy Springs Resort Casino, Indio, California, U.S. | Retained WBC-NABF featherweight title |
| 20 | Win | 20–0 | Jayson Vélez | UD | 10 | Apr 23, 2016 | Oracle Arena, Oakland, California, U.S. | Retained WBC-NABF featherweight title |
| 19 | Win | 19–0 | Hugo Partida | TKO | 2 (10), 1:32 | Dec 18, 2015 | Fantasy Springs Resort Casino, Indio, California, U.S. | Won vacant WBC-NABF featherweight title |
| 18 | Win | 18–0 | Ruben Tamayo | UD | 10 | Oct 23, 2015 | Fantasy Springs Resort Casino, Indio, California, U.S. | |
| 17 | Win | 17–0 | Rene Alvarado | UD | 10 | Jul 11, 2015 | Memorial Sports Arena, Los Angeles, California, U.S. | |
| 16 | Win | 16–0 | Giovanni Delgado | UD | 10 | May 9, 2015 | Minute Maid Park, Houston, Texas, U.S. | |
| 15 | Win | 15–0 | Juan Luis Hernandez | TKO | 3 (10), 3:00 | Mar 6, 2015 | Belasco Theater, Los Angeles, California, U.S. | |
| 14 | Win | 14–0 | Jose Angel Beranza | UD | 10 | Dec 8, 2014 | Cowboys Dance Hall, San Antonio, Texas, U.S. | |
| 13 | Win | 13–0 | Roberto Castaneda | RTD | 4 (10), 3:00 | Nov 13, 2014 | Fantasy Springs Resort Casino, Indio, California, U.S. | |
| 12 | Win | 12–0 | Raul Hidalgo | TKO | 7 (10), 2:13 | Sep 29, 2014 | State Farm Arena, Hidalgo, Texas, U.S. | |
| 11 | Win | 11–0 | Ramiro Robles | UD | 10 | Jul 9, 2014 | Hard Rock Hotel & Casino, Paradise, Nevada, U.S. | |
| 10 | Win | 10–0 | Luis Maldonado | UD | 6 | Apr 26, 2014 | StubHub Center, Carson, California, U.S. | |
| 9 | Win | 9–0 | Joivany Fuentes | TKO | 5 (8), 2:59 | Mar 8, 2014 | MGM Grand Garden Arena, Paradise, Nevada, U.S. | |
| 8 | Win | 8–0 | Carlos Rodriguez | TKO | 7 (8), 1:13 | Dec 13, 2013 | Fantasy Springs Resort Casino, Indio, California, U.S | |
| 7 | Win | 7–0 | Noel Mendoza | KO | 3 (6), 1:54 | Aug 24, 2013 | StubHub Center, Carson, California, U.S. | |
| 6 | Win | 6–0 | Luis Cosme | KO | 1 (6), 2:09 | Jul 20, 2013 | Fantasy Springs Resort Casino, Indio, California, U.S. | |
| 5 | Win | 5–0 | Rigoberto Casillas | RTD | 3 (6), 3:00 | Jun 8, 2013 | Home Depot Center, Carson, California, U.S. | |
| 4 | Win | 4–0 | Eric Gotay | TKO | 3 (6), 2:13 | May 3, 2013 | Cosmopolitan of Las Vegas, Paradise, Nevada, U.S. | |
| 3 | Win | 3–0 | Alberto Cupido | UD | 6 | Mar 16, 2013 | Grand Oasis, Cancún, Mexico | |
| 2 | Win | 2–0 | Jose Ruiz | TKO | 2 (4), 2:03 | Feb 2, 2013 | Cosmopolitan of Las Vegas, Paradise, Nevada, U.S. | |
| 1 | Win | 1–0 | Vicente Afaro Martinez | UD | 4 | Dec 15, 2012 | Memorial Sports Arena, Los Angeles, California, U.S. | |

== Bare knuckle boxing record ==
Professional record breakdown
| 2 matches | 1 win | 1 loss |
| By knockout | 1 | 0 |
| By decision | 0 | 1 |

| Res. | Record | Opponent | Method | Event | Date | Round | Time | Location | Notes |
|---|---|---|---|---|---|---|---|---|---|
| Loss | 1–1 | Brian Hyslop | Decision (split) | BKB 60 | Oct 10, 2026 | 5 | 3:00 | Utilita Arena, Newcastle, England | |
| Win | 1–0 | Nate Williams | KO (punch) | BKB 56 | July 18, 2026 | 1 | 1:43 | The Novo at L.A. Live, Los Angeles, California, United States | |

== See also ==
- List of world super-featherweight boxing champions
- List of Mexican boxing world champions

Sporting positions
Regional boxing titles
| Vacant Title last held by Marvin Sonsona | WBC-NABF featherweight champion December 18, 2015 – April 2018 | Vacant Title next held by Manny Robles III |
| Vacant Title last held by Miguel Marriaga | WBO-NABO featherweight champion May 6, 2017 – April 2018 | Vacant Title next held by Joet Gonzalez |
Minor world boxing titles
| Inaugural champion | WBA Gold super featherweight champion May 4 – December 2019 | Vacant Title next held by Mark Urbanov |
Major world boxing titles
| Preceded by Tevin Farmer | IBF super featherweight champion January 30, 2020 – February 12, 2021; Stripped | Vacant Title next held by Kenichi Ogawa |
| Vacant Title last held by Ryan García | WBC lightweight interim champion July 9 – December 4, 2021; Lost bid for full title | Vacant Title next held by O'Shaquie Foster |
