= Roberto David Arrieta =

Argentine boxer

Personal information
- Nickname: Yarará
- Nationality: (Argentina) Argentine
- Born: Roberto David Arrieta; December 20, 1975 (age 50) Victorica, La Pampa, Argentina
- Height: 5 ft 9 in (1.75 m)
- Weight: Welterweight; Light Welterweight; Lightweight; Super Featherweight

Boxing career
- Reach: 71 in (182 cm)
- Stance: Orthodox

Boxing record
- Total fights: 61
- Wins: 40
- Win by KO: 20
- Losses: 17
- Draws: 4
- No contests: 0

Roberto David Arrieta (born September 4, 1972) is an Argentine professional boxer in the Welterweight division and is the former WBC Mundo Hispano Super Featherweight Champion.

== Pro career ==
In August 2008, Arrieta upset the undefeated Victor Cardozo Coronel to win the WBC Mundo Hispano Super Featherweight Championship.

=== Ortiz vs. Arrieta ===
On September 13, 2008 Arrieta was knocked out by future world champion and actor Victor Ortíz at the MGM Grand in Las Vegas, Nevada.

== Professional boxing record ==
40 Wins (20 knockouts), 17 Losses, 4 Draws
Res.	Record	Opponent	Type	Rd., Time	Date	Location	Notes
Win	40-17-4	(Argentina) Sergio Javier Escobar	UD	6 (6)	2012-06-15	Club Ferro Carril Oeste, General Pico, La Pampa, Argentina	
Win	39-17-4	(Argentina) Ricardo Fabricio Chamorro	UD	8 (8)	2011-05-13	Realico, La Pampa, Argentina	
Win	38-17-4	(Argentina) Nestor Fabian Lagos	KO	4 (8)	2011-04-30	Realico, La Pampa, Argentina	
Win	37-17-4	(Paraguay) Victor Cardozo Coronel	TKO	9 (12)	2010-12-03	Club General Belgrano, Santa Rosa, La Pampa, Argentina	
Loss	36-17-4	(Argentina) Alberto Leopoldo Santillan	UD	10 (10)	2010-10-08	Club Belgrano, San Nicolas, Buenos Aires, Argentina	
Win	36-16-4	(Argentina) Norberto Adrian Acosta	KO	2 (8)	2010-08-06	Club Fortín Roca, Santa Rosa, La Pampa, Argentina	
Loss	35-16-4	(United States) Robert Guerrero	TKO	8 (10)	2010-04-30	(United States) Tropicana Hotel & Casino, Las Vegas, Nevada, USA	
Win	35-15-4	(Argentina) Mario Alberto Quintuman	KO	4 (8)	2010-04-03	Los Ranqueles de Cayupan, Catrilo, La Pampa, Argentina	
Loss	34-15-4	(South Africa) Cassius Baloyi	UD	12 (12)	2009-10-30	Wembley Indoor Arena, Johannesburg, Gauteng, South Africa	
Win	34-14-4	(Argentina) Marcos Valdez	KO	2 (8)	2009-06-05	Club Ferro Carril Oeste, General Pico, La Pampa, Argentina	
Win	33-14-4	(Argentina) Matias Daniel Ferreyra	TKO	12 (12)	2009-04-18	Club Sarmiento, Pigue, Buenos Aires, Argentina	
Win	32-14-4	(Chile) Cristian Palma	DQ	8 (10)	2008-12-07	Club Cochicó, Victorica, La Pampa, Argentina	Retain WBC Mundo Hispano super featherweight title
Win	31-14-4	(Argentina) Alejandro Lima	TKO	6 (10)	2008-11-08	Tres Lomas, La Pampa, Argentina	
Loss	30-14-4	(United States) Victor Ortiz	TKO	5 (12)	2008-09-13	(United States) MGM Grand, Las Vegas, Nevada, USA	For vacant WBO NABO light welterweight title
Win	30-13-4	(Paraguay) Victor Cardozo Coronel	RTD	6 (12)	2008-08-29	Club Deportivo Argentino, 30 de Agosto, Buenos Aires, Argentina	Won vacant WBC Mundo Hispano super featherweight title
Win	29-13-4	(Argentina) Luis Ariel Rojas	KO	3 (10)	2008-08-08	Club Manuel J. Campos, General Acha, La Pampa, Argentina	
Win	28-13-4	(Argentina) Diego Humberto Mora	KO	3 (12)	2008-07-05	Club Cochicó, Victorica, La Pampa, Argentina	
Loss	27-13-4	(United States) Vicente Escobedo	UD	10 (10)	2008-05-02	(United States) Home Depot Center, Carson, California, USA	
Win	27-12-4	(Chile) Carlos Narvaez	KO	2 (10)	2007-11-09	Victorica, La Pampa, Argentina	
Win	26-12-4	(Chile) Hardy Paredes	KO	8 (10)	2007-09-01	Bernasconi, La Pampa, Argentina	
Win	25-12-4	(Argentina) Miguel Dario Lombardo	KO	10 (12)	2007-06-29	Gimnasio Bautista Matos, Costa Brava, La Pampa, Argentina	
Win	24-12-4	(Argentina) Sergio Daniel Ledesma	KO	2 (10)	2007-05-19	Club Deportivo Argentino, 30 de Agosto, Buenos Aires, Argentina	
Win	23-12-4	(Argentina) Matias Daniel Ferreyra	UD	12 (12)	2007-04-13	Club Atletico Costa Brava, General Pico, La Pampa, Argentina	
Loss	22-12-4	(South Africa) Mzonke Fana	UD	12 (12)	2006-12-08	Nasrec Indoor Arena, Johannesburg, Gauteng, South Africa	
Win	22-11-4	(Argentina) Javier Osvaldo Alvarez	UD	12 (12)	2006-07-29	Club General Belgrano, Santa Rosa, La Pampa, Argentina	Retain South American super featherweight title
Win	21-11-4	(Argentina) Ricardo Ariel Elias	KO	3 (12)	2006-04-29	Club Estudiantes, Santa Rosa, La Pampa, Argentina	Won vacant South American super featherweight title
Loss	20-11-4	(Argentina) Cesar Cuenca	TD	8 (10)	2006-03-11	Ce.De.M. N° 2, Caseros, Buenos Aires, Argentina	
Win	20-10-4	(Argentina) Justo Evangelista Martinez	TD	7 (10)	2006-02-09	Bolívar, Buenos Aires, Argentina	
Win	19-10-4	(Argentina) Julio Gonzalez	UD	10 (10)	2005-10-08	Club Juventud Unida, Quehue, La Pampa, Argentina	
Win	18-10-4	(Argentina) Julio Gonzalez	UD	6 (6)	2005-09-02	Club Sportivo Pampero, Ataliva Roca, La Pampa, Argentina	
Loss	17-10-4	(Argentina) Aldo Nazareno Rios	UD	12 (12)	2005-08-06	Estadio Ruca Che, Neuquen, Neuquen, Argentina	
Loss	17-9-4	(Argentina) Julio Pablo Chacon	KO	2 (10)	2005-04-09	Estadio Pascual Perez, Mendoza, Mendoza, Argentina	
Win	17-8-4	(Argentina) Sergio Javier Benitez	UD	10 (10)	2005-02-12	General Acha, La Pampa, Argentina	
Loss	16-8-4	(Argentina) Diego Martin Alzugaray	UD	12 (12)	2004-11-05	Sociedad Española, San Luis, San Luis, Argentina	
Loss	16-7-4	(Argentina) Aldo Nazareno Rios	UD	12 (12)	2004-07-17	Club Ciclista Juninense, Junín, Buenos Aires, Argentina	
Win	16-6-4	(Argentina) Javier Osvaldo Alvarez	UD	12 (12)	2004-02-21	Club Atletico Newell's Old Boys, Rosario, Santa Fe, Argentina	
Loss	15-6-4	(Argentina) Carlos Rios	TD	9 (10)	2003-10-17	Santa Rosa, La Pampa, Argentina	
