= Joe Noynay =

Filipino boxer

Personal information
- Nickname: Jaw Breaker
- Nationality: Filipino
- Born: Joe Marie Tangaro Noynay; 4 September 1996 (age 30) Bogo, Cebu, U.S.
- Height: 5 ft 8 in (173 cm)
- Weight: Super bantamweight Super featherweight Welterweight

Boxing career
- Stance: Southpaw

Boxing record
- Total fights: 30
- Wins: 23
- Win by KO: 11
- Losses: 5
- Draws: 2

Joe Marie Tangaro Noynay (born 4 September 1996) is a Filipino professional boxer, who held the WBO Asia Pacific super featherweight title between 2019 and 2022.

== Professional boxing career ==
=== Early career ===
Noynay made his professional debut against Jestoni Autida on 7 September 2013. He won the fight by unanimous decision. Noynay amassed a 10–0 record during the next two years, with 3 stoppage victories, before challenging for his fist professional title. Noynay was booked to fight Alie Laurel for the vacant WBC International title on 18 February 2016. The fight ended in a split decision draw, after the twelve rounds were contested. Three months later, on 4 May 2016, Noynay faced Richard Pumicpic for the same vacant title. Pumicpic won the fight by an eight-round technical decision.

=== Regional super featherweight champion ===
==== WBO Asia Pacific Youth champion ====
Noynay challenged the unbeaten WBO Asia Pacific Youth super featherweight champion Jinxiang Pan on 16 December 2017. The vacant WBC-ABC Silver super featherweight title was on the line as well. A technical decision was given at the end of the eight round, as Noynay was unable to continue competing due to a cut above his right eyebrow, which was opened by an accidental clash of heads in the sixth round. Two of the judges scored the fight 76–74 for Noynay, while the third judge scored it 78–72 in his favor.

Noynay made his first WBO Asia Pacific title defense against Hector Garcia Montes in the main event of a 7 April 2018 card, which took place at the Bogo City Sports & Cultural Complex in Bogo. He won the fight by majority decision, with scores of 95–95, 96–94 and 96–94. Noynay made his second WBO Asia Pacific title defense against Qixiu Zhang on 20 September 2018, at the SM Mall of Asia in Metro Manila. He won the fight by an eight-round technical knockout. Zhang was knocked down twice in the eight round, with his corner opting to throw in the towel after the second knocdown.

==== WBO Asia Pacific champion ====
Three months later, on 9 December 2018, Noynay was booked to face the journeyman Junny Salogaol in a tune-up fight. He won the fight by unanimous decision, with all three judges scoring the fight 80–72 in his favor. After successfully winning his stay-busy fight, Noynay was scheduled to face Kosuke Saka for the vacant WBO Asia Pacific super featherweight title on 20 April 2019, in the main even of "Fighting Beat Boxing". He won the fight by a second-round technical knockout. Noynay first dropped Saka with a left straight at the end of the first round, and knocked him down twice more in the second round before the midway point of the round, which prompted Saka's corner to throw in the towel.

Noynay made his first WBO Asia Pacific title defense against the 2012 Olympics bronze medalist and Japanese super featherweight champion Satoshi Shimizu on July 12, 2019, on the Rob Brant vs Ryota Murata II undercard, at the Osaka Prefectural Gymnasium in Osaka, Japan. Despite coming into the fight as an underdog, Noynay won the fight by a sixth-round technical knockout. He knocked down Shimizu early in the first round, before finally finishing him with a flurry of punches in the sixth round.

Noynay made his second WBO Asia Pacific title defense against the one-time IBF super featherweight title challenger Kenichi Ogawa on 7 December 2019. The fight was ruled as split draw by technical decision, with scores of 49–46, 47-48 and 48-48. The pair both suffered cuts above the left eye after an accidental head clash in the first round, with Noynay's cut worsening as the bout went on, which finally left him unable to compete at the end of the fifth round.

Noynay made his third WBO regional title defense against the undefeated Liam Wilson on 7 July 2021, on the undercard of the Tim Tszyu and Steve Spark super welterweight bout. The card was broadcast by ESPN+ and Kayo Sports. He won the fight by a fifth-round technical knockout. Noynay knocked Wilson down once in the first round, twice in the fourth round, and once in the fifth round. The referee finally waved the fight off after the fourth knockdown.

Noynay is scheduled to make his fourth WBO Asia Pacific title defense against Liam Wilson. The bout is an immediate rematch of their 7 July 2021 meeting, which Noynay won by a fifth-round stoppage. The event was later postponed for 3 March, due to the floods in Brisbane. Noynay failed to make championship weight, as he came in almost 4 kg over the limit. Noynay lost the fight by a second-round knockout.

== Professional boxing record ==
| 30 fights | 23 wins | 5 losses |
|---|---|---|
| By knockout | 11 | 3 |
| By decision | 12 | 2 |
| Draws | 2 | |

| No. | Result | Record | Opponent | Type | Round, time | Date | Location | Notes |
|---|---|---|---|---|---|---|---|---|
| 30 | Loss | 23–5–2 | Daniyar Yeleussinov | RTD | 5 (10), 3:00 | 28 Sep 2024 | Almaty Arena, Almaty, Kazakhstan | |
| 29 | Loss | 23–4–2 | Jin Sasaki | TKO | 5 (12), 0:43 | 16 May 2024 | Korakuen Hall, Tokyo, Japan | For WBO Asia Pacific and vacant OPBF welterweight title |
| 28 | Win | 23–3–2 | Ramadhan Weriuw | TKO | 1 (10), 2:03 | 9 Dec 2023 | The Flash Grand Ballroom of the Elorde Sports Complex, Parañaque City, Philippines | |
| 27 | Win | 22–3–2 | Argie Toquero | TKO | 1 (12) 1:17 | 7 Oct 2023 | The Flash Grand Ballroom of the Elorde Sports Complex, Parañaque City, Philippines | Retained PGAB Welterweight title |
| 26 | Win | 21–3–2 | Larry Siwu | TKO | 4 (12), 2:43 | 17 Jun 2023 | The Flash Grand Ballroom of the Elorde Sports Complex, Parañaque City, Philippines | Won vacant IBF Pan Pacific welterweight title |
| 25 | Win | 20–3–2 | Adam Diu Abdulhamid | UD | 12 | 10 Dec 2022 | Mandaluyong City College, Mandaluyong City, Philippines | Won PGAB Welterweight title |
| 24 | Loss | 19–3–2 | Liam Wilson | KO | 2 (10), 2:42 | 3 Mar 2022 | Brisbane Convention & Exhibition Centre, Brisbane, Australia | Lost WBO Asia Pacific super featherweight title |
| 23 | Win | 19–2–2 | Liam Wilson | TKO | 5 (10), 2:40 | 7 Jul 2021 | Newcastle Entertainment Centre, Newcastle, Australia | Retained WBO Asia Pacific super featherweight title |
| 22 | Draw | 18–2–2 | Kenichi Ogawa | TD | 5 (12), 2:07 | 7 Dec 2019 | Korakuen Hall, Tokyo, Japan | Retained WBO Asia Pacific super featherweight title |
| 21 | Win | 18–2–1 | Satoshi Shimizu | TKO | 6 (12), 2:18 | 12 Jul 2019 | Korakuen Hall, Tokyo, Japan | Retained WBO Asia Pacific super featherweight title |
| 20 | Win | 17–2–1 | Kosuke Saka | TKO | 2 (12), 1:15 | 20 Apr 2019 | Edion Arena Osaka, Osaka Japan | Won vacant WBO Asia Pacific super featherweight title |
| 19 | Win | 16–2–1 | Junny Salogaol | UD | 8 | 9 Dec 2018 | The Flash Grand Ballroom of the Elorde Sports Complex, Parañaque City, Philippines | |
| 18 | Win | 15–2–1 | Qixiu Zhang | TKO | 8 (10), 1:56 | 20 Sep 2018 | SM Mall of Asia Music Hall, Pasay City, Philippines | Retained WBO Asia Pacific Youth super featherweight title |
| 17 | Win | 14–2–1 | Hector Garcia Montes | MD | 10 | 7 Apr 2018 | Bogo City Sports & Cultural Complex, Bogo City, Philippines | Retained WBO Asia Pacific Youth super featherweight title |
| 16 | Win | 13–2–1 | Jinxiang Pan | TD | 8 (10) | 16 Dec 2017 | Zhongshan Sports Arena, Zhongshan, China | Won WBO Asia Pacific Youth super featherweight title Won vacant WBC-ABC Silver super featherweight title |
| 15 | Loss | 12–2–1 | Reiya Abe | UD | 8 | 28 Feb 2017 | Korakuen Hall, Tokyo, Japan | |
| 14 | Win | 12–1–1 | Danilo Pena | UD | 6 | 15 Dec 2016 | SM Mall of Asia Music Hall, Pasay City, Philippines | |
| 13 | Win | 11–1–1 | Danilo Gabisay | KO | 1 (8), 1:37 | 1 Oct 2016 | The Flash Grand Ballroom of the Elorde Sports Complex, Parañaque City, Philippines | Won vacant WBC-ABC Silver super featherweight title |
| 12 | Loss | 10–1–1 | Richard Pumicpic | TD | 8 (12) | 4 May 2016 | SM Mall of Asia Music Hall, Pasay City, Philippines | For vacant WBC International super bantamweight title |
| 11 | Draw | 10–0–1 | Alie Laurel | SD | 12 | 18 Feb 2016 | SM Mall of Asia Music Hall, Pasay City, Philippines | For vacant WBC International super bantamweight title |
| 10 | Win | 10–0 | Marvin Abila | TKO | 2 (12) | 24 Oct 2015 | The Flash Grand Ballroom of the Elorde Sports Complex, Parañaque City, Philippines | |
| 9 | Win | 9–0 | Edison Berwela | UD | 12 | 5 Jun 2015 | SM Mall of Asia Music Hall, Pasay City, Philippines | |
| 8 | Win | 8–0 | Jovill Marayan | TKO | 3 (8), 2:11 | 25 Mar 2015 | Manila Hotel, Manila, Philippines | |
| 7 | Win | 7–0 | Pablito Canada | UD | 8 | 29 Nov 2014 | The Flash Grand Ballroom of the Elorde Sports Complex, Parañaque City, Philippines | |
| 6 | Win | 6–0 | Junjie Lauza | KO | 1 (8), 1:04 | 27 Sep 2014 | SM Mall of Asia Music Hall, Pasay City, Philippines | |
| 5 | Win | 5–0 | Mark Postrano | UD | 6 | 26 Jul 2014 | The Flash Grand Ballroom of the Elorde Sports Complex, Parañaque City, Philippines | |
| 4 | Win | 4–0 | Joel Lagusan | UD | 6 | 14 May 2014 | Hyatt Hotel, Manila, Philippines | |
| 3 | Win | 3–0 | Vicencio Rubas | UD | 4 | 15 Mar 2014 | Barangay San Dionisio Covered Court, Parañaque City, Philippines | |
| 2 | Win | 2–0 | Germaine Dela Rosa | SD | 4 | 27 Oct 2013 | The Flash Grand Ballroom of the Elorde Sports Complex, Parañaque City, Philippines | |
| 1 | Win | 1–0 | Jestoni Autida | UD | 4 | 7 Sep 2013 | The Flash Grand Ballroom of the Elorde Sports Complex, Parañaque City, Philippines | |
