= Malcolm Klassen =

South African boxer

Personal information
- Nickname: Stone
- Born: Malcolm Elton Klassen; 3 December 1981 (age 44) Toekomsrus, Gauteng, South Africa
- Height: 5 ft 4 1/2 in (164 cm)
- Weight: Featherweight; Super featherweight; Lightweight

Boxing career
- Stance: Orthodox

Boxing record
- Total fights: 45
- Wins: 34
- Win by KO: 18
- Losses: 9
- Draws: 2

Malcolm Klassen (born in Hammanskraal, Gauteng, South Africa) is a South African professional boxer. He held the IBF super featherweight title twice from 2006 until 2007, as well as in 2009.

== Professional career ==
Klassen turned professional in 1999 & compiled a record of 18–3–2 before beating Gairy St. Clair to win the IBF super featherweight championship. He would lose the title in his first defense to fellow countryman Mzonke Fana in 2007. He would regain the title two years later against another South African boxer Cassius Baloyi, before once again losing the title in his first defense to American challenger Robert Guerrero.

== Professional boxing record ==
45 fights	34 wins	9 losses
By knockout	18	2
By decision	16	7
Draws	2	

No.	Result	Record	Opponent	Type	Round, time	Date	Location	Notes
45	Loss	34–9–2	Azinga Fuzile	TKO	4 (12)	2018-10-21	Orient Theatre, East London, South Africa	For IBF African super-featherweight title
44	Win	34–8–2	Yohani Banda	TKO	2 (10)	2018-07-28	Civic Centre, Rustenburg, South Africa	
43	Loss	33–8–2	Shavkat Rakhimov	TKO	8 (12)	2018-02-10	DIVS, Yekaterinburg, Russia	For IBO super-featherweight title
42	Loss	33–7–2	Mikhail Alexeev	UD	10 (10)	2017-09-09	Traktor Ice Arena, Chelyabinsk, Russia	
41	Win	33–6–2	Jack Asis	UD	12 (12)	2016-08-05	Emerald Resort & Casino, Vanderbijlpark, South Africa	Won IBO super-featherweight title
40	Win	32–6–2	Leonilo Miranda	TKO	1 (12)	2016-04-29	Ngoako Ramatlhodi Sports Complex, Seshego, South Africa	
39	Win	31–6–2	Reynaldo Cajina	PTS	6 (6)	2015-09-12	Evoque Nightclub, Preston, England, U.K.	
38	Win	30–6–2	Xolani Mcotheli	KO	10 (12)	2015-04-24	Orient Theatre, East London, South Africa	
37	Win	29–6–2	Paulus Moses	UD	12 (12)	2015-03-20	Ramatex Factory, Windhoek, Namibia	Won vacant WBO International lightweight title
36	Win	28–6–2	Justin Savi	TKO	4 (10)	2014-09-29	Emperors Palace, Kempton Park, South Africa	
35	Loss	27–6–2	Will Tomlinson	UD	12 (12)	2013-05-16	The Melbourne Pavilion, Ascot Vale, Australia	For IBO super-featherweight title
34	Win	27–5–2	Bongani Mahlangu	UD	8 (8)	2012-12-03	Emperors Palace, Kempton Park, South Africa	
33	Win	26–5–2	Cassius Baloyi	UD	8 (8)	2012-10-14	Nasrec Indoor Arena, Johannesburg, South Africa	
32	Win	25–5–2	Daniel Lomeli	UD	12 (12)	2011-11-19	Montecasino, Fourways, South Africa	Won vacant WBF super-featherweight title
31	Loss	24–5–2	Robert Guerrero	UD	12 (12)	2009-08-22	Toyota Center, Houston, Texas, U.S.	Lost IBF super-featherweight title
30	Win	24–4–2	Cassius Baloyi	TKO	7 (12)	2009-04-18	North-West University Sports Complex, Mafikeng, South Africa	Won IBF super-featherweight title
29	Win	23–4–2	Manuel Medina	TKO	2 (12)	2008-08-29	Carousel Casino, Hammanskraal, South Africa	
28	Win	22–4–2	Joel De la Cruz	KO	7 (10)	2008-04-12	North-West University Sports Complex, Mafikeng, South Africa	
27	Win	21–4–2	Pablo Ernesto Oliveto	TKO	5 (10)	2007-11-30	Carousel Casino, Hammanskraal, South Africa	
26	Win	20–4–2	Edward Mpofu	TKO	5 (8)	2007-07-05	Emperors Palace, Kempton Park, South Africa	
25	Loss	19–4–2	Mzonke Fana	SD	12 (12)	2007-04-20	Oliver Thambo Hall, Khayelitsha, South Africa	Lost IBF super-featherweight title
24	Win	19–3–2	Gairy St. Clair	SD	12 (12)	2006-11-04	Emperors Palace, Kempton Park, South Africa	Won IBF super-featherweight title
23	Win	18–3–2	Manelisi Mbilase	RTD	4 (12)	2006-07-29	Emperors Palace, Kempton Park, South Africa	Retained South African featherweight title
22	Win	17–3–2	Willie Mabasa	UD	12 (12)	2006-05-25	Carnival City, Brakpan, South Africa	Retained South African featherweight title
21	Win	16–3–2	Lindile Tyhali	TKO	3 (12)	2006-02-25	Carnival City, Brakpan, South Africa	Retained South African featherweight title
20	Win	15–3–2	Edward Mpofu	SD	12 (12)	2005-08-31	Carnival City, Brakpan, South Africa	Won vacant South African featherweight title
19	Win	14–3–2	Mico Makhwelo	TKO	4 (6)	2004-10-29	Graceland Hotel Casino, Secunda, South Africa	
18	Draw	13–3–2	Jeffrey Mathebula	PTS	6 (6)	2004-09-28	Carousel Casino, Hammanskraal, South Africa	
17	Win	13–3–1	Oupa Lubisi	PTS	6 (6)	2004-03-12	Carousel Casino, Hammanskraal, South Africa	
16	Win	12–3–1	Mzwakhe Magazi	TKO	1 (6)	2003-08-29	Cedar Park, Woodmead, South Africa	
15	Win	11–3–1	Jasper Seroka	PTS	6 (6)	2003-06-25	Park Station Concourse, Johannesburg, South Africa	
14	Win	10–3–1	William Mpongo	KO	4 (6)	2003-02-07	Emerald Resort & Casino, Vanderbijlpark, South Africa	
13	Win	9–3–1	Lee Holmes	TKO	4 (6)	2002-10-15	York Hall, London, England, U.K.	
12	Win	8–3–1	Shadrack Montsho	TKO	4 (6)	2002-06-29	Dobsonville Shopping Centre, Soweto, South Africa	
11	Loss	7–3–1	Harry Ramogoadi	PTS	6 (6)	2001-11-02	Town Hall, Benoni, South Africa	
10	Win	7–2–1	William Mpongo	MD	6 (6)	2001-05-27	Boulder Shopping Centre, Midrand, South Africa	
9	Win	6–2–1	Elton Taaibos	TKO	8 (8)	2001-03-25	Sam Hlalele Hall, Thembisa, South Africa	
8	Win	5–2–1	Springkaan Khongoane	PTS	6 (6)	2000-12-03	Maraisburg Town Hall, Johannesburg, South Africa	
7	Win	4–2–1	Peter Skosana	UD	8 (8)	2000-07-29	Maraisburg Town Hall, Johannesburg, South Africa	
6	Loss	3–2–1	Takalani Ndlovu	PTS	6 (6)	2000-04-26	Carousel Casino, Hammanskraal, South Africa	
5	Loss	3–1–1	Colin Mutsila	PTS	6 (6)	2000-02-29	Carousel Casino, Hammanskraal, South Africa	
4	Draw	3–0–1	Joshua Khoase	PTS	4 (4)	1999-11-23	Carousel Casino, Hammanskraal, South Africa	
3	Win	3–0	Tshumbedzo Tshishonge	TKO	3 (4)	1999-09-03	Lynnville Community Hall, Witbank, South Africa	
2	Win	2–0	Hoosan Mohammed	PTS	4 (4)	1999-07-18	Morula Sun Casino, Mabopane, South Africa	
1	Win	1–0	Stevens Moeketsane	PTS	4 (4)	1999-05-22	Lynnville Community Hall, Witbank, South Africa	

== See also ==
- List of world super-featherweight boxing champions

Sporting positions
Regional boxing titles
Vacant Title last held by Takalani Ndlovu	South African featherweight champion 31 August 2005 – 4 November 2006; Won world title	Vacant Title next held by Ludumo Galada
Vacant Title last held by Paulus Moses	WBO International lightweight champion 20 March 2015 – 2005; Vacated	Vacant Title next held by Diego Magdaleno
Minor world boxing titles
Vacant Title last held by Carl Greaves	WBF super-featherweight champion 19 November 2011 – 2012; Vacated	Vacant Title next held by Jesus Cruz Bibiano
Preceded by Jack Asis	IBO super-featherweight champion 5 August 2016 – 2017; Vacated	Vacant Title next held by Shavkat Rakhimov
Major world boxing titles
Preceded by Gairy St. Clair	IBF super-featherweight champion 4 November 2006 – 20 April 2007	Succeeded by Mzonke Fana
Preceded by Cassius Baloyi	IBF super-featherweight champion 18 April 2009 – 22 August 2009	Succeeded by Robert Guerrero
