= Mzonke Fana =

South African boxer

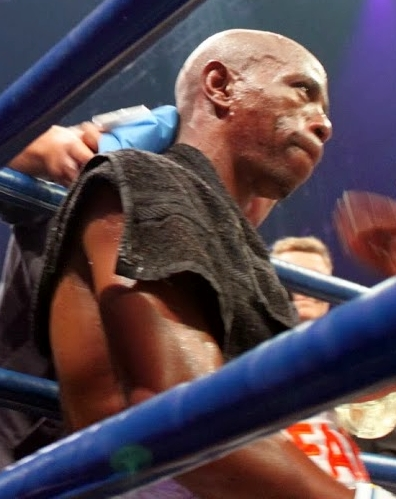
- Fana in Espoo (December 2013)

Personal information
- Nickname: The Rose of Khayelitsha
- Born: 29 October 1973 (age 52) Qumbu, Eastern Cape, South Africa
- Height: 5 ft 7 in (170 cm)
- Weight: Super featherweight; Lightweight

Boxing career
- Reach: 70 in (178 cm)
- Stance: Orthodox

Boxing record
- Total fights: 51
- Wins: 38
- Win by KO: 16
- Losses: 13

Mzonke Fana (born 29 October 1973) is a professional boxer. He held the IBF super featherweight title twice between 2007 and 2010, and challenged twice for other world titles.

== Professional career ==
=== Super featherweight ===
Known as "The Rose of Khayelitsha", he was a virtual unknown in the boxing world until he challenged and defeated Malcolm Klassen for the IBF Super featherweight title in 2007. Prior to that victory, he was knocked out on 9 April 2005 by future Hall of Famer Marco Antonio Barrera in the second round for the WBC Super featherweight title in his first world title challenge.

=== Lightweight ===
On 7 December 2013, he fought upcoming fighter Edis Tatli for the WBA Inter-Continental Lightweight Title at the Barona Areena in Espoo, Finland, but lost via unanimous decision. He fought Terry Flanagan for the WBO Lightweight Title and lost via unanimous decision.

== Professional boxing record ==
51 fights	38 wins	13 losses
By knockout	16	2
By decision	22	11

No.	Result	Record	Opponent	Type	Round, time	Date	Location	Notes
51	Loss	38–13	Thompson Mokwana	UD	12 (12)	2017-06-16	Turffontein Racecourse, Johannesburg, South Africa	Lost South African lightweight title
50	Loss	38–12	Howik Bebraham	UD	8 (8)	2017-03-04	ASV Halle, Dachau, Germany	
49	Loss	38–11	Emmanuel Tagoe	UD	12 (12)	2016-12-02	Bukom Boxing Arena, Accra, Ghana	For vacant IBO lightweight title
48	Loss	38–10	Terry Flanagan	UD	12 (12)	2016-07-16	Ice Arena Wales, Cardiff, Wales	For WBO lightweight title
47	Win	38–9	Vusumzi Bokolo	TKO	7 (12)	2016-03-11	Orient Theatre, East London, South Africa	Retained South African lightweight title
46	Win	37–9	Xolani Mcotheli	RTD	8 (12)	2015-12-18	Orient Theatre, East London, South Africa	
45	Loss	36–9	Hedi Slimani	UD	12 (12)	2015-11-11	Zwevezele, Belgium	For vacant ABU lightweight title
44	Win	36–8	Sipho Taliwe	PTS	12 (12)	2015-10-16	Orient Theatre, East London, South Africa	Won vacant South African lightweight title
43	Win	35–8	Said Zungu	UD	10 (10)	2015-08-28	Graceland Hotel Casino, Secunda, South Africa	Won vacant WBF International lightweight title
42	Loss	34–8	Xolisani Ndongeni	MD	12 (12)	2015-06-06	Emperors Palace, Kempton Park, South Africa	
41	Win	34–7	Koos Sibiya	SD	12 (12)	2015-03-22	Mdantsane Indoor Centre, East London, South Africa	Won vacant WBF Intercontinental super-featherweight title
40	Win	33–7	Themba Tshicila	TKO	2 (12)	2014-04-26	Tsolo Junction Hall, Qumbu, South Africa	
39	Loss	32–7	Edis Tatli	UD	12 (12)	2013-12-07	Barona Areena, Espoo, Finland	
38	Win	32–6	Takalani Ndlovu	UD	12 (12)	2013-09-21	Mdantsane Indoor Centre, East London, South Africa	
37	Loss	31–6	Paulus Moses	TKO	4 (12)	2013-03-02	Windhoek Country Club Resort, Windhoek, Namibia	For WBO International lightweight title
36	Loss	31–5	Sipho Taliwe	UD	12 (12)	2012-09-22	Emperors Palace, Kempton Park, South Africa	For WBC International super-featherweight title
35	Win	31–4	Vuyani Masondo	TKO	6 (8)	2012-06-23	New Way Sports Arena, Khayelitsha, South Africa	
34	Win	30–4	Cassius Baloyi	UD	12 (12)	2010-09-01	Carnival City, Brakpan, South Africa	Won vacant IBF super-featherweight title
33	Win	29–4	Jasper Seroka	TKO	6 (12)	2009-07-31	Nasrec Indoor Arena, Johannesburg, South Africa	
32	Win	28–4	Victor Manon	TKO	3 (8)	2008-08-29	Carousel Casino, Hammanskraal, South Africa	
31	Loss	27–4	Cassius Baloyi	MD	12 (12)	2008-04-12	North-West University Sports Complex, Mafikeng, South Africa	Lost IBF super-featherweight title
30	Win	27–3	Javier Osvaldo Alvarez	KO	9 (12)	2007-08-31	James Motlatsi Hall, Klerksdorp, South Africa	Retained IBF super-featherweight title
29	Win	26–3	Malcolm Klassen	SD	12 (12)	2007-04-20	Oliver Thambo Hall, Khayelitsha, South Africa	Won IBF super-featherweight title
28	Win	25–3	Roberto David Arrieta	UD	12 (12)	2006-12-08	Nasrec Indoor Arena, Johannesburg, South Africa	
27	Win	24–3	Jack Asis	UD	10 (10)	2006-06-30	Nasrec Indoor Arena, Johannesburg, South Africa	
26	Win	23–3	JR Sollano	KO	4 (10)	2005-12-09	Oliver Thambo Hall, Khayelitsha, South Africa	
25	Loss	22–3	Marco Antonio Barrera	KO	2 (12)	2005-04-09	Don Haskins Center, El Paso, Texas, U.S.	For WBC super-featherweight title
24	Win	22–2	Randy Suico	SD	12 (12)	2004-05-28	Orlando Community Center, Soweto, South Africa	
23	Win	21–2	Cristian Sebastian Paz	RTD	5 (10)	2004-02-13	Oliver Thambo Hall, Khayelitsha, South Africa	
22	Win	20–2	Elvis Makama	UD	12 (12)	2003-10-03	Oliver Thambo Hall, Khayelitsha, South Africa	Retained WBC International super-featherweight title
21	Win	19–2	Yuriy Voronin	UD	10 (10)	2003-07-18	Oliver Thambo Hall, Khayelitsha, South Africa	
20	Win	18–2	László Bognár	TKO	4 (12)	2003-04-25	Graceland Hotel Casino, Secunda, South Africa	Retained WBC International super-featherweight title
19	Win	17–2	Khululekile Sibeko	KO	7 (12)	2003-01-24	Oliver Thambo Hall, Khayelitsha, South Africa	Retained South African super-featherweight title
18	Win	16–2	Eric Odumase	TKO	10 (12)	2002-11-15	Graceland Hotel Casino, Secunda, South Africa	Retained WBC International super-featherweight title
17	Win	15–2	Ali Funeka	UD	12 (12)	2002-07-12	Oliver Thambo Hall, Khayelitsha, South Africa	Retained South African super-featherweight title
16	Win	14–2	Patrick Malinga	TKO	2 (12)	2001-11-16	Oliver Thambo Hall, Khayelitsha, South Africa	Won vacant WBC International super-featherweight title
15	Win	13–2	Wiseman Jim	KO	12 (12)	2001-04-01	Oliver Thambo Hall, Khayelitsha, South Africa	Retained South African super-featherweight title
14	Win	12–2	Irvin Buhlalu	UD	12 (12)	2000-08-06	Oliver Thambo Hall, Khayelitsha, South Africa	Retained South African super-featherweight title
13	Win	11–2	Irvin Buhlalu	UD	12 (12)	2000-02-06	Oliver Thambo Hall, Khayelitsha, South Africa	Retained South African super-featherweight title
12	Loss	10–2	Dean Pithie	UD	12 (12)	1999-12-14	Ryton Sports Connexion, Coventry, England, U.K.	For WBC International super-featherweight title
11	Win	10–1	Sakhumzi Magxwalisa	PTS	12 (12)	1999-07-25	New Way Hall, Khayelitsha, South Africa	Retained South African super-featherweight title
10	Win	9–1	Matthews Zulu	PTS	12 (12)	1999-03-14	New Way Hall, Khayelitsha, South Africa	Won vacant South African super-featherweight title
9	Loss	8–1	Mkhuseli Kondile	SD	12 (12)	1997-11-09	Wynberg Military Sports Centre, Cape Town, South Africa	For South African super-featherweight title
8	Win	8–0	Madose Ngozi	TKO	5 (8)	1996-08-25	Mdantsane Indoor Centre, East London, South Africa	
7	Win	7–0	Vusumzi Saule	PTS	6 (6)	1996-07-21	Wynberg Military Sports Centre, Cape Town, South Africa	
6	Win	6–0	Abram Mlandu	PTS	6 (6)	1996-05-12	Kimberley by Night Hotel, Kimberley, South Africa	
5	Win	5–0	Nkosana Tywakadi	TKO	2 (6)	1995-09-09	Mfuleni Hall, Khayelitsha, South Africa	
4	Win	4–0	Luvuyo Mngambi	PTS	6 (6)	1995-05-21	Lentegeur Civic Centre, Cape Town, South Africa	
3	Win	3–0	Thamsanqa Majaja	PTS	4 (4)	1994-10-23	Goodwood Showgrounds, Cape Town, South Africa	
2	Win	2–0	Nkosana Tywakadi	PTS	4 (4)	1994-05-15	Langa Civic Hall, Cape Town, South Africa	
1	Win	1–0	Siyabulela Manikevane	PTS	4 (4)	1994-03-06	Transnet Civic Hall, Philippi, Cape Town, South Africa	

== See also ==
- List of world super-featherweight boxing champions

Sporting positions
Regional boxing titles
Vacant Title last held by Sakhumzi Magxwalisa	South African super-featherweight champion 14 March 1999 – 2003; Vacated	Vacant Title next held by Ali Funeka
Vacant Title last held by Phillip N'dou	WBC International super-featherweight champion 16 November 2001 – 2003; Vacated	Vacant Title next held by Erik Morales
Vacant Title last held by Sebastien Cornu	WBF Intercontinental super-featherweight champion 22 March 2015 – 2015; Vacated	Vacant Title next held by Oscar Chauke
Vacant Title last held by Vusumzi Tyatyeka	WBF International lightweight champion 28 August 2015 – 2015; Vacated	Vacant Title next held by Jean Moraiti
Vacant Title last held by Xolisani Ndongeni	South African lightweight champion 16 October 2015 – 16 June 2017	Succeeded by Thomson Mokwana
World boxing titles
Preceded by Malcolm Klassen	IBF super-featherweight champion 20 April 2007 – 12 April 2008	Succeeded by Cassius Baloyi
Vacant Title last held by Robert Guerrero	IBF super-featherweight champion 1 September 2010 – 19 May 2011; Stripped	Vacant Title next held by Juan Carlos Salgado
