= Miguel Acosta (boxer) =

Venezuelan boxer

Personal information
- Nickname: Aguacerito
- Born: April 20, 1978 (age 48) Caracas, Venezuela
- Height: 5 ft 7 in (170 cm)
- Weight: Lightweight

Boxing career
- Reach: 71 in (180 cm)
- Stance: Orthodox

Boxing record
- Total fights: 40
- Wins: 29
- Win by KO: 23
- Losses: 9
- Draws: 2

Miguel Acosta (born April 20, 1978) is a Venezuelan former professional boxer who competed from 1999 to 2016. His nickname is "Aguacerito". He is the former World Boxing Association lightweight champion.

== Professional career ==
Acosta turned professional in 1999 and compiled a record of 26-3-2 before knocking out Paulus Moses on May 29, 2010 to become the new WBA lightweight champion. However Acosta lost the title in his first official defense against Brandon Ríos on February 26, 2011.

== Professional boxing record ==
40 fights	29 wins	9 losses
By knockout	23	4
By decision	6	5
Draws	2	

No.	Result	Record	Opponent	Type	Round, time	Date	Location	Notes
40	Loss	29–9–2	Antonio Orozco	KO	1 (10)	2016-03-25	Fantasy Springs Resort Casino, Indio, California, U.S.	
39	Loss	29–8–2	Michael Perez	UD	10 (10)	2015-01-20	2300 Arena, Philadelphia, Pennsylvania, U.S.	
38	Loss	29–7–2	Miguel Ángel González	UD	10 (10)	2013-05-02	Omega Products International, Corona, California, U.S.	
37	Loss	29–6–2	Art Hovhannisyan	SD	10 (10)	2012-07-20	Chumash Casino Resort, Santa Ynez, California, U.S.	
36	Loss	29–5–2	Richar Abril	UD	12 (12)	2011-10-22	Roberto Durán Arena, Panama City, Panama	For interim WBA lightweight title
35	Win	29–4–2	Luis Cardozo	TKO	3 (10)	2011-09-30	Coliseo Elías Chegwin, Barranquilla, Colombia	
34	Loss	28–4–2	Brandon Ríos	TKO	10 (12)	2011-02-26	Pearl Theater, Paradise, Nevada, U.S.	Lost WBA lightweight title
33	Win	28–3–2	Armando Cordoba	KO	1 (8)	2010-11-25	Pharaoh's Casino, Managua, Nicaragua	
32	Win	27–3–2	Paulus Moses	KO	6 (12)	2010-05-29	Kalahari Sands Hotel, Windhoek, Namibia	Won WBA lightweight title
31	Win	26–3–2	Urbano Antillón	TKO	9 (12)	2009-07-25	Palenque del Recinto Ferial, Nuevo Vallarta, Mexico	Won interim WBA lightweight title
30	Win	25–3–2	Dunis Linan	UD	10 (10)	2009-03-07	Centro Recreacional Yesterday, Turmero, Venezuela	
29	Win	24–3–2	Onalvi Sierra	TKO	4 (10)	2008-12-27	Barrio La Manga, Barranquilla, Colombia	
28	Win	23–3–2	Raimundo De Almeida	KO	3 (10)	2008-08-30	Gimnasio Ciudad de la Asunción, La Asunción, Venezuela	
27	Win	22–3–2	Ever Garcia Hernandez	TKO	2 (8)	2008-04-19	Port of Spain, Trinidad And Tobago	
26	Win	21–3–2	Anges Adjaho	SD	12 (12)	2007-10-13	Sears Centre, Hoffman Estates, Illinois, U.S.	
25	Win	20–3–2	Edinson Jimenez	UD	4 (4)	2007-06-29	Centro Recreacional Las Vegas, Barranquilla, Colombia	
24	Win	19–3–2	Gerardo Bermeo	KO	1 (12)	2006-11-27	Parque Naciones Unidas, Caracas, Venezuela	Retained WBA Fedecentro lightweight title
23	Win	18–3–2	José Alfaro	UD	10 (10)	2006-10-06	Pharaoh's Casino, Managua, Nicaragua	Won vacant WBA Fedecentro lightweight title
22	Win	17–3–2	Devinson Guerra	TKO	3 (10)	2005-12-17	Centro Recreacional Yesterday, Turmero, Venezuela	
21	Win	16–3–2	Jesus Perez	TKO	2 (10)	2005-11-26	Centro Recreacional Yesterday, Turmero, Venezuela	
20	Win	15–3–2	Pablo Osuna	KO	5 (10)	2005-10-15	Centro Recreacional Yesterday, Turmero, Venezuela	
19	Win	14–3–2	Pedro Verdu	TKO	5 (10)	2005-05-02	Centro Recreacional Yesterday, Turmero, Venezuela	
18	Win	13–3–2	Johnny Antequera	UD	10 (10)	2004-11-20	Centro Recreacional Yesterday, Turmero, Venezuela	
17	Win	12–3–2	Jose Zerpa	KO	5 (10)	2004-08-28	Turmero, Venezuela	
16	Win	11–3–2	Victor Julio Salgado	KO	2 (10)	2004-07-03	Coliseo de la Urbina, Petare, Venezuela	
15	Win	10–3–2	Jose Hernandez	KO	1 (10)	2004-04-12	Plaza Bicentenaria de Miraflores, Caracas, Venezuela	
14	Loss	9–3–2	William Morelo	PTS	10 (10)	2003-10-18	Bogotá, Colombia	
13	Loss	9–2–2	Angel Granados	KO	3 (10)	2003-05-28	Gimnasio Naciones Unidas, Caracas, Venezuela	
12	Loss	9–1–2	Gilberto Gonzalez	KO	2 (10)	2002-10-26	Centro Recreacional Yesterday, Turmero, Venezuela	
11	Win	9–0–2	Alejandro Sarabia	KO	5 (12)	2002-07-06	Hilton Gran Salon, Caracas, Venezuela	Won vacant WBA Fedecentro lightweight title
10	Win	8–0–2	Santos Rebolledo	MD	12 (12)	2002-03-18	Roger Ramos Gym, San Juan de Los Morros, Venezuela	Won vacant Venezuelan lightweight title
9	Win	7–0–2	Jose Zerpa	KO	6 (10)	2001-09-17	Parque Naciones Unidas, Caracas, Venezuela	
8	Win	6–0–2	Carlos Campos	TKO	7 (8)	2001-07-28	Maracaibo, Venezuela	
7	Win	5–0–2	Carlos Cabello	KO	2 (8)	2001-07-02	Parque Naciones Unidas, Caracas, Venezuela	
6	Win	4–0–2	Hector Gaurena	KO	2 (8)	2001-05-05	El Paraíso, Venezuela	
5	Win	3–0–2	Rafael Requez	KO	1 (6)	2001-03-19	El Paraíso, Venezuela	
4	Win	2–0–2	Eduardo Hernandez	TKO	2 (6)	2000-10-31	Turmero, Venezuela	
3	Win	1–0–2	Reinaldo Blanco	KO	1 (6)	2000-10-21	Turmero, Venezuela	
2	Draw	0–0–2	Alejandro Heredia	PTS	4 (4)	2000-05-25	Maturín, Venezuela	
1	Draw	0–0–1	Reinaldo Blanco	PTS	4 (4)	1999-11-02	Gimnasio José Joaquín Carrillo, Sebucán, Venezuela	

== See also ==
- List of world lightweight boxing champions

Sporting positions
Regional boxing titles
Vacant Title last held by Edgar Ilarraza	Venezuelan lightweight champion March 18, 2002 – 2002	Vacant Title next held by Luis Araguayan
Vacant Title last held by Richard Sierra	WBA Fedecentro lightweight Champion; July 6, 2002 – 2007	Vacant Title next held by Carlos Ramon Mairena
Vacant Title last held by Ammeth Diaz	WBA Fedecentro lightweight Champion; October 6, 2006 – 2002	Vacant Title next held by Carlos Urias Guerena
World boxing titles
New title	WBA lightweight champion Interim title July 25, 2009 – May 29, 2010; Won regular title	Vacant Title next held by Robert Guerrero
Preceded by Paulus Moses	WBA lightweight champion Regular title May 29, 2010 – February 26, 2011	Succeeded by Brandon Ríos
