= Paulus Moses =

Namibian boxer

Moses Paulus
Personal information
- Nickname: The Hitman
- Nationality: Namibian
- Born: Moses Ndapanda Paulus; 4 June 1978 (age 48) Okapya, Oshikuku, South West Africa
- Height: 5 ft 6 in (168 cm)
- Weight: Lightweight

Boxing career
- Reach: 72 1/2 in (184 cm)
- Stance: Orthodox

Boxing record
- Total fights: 51
- Wins: 40
- Win by KO: 25
- Losses: 10
- No contests: 1

Paulus Moses (born 4 June 1978) is a Namibian professional boxer who held the WBA (Regular) lightweight title from 2009 to 2010.

== Professional career ==
=== WBA lightweight champion ===
On 3 January 2009 Moses fought against the WBA Lightweight champion Yusuke Kobori in Pacifico Yokohama in Kanagawa Prefecture Yokohama City in Japan. Moses won the fight on points and became the new world champion. Moses defended that title on 25 July 2009 by unanimous decision over Takehiro Shimada.

=== Losing the title ===
The hitherto undefeated Moses was knocked out by challenger Miguel Acosta by a sixth-round knockout on 30 May 2010.

=== WBO lightweight title challenge ===
Moses challenged newly installed WBO Lightweight champion, Ricky Burns on 10 March 2012, he lost via unanimous decision.

== Professional boxing record ==
51 fights	40 wins	10 losses
By knockout	25	4
By decision	15	6
No contests	1	

No.	Result	Record	Opponent	Type	Round, time	Date	Location	Notes
51	Loss	40–10 (1)	Ruslan Selimyan	KO	3 (8)	11 May 2024	Yunost Sport Palace, Chelyabinsk, Russia	
50	Loss	40–9 (1)	Vladislav Ayriyan	TKO	6 (10)	26 Aug 2023	Pyramide, Kazan, Russia	
49	Loss	40–8 (1)	Karen Tonakanyan	TKO	2 (8)	18 Jun 2023	Hamlet Paturyan Sport Complex, Vagharshapat, Armenia	
48	Loss	40–7 (1)	Vildan Minasov	UD	8	19 Nov 2022	RCC Boxing Academy, Yekaterinburg, Russia	
47	Loss	40–6 (1)	Adlan Abdurashidov	UD	10	19 Sep 2019	Uvais Akhtaev Sports Palace, Grozny, Russia	
46	Loss	40–5 (1)	Emmanuel Tagoe	UD	12	20 Oct 2018	Bukom Boxing Arena, Accra, Ghana	For vacant WBO Africa lightweight title
45	Loss	40–4 (1)	Ray Beltrán	UD	12	16 Feb 2018	Grand Sierra Resort Theatre, Reno, Nevada, U.S.	For vacant WBO lightweight title
44	Win	40–3 (1)	Saidi Mundi	TKO	5 (12)	9 Sep 2017	Windhoek Country Club Resort, Windhoek, Namibia	Retained WBO Africa lightweight title
43	Win	39–3 (1)	Crispin Moliati	TKO	7 (12)	1 Apr 2017	Ramatex Factory, Windhoek, Namibia	Retained WBO Africa lightweight title
42	Win	38–3 (1)	Cosmas Cheka	TKO	5 (12)	8 Oct 2016	Windhoek Country Club Resort, Windhoek, Namibia	Retained WBO Africa lightweight title
41	Win	37–3 (1)	Thomson Mokwana	UD	12	6 Aug 2016	Windhoek Country Club Resort, Windhoek, Namibia	Won vacant WBO Africa lightweight title
40	NC	36–3 (1)	Thomson Mokwana	NC	2 (12)	11 Jun 2016	Ramatex Factory, Windhoek, Namibia	
39	Win	36–3	Sadiki Momba	UD	10	1 Aug 2015	Ramatex Factory, Windhoek, Namibia	
38	Loss	35–3	Malcolm Klassen	UD	12	20 Mar 2015	Ramatex Factory, Windhoek, Namibia	For vacant WBO International lightweight title
37	Win	35–2	Jorge Luis Rodriguez	TD	4 (12)	1 Mar 2014	Helao Nafidi, Oshikango, Namibia	
36	Win	34–2	Josenilson Dos Santos	KO	6 (12)	4 Oct 2014	Katutura Independence Arena, Windhoek, Namibia	
35	Win	33–2	Cristian Rafael Coria	UD	12	1 Mar 2014	Olufuko Centre, Outapi, Namibia	Retained WBO International lightweight title
34	Win	32–2	Leonardo Esteban Gonzalez	TKO	7 (12)	5 Oct 2013	Ramatex Factory, Windhoek, Namibia	Retained WBO International lightweight title
33	Win	31–2	Mzonke Fana	TKO	4 (12)	2 Mar 2013	Windhoek Country Club Resort, Windhoek, Namibia	Retained WBO International lightweight title
32	Win	30–2	Jeremias Ezequiel Castillo	UD	12	8 Dec 2012	Vineta Sports Centre, Swakopmund, Namibia	
31	Win	29–2	Cassius Baloyi	SD	10	28 Jul 2012	Ramatex Factory, Windhoek, Namibia	Won vacant WBO International lightweight title
30	Loss	28–2	Ricky Burns	UD	12	10 Mar 2012	Braehead Arena, Glasgow, Scotland	For WBO lightweight title
29	Win	28–1	Sidney Siqueira	UD	10	24 Sep 2011	Windhoek Country Club Resort, Windhoek, Namibia	
28	Win	27–1	Miguel Dario Lombardo	KO	1 (10)	19 Mar 2011	Windhoek Country Club Resort, Windhoek, Namibia	
27	Win	26–1	Sergio Omar Priotti	RTD	4 (10)	25 Nov 2010	Windhoek Country Club Resort, Windhoek, Namibia	
26	Loss	25–1	Miguel Acosta	KO	6 (12) 2:17	29 May 2010	Kalahari Sands Hotel, Windhoek, Namibia	Lost WBA (Regular) lightweight title
25	Win	25–0	Takehiro Shimada	UD	12	25 Jul 2009	Windhoek Country Club Resort, Windhoek, Namibia	Retained WBA (Regular) lightweight title
25	Win	24–0	Yusuke Kobori	UD	12	3 Jan 2009	Pacifico, Yokohama, Japan	Won WBA (Regular) lightweight title
23	Win	23–0	Yauheni Kruhlik	TKO	2 (8)	19 May 2008	Differ Ariake, Tokyo, Japan	
22	Win	22–0	Ephraim Nangenda	TKO	2 (10)	10 Nov 2007	Ongwediva Trade Fair Centre, Ongwediva, Namibia	
21	Win	21–0	Andriy Kudryavtsev	TKO	9 (12)	21 Aug 2007	Lenin Square, Donetsk, Ukraine	Retained WBA Inter-Continental lightweight title
20	Win	20–0	Beka Sadjaia	TKO	8 (12)	20 Mar 2007	Windhoek Country Club Resort, Windhoek, Namibia	Retained WBA Inter-Continental lightweight title
19	Win	19–0	Anthony Tshehla	TKO	8 (10)	10 Feb 2007	Oranjemund, Namibia	
18	Win	18–0	Frederic Gosset	UD	10	11 Nov 2006	Ongwediva Trade Fair Centre, Ongwediva, Namibia	
17	Win	17–0	Mihaita Mutu	UD	12	19 Aug 2006	Windhoek Country Club Resort, Windhoek, Namibia	Won vacant WBA Inter-Continental lightweight title
16	Win	16–0	Siviwe Ntshingana	TKO	7 (12)	10 Jun 2006	Park Station, Johannesburg, South Africa	
15	Win	15–0	Meshack Kondwani	PTS	12	20 Mar 2006	Windhoek Country Club Resort, Windhoek, Namibia	
14	Win	14–0	Peter Adams	TKO	3 (10)	1 Oct 2005	Ongwediva Trade Fair Centre, Ongwediva, Namibia	
13	Win	13–0	Simphiwe Joni	TKO	6 (12)	5 Aug 2005	Windhoek Country Club Resort, Windhoek, Namibia	
12	Win	12–0	Clinton Kinnear	TKO	10 (10)	7 May 2005	Hotel & Entertainment Centre, Swakopmund, Namibia	
11	Win	11–0	Shadrack Montsho	TKO	3 (8)	18 Mar 2005	Windhoek Country Club Resort, Windhoek, Namibia	
10	Win	10–0	Joseph Mathamelo	KO	1 (8)	27 Nov 2004	Sakaria Lawala Hall, Oranjemund, Namibia	
9	Win	9–0	David Shabangu	UD	8	9 Oct 2004	Windhoek Country Club Resort, Windhoek, Namibia	
8	Win	8–0	Lebogang Mboniswa	KO	1 (8)	16 Jun 2004	Sports Centre, Cullinan, South Africa	
7	Win	7–0	Ephraim Swandle	TKO	7 (8)	29 May 2004	Sammy Marks Square, Pretoria, South Africa	
6	Win	6–0	Shadrack Montsho	PTS	6	6 Mar 2004	Windhoek, Namibia	
5	Win	5–0	Lebogang Mboniswa	KO	4 (6)	20 Dec 2003	Ongwediva Trade Fair Centre, Ongwediva, Namibia	
4	Win	4–0	Joseph Mathabela	KO	1 (6)	18 May 2003	Carlton Centre, Johannesburg, South Africa	
3	Win	3–0	Mpumi Mashoka	PTS	4	22 Mar 2003	Hotel & Entertainment Centre, Swakopmund, Namibia	
2	Win	2–0	Frans Mokobane	TKO	3 (4)	22 Nov 2002	Portuguese Hall, Johannesburg, South Africa	
1	Win	1–0	Aaron Vilane	TKO	2 (4)	8 Nov 2002	Windhoek Country Club Resort, Windhoek, Namibia	

== See also ==
- List of world lightweight boxing champions

Sporting positions
Regional boxing titles
Vacant Title last held by Andrey Kudryavtsev	WBA Inter-Continental lightweight champion 19 August 2006 – 2007; Vacated	Vacant Title next held by Anthony Mezaache
New title	WBO International lightweight champion 28 July 2012 – September 2014; Stripped	Vacant Title next held by Malcolm Klassen
Vacant Title last held by Daud Yordan	WBO Africa lightweight champion 6 August 2016 – 2017; Vacated	Vacant Title next held by Simpiwe Vetyeka
World boxing titles
Preceded by Yusuke Kobori	WBA lightweight champion Regular title 3 January 2009 – 29 May 2010; Non-regular title from 10 January 2009 – 28 February 2009	Succeeded by Miguel Acosta
