= Shavkat Rakhimov =

Tajikistani boxer (born 1994)

Shavkat Rakhimov Шавкат Рахимов
Personal information
- Nickname: Shere Khan
- Nationality: Tajikistani
- Born: Шавкатджон Шокирович Рахимов; 14 August 1994 (age 32) Qurghon-Teppa, Khatlon Province, Tajikistan
- Height: 5 ft 8 1/2 in (174 cm)
- Weight: Super-featherweight

Boxing career
- Stance: Southpaw

Boxing record
- Total fights: 21
- Wins: 17
- Win by KO: 14
- Losses: 3
- Draws: 1
Medal record
Men's amateur boxing
Representing Tajikistan
World University Championships
| Bronze medal – third place | 2014 Yakutsk | 60 kg |
World Cup of Petroleum Countries
| Silver medal – second place | 2014 Beloyarsky | 60 kg |

Shavkatdzhon Shokirovich Rakhimov (born 14 August 1994) is a Tajikistani professional boxer. He held the International Boxing Federation (IBF) super-featherweight title from 2022 to 2023 and the International Boxing Organisation (IBO) super-featherweight title from 2017 to 2019.

== Amateur career ==
In 2013, Rakhimov won a gold medal at the Tajikistan National Championships in Dushanbe in June, and went on to compete at the 2013 World Boxing Championships in Almaty, Kazakhstan in October where he defeated Adilson Justino of Angola and Branimir Stankovic of Serbia but lost to Ermek Sakenov of Kyrgyzstan in the third round.

In 2014, Rakhimov won a gold medal at the Tajikistan National Championships in Khujand in May, and went on to win a bronze medal at the 2014 World University Boxing Championships in Yakutsk, Russia in September.

In 2015, Rakhimov won a gold medal at the 2015 Tajikistan National Championship in Dushanbe in March.

== Professional career ==
Shavkat Rakhimov made his professional debut in 2015 at the age of 21. He won the WBO Inter-Continental Youth super featherweight title in 2016, and by mid 2017 had amassed a record of 10 wins with all but two by stoppage.

On 20 June 2017, it was announced that Rakhimov would face off against David Saucedo on 9 September in Chelyabinsk, Russia for the vacant IBO world title, last held by Malcolm Klassen who was stripped in May due to inactivity. However, on 18 August, RCC Boxing announced that Saucedo had pulled out of the fight notifying the promoter that he would be unable to make the weight. He was replaced by Emanuel Lopez. On 9 September, Rakhimov defeated Emanuel Lopez by unanimous decision to win the IBO super featherweight title.

On 10 February 2018, Rakhimov defeated former IBF and IBO champion Malcolm Klassen to retain the IBO super featherweight title. He won the bout by technical knockout in the eighth round.

On 19 August, Rakhimov defended his title against Mexican boxer Robinson Castellanos, who had a recent victory over Yuriorkis Gamboa and had previously challenged for the WBA (Super) and interim WBC titles in 2017 and 2016, respectively. Rakhimov won the bout by technical knockout at 1:36 of the second round.

On 23 March 2019, Rakhimov defeated South African boxer Rofhiwa Maemu by knockout in the fourth round. Maemu suffered two knockdowns in the round after which he walked back to his corner signaling an end to the fight.

He faced Joseph Diaz for the IBF super-featherweight title at Fantasy Springs Resort Casino in Indio, California on 13 February 2021. Diaz had been the champion but failed to make the required weight and was therefore stripped of the title. The bout went ahead with Rakhimov still able to become champion with a win, but the fight ended in a majority draw.

Rakhimov got a second chance at the still vacant IBF super-featherweight title when he took on Zelfa Barrett at the Etihad Arena in Abu Dhabi on 5 November 2022. He survived being knocked to the canvas in round three to go on and floor his opponent twice in the ninth round with the referee stopping the contest after the second knockdown, handing Rakhimov the win, and the championship, by technical knockout.

He lost the title in his first defense against former champion, Joe Cordina, at Cardiff International Arena in Cardiff, Wales on 22 April 2023, losing via split decision.

Next he faced Eduardo Nunez in Dushanbe, Tajikistan, on 16 February 2024. Rakhimov lost by stoppage in the 11th round.

After almost a year away from the competitive boxing ring, Rakhimov moved up to lightweight and fought Justin Pauldo at Boeing Center at Tech Port in San Antonio, Texas, United States, on 8 February 2025, losing by knockout in the eighth round. He was taken from the ring on a stretcher and it was later revealed he suffered a bleed on the brain which required a two-night stay in hospital.

== Professional boxing record ==
| 21 fights | 17 wins | 3 losses |
|---|---|---|
| By knockout | 14 | 2 |
| By decision | 3 | 1 |
| Draws | 1 | |

| No. | Result | Record | Opponent | Type | Round, time | Date | Location | Notes |
|---|---|---|---|---|---|---|---|---|
| 21 | Loss | 17–3–1 | Justin Pauldo | KO | 8 (10), 1:53 | 8 Feb 2025 | Boeing Center at Tech Port, San Antonio, Texas, United States | |
| 20 | Loss | 17–2–1 | Eduardo Nunez | TKO | 11 (12), 0:16 | 16 Feb 2024 | Dushanbe, Tajikistan | |
| 19 | Loss | 17–1–1 | Joe Cordina | SD | 12 | 22 Apr 2023 | Cardiff International Arena, Cardiff, Wales | Lost IBF super-featherweight title |
| 18 | Win | 17–0–1 | Zelfa Barrett | TKO | 9 (12), 2:39 | 5 Nov 2022 | Etihad Arena, Abu Dhabi, UAE | Won vacant IBF super-featherweight title |
| 17 | Win | 16–0–1 | Sardor Muzaffarov | RTD | 2 (10), 3:00 | 11 Dec 2021 | KRK Uralets, Ekaterinburg, Russia | |
| 16 | Draw | 15–0–1 | Joseph Diaz | MD | 12 | 13 Feb 2021 | Fantasy Springs Resort Casino, Indio, California, U.S. | For vacant IBF super-featherweight title |
| 15 | Win | 15–0 | Azinga Fuzile | TKO | 8 (12), 2:26 | 29 Sep 2019 | Orient Theatre, East London, South Africa | |
| 14 | Win | 14–0 | Rofhiwa Maemu | RTD | 4 (12), 3:00 | 23 Mar 2019 | RCC Boxing Academy, Yekaterinburg, Russia | Retained IBO super-featherweight title |
| 13 | Win | 13–0 | Robinson Castellanos | TKO | 2 (12), 1:39 | 19 Aug 2018 | DIVS, Yekaterinburg, Russia | Retained IBO super-featherweight title |
| 12 | Win | 12–0 | Malcolm Klassen | TKO | 8 (12), 1:31 | 10 Feb 2018 | DIVS, Yekaterinburg, Russia | Retained IBO super-featherweight title |
| 11 | Win | 11–0 | Emanuel López | UD | 12 | 9 Sep 2017 | Traktor Ice Arena, Chelyabinsk, Russia | Won vacant IBO super-featherweight title |
| 10 | Win | 10–0 | Jimmy Paypa | TKO | 6 (10), 1:17 | 5 May 2017 | DIVS, Yekaterinburg, Russia | |
| 9 | Win | 9–0 | Rogelio Jun Doliguez | TKO | 5 (10), 2:15 | 18 Feb 2017 | Traktor Ice Arena, Chelyabinsk, Russia | Won vacant WBA Asia super-featherweight title |
| 8 | Win | 8–0 | Roldan Aldea | KO | 2 (8), 0:53 | 17 Dec 2016 | Yekaterinburg Expo, Yekaterinburg, Russia | Retained WBO Inter-Continental Youth super-featherweight title |
| 7 | Win | 7–0 | Jerry Castroverde | RTD | 4 (8), 3:00 | 18 Nov 2016 | DIVS, Yekaterinburg, Russia | Won vacant WBO Inter-Continental Youth super-featherweight title |
| 6 | Win | 6–0 | Farhod Oripov | TKO | 2 (6), 0:53 | 9 Sep 2016 | Traktor Ice Arena, Chelyabinsk, Russia | |
| 5 | Win | 5–0 | Alexander Saltykov | TKO | 2 (6), 0:42 | 6 May 2016 | DIVS, Yekaterinburg, Russia | |
| 4 | Win | 4–0 | Musaib Asadov | UD | 6 | 1 Apr 2016 | Sports Complex Leader, Berezovsky, Russia | |
| 3 | Win | 3–0 | Mirzhan Zhaxylykov | UD | 4 | 27 Feb 2016 | Arena (ex Rings), Yekaterinburg, Russia | |
| 2 | Win | 2–0 | Sergey Dyachkov | TKO | 1 (4), 2:47 | 17 Dec 2015 | Vodoley, Yekaterinburg, Russia | |
| 1 | Win | 1–0 | Visita Gairabekov | TKO | 2 (4), 2:32 | 6 Dec 2015 | Strelka 59 Club, Perm, Russia | |

== See also ==
- List of southpaw stance boxers
- List of world super-featherweight boxing champions

Sporting positions
Minor world boxing titles
| Vacant Title last held by Malcolm Klassen | IBO super-featherweight champion 9 September 2017 – 2019; Vacated | Vacant Title next held by Michael Magnesi |
Major world boxing titles
| Vacant Title last held by Joe Cordina | IBF super-featherweight champion 5 November 2022 – 22 April 2023 | Succeeded by Joe Cordina |
