= Meshack Kondwani =

Zimbabwean boxer (born 1974)

Meshack Kondwani is a retired boxer from Zimbabwe. Kondwani lost to Nicky Cook for the Commonwealth featherweight title. Kondwani also lost to Paulus Moses for the World Boxing Association Pan African featherweight title. His hometown is Harare.
