= Mzolisi Yoyo =

South African boxer

Personal information
- Nationality: (South Africa) South African
- Born: Mzolisi Yoyo; 25 December 1977 (age 48) Mdantsane, South Africa
- Weight: Lightweight

Boxing career

Boxing record
- Total fights: 13
- Wins: 11
- Win by KO: 8
- Losses: 2
- Draws: 0
- No contests: 0

Mzolisi Yoyo (born 25 December 1977) is a South African lightweight boxer based in Mdantsane. His record stands at 11 wins and 2 losses after 13 bouts.
