= Boxing at the 1992 Summer Olympics – Featherweight =

Featherweight boxing at the Games of the XXV Olympiad
- Venue: Pavelló Club Joventut Badalona
- Dates: 29 July – 9 August 1992
- Competitors: 31 from 31 nations

Medalists
1st place, gold medalist(s)		Andreas Tews	Germany
2nd place, silver medalist(s)		Faustino Reyes	Spain
3rd place, bronze medalist(s)		Ramaz Paliani	Unified Team
3rd place, bronze medalist(s)		Hocine Soltani	Algeria

The men's featherweight event was part of the boxing programme at the 1992 Summer Olympics. The weight class allowed boxers of up to 57 kilograms to compete. The competition was held from 29 July to 9 August 1992. 31 boxers from 31 nations competed.

== Medalists ==
Gold	Andreas Tews; Germany
Silver	Faustino Reyes; Spain
Bronze	Ramaz Paliani; Unified Team
Bronze	Hocine Soltani; Algeria

== Results ==
The following boxers took part in the event:

Rank	Name	Country
1	Andreas Tews	Germany
2	Faustino Reyes	Spain
3T	Ramaz Paliani	Unified Team
3T	Hocine Soltani	Algeria
5T	Park Deok-gyu	South Korea
5T	Victoriano Damián Sosa	Dominican Republic
5T	Eddy Suárez	Cuba
5T	Daniel Dumitrescu	Romania
9T	Sandagsürengiin Erdenebat	Mongolia
9T	Djamel Lifa	France
9T	Carlos Gerena	Puerto Rico
9T	Steven Chungu	Zambia
9T	Mohamed Soltani	Tunisia
9T	Somluck Kamsing	Thailand
9T	Heritovo Rakotomanga	Madagascar
9T	Rogério Dezorzi	Brazil
17T	Rodrigue Boucka	Gabon
17T	Kirkor Kirkorov	Bulgaria
17T	Charlie Baleña	Philippines
17T	Jorge Miguel Maglioni	Argentina
17T	Narendar Bisth Singh	India
17T	Paul Griffin	Ireland
17T	Eddy Sáenz	Nicaragua
17T	Li Chil-gun	North Korea
17T	Davis Lusimbo	Uganda
17T	Mike Strange	Canada
17T	Brian Carr	Great Britain
17T	Jamie Nicolson	Australia
17T	Wasesa Sabuni	Sweden
17T	Julian Wheeler	United States
17T	Steven Kevi	Papua New Guinea

=== First round ===
- Park Duk-Kyu (KOR) – BYE
- Sandagsuren Erdenebat (MGL) def. Rodrigue Boucka (GAB), 21:4
- Andreas Tews (GER) def. Kirkor Kirkorov (BUL), 9:5
- Djamel Lifa (FRA) def. Charlie Balena (PHI), 20:12
- Hocine Soltani (ALG) def. Jorge Maglione (ARG), RSCH-1 (02:31)
- Carlos Gerena (PUR) def. Narendar Bisth Singh (IND), 20:11
- Steven Chungu (ZAM) def. Paul Griffin (IRL), RSC-2 (00:26)
- Victoriano Damian (DOM) def. Eddy Sáenz (NCA), 23:14
- Eddy Suarez (CUB) def. Lee Chil-Gun (PRK), 20:5
- Mohamed Soltani (TUN) def. Davis Lusimbo (UGA), 13:8
- Somluck Kamsing (THA) def. Michael Strange (CAN), 11:9
- Faustino Reyes (ESP) def. Brian Carr (GBR), 22:10
- Daniel Dumitrescu (ROM) def. James Nicolson (AUS), RSCH-2 (01:53)
- Heritovo Rakotomanga (MAD) def. Wasesa Sabuni (SWE), 22:14
- Ramazan Palyani (EUN) def. Julian Wheeler (USA), 8:4
- Rogerio Brito (BRA) def. Steven Kevi (PNG), 20:6

=== Second round ===
- Park Duk-Kyu (KOR) def. Sandagsuren Erdenebat (MGL), 13:2
- Andreas Tews (GER) def. Djamel Lifa (FRA), 9:4
- Hocine Soltani (ALG) def. Carlos Gerena (PUR), 23:0
- Victoriano Damian (DOM) def. Steven Chungu (ZAM), 11:9
- Eddy Suarez (CUB) def. Mohamed Soltani (TUN), RSC-2 (02:53)
- Faustino Reyes (ESP) def. Somluck Kamsing (THA), 24:15
- Daniel Dumitrescu (ROM) def. Heritovo Rakotomanga (MAD), 18:8
- Ramazan Palyani (EUN) def. Rogerio Brito (BRA), 19:2

=== Quarterfinals ===
- Andreas Tews (GER) def. Duk-Kyu Park (KOR), 17:7
- Hocine Soltani (ALG) def. Victoriano Damian (DOM), 13:4
- Faustino Reyes (ESP) def. Eddy Suarez (CUB), 17:7
- Ramazan Palyani (EUN) def. Daniel Dumitrescu (ROM), 11:5

=== Semifinals ===
- Andreas Tews (GER) def. Hocine Soltani (ALG), 11:1
- Faustino Reyes (ESP) def. Ramazan Palyani (EUN), 14:9

=== Final ===
- Andreas Tews (GER) def. Faustino Reyes (ESP), 16:9
