= Boxing at the 1996 Summer Olympics – Featherweight =

Featherweight boxing at the Games of the XXVI Olympiad
- Venue: Alexander Memorial Coliseum
- Dates: 22 July – 4 August 1996
- Competitors: 31 from 31 nations

Medalists
1st place, gold medalist(s)		Somluck Kamsing	Thailand
2nd place, silver medalist(s)		Serafim Todorov	Bulgaria
3rd place, bronze medalist(s)		Pablo Chacón	Argentina
3rd place, bronze medalist(s)		Floyd Mayweather	United States

The featherweight class in the boxing at the 1996 Summer Olympics competition was the fourth-lightest class at the 1996 Summer Olympics in Atlanta, Georgia. The competition in the Alexander Memorial Coliseum started on 1996-07-20 and ended on 1996-08-04.

== Mayweather controversy ==
There was significant controversy surrounding judging of the fight between 19-year-old Floyd Mayweather of the United States and 27-year-old two-time Olympian Serafim Todorov of Bulgaria, with Todorov being awarded the semi-final bout which, according to many observers, was won by Mayweather. The U.S. team filed a protest over the Mayweather bout, claiming the judges were intimidated by Bulgaria's Emil Jetchev (head of the boxing officials) into favoring the Bulgarian Todorov, but it was rejected.

== Medalists ==
Gold	Somluck Kamsing; Thailand
Silver	Serafim Todorov; Bulgaria
Bronze	Pablo Chacón; Argentina
Bronze	Floyd Mayweather Jr. United States

== Results ==
Round of 32
Ibragimov (UZB)	RSC-2
Lamgen (MGL)	(02:16)
Burke (GBR)	9
Huste (GER)	13
Peden (AUS)	15
Achik (MAR)	7
Shestakov (UKR)	4
Todorov (BUL)	11
De Brito (BRA)	12
Bahari (INA)	3
Aragón (CUB)	9
Magjhound (ALG)	6
Mayweather (USA)	RSC-2
Tyleganov (KAZ)	(00:57)
Konamegui (CMR)	3
Gevorgyan (ARM)	10
Attah (NGR)	14
Ipera (PNG)	2
Nagy (HUN)	RSC-3
Kelman (BAR)	(01:36)
Gray (JAM)	5
Chacón (ARG)	6
Lebon (MRI)	9
Yağlı (TUR)	8
Paliani (RUS)	10
Sin (KOR)	7
Patton (CAN)	(02:55)
Ndou (RSA)	RSC-2
Seda (PUR)	2
Kamsing (THA)	13

Round of 16
Ibragimov (UZB)	4
Huste (GER)	8
Peden (AUS)	8
Todorov (BUL)	20
De Brito (BRA)	6
Aragón (CUB)	16
Mayweather (USA)	16
Gevorgyan (ARM)	3
Attah (NGR)	12
Nagy (HUN)	14
Chacón (ARG)	14
Lebon (MRI)	7
Ouzlian (GRE)	2
Paliani (RUS)	27
Ndou (RSA)	7
Kamsing (THA)	12

Quarterfinals
Huste (GER)	6
Todorov (BUL)	14
Aragón (CUB)	11
Mayweather (USA)	12
Nagy (HUN)	7
Chacón (ARG)	13
Paliani (RUS)	4
Kamsing (THA)	13

Semifinals
Todorov (BUL)	10
Mayweather (USA)	9
Chacón (ARG)	8
Kamsing (THA)	20

Final
Todorov (BUL)	5
Kamsing (THA)	8
