= 1991 European Amateur Boxing Championships =

Boxing competitions

- Host city: Gothenburg
- Country: Sweden
- Nations: 26
- Athletes: 191
- Dates: 7–12 May

The Men's 1991 European Amateur Boxing Championships were held in Gothenburg, Sweden from May 7 to 12. The 29th edition of the bi-annual competition, in which 191 fighters from 26 countries participated this time, was organised by the European governing body for amateur boxing, EABA.

== Medal winners ==
EVENT	(gold) GOLD	(silver) SILVER	(bronze) BRONZE
Light Flyweight (– 48 kilograms)	Ivailo Marinov; Bulgaria	Luigi Castiglione; Italy	Pál Lakatos; Hungary Paul Weir; Scotland
Flyweight (– 51 kilograms)	István Kovács; Hungary	Mario Loch; Germany	Daniel Petrov; Bulgaria Valentin Barbu; Romania
Bantamweight (– 54 kilograms)	Serafim Todorov; Bulgaria	Miguel Dias; Netherlands	Andreas Tews; Germany Jimmy Majanya; Sweden
Featherweight (– 57 kilograms)	(Republic of Ireland) Paul Griffin; Ireland	Faat Gatin; Soviet Union	Alan Vaughan; England Djamel Lifa; France
Lightweight (– 60 kilograms)	Vasile Nistor; Romania	Ayrat Chamatov; Soviet Union	Marco Rudolph; Germany Toncho Tonchev; Bulgaria
Light Welterweight (– 63.5 kilograms)	Konstantin Tszyu; Soviet Union	Andreas Zülow; Germany	(Socialist Federal Republic of Yugoslavia) Vukašin Dobrašinović; Yugoslavia Michele Piccirillo; Italy
Welterweight (– 67 kilograms)	Roberto Welin; Sweden	Vladimir Yereshchenko; Soviet Union	(Socialist Federal Republic of Yugoslavia) Mujo Bajrović; Yugoslavia György Mizsei; Hungary
Light Middleweight (– 71 kilograms)	Israyel Hakobkokhyan; Soviet Union	Torsten Schmitz; Germany	Jan Dydak; Poland Ole Klemetsen; Norway
Middleweight (– 75 kilograms)	Sven Ottke; Germany	Michal Franek; Czechoslovakia	Aleksandr Lebziak; Soviet Union Robert Buda; Poland
Light Heavyweight (– 81 kilograms)	Dariusz Michalczewski; Germany	Peter Zwezerijnen; Netherlands	Rostyslav Zaulychnyi; Soviet Union Marcel Beresoaie; Romania
Heavyweight (– 91 kilograms)	Arnold Vanderlyde; Netherlands	Georgios Stefanopoulos; Greece	Evgeni Sukalov; Soviet Union Peter Hart; Hungary
Super Heavyweight (+ 91 kilograms)	Yevgeni Belousov; Soviet Union	Andreas Schnieders; Germany	Svilen Rusinov; Bulgaria Brian Nielsen; Denmark

== MEDAL TABLE ==
Rank	Nation	Gold	Silver	Bronze	Total
1	Soviet Union (URS)	3	3	3	9
2	Germany (GER)	2	4	2	8
3	Bulgaria (BUL)	2	0	3	5
4	Netherlands (NED)	1	2	0	3
5	Hungary (HUN)	1	0	3	4
6	Romania (ROU)	1	0	2	3
7	Sweden (SWE)	1	0	1	2
8	Ireland (IRL)	1	0	0	1
9	Italy (ITA)	0	1	1	2
10	Czechoslovakia (TCH)	0	1	0	1
10	Greece (GRE)	0	1	0	1
12	Poland (POL)	0	0	2	2
12	Yugoslavia (YUG)	0	0	2	2
14	Denmark (DEN)	0	0	1	1
14	England (ENG)	0	0	1	1
14	France (FRA)	0	0	1	1
14	Norway (NOR)	0	0	1	1
14	Scotland (SCO)	0	0	1	1
Totals (18 entries)		12	12	24	48
