= Somluck Kamsing =

Thai boxer and Muay Thai fighter

Somluck Kamsing TBh, ChCh, ChM
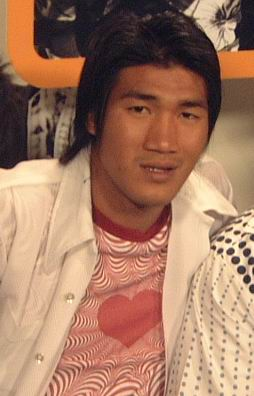
- Somluck in 2000
- Born: January 16, 1973 (age 53); Non Sombun, Ban Phai district (present-day Ban Haet district), Khon Kaen, Thailand
- Native name: สมรักษ์ คำสิงห์
- Other names: Pimaranlek Sitaran (พิมพ์อรัญเล็ก ศิษย์อรัญ); Somrak Phetcharoen (สมรักษ์ อ.เพชรเจริญ); Somrak Naronggym (สมรักษ์ ณรงค์ยิม); Somrak Thor.Thepsuthin (สมรักษ์ ท.เทพสุทิน)
- Nickname: Forever Boastful (โม้อมตะ); Bas (บาส)
- Height: 175 cm (5 ft 9 in)
- Division: Muay Thai: Mini Flyweight; Flyweight; Super Flyweight; Bantamweight; Super Bantamweight; Featherweight; Super Featherweight; Amateur Boxing: Featherweight; Lightweight
- Style: Muay Thai (Muay Femur); Amateur Boxing; Muay Boran
- Stance: Orthodox
- Team: Muay Thai: Narong Gym; Sit Arane Gym; Jocky Gym; Kietpetch Gym; Amateur Boxing: Thai Royal Navy
- Years active: Muay Thai: 1980–2014; Amateur Boxing: 1989–2004

Other information
- University: Royal Thai Navy Academy

Somluck Kamsing (or Somrak, Thai: สมรักษ์ คำสิงห์, born January 16, 1973), also known professionally as Pimaranlek Sitaran (Thai: พิมพ์อรัญเล็ก ศิษย์อรัญ), is a Thai retired Muay Thai fighter, amateur boxer, entertainer, and politician. He is a four-time Olympian in amateur boxing who won a gold medal in 1996. During the 1998 Asian Games in Bangkok, Thailand, Kamsing lit the torch during the Games' opening ceremony. His is also the younger brother of Somrot Kamsing, another retired Muay Thai fighter and Olympian in amateur boxing. Occasionally referred to as the "Uncrowned King", Somluck is widely considered one of the greatest Muay Thai fighters of all time despite never holding or fighting for a major stadium belt.

== Amateur boxing career ==
Somluck started to compete in amateur boxing in parallel with his Muay Thai career, he earned a bronze medal at the 1989 King's Cup and a gold medal in the 1995 edition. At the 1996 Summer Olympics he won a gold medal in the men's Featherweight category, beating Ramaz Paliani and Serafim Todorov among others, becoming the first Thai athlete to win a gold medal at the Olympics.

He also competed at the 2000 and 2004 Summer Olympics without winning any medals. Somluck placed second at the 1st AIBA Asian 2004 Olympic Qualifying Tournament in Guangzhou, China. In the final, he lost to North Korea's Kim Song-Guk. Having reached the final, however, he qualified for the Athens Games.

== Muay Thai career ==
At age 7, Somluck began training and fighting in Muay Thai. At 11, he moved to Bangkok to fight in the bigger stadiums under the name Pimaranlek Sitaran. Prior to switching to amateur boxing he was viewed as one of the best fighters in the sport. He didn't compete competitively in Thailand after making the switch, but he did take up the occasional fight against foreign fighters.

In 2012 he made a return to the major boxing stadiums, not as a serious fighter, but to fight other semi-retired legends in hopes of attracting people to the sport. He beat fellow legend Jomhod Kiatadisak on October 4, 2012 at Rajadamnern Stadium in a fight with the largest ever side bet in Muay Thai, 5.27 million baht on the line.

They fought again on December 7, 2012 on the Lumpinee stadium birthday show. This time Jomhod Kiatadisak won by points.

They fought third match with a 6 million baht side bet on February 7, 2013 and Somluck won again by decision.

However, he lost to American Nak Muay Chike Lindsay by unanimous decision in a modified Thai boxing Push Kick: World Stand Off in Pomona, California, on March 2, 2013.

Somluck fought to a draw with another legend, Yodwanpadet Sor Junlasen under special rules, at Rajadamnern Stadium on 2 April 2015. Somluck was only allowed to punch while Yodwanpadet could fight full Muay Thai.

== Titles and accomplishments ==
- Rajadamnern Stadium
  - 2026 Rajadamnern Stadium Hall of Fame

== Muay Thai record ==
Muay Thai Record
Date	Result	Opponent	Event	Location	Method	Round	Time
2014-04-25	Win	(Uzbekistan) Naimjon Tuhtaboyev	VIGO Champ Muay Marathon - Final	Phitsanulok, Thailand	Decision (Unanimous)	5	3:00
Wins the VIGO Champ Muay Marathon.
2014-04-25	Win	(Australia) Victor Nagbe	VIGO Champ Muay Marathon - Semifinal	Phitsanulok, Thailand	Decision	3	3:00
2014-02-28	Win	(United States) Warren Stavone	Petchyindee, Lumpinee Stadium	Bangkok, Thailand	Decision	5	3:00
2013-10-31	Win	(Republic of Ireland) Kamen Picken	VIGO Champ Muay Marathon	Hat Yai, Thailand	Decision	5	3:00
2013-08-30	Win	(Australia) Victor Nagbe	VIGO Champ Muay Marathon - Final	Chonburi, Thailand	Decision	3	3:00
Wins the VIGO Champ Muay Marathon Welterweight (147 lbs) Tournament.
2013-08-30	Win	(United States) Warren Stavone	VIGO Champ Muay Marathon - Semifinal	Chonburi, Thailand	Decision	3	3:00
2013-03-02	Loss	(United States) Chike Lindsay	Push Kick: World Stand Off	Pomona, California, USA	Decision (unanimous)	3	3:00
2013-02-07	Win	(Thailand) Jomhod Morbestkamala	Rajadamnern Stadium	Bangkok, Thailand	Decision (Unanimous)	5	3:00
2013-02-06	Win	(Thailand) Yodwanpadet Suwanwichit	Rajadamnern Stadium	Bangkok, Thailand	Decision	5	3:00
2012-12-07	Loss	(Thailand) Jomhod Morbestkamala	Lumpinee Champion Krikkrai, Lumpinee Stadium	Bangkok, Thailand	Decision (Unanimous)	5	3:00
2012-10-04	Win	(Thailand) Yodwanpadet Suwanwichit	Wanmitchai, Rajadamnern Stadium	Bangkok, Thailand	TKO (Doctor stoppage)	3	
2008-11-01	Win	(Georgia (country)) Davit Kiria	K-1 Ring Masters Olympia 2008	Istanbul, Turkey	Decision	3	3:00
Wins the K-1 Ring Masters Olympia 2008 Welterweight (147 lbs) Tournament title.
2008-11-01	Win	(Netherlands) Ajay Balgobind	K-1 Ring Masters Olympia 2008	Istanbul, Turkey	Decision	3	3:00
2008-08-16	Win	(England) Kieran Keddle	Dan Green Promotions	London, England	Decision	3	3:00
2005-12-05	Win	(Canada) Jowan Stringer	King's Birthday	Sanam Luang, Bangkok, Thailand	KO (Right elbow)	3	
2005-02-12	Win	(Italy) Christien Deiski	Onesongchai, Huamark Stadium	Bangkok, Thailand	Decision	5	
2004-11-06	Draw	(Japan) Hiroki Ishii	Titans 1st	Kitakyushu, Japan	Decision (Unanimous)	3	3:00
2000-12-05	Win	(France) Kamel Jemel	King's Birthday	Sanam Luang, Bangkok, Thailand	Decision (Unanimous)	5	3:00
1995-05-22	Win	(Thailand) Suwitlek Sor.Skawrat	Kiatphet, Lumpinee Stadium	Bangkok, Thailand	KO (Right high kick)	4	
1995-03-31	Win	(Thailand) Changnoi Sirimongkol	Daorungtvsi 7, Lumpinee Stadium	Bangkok, Thailand	Decision (Unanimous)	5	3:00
1992-10-27	Loss	(Thailand) Buakaw Por.Pisitchet	Daorungtvsi 7, Lumpinee Stadium	Bangkok, Thailand	KO (Knee to the body)	4	
1992-01-27	Win	(Thailand) Chamuekpet Hapalang	Phetthongkham, Rajadamnern Stadium	Bangkok, Thailand	Decision (Unanimous)	5	3:00
1991-08-27	Win	(Thailand) Panomrung Sit Sor.Wor.Por.	Daorungtvsi 7, Lumpinee Stadium	Bangkok, Thailand	Decision (Unanimous)	5	3:00
1991-06-11	Win	(Thailand) Boonlai Sor.Thanikul	Daorungtvsi 7, Lumpinee Stadium	Bangkok, Thailand	Decision (Unanimous)	5	3:00
1991-05-17	Win	(Thailand) Boonlai Sor.Thanikul	Thahansuea, Lumpinee Stadium	Bangkok, Thailand	Decision (Unanimous)	5	3:00
1991-03-26	Win	(Thailand) Kukrit Sor.Nayayarm	Daorungtvsi 7, Lumpinee Stadium	Bangkok, Thailand	Decision (Unanimous)	5	3:00
1991-02-01	Win	(Thailand) Darathong Kiatmuangtran	Lumpinee Stadium	Bangkok, Thailand	Decision	5	3:00
1991-01-22	Win	(Thailand) Kukrit Sor.Nayayarm	Daorungtvsi 7, Lumpinee Stadium	Bangkok, Thailand	Decision (Unanimous)	5	3:00
1990-11-30	Loss	(Thailand) Panomrung Sit Sor.Wor.Por.	Lumpinee Stadium	Bangkok, Thailand	Decision	5	3:00
1990-10-26	Win	(Thailand) Boonlai Sor.Thanikul	Daorungtvsi 7, Lumpinee Stadium	Bangkok, Thailand	Decision	5	3:00
1990-08-07	Loss	(Thailand) Boonlai Sor.Thanikul	Daorungtvsi 7 + Onesongchai, Lumpinee Stadium	Bangkok, Thailand	Decision (Unanimous)	5	3:00
1990-06-15	Win	(Thailand) Namkabuan Nongkeepahuyuth	Daorungtvsi 7, Lumpinee Stadium	Bangkok, Thailand	Decision (Unanimous)	5	3:00
1990-03-20	Win	(Thailand) Pimai Or.Yutthanakorn	Thahansuea, Lumpinee Stadium	Bangkok, Thailand	Decision (Unanimous)	5	3:00
1989-12-29	Win	(Thailand) Dennuea Denmolee	Daorungtvsi 7, Lumpinee Stadium	Bangkok, Thailand	Decision (Unanimous)	5	3:00
1989-09-15	Win	(Thailand) Samernoi Tor.Boonlert	Thahansuea, Lumpinee Stadium	Bangkok, Thailand	Decision (Unanimous)	5	3:00
1989-08-25	Win	(Thailand) Sukkasem Detchaowit	Daorungtvsi 7, Lumpinee Stadium	Bangkok, Thailand	Decision (Unanimous)	5	3:00
1989-07-21	Win	(Thailand) Sakchai Wongwianyai	Daorungtvsi 7, Lumpinee Stadium	Bangkok, Thailand	Decision (Unanimous)	5	3:00
1989-05-23	Win	(Thailand) Chartchainoi Chaorai-Oi	Daorungtvsi 7, Lumpinee Stadium	Bangkok, Thailand	Decision (Unanimous)	5	3:00
1989-02-28	Loss	(Thailand) Rungroj Singhlanthong	Daorungtvsi 7, Lumpinee Stadium	Bangkok, Thailand	Decision (Unanimous)	5	3:00
1989-01-24	Win	(Thailand) Thanongdet Kiatpayathai	Lumpinee Stadium	Bangkok, Thailand	Decision (Unanimous)	5	3:00
1988-12-30	Win	(Thailand) King Sor.Ploenchit	Daorungtvsi 7, Lumpinee Stadium	Bangkok, Thailand	Decision (Unanimous)	5	3:00
1988-12-03	Loss	(Thailand) Panomrung Sit Sor.Wor.Por.	Lumpinee Stadium	Bangkok, Thailand	Decision	5	3:00
1988-10-14	Loss	(Thailand) Chainoi Muangsurin	Jatuchok, Lumpinee Stadium	Bangkok, Thailand	Decision (Unanimous)	5	3:00
1988-09-20	Win	(Thailand) Warunee Sor.Ploenchit	Sueathahan, Lumpinee Stadium	Bangkok, Thailand	Decision (Unanimous)	5	3:00
1988-08-02	Win	(Thailand) Samad Pukrongfah		Thailand	KO (spinning back elbow)	3	
1988-05-10	Win	(Thailand) Wuttichai Sor.Ploenchit	Lumpinee Stadium	Bangkok, Thailand	Decision	5	3:00
1988-04-30	Win	(Thailand) Kahao Kor.Pongkiat		Phatthalung province, Thailand	Decision	5	3:00
1988-03-22	Win	(Thailand) Panomrung Sit Sor.Wor.Por.	Daorungtvsi 7, Lumpinee Stadium	Bangkok, Thailand	Decision	5	3:00
1988-02-06	Win	(Thailand) Panomrung Sit Sor.Wor.Por.	Lumpinee Stadium	Bangkok, Thailand	Decision	5	3:00
1988-01-08	Loss	(Thailand) Panomrung Sit Sor.Wor.Por.	Lumpinee Stadium	Bangkok, Thailand	Decision	5	3:00
1987-	Win	(Thailand) Pankao Sor.Thanikul	Rajadamnern Stadium	Bangkok, Thailand	Decision	5	3:00
1987-11-30	Loss	(Thailand) Panomrung Sit Sor.Wor.Por.	Lumpinee Stadium	Bangkok, Thailand	Decision	5	3:00
1987-11-03	Won	(Thailand) Samart Witthayakonsong	Lumpinee Stadium	Bangkok, Thailand	Decision	5	3:00
1987-	Loss	(Thailand) Noppadet Narumon	Lumpinee Stadium	Bangkok, Thailand	Decision	5	3:00
1987-09-29	Win	(Thailand) Sananchai Lukmongchol	Thahansuea, Lumpinee Stadium	Bangkok, Thailand	Decision (Unanimous)	5	3:00
1987-	Win	(Thailand) Sananchai Lukmongchol	Lumpinee Stadium	Bangkok, Thailand	Decision	5	3:00
1987-	Win	(Thailand) Samad Pukrongfa	Lumpinee Stadium	Bangkok, Thailand	KO (Elbow)	3	
1987-	Win	(Thailand) Panomrung Sit Sor.Wor.Por.	Lumpinee Stadium	Bangkok, Thailand	Decision	5	3:00
1987-07-28	Win	(Thailand) Rungroj Sor.Sakpai	Daorungtvsi 7, Lumpinee Stadium	Bangkok, Thailand	Decision	5	3:00
1985-	Win	(Thailand) Boby Chor Wigo	Rajadamnern Stadium	Bangkok, Thailand	Decision	5	3:00
1985-	Win	(Thailand) Lukjit Sitlongkyu	Rajadamnern Stadium	Bangkok, Thailand	Decision	5	3:00
1985-	Win	(Thailand) Superneng Luksamrong	Kiatsingnoi, Rajadamnern Stadium	Bangkok, Thailand	Decision	5	3:00
Somrak's first fight in a major Bangkok stadium.
1985-	Win	(Thailand) Rungruang Kiatanan	Omnoi Stadium	Samut Sakhon, Thailand	Decision	5	3:00
1985-	Win	(Thailand) Kaewannoi Sor Kanokrat	Omnoi Stadium	Samut Sakhon, Thailand	KO		
1985-	Win	(Thailand) Sakmongkol Sithchuchok		Bo Rai District, Thailand	Decision	5	3:00
1985-	Win	(Thailand) Sutipong Sitsaenma	Rangsit Stadium	Rangsit, Thailand	Decision	5	3:00
1985-	Win	(Thailand) Prasathong Singkumpha	Rangsit Stadium	Rangsit, Thailand	KO		
1985-	Win	(Thailand) Majurat Sitkrupop	Samrong Stadium	Samut Prakan, Thailand	KO		
1985-	Win	(Thailand) Dejrit Sor.Ploenchit	Samrong Stadium	Samut Prakan, Thailand	Decision	5	3:00
1985-	Win	(Thailand) Rungroj Sor.Ploenchit	Samrong Stadium	Samut Prakan, Thailand	Decision	5	3:00
1985-	Win	(Thailand) Lukrothong Petchriracha	Samrong Stadium	Samut Prakan, Thailand	Decision	5	3:00
1985-	Win	(Thailand) Chalong Silpakorn	Samrong Stadium	Samut Prakan, Thailand	Decision	5	3:00
1985-	Win	(Thailand) Saylamlek Muangrainu	Samrong Stadium	Samut Prakan, Thailand	Decision	5	3:00
1985-	Win	(Thailand) Singnoi Luksamrong	Samrong Stadium	Samut Prakan, Thailand	Decision	5	3:00
1985-	Win	(Thailand) Pichit Charoenpak		Chonburi, Thailand	Decision	5	3:00
1985-	Win	(Thailand) Sorapong Por Pongsawang		Khon Kaen Province, Thailand	Decision	5	3:00
Legend: Win Loss Draw/No contest Notes

== Amateur boxing record ==
Amateur Boxing Record (Incomplete)
Date	Result	Opponent	Event	Location	Method	Round	Time
2004-08-16	Loss	(Canada) Benoit Gaudet	2004 Summer Olympics Featherweight Round of 32	Athens, Greece	Points (17:32)	4	2:00
2004-03-24	Loss	(North Korea) Kim Song-guk	Asian 2004 Olympic Qualifying Tournament Featherweight Final	Guangzhou, China	Points (13:21)	4	2:00
2004-03-23	Win	(China) Xiong Zhaorong	Asian 2004 Olympic Qualifying Tournament Featherweight Semifinal	Guangzhou, China	Points (19:13)	4	2:00
2004-03-22	Win	(Pakistan) Sohail Baloch	Asian 2004 Olympic Qualifying Tournament Featherweight Quarterfinal	Guangzhou, China	Points (20:19)	4	2:00
2004-03-21	Win	(Afghanistan) Abdul Hamid Rahimi	Asian 2004 Olympic Qualifying Tournament Featherweight Preliminary	Guangzhou, China	RSCO		
2002-06-24	Loss	(Malaysia) Adnan Yusoh	2002 Asian Amateur Boxing Championships, Lightweight Semifinal	Seremban, Malaysia	Points (5:23)	4	2:00
Wins the Bronze Medal at Lightweight (-60 kg) in Asian Amateur Boxing Championships.
2002-06-22	Win	(Philippines) Anthony Igusquiza	2002 Asian Amateur Boxing Championships, Lightweight Quarterfinal	Seremban, Malaysia	Points (17:13)	4	2:00
2002-06-21	Win	(Uzbekistan) Dilshod Mahmudov	2002 Asian Amateur Boxing Championships, Lightweight Preliminary	Seremban, Malaysia	Points (13:10)	4	2:00
2002-04-10	Win	(Thailand) Terdsak Jandang	25th King's Cup International Amateur Boxing Tournament, Lightweight Final	Bangkok, Thailand	Points (24:6)	4	2:00
Wins the 25th King's Cup International Amateur Boxing Tournament.
2002-04-08	Win	(Japan) Takashi Uchiyama	25th King's Cup International Amateur Boxing Tournament, Lightweight Semifinal	Bangkok, Thailand	Points (18:3)	4	2:00
2002-04-06	Win	(Sri Lanka) Nilantha Walisundara	25th King's Cup International Amateur Boxing Tournament, Lightweight ???	Bangkok, Thailand	Points (18:1)	4	2:00
2002-04-04	Win	(India) Reji Ramanand	25th King's Cup International Amateur Boxing Tournament, Lightweight ???	Bangkok, Thailand	Points (10:4)	4	2:00
2000-09-27	Loss	(United States) Ricardo Juárez	2000 Summer Olympics Featherweight Quarterfinal	Sydney, Australia	RSC	4	1:52
2000-09-23	Win	(Uzbekistan) Tulkunbay Turgunov	2000 Summer Olympics Featherweight Round of 16	Sydney, Australia	Points (7:2)	4	2:00
2000-09-18	Win	(Colombia) Andres Ledesma	2000 Summer Olympics Featherweight Round of 32	Sydney, Australia	RSC	4	0:37
1998-12-18	Win	(Uzbekistan) Tulkunbay Turgunov	1998 Asian Games, Featherweight Final	Bangkok, Thailand	Points (8:3)	4	2:00
Wins the Gold Medal of Boxing at Featherweight (-54 kg) in 1998 Asian Games.
1998-12-15	Win	(Japan) Norihisa Tomimoto	1998 Asian Games, Featherweight Semifinal	Bangkok, Thailand	Points (16:2)	4	2:00
1998-12-13	Win	(Mongolia) Jamgany Narantsogt	1998 Asian Games, Featherweight Quarterfinal	Bangkok, Thailand	Points (20:3)	4	2:00
1998-12-08	Win	(South Korea) Lim Jae-hwan	1998 Asian Games, Featherweight Preliminary	Bangkok, Thailand	Points (17:6)	4	2:00
1996-08-04	Win	(Bulgaria) Serafim Todorov	1996 Summer Olympics Featherweight Final	Atlanta, United States	Points (8:5)	4	2:00
Wins the Gold Medal at Featherweight (-54 kg) in 1996 Summer Olympics.
1996-08-02	Win	(Argentina) Pablo Chacón	1996 Summer Olympics Featherweight Semifinal	Atlanta, United States	Points (20:8)	4	2:00
1996-07-31	Win	(Russia) Ramaz Paliani	1996 Summer Olympics Featherweight Quarterfinal	Atlanta, United States	Points (13:4)	4	2:00
1996-07-27	Win	(South Africa) Phillip Ndou	1996 Summer Olympics Featherweight Round of 16	Atlanta, United States	Points (12:7)	4	2:00
1996-07-22	Win	(Puerto Rico) Luis Seda	1996 Summer Olympics Featherweight Round of 32	Atlanta, United States	Points (13:2)	4	2:00
1995-12-17	Win	(Philippines) Eric Canoy	1995 SEA Games Featherweight Final	Chiang Mai, Thailand	Points	4	2:00
Wins the Gold Medal at Featherweight (-54 kg) in 1995 SEA Games.
1995-12-13	Win	(Laos) Souksavane Sengthavisouk	1995 SEA Games Featherweight Semifinal	Chiang Mai, Thailand	RSC	3	
1995-12-13	Win	(Indonesia) Nemo Bahari	1995 SEA Games Featherweight Quarterfinal	Chiang Mai, Thailand	Points (18:6)	4	2:00
1995-02-	Win	(Thailand) Pongsith Wiangwiset	20th King's Cup International Amateur Boxing Tournament, Featherweight Final	Bangkok, Thailand	Points (23:9)	4	2:00
Wins the 20th King's Cup International Amateur Boxing Tournament.
1994-10-13	Win	(Pakistan) Zaigham Maseel	1994 Asian Games, Featherweight Final	Hiroshima, Japan	Points (8:5)	4	2:00
Wins the Gold Medal at Featherweight (-54 kg) in 1994 Asian Games.
1994-10-11	Win	(Indonesia) Nemo Bahari	1994 Asian Games, Featherweight Semifinal	Hiroshima, Japan	Points (12:6)	4	2:00
1994-10-09	Win	(Uzbekistan) Muhammad Abdullaev	1994 Asian Games, Featherweight Quarterfinal	Hiroshima, Japan	Points (9:3)	4	2:00
1994-10-06	Win	(Myanmar) Kyaw Min	1994 Asian Games, Featherweight Preliminary	Hiroshima, Japan	Points (13:0)	4	2:00
1994-01-21	Win	(Indonesia) Nemo Bahari	1994 Asian Amateur Boxing Championships, Featherweight Final	Tehran, Iran	Points	4	2:00
Wins the Gold Medal at Featherweight (-54 kg) in Asian Amateur Boxing Championships.
1994-01-18	Win	(Chinese Taipei) Hsueh Yao Shin	1994 Asian Amateur Boxing Championships, Featherweight Semifinal	Tehran, Iran	Points	4	2:00
1994-01-16	Win	(Iran) Reza Samadi	1994 Asian Amateur Boxing Championships, Featherweight Quarterfinal	Tehran, Iran	RSCO	1	
1992-08-02	Loss	(Spain) Faustino Reyes	1992 Summer Olympics Featherweight Round of 16	Barcelona, Spain	Points (15:24)	4	2:00
1992-07-29	Win	(Canada) Michael Strange	1992 Summer Olympics Featherweight Round of 32	Barcelona, Spain	Points (11:9)	4	2:00
1992-03-02	Loss	(South Korea) Duk-Kyu Park	1992 Asian Amateur Boxing Championships, Featherweight Semifinal	Bangkok, Thailand	Points	4	2:00
Wins the Bronze Medal at Featherweight (-54 kg) in Asian Amateur Boxing Championships.
1992-02-29	Win	(India) Vankats Devanand	1992 Asian Amateur Boxing Championships, Featherweight Quarterfinal	Bangkok, Thailand	Points	4	2:00
1992-02-27	Win	(Philippines) Charlie Balena	1992 Asian Amateur Boxing Championships, Featherweight Preliminary	Bangkok, Thailand	Points	4	2:00
Legend: Win Loss Draw/No contest Notes

== Movie career ==
He has later played athletic roles in Thai movies, notably Kerd ma lui. He appeared in Fearless with Jet Li, although his scene was cut from the international release of the film. However, a special version was shown in cinemas in Thailand in March 2006, in which his scene was restored. He portrayed a boxer who challenges Jet Li's character. He was seen recently on screens playing a Muay Thai trainer in A Prayer Before Dawn.

== Singing career ==
He also made his debut as a singer in 2006, performing at the Pattaya Music Festival and releasing an album and a music video (featuring fellow boxers Khaosai Galaxy and Samart Payakaroon as a shy man being approached by a young woman).

== Filmography ==
=== Dramas ===
Year	Thai title	Title	Role	Network	Notes	With
1996	นายขนมต้ม	Nai Khanom Tom	Nai-Khanom-Tom	Channel 7		Kunranat Kunrapreeyawat
2001	เพชรตัดเพชร		Tri	Channel 7		
2005	ทางหลวงทางรัก			Channel 3		
2010	ศิราพัชร ดวงใจนักรบ		Ja-Seang	Channel 3		
2010	นักสู้พันธุ์ข้าวเหนียว		I-Ling-Lom	Channel 7		
2011	เสือสั่งฟ้า	Suea Sung Fah	Kra-Thing	Channel 7		
2015	สิงห์สี่แคว (ชาติเจ้าพระยา ภาค 2)		Kom	Channel 3		
2015	ลิเกหมัดสั่ง		Kom	Channel 8		
2017	แหวนปราบมาร		Pu-Ti-Wa-Yu	Channel 7		
2017	นายฮ้อยทมิฬ		Subin	Channel 7		
2018	แม่สื่อจอมป่วน		Joke	Channel 7		
2018	นักสู้สะท้านฟ้า		Kru-Dang	Channel 7		
2018	รักสุดปลายนวม		Somsak	Channel 7		
2019	มธุรสโลกันตร์		Rung	Channel 7		
2021	แด่คุณพ่อด้วยแข้งขวา	Dae Pho Duai Khaeng Khwa	Na Man	Thairath TV		
2023	ข้าวเหนียวทองคำ	Khao Niao Thong Kham	Kem	One 31		

=== Series ===
Year	Thai title	Title	Role	Network	Notes	With
2019	Sucker Kick สู้ตาย!! นายกระจับ	Sucker Kick	Hia-Song	LINE TV		

=== Sitcom ===
Year	Thai title	Title	Role	Network	Notes	With
2007	บางรักซอย 9 ตอนที่ 204 ยังไงก็รัก	Bang Rak Soi 9		Channel 9 MCOT HD	Invited actor	
2021	กู้ภัยอาสารัก		Hia Tu	7HD35		

=== Film ===
Year	Thai title	Title	Role	Note	Reference
2003	หลอน	Soul	Tid Ken		
2003	อีโล้นซ่าส์ โครงการ 2				
2004	เกิดมาลุย	Born to Fight	Tup		
2006	จอมคนผงาดโลก	Fearless (2006 film)	Beicha		
2008	ซอยคาวบอย	Soi Cowboy (film)	Uncle		
2011	กรุงเทพแก้แค้น	Bangkok Revenge	Police		
2012	ทะเลาะวิวาท a.k.a. (ต่อสู้กับปลา)	Brawl a.k.a. (Fighting Fish)	Police Inspector		
2017	อีปึก อัศจรรย์วันแห่งศรัทธา		Hou-Na-To		
2017	คำอธิษฐานก่อนรุ่งอรุณ	A Prayer Before Dawn (film)	Suthin		
2018	ขุนบันลือ		Rang		
2021	คุณชายใหญ่	Master Petchtai	farmer		
2021	Love เลย 101	Love Loei 101			

=== Advertising ===
Year	Thai title	Title	Notes	With
2000	เครื่องดื่มเอ็ม-150	M-150		
2003	ไทเบียร์	Thai Beer		
2005	มาสด้า ไฟเตอร์	Mazda Fighter		
2013	AIS 3G 2100 ชุด James And The Gang	AIS 3G 2100 ชุด James And The Gang		
2017	ปุ๋ยตรานกปากห่าง			
2020	นมกล่องยูเอชทีตราหมี	Panda Brand UHT Box Milk		Family

== Personal life ==
Somluck married Saowanee Kamsing, a fellow youth athlete. The two first met while training as provincial athletes in a youth sports camp. He was a young amateur boxer, while she was a basketball player. Saowanee is the younger sister of Pongsith Wiangwiset, a fellow boxer from Khon Kaen and a close friend of Somluck. Interestingly, Somluck's younger sister is also married to Pongsith, making the two families closely connected by both friendship and marriage.

Saowanee suffered a miscarriage during her first pregnancy while Somluck was competing in the 1996 Summer Olympics. The couple later had two children: a daughter, Rakwanee Kamsing (born in 2000), and a son, Phuwarak Kamsing (born in 2007). Rakwanee is now an actress and YouTuber.

Somluck formerly served as a naval officer and was an amateur boxer representing the Royal Thai Navy (RTN), reaching the rank of Lieutenant (Lt). He was discharged from service in 2018 after being declared bankrupt by a court order.

== Sexual assault conviction ==
On 23 January 2025, Somluck was convicted by a court in Khon Kaen province of abducting a minor for indecent purposes, committing an indecent act against a minor by using force, and attempted rape in a case involving a 17-year-old girl whom he brought to a hotel room from a bar in Khon Kaen in 2023. He was sentenced to a prison term of three years, one month and 10 days, and was also ordered to pay 120,000 baht ($3,525) to the victim and 50,000 baht ($1,470) to her guardians. Somluck denied the charges.

Olympic Games
Preceded by Vissanu Sophanich	Flagbearer for Thailand; Sydney 2000	Succeeded by Paradorn Srichaphan
