= Djamel Lifa =

French boxer (born 1969)

Personal information
- Born: 1 March 1969 (age 57)
Medal record
Men's Boxing
Representing France
European Amateur Championships
Bronze medal – third place	1991 Gothenburg	Featherweight

Djamel Lifa (born 1 March 1969) is a French former professional boxer who competed from 1992 to 2001, holding the European super featherweight title from 1997 to 1998. As an amateur, he represented his country at the 1992 Summer Olympics.

== Amateur career ==
Lifa claimed a record of 120-16-4 (13 KO) and competed at the 1992 Summer Olympics in Barcelona, Spain. In 1991 he won the bronze medal at the European Championships, held in Gothenburg, Sweden.

=== Amateur Highlights ===
- 1989, 1990 French Featherweight Champion
- 1989 European Championships in Athens as a Featherweight. Lost to Kirkor Kirkorov (Bulgaria) points
- 1989 World Championships in Moscow as a Featherweight. Results were:
  - Defeated Saoud Al Mowaizri (Kuwait) points
  - Defeated Sandro Casamonica (Italy) points
  - Lost to Arnaldo Mesa (Cuba) points
- 1990 French Featherweight Champion
- 1991 3rd place at French Championships as a Featherweight, losing on points to Eddy Suarez
- 1991 3rd place at European Championships as a Featherweight at Gothenburg, Sweden. Results were:
  - Defeated Zoltan Kalocsai (Hungary) points
  - Defeated Kirkor Kirkorov (Bulgaria) points
  - Lost to Faat Gatin (Soviet Union) points
- 1991 competed as a Featherweight at the World Championships in Sydney, Australia. Results were:
  - Defeated John Wallace (New Zealand) TKO 3
  - Lost to Kirkor Kirkorov (Bulgaria) points
- 1992 Represented France as a Featherweight at Barcelona Olympic Games. Results were:
  - Defeated Charlie Balena (Philippines) points
  - Lost to Andreas Tews (Germany) 4-9

== Professional career ==
As a professional Lifa had forty bouts, winning 35 (14 ko's) of them.
