= Pablo Chacón =

Argentine boxer

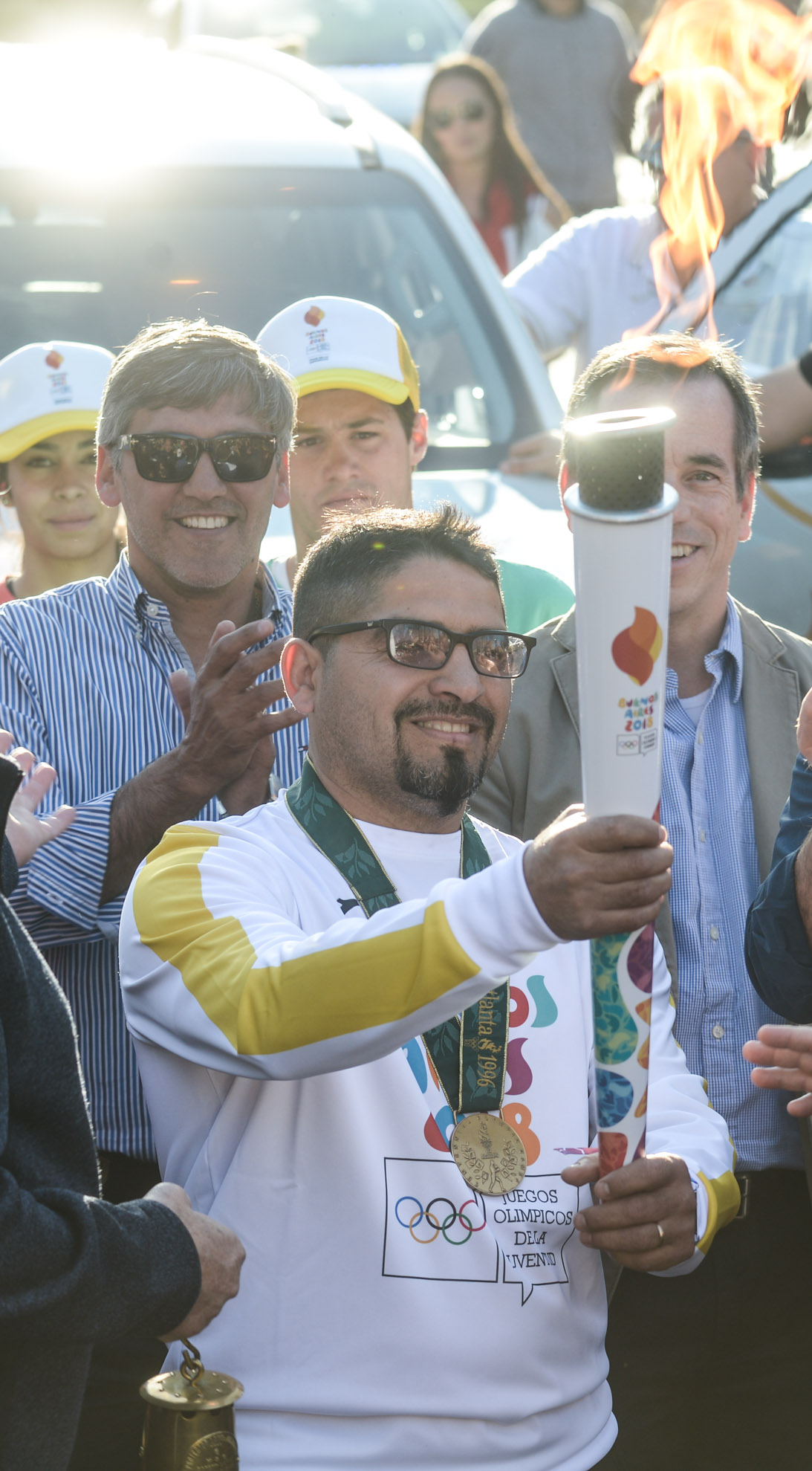
- Chacón during the torch relay of the 2018 Summer Youth Olympics

Personal information
- Nickname: El Relámpago
- Born: Julio Pablo Chacón; May 22, 1975 (age 51) Las Heras, Mendoza, Argentina
- Height: 5 ft 4 in (163 cm)
- Weight: Featherweight; Super featherweight

Boxing career
- Stance: Orthodox

Boxing record
- Total fights: 61
- Wins: 54
- Win by KO: 37
- Losses: 7
Medal record
Representing Argentina
Olympic Games
Men's boxing
Bronze medal – third place	1996 Atlanta	Featherweight

Julio Pablo Chacón (born May 22, 1975) is an Argentine boxer. Nicknamed "El Relámpago", Chacon won a Featherweight Bronze medal at the 1996 Summer Olympics. He was born in Las Heras, Mendoza.

== Amateur highlights ==
- 1994 competed as a Bantamweight at the World Cup in Bangkok, Thailand.
  - Lost to Steve Naraina (Mauritius) PTS
- 1996 won the Featherweight bronze medal at the Atlanta Olympics.
  - Defeated Tyson Gray (Jamaica) PTS (6-5)
  - Defeated Josian Lebon (Mauritius) PTS (14-7)
  - Defeated János Nagy (Hungary) PTS (18-4)
  - Lost to Somluck Kamsing (Thailand) PTS (8-20)

== Professional career ==
Chacon began his professional career in 1996 and went on to become WBO Featherweight champion. Chacon won his first 36 fights, setting up a fight with WBA Featherweight Title holder Freddie Norwood in 2000. Norwood dropped Chacon in the 3rd and won a unanimous decision. In 2001, Chacon would get a second shot at a world title. On this occasion Chacon defeated Istvan Kovacs by TKO to win the WBO Featherweight title. He defended his title twice, including a victory over Colombian contender Victor Polo. Chacon would eventually lose the title in 2002 to interim champ Scott Harrison via unanimous decision. He later moved up a weight class and challenged American cotender Mike Anchondo for the Vacant WBO Super Featherweight Title, Chacon lost via unanimous decision. In 2010 he won the Konex Award Merit Diploma as one of the five best boxers of the last decade in Argentina.

== Professional boxing record ==
61 fights	54 wins	7 losses
By knockout	37	1
By decision	15	6
By disqualification	2	0

No.	Result	Record	Opponent	Type	Round, time	Date	Location	Notes
61	Win	54–7	Julio Cesar Algañaraz	UD	12	2005–12–02	Estadio Luna Park, Buenos Aires, Argentina	Won vacant WBO Inter-Continental Super featherweight title.
60	Win	53–7	Julio Cesar Algañaraz	UD	12	2005–09–17	Polideportivo Municipal, Malargüe, Mendoza, Argentina	Ret. South American Super featherweight title.
59	Win	52–7	Roberto Arrieta	KO	2 (10) 2:58	2005–04–09	Estadio Pascual Perez, Mendoza, Argentina	
58	Loss	51–7	János Nagy	UD	12	2004–12–18	University Sporthall, Győr, Hungary	For vacant IBC Super featherweight title.
57	Win	51–6	Ricardo Chamorro	KO	9 (12)	2004–11–13	Estadio Posta del Retamo, Junín, Mendoza, Argentina	Ret. South American Super featherweight title.
56	Loss	50–6	Mike Anchondo	UD	12	2004–07–15	American Airlines Center, Dallas, Texas, U.S.	For vacant WBO Super featherweight title.
55	Win	50–5	Jairo Moura dos Santos	TKO	5 (10) 3:47	2004–05–29	Estadio Pascual Perez, Mendoza, Argentina	
54	Loss	49–5	Ricardo Silva	SD	10	2004–02–14	Club Atlético Mar del Plata, Mar del Plata, Buenos Aires, Argentina	
53	Win	49–4	Santos Rebolledo	KO	8 (10) 1:47	2003–12–06	Estadio Luna Park, Buenos Aires, Argentina	
52	Loss	48–4	János Nagy	TKO	10 (12)	2003–10–25	City Sporthall, Szolnok, Hungary	For WBO Inter-Continental Super featherweight title.
51	Win	48–3	Fernando Trejo	UD	10	2003–07–26	Club Newell's Old Boys, Rosario, Santa Fe, Argentina	
50	Win	47–3	Justo Martinez	KO	3 (10)	2003–06–21	Estadio General Mosconi, Cutral Có, Neuquén, Argentina	
49	Win	46–3	Esteban de Jesus Morales	UD	10	2003–05–03	Estadio F. A. B., Buenos Aires, Argentina	
48	Win	45–3	Claudio Martinet	TKO	8 (12)	2003–03–01	Polideportivo Municipal, Villa Carlos Paz, Córdoba, Argentina	Won South American Super featherweight title.
47	Loss	44–3	Scott Harrison	UD	12	2002–10–19	Braehead Arena, Glasgow, Scotland, U.K.	Lost WBO Featherweight title.
46	Win	44–2	Victor Hugo Paz	UD	10	2002–08–31	Estadio Pascual Perez, Mendoza, Argentina	
45	Win	43–2	Victor Polo	SD	12	2002–01–19	York Hall, London, England, U.K.	Ret. WBO Featherweight title.
44	Win	42–2	Andre Nicola	RTD	4 (10) 0:01	2001–11–17	Estadio F. A. B., Buenos Aires, Argentina	
43	Win	41–2	Edward Barrios	KO	5 (12) 2:50	2001–08–11	Estadio Malvinas Argentinas, Mendoza, Argentina	Ret. WBO Featherweight title.
42	Win	40–2	István Kovács	TKO	6 (12) 0:15	2001–06–16	Kisstadion, Budapest, Hungary	Won WBO Featherweight title.
41	Win	39–2	Claudio Martinet	KO	5 (12) 2:54	2001–02–24	Club Rivadavia, Necochea, Buenos Aires, Argentina	Won WBO Latino Super featherweight title.
40	Win	38–2	Sergio Liendo	RTD	4 (10) 0:01	2000–12–16	Estadio F. A. B., Buenos Aires, Argentina	
39	Win	37–2	Justo Martinez	UD	12	2000–10–28	Estadio Pascual Perez, Mendoza, Argentina	Won vacant WBO Latino Featherweight title.
38	Loss	36–2	Claudio Martinet	SD	10	2000–09–08	Casinos del Litoral, Corrientes, Argentina	
37	Loss	36–1	Freddie Norwood	UD	12	2000–05–25	Estadio Malvinas Argentinas, Mendoza, Argentina	For WBA Featherweight title.
36	Win	36–0	Wilson Palacio	TKO	8 (10) 1:20	1999–12–18	Club Andes Tallers, Godoy Cruz, Mendoza, Argentina	
35	Win	35–0	Richard Carrillo	TKO	8 (12) 1:19	1999–11–17	Hotel El Panamá, Panama City, Panamá	Ret. WBA Fedelatin Featherweight title.
34	Win	34–0	Aldo Valtierra	UD	10	1999–09–17	Talleres, San Luis, Argentina	
33	Win	33–0	Oscar León	TKO	10 (12)	1999–07–23	Estadio Pascual Perez, Mendoza, Argentina	Ret. WBA Fedelatin Featherweight title.
32	Win	32–0	Juan Cabrera	UD	10	1999–06–19	Club Nolting, Ciudadela, Buenos Aires, Argentina	
31	Win	31–0	Mauricio Julio	KO	4 (10)	1999–05–08	Club Argentino de Quilmes, Quilmes, Buenos Aires, Argentina	
30	Win	30–0	Hector Ordoñez	UD	10	1999–02–12	Mendoza, Argentina	
29	Win	29–0	Remigio Molina	DQ	8 (12)	1999–01–20	Club Atlético Quilmes, Mar del Plata, Buenos Aires, Argentina	Ret. WBA Fedelatin Featherweight title.
28	Win	28–0	Miguel Angel Albarado	KO	2	1998–12–18	San Juan, Argentina	
27	Win	27–0	Almir Fernandes de Oliveira	TKO	7 (10)	1998–11–07	Estadio Socios Fundadores, Comodoro Rivadavia, Chubut, Argentina	
26	Win	26–0	David Herrera	KO	1 (12) 1:43	1998–10–24	Estadio F. A. B., Buenos Aires, Argentina	Ret. WBA Fedelatin Featherweight title.
25	Win	25–0	Darryl Pinckney	UD	8	1998–09–19	Georgia Dome, Atlanta, Georgia, U.S.	
24	Win	24–0	Ever Beleno	DQ	3 (10)	1998–08–08	Estadio F. A. B., Buenos Aires, Argentina	
23	Win	23–0	Ruben Condori	TKO	4 (10)	1998–07–25	Canal 9 Studios, Buenos Aires, Argentina	
22	Win	22–0	Nestor Farias	KO	3 (10)	1998–06–27	Buenos Aires, Argentina	
21	Win	21–0	Oscar Bogarin	UD	10	1998–04–20	Corrientes, Argentina	
20	Win	20–0	Vicente Burgo	KO	4 (10)	1998–03–21	Estadio F. A. B., Buenos Aires, Argentina	
19	Win	19–0	Hector Mari	TKO	2 (10)	1998–03–12	Ciudad Mendoza, Mendoza, Argentina	
18	Win	18–0	Angel Rivas	KO	4 (12)	1998–01–16	Club Atlético Quilmes, Mar del Plata, Buenos Aires, Argentina	Won WBA Fedelatin Featherweight title.
17	Win	17–0	Hector Mari	UD	8	1997–10–18	Cipolletti, Argentina	
16	Win	16–0	Sergio Nuñez	KO	8 (12)	1997–08–08	Estadio Pascual Perez, Mendoza, Argentina	Ret. WBC Mundo Hispano Featherweight title.
15	Win	15–0	Walter Farias	UD	10	1997–07–11	Córdoba, Argentina	
14	Win	14–0	Hermogenes Mosquera	KO	4	1997–06–27	La Rioja, Argentina	
13	Win	13–0	Vicente Burgo	UD	10	1997–06–21	Canal 9 Studios, Buenos Aires, Argentina	
12	Win	12–0	Jaime Hernandez	KO	8 (12)	1997–05–17	La Banda, Argentina	Won WBC Mundo Hispano Featherweight title.
11	Win	11–0	Nestor Ayala	RTD	6 (8)	1997–05–10	Estadio Pascual Perez, Mendoza, Argentina	
10	Win	10–0	Horacio Basualdo	KO	4 (8)	1997–04–04	Estadio Polideportivo Nº 2, San Rafael, Mendoza, Argentina	
9	Win	9–0	Miguel Angel Rodríguez	KO	3	1997–03–26	Estadio Pascual Perez, Mendoza, Argentina	
8	Win	8–0	Jorge Carballo	KO	2	1997–03–22	Ituzaingó, Buenos Aires, Argentina	
7	Win	7–0	Oscar Bogarin	TKO	3 (6)	1997–02–15	Mar del Plata, Buenos Aires, Argentina	
6	Win	6–0	Andres Salto	TKO	1	1997–01–31	Mar del Plata, Buenos Aires, Argentina	
5	Win	5–0	Ricardo Romero	TKO	2 (8)	1997–01–10	Mar del Plata, Buenos Aires, Argentina	
4	Win	4–0	Juan Carlos Cortes	TKO	2	1996–11–16	Buenos Aires, Argentina	
3	Win	3–0	Nestor Redondo	TKO	8	1996–11–16	Estadio F. A. B., Buenos Aires, Argentina	
2	Win	2–0	Raul Ubalton	KO	1	1996–11–02	Canal 9 Studios, Buenos Aires, Argentina	
1	Win	1–0	Eduardo Diaz	TKO	4 (6)	1996–10–11	Estadio Pascual Perez, Mendoza, Argentina	

== See also ==
- List of world featherweight boxing champions

Sporting positions
Regional boxing titles
Preceded by Claudio Victor Martinet	South American super featherweight title March 1, 2003 – 2005; Vacated	Vacant Title next held by Roberto David Arrieta
World boxing titles
Preceded by István Kovács	WBO featherweight champion June 16, 2001 – October 19, 2002	Succeeded by Scott Harrison
