= Faustino Reyes =

Spanish boxer (born 1975)

Personal information
- Born: 27 April 1975 (age 51)
Medal record
Men's Boxing
Representing Spain
Olympic Games
Silver medal – second place	1992 Barcelona	Featherweight

Faustino Reyes López (born 27 April 1975) is a former boxer from Spain, who represented his native country at the 1992 Summer Olympics in Barcelona, Spain. There he won the silver medal in the featherweight division (– 57 kg), after being defeated in the final by Germany's Andreas Tews. He was born in Marchena, Seville and is of Romani descent.

== Olympic results ==
- Defeated Brian Carr (Great Britain) 22-10
- Defeated Somluck Kamsing (Thailand) 24-15
- Defeated Eddy Suarez (Cuba) 17-7
- Defeated Ramazan Palyani (Unified Team) 14-9
- Lost to Andreas Tews (Germany) 9-16
