= John Kelman =

Barbadian boxer (born 1968)

Personal information
- Nationality: Barbadian
- Born: 30 September 1968 (age 56)

Sport
- Sport: Boxing

John Kelman (born 30 September 1968) is a Barbadian boxer. He competed in the men's featherweight event at the 1996 Summer Olympics. After the referee stopped his opening bout against János Nagy of Hungary, Kelman angrily threw one of his gloves and was subsequently banned from amateur boxing for one year. Kelman also represented Barbados at the 1998 Commonwealth Games.
