= Maglioni =

Maglioni is a surname. Notable people with the surname include:

- Eduardo Maglioni (1946–2026), Argentine footballer
- Jorge Miguel Maglioni (born 1966), Argentine boxer
