= Serafim Todorov =

Bulgarian boxer

Serafim Todorov Серафим Тодоров
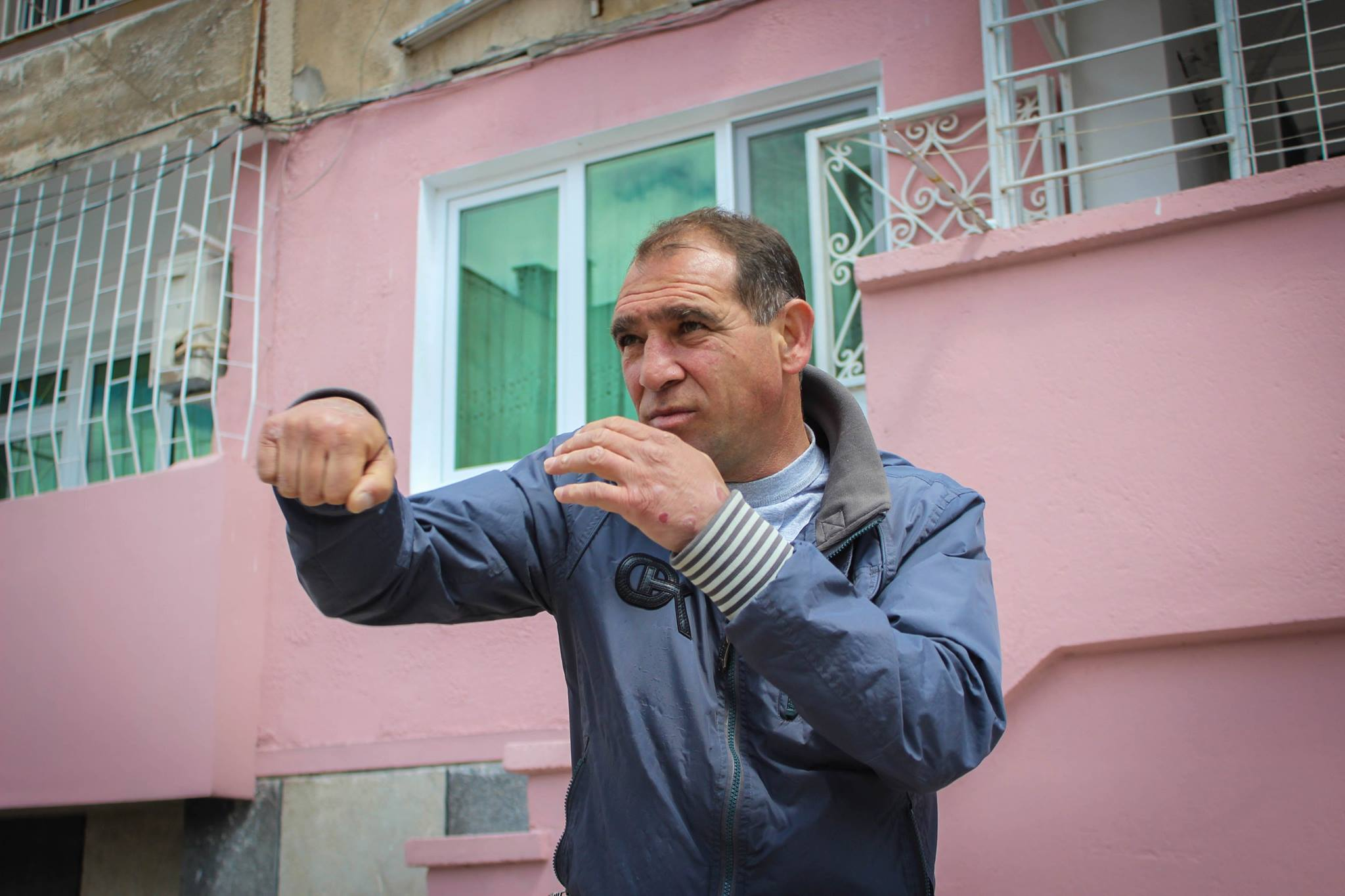
- Todorov in 2015

Personal information
- Full name: Serafim Simeonov Todorov
- Nickname: Sarafa ("The Money-changer")
- Nationality: Bulgarian
- Born: 6 July 1969 (age 57) Peshtera, Pazardzhik, Republic of Bulgaria
- Height: 1.78 m (5 ft 10 in)

Sport
- Sport: Boxing
- Weight class: Bantamweight; Featherweight
- Club: Slavia Club
Medal record
Representing Bulgaria
Olympic Games
Silver medal – second place	1996 Atlanta	Featherweight
World Championships
Gold medal – first place	1991 Sydney	Bantamweight
Gold medal – first place	1993 Tampere	Featherweight
Gold medal – first place	1995 Berlin	Featherweight
Silver medal – second place	1989 Moscow	Bantamweight
European Championships
Gold medal – first place	1989 Athens	Bantamweight
Gold medal – first place	1991 Gothenburg	Bantamweight
Gold medal – first place	1993 Bursa	Featherweight
Silver medal – second place	1996 Vejle	Featherweight

Serafim Simeonov Todorov (Bulgarian: Серафим Симеонов Тодоров; born 6 July 1969) is a former Bulgarian Olympic boxer. He won three consecutive gold medals at both the World and European Championships, and silver at the 1996 Olympics. He is the last boxer to defeat Floyd Mayweather Jr., via a controversial decision at the 1996 Games.

== Amateur career ==
As an amateur, Todorov won the world championships three times, in 1991 at bantamweight, and in 1993 and 1995 at featherweight. He won a silver medal at bantamweight in 1989, losing to Cuban Enrique Carrion in the final. He also won the European amateur championships in 1989 and 1991 at bantamweight, and in 1993 at featherweight.

Todorov represented Bulgaria at the 1988, 1992 and 1996 Olympic Games. In 1992, he lost in the quarter-finals to North Korean Li Gwang-Sik.

At the 1996 Summer Olympics, Todorov qualified to the semi-finals where he met the then 19-year-old American, Floyd Mayweather Jr. Todorov won by a 10–9 margin, although many observers felt that Mayweather won the fight. The referee initially raised Mayweather's hand at the end of the fight. Todorov went on to the final where he lost to Somluck Kamsing from Thailand and settled for the silver medal. The majority of people believe Emil Jetchev, the Bulgarian chairman of the international referees' and judges' commission, had orchestrated Todorov's victory. Jetchev was forced to retire following the fight due to the allegations and involvement of foul play. Todorov does not deny the possibility, but says that Jetchev also orchestrated his unfair loss to Kamsing in the final.

=== Olympic results ===
1992 (at bantamweight)

- Defeated John Sem (Papua New Guinea) 11–0
- Defeated Joseph Chongo (Zambia) 18–6
- Lost to Li Gwang-Sik (North Korea) 15–16

1996 (at featherweight)

- Defeated Yevheniy Shestakov (Ukraine) 11–4
- Defeated Robbie Peden (Australia) 20–8
- Defeated Falk Huste (Germany) 14–6
- Defeated Floyd Mayweather Jr. (United States) 10–9
- Lost to Somluck Kamsing (Thailand) 5–8

== Later life ==
Soon after his victory over Mayweather, Todorov rejected a lucrative offer from a group of American boxing promoters. He believed that if he had won the gold medal match in 1996, the Bulgarian Boxing Federation would provide more financially than the proposed contract would have. However, he received little support and decided to switch nationalities and represent Turkey at the 1997 World Amateur Boxing Championships. The Bulgarian Boxing Federation barred this move, and Todorov refused to represent his native country, ending his amateur boxing career by 2003. As of 2015, Todorov lives in Pazardzhik.

As of 2015, Serafim, a feature-length documentary film about Todorov's life has been in production. The film, directed by Robert Kolodny, is slated to be released in 2025. The nonfiction piece covers his early years, controversy at the Olympics and what his life has become since then.
