= Steven Chungu =

Zambian boxer (born 1969)

Personal information
- Nationality: Zambian
- Born: 22 July 1969 (age 55); Zambia
- Height: 163 cm (5 ft 4 in)
- Weight: 57 kg (126 lb)

Sport
- Country: Zambia
- Sport: Boxing

Steven Chungu (born 22 July 1969) is a Zambian Olympic boxer. He represented his country in the featherweight division at the 1992 Summer Olympics. He won his first bout against Paul Griffin, and then lost his second bout to Victoriano Damian.
