= Park Duk-kyu =

South Korean boxer (born 1972)

Medal record

Representing South Korea

Men's Boxing

World Amateur Championships
Silver medal – second place	Sydney 1991	Featherweight

Park Duk-Kyu (Korean: 박덕규; Hanja: 朴德奎; born October 29, 1972) is a former South Korean amateur boxer.

== Results ==
1991 World Championships

Event	Round	Result	Opponent	Score
Featherweight	First	bye		
Featherweight	Second	Win	(United States) Ivan Robinson	49-47
Featherweight	Quarterfinal	Win	(Canada) Michael Strange	22-17
Featherweight	Semifinal	Win	(Cuba) Arnaldo Mesa	16-15
Featherweight	Final	Loss	(Bulgaria) Kirkor Kirkorov	14-14+

1992 Summer Olympics

Event	Round	Result	Opponent	Score
Featherweight	First	bye		
Featherweight	Second	Win	(Mongolia) Sandagsuren Erdenebat	13-2
Featherweight	Quarterfinal	Loss	(Germany) Andreas Tews	7-17
