= Andreas Tews =

East German boxer

- Andreas Tews, Berlin, 1990

Personal information
- Born: 11 September 1968 (age 57) Rostock, Mecklenburg-Vorpommern, East Germany
Medal record
Men's Boxing
Olympic Games
Representing East Germany
Silver medal – second place	1988 Seoul	Flyweight
Representing Germany
Gold medal – first place	1992 Barcelona	Featherweight
European Amateur Championships
Representing East Germany
Gold medal – first place	1987 Turin	Flyweight
Representing Germany
Bronze medal – third place	1991 Gothenburg	Bantamweight

Andreas Tews (born 11 September 1968) is a German former amateur boxer. Tews won the Flyweight Silver medal at the 1988 Summer Olympics and the Featherweight Gold medal at the 1992 Summer Olympics.

His first international success came with his second place in the Flyweight class at the 1986 European Junior Championships held in Copenhagen. Just one year after that he won the European Senior Championship at Turin. In the 1991 European Championships at Gothenburg he came in third.

Tews never boxed professionally and is currently a trainer at Gymnasium Rahlstedt in Hamburg, Germany.

== Olympic results ==
- 1988 won the silver medal representing East Germany as a Flyweight at the Seoul Olympics:
  - Defeated Wang Weiping (China) PTS (5-0)
  - Defeated Janos Varadi (Hungary) PTS (5-0)
  - Defeated Benaissa Abed (Algeria) PTS (5-0)
  - Defeated Mario Gonzalez (Mexico) PTS (5-0)
  - Lost to Kim Kwang-Sun (South Korea) PTS (1-4)
- 1992 won the gold medal representing Germany as a Featherweight at the Barcelona Olympics:
  - Defeated Kirkor Kirkorov (Bulgaria) PTS (9-5)
  - Defeated Djamel Lifa (France) PTS (9-4)
  - Defeated Park Duk-Kyu (South Korea) PTS (17-7)
  - Defeated Hocine Soltani (Algeria) PTS (11-1)
  - Defeated Faustino Reyes (Spain) PTS (16-7)

== Other accomplishments ==
- East German Champion 1985/1987/1989 , German Champion 1991/1992
- 2nd place at Junior European Championships 1986
- European Champion at the 1987 European Amateur Boxing Championships
- Bronze medal at the 1991 European Amateur Boxing Championships
