= Heritovo Rakotomanga =

Malagasy boxer (born 1963)

Heritovo Jean Holland Rakotomanga
Personal information
- Nationality: Malagasy
- Born: 5 August 1963 (age 61); Madagascar
- Height: 175 cm (5 ft 9 in)
- Weight: 54 kg (119 lb)

Sport
- Country: Madagascar
- Sport: Boxing

Heritovo Rakotomanga is a Malagasy Olympic boxer. He represented his country in the featherweight division at the 1992 Summer Olympics. He won his first bout against Wasesa Sabuni, and then lost his second bout to Daniel Dumitrescu.
