= Eddy Sáenz =

Nicaraguan boxer

Personal information
- Nationality: Nicaraguan
- Born: 5 July 1970 (age 54)

Sport
- Sport: Boxing

Eddy Sáenz (born 5 July 1970) is a Nicaraguan former professional boxer who competed from 1993 to 2002. As an amateur, he competed in the men's featherweight event at the 1992 Summer Olympics. Sáenz also represented Nicaragua at the 1991 Pan American Games.
