= Serdar Yağlı =

Turkish boxer (born 1978)

Personal information
- Nationality: Turkish
- Born: 1 January 1978 (age 47)

Sport
- Sport: Boxing

Serdar Yağlı (born 1 January 1978) is a Turkish boxer. He competed in the men's featherweight event at the 1996 Summer Olympics.
