= Josian Lebon =

Mauritian boxer (born 1973)

Personal information
- Nationality: Mauritian
- Born: 6 August 1973 (age 51)

Sport
- Sport: Boxing

Josian Lebon (born 6 August 1973) is a Mauritian boxer. He competed in the men's featherweight event at the 1996 Summer Olympics.
