= Hiroki Ishii =

Japanese lightweight kickboxer (born 1979)

- Born: Ishii Hiroki; January 16, 1979 (age 47); Meguro, Tokyo, Japan
- Native name: 石井 宏樹
- Other names: Gon
- Nationality: (Japan) Japanese
- Height: 1.76 m (5 ft 9 in)
- Weight: 63.5 kg (140 lb; 10 st 0 lb)
- Division: Super Lightweight
- Style: Kickboxing
- Fighting out of: Meguro, Tokyo, Japan
- Team: Fujimoto Gym (1996–present)
- Trainer: Isao Fujimoto
- Years active: 1996–present (Kickboxing)

Kickboxing record
- Total: 78
- Wins: 55
- By knockout: 27
- Losses: 13
- Draws: 10

Other information
- Website: www.gonkickgonlife.com
- Last updated on: February 11, 2014

Hiroki Ishii (石井 宏樹, Ishii Hiroki; born January 16, 1979) is a Japanese lightweight kickboxer. He won the championship of Rajadamnern Stadium in Muay Thai at Super lightweight.

His entrance music is Spente Le Stelle.

== Biography ==
=== Wins Japanese national title ===
On January 23, 2000, he fought against Shingo Takayama's SNKA Japanese lightweight championship. He won by KO in 2nd round. Ishii defended this title 8 times until 2007.

=== Against Somluck Kamsing ===
On November 6, 2004, he fought against Somluck Kamsing from Thailand. The bout was resulted as draw (30-30, 30-30, 30-30) in the end of 3rd round.

=== Wins Rajadamnern Stadium title ===
On October 2, 2011, Ishii fought against Apisak K.T. Gym for the vacant title of Rajadamnern Stadium championship at super lightweight. He won by the unanimous decision and He became the 5th non-Thai champions of the two stadiums in Muay Thai.

He lost his title to Aikpet Mor. Krongthepthonburi at Magnum 31 in Tokyo on March 10, 2013 when he was knocked out with an elbow in the fourth by the Thai.

He lost to Kaew Fairtex by second round high kick KO for a WPMF super lightweight championship at Rikix: No Kick, No Life 2014 in Tokyo, Japan on February 11, 2014.

== Fight record ==
Professional Muaythai record
'55 Wins (27 KOs), 13 Losses, 10 Draws
Date	Result	Opponent	Event	Location	Method	Round	Time	Record
2014-02-11	Loss	(Thailand) Kaew Fairtex	Rikix: No Kick, No Life 2014	Tokyo, Japan	KO (left high kick)	2	0:44	
For vacant title of WPMF World Super lightweight (140lbs / 63.503kg).
2013-10-13	Win	(Thailand)	NJKF	Tokyo, Japan	KO (left high kick)	1	2:24	
2013-03-10	Loss	(Thailand) Aikpikart Mor.Krungthepthonburi	SNKA MAGNUM 31	Tokyo, Japan	KO (left elbow)	4	2:25	
Loses the Rajadamnern Stadium Super lightweight(63.5kg/140lbs) championship.
2012-09-15	Win	(Thailand) Plynoi Por. Paoin	SNKA "TITANS NEO 12"	Bunkyō, Tokyo, Japan	KO (Left Hook)	1	3:00	
Retains Rajadamnern Stadium Super lightweight(63.5kg/140lbs) championship.
2012-07-22	Win	(Thailand) Suadet Sor. Rattidet	SNKA "MAGNUM 29"	Bunkyō, Tokyo, Japan	Decision (Unanimous)	5	3:00	
2012-03-11	Win	(Thailand) Kenfang Por.Puangchon	SNKA "MAGNUM 28"	Bunkyō, Tokyo, Japan	Decision (Unanimous)	5	3:00	
Retains Rajadamnern Stadium Super lightweight(63.5kg/140lbs) championship.
2011-12-17	Win	(Thailand) Palhat Sakpanyar	SNKA "Soul in the Ring IX"	Bunkyō, Tokyo, Japan	KO (punch to the body)	5	1:25	54-11-10
2011-10-02	Win	(Thailand) Apisak K.T. Gym	SNKA "MAGNUM 27"	Bunkyō, Tokyo, Japan	Decision (Unanimous)	5	3:00	53-11-10
Wins vacant title of Rajadamnern Stadium Super lightweight(63.5kg/140lbs) championship.
2011-07-24	Win	(Thailand) Chinalorn Orsing	SNKA "MAGNUM 26"	Bunkyō, Tokyo, Japan	KO (Left body hook)	2	1:03	52-11-10
2011-05-15	Win	(Thailand) Jaksayarm Eksilikong Gym	SNKA "Brave Hearts 16"	Bunkyō, Tokyo, Japan	Decision (Unanimous)	5	3:00	51-11-10
2011-03-26	Win	(Thailand) Witeechai Sor Piromtong	SNKA "MAGNUM 25"	Bunkyō, Tokyo, Japan	KO (Left body shot)	2	2:53	50-11-10
2010-07-25	Loss	(Thailand) Parkao Klansaenmarharsarakam	SNKA "MAGNUM 23"	Bunkyō, Tokyo, Japan	KO (Left elbow strike)	2	2:48	49-11-10
2010-03-22	Loss	(Thailand) Yodkhunpon F.A.Group	Rajadamnern Stadium "Daorungchujaroen Fight"	Bangkok, Thailand	Decision (Unanimous)	5	3:00	49-10-10
The bout was for the vacant title of Rajadamnern Stadium & WMC World Super lightweight(63.5kg/140lbs) championships.
2009-12-13	Win	(Thailand) Seekun Lomsintong	SNKA "Soul In The Ring VII"	Bunkyō, Tokyo, Japan	KO (Body shots)	1	2:38	49-10-10
2009-10-25	Win	(Thailand) Denwatbot Sor.Veandet	SNKA "Magnum 21"	Bunkyō, Tokyo, Japan	TKO (Right elbow strike)	1	3:05	48-10-10
2009-07-12	Win	(Thailand) Kanongsuk Weerasakreck	SNKA "Magnum 20"	Bunkyō, Tokyo, Japan	KO (Right elbow strike)	3	0:41	47-10-10
2009-03-08	Win	(Thailand) Venailek Por.Lansang	SNKA "Magnum 19"	Bunkyō, Tokyo, Japan	Decision (Unanimous)	5	3:00	46-10-10
2008-12-23	Win	(Japan) Akihiro Kuroda	TOUITSU "King Of Kings Touitsu in Kobe", Final	Bunkyō, Tokyo, Japan	Decision (Unanimous)	3	3:00	45-10-10
Wins TOUITSU Lightweight (62kg) tournament.
2008-12-23	Win	(Japan) Tomohiro Oikawa	TOUITSU "King Of Kings Touitsu in Kobe", Semi-final	Bunkyō, Tokyo, Japan	Decision (Unanimous)	3	3:00	44-10-10
2008-12-23	Win	(Japan) Sohta	TOUITSU "King Of Kings Touitsu in Kobe", Quarter-final	Bunkyō, Tokyo, Japan	Decision (Majority)	3	3:00	43-10-10
2008-03-09	Loss	(Thailand) Singmanee Sor Srisompong	SNKA "Magnum 16"	Bunkyō, Tokyo, Japan	Decision (Unanimous)	5	3:00	42-10-10
The bout was for the vacant title of Rajadamnern Stadium & WMC World Super lightweight(63.5kg/140lbs) championships.
2008-01-20	Win	(Thailand) Chaidee Kar	SNKA "Brave Hearts 7"	Bunkyō, Tokyo, Japan	Decision (Unanimous)	3	3:00	42-9-10
2007-12-09	Win	(Thailand) Vitayanoi Sitkuonim	SNKA "Soul in The Ring V"	Bunkyō, Tokyo, Japan	KO (Right cross)	1	2:40	41-9-10
2007-09-16	Win	(Japan) Yukihiro Komiyama	SNKA "Titans Neos 2"	Bunkyō, Tokyo, Japan	Decision (Majority)	5	3:00	40-9-10
2007-07-22	Win	(South Korea) Yong Park	SNKA "Magnum 14"	Bunkyō, Tokyo, Japan	Decision (Unanimous)	5	3:00	39-9-10
Retains title of SNKA Japanese Lightweight (61.23kg/135lbs) championship. (8)
2007-04-22	Win	(Japan) Yukihiro Komiya	SNKA "Titans Neos"	Bunkyō, Tokyo, Japan	TKO (Doctor stoppage: Cut)	5	2:17	38-9-10
2007-03-11	Win	(Thailand) Tongchai Bunlat	SNKA "Magnum 13"	Bunkyō, Tokyo, Japan	KO	1	1:51	37-9-10
2007-01-21	Loss	(Thailand) Isorasak Sitheksen	SNKA "Brave Hearts 4"	Bunkyō, Tokyo, Japan	Decision (Unanimous)	3	3:00	36-9-10
2006-12-10	Win	(Japan) Yuki Ishihara	SNKA "Soul in The Ring IV"	Bunkyō, Tokyo, Japan	TKO (Doctor Stoppage: Cut)	4	0:17	36-8-10
Retains title of SNKA Japanese Lightweight (61.23kg/135lbs) championship. (7)
2006-10-22	Win	(Japan) Mitsuru Nakao	SNKA "Magnum 12"	Bunkyō, Tokyo, Japan	Decision (Unanimous)	3	3:00	35-8-10
2006-07-16	Draw	(Thailand) Denrangu Tor Saradeth	SNKA "Magnum 11"	Bunkyō, Tokyo, Japan	Decision (0-0)	3	3:00	34-8-10
2006-04-28	Win	(Japan) Makoto Nishiyama	SNKA "TITANS 3rd"	Bunkyō, Tokyo, Japan	TKO (Doctor stoppage: cut)	4	3:00	34-8-9
2006-03-26	Win	(Japan) Yuki Ishihara	SNKA "Magnum 10"	Bunkyō, Tokyo, Japan	Decision (Unanimous)	3	3:00	33-8-9
2006-01-29	Win	(Thailand) Ganswan Redmonn	SNKA "Brace Hearts 1"	Bunkyō, Tokyo, Japan	Decision (Majority)	3	3:00	32-8-9
2005-12-11	Win	(Thailand) Tunsongnoi Sinponlohar	SNKA "Soul In The Ring III"	Bunkyō, Tokyo, Japan	Decision (Unanimous)	3	3:00	31-8-9
2005-10-29	Win	(Thailand) Tonchai Bunglat	Riki Onodera's Retirement Event -No Kick、No Life~Final~	Bunkyō, Tokyo, Japan	KO (Right high kick)	1	1:23	30-8-9
2005-10-23	Win	(Thailand) Songmai Kaeosen	SNKA "Magnum 9"	Bunkyō, Tokyo, Japan	TKO (Towel thrown)	2	2:30	29-8-9
2005-08-22	Loss	(Thailand) Jaroenchai Jor Rachadakon	SNKA "Titans 2nd"	Bunkyō, Tokyo, Japan	Decision (Unanimous)	5	3:00	28-8-9
The bout was for Jaroenchai's title of Rajadamnern Stadium Lightweight(61.2kg/135lbs) championship.
2005-05-29	Draw	(Thailand) Dentarsai Kiatviwat	SNKA "Sledge Hammer"	Bunkyō, Tokyo, Japan	Decision (0-1)	3	3:00	28-7-9
2005-03-20	Win	(Japan) Masaru Itō	SNKA "Magnum 7"	Bunkyō, Tokyo, Japan	Decision (Unanimous)	5	3:00	28-7-8
Retains title of SNKA Japanese Lightweight (61.23kg/135lbs) championship. (6)
2005-01-16	Win	(Japan) Hyō Hoshino	SNKA "Onward Operation II"	Bunkyō, Tokyo, Japan	TKO (Doctor stoppage: Cut)	1	1:22	27-7-8
2004-12-12	Win	(Japan) Osamitsu Taka	SNKA "Soul In The Ring II"	Bunkyō, Tokyo, Japan	Decision (Unanimous)	3	3:00	26-7-8
2004-11-06	Draw	(Thailand) Somluck Kamsing	Titans 1st	Kitakyushu, Fukuoka, Japan	Scoreless	3	3:00	25-7-8
2004-07-11	Draw	(Thailand) Muangfahlek Kiatwichian	SNKA "Magnum 5"	Bunkyō, Tokyo, Japan	Decision (0-1)	3	3:00	25-7-7
2004-05-30	Draw	(Thailand) Atapon Por Samranchai	SNKA "Super-Hybrid"	Bunkyō, Tokyo, Japan	Decision (0-1)	3	3:00	25-7-6
2004-04-18	Draw	(South Korea) Ryu Park	SNKA "Super Kick"	Bunkyō, Tokyo, Japan	Decision (1-1)	5	3:00	25-7-5
Retains title of SNKA Japanese Lightweight (61.23kg/135lbs) championship. (5)
2004-03-21	Win	(Thailand) Parinya Jockey Gym	SNKA "Magnum 4"	Bunkyō, Tokyo, Japan	KO (Right low kick)	2	0:47	25-7-4
2003-11-24	Loss	(Thailand) Jormtap Kransaenmaharsarahkam	SNKA "Fight To Muay Thai"	Bangkok, Thailand	Decision	5	3:00	24-7-4
2003-10-12	Win	(Japan) Masaru Itō	SNKA "Magnum 3"	Bunkyō, Tokyo, Japan	Decision (Unanimous)	5	3:00	24-6-4
Retains title of SNKA Japanese Lightweight (61.23kg/135lbs) championship. (4)
2003-07-26	Draw	(Thailand) Noppakao Sorwanchart	SNKA "Magnum 2"	Bunkyō, Tokyo, Japan	Decision (1-1)	5	3:00	23-6-4
2003-05-18	Win	(Thailand) Jakawarnlek Saktewan	SNKA "Touch and Go"	Bunkyō, Tokyo, Japan	TKO	3	2:35	23-6-3
2003-03-23	Win	(Thailand) Gaendaller Swanaharnjabee	SNKA "Magnum 1"	Bunkyō, Tokyo, Japan	KO	3	2:27	22-6-3
2003-02-16	Win	(Japan) Jackall Kuroishi	SNKA "Fierce Battle"	Bunkyō, Tokyo, Japan	KO	2	2:07	21-6-3
2002-12-01	Win	(Thailand) Chunlong Sitkunglai	SNKA "Fight To Muay Thai 2002"	Bangkok, Thailand	KO	5	?	20-6-3
2002-10-20	Win	(Thailand) Kiatessarn Swanaharnjabee	SNKA "Road To Muay-Thai 2002"	Bunkyō, Tokyo, Japan	KO	4	0:45	19-6-3
2002-09-16	Win	(Australia) Adam Hourahan	SNKA "Riki Onodera Greatest Hits!"	Shibuya, Tokyo, Japan	KO	2	0:32	18-6-3
2002-07-27	Win	(Japan) Hiroki Iba	SNKA "Break Away"	Bunkyō, Tokyo, Japan	KO	1	2:43	17-6-3
Retains title of SNKA Japanese Lightweight (61.23kg/135lbs) championship. (3)
2002-05-26	Win	(South Korea) Byung-Gyu Park	SNKA "Lock On!"	Bunkyō, Tokyo, Japan	Decision (Unanimous)	5	3:00	16-6-3
2002-03-24	Win	(Thailand) Saryian Chuwattana	SNKA "Get Forward"	Bunkyō, Tokyo, Japan	Decision (Unanimous)	5	3:00	15-6-3
2002-01-27	Loss	(Thailand) Muangfahlek Kiatwichian	SNKA "Strike Back!"	Bunkyō, Tokyo, Japan	TKO (cut)	2	1:01	14-6-3
2001-12-09	Loss	(Thailand) Jakawarnleg Saktewan	Rajadamnner Stadium "Fight To Muay Thai 2001"	Bang Kok, Thailand	Decision (Unanimous)	5	3:00	14-5-3
2001-10-28	Win	(Thailand) Titimar Kiatprasangchai	SNKA "Road To Muay Thai 2001"	Bunkyō, Tokyo, Japan	Decision (Unanimous)	5	3:00	14-4-3
2001-09-16	Win	(Japan) Masaru Itō	SNKA "Take One"	Bunkyō, Tokyo, Japan	Decision (Majority)	5	3:00	13-4-3
Retains title of SNKA Japanese Lightweight (61.23kg/135lbs) championship. (2)
2001-05-27	Win	(Japan) Hiroki Iba	SNKA "The Start Fleet"	Bunkyō, Tokyo, Japan	Decision	5	3:00	12-4-3
2001-03-31	Loss	(Thailand) Sonkong Kianukung	SNKA	Bunkyō, Tokyo, Japan	Decision	5	3:00	11-4-3
2001-01-21	Win	(Japan) Takashi Nakagawa	SNKA	Bunkyō, Tokyo, Japan	Decision	5	3:00	11-3-3
Retains title of SNKA Japanese Lightweight (61.23kg/135lbs) championship. (1)
2000-12-03	Loss	(Thailand) Kaoklai Kaennorsing	SNKA "Fight To Muay Thai 2000"	Bangkok, Thailand	Decision	5	3:00	10-3-3
2000-10-28	Win	(Thailand) Seasawat Sakmuanfanguren	SNKA	Bunkyō, Tokyo, Japan	Decision	5	3:00	10-2-3
2000-09-10	Draw	(South Korea) Byung-Gyu Park	SNKA	Bunkyō, Tokyo, Japan	Decision	5	3:00	9-2-3
2000-05-05	Draw	(Thailand) Muangfahlek Kiatwichian	SNKA	Bunkyō, Tokyo, Japan	Decision	5	3:00	9-2-2
2000-04-09	Win	(Japan) Masakazu Shimizu	SNKA "Satelite"	Bunkyō, Tokyo, Japan	TKO	5	0:10	9-2-1
2000-01-23	Win	(Japan) Shingo Takayama	SNKA "Double Impact"	Bunkyō, Tokyo, Japan	KO	2	2:25	8-2-1
Wins Takayama's title of SNKA Japanese Lightweight (61.23kg/135lbs) championship.
1999-10-30	Win	(Japan) Takashi Nakagawa	SNKA "The Rematch Heaven or Hell"	Bunkyō, Tokyo, Japan	Decision (Unanimous)	5	3:00	7-2-1
1999-03-13	Win	(Japan) Shigeyuki Hanamura	SNKA	Bunkyō, Tokyo, Japan	Decision (Unanimous)	5	3:00	6-2-1
1998-03-28	Win	(Japan) Shingo Takayama	SNKA	Bunkyō, Tokyo, Japan	Decision			5-2-1
1998-01-31	Draw	(Japan) Katsumori Maita	SNKA	Bunkyō, Tokyo, Japan	Decision			4-2-1
1997-09-07	Win	(Japan) Shigeyuki Hanamura	SNKA	Bunkyō, Tokyo, Japan	Decision			4-2-0
1997-07-04	Win	(Japan) Michiyasu Kimura	SNKA	Bunkyō, Tokyo, Japan	Decision			3-2-0
1996-12-22	Win	(Japan) Shingo Koyanagi	SNKA	Bunkyō, Tokyo, Japan	Decision			2-2-0
1996-04-29	Loss	(Japan) Kakazu Nao	SNKA	Bunkyō, Tokyo, Japan	Decision			1-2-0
1996-03-31	Loss	(Japan) Eitetsu To	SNKA	Bunkyō, Tokyo, Japan	Decision			1-1-0
1996-01-28	Win	(Japan) Jun Fujita	SNKA	Bunkyō, Tokyo, Japan	KO	3	?	1-0-0
Legend: Win Loss Draw/No contest Notes

Amateur kickboxing record
Date	Result	Opponent	Event	Location	Method	Round	Time
2007-11-03	Loss	(Uzbekistan) Mavlonbek Kahhorov	2007 Asian Indoor Games, Muay, Welterweight, Final	Cotai, Macau	Decision (Split: 2-3)	4	2:00
2007-11-01	Win	(Jordan) Yaser Abu-Safiyah	2007 Asian Indoor Games, Muay, Welterweight, Semi-final	Cotai, Macau	Decision (Unanimous)	4	2:00
2007-10-30	Win	(Lebanon) Fadi Sweidan	2007 Asian Indoor Games, Muay, Welterweight, Quarter-final	Cotai, Macau	W.O.	1	0:00
Legend: Win Loss Draw/No contest Notes

== Titles ==
=== Amateur ===
- Kings Cup Tournament Runner-up (1997)
- 2007 Asian Indoor Games, Muay, Welterweight Runner-up (November 3, 2007)

=== Professional ===
- TOUITSU Lightweight champion (2008)
- Shin Nihon Kickboxing Association Lightweight champion
- Rajadamnern Stadium Super lightweight champion

== Awards ==
- 37th 2004 Japan Professional Sports Grand Prize, Fresh Award (January 24, 2005)

== See also ==
- Muay Thai
- Rajadamnern Stadium
