= Sin Su-yeong =

Korean male boxer

Personal information
- Nationality: South Korean
- Born: 17 April 1971 (age 53)

Sport
- Sport: Boxing

Sin Su-yeong (born 17 April 1971) is a South Korean boxer. He competed in the men's featherweight event at the 1996 Summer Olympics.
