= Luigi Castiglione =

Italian boxer

Medal record

Representing Italy

Men's Boxing

European Amateur Championships
| Silver medal – second place | 1991 Gothenburg | Light Flyweight |

Luigi "Gino" Castiglione (born 8 April 1967 in San Severo, Apulia) is a former professional boxer from Italy, who won the silver medal at the 1991 European Amateur Boxing Championships in Gothenburg, Sweden. In the final of the light flyweight (– 48 kg) he was defeated by Bulgaria's Ivailo Marinov. Castiglione competed at the 1992 Barcelona Olympics, but was eliminated in his first bout by South Korea's Dong-Bum Cho. He turned professional in 1993, and retired in 2002.

== 1992 Olympic results ==
- Round of 32: lost to Dong-Bum Cho (South Korea) on points, 2-8.
