= Nai Khanom Tom (TV series) =

1996 Thai television historical drama

Nai Khanom Tom (Thai: นายขนมต้ม, pronounced [naːj˧ kʰā.nǒm tôm]) is a 1996 Thai television drama in historical genre that originally aired on Channel 7 from October 16 to December 26, 1996, on Wednesdays and Thursdays at 20:30. The 22-episode drama series is an adaptation of the novel by S.E.A. Write Award-winning writer Komthuan Kanthanu.

The series is about the popular folklore character Nai Khanom Tom who is widely celebrated in Thailand and around the world and is referred as the "father of Muay Thai." The plot revolves around the Nai Khanom Tom folklore hero, a Muay Thai fighter living during the late Ayutthaya period, during the Burmese–Siamese War (1765–1767) resulting in victory by the Burmese and the fall of Ayutthaya. The legend says that "Nai Khanom Tom defeated 10 Burmese Lethwei fighters in a row, and was rewarded by the Burmese king Hsinbyushin." Scholars have critically examined the legend of Nai Khanom Tom, suggesting it is mythological rather than historical. Scholars suggest that the story of Nai Khanom Tom probably emerged in the 20th century, coinciding with efforts by Thai cultural institutions to construct a cohesive national identity. During the post-World War II era, figures like Luang Wichitwathakan played pivotal roles in promoting Thai nationalism, often through the creation and dissemination of cultural myths. The legend of Nai Khanom Tom serves as a case study in the invention of tradition, where folklore is utilized to foster national unity.

Starring Somluck Kamsing, Nai Khanom Tom was a success in terms of ratings. The eponymous theme song was composed and sung by Yuenyong Opakul of Carabao. It was also the first entertainment work of Thailand's first Olympic gold medalist Somluck Kamsing. Therefore, it had many famed boxers joining the show including Samart Payakaroon, Khaosai Galaxy, Vichairachanon Khadpo, Dhawee Umponmaha, Phajol Moolsan.
