= Ulugbek Ibragimov =

Uzbekistani boxer (born 1975)

Ulugbek Ibragimov (born 26 March 1975) is a boxer from Uzbekistan. He represented his native country at the 1996 Summer Olympics in Atlanta, where he was defeated by Germany's Falk Huste in the second round of the men's featherweight division (– 57 kg).
