= Yevheniy Shestakov =

Ukrainian boxer

Personal information
- Nationality: Ukraine
- Born: Євген Шестаков; 17 September 1976 (age 49) Ukraine
- Weight: Featherweight

Boxing career

Yevheniy Shestakov (Ukrainian: Євген Шестаков; born 17 September 1976) is a retired male boxer from Ukraine.

== Biography ==
He represented his native country at the 1996 Summer Olympics in Atlanta, where he was stopped in the first round of the men's featherweight division (– 57 kg) by Bulgaria's eventual silver medalist Serafim Todorov.

== See also ==
- Boxing at the 1996 Summer Olympics – Featherweight
