= Tyson Gray =

Jamaican boxer (born 1964)

Personal information
- Nationality: Jamaican
- Born: 14 April 1964 (age 60)

Sport
- Sport: Boxing

Tyson Gray (born 14 April 1964) is a Jamaican boxer. He competed in the men's featherweight event at the 1996 Summer Olympics.
