= Rogério Dezorzi =

Brazilian boxer (born 1966)

Personal information
- Born: 12 August 1966 (age 59) São Paulo, Brazil

Sport
- Sport: Boxing
Medal record
Representing Brazil
Pan American Games
Bronze medal – third place	1991 Havana	Featherweight

Rogério de Brito Dezorzi (born 12 August 1966) is a Brazilian boxer. He competed at the 1992 Summer Olympics and the 1996 Summer Olympics. In the tournament, he defeated Steven Kevi of Papua New Guinea in the first round, before being beaten by Ramazan Palyani of the Unified Team in the next round.
