= Narendar Bisth Singh =

Indian boxer

Personal information
- Nationality: Indian
- Born: 1 April 1964 (age 60); India

Sport
- Country: India
- Sport: Boxing

Narendar Bisth Singh is an Indian Olympic boxer. He represented his country in the featherweight division at the 1992 Summer Olympics. He lost his first bout against Carlos Gerena.
