= Davis Lusimbo =

Ugandan boxer

Personal information
- Nationality: Ugandan
- Born: July 23, 1966 (age 59) Uganda
- Weight: Light welterweight

Boxing career

Boxing record
- Total fights: 12
- Wins: 9
- Win by KO: 3
- Losses: 1
- Draws: 2

Davis Lusimbo (born 23 July 1966) is a Ugandan former professional boxer who competed from 1997 to 2003, once winning the ABU light welterweight title. As an amateur he represented his country in the featherweight division at the 1992 Summer Olympics. He lost his first bout against Mohamed Soltani.

== Professional boxing record ==
11 fights	9 wins	1 loss
By knockout	3	1
By decision	6	0
Draws	1	

No.	Result	Record	Opponent	Type	Round, time	Date	Location	Notes
12	Loss	9–1–2	(Benin) Victor Kpadenou	PTS	10	12 Apr 2003	Globe Cinema, Accra, Ghana	For African light welterweight title
11	Win	9–0–2	(Kenya) George Owenge	KO	6 (?)	22 Dec 2002	Sabrina's Pub, Kampala, Uganda	
10	Win	8–0–2	(Kenya) Charles Owiso	PTS	10	29 Oct 2002	Sabrina's Pub, Kampala, Uganda	
9	Win	7–0–2	(Kenya) George Owano	SD	12	7 Jul 2002	Nakivubo Stadium, Kampala, Uganda	Won vacant African light-welterweight title
8	Win	6–0–2	(Zambia) Bruno Sakabunda	PTS	6	16 Sep 2000	Grand Regency Hotel, Nairobi, Kenya	
7	Draw	5–0–2	(Kenya) Joseph Miyumo	TD	3 (?)	30 July 2000	Nairobi, Kenya	
6	Draw	5–0–1	(Kenya) Charles Owiso	PTS	8	12 Feb 2000	Florida Day and Night Club, Mombasa, Kenya	
5	Win	5–0	(Tanzania) Pascal Kimaru Bruno	KO	3 (?)	26 Sep 1999	Nairobi, Kenya	
4	Win	4–0	(Uganda) Steven Kavuma	KO	1 (?)	11 Jul 1999	Kampala, Uganda	
3	Win	3–0	(Uganda) Godfrey Kabaya	PTS	6	2 May 1999	Kampala, Uganda	
2	Win	2–0	(Uganda) Meddie Kiberu	PTS	6	21 Mar 1999	Kampala, Uganda	
1	Win	1–0	(United States) Paul Mpendo	PTS	6	25 Dec 1997	Nakivubo Stadium, Kampala, Uganda	
