= Luís Seda =

Puerto Rican boxer

Personal information
- Nationality: Puerto Rican
- Born: 5 June 1976 (age 48)

Sport
- Sport: Boxing

Luís Seda (born 5 June 1976) is a Puerto Rican boxer. He competed in the men's featherweight event at the 1996 Summer Olympics.
