= Brian Carr =

Scottish boxer

Personal information
- Nationality: Scottish
- Born: 20 June 1969 (age 57) Glasgow, Scotland
- Height: 5 ft 5 1/2 in (1.66 m)
- Weight: super bantam/feather/super featherweight

Boxing career
- Stance: Southpaw

Boxing record
- Total fights: 33
- Wins: 25 (KO 5)
- Losses: 7 (KO 3)
- Draws: 1

Brian Carr (born 20 June 1969, in Glasgow) is a Scottish amateur featherweight and professional super bantam/feather/super featherweight boxer of the 1990s and 2000s.

== Boxing career ==
=== Amateur career ===
As an amateur he won the 1990 Amateur Boxing Association of England (ABAE) featherweight title, when boxing out of the Auchengeich BC, against John Williams (Pontypool & Panteg BC).

He represented Great Britain at featherweight in the Boxing at the 1992 Summer Olympics in Barcelona, Spain, losing to eventual silver medal winner Faustino Reyes of Spain.

=== Professional career ===
As a professional he won the British Boxing Board of Control (BBBofC) Scottish Area featherweight title, and Commonwealth super bantamweight title (won against Meshack Kondwani), and was a challenger for the British super bantamweight title against; Michael Brodie, Patrick Mullings, Michael Alldis, and Esham Pickering, and World Boxing Union (WBU) featherweight title against Cassius Baloyi.

His professional fighting weight varied from 120 lb (54 kg; 8 st 8 lb), (super bantamweight) to 130 lb (59.0 kg; 9 st 4.0 lb), (super featherweight).
