= Jorge Miguel Maglioni =

Argentine boxer

Personal information
- Born: 28 December 1966 (age 58); Maquinchao, Argentina

Sport
- Sport: Boxing

Jorge Miguel Maglioni (born 28 December 1966) is an Argentine boxer. He competed in the men's featherweight event at the 1992 Summer Olympics.
