= Roberto Welin =

Roberto Welin is a former Swedish boxer, born on April 9, 1966, in São Paulo, Brazil. During his amateur career, Welin represented clubs in Västerås such as BK Rapid, Stockholm's IF Linnéa, and Malmö's GAK Enighet.

== Biography ==
=== Background ===
Roberto Welin was born in São Paulo, Brazil. He grew up in Carazinho in the southern part of the country (the state of Rio Grande do Sul), where his Swedish-born father, Gunnar Welin, managed a large agricultural business. As a teenager, Roberto Welin moved to Sweden.

=== 1980s ===
Welin made his Swedish Championship debut in 1987 but was defeated by Lars Myrberg in the second round. His international debut, however, occurred a year earlier when Welin lost to Yugoslavia's Djorde Petronievic by technical knockout in Malmö (Yugoslavia won the match 8–3). His first major championship came in 1989 when he won the South Swedish Championship. That same year, Welin also became the Swedish champion after knocking out Säffle boxer Conny Olausson in the final on February 27 in Stockholm. Welin made his European Championship debut in May and won his first match against a Polish boxer but was then knocked out by Mujo Bajrovic from Yugoslavia. His World Championship debut occurred in September in Moscow, Soviet Union. While in the then-turbulent Moscow, Welin defeated a boxer from Japan and a Ghanaian but lost a close quarter-final match to American Raul Marquez.

=== European Champion ===
The year 1991 started well as Welin repeated his Swedish Championship victory by knocking out a Småland boxer in the final on February 25. There were not many medal expectations for Welin heading into the home European Championships in Gothenburg. Nevertheless, Welin started the championship brilliantly on May 8, when he knocked out an English boxer and then decisively defeated a Turkish boxer (23–10) the next day. In the semi-final, Welin faced his rival from the European Championships two years earlier, Yugoslavian Bajrovic. This time, however, Bajrovic was no match, and Welin's victory margin was 18–11. In the final on May 12, the heavily favored Soviet boxer Vladimir Yereshchenko awaited. Nothing could stop the home boxer, as Welin overwhelmed Yereshchenko with punches and won by clear judge scores (24–15). This European Championship title was Sweden's first in 40 years! The previous one had been won by Stig Sjölin in 1951 in Milan.

However, there was a near miss with the European Championship adventure. National coach Leif Carlsson assessed Walle Haddad as being equal to Welin. Therefore, a selection match was to be held to determine who would represent Sweden in the Gothenburg championship. Haddad complained about a hand injury and refused to compete in the selection match. Carlsson then selected Welin for the championship, and in hindsight, even Haddad could hardly question that decision.

Soon after the European triumph, Welin announced he would leave amateur boxing to seek success as a professional boxer. His last amateur match was on January 27, 1992, in a team match against United States in Stockholm. Welin won his match by technical knockout, but the team match ended in a draw.

=== Professional career ===
Welin made his professional debut on June 13, 1992, when he knocked out American Darrell Walker in Miami. Welin won four more matches against modest opposition in the United States before suffering his first defeat by technical knockout against Ugandan Richard Okumu in London. After the loss, Welin recorded eight victories in 1993 and six victories in 1994 before he was defeated by British Chris Saunders on December 17 in Sardinia. During 1995, Welin fought five matches (four wins and one loss); among other victories, he knocked out Pori boxer Joni Nyman in Helsinki. On May 8, 1996, Welin finally got his title match for the WBU world championship belt. American Emmett Linton knocked out the Swede in just two minutes and 45 seconds. After the match, Welin announced his retirement.

Overall, Roberto Welin won 23 of his 27 professional matches.

=== Personal life ===
Welin trained as an aircraft mechanic before starting his professional career. After his boxing career, he took up employment in this field in the United States. The latest records of Welin indicate that he lives with his wife and children in Florida where he runs his own business.

Welin's son Kevin has followed in his father's footsteps and trained in boxing with GAK Enighet in Malmö.
