= Sandagsürengiin Erdenebat =

Mongolian boxer (born 1971)

Personal information
- Nationality: Mongolian
- Born: 5 October 1971 (age 53)

Sport
- Sport: Boxing

Sandagsürengiin Erdenebat (born 5 October 1971) is a Mongolian boxer. He competed in the men's featherweight event at the 1992 Summer Olympics.
