= Wasesa Sabuni =

Swedish boxer (born 1971)

Personal information
- Nationality: Swedish
- Born: 3 May 1971 (age 54); Bujumbura, Burundi

Sport
- Sport: Boxing

Wasesa Sabuni (born 3 May 1971) is a Swedish boxer. He competed in the men's featherweight event at the 1992 Summer Olympics.
