= Mohamed Soltani =

Tunisian boxer

Personal information
- Nationality: Tunisian
- Born: 7 February 1967 (age 58); Tunisia

Sport
- Country: Tunisia
- Sport: Boxing

Mohamed Soltani is a Tunisian Olympic boxer. He represented his country in the featherweight division at the 1992 Summer Olympics. He won his first bout against Davis Lusimbo, and then lost his second bout to Eddy Suarez.
