= Victoriano Sosa =

Dominican Republic boxer (born 1974)

Victoriano Damián Sosa (born April 17, 1974 in Santiago, Dominican Republic) is a former boxer.

== Personal ==
Sosa is second cousin of Major League Baseball player Sammy Sosa.

== Amateur career ==
Member of the 1992 Dominican Olympic Team as a Featherweight. His results were:

- Defeated by Anand Kumar Ray (India) 23-14
- Defeated Steven Chungu (Zambia) 11-9
- Lost to Hocine Soltani (Algeria) 13-4

== Pro career ==
His career boxing record is 42-4-2- (31 KOs). Earlier in his career, Sosa won minor titles—the WBC Fecarbox and Dominican Republic lightweight titles. He has been a contender in the lightweight division, challenging world champions such as Floyd Mayweather Jr. and Miguel Cotto (going the distance and getting KOed respectively), as well as Paul Spadafora.

== Professional boxing record ==
| 48 fights | 42 wins | 4 losses |
|---|---|---|
| By knockout | 31 | 2 |
| By decision | 11 | 2 |
| Draws | 2 | |

| No. | Result | Record | Opponent | Type | Round, time | Date | Location | Notes |
|---|---|---|---|---|---|---|---|---|
| 48 | Win | 42–4–2 | (Costa Rica) Francisco Campos | TKO | 10 (10) | 9 December 2005 | (United States) Paradise Theater, Bronx, New York | |
| 47 | Win | 41–4–2 | (Dominican Republic) Leonardo Espinal | KO | 2 (8) | 18 June 2005 | Santiago de los Caballeros, Dominican Republic | |
| 46 | Win | 40–4–2 | (Venezuela) Darwin Padron | KO | 3 (10) | 11 April 2005 | (United States) Santiago de los Caballeros, Dominican Republic | |
| 45 | Win | 39–4–2 | (Dominican Republic) Marcos Hernandez | TKO | 1 (12) | 18 October 2004 | (United States) Santiago de los Caballeros, Dominican Republic | Won Dominican Republic Lightweight title |
| 44 | Win | 38–4–2 | (United States) Marteze Logan | UD | 10 | 11 June 2004 | (United States) Turning Stone Resort Casino, Veron, Wisconsin, US | |
| 43 | Loss | 37–4–2 | (Puerto Rico) Miguel Cotto | TKO | 4 (12) | 28 February 2004 | (United States) MGM Grand, Las Vegas, Nevada, US | For WBC International Super Lightweight title |
| 42 | Win | 37–3–2 | (Dominican Republic) Danilo Alcantara | TKO | 4 (10) | 5 January 2004 | Santiago de los Caballeros, Dominican Republic | |
| 41 | Win | 36–3–2 | (Mexico) Miguel Angel Huerta | UD | 10 | 10 October 2003 | (United States) McBride Hall, Gary, Indiana, US | |
| 40 | Loss | 35–3–2 | (United States) Floyd Mayweather Jr. | UD | 12 | 19 April 2003 | (United States) Selland Arena, Fresno, California, US | For WBC Lightweight title |
| 39 | Win | 35–2–2 | (Dominican Republic) Luis Sosa | TKO | 6 (10) | 21 February 2003 | Coliseo Carlos ‘Teo’ Cruz, Santo Domingo, Dominican Republic | |
| 38 | Draw | 34–2–2 | (United States) Lamar Murphy | SD | 12 | 9 November 2002 | (Dominican Republic) Mountaineer Casino Racetrack and Resort, Chester Pennsylvania, US | |
| 37 | Win | 34–2–1 | (Dominican Republic) Luis Sosa | KO | 1 (12) | 2 March 2002 | La Romana, Dominican Republic | Won Dominican Republic Lightweight title |
| 36 | Win | 33–2–1 | (Puerto Rico) Victor Valentin | TKO | 3 (8) | 18 October 2001 | Santo Domingo, Dominican Republic | |
| 35 | Win | 32–2–1 | (Mexico) Enrique Ramirez | TKO | 2 (8) | 1 September 2001 | Santo Domingo, Dominican Republic | |
| 34 | Win | 31–2–1 | (Dominican Republic) Armando Juan Reyes | KO | 3 (8) | 30 June 2001 | Santiago de los Caballeros, Dominican Republic | |
| 33 | Win | 30–2–1 | (Dominican Republic) Francisco Lorenzo | PTS | 10 | 20 April 2001 | Santo Domingo, Dominican Republic | |
| 32 | Win | 29–2–1 | (Dominican Republic) Jose Garcia | PTS | 10 | 29 December 2000 | Santo Domingo, Dominican Republic | |
| 31 | Win | 28–2–1 | (United States) Harold Warren | UD | 10 | 3 November 2000 | (United States) Turning Stone Resort Casino, Verona, Wisconsin, US | |
| 30 | Win | 27–2–1 | (Dominican Republic) Freddy Cruz | PTS | 10 | 8 October 2000 | Santiago de los Caballeros, Dominican Republic | |
| 29 | Win | 26–2–1 | (Dominican Republic) Gabino Del Orbe | KO | 1 (8) | 26 June 2000 | La Romana, Dominican Republic | |
| 28 | Win | 25–2–1 | (Dominican Republic) Rafael De la Cruz | TKO | 3 (8) | 29 April 2000 | Santiago de los Caballeros, Dominican Republic | |
| 27 | Loss | 24–2–1 | (United States) Paul Spadafora | UD | 12 | 3 March 2000 | (United States) Turning Stone Resort Casino, Verona, Wisconsin, US | For IBF Lightweight title |
| 26 | Win | 24–1–1 | (Dominican Republic) Rafael Valerio | TKO | 10 | 1 February 2000 | Santo Domingo, Dominican Republic | |
| 25 | Win | 23–1–1 | (Dominican Republic) Ambioris Figuero | PTS | 12 | 25 October 1999 | Santo Domingo, Dominican Republic | |
| 24 | Win | 22–1–1 | (Dominican Republic) Geovany Fernandez | TKO | 2 (10) | 9 October 1999 | La Vega, Dominican Republic | |
| 23 | Win | 21–1–1 | (Dominican Republic) Johnny Diaz Lebron | KO | 1 (10) | 19 July 1999 | Santo Domingo, Dominican Republic | |
| 22 | Win | 20–1–1 | (Dominican Republic) Sigfredo Cabera | KO | 1 (10) | 31 May 1999 | Santo Domingo, Dominican Republic | |
| 21 | Win | 19–1–1 | (Dominican Republic) Rafael Meran | PTS | 12 | 27 March 1999 | Santo Domingo, Dominican Republic | Retained WBC FECARBOX Lightweight title |
| 20 | Win | 18–1–1 | (Dominican Republic) Sigfredo Cabera | KO | 2 (10) | 16 February 1999 | Santo Domingo, Dominican Republic | |
| 19 | Win | 17–1–1 | (Dominican Republic) Freddy Cruz | PTS | 12 | 15 December 1998 | Santo Domingo, Dominican Republic | Retained WBC FECARBOX Lightweight title |
| 18 | Win | 16–1–1 | (Dominican Republic) Francisco Alvarez | KO | 4 (12) | 4 November 1998 | Santo Domingo, Dominican Republic | Retained WBC FECARBOX Lightweight title |
| 17 | Win | 15–1–1 | (Dominican Republic) Danilo Alcantra | TKO | 8 (10) | 21 October 1998 | Santiago de los Caballeros, Dominican Republic | |
| 16 | Win | 14–1–1 | (Dominican Republic) Edward Mota | TKO | 2 (12) | 29 June 1998 | Santo Domingo, Dominican Republic | Retained WBC FECARBOX Lightweight title |
| 15 | Win | 13–1–1 | (Dominican Republic) Pascual Polanco | PTS | 12 | 30 April 1998 | Santo Domingo, Dominican Republic | |
| 14 | Win | 12–1–1 | (Panama) Hilario Guzman | KO | 2 (10) | 26 February 1998 | Santo Domingo, Dominican Republic | Won World Boxing Council Lightweight title |
| 13 | Win | 11–1–1 | (Dominican Republic) Ramon Emilio | TKO | 5 (6) | 15 December 1997 | Santo Domingo, Dominican Republic | |
| 12 | Win | 10–1–1 | (Dominican Republic) Armando Juan Reyes | TKO | 8 (12) | 31 July 1997 | Santo Domingo, Dominican Republic | Won Dominican Republic Lightweight title |
| 11 | Win | 9–1–1 | (Dominican Republic) Prudencio De Jesus | TKO | 4 (6) | 28 May 1997 | Santo Domingo,[Dominican Republic | |
| 10 | Win | 8–1–1 | (Dominican Republic) Felix Perez | TKO | 2 (6) | 9 May 1997 | Santo Domingo, Dominican Republic | |
| 9 | Win | 7–1–1 | (Dominican Republic) Ramon Alix | TKO | 2 (6) | 1 February 1997 | Santo Domingo, Dominican Republic | For Dominican Republic Super Featherweight title |
| 8 | Win | 6–1–1 | (Dominican Republic) Alexis Urena | TKO | 3 (6) | 25 November 1996 | Santiago de los Caballeros, Dominican Republic | For Dominican Republic Super Featherweight title |
| 7 | Loss | 5–1–1 | (Dominican Republic) Antonio Ramriez | KO | 2 (12) | 23 September 1996 | Santo Domingo, Dominican Republic | For Dominican Republic Super Featherweight title |
| 6 | Win | 5–0–1 | (Dominican Republic) Santiago Matos | KO | 1 (8) | 11 August 1996 | Santo Domingo, Dominican Republic | |
| 5 | Draw | 4–0–1 | (Dominican Republic) Antonio Ramriez | PTS | 12 | 25 March 1996 | Santo Domingo, Dominican Republic | For Dominican Republic Super Featherweight title |
| 4 | Win | 4–0 | (Dominican Republic) Jose Nino Diaz | TKO | 3 (8) | 5 August 1995 | Santo Domingo, Dominican Republic | |
| 3 | Win | 3–0 | (Colombia) Jose Valdez | KO | 1 (4) | 14 June 1995 | La Vega, Dominican Republic | |
| 2 | Win | 2–0 | (Dominican Republic) Angel Santana | PTS | 4 | 3 April 1995 | Santiago de los Caballeros, Dominican Republic | |
| 1 | Win | 1–0 | (Dominican Republic) Alexis Urena | TKO | 3 (4) | 30 January, 1995 | La Vega, Dominican Republic | |
