= Ri Chil-gun =

North Korean boxer

Personal information
- Nationality: North Korean
- Born: 5 September 1970 (age 54); North Korea
- Height: 170 cm (5 ft 7 in)
- Weight: 57 kg (126 lb)

Sport
- Country: North Korea
- Sport: Boxing

Ri Chil-gun (born 5 September 1970) is a North Korean Olympic boxer. He represented his country in the featherweight division at the 1992 Summer Olympics. He lost his first bout against Eddy Suarez.
