= Eddy Suarez =

Cuban boxer

Eddy Suarez Edua
Personal information
- Born: 28 January 1969 (age 56); Cuba
- Height: 173 cm (5 ft 8 in)
- Weight: 57 kg (126 lb)

Sport
- Country: Cuba
- Sport: Boxing

Eddy Suarez is a Cuban Olympic boxer. He represented his country in the featherweight division at the 1992 Summer Olympics. He won his first bout against Lee Chil-Gun, then lost won in his second bout against Mohamed Soltani, but lost in his third bout against Faustino Reyes.
