= János Nagy (boxer) =

Hungarian boxer

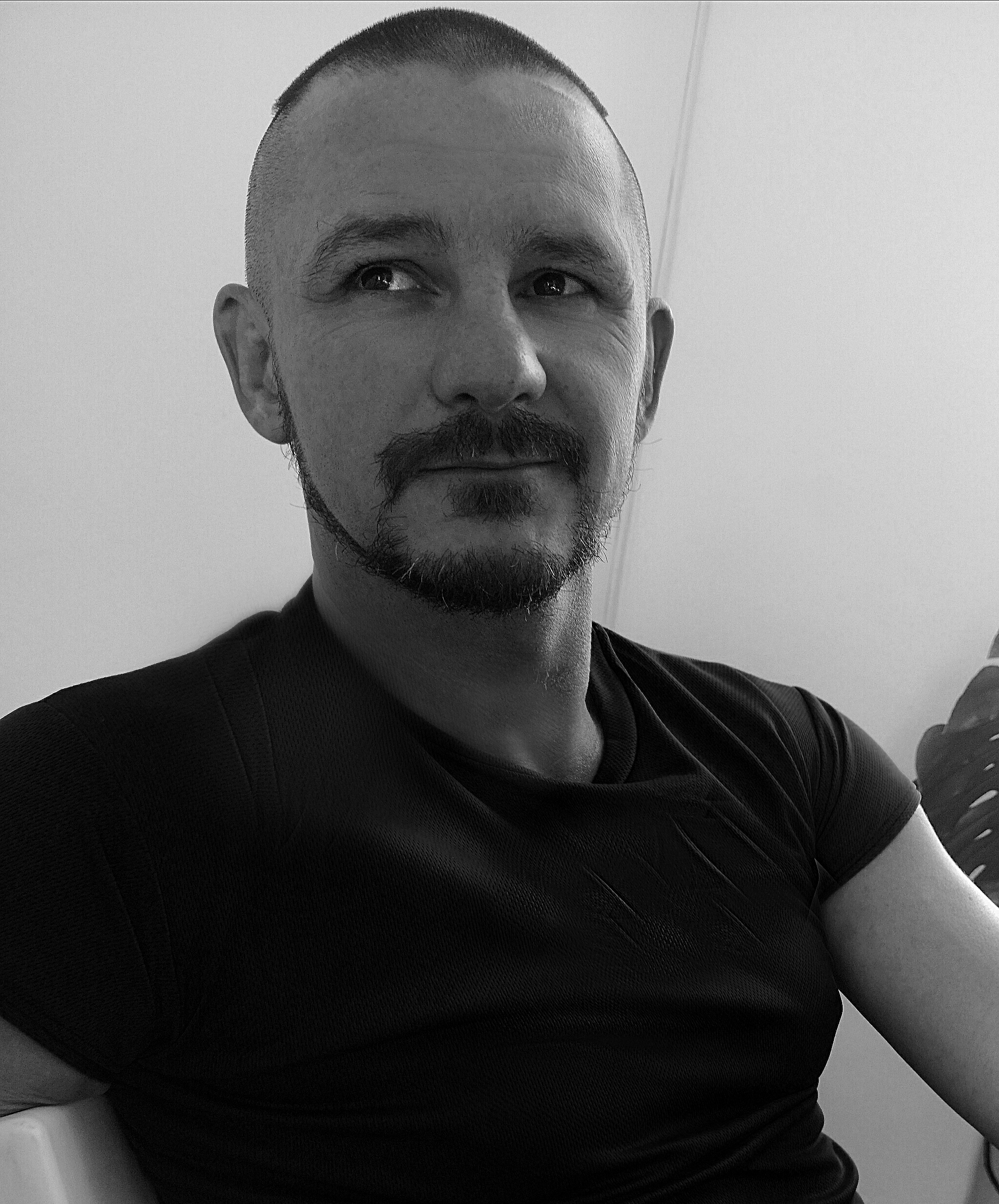
- Nagy in 2019

Personal information
- Nationality: Hungarian
- Born: 27 January 1975 (age 50); Győr, Hungary

Sport
- Sport: Boxing

János Nagy (born 27 January 1975) is a Hungarian boxer. He competed in the men's featherweight event at the 1996 Summer Olympics.
