= Charlie Baleña =

Filipino boxer

Personal information
- Nationality: Filipino
- Born: June 1, 1972 (age 53)
- Height: 5 ft 6 in (168 cm)
- Weight: 126 lb (57 kg)

Sport
- Sport: Boxing

Charlie Baleña (born June 1, 1972) is a Filipino boxer. He competed in the men's featherweight event at the 1992 Summer Olympics.

Career History

Year	Tournament	Country	Achievement
1990	ASEAN Games	Beijing, China	Quarter Finalist
1990	President's Cup	Indonesia	Silver Medalist
1992	Olympics Qualifying	Philippines	Gold Medalist
1992	Summer Olympics	Barcelona	
1992	Acropolis Cup	Greece, Athens	Silver Medalist
1993	SEA Games	Singapore	Silver Medalist
