= Paul Griffin (boxer) =

Irish boxer

Personal information
- Nationality: Irish
- Born: 3 June 1971 (age 53)

Sport
- Sport: Boxing

Paul Griffin (born 3 June 1971) is an Irish boxer. He competed in the men's featherweight event at the 1992 Summer Olympics.
