= Falk Huste =

German boxer

Personal information
- Born: 6 November 1971 (age 54)
Medal record
Men's Boxing
Representing Germany
World Amateur Championships
Silver medal – second place	1997 Budapest	Featherweight
Bronze medal – third place	1995 Berlin	Featherweight
European Amateur Championships
Bronze medal – third place	2000 Tampere	Featherweight

Falk Huste (born 6 November 1971 in Greiz, Thüringen) is a boxer from Germany, who won the bronze medal in the Men's Featherweight (– 57 kg) division at the 2000 European Amateur Boxing Championships in Tampere, Finland. He is the older brother of boxer Kay Huste, and a two-time medalist at the World Amateur Boxing Championships.

Huste represented his native country at the 2000 Summer Olympics in Sydney, Australia. There he was stopped in the second round of the Men's Featherweight division by United States's eventual silver medalist Ricardo Juarez. He also competed at the 1996 Summer Olympics in Atlanta, Georgia.
