= Kirkor Kirkorov =

Bulgarian boxer (born 1968)

Personal information
- Full name: Kirkor Mikhaylov Kirkorian
- Nationality: Bulgaria
- Born: March 4, 1968 (age 58) Varna
- Height: 1.68 m (5 ft 6 in)
- Weight: 57 kg (126 lb)

Sport
- Sport: Boxing
- Weight class: Featherweight
- Club: Chernomore, Varna
Medal record
World Amateur Championships
Gold medal – first place	1991 Sydney	Featherweight
Silver medal – second place	1989 Moscow	Featherweight
European Amateur Championships
Gold medal – first place	1989 Athens	Featherweight

Kirkor Kirkorov (Bulgarian: Киркор Киркоров; born March 4, 1968, as Krikor Kirkorian) is a retired Bulgarian boxer who competed for his native country at the 1992 Summer Olympics in Barcelona, Spain. There he was defeated in the first round of the Men's Featherweight Division (– 57 kg) by Germany's eventual gold medalist Andreas Tews.

Kirkorov also competed at the 1988 Summer Olympics, reaching the third round before falling to South Korea's Lee Jae-Hyuk. He won the world title in his weight division in 1991, after having claimed the silver medal two years earlier in Moscow.
