= Ramaz Paliani =

Georgian boxer (born 1973)

Personal information
- Full name: რამაზ ფალიანი (Ramaz Paliani)
- Nickname: Razzamatazz
- Nationality: Georgia
- Born: 21 August 1973 (age 52) Mestia, Georgian SSR, Soviet Union
- Height: 1.72 m (5 ft 8 in)
- Weight: 57 kg (126 lb)

Sport
- Sport: Boxing
- Weight class: Featherweight
- Club: Moskva Sports Club
Medal record
Olympic Games
Representing the Unified Team
Bronze medal – third place	1992 Barcelona	Featherweight
World Amateur Championships
Representing Georgia
Bronze medal – third place	1993 Tampere	Featherweight
Representing Turkey
Gold medal – first place	2001 Belfast	Featherweight
Bronze medal – third place	1999 Houston	Featherweight
European Amateur Championships
Representing Georgia
Silver medal – second place	1993 Bursa	Featherweight
Representing Russia
Gold medal – first place	1996 Vejle	Featherweight
Representing Turkey
Gold medal – first place	1998 Minsk	Featherweight
Gold medal – first place	2000 Tampere	Featherweight
Mediterranean Games
Representing Turkey
Gold medal – first place	2001 Tunis	Featherweight

Ramaz Paliani (Georgian: რამაზ ფალიანი; born 21 August 1973 in Mestia, Georgia) is a Georgian former amateur and professional boxer who represented the Unified Team, Georgia, Russia, and Turkey during his career. He is a multiple European Champion, World Champion, Olympic bronze medalist (1992), and later worked as a boxing coach.

== Early life and training ==
Paliani was born on 31 August 1973 in the urban-type settlement of Mestia. He began boxing at the age of 13 under Honored Coach of Georgia Alexey Dzhaparidze, training together with his brothers Zurab and Shalva, who also went on to become successful boxers.

He first came to prominence in 1990 at the European Junior Championships, where he sensationally won a gold medal in the 48 kg division. For this achievement, he was awarded the title of International Master of Sports of the USSR.

== Amateur career ==
=== Unified Team and Georgia ===
After several domestic victories, Paliani was included in the Unified Team at the 1992 Summer Olympics in Barcelona. Competing in the featherweight division, he confidently defeated three opponents but lost in the semifinal on points to Faustino Reyes of Spain, winning a bronze medal.

In 1993, representing Georgia, he won a bronze medal at the World Championships in Tampere and a silver medal at the European Championships in Bursa.

=== Russia ===
Due to poor training conditions with the Georgian team, Paliani accepted an invitation from Nikolai Khromov in 1994 to join the Russian national team. He went on to receive the title Honored Master of Sports of Russia.

In 1996, he won gold at the European Championships in Vejle, Denmark, and competed at the Atlanta Olympics, where he reached the quarterfinals. While competing for Russia, he trained under Nikolai Khromov, Anatoly Muradymov, and Alexander Chernoivanov.

=== Turkey ===
Following the 1996 Olympics, Paliani was forced to leave Russia after Georgia claimed rights to him as an athlete. He briefly returned to the Georgian team and considered applying for Greek citizenship, but in 1997 he accepted an offer from Turkey, competing under the name Ramazan.

For Turkey, he won gold at the 1998 European Championships in Minsk, a bronze medal at the 1999 World Championships in Houston, and another European gold at the 2000 European Championships in Tampere, becoming a three-time European Champion.

At the 2000 Summer Olympics in Sydney, he was eliminated after his third bout, losing by a single point to Kazakhstan's Bekzat Sattarkhanov. Despite the setback, 2001 was one of the most successful seasons of his career: he won gold at the World Championships in Belfast and at the Mediterranean Games in Tunisia.

== Professional career ==
At the peak of his career, Paliani moved to the United States in autumn 2002 to pursue professional boxing, training in Philadelphia. Over four years he fought in 15 bouts, failing to win only once — a draw against American David Diaz in a fight for the IBA lightweight title.

In November 2006, in his 16th professional bout, he was defeated by Raymond Narh of Ghana, after which he retired from professional boxing.

== Coaching career ==
After retiring, Paliani worked as a trainer in Philadelphia for several years. In 2009, at the invitation of the Georgian Amateur Boxing Federation, he became head coach of the Georgian national team.
