= Boxing at the 1988 Summer Olympics – Flyweight =

Olympic boxing tournament

Flyweight boxing at the Games of the XXIV Olympiad
- Venue: Jamsil Students' Gymnasium
- Dates: 18 September – 2 October 1988
- Competitors: 44 from 44 nations

Medalists
1st place, gold medalist(s)		Kim Kwang-sun	South Korea
2nd place, silver medalist(s)		Andreas Tews	East Germany
3rd place, bronze medalist(s)		Mario González	Mexico
3rd place, bronze medalist(s)		Timofey Skryabin	Soviet Union

The men's flyweight event was part of the boxing programme at the 1988 Summer Olympics. The weight class allowed boxers of up to 51 kilograms to compete. The competition was held from 18 September to 2 October 1988. 44 boxers from 44 nations competed. Kim Kwang-sun won the gold medal.

== Medalists ==
Gold	Kim Kwang-sun; South Korea
Silver	Andreas Tews; East Germany
Bronze	Mario González; Mexico
Bronze	Timofey Skryabin; Soviet Union

== Results ==
The following boxers took part in the event:

Rank	Name	Country
1	Kim Kwang-sun	South Korea
2	Andreas Tews	East Germany
3T	Mario González	Mexico
3T	Timofey Skryabin	Soviet Union
5T	Alfred Kotey	Ghana
5T	Benaissa Abed	Algeria
5T	Meluin de Leon	Dominican Republic
5T	Serafim Todorov	Bulgaria
9T	Manoj Pingale	India
9T	Benjamin Mwangata	Tanzania
9T	Emmanuel Nsubuga	Uganda
9T	János Váradi	Hungary
9T	Philippe Desavoye	France
9T	Andy Agosto	Puerto Rico
9T	Arthur Johnson	United States
9T	Gamal El-Din El-Koumy	Egypt
17T	Joseph Chongo	Zambia
17T	Teboho Mathibeli	Lesotho
17T	Husain Al-Mutairi	Kuwait
17T	Peter Ayesu	Malawi
17T	Mohamed Mahfood Sayed	South Yemen
17T	Aissa Moukrim	Morocco
17T	Roberto Jalnaiz	Philippines
17T	Wang Weiping	China
17T	Anthony Ikegu	Kenya
17T	Badie Ovnteni	Niger
17T	Hamed Halbouni	Syria
17T	Joe Lawlor	Ireland
17T	Bishnu Bahadur Singh	Nepal
17T	Nokuthula Tshabangu	Zimbabwe
17T	Setsuo Segawa	Japan
17T	Ramazan Gül	Turkey
33T	Vichai Khadpo	Thailand
33T	Johnny Bredahl Johansen	Denmark
33T	Zekaria Williams	Cook Islands
33T	Archer Fausto	Mozambique
33T	Sixto Vera	Paraguay
33T	Andrea Mannai	Italy
33T	Bonifacio García	Spain
33T	Tseyen-Oidovyn Tserennyam	Mongolia
33T	Simon Morales	Colombia
33T	David Griman	Venezuela
33T	John Lyon	Great Britain
33T	Amir Hussain	Iraq

=== First round ===
- Andy Agosto (PUR) def. Vichairachanon Khadpo (THA), 5:0
- Hamed Halbouni (SYR) def. Johnny Bredahl (DEN), RSC-2
- Timofey Skryabin (URS) def. Zekaria Williams (CIS), 5:0
- Joseph Lawlor (IRL) def. Archer Fausto (MOZ), KO-2
- Bishnu Bahadur Singh (NEP) def. Sixto Vera (PAR), 5:0
- Arthur Johnson (USA) def. Andrea Mannai (ITA), 5:0
- Nokuthula Tshabangu (ZIM) def. Bonifacio Garcia (ESP), 4:1
- Kim Kwang-Sun (KOR) def. Tseyen-Oidovyn Tserennyam (MGL), RSC-2
- Setsuo Segawa (JPN) def. Simon Morales (COL), 4:1
- Serafim Todorov (BUL) def. David Griman (VEN), 4:1
- Ramazan Gul (TUR) def. John Lyon (GBR), 4:1
- Gamal El-Komy (EGY) def. Amir Hussain (IRQ), 4:1

=== Second round ===
- Manoj Pingale (IND) def. Joseph Chongo (ZAM), 5:0
- Mario González (MEX) def. Teboho Mathibeli (LES), 5:0
- Alfred Kotey (GHA) def. Husain Al-Mutairi (KUW), RSC-1
- Benjamin Mwangata (TNZ) def. Peter Ayesu (MLW), 5:0
- Emmanuel Nsubuga (UGA) def. Salem Obeyb (YMD), KO-1
- Benaissa Abed (ALG) def. Aissa Moukrine (MAR), 3:2
- János Váradi (HUN) def. Roberto Jalnaiz (PHI), 4:1
- Andreas Tews (GDR) def. Wang Weipin (CHN), 5:0
- Philippe Desavoye (FRA) def. Anthony Ikegu (KEN), RSC-2
- Melvin de Leon (DOM) def. Badie Ovnteni (NIG), RSC-1
- Andy Agosto (PUR) def. Hamed Halbouni (SYR), 5:0
- Timofey Skryabin (URS) def. Joseph Lawlor (IRL), 5:0
- Arthur Johnson (USA) def. Bishnu Bahadur Singh (NEP), RSC-2
- Kim Kwang-Sun (KOR) def. Nokuthula Tshabangu (ZIM), RSC-2
- Serafim Todorov (BUL) def. Setsuo Segawa (JPN), 5:0
- Gamal El-Komy (EGY) def. Ramazan Gül (TUR), 4:1

=== Third round ===
- Mario González (MEX) def. Manoj Pingale (IND), 4:1
- Alfred Kotey (GHA) def. Benjamin Mwangata (TNZ), 5:0
- Benaissa Abed (ALG) def. Emmanuel Nsubuga (UGA), 3:2
- Andreas Tews (GDR) def. János Váradi (HUN), 5:0
- Melvin de Leon (DOM) def. Philippe Desavoye (FRA), 5:0
- Timofey Skryabin (URS) def. Andy Agosto (PUR), 5:0
- Kim Kwang-Sun (KOR) def. Arthur Johnson (USA), 5:0
- Serafim Todorov (BUL) def. Gamal El-Komy (EGY), walk-over

=== Quarterfinals ===
- Mario González (MEX) def. Alfred Kotey (GHA), walk-over
- Andreas Tews (GDR) def. Benaissa Abed (ALG), 5:0
- Timofey Skryabin (URS) def. Melvin de Leon (DOM), 3:2
- Kim Kwang-Sun (KOR) def. Serafim Todorov (BUL), 4:1

=== Semifinals ===
- Andreas Tews (GDR) def. Mario González (MEX), 5:0
- Kim Kwang-Sun (KOR) def. Timofey Skryabin (URS), 5:0

=== Final ===
- Kim Kwang-Sun (KOR) def. Andreas Tews (GDR), 4:1
