= Mongolia at the 1988 Summer Olympics =

- IOC code: MGL
- NOC: Mongolian National Olympic Committee

in Seoul
- Competitors: 28 in 5 sports
- Flag bearer: Badmaanyambuugiin Bat-Erdene
- Medals Ranked 46th: Gold 0 Silver 0 Bronze 1 Total 1

Summer Olympics appearances (overview)
- 1964; 1968; 1972; 1976; 1980; 1984; 1988; 1992; 1996; 2000; 2004; 2008; 2012; 2016; 2020; 2024

Mongolia competed at the 1988 Summer Olympics in Seoul, South Korea.

== Competitors ==
The following is the list of number of competitors in the Games.

Sport	Men	Women	Total
Archery	0	3	3
Boxing	7	–	7
Judo	6	–	6
Shooting	2	1	3
Wrestling	9	–	9
Total	24	4	28

== Medalists ==
Medal	Name	Sport	Event	Date
Bronze	Nergüin Enkhbat	Boxing	Lightweight	29 September

== Archery ==
Women

Athlete	Event	Ranking round		Eighth-final		Quarterfinal		Semifinal		Final	
Athlete	Event	Score	Rank	Score	Rank	Score	Rank	Score	Rank	Score	Rank
Dorjsembee or Dorjsembeegiin Erdenchimeg	Individual	1193	46	Did not advance							
Sambuu Oyuntsetseg	Individual	1202	44	Did not advance							
Suvd Tuul	Individual	1231	24	290	24	Did not advance					
Dorjsembee or Dorjsembeegiin Erdenchimeg; Sambuu Oyuntsetseg; Suvd Tuul	Team	3626	12					912	12	Did not advance	

== Boxing ==
Athlete	Event	Round of 64	Round of 32	Round of 16	Quarterfinals	Semifinals	Final
Athlete	Event	Opposition Result	Opposition Result	Opposition Result	Opposition Result	Opposition Result	Opposition Result
Nyamaagiin Altankhuyag	Bantamweight		Jablonski (POL); W 3:2	Lowey (IRL); W 3:2	Moolsan (THA); L 0:5	Did not advance	
Tserendorj Amarjargal	Featherweight	Pagendam (CAN); L RSCH	Did not advance				
Ochiryn Demberel	Light Flyweight	Kuroiwa (JPN); W KOH	M'jirih (MAR); L 2:3	Did not advance			
Nerguy Enkhbat	Lightweight		Perez (VEN); W 5:0	Turu (HUN); W RSCH	Marjouane (MAR); W 5:0	Cramme (SWE); L 2:3 (bronze)	Did not advance
Khaidavyn Gantulga	Welterweight		Hamilton (JAM); W RSCH	Wangila (KEN); L RET	Did not advance		
Sodnomdarjaagiin Altansükh	Light Welterweight	Suwanwichit (THA); W 3:2	Odindo (UGA); W RSCH	Kamau (KEN); W 5:0	Gies (FRG); L 1:4	Did not advance	
Tseyen-Oidovyn Tserennyam	Flyweight	Kim (KOR); L RSCH	Did not advance				

== Judo ==
Men

Athlete	Event	Round of 32	Round of 16	Quarterfinals	Semifinals	First Repechage Round	Repechage Quarterfinals	Repechage Semifinals	Final
Athlete	Event	Opposition Result	Opposition Result	Opposition Result	Opposition Result	Opposition Result	Opposition Result	Opposition Result	Opposition Result
Jamsran Dorjderem	−65kg	Rossers (AUS); W 1000-0000	Petřikov (TCH); L 0000-0000	Did not advance					
Jambal Ganbold	−71kg	Ayan (TUR); L 0000-1000	Did not advance						
Badrah Niamjav	−60kg	Zhang (CHN); L 0000-0000	Did not advance						
