= Boxing at the 1988 Summer Olympics – Bantamweight =

Olympic boxing tournament

Bantamweight boxing at the Games of the XXIV Olympiad
- Venue: Jamsil Students' Gymnasium
- Dates: 17 September – 1 October 1988
- Competitors: 48 from 48 nations

Medalists
1st place, gold medalist(s)		Kennedy McKinney	United States
2nd place, silver medalist(s)		Aleksandar Khristov	Bulgaria
3rd place, bronze medalist(s)		Jorge Eliécer Julio	Colombia
3rd place, bronze medalist(s)		Phajol Moolsan	Thailand

The men's bantamweight event was part of the boxing programme at the 1988 Summer Olympics. The weight class allowed boxers of up to 54 kilograms to compete. The competition was held from 17 September to 1 October 1988. 48 boxers from 48 nations competed. Kennedy McKinney won the gold medal.

== Medalists ==
Gold	Kennedy McKinney; United States
Silver	Aleksandar Khristov; Bulgaria
Bronze	Jorge Eliécer Julio; Colombia
Bronze	Phajol Moolsan; Thailand

== Results ==
The following boxers took part in the event:

Rank	Name	Country
1	Kennedy McKinney	United States
2	Aleksandar Khristov	Bulgaria
3T	Jorge Eliécer Julio	Colombia
3T	Phajol Moolsan	Thailand
5T	Steve Mwema	Kenya
5T	Nyamaagiin Altankhuyag	Mongolia
5T	Katsuyuki Matsushima	Japan
5T	Aleksandr Artemyev	Soviet Union
9T	Shahuraj Birajdar	India
9T	Alberto Machaze	Mozambique
9T	Abraham Torres	Venezuela
9T	John Lowey	Ireland
9T	René Breitbarth	East Germany
9T	Justin Chikwanda	Zambia
9T	Jimmy Mayanja	Sweden
9T	Slimane Zengli	Algeria
17T	Giovanni Pérez	Guatemala
17T	Ayewoubo Akomatsri	Togo
17T	Ram Bahadur Giri	Nepal
17T	Mike Deveney	Great Britain
17T	Marcus Priaulx	Australia
17T	Teekaram Rajcoomar	Mauritius
17T	Grzegorz Jabłoński	Poland
17T	Mohammed Sabo	Nigeria
17T	Vedat Tutuk	Turkey
17T	Felipe Nieves	Puerto Rico
17T	Moumouni Siuley	Niger
17T	Ibibongo Nduita	Zaire
17T	José de Jesús García	Mexico
17T	Byeon Jeong-il	South Korea
17T	Joilson Santana	Brazil
17T	Ndaba Dube	Zimbabwe
33T	Moustafa Mohammed Saleh	Iraq
33T	Edward Obewa	Uganda
33T	Magare Tshekiso	Botswana
33T	Samba Jacob Diallo	Guinea
33T	Michael Hormillosa	Philippines
33T	Thomas Stephens	Liberia
33T	Tiui Faamaoni	Western Samoa
33T	Haji Ally	Tanzania
33T	Saud Al-Muwaizri	Kuwait
33T	Mohamed Achik	Morocco
33T	Tad Joseph	Grenada
33T	Peter Anok	Sudan
33T	Jean-Marc Augustin	France
33T	Phetsmone Sonnavanh	Laos
33T	Manuel Gomes	Angola
33T	Lionel Francis	Antigua and Barbuda

=== First round ===
- John Lowey (IRL) def. Mustafa Saleh (IRQ), 5:0
- Vedat Tutuk (TUR) def. Edward Obewa (UGA) 3:2
- René Breitbarth (GDR) def. Magare Tshekiso (BTS), 5:0
- Felix Nieves (PUR) def. Samba Diallo (GUI), 5:0
- Jorge Eliécer Julio (COL) def. Michael Hormillosa (PHI), RSC-3
- Justin Chikwanda (ZAM) def. Thomas Stevens (LBR), RSC-1
- Moumouni Siuley (NIG) def. Tiui Faamaoni (SAM), RSC-3
- Ibibongo Nduita (ZAI) def. Haji Ally (TNZ), 3:2
- Katsuyoki Matsushima (JPN) def. Saud Al-Muwaizri (KUW), RSC-1
- Jimmy Majanya (SWE) def. Mohammed Achik (MAR), 4:1
- José García (MEX) def. Tad Joseph (GRN), RSC-1
- Aleksandar Khristov (BUL) def. Peter Anok (SUD), 4:1
- Jung-Il Byun (KOR) def. Jean-Marc Augustin (FRA), 5:0
- Joilson Santana (BRA) def. Phetsmone Sonnavanh (LAO), 5:0
- Slimane Zengli (ALG) def. Manuel Gomes (ANG), 5:0
- Ndaba Dube (ZIM) def. Lionel Francis (ANT), RSC-2
- Alexander Artemev (URS) def. Edouard Paulum (VAN), walk-over

=== Second round ===
- Kennedy McKinney (USA) def. Erick Perez (GUA), RSC-1
- Shahuraj Birajdor (IND) def. Ayewoubo Akouatsi (TOG), 5:0
- Stephen Mwema (KEN) def. Rambahadur Giri (NEP), RSC-2
- Alberto Machaze (MOZ) def. Mike Deveney (GBR), 5:0
- Phajol Moolsan (THA) def. Marcus Priaulx (AUS), 5:0
- Abraham Torres (VEN) def. Teekaram Rajcoomar (MTS), 5:0
- Nyamaagiin Altankhuyag (MGL) def. Grzegorz Jablonski (POL), 3:2
- John Lowey (IRL) def. Mohamed Sabo (NGA), 4:1
- René Breitbarth (GDR) def. Vedat Tutuk (TUR), 5:0
- Jorge Eliécer Julio (COL) def. Felix Nieves (PUR), 5:0
- Justin Chikwanda (ZAM) def. Moumouni Siuley (NIG), RSC-1
- Katsuyoki Matsushima (JPN) def. Ibibongo Nduita (ZAI), 5:0
- Jimmy Majanya (SWE) def. José García (MEX), 4:1
- Aleksandar Khristov (BUL) def. Jong-Il Byun (KOR), 4:1
- Slimane Zengli (ALG) def. Joilson Santana (BRA), 5:0
- Alexander Artemev (URS) def. Ndaba Dube (ZIM), RSC-1

=== Third round ===
- Kennedy McKinney (USA) def. Shahuraj Birajdor (IND), walk-over
- Stephen Mwema (KEN) def. Alberto Machaze (MOZ), 5:0
- Phajol Moolsan (THA) def. Abraham Torres (VEN), 3:2
- Nyamaagiin Altankhuyag (MGL) def. John Lowey (IRL), 3:2
- Jorge Eliécer Julio (COL) def. René Breitbarth (GDR), 4:1
- Katsuyoki Matsushima (JPN) def. Justin Chikwanda (ZAM), 3:2
- Aleksandar Khristov (BUL) def. Jimmy Majanya (SWE), 5:0
- Alexander Artemev (URS) def. Slimane Zengli (ALG), 5:0

=== Quarterfinals ===
- Kennedy McKinney (USA) def. Stephen Mwema (KEN), 5:0
- Phajol Moolsan THA def. Nyamaagiin Altankhuyag (MGL), 5:0
- Jorge Eliécer Julio (COL) def. Katsuyoki Matsushima (JPN), 3:2
- Aleksandar Khristov (BUL) def. Alexander Artemev (URS), 3:2

=== Semifinals ===
- Kennedy McKinney (USA) def. Phajol Moolsan (THA), RSC-1
- Aleksandar Khristov (BUL) def. Jorge Eliécer Julio (COL), 3:2

=== Final ===
- Kennedy McKinney (USA) def. Aleksandar Khristov (BUL), 5:0
