= Thailand at the 1988 Summer Olympics =

- IOC code: THA
- NOC: National Olympic Committee of Thailand

in Seoul
- Competitors: 14 in 4 sports
- Flag bearer: Somchai Chanthavanich
- Medals Ranked 46th: Gold 0 Silver 0 Bronze 1 Total 1

Summer Olympics appearances (overview)
- 1952; 1956; 1960; 1964; 1968; 1972; 1976; 1980; 1984; 1988; 1992; 1996; 2000; 2004; 2008; 2012; 2016; 2020; 2024

Thailand competed at the 1988 Summer Olympics in Seoul, South Korea. For the first time, a beauty queen accompanied the Thai athletes to march the Olympic Stadium in the person of Pornthip Nakhirunkanok, Miss Universe 1988, during the opening ceremonies.

== Competitors ==
The following is the list of number of competitors in the Games.

| Sport | Men | Women | Total |
|---|---|---|---|
| Athletics | 4 | 0 | 4 |
| Boxing | 6 | – | 6 |
| Sailing | 1 | 0 | 1 |
| Shooting | 1 | 2 | 3 |
| Total | 12 | 2 | 14 |

== Medalists ==
| Medal | Name | Sport | Event | Date |
|---|---|---|---|---|
| Bronze | Phajol Moolsan | Boxing | Bantamweight | 29 September |

== Results by event ==
=== Athletics ===
Men

| Athlete | Event | Qualification | | Final | | Rank |
| Athlete | Event | Time | Rank | Time | Rank | Rank |
|---|---|---|---|---|---|---|
| Visut Watanasin | Men's 100 metres | 10.88 | 7 | did not advance | | |
| Supas Tiprod; Visut Watanasin; Anuwat Sermsiri; Chainarong Wangganont | Men's 4 x 100 metres relay | 40.57 | 5 | did not advance | | |

=== Boxing ===
| Athlete | Event | First Round | Round of 32 | Round of 16 | Quarterfinals | Semifinals | Final | Rank |
| Athlete | Event | Opposition Result | Opposition Result | Opposition Result | Opposition Result | Opposition Result | Opposition Result | Rank |
|---|---|---|---|---|---|---|---|---|
| Chatchai Sasakul | Light flyweight | Bye | Rolón (PUR); W 3:2 | Maina (KEN); W 5:0 | Isaszegi (HUN); L 2:3 | did not advance | | |
| Vichairachanon Khadpo | Flyweight | Andy Agosto (PUR); L 0:5 | did not advance | | | | | |
| Phajol Moolsan | Bantamweight | Bye | Priaulx (AUS); W 5:0 | Torres (VEN); W 3:2 | Altankhuyag (MGL); W 5:0 | McKinney (USA); L RSC | Did not advance | Bronze medal |
| Wanchai Pongsri | Featherweight | Jafer (YMD); W RSC | Flores (PUR); W 5:0 | Dumitrescu (ROU); L 2:3 | did not advance | | | |
| Phat Hongram | Lightweight | Bye | Asif Dar (CAN); W RSC | Kane (GBR); L 1:4 | did not advance | | | |
| Pravit Suwanwichit | Light Welterweight | Altansükh (MGL); L 2:3 | did not advance | | | | | |

=== Sailing ===
Men

| Athlete | Event | Race | | | | | | | Total points | Total -1 | Final rank |
| Athlete | Event | 1 | 2 | 3 | 4 | 5 | 6 | 7 | Total points | Total -1 | Final rank |
|---|---|---|---|---|---|---|---|---|---|---|---|
| Anan Hohsuwan | RS:X | 35 | 23 | 31 | 24 | RET | 26 | 39 | 230 | 178 | 25 |

=== Shooting ===
Men

| Athlete | Event | Qualification | | Final | |
| Athlete | Event | Points | Rank | Points | Rank |
|---|---|---|---|---|---|
| Somchai Chanthavanich | Skeet | 138 | 50th | did not advance | |

Women

| Athlete | Event | Qualification | | Final | |
| Athlete | Event | Points | Rank | Points | Rank |
|---|---|---|---|---|---|
| Thiranun Jinda | 50 m rifle three positions | 561 | 34th | did not advance | |
| Rumpai Yamfang | 25 m pistol | 581 | 12th | did not advance | |
