= Aleksandar Khristov =

Bulgarian boxer (born 1964)

Personal information
- Full name: Александър Иванов Христов
- Nationality: Bulgaria
- Born: 28 July 1964 (age 61) Plovdiv
- Height: 1.70 m (5 ft 7 in)
- Weight: 54 kg (119 lb)

Sport
- Sport: Boxing
- Weight class: Bantamweight
- Club: Lokomotiv, Plovdiv
Medal record
Olympic Games
Silver medal – second place	1988 Seoul	Bantamweight
World Amateur Championships
Gold medal – first place	1993 Tampere	Bantamweight
European Amateur Championships
Gold medal – first place	1987 Turin	Bantamweight
Silver medal – second place	1985 Budapest	Bantamweight
Bronze medal – third place	1996 Vejle	Bantamweight

Aleksandar Khristov (Bulgarian: Александър Христов) (born 28 July 1964) is a retired boxer from Bulgaria, who became world champion and represented his native country at the 1988 Summer Olympics in Seoul, South Korea. There he won the silver medal in the bantamweight (51 – 54 kg) division. He also won three medals in the European Amateur Boxing Championships, including gold at the 1987 European Amateur Boxing Championships in Turin, Italy.

Khristov was the winning boxer in a disputed bantamweight bout in the 1988 Seoul Olympics when he was given a controversial 4–1 victory over South Korean opponent Jung-Il Byun, who refused to leave the ring for over an hour after Khristov was given the verdict.

== Results ==
1985 European Championships

- Defeated Hermann Leber (Austria) 5:0
- Defeated Relu Nistor (Romania) 5:0
- Defeated Jarmo Eskelinen (Finland) 5:0
- Lost to Ljubiša Simić (Yugoslavia) 1:4

1987 European Championships

- Defeated Mike Devanney (Scotland) RSC-3
- Defeated Ljubiša Simić (Yugoslavia) 5:0
- Defeated René Breitbarth (East Germany) 5:0
- Defeated Yuriy Alexandrov (Soviet Union) 5:0

1988 Summer Olympics

- Round of 64: Defeated Peter Anok (Sudan) by decision,4-1
- Round of 32: Defeated Jung-Il Byun (South Korea) by decision, 4–1
- Round of 16: Defeated Jimmy Majanya (Sweden) by decision, 5–0
- Quarterfinal Defeated Alexander Artemev (Soviet Union) by decision, 3–2
- Semifinal: Defeated Jorge Eliecer Julio (Colombia) by decision, 3–2
- Final: Lost to Kennedy McKinney (United States) by decision, 0-5 (was awarded silver medal)

1996 Summer Olympics

- Lost to Carlos Barreto (Venezuela) 3-9
