= Timofey Skryabin =

Moldovan boxer

Personal information
- Born: November 14, 1967 (age 58) Bălți, Moldovan SSR, Soviet Union
Medal record
Men's Boxing
Representing the Soviet Union
Olympic Games
Bronze medal – third place	1988 Seoul	Flyweight
European Amateur Championships
Silver medal – second place	1989 Athens	Bantamweight
Representing Moldova
Goodwill Games
Bronze medal – third place	1994 Saint Petersburg	Bantamweight

Timofey Skryabin (born November 14, 1967, in Bălți, Moldovan SSR) is a retired boxer from the former Soviet Union, who represented his native country at the 1988 Summer Olympics in Seoul, South Korea. There he won the bronze medal in the flyweight division (– 51 kg), one of several Moldovans to win medals at that event. A year later he captured the silver medal in the bantamweight category (– 54 kg) at the 1989 European Amateur Boxing Championships in Athens, Greece.

== 1988 Olympic results ==
- Round of 64: Defeated Zekaria Williams (Cook Islands) by decision, 5-0
- Round of 32: Defeated Joseph Lawlor (Ireland) by decision, 5-0
- Round of 16: Defeated Andy Agosto (Puerto Rico) by decision, 5-0
- Quarterfinal: Defeated Melvin de Leon (Dominican Republic) by decision, 3-2
- Semifinal: Lost to Kwang-Sun Kim (South Korea) by decision, 0-5 (was awarded bronze medal)
