= Ndaba Dube =

Zimbabwean boxer (born 1959)

Personal information
- Born: 7 January 1959 (age 67)
Medal record
Men's Boxing
Representing Zimbabwe
All-Africa Games
Silver medal – second place	1987 Nairobi	Bantamweight

Ndaba Dube (born 7 January 1959) is a former boxer who competed in the bantamweight (– 54 kg) division at the 1984 Summer Olympics and at the 1988 Summer Olympics.

Dube won a silver medal at the 1987 All-Africa Games, losing in the bantamweight final to Stephen Mwema of Kenya.

== Olympic results ==
Represented Zimbabwe as a Bantamweight at the 1984 Olympic Games.

- 1st round bye
- Defeated Amon Neequaye (Ghana) 5-0
- Defeated Louis Gomis (France) 5-0
- Lost to Héctor López (Mexico) 0-5

Represented Zimbabwe as a Bantamweight at the 1988 Olympic Games.

- Defeated Lionel Francis (Antigua and Barbuda) RSC-2
- Lost to Aleksandr Artemyev (Soviet Union) RSC-1
