= Jorge Eliécer Julio =

Colombian boxer (born 1969)

Jorge Eliecer Julio
Personal information
- Born: Jorge Eliecer Julio Rocha; April 4, 1969 (age 57) El Retén, Colombia
- Height: 5 ft 5 in (165 cm)
- Weight: Bantamweight; Super bantamweight

Boxing career
- Reach: 68 in (173 cm)
- Stance: Orthodox

Boxing record
- Total fights: 49
- Wins: 44
- Win by KO: 32
- Losses: 5
Medal record
Representing Colombia
Men's amateur boxing
Olympic Games
Bronze medal – third place	1988 Seoul	Bantamweight

Jorge Eliécer Julio Rocha (born April 4, 1969) is a Colombian former professional boxer who competed from 1989 to 2003. He is a two-time bantamweight champion, having held the WBA title from 1992 to 1993 and the WBO title from 1998 to 2000. He won a bronze medal in the bantamweight division as an amateur at the 1988 Summer Olympics.

== Amateur ==
At the 1988 Summer Olympics, he won a bronze medal in the men's Bantamweight category after losing to Aleksandar Khristov.

=== Olympic results ===
Below are the results of Jorge Eliecer Julio, a Colombia Bantamweight boxer who competed at the 1988 Seoul Olympics:

- Round of 64: Defeated Michael Hormillosa (Philippines) TKO 3
- Round of 32: Defeated Felipe Nieves (Puerto Rico) points
- Round of 16: Defeated Rene Breitbarth (East Germany) points
- Quarterfinal: Defeated Katsuyuki Matsushima (Japan) points
- Semifinal: Lost to Aleksandar Khristov (Bulgaria) points (was awarded bronze medal)

== Pro ==
Julio turned pro in 1989 and won his first twenty-six fights, culminating on 9 October 1992 with a win over southpaw Eddie Cook for the WBA Bantamweight title. He lost the belt unanimously to Junior Jones in 1993 but was the first to knock Jones down.

He captured the WBO Bantamweight title in 1998 but lost the belt 2000 to Johnny Tapia. His career then began to go downhill, and in 2002, he lost to Manny Pacquiao by TKO and again in 2003 to Israel Vázquez.

== See also ==
- List of bantamweight boxing champions

Achievements
Preceded by Eddie Cook	WBA bantamweight champion October 9, 1992 – October 23, 1993	Succeeded by Junior Jones
New title	WBO bantamweight champion Interim Title; July 28, 1997 - 1997; Promoted	Vacant Title next held by Fernando Montiel
Preceded by Robbie Regan; Retired	WBO bantamweight champion 1997 – January 8, 2000	Succeeded by Johnny Tapia
