= Mario González (Mexican boxer) =

Mexican boxer (born 1969)

Personal information
- Born: August 15, 1969 (age 56) Puebla, Mexico
Medal record
Men's Boxing
Representing Mexico
Olympic Games
Bronze medal – third place	1988 Seoul	Flyweight

Mariano "Mario" González Lugo (born August 15, 1969, in Puebla) is a Mexican former boxer who represented his native country at the 1988 Summer Olympics in Seoul, South Korea. There he won the bronze medal in the flyweight division.

He now resides in California, United States.

== Olympic results ==
- 1st round bye
- Defeated Teboho Mathibeli (Lesotho) 5-0
- Defeated Manoj Pingale (Indonesia) 4-1
- Defeated Alfred Kotey (Ghana) Walkover
- Lost to Andreas Tews (East Germany) 0-5
