= Joílson =

Joílson may refer to:

- Joílson (footballer, born 1976), born Joílson Rodrigues da Silva, Brazilian football midfielder
- Joílson (footballer, born 1979), born Joílson Rodrigues Macedo, Brazilian football defender
- Joílson (footballer, born 1991), born Joílson de Jesus Cardoso, Brazilian football defender
- Joílson Júnior (born 1998), Brazilian Greco-Roman wrestler
- Joilson Santana (born 1964), Brazilian boxer
