= Junior Jones =

American boxer

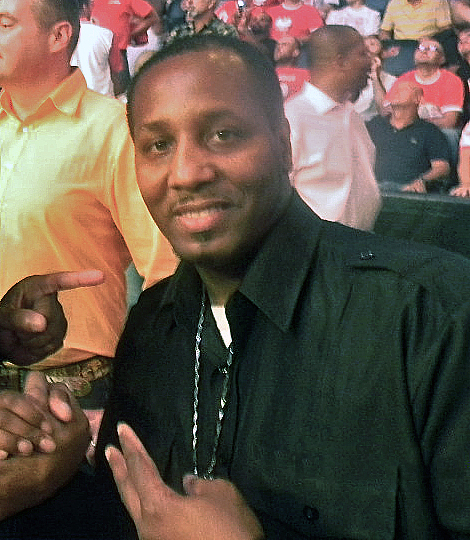
- Jones in 2010

Personal information
- Nickname: Poison
- Born: December 19, 1970 (age 55) Brooklyn, New York City, New York, U.S.
- Height: 5 ft 8 in (173 cm)
- Weight: Bantamweight; Super bantamweight; Featherweight; Super featherweight

Boxing career
- Reach: 71 in (180 cm)
- Stance: Orthodox

Boxing record
- Total fights: 56
- Wins: 50
- Win by KO: 28
- Losses: 6

Junior Jones (born December 20, 1970) is an American former professional boxer who competed from 1989 to 2002. He held world championships in two weight classes, including the World Boxing Association (WBA) bantamweight title from 1993 to 1994 and the World Boxing Organization (WBO) super bantamweight title from 1996 to 1997. He also held the International Boxing Organization (IBO) featherweight title from 1999 to 2000, which is a minor world title.

== Amateur career ==
As an amateur, Jones won the New York Golden Gloves tournament twice, winning the finals at Madison Square Garden in New York, New York.

== Professional career ==
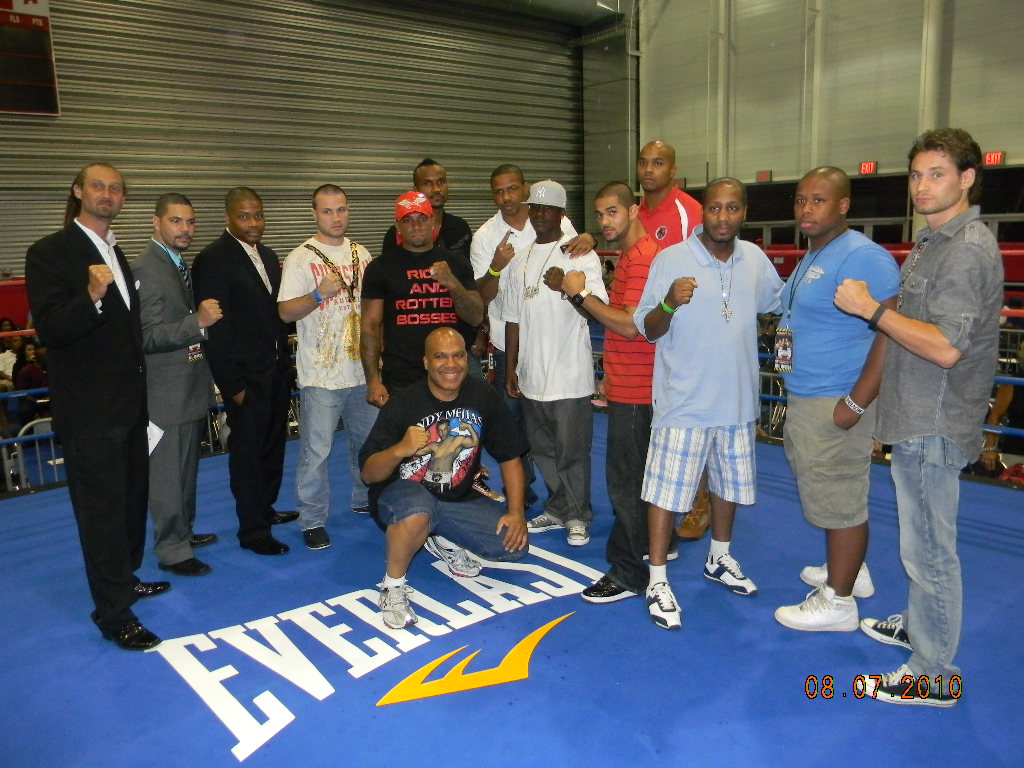
Jones (third from right) in 2010

Jones made his professional debut on June 8, 1989, scoring a first-round technical knockout against George Young. He won his first 32 professional boxing matches. Jones defeated Jorge Eliécer Julio to win the WBA bantamweight title on October 23, 1993. Jones made one successful defense, but lost his title after being stopped in eleven rounds by John Michael Johnson on April 22, 1994; Jones had previously defeated Johnson by unanimous decision (UD) on August 10, 1989.

More than two years later, on November 22, 1996, Jones scored his most significant victory by handing then-undefeated Mexican boxer Marco Antonio Barrera his first loss to win the WBO super bantamweight title, thus becoming a two-weight world champion. A controversy arose at the end of their fight when Barrera's cornermen entered the ring after he had been knocked down in the fifth round. This forced the referee to disqualify Barrera rather than award a TKO to Jones. On April 18, 1997, Jones won a close UD in their rematch to defend his title.

On December 19, 1997, Jones lost the title after being stopped in four rounds by 1988 Olympic gold medalist Kennedy McKinney. In his next fight, on September 12, 1998, Jones was again stopped in the fourth round, this time by WBC super bantamweight champion Érik Morales. On April 10, 1999, Jones won the vacant IBO featherweight title with a late stoppage of Richard Evatt in the eleventh round. In his first defense, on April 29, 2000, he lost the title to IBF featherweight champion Paul Ingle in an eleventh-round stoppage. Jones won three matches in a row, before losing his final boxing match to Ivan Alvarez in 2002.

He was inducted into the Atlantic City Boxing Hall of Fame in 2025.

== Professional boxing record ==
| 56 fights | 50 wins | 6 losses |
|---|---|---|
| By knockout | 28 | 5 |
| By decision | 21 | 1 |
| By disqualification | 1 | 0 |

| No. | Result | Record | Opponent | Type | Round, time | Date | Location | Notes |
|---|---|---|---|---|---|---|---|---|
| 56 | Loss | 50–6 | Ivan Alvarez | UD | 10 | Dec 6, 2002 | Silverdome, Pontiac, Michigan, U.S. | |
| 55 | Win | 50–5 | Johnny Walker | UD | 10 | Aug 29, 2002 | Arena Boxing Gym, St. Petersburg, Florida, U.S. | |
| 54 | Win | 49–5 | Mike Juárez | KO | 7 (12), 1:05 | Oct 20, 2001 | Stratosphere, Las Vegas, Nevada, U.S. | Won vacant IBA Continental super featherweight title |
| 53 | Win | 48–5 | Manuel Sepeda | UD | 10 | Apr 19, 2001 | Coliseum, New Haven, Connecticut, U.S. | |
| 52 | Loss | 47–5 | Paul Ingle | TKO | 11 (12), 1:16 | Apr 29, 2000 | Madison Square Garden, New York City, New York, U.S. | Lost IBO featherweight title; For IBF featherweight title |
| 51 | Win | 47–4 | Tracy Harris Patterson | MD | 10 | Nov 12, 1999 | The Orleans, Paradise, Nevada, U.S. | |
| 50 | Win | 46–4 | Richard Evatt | TKO | 11 (12), 2:31 | Apr 10, 1999 | MEN Arena, Manchester, England | Won vacant IBO featherweight title |
| 49 | Win | 45–4 | Tom Johnson | UD | 12 | Feb 17, 1999 | Van Andel Arena, Grand Rapids, Michigan, U.S. | Won vacant IBA super featherweight title |
| 48 | Loss | 44–4 | Érik Morales | TKO | 4 (12), 2:55 | Sep 12, 1998 | Bullring by the Sea, Tijuana, Mexico | For WBC super bantamweight title |
| 47 | Loss | 44–3 | Kennedy McKinney | TKO | 4 (12), 2:41 | Dec 19, 1997 | Madison Square Garden, New York City, New York, U.S. | Lost WBO super bantamweight title |
| 46 | Win | 44–2 | Marco Antonio Barrera | UD | 12 | Apr 18, 1997 | Las Vegas Hilton, Winchester, Nevada, U.S. | Retained WBO super bantamweight title |
| 45 | Win | 43–2 | Marco Antonio Barrera | DQ | 5 (12), 2:59 | Nov 22, 1996 | Ice Palace, Tampa, Florida, U.S. | Won WBO super bantamweight title; Barrera disqualified after his cornermen entered the ring too early |
| 44 | Win | 42–2 | Tommy Parks | TKO | 5 (10), 1:15 | Sep 10, 1996 | Beacon Theatre, New York City, New York, U.S. | |
| 43 | Win | 41–2 | Wilson Santos | UD | 10 | Aug 20, 1996 | Madison Square Garden, New York City, New York, U.S. | |
| 42 | Win | 40–2 | Orlando Canizales | SD | 12 | Mar 23, 1996 | Madison Square Garden, New York City, New York, U.S. | Won IBC super bantamweight title |
| 41 | Win | 39–2 | Armando Navarro | TKO | 1 (10), 1:30 | Jan 12, 1996 | Madison Square Garden, New York City, New York, U.S. | |
| 40 | Win | 38–2 | Alberto Rendon | UD | 10 | Dec 2, 1995 | Atlantic City, New Jersey, U.S. | |
| 39 | Win | 37–2 | Tomas Valdez | TKO | 2 | Oct 6, 1995 | Atlantic City, New Jersey, U.S. | |
| 38 | Win | 36–2 | Jesus Chavez | KO | 3 | Sep 9, 1995 | Fort Worth, Texas, U.S. | |
| 37 | Win | 35–2 | Shawn Wilkins | PTS | 10 | May 19, 1995 | New York City, New York, U.S. | |
| 36 | Win | 34–2 | Nelson Ramon Medina | UD | 10 | Mar 11, 1995 | Bally's Park Place, Atlantic City, New Jersey, U.S. | |
| 35 | Loss | 33–2 | Darryl Pinckney | TKO | 3 (10) | Oct 22, 1994 | Bally's Park Place, Atlantic City, New Jersey, U.S. | |
| 34 | Win | 33–1 | Orlando Fernandez | UD | 10 | Jun 12, 1994 | Atlantic City, New Jersey, U.S. | |
| 33 | Loss | 32–1 | John Michael Johnson | TKO | 11 (12), 1:21 | Apr 22, 1994 | Caesars Palace, Paradise, Nevada, U.S. | Lost WBA bantamweight title |
| 32 | Win | 32–0 | Elvis Álvarez | UD | 12 | Jan 8, 1994 | Friar Tuck Inn, Catskill, New York, U.S. | Retained WBA bantamweight title |
| 31 | Win | 31–0 | Jorge Eliécer Julio | UD | 12 | Oct 23, 1993 | Sands, Atlantic City, New Jersey, U.S. | Won WBA bantamweight title |
| 30 | Win | 30–0 | Francisco Alvarez | TKO | 12 (12), 2:40 | Aug 10, 1993 | Memorial Auditorium, Greenville, South Carolina, U.S. | Retained WBC Continental Americas bantamweight title |
| 29 | Win | 29–0 | Francisco Gomez | TKO | 2 (10), 1:19 | Jun 24, 1993 | Paramount Theatre, New York City, New York, U.S. | |
| 28 | Win | 28–0 | Juan Pablo Salazar | KO | 4 (12), 1:17 | Mar 6, 1993 | Madison Square Garden, New York City, New York, U.S. | Won vacant WBC Continental Americas bantamweight title |
| 27 | Win | 27–0 | Felizardo Carrasco | TKO | 2 (10), 2:00 | Jan 15, 1993 | Scottsdale, Arizona, U.S. | |
| 26 | Win | 26–0 | Jose Quirino | KO | 3 (12), 0:44 | Nov 13, 1992 | Thomas & Mack Center, Paradise, Nevada, U.S. | Retained USBA bantamweight title |
| 25 | Win | 25–0 | Eddie Rangel | TKO | 7 (12), 0:14 | Sep 17, 1992 | Paramount Theatre, New York City, New York, U.S. | Retained USBA bantamweight title |
| 24 | Win | 24–0 | Max Gomez | UD | 10 | Aug 20, 1992 | Steel Pier, Atlantic City, New Jersey, U.S. | |
| 23 | Win | 23–0 | Arturo Nava | TKO | 1 (10), 2:36 | Jun 23, 1992 | Knickerbocker Arena, Albany, New York, U.S. | |
| 22 | Win | 22–0 | Diego Avila | TKO | 5 (10), 2:59 | Mar 6, 1992 | Villa Roma Resort, Callicoon, New York, U.S. | |
| 21 | Win | 21–0 | Dadoy Andujar | TKO | 9 (12), 2:23 | Dec 12, 1991 | Atlantic City, New Jersey, U.S. | Won vacant USBA bantamweight title |
| 20 | Win | 20–0 | Rolando Bohol | UD | 10 | Oct 24, 1991 | Centrum, Worcester, Massachusetts, U.S. | |
| 19 | Win | 19–0 | Ramon Solis | TKO | 2 (10), 3:00 | Aug 15, 1991 | Steel Pier, Atlantic City, New Jersey, U.S. | |
| 18 | Win | 18–0 | Alejandro Sanabria | TKO | 7 (10), 1:16 | Jun 13, 1991 | The Blue Horizon, Philadelphia, Pennsylvania, U.S. | |
| 17 | Win | 17–0 | Jose Luis Vegagil | UD | 10 | May 2, 1991 | Etess Arena, Atlantic City, New Jersey, U.S. | |
| 16 | Win | 16–0 | Juan Carazo | MD | 10 | Mar 1, 1991 | Steel Pier, Atlantic City, New Jersey, U.S. | |
| 15 | Win | 15–0 | Marcos Claudio | TKO | 2 (8), 1:28 | Jan 20, 1991 | Trump's Castle, Atlantic City, New Jersey, U.S. | |
| 14 | Win | 14–0 | Claudemir Carvalho Dias | TKO | 2 (8) | Dec 13, 1990 | Steel Pier, Atlantic City, New Jersey, U.S. | |
| 13 | Win | 13–0 | Felix Marti | TKO | 6 (8), 2:16 | Oct 18, 1990 | Community War Memorial, Rochester, New York, U.S. | |
| 12 | Win | 12–0 | Adan Aviles | KO | 1, 1:57 | Sep 27, 1990 | Waterloo Village, Byram Township, New Jersey, U.S. | |
| 11 | Win | 11–0 | Anthony Barela | UD | 8 | Aug 5, 1990 | Convention Hall, Atlantic City, New Jersey, U.S. | |
| 10 | Win | 10–0 | Angel Gonzalez | TKO | 2, 2:47 | Jun 24, 1990 | Convention Hall, Atlantic City, New Jersey, U.S. | |
| 9 | Win | 9–0 | Guadalupe Barajas | KO | 1 (8) | May 18, 1990 | Villa Roma Resort, Callicoon, New York, U.S. | |
| 8 | Win | 8–0 | Fermin Rodriguez | KO | 4 | Mar 30, 1990 | Kansas City, Kansas, U.S. | |
| 7 | Win | 7–0 | Angel Gonzalez | UD | 6 | Feb 20, 1990 | Trump Plaza Hotel and Casino, Atlantic City, New Jersey, U.S. | |
| 6 | Win | 6–0 | Carlos Reyna | TKO | 2 (6), 2:40 | Jan 12, 1990 | Hofstra University, Hempstead, New York, U.S. | |
| 5 | Win | 5–0 | Ruben Nevarez | TKO | 5 | Nov 16, 1989 | Felt Forum, New York City, New York, U.S. | |
| 4 | Win | 4–0 | Charlie Montana | KO | 2 | Sep 14, 1989 | Beacon Theatre, New York City, New York, U.S. | |
| 3 | Win | 3–0 | John Michael Johnson | UD | 4 | Aug 10, 1989 | Felt Forum, New York City, New York, U.S. | |
| 2 | Win | 2–0 | Quincy Pratt | PTS | 4 | Jun 23, 1989 | Atlantic City, New Jersey, U.S. | |
| 1 | Win | 1–0 | George Young | TKO | 1 | Jun 8, 1989 | Trump's Castle, Atlantic City, New Jersey, U.S. | |

== Titles in boxing ==
=== Major world titles ===
- WBA bantamweight champion (118 lbs)
- WBO super bantamweight champion (122 lbs)

=== Minor world titles ===
- IBC super bantamweight champion (122 lbs)
- IBO featherweight champion (126 lbs)
- IBA super featherweight champion (130 lbs)

=== Regional/International titles ===
- USBA bantamweight champion (118 lbs)
- WBC Continental Americas bantamweight champion (118 lbs)
- IBA Continental super featherweight champion (130 lbs)

Sporting positions
Regional boxing titles
| Vacant Title last held by Eddie Cook | USBA bantamweight champion December 12, 1991 – March 1993; Vacated | Vacant Title next held by Mario Diaz |
| Vacant Title last held by Clarence Adams | WBC Continental Americas bantamweight champion March 6, 1993 – October 1993; Vacated | Vacant Title next held by Armando Salazar |
Minor world boxing titles
| Preceded by Orlando Canizales | IBC super bantamweight champion March 23, 1996 – November 1996; Vacated | Vacant Title next held by Max Gomez |
| Vacant Title last held by Gregorio Vargas | IBA super featherweight champion February 17, 1999 – October 1999; Vacated | Vacant Title next held by Jose Luis Castillo |
| Vacant Title last held by Radford Beasley | IBO featherweight champion April 10, 1999 – April 29, 2000 | Succeeded by Paul Ingle |
Major world boxing titles
| Preceded by Jorge Eliécer Julio | WBA bantamweight champion October 23, 1993 – April 22, 1994 | Succeeded by John Michael Johnson |
| Preceded by Marco Antonio Barrera | WBO super bantamweight champion November 22, 1996 – December 19, 1997 | Succeeded by Kennedy McKinney |
