= Ramazan Gül =

Turkish boxer

Personal information
- Nationality: Turkish
- Born: 14 February 1967 (age 58)

Sport
- Sport: Boxing

Ramazan Gül (born 14 February 1967) is a Turkish boxer. He competed in the men's flyweight event at the 1988 Summer Olympics. At the 1988 Summer Olympics, he defeated John Lyon of Great Britain before losing to Gamal El-Din El-Koumy of Egypt.
