= Nokuthula Tshabangu =

Zimbabwean boxer (born 1965)

Personal information
- Born: 22 July 1965 (age 60)
Medal record
Men's Boxing
Representing Zimbabwe
Commonwealth Games
| Silver medal – second place | 1990 Auckland | Flyweight |

Nokuthula Tshabangu (born 22 July 1965) is a boxer from Zimbabwe, who competed in the flyweight (– 51 kg) division at the 1988 Summer Olympics. In his first round bout, he defeated Bonifacio Garcia of Spain before losing to Kim Kwang-sun of South Korea in his second fight. He won a silver medal at the 1990 Commonwealth Games in the flyweight division, losing in the final to Wayne McCullough of Northern Ireland.

Tshabangu had a professional record of 7 wins and 9 losses from 1993 to 2003. His losses included a second-round knockout defeat to Jason Booth in Nottingham for the Commonwealth Flyweight Title on 26 February 2001.
