= Harold Mestre =

Colombian boxer (born 1968)

Personal information
- Nickname: El Ciclon
- Nationality: Colombian
- Born: September 11, 1968 (age 57) Cartagena, Colombia
- Weight: Bantamweight; Super bantamweight

Boxing career
- Stance: Orthodox

Boxing record
- Total fights: 41
- Wins: 29
- Win by KO: 23
- Losses: 11
- Draws: 1

Harold Mestre (born September 11, 1968) is a Colombian former professional boxer who competed from 1989 to 2003. He held the IBF bantamweight title in 1995.

== Professional career ==
Mestre turned professional in 1989 and compiled a record of 20–2–1 before defeating Juvenal Berrio, to win the vacant IBF bantamweight title. He would lose the title in his first defense against Mbulelo Botile. Mestre would not challenge for a world title again and would lose 8 of his final 9 fights including to prospect Andrés Ledesma.

== Professional boxing record ==
41 fights	29 wins	11 losses
By knockout	23	7
By decision	6	3
By disqualification	0	1
Draws	1	

No.	Result	Record	Opponent	Type	Round, time	Date	Location	Notes
41	Loss	29–11–1	Reynaldo Esquivia	KO	2 (6)	2003-02-07	Berrugas, Colombia	
40	Loss	29–10–1	Andrés Ledesma	PTS	6 (6)	2002-04-26	Cartagena, Colombia	
39	Loss	29–9–1	Jean Javier Sotelo	KO	2 (8)	2001-12-19	Magangue, Colombia	
38	Loss	29–8–1	Arcelio Ibarra	KO	3 (?)	2001-09-21	Cartagena, Colombia	
37	Win	29–7–1	Jorge Munadi	PTS	8 (8)	1999-09-25	Pasto, Colombia	
36	Loss	28–7–1	Jose Francisco Mendoza	KO	2 (?)	1998-02-14	Cartagena, Colombia	
35	Loss	28–6–1	Ernesto Grey	KO	4 (?)	1997-08-08	Cartagena, Colombia	
34	Loss	28–5–1	Pablo Osuna	PTS	10 (10)	1997-03-26	Cartagena, Colombia	
33	Loss	28–4–1	Arnel Barotillo	KO	2 (12)	1996-12-14	Camp Crame, Quezon City, Philippines	For IBF Inter-Continental Super bantamweight title
32	Win	28–3–1	Hector Ordonez	KO	5 (10)	1996-10-18	Coliseo Humberto Perea, Barranquilla, Colombia	
31	Win	27–3–1	Mario Cuellar	KO	1 (10)	1996-08-23	Gimnasio Chico de Hierro, Cartagena, Colombia	
30	Win	26–3–1	Luis Ojeda	PTS	10 (10)	1996-06-28	Coliseo Bernardo Caraballo, Cartagena, Colombia	
29	Win	25–3–1	Victor Tejedor	TKO	5 (?)	1996-05-24	Coliseo Kid Dumlop, Santa Marta, Colombia	
28	Win	24–3–1	Tirso Rivera	TKO	1 (?)	1996-03-29	Cartagena, Colombia	
27	Win	23–3–1	Elvis Mejia	TKO	3 (10)	1996-02-16	Cartagena, Colombia	Won vacant Colombian Super bantamweight title
26	Win	22–3–1	Ernesto Grey	TKO	4 (?)	1995-11-03	Cartagena, Colombia	
25	Loss	21–3–1	Mbulelo Botile	KO	2 (12)	1995-04-29	FNB Stadium, Johannesburg, South Africa	Lost IBF Bantamweight title
24	Win	21–2–1	Juvenal Berrio	TKO	8 (12)	1995-01-21	Coliseo Bernardo Caraballo, Cartagena, Colombia	Won vacant IBF Bantamweight title
23	Win	20–2–1	Marcial Sulbaran	KO	7 (10)	1994-04-15	Cartagena, Colombia	
22	Win	19–2–1	Patrocinio Ariza	KO	1 (?)	1993-12-17	Cartagena, Colombia	
21	Win	18–2–1	Antonio Zappa	KO	2 (?)	1993-10-01	Sincelejo, Colombia	
20	Win	17–2–1	Isidro Tejedor	TKO	2 (12)	1993-06-05	Cartagena, Colombia	Won vacant Colombian Bantamweight title
19	Win	16–2–1	Isaac Dominiquette	TKO	2 (?)	1993-03-18	Cartagena, Colombia	
18	Win	15–2–1	Ismael DeAvila	PTS	8 (8)	1992-06-05	Coliseo Bernardo Caraballo, Cartagena, Colombia	
17	Win	14–2–1	Atenor Solar	PTS	10 (10)	1992-03-03	Cartagena, Colombia	
16	Win	13–2–1	Johnny Negrete	TKO	2 (?)	1992-01-24	Cartagena, Colombia	
15	Win	12–2–1	Eugenio Pereira	TKO	8 (?)	1991-11-29	Cartagena, Colombia	
14	Win	11–2–1	Manuel Ariza	PTS	10 (10)	1991-09-27	Coliseo Bernardo Caraballo, Cartagena	
13	Win	10–2–1	Carlos Rocha	KO	2 (?)	1991-09-13	Coliseo Bernardo Caraballo, Cartagena	
12	Win	9–2–1	Antonio Zappa	KO	1 (?)	1991-08-16	Cartagena, Colombia	
11	Loss	8–2–1	Eduardo Negrete	DQ	6 (?)	1991-04-20	Plaza de Toros de Cartagena de Indias, Cartagena, Colombia	
10	Win	8–1–1	Ramiro Carvajal	KO	1 (?)	1991-03-08	Coliseo Bernardo Caraballo, Cartagena	
9	Win	7–1–1	Humberto Beleno	TKO	1 (?)	1991-02-22	Cartagena, Colombia	
8	Win	6–1–1	Jose Melendez	KO	1 (?)	1990-11-30	Gimnasio Terpel, Barranquilla, Colombia	
7	Loss	5–1–1	Reynaldo Hurtado	PTS	6 (6)	1990-07-19	Plaza de Toros de Cartagena de Indias, Cartagena, Colombia	
6	Win	5–0–1	Isaac Dominiquette	TKO	5 (?)	1990-06-15	Barranquilla, Colombia	
5	Draw	4–0–1	Ruben Poma	PTS	10 (10)	1990-04-19	Trujillo, Peru	
4	Win	4–0	Simon Morales	TKO	3 (?)	1990-02-02	Barranquilla, Colombia	
3	Win	3–0	Reynaldo Cassiani	KO	2 (?)	1989-11-27	Arjona, Colombia	
2	Win	2–0	Gabriel Alvarez	TKO	4 (?)	1989-07-16	Cartagena, Colombia	
1	Win	1–0	Holbert Manrique	PTS	4 (4)	1989-03-25	Cartagena, Colombia	

== See also ==
- List of world bantamweight boxing champions

Sporting positions
World boxing titles
Vacant Title last held by Orlando Canizales	IBF Bantamweight champion January 21, 1995 – April 29, 1995	Succeeded by Mbulelo Botile
