= Richard Evatt =

British boxer (1973–2012)

Richard Evatt (26 August 1973 – 17 July 2012), also called 'tiger', was a British amateur and professional boxer in the super featherweight division who was unsuccessful in his only opportunity to win a world title. He hailed from Coventry, West Midlands, United Kingdom.

== Amateur and professional career ==
Once described as one of the hardest hitting fighters in the world, Evatt wore tiger-skinned shorts into the ring. Evatt was the 1993 British ABA amateur boxing tournament champion in the bantamweight division. He turned professional on 18 December 1995, with a first-round knockout of veteran Kevin Shell on a boxing card held at Grosvenor House in London. He won fifteen consecutive professional bouts to open his career, winning the International Boxing Organization Inter-Continental Super Featherweight title by seventh round technical decision over South African fighter Mzukisi Oliphant on 23 February 1998, in Glasgow, Scotland. On 4 February 1999, in the best performance of his career, Evatt knocked down IBO Super Featherweight champion Junior Jones twice and won every round of the 12 rounder, and was close to stopping him before suddenly getting knocked out by Jones at 2:31 of the eleventh round. In his next bout, Evatt incurred a broken jaw in the first round of a bout for the vacant Commonwealth (British Empire) Super Featherweight title against Australian Super Featherweight champion Mick O'Malley at Ryton Sports Connexion in Coventry, England, and was unable to answer the bell for the second round. After losing to Ugandan fighter Isaac Sebaduuka, Evatt won four comeback bouts in a row in the United Kingdom, Evatt moved up in weight and was knocked out by British lightweight Craig Spacie and then retired with a final professional record of 20-5 with 14 knockouts. Following his retirement, Evatt struggled with alcohol and drug addiction. Doctors had ordered him to quit boxing after irregularities were found in his brain scan. After getting a medical all-clear in 2007, Evatt went back into training for a comeback at age 33, but never returned to the ring. Shortly before his death, Evatt was hospitalized for a broken jaw. He was believed to be living on the streets towards the end of his life.

== Death ==
Evatt was found collapsed and in need of medical assistance at the Salvation Army hostel in Harnall Lane West, Hillfields, Coventry, England. He died several hours later at the nearby University Hospital. The death was ruled murder, and area police apprehended a suspect. However, after the suspect was released on bail, police scheduled a post-mortem examination to determine whether drug use was involved in connection with Evatt's death. Evatt was survived by three young children.
