= Justin Chikwanda =

Zambian boxer (born 1967)

Personal information
- Nationality: Zambian
- Born: 27 November 1967 (age 57)

Sport
- Sport: Boxing

Justin Chikwanda (born 27 November 1967) is a Zambian boxer. He competed in the men's bantamweight event at the 1988 Summer Olympics.
