= John Michael Johnson =

American boxer

Personal information
- Nickname: Bam Bam
- Born: June 23, 1968 (age 58) San Antonio, Texas, U.S.
- Height: 5 ft 7 in (170 cm)
- Weight: Super flyweight; Bantamweight; Super bantamweight; Featherweight

Boxing career
- Reach: 69 in (175 cm)
- Stance: Orthodox

Boxing record
- Total fights: 42
- Wins: 31
- Win by KO: 23
- Losses: 11

John Michael Johnson (born June 23, 1968, in San Antonio, Texas, USA) is a retired American bantamweight boxer. He made his professional debut in 1986 and was a WBA bantamweight world champion

== Professional career ==
Known as "Bam Bam," Johnson turned professional in 1986. In 1994 he won the WBA bantamweight title by knocking out Junior Jones in the 11th round. Later that year, Johnson controversially lost the belt in his first defense to Daorung Chuvatana in Thailand. Near the end of the first round, Johnson sustained a cut above his right eye from a headbutt, however, the referee ruled that it was caused by a punch and the fight was called off upon the recommendation of the ringside doctor, resulting in a first round technical knockout victory for Chuwatana. Johnson immediately filed a protest on the grounds that the injury had been caused by a headbutt and that a technical draw should have been declared. In 1999 he challenged Lehlohonolo Ledwaba for the vacant IBF super bantamweight world title but lost by decision.

In 2001 Johnson made a comeback and scored four victories, including a technical knockout over Antonio Diaz and a knockout in the first round over Augie Sanchez. Due to his success, he was named Ring Magazine comeback of the year. Johnson lost both of his bouts in 2002 and retired later in the year.

On September 29, 2014, Johnson lost an eight-round fight to Ricardo Alvarez by unanimous decision.

== Professional boxing record ==
42 fights	31 wins	11 losses
By knockout	23	2
By decision	8	9

No.	Result	Record	Opponent	Type	Round, time	Date	Location	Notes
42	Loss	31–11	Omar Castillo	TKO	5 (6)	2019-11-16	Event Center, San Antonio, Texas, U.S.	
41	Loss	31–10	Ricardo Álvarez	UD	8 (8)	2014-09-29	State Farm Arena, Hidalgo, Texas, U.S.	
40	Win	31–9	Steve Trumble	UD	4 (4)	2013-11-16	Event Center, San Antonio, Texas, U.S.	
39	Loss	30–9	Ángel Chacón	UD	12 (12)	2002-10-27	Mario Morales Coliseum, San Juan, Puerto Rico	For vacant IBA featherweight title
38	Loss	30–8	Oscar León	UD	12 (12)	2002-04-05	Alumni Arena, Buffalo, New York, U.S.	Lost IBA featherweight title
37	Win	30–7	Augie Sanchez	KO	1 (12)	2001-12-07	Fantasy Springs Resort Casino, Indio, California, U.S.	Won vacant IBA featherweight title
36	Win	29–7	Harold Grey	KO	7 (12)	2001-09-23	Sunset Station, San Antonio, Texas, U.S.	Won vacant IBA super-bantamweight title
35	Win	28–7	Antonio Diaz	TKO	3 (10)	2001-08-04	United Palace, Washington Heights, New York, U.S.	
34	Win	27–7	David Murillo	SD	10 (10)	2001-05-25	Ciudad Juárez, Mexico	
33	Loss	26–7	José Rojas	UD	10 (10)	2000-05-20	Grand Casino, Tunica, Mississippi, U.S.	
32	Loss	26–6	Lehlo Ledwaba	UD	12 (12)	1999-05-29	Carousel Casino, Hammanskraal, South Africa	For vacant IBF super-bantamweight title
31	Win	26–5	Jorge Alberto Reyes	TKO	3 (10)	1998-11-13	Las Vegas Hilton, Winchester, Nevada, U.S.	
30	Win	25–5	Arturo Estrada	UD	8 (8)	1998-08-05	Rosedale Park, San Antonio, Texas, U.S.	
29	Win	24–5	Jose Guadalupe Rangel	KO	7 (10)	1998-02-07	Uvalde, Texas, U.S.	
28	Win	23–5	Richard Dinkins	TKO	6 (?)	1997-12-05	Amphitheater, Pompano Beach, Florida, U.S.	
27	Win	22–5	Martin Solorio	TKO	5 (10)	1997-09-10	San Antonio, Texas, U.S.	
26	Win	21–5	Jesus Montiel	TKO	4 (8)	1997-04-19	San Antonio, Texas, U.S.	
25	Win	20–5	Felizardo Carrasco	TKO	2 (10)	1996-03-18	County Coliseum, El Paso, Texas, U.S.	
24	Win	19–5	Lazaro Padilla	UD	10 (10)	1996-01-24	San Antonio, Texas, U.S.	
23	Loss	18–5	Daorung Chuvatana	TKO	1 (12)	1994-07-16	Municipal Stadium, Uttaradit, Thailand	Lost WBA bantamweight title
22	Win	18–4	Junior Jones	TKO	11 (12)	1994-04-22	Caesars Palace, Paradise, Nevada, U.S.	Won WBA bantamweight title
21	Win	17–4	Arturo Estrada	RTD	7 (10)	1993-12-22	Marriott Riverwalk, San Antonio, Texas, U.S.	
20	Win	16–4	Rodolfo Robles	TKO	6 (10)	1993-08-26	Marriott Riverwalk, San Antonio, Texas, U.S.	
19	Win	15–4	Arturo Estrada	KO	6 (10)	1993-06-21	Marriott Riverwalk, San Antonio, Texas, U.S.	
18	Win	14–4	Erbeu Montalvo	KO	8 (?)	1993-05-15	Carrizo Springs, Texas, U.S.	
17	Win	13–4	Sergio Alvarez	KO	1 (?)	1993-02-15	Nuevo Laredo, Mexico	
16	Win	12–4	Abner Barajas	UD	12 (12)	1992-05-24	Sunken Gardens, San Antonio, Texas, U.S.	Won vacant USBA super-flyweight title
15	Win	11–4	Roland Gomez	TKO	2 (?)	1991-08-16	Rosedale Park, San Antonio, Texas, U.S.	
14	Win	10–4	Armando Diaz	UD	10 (10)	1991-03-02	Callaghan Plaza, San Antonio, Texas, U.S.	
13	Win	9–4	Javier Díaz	TD	5 (12)	1990-08-15	Eagle Pass, Texas, U.S.	Won WBC Continental Americas super-flyweight title
12	Win	8–4	Rodolfo Robles	KO	3 (?)	1990-05-06	Sunken Gardens, San Antonio, Texas, U.S.	
11	Loss	7–4	Johnny Tapia	UD	8 (8)	1989-10-17	State Fair, Phoenix, Arizona, U.S.	
10	Loss	7–3	Junior Jones	UD	4 (4)	1989-08-10	Felt Forum, New York City, New York, U.S.	
9	Win	7–2	Miguel Martinez	TKO	2 (6)	1988-12-15	Convention Center, Tucson, Arizona, U.S.	
8	Win	6–2	Marco Antonio Lopez	TKO	1 (4)	1988-11-23	Convention Center, Tucson, Arizona, U.S.	
7	Win	5–2	John Vasquez	TKO	1 (6)	1987-11-10	Freeman Coliseum, San Antonio, Texas, U.S.	
6	Win	4–2	Jesse Alviar	TKO	3 (6)	1987-08-15	Freeman Coliseum, San Antonio, Texas, U.S.	
5	Loss	3–2	Renaldo Carter	UD	6 (6)	1987-05-30	Las Vegas Hilton, Winchester, Nevada, U.S.	
4	Win	3–1	Anthony Lopez	TKO	2 (4)	1987-05-01	Fiesta Plaza Mall, San Antonio, Texas, U.S.	
3	Win	2–1	Fernando Puente	TKO	2 (4)	1987-03-15	Fiesta Plaza Mall, San Antonio, Texas, U.S.	
2	Loss	1–1	John Vasquez	MD	4 (4)	1986-09-10	Randy's Auditorium, San Antonio, Texas, U.S.	
1	Win	1–0	Jesse Alviar	UD	4 (4)	1986-07-25	Convention Center Arena, San Antonio, Texas, U.S.	

== Personal life ==
Johnson was married to Sandra Johnson. They have three children, John Michael Johnson Jr., Alexandra Marie Johnson, and Jessica Michelle Johnson.

== See also ==
- List of world bantamweight boxing champions

Sporting positions
Regional boxing titles
Vacant Title last held by Robert Quiroga	WBC Continental Americas super-flyweight champion August 15, 1990 – 1990; Vacated	Vacant Title next held by Armando Salazar
Vacant Title last held by Johnny Tapia	USBA super-flyweight champion May 24, 1992 – 1993; Vacated	Vacant Title next held by José Manuel Díaz
Minor World boxing titles
Vacant Title last held by Jorge Lacierva	IBA super-bantamweight champion September 23, 2001 – 2002; Vacated	Vacant Title next held by Danny Romero
Vacant Title last held by Héctor Velázquez	IBA featherweight champion December 7, 2001 – April 5, 2002	Succeeded by Oscar León
Major World boxing titles
Preceded by Junior Jones	WBA bantamweight champion April 22, 1994 – July 16, 1994	Succeeded by Daorung Chuvatana
