= Frank Toledo =

American boxer

Frankie Toledo
Personal information
- Nickname: The Shark
- Born: Frank Efram Toledo; April 12, 1970 (age 56) Newark, New Jersey, U.S.
- Height: 5 ft 6 1/2 in (169 cm)
- Weight: Super bantamweight; Featherweight

Boxing career
- Reach: 67 in (170 cm)
- Stance: Southpaw

Boxing record
- Total fights: 51
- Wins: 43
- Win by KO: 18
- Losses: 7
- Draws: 1

Frank Toledo (born April 12, 1970) is an American boxer who held the International Boxing Federation (IBF) featherweight championship in 2001.

== Biography ==
Toledo, born in Newark, New Jersey, fought out of Paterson, New Jersey. He became a professional boxer in 1989. In 1993 and 1994, he defeated future world champions Clarence "Bones" Adams and Hector Acero Sanchez. In 1995, he fought Marco Antonio Barrera for Barrera's World Boxing Organization super bantamweight title. Barrera knocked him out in the second round.

In 1999, he defeated former IBF bantamweight champion Orlando Canizales, though in 2000, he lost to former champion Manuel Medina. On April 6, 2001, he defeated Mbulelo Botile for the IBF featherweight title. He did not hold the title long, as he lost it on November 11 of that year to former foe Medina. He continued fighting until 2004, but never fought for a world title again.

== Professional boxing record ==
51 fights	43 wins	7 losses
By knockout	18	3
By decision	25	4
Draws	1	

No.	Result	Record	Opponent	Type	Round, time	Date	Location	Notes
51	Loss	43–7–1	James Wayka	UD	6 (6)	2004-09-30	Prairie Meadows, Altoona, Iowa, U.S.	
50	Win	43–6–1	John Hoffman	TKO	6 (6)	2003-10-10	Lakeside Casino, Osceola, Iowa, U.S.	
49	Win	42–6–1	Len Martinez	TKO	6 (8)	2002-06-28	Meskwaki Casino, Meskwaki Settlement, Iowa, U.S.	
48	Win	41–6–1	Gene Vassar	TKO	5 (10)	2002-05-10	Lakeside Casino, Osceola, Iowa, U.S.	
47	Loss	40–6–1	Manuel Medina	TKO	6 (12)	2001-11-16	The Orleans, Paradise, Nevada, U.S.	Lost IBF featherweight title
46	Win	40–5–1	Mbulelo Botile	UD	12 (12)	2001-04-06	Texas Station, North Las Vegas, Nevada, U.S.	Won IBF featherweight title
45	Win	39–5–1	John Roby	UD	6 (6)	2000-11-04	Coliseum, Marshalltown, Iowa, U.S.	
44	Win	38–5–1	Lee Cargle	UD	6 (6)	2000-08-25	Convention Center, Des Moines, Iowa, U.S.	
43	Loss	37–5–1	Manuel Medina	UD	10 (10)	2000-05-19	The Orleans, Paradise, Nevada, U.S.	
42	Win	37–4–1	Idelfonso Bernal	KO	3 (6)	2000-02-17	River Center, Davenport, Iowa, U.S.	
41	Win	36–4–1	Orlando Canizales	SD	10 (10)	1999-09-24	The Blue Horizon, Philadelphia, Pennsylvania, U.S.	
40	Win	35–4–1	Raheem Stone	TKO	2 (6)	1999-07-23	Ice Arena, Urbandale, Iowa, U.S.	
39	Win	34–4–1	Oney Hellems	UD	12 (12)	1999-02-10	Meskwaki Casino, Meskwaki Settlement, Iowa, U.S.	
38	Win	33–4–1	Chuck Dairy	TKO	5 (8)	1998-11-19	Palace Theater, Altoona, Iowa, U.S.	
37	Win	32–4–1	Teddy Worth	PTS	8 (8)	1998-07-28	Mountaineer Casino, New Cumberland, West Virginia, U.S.	
36	Win	31–4–1	Steve Maddux	TKO	5 (10)	1998-01-31	Convention Center, Des Moines, Iowa, U.S.	
35	Win	30–4–1	Joe Lafontant	UD	10 (10)	1997-06-13	Jaffa Shrine Center, Altoona, Pennsylvania, U.S.	
34	Loss	29–4–1	Cassius Baloyi	UD	12 (12)	1996-11-15	St. Petersburg Coliseum, St. Petersburg, Florida, U.S.	Lost WBU super-bantamweight title
33	Win	29–3–1	Max Gomez	UD	12 (12)	1996-06-09	Fernwood Resort, Bushkill, Pennsylvania, U.S.	Won WBU super-bantamweight title
32	Win	28–3–1	Tony Saladin	RTD	4 (?)	1996-03-27	Robert Treat Center, Newark, New Jersey, U.S.	
31	Win	27–3–1	Dominick Monaco	UD	10 (10)	1995-11-21	The Roxy, Boston, Massachusetts, U.S.	
30	Win	26–3–1	Julio Rivera	TKO	2 (?)	1995-09-15	Everett Arena, Concord, New Hampshire, U.S.	
29	Win	25–3–1	Anthony Montana	TKO	2 (?)	1995-08-19	Hyatt Regency Hotel, Knoxville, Tennessee, U.S.	
28	Loss	24–3–1	Marco Antonio Barrera	TKO	2 (12)	1995-06-02	Foxwoods Resort Casino, Ledyard, Connecticut, U.S.	For WBO super-bantamweight title
27	Win	24–2–1	Roy Simpson	TKO	7 (10)	1995-04-21	The Blue Horizon, Philadelphia, Pennsylvania, U.S.	
26	Win	23–2–1	Juan Batista Bisono	PTS	10 (10)	1995-03-24	The Blue Horizon, Philadelphia, Pennsylvania, U.S.	
25	Draw	22–2–1	Nelson Ramon Medina	TD	2 (10)	1995-01-19	Ukrainian Cultural Center, Somerset, New Jersey, U.S.	
24	Win	22–2	Ishmael Sanders	TKO	8 (10)	1994-09-30	Fernwood Resort, Bushkill, Pennsylvania, U.S.	
23	Win	21–2	Felix Marti	TKO	6 (10)	1994-07-21	Hasbrouck Heights, New Jersey, U.S.	
22	Win	20–2	Hector Acero Sánchez	UD	10 (10)	1994-03-31	Bally's Park Place, Atlantic City, New Jersey, U.S.	
21	Win	19–2	Clarence Adams	RTD	4 (10)	1993-11-10	Harrah's Marina Hotel Casino, Atlantic City, New Jersey, U.S.	
20	Win	18–2	Steve Young	UD	10 (10)	1993-09-24	Hasbrouck Heights, New Jersey, U.S.	
19	Win	17–2	Melvin DeLeon	UD	8 (8)	1993-07-23	Sheraton Hotel, Hasbrouck Heights, New Jersey, U.S.	
18	Win	16–2	Manuel Santiago	UD	8 (8)	1993-06-18	Sheraton Hotel, Hasbrouck Heights, New Jersey, U.S.	
17	Win	15–2	Joe Lafontant	UD	8 (8)	1993-04-02	Catholic Youth Center, Trenton, New Jersey, U.S.	
16	Win	14–2	Angel Gonzalez	PTS	6 (6)	1993-02-27	Fernwood Resort, Bushkill, Pennsylvania, U.S.	
15	Win	13–2	Jose Carlos Beato	UD	6 (6)	1993-01-15	Fernwood Resort, Bushkill, Pennsylvania, U.S.	
14	Win	12–2	Tommy Barnes	UD	6 (6)	1992-09-25	The Great Gorge Resort, McAfee, New Jersey, U.S.	
13	Win	11–2	Wilfredo Vargas	PTS	8 (8)	1992-07-31	Caribe Hilton Hotel, San Juan, Puerto Rico	
12	Win	10–2	Robert Woods	TKO	2 (6)	1992-03-14	Forest City, North Carolina, U.S.	
11	Win	9–2	Roy Simpson	PTS	4 (4)	1992-02-08	Rock Springs Middle School, Denver, North Carolina, U.S.	
10	Win	8–2	Freddy Curiel	TKO	2 (6)	1992-02-01	Host Farm Hotel Resort, Lancaster, Pennsylvania, U.S.	
9	Win	7–2	Jose Luis Calderon	KO	1 (?)	1991-11-30	Forest City, North Carolina, U.S.	
8	Win	6–2	John Gaillard	UD	6 (6)	1991-06-10	Meadowlands Convention Center, Secaucus, New Jersey, U.S.	
7	Win	5–2	Shawn Wilkins	UD	4 (4)	1991-03-25	Meadowlands Convention Center, Secaucus, New Jersey, U.S.	
6	Win	4–2	Angel Gonzalez	UD	4 (4)	1990-11-01	Trump Taj Mahal, Atlantic City, New Jersey, U.S.	
5	Loss	3–2	Freddie Liberatore	TKO	6 (6)	1990-07-15	Tropicana, Atlantic City, New Jersey, U.S.	
4	Win	3–1	Luis Meléndez	UD	4 (4)	1990-04-28	Trump Taj Mahal, Atlantic City, New Jersey, U.S.	
3	Win	2–1	Antonio Gonzalez	UD	4 (4)	1990-03-18	Resorts Casino Hotel, Atlantic City, New Jersey, U.S.	
2	Loss	1–1	Benny Amparo	UD	4 (4)	1990-01-12	Trump Plaza Hotel and Casino, Atlantic City, New Jersey, U.S.	
1	Win	1–0	Donnie Archer	TKO	2 (4)	1989-12-12	Harrah's Marina Hotel Casino, Atlantic City, New Jersey, U.S.	

== See also ==
- List of male boxers
- List of southpaw stance boxers
- Boxing in Puerto Rico
- List of Puerto Rican boxing world champions
- List of world featherweight boxing champions

Sporting positions
Minor world boxing titles
Preceded by Max Gomez	WBU super-bantamweight champion June 9, 1996 – November 15, 1996	Succeeded by Cassius Baloyi
Major world boxing titles
Preceded by Mbulelo Botile	IBF featherweight champion April 6, 2001 – November 16, 2001	Succeeded by Manuel Medina
