= Jaklein Al-Duqom =

Jordanian table tennis player

Personal information
- Native name: جاكلين الدقم
- National team: Jordan
- Born: February 17, 1964 (age 61)

Sport
- Country: Jordan
- Sport: Table tennis
- Updated on 13 July 2017

Jaklein Al-Duqom (Arabic: جاكلين الدقم; born March 10, 1964) is a Jordanian Olympic table tennis player. She represented Jordan in 1988 Summer Olympics in Seoul.

== Olympic participation ==
=== Seoul 1988 ===
Table tennis – Women's Singles – Preliminary Round

Group B
Rank	Athlete	W	L	GW	GL	PW	PL	KOR	TCH	TPE	HKG	VEN	JOR
1	Yang Young-Ja (KOR)	5	0	15	0	316	168	X	3–0	3–0	3–0	3–0	3–0
2	Renata Kasalová (TCH)	4	1	12	5	325	262	0–3	X	3–0	3–2	3–0	3–0
3	Lin Li-Ju (TPE)	3	2	9	7	270	247	0–3	0–3	X	3–1	3–0	3–0
4	Hui So Hung (HKG)	2	3	9	9	309	288	0–3	2–3	1–3	X	3–0	3–0
5	Elizabeth Popper (VEN)	1	4	3	12	213	272	0–3	0–3	0–3	0–3	X	3–0
6	Jaklein Al-Duqom (JOR)	0	5	0	15	119	315	0–3	0–3	0–3	0–3	0–3	X
