= Michael Hormillosa =

Filipino boxer (born 1968)

Personal information
- Nationality: Filipino
- Born: June 18, 1968 (age 57) Iloilo, Philippines
- Height: 5 ft 8 in (173 cm)
- Weight: 119 lb (54 kg)

Boxing career
- Weight class: Bantamweight

Michael Hormillosa (born June 18, 1968) is a Filipino boxer. He competed in the men's bantamweight event at the 1988 Summer Olympics.

== Career ==
In 1988, Hormillosa competed in a fight-off organized by the Philippine Olympic Committee (POC) for a slot at the 1988 Summer Olympics, as there was a leadership dispute in the Association of Boxing Alliances in the Philippines (ABAP) between Roilo Golez (who had endorsed him) and Mel Lopez. Despite putting more damage on his opponent, he lost his fight 2–3 and his coach filed a protest to the POC. The protest was a success, and POC president Jose Sering overturned the judges' decision, as they were biased towards Lopez's boxers. A few days later, the Manila regional trial court issued a restraining order to Sering, preventing him from sending Hormillosa to the Olympics. Sering had to endorse his and five other boxers' participation in front of the Court of Appeals, which was successful. Hormillosa's opponent also stepped aside, clearing the way for him to participate. He was the last Filipino athlete to officially qualify for that year's Olympics.

Hormillosa competed in the men's bantamweight event during the Olympics, where he got to face off against Jorge Julio Rocha of Colombia in what would be his first international fight. He lost, as the fight was ruled an RSC (referee stopped contest) in the third round. Almost all of the Filipino boxers who competed that year did not make it past the first round except for Leopoldo Serantes, who went on to win a bronze medal.
