= Alberto Machaze =

Mozambican boxer (born 1964)

Personal information
- Nationality: Mozambican
- Born: 30 November 1964 (age 61)

Sport
- Sport: Boxing

Alberto Machaze (born 30 November 1964) is a Mozambican boxer. He competed in the men's bantamweight event at the 1988 Summer Olympics.
