= Giovanni Pérez =

Guatemalan boxer

Personal information
- Nationality: Guatemalan
- Born: 29 June 1964 (age 62)

Sport
- Sport: Boxing

Giovanni Pérez (born 29 June 1964) is a Guatemalan boxer. He competed in the men's bantamweight event at the 1988 Summer Olympics. At the 1988 Summer Olympics, he lost to Kennedy McKinney of the United States.
