= Vedat Tutuk =

Turkish boxer (born 1963)

Personal information
- Nationality: Turkish
- Born: 5 October 1963 (age 63)

Sport
- Sport: Boxing

Vedat Tutuk (born 5 October 1963) is a Turkish boxer. He competed in the men's bantamweight event at the 1988 Summer Olympics.
