= Ljubiša Simić =

Yugoslav boxer

Olympic medal record

Representing Yugoslavia

Men's boxing

European Amateur Championships
Gold medal – first place	1985 Budapest	Bantamweight

Mediterranean Games
Silver medal – second place	1983 Casablanca	Flyweight
Gold medal – first place	1991 Athens	Bantamweight

World Cup
Bronze medal – third place	1985 Seoul	Bantamweight

Ljubiša Simić (Serbian Cyrillic: Љубиша Симић; born 27 February 1963 in Smederevo, SR Serbia, then Yugoslavia) is a former boxer from Yugoslavia, who competed in two Summer Olympics for his native country: in 1984 and in 1988. In both occasions he had an early exit from the tournament. Simić became professional in 1993, and recorded thirteen wins (six knock-outs) and three losses.

== Amateur Highlights ==
- 1984 Summer Olympics represented Yugoslavia as a Bantamweight. His result was:
  - Lost to Pedro Nolasco (Dominican Republic) in the Round of 64 by decision, 0-5
- 1985 European Amateur Champion at Bantamweight
- 1988 Summer Olympics represented Yugoslavia as a Featherweight. His results were:
  - 1st round bye
  - Lost to Mikhail Kazaryan (Soviet Union) 0-5
