= Kennedy McKinney =

American boxer

Personal information
- Nickname: King
- Born: January 10, 1966 (age 60) Hernando, Mississippi, U.S.
- Height: 5 ft 7 in (170 cm)
- Weight: Super bantamweight

Boxing career
- Reach: 68 in (173 cm)
- Stance: Orthodox

Boxing record
- Total fights: 43
- Wins: 36
- Win by KO: 19
- Losses: 6
- Draws: 1
Medal record
Men's boxing
Representing the United States
Olympic Games
Gold medal – first place	1988 Seoul	Bantamweight

Kennedy McKinney (born January 10, 1966) is an American former professional boxer, who won the bantamweight gold medal at the 1988 Summer Olympics. As a professional, he won the IBF and WBO super bantamweight titles.

== Military service ==
McKinney took up boxing while serving in the U.S. Army, private first class stationed at the Aberdeen Proving Ground in Maryland.

== Amateur career ==
- 1985 2nd place at United States Amateur Championships as a Flyweight, was stopped by Arthur Johnson
- 1986 2nd place at United States Amateur Championships as a Flyweight, losing by decision to Arthur Johnson
- 1987 3rd place at United States Amateur Championships as a Bantamweight, losing by decision to Michael Collins
- 1988 2nd place at United States Amateur Championships as a Bantamweight, losing by decision to Jemal Hinton
- Prior to the 1988 Olympics had several international duals where he fought Alexei Artemiev of the Soviet Union, Rene Breitbarth of East Germany, Aleksandar Hristov of Bulgaria and Byun Jung-il of South Korea, to whom he lost.
- 1988 qualified as a Bantamweight for the United States Olympic Team, avenging previous defeats versus Michael Collins, whom he beat three times and Jemal Hinton, all by decision.
- Won the Bantamweight Olympic gold medal at the Seoul Olympic Games. Results were:
  - Defeated Erick Perez (Guatemala) TKO 1
  - Defeated Shahuraj Birajdor (India) forfeit
  - Defeated Steve Mwema (Kenya) points
  - Defeated Phajol Moolsan (Thailand) TKO 1
  - Defeated Aleksandar Hristov (Bulgaria) points

McKinney claimed an amateur record of 214 wins, 13 losses.

== Professional career ==
Known as "King", McKinney was a cautious yet dynamic junior featherweight (super bantamweight) fighter who captured the IBF title in a bout against Welcome Ncita in 1992. Despite being staggered and taking a standing eight-count, McKinney was able to knock out Ncita in the eleventh round with a right hook.

After five defenses, among others a KO over Rudy Zavala and a points win over Ncita, he lost his belt to future star Vuyani Bungu, a fight which was deemed 1994 Upset of the Year by Ring Magazine.

Two years later he challenged undefeated Marco Antonio Barrera for the WBO super bantamweight title, a vicious battle in which he dropped Barrera in the 11th, but lost via TKO in the 12th. McKinney later took a rematch against Bungu, but lost a narrow split decision. Later that year, he did battle with Junior Jones who had upset Barrera in an exciting war, one which McKinney won via TKO.

McKinney then moved up a weight class to challenge Luisito Espinosa for the WBC featherweight title in 1998. Espinosa made quick work of McKinney, winning via a 2nd-round TKO.

After the loss to Espinosa, McKinney quickly lost steam. He would fight only five more times against scattered and limited opposition, three of which took place during a brief comeback run in 2002–03.

== Life after boxing ==
Kennedy now resides in Olive Branch, Mississippi, where he is simply known as "Coach McKinney". He is the Head Boxing Coach at the Prize Fight Gym in Southaven, Mississippi.

== Professional boxing record ==
43 fights	36 wins	6 losses
By knockout	19	2
By decision	17	4
Draws	1	

No.	Result	Record	Opponent	Type	Round, time	Date	Location	Notes
43	Loss	36–6–1	Greg Torres	UD	6	Apr 4, 2003	Mohegan Sun Casino, Uncasville, Connecticut, U.S.	
42	Win	36–5–1	Joseph Figueroa	UD	6	Jun 7, 2002	DeSoto Civic Center, Southaven, Mississippi, U.S.	
41	Win	35–5–1	Gene Vassar	UD	6	Apr 26, 2002	Horizon Theatre, Muncie, Indiana, U.S.	
40	Loss	34–5–1	Jorge Antonio Paredes	UD	10	Nov 19, 1999	Grand Casino, Tunica, Mississippi, U.S.	
39	Win	34–4–1	Mario Díaz	UD	10	Aug 28, 1999	Grand Casino, Tunica, Mississippi, U.S.	
38	Loss	33–4–1	Luisito Espinosa	TKO	2 (12), 0:47	Nov 28, 1998	Fantasy Springs Resort Casino, Indio, California, U.S.	For WBC featherweight title
37	Win	33–3–1	Junior Jones	TKO	4 (12), 2:41	Dec 19, 1997	Madison Square Garden, Manhattan, Nea York, U.S.	Won WBO super bantamweight title
36	Win	32–3–1	Luigi Camputaro	TKO	5 (10), 0:10	Oct 5, 1997	Fort Hood, Texas, U.S.	
35	Win	31–3–1	Hector Acero Sánchez	UD	12	May 6, 1997	Medieval Times, Lyndhurst, New Jersey, U.S.	Won vacant IBF-USBA super bantamweight title
34	Loss	30–3–1	Vuyani Bungu	SD	12	Apr 5, 1997	Carousel Hotel & Casino, Temba, South Africa	For IBF super bantamweight title
33	Win	30–2–1	Néstor López	SD	10	Sep 14, 1996	Great Western Forum, Inglewood, California, U.S.	
32	Win	29–2–1	Johnny Lewus	UD	12	May 5, 1996	Grand Casino, Biloxi, Mississippi, U.S.	Won vacant IBF-USBA super bantamweight title
31	Loss	28–2–1	Marco Antonio Barrera	TKO	12 (12), 2:05	Feb 3, 1996	Great Western Forum, Inglewood, California, U.S.	For WBO super bantamweight title
30	Win	28–1–1	John Lowey	TKO	8 (12), 1:10	Aug 26, 1995	Bismarck Hotel, Chicago, Illinois, U.S.	Won inaugural WBU super bantamweight title
29	Loss	27–1–1	Vuyani Bungu	SD	12	Aug 20, 1994	Carousel Casino, Temba, South Africa	Lost IBF super bantamweight title
28	Win	27–0–1	Welcome Ncita	MD	12	Apr 16, 1994	Convention Center, South Padre Island, Texas, U.S.	Retained IBF super bantamweight title
27	Win	26–0–1	José Rincones	KO	5 (12), 2:40	Feb 19, 1994	Carousel Casino, Temba, South Africa	Retained IBF super bantamweight title
26	Win	25–0–1	Jesus Salud	UD	12	Oct 16, 1993	Caesars Tahoe, Stateline, Nevada, U.S.	Retained IBF super bantamweight title
25	Win	24–0–1	Rudy Zavala	TKO	3 (12), 2:08	Jul 17, 1993	The Pyramid, Memphis, Tennessee, U.S.	Retained IBF super bantamweight title
24	Win	23–0–1	Richard Duran	UD	12	Apr 17, 1993	ARCO Arena, Sacramento, California, U.S.	Retained IBF super bantamweight title
23	Win	22–0–1	Welcome Ncita	KO	11 (12), 2:48	Dec 2, 1992	Teatro Tenda, Tortolì, Italy	Won IBF super bantamweight title
22	Win	21–0–1	Paul Banke	RTD	6 (12), 3:00	Mar 20, 1992	Caesars Palace, Paradise, Nevada, U.S.	Retained IBF-USBA super bantamweight title
21	Win	20–0–1	Sugar Baby Rojas	UD	12	Feb 9, 1992	Harrah's Casino Hotel, Atlantic City, New Jersey, U.S.	Won IBF-USBA super bantamweight title
20	Win	19–0–1	Max Gomez	SD	8	Dec 7, 1991	Reno-Sparks Convention Center, Reno, Nevada, U.S.	
19	Win	18–0–1	Vicente Gonzalez	UD	10	Sep 24, 1991	Reseda Country Club, Los Angeles, California, U.S.	
18	Win	17–0–1	Mauro Montes	TKO	1 (6), 1:35	Sep 13, 1991	Plaza Hotel & Casino, Las Vegas, Nevada, U.S.	
17	Win	15–0–1	Jerome Coffee	TKO	6 (10), 2:26	May 23, 1991	Bally's Las Vegas, Paradise, Nevada, U.S.	
16	Win	15–0–1	Edel Geronimo	TKO	5 (8), 2:21	Mar 17, 1991	Bally's Las Vegas, Paradise, Nevada, U.S.	
15	Win	14–0–1	Richard Abila	KO	5 (10), 2:21	Jan 18, 1991	Sands Hotel and Casino, Paradise, Nevada, U.S.	
14	Win	13–0–1	Adriano Arreola	TKO	5 (6), 1:37	Dec 20, 1990	Bally's Las Vegas, Paradise, Nevada, U.S.	
13	Win	12–0–1	Gabriel Castro	TKO	4 (4), 1:12	Nov 8, 1990	Bally's Las Vegas, Paradise, Nevada, U.S.	
12	Win	11–0–1	José Luis Martínez	UD	6	Jul 29, 1990	Veterans Memorial Coliseum, Phoenix, Arizona, U.S.	
11	Win	10–0–1	Jorge Rodríguez	UD	8	Jun 26, 1990	Reseda Country Club, Los Angeles, California, U.S.	
10	Win	9–0–1	Antonio González	TKO	7 (8), 2:44	Jun 15, 1990	Bally's Las Vegas, Paradise, Nevada, U.S.	
9	Win	8–0–1	Chilo Guzman	TKO	4 (6), 1:44	May 29, 1990	Reseda Country Club, Los Angeles, California, U.S.	
8	Win	7–0–1	Godfrey Johnson	TKO	2 (4), 0:34	May 3, 1990	Quality Inn Hotel, Newark, New Jersey, U.S.	
7	Win	6–0–1	Reggie Johnson	TKO	2 (4)	Apr 21, 1990	Red Deer Arena, Red Deer, Canada	
6	Win	5–0–1	José Luis Martínez	SD	4	Oct 31, 1989	Showboat Hotel and Casino, Las Vegas, Nevada, U.S.	
5	Draw	4–0–1	David Sanchez	TD	2 (6), 1:35	Aug 29, 1989	Showboat Hotel and Casino, Las Vegas, Nevada, U.S.	Sanchez unable to continue after being cut by an accidental headbutt
4	Win	4–0	David Moreno	UD	6	Jun 12, 1989	Caesars Palace, Paradise, Nevada, U.S.	
3	Win	3–0	Damion Sutton	UD	4	May 2, 1989	Harrah's Hotel & Casino, Stateline, Nevada, U.S.	
2	Win	2–0	Charles Hawkins	TKO	1 (4), 2:37	Mar 25, 1989	Hilton Hotel, Winchester, Nevada, U.S.	
1	Win	1–0	David Alers	TKO	2 (4), 2:42	Feb 24, 1989	Convention Center, Atlantic City, New Jersey, U.S.	

Sporting positions
Regional boxing titles
Preceded by Sugar Baby Rojas	USBA super bantamweight champion February 9 – December 2, 1992; Won IBF title	Vacant Title next held by Rudy Zavala
Vacant Title last held by Maui Diaz	USBA super bantamweight champion May 5, 1996 – December 19, 1997; Won WBO title	Vacant Title next held by Jason Pires
Minor boxing titles
New title	WBU super bantamweight champion August 26, 1995 – 1996	Vacant Title next held by Max Gomez
World boxing titles
Preceded by Welcome Ncita	IBF super bantamweight champion December 2, 1992 – August 20, 1994	Succeeded by Vuyani Bungu
Preceded by Junior Jones	WBO super bantamweight champion December 19, 1997 – May 30, 1998; Vacated	Vacant Title next held by Marco Antonio Barrera
