= Ibibongo Nduita =

Congolese boxer (born 1962)

Personal information
- Nationality: Congolese
- Born: 30 June 1962 (age 64)

Sport
- Sport: Boxing

Ibibongo Nduita (born 30 June 1962) is a Congolese boxer. He competed in the men's bantamweight event at the 1988 Summer Olympics.
