= Lionel Francis =

Antigua and Barbuda boxer

Personal information
- Nationality: Antigua and Barbuda
- Born: 14 June 1964 (age 62)

Sport
- Sport: Boxing

Lionel Francis (born 14 June 1964) is an Antigua and Barbuda boxer. He competed in the men's bantamweight event at the 1988 Summer Olympics. At the 1988 Summer Olympics, he lost to Ndaba Dube of Zimbabwe. Francis also represented Antigua and Barbuda at the 1987 Pan American Games.
