= José de Jesús García =

Mexican boxer (born 1968)

Personal information
- Nationality: Mexican
- Born: 22 June 1968 (age 58)

Sport
- Sport: Boxing

José de Jesús García (born 22 June 1968) is a Mexican boxer. He competed in the men's bantamweight event at the 1988 Summer Olympics.
