= Andrea Mannai =

Italian boxer

Personal information
- Born: 2 May 1963 (age 63) Quartu Sant'Elena, Italy
Medal record
Men's Boxing
Representing Italy
European Amateur Championships
Silver medal – second place	1985 Budapest	Flyweight
Bronze medal – third place	1987 Turin	Flyweight

Andrea Mannai (born 2 May 1963) is a retired male boxer from Italy, who won the bronze medal at the 1987 European Amateur Boxing Championships in the men's flyweight (– 51 kg) division. He represented his native country at the 1988 Summer Olympics and lost to Arthur Johnson of the United States on a 5-0 decision.
