= Mbulelo Botile =

South African boxer (born 1972)

Personal information
- Born: Mbulelo Botile; 23 July 1972 (age 54) Duncan Village, Buffalo City, South Africa
- Height: 5 ft 5 in (165 cm)
- Weight: Bantamweight; Featherweight; Super-featherweight

Boxing career
- Reach: 67 in (170 cm)
- Stance: Orthodox

Boxing record
- Total fights: 31
- Wins: 27
- Win by KO: 16
- Losses: 4

Mbulelo Botile (born 23 July 1972) is a South African former professional boxer who competed between 1989 and 2005. He is a world champion in two weight classes, having held the International Boxing Federation (IBF) bantamweight title from 1995 to 1997, and the IBF and International Boxing Organization (IBO) featherweight titles from 2000 to 2001.

== Professional career ==
Botile turned pro in 1989 and won his first twenty-one bouts, including fifteen straight to set up a shot at the IBF Bantamweight title against Harold Mestre in 1995. Botile won with a second-round KO. He successfully defended the title five times before losing the belt to Tim Austin in 1997, by a seventh-round TKO.

Botile moved up in weight and in 2000 took on IBF Featherweight title and IBO title of Paul Ingle, winning the belt with a twelfth-round TKO. He lost a decision in his first defence against Frank Toledo in 2001 and then moved up to Super featherweight. He took on former champion Cassius Baloyi in 2002, losing by an eleventh-round TKO. Botile retired after the loss, but came back in 2005, only to be knocked out by Anthony Tshehla.

Botile later stated that the injuries Paul Ingle sustained during their 2000 bout caused him such distress that he never regained his focus on boxing..

== Professional boxing record ==
| 31 fights | 27 wins | 4 losses |
|---|---|---|
| By knockout | 16 | 3 |
| By decision | 11 | 1 |

| No. | Result | Record | Opponent | Type | Round, time | Date | Location | Notes |
|---|---|---|---|---|---|---|---|---|
| 31 | Loss | 27–4 | Anthony Tshehla | KO | 7 (12), 1:33 | 11 Mar 2005 | Wild Coast Sun, Mzamba, South Africa | For WBA Pan-American super-featherweight title |
| 30 | Loss | 27–3 | Cassius Baloyi | TKO | 11 (12), 2:58 | 26 Oct 2002 | Carnival City, Brakpan, South Africa | For IBO super-featherweight title |
| 29 | Loss | 27–2 | Frank Toledo | UD | 12 | 6 Apr 2001 | Texas Station Casino, Las Vegas, Nevada, U.S. | Lost IBF featherweight title |
| 28 | Win | 27–1 | Paul Ingle | TKO | 12 (12), 0:20 | 16 Dec 2000 | Sheffield Arena, Sheffield, England | Won IBF and IBO featherweight titles |
| 27 | Win | 26–1 | Héctor Lizárraga | MD | 10 | 19 Nov 1999 | D.C. Armory, Washington, D.C., U.S. | |
| 26 | Win | 25–1 | Maxim Pugachev | TKO | 3 (8), 1:55 | 24 Sep 1999 | Rhydycar Leisure Centre, Merthyr Tydfil, Wales | |
| 25 | Win | 24–1 | David Turner | UD | 10 | 18 Nov 1998 | Civic Center, La Porte, Indiana, U.S. | |
| 24 | Win | 23–1 | Dino Olivetti | RTD | 5 (10) | 28 Jul 1998 | Carousel Casino, Hammanskraal, South Africa | |
| 23 | Win | 22–1 | Mustapha Hame | UD | 10 | 21 Mar 1998 | Carousel Casino, Hammanskraal, South Africa | |
| 22 | Loss | 21–1 | Tim Austin | TKO | 8 (12), 2:20 | 19 Jul 1997 | Arena, Nashville, Tennessee, U.S | Lost IBF bantamweight title |
| 21 | Win | 21–0 | Aristead Clayton | UD | 12 | 26 Nov 1996 | Belle of Baton Rouge Casino, Baton Rouge, Louisiana, U.S. | Retained IBF bantamweight title |
| 20 | Win | 20–0 | Marlon Arlos | RTD | 8 (12), 3:00 | 29 Jun 1996 | Fort Hare University Hall, Alice, South Africa | Retained IBF bantamweight title |
| 19 | Win | 19–0 | Ancee Gedeon | KO | 11 (12), 0:35 | 2 Apr 1996 | Civic Center, Providence, Rhode Island, U.S. | Retained IBF bantamweight title |
| 18 | Win | 18–0 | Reynaldo Hurtado | KO | 2 (12), 2:58 | 25 Nov 1995 | Basil Kenyon Stadium, East London, South Africa | Retained IBF bantamweight title |
| 17 | Win | 17–0 | Sammy Stewart | UD | 12 | 4 Jul 1995 | Carousel Casino, Hammanskraal, South Africa | Retained IBF bantamweight title |
| 16 | Win | 16–0 | Harold Mestre | KO | 2 (12), 1:24 | 29 Apr 1995 | FNB Stadium, Johannesburg, South Africa | Won IBF bantamweight title |
| 15 | Win | 15–0 | Eddy Saenz | TKO | 4 (10) | 4 Mar 1995 | Carousel Casino, Hammanskraal, South Africa | |
| 14 | Win | 14–0 | Jose Ayala | UD | 10 | 19 Nov 1994 | Carousel Casino, Hammanskraal, South Africa | |
| 13 | Win | 13–0 | Javier Diaz | UD | 10 | 15 Oct 1994 | Martin Field, Laredo, Texas, U.S. | |
| 12 | Win | 12–0 | Derrick Whiteboy | SD | 12 | 29 May 1994 | Lentegeur Civic Centre, Cape Town, South Africa | |
| 11 | Win | 11–0 | Sipho Cekiso | KO | 2 (8) | 9 May 1993 | Selbourne Park, East London, South Africa | |
| 10 | Win | 10–0 | Raymond Molefi | TKO | 6 (?) | 26 Sep 1992 | Orient Theatre, East London, South Africa | |
| 9 | Win | 9–0 | Zolani Makhubalo | PTS | 10 | 12 Apr 1992 | Mdantsane Sun, East London, South Africa | |
| 8 | Win | 8–0 | Mxolisi Mayekiso | PTS | 8 | 17 Nov 1991 | Orient Theatre, East London, South Africa | |
| 7 | Win | 7–0 | Philani Kali | TKO | 2 (8) | 14 Oct 1991 | Orient Theatre, East London, South Africa | |
| 6 | Win | 6–0 | Xolile Duda | KO | 2 (6) | 25 Nov 1990 | Orient Theatre, East London, South Africa | |
| 5 | Win | 5–0 | David Molahloe | TKO | 2 (6) | 14 Oct 1990 | Orient Theatre, East London, South Africa | |
| 4 | Win | 4–0 | Thembikile Blaweni | KO | 1 (4) | 26 Aug 1990 | Orient Theatre, East London, South Africa | |
| 3 | Win | 3–0 | Dolly Qhoni | PTS | 6 | 5 May 1990 | Gompo Hall, East London, South Africa | |
| 2 | Win | 2–0 | Dallas Mooi | KO | 3 (6) | 29 Oct 1989 | Gompo Hall, East London, South Africa | |
| 1 | Win | 1–0 | Makhosandile Mbiza | TKO | 3 (6) | 30 Jul 1989 | Independence Stadium, Bisho, South Africa | |

== Titles in boxing ==
=== Major world titles ===
- IBF bantamweight champion (118 lbs)
- IBF featherweight champion (126 lbs)

=== Minor world titles ===
- IBO featherweight champion (126 lbs)

== See also ==
- List of bantamweight boxing champions
- List of featherweight boxing champions

Sporting positions
Minor world boxing titles
| Preceded by Paul Ingle | IBO featherweight champion 16 December 2000 – 2001 | Vacant Title next held by Marco Antonio Barrera |
Major world boxing titles
| Preceded by Harold Mestre | IBF bantamweight champion 29 April 1995 – 19 July 1997 | Succeeded by Tim Austin |
| Preceded by Paul Ingle | IBF featherweight champion 16 December 2000 – 6 April 2001 | Succeeded by Frank Toledo |
