= Emmanuel Nsubuga (boxer) =

Ugandan boxer

Personal information
- Nationality: Ugandan
- Born: 24 December 1967 (age 57)

Sport
- Sport: Boxing

Emmanuel Nsubuga (born 24 December 1967) is a Ugandan boxer. He competed in the men's flyweight event at the 1988 Summer Olympics.
