= 1985 European Amateur Boxing Championships =

Boxing competitions

- Host city: Budapest
- Country: Hungary
- Athletes: 142
- Dates: 25 May–2 June

The Men's 1985 European Amateur Boxing Championships were held in Budapest, Hungary from May 25 to June 2; 1985. The 26th edition of the bi-annual competition was organised by the European governing body for amateur boxing, EABA. There were 142 fighters from across many European countries participated in the competition.

== Medal winners ==
| Event | Gold | Silver | Bronze |
|---|---|---|---|
| Light Flyweight (– 48 kilograms) | Rene Breitbarth; East Germany | Ivailo Marinov; Bulgaria | Róbert Isaszegi; Hungary Karimzhan Abdrakhmanov; Soviet Union |
| Flyweight (– 51 kilograms) | Dieter Berg; East Germany | Andrea Mannai; Italy | (Republic of Ireland) Shawn Casey; Ireland Krasimir Cholakov; Bulgaria |
| Bantamweight (– 54 kilograms) | (Socialist Federal Republic of Yugoslavia) Ljubisa Simic; Yugoslavia | Aleksandar Khristov; Bulgaria | Jarmo Eskelinen; Finland Tibor Botos; Hungary |
| Featherweight (– 57 kilograms) | Samson Khachatryan; Soviet Union | (Socialist Federal Republic of Yugoslavia) Dragan Konovalov; Yugoslavia | Tomasz Nowak; Poland Jari Gronroos; Finland |
| Lightweight (– 60 kilograms) | Emil Chuprenski; Bulgaria | Torsten Koch; East Germany | Nurlan Abdukalykov; Soviet Union Jose Tuominen; Finland |
| Light Welterweight (– 63.5 kilograms) | Siegfried Mehnert; East Germany | Imre Bacskai; Hungary | Vyacheslav Yanovski; Soviet Union (Socialist Federal Republic of Yugoslavia) Mirko Puzovic; Yugoslavia |
| Welterweight (– 67 kilograms) | Israel Akopkokhyan; Soviet Union | Joni Nyman; Finland | (Socialist Federal Republic of Yugoslavia) Dragan Vasiljevic; Yugoslavia Borislav Abadzhiev; Bulgaria |
| Light Middleweight (– 71 kilograms) | Michael Timm; East Germany | Babken Sagradyan; Soviet Union | Sandor Hranek; Hungary Mikhail Takov; Bulgaria |
| Middleweight (– 75 kilograms) | Henry Maske; East Germany | Zoltan Fuzesy; Hungary | Filko Rushchukliev; Bulgaria Doru Maricescu; Romania |
| Light Heavyweight (– 81 kilograms) | Nurmagomed Shanavazov; Soviet Union | Markus Bott; West Germany | John Beckles; England (Socialist Federal Republic of Yugoslavia) Pero Tadic; Yugoslavia |
| Heavyweight (– 91 kilograms) | Alexander Yagubkin; Soviet Union | Gyula Alvics; Hungary | Deyan Kirilov; Bulgaria Arnold Vanderlyde; Netherlands |
| Super Heavyweight (+ 91 kilograms) | Ferenc Somodi; Hungary | Vyacheslav Yakovlev; Soviet Union | Janusz Zarenkiewicz; Poland (Socialist Federal Republic of Yugoslavia) Aziz Salihu; Yugoslavia |

== Medal table ==
| Rank | Nation | Gold | Silver | Bronze | Total |
|---|---|---|---|---|---|
| 1 | East Germany (GDR) | 5 | 1 | 0 | 6 |
| 2 | Soviet Union (URS) | 4 | 2 | 3 | 9 |
| 3 | Hungary (HUN) | 1 | 3 | 3 | 7 |
| 4 | Bulgaria (BUL) | 1 | 2 | 5 | 8 |
| 5 | Yugoslavia (YUG) | 1 | 1 | 4 | 6 |
| 6 | Finland (FIN) | 0 | 1 | 3 | 4 |
| 7 | Italy (ITA) | 0 | 1 | 0 | 1 |
| 7 | West Germany (BRD) | 0 | 1 | 0 | 1 |
| 9 | Poland (POL) | 0 | 0 | 2 | 2 |
| 10 | England (ENG) | 0 | 0 | 1 | 1 |
| 10 | Ireland (IRL) | 0 | 0 | 1 | 1 |
| 10 | Netherlands (NED) | 0 | 0 | 1 | 1 |
| 10 | Romania (ROU) | 0 | 0 | 1 | 1 |
| Totals (13 entries) | | 12 | 12 | 24 | 48 |
