= Setsuo Segawa =

Japanese boxer

Personal information
- Nationality: Japanese
- Born: 16 June 1968 (age 56); Yamada, Japan

Sport
- Sport: Boxing

Setsuo Segawa (瀬川設男, Segawa Setsuo, born 16 June 1968) is a Japanese former professional boxer who competed from 1993 to 2004, challenging for the OPBF bantamweight title in 1998. As an amateur, he competed in the men's flyweight event at the 1988 Summer Olympics. At the 1988 Summer Olympics, he defeated Simon Morales of Colombia, before losing to Serafim Todorov of Bulgaria.
