= John Lowey (boxer) =

Irish boxer (born 1966)

Personal information
- Nickname: "The quiet man"
- Nationality: British
- Born: John Lowey; 6 August 1966 (age 60) Dundonald, Northern Ireland, U.K.
- Weight: super bantamweight

Boxing career
- Stance: Orthodox

Boxing record
- Total fights: 31
- Wins: 26
- Win by KO: 17
- Losses: 5
- Draws: 0
- No contests: 0

John Lowey (born 6 August 1966 in Ballybeen, Dundonald, Northern Ireland) is a former professional boxer. Lowey fought at super bantamweight and won the IBO world title in 1995. He represented Ireland at the 1988 Olympics in the bantamweight category. He defeated Mustafa Selah of Iraq and Mohamed Sabo of Nigeria in his first two bouts before being eliminated by Nyamaagiin Altankhuyag of Mongolia in the Round of 16.

John Lowey became the inaugural IBO Super Bantamweight World Champion when he defeated Juan Camero in 1995.

== 1988 Olympic record ==
Below are the results of John Lowey, a Northern Irish bantamweight boxer who competed at the 1988 Seoul Olympics:

- Round of 64: defeated Mustafa Saleh (Iraq) by decision, 5-0
- Round of 32: defeated Mohamed Sabo (Nigeria) by decision, 4-1
- Round of 16 lost to Nyamaagiin Altankhuyag (Mongolia) by decision, 2-3
