= Jean-Marc Augustin =

French boxer

Personal information
- Nationality: French
- Born: 7 April 1965 (age 61) Paris, France

Sport
- Sport: Boxing

Jean-Marc Augustin (born 7 April 1965) is a French boxer. He competed in the men's bantamweight event at the 1988 Summer Olympics.
