= Michael Timm =

German boxer (1962–2025)

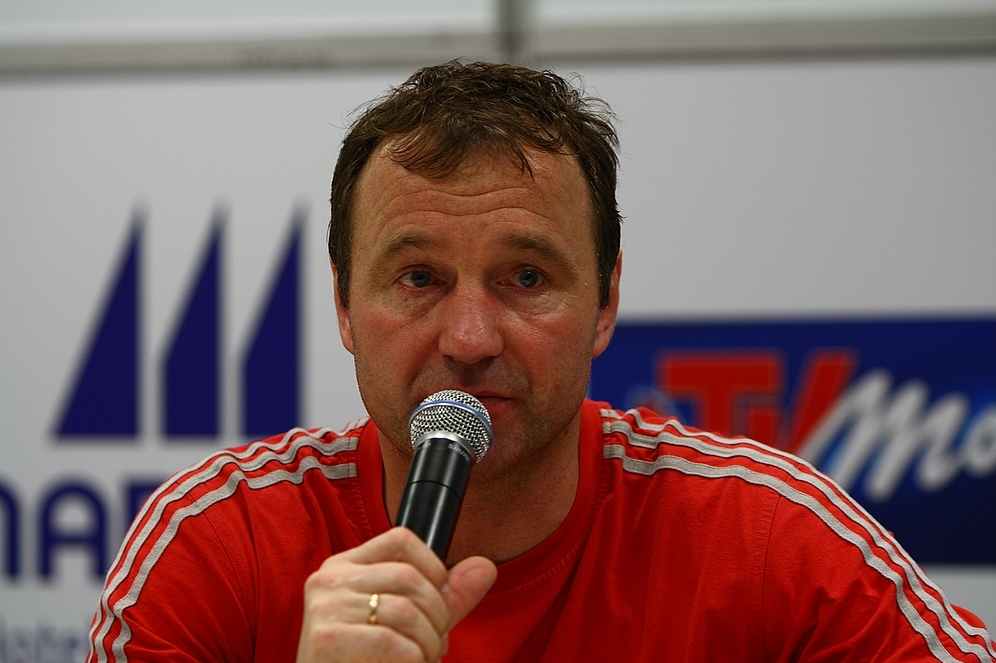
- Timm in 2008

Sport
- Sport: Boxing
Medal record
Men's amateur boxing
Representing East Germany
Friendship Games
Bronze medal – third place	1984 Havana	Light Middleweight
European Championships
Gold medal – first place	1985 Budapest	Light Middleweight

Michael Timm (13 November 1962 – 3 September 2025) was a German amateur boxer. He is best known for winning the gold medal at the 1985 European Championships in Budapest, Hungary in the Men's Light Middleweight division. Timm was born in Hagenow, Bezirk Schwerin, East Germany on 13 November 1962.

Timm died on 3 September 2025, at the age of 62.
