= Venezuela at the 1988 Summer Olympics =

- IOC code: VEN
- NOC: Venezuelan Olympic Committee

in Seoul
- Competitors: 17 (15 men, 2 women) in 7 sports
- Flag bearer: Elizabeth Popper
- Medals: Gold 0 Silver 0 Bronze 0 Total 0

Summer Olympics appearances (overview)
- 1948; 1952; 1956; 1960; 1964; 1968; 1972; 1976; 1980; 1984; 1988; 1992; 1996; 2000; 2004; 2008; 2012; 2016; 2020; 2024

Venezuela competed at the 1988 Summer Olympics in Seoul, South Korea. Seventeen competitors, fifteen men and two women, took part in fifteen events in seven sports.

== Competitors ==
The following is the list of number of competitors in the Games.

Sport	Men	Women	Total
Boxing	6	–	6
Cycling	4	0	4
Equestrian	1	0	1
Judo	2	–	2
Synchronized swimming	–	1	1
Table tennis	1	1	2
Weightlifting	1	–	1
Total	15	2	17

== Boxing ==
Men's Light Flyweight (– 48 kg)

- Marcelino Bolivar
  1. First Round – Bye
  2. Second Round – Lost to Jesus Beltre (DOM), on points (1:4)

Men's Flyweight (– 51 kg)

- David Griman
  1. First Round — Lost to Serafim Todorov (BUL), 1:4

Men's Bantamweight (– 54 kg)

- Abraham Torres
  1. First Round – Bye
  2. Second Round – Defeated Teekaram Rajcoomar (MTS), on points (5:0)
  3. Third Round — Lost to Phajol Moolsan (THA), 1:4

Men's Featherweight (– 57 kg)

- Omar Catari
  1. First Round – Bye
  2. Second Round – Defeated Moussa Kagambega (BFA), on knock-out (1st round)
  3. Third Round — Lost to Abdelhak Achik (MAR), on knock-out (1st round)

Men's Lightweight (– 60 kg)

- José Pérez
  1. First Round – Bye
  2. Second Round – Lost to Nergüin Enkhbat (MGL), on points (0:5)

Men's Welterweight (– 67 kg)

- José García
  1. First Round – Bye
  2. Second Round – Lost to Jan Dydak (POL), on points (1:4)

== Cycling ==
Four cyclists, all male, represented Venezuela in 1988.

Men's road race

- Leonardo Sierra
- Enrique Campos
- Ali Parra

Men's points race

- Alexis Méndez

== Equestrian ==
=== Jumping ===
Athlete	Horse	Event	Qualification					Final					Total	
Athlete	Horse	Event	Round 1		Round 2			Round A		Round B			Total	
Athlete	Horse	Event	Points	Rank	Points	Total	Rank	Points	Rank	Points	Total	Rank	Points	Rank
Alberto Carmona	The Dubliner	Individual	11.00	62	18.00	29.00	59	did not advance					29.00	59

== Judo ==
Athlete	Event	Final / BM	
Athlete	Event	Opposition Result	Rank
Kilmar Campos	Half Middleweight		20
Charles Griffith	Middleweight		13

== Table tennis ==
Athlete	Event	Group Round		Round of 16	Quarterfinals	Semifinals	Final / BM	
Athlete	Event	Opposition Result	Rank	Opposition Result	Opposition Result	Opposition Result	Opposition Result	Rank
Francisco López	Men's singles	Group D A Grubba (POL); L 0–3; Z Primorac (YUG); L 0-3; J Roßkopf (FRG); L 0-3; Y Miyazaki (JPN); L 0–3; A Musa (NGR); L 0-3; G Haberl (AUS); L 0-3; S Ghorpade (IND); L 2-3	8	did not advance				
Elizabeth Popper	Women's singles	Group B Yang Y (KOR); L 0–3; R Kasalová (TCH); L 0-3; Lin Li-Ju (TPE); L 0-3; Hui So Hung (HKG); L 0–3; J Al-Duqom (JOR); W 3-0	5	did not advance				

== Synchronized swimming ==
One synchronized swimmer represented Venezuela in 1988.

Women's solo

- María Elena Giusti

- Final — 13th place

== Weightlifting ==
Men

Athlete	Event	Snatch		Clean & Jerk		Total	Rank
Athlete	Event	Result	Rank	Result	Rank	Total	Rank
Humberto Fuentes	Men's 52 kg	100	11	127,5	9	227,5	10
