= Ram Bahadur Giri =

Nepalese boxer

Personal information
- Nationality: Nepalese
- Born: 1960 (age 65–66)

Sport
- Sport: Boxing

Ram Bahadur Giri (born 1960) is a Nepalese boxer. He competed in the men's bantamweight event at the 1988 Summer Olympics.
