= Philippe Desavoye =

French boxer

Personal information
- Nationality: French
- Born: 17 February 1965 (age 60); Dieppe, France

Sport
- Sport: Boxing

Philippe Desavoye (born 17 February 1965) is a French boxer. He competed in the men's flyweight event at the 1988 Summer Olympics.
