= Bishnu Bahadur Singh =

Nepalese boxer

Personal information
- Nationality: Nepalese
- Born: 1969; Nepal
- Height: 164 cm (5 ft 5 in)
- Weight: 51 kg (112 lb)

Sport
- Country: Nepal
- Sport: Boxing

Bishnu Bahadur Singh is a Nepalese Olympic boxer. He represented his country in the flyweight division at the 1988 Summer Olympics. He won his first fight against Sixto Vera, but lost his second bout against Arthur Johnson (boxer).

== 1988 Olympic results ==
Below is the record of Bishnu Bahadur Singh, a flyweight boxer who competed for Nepal at the 1988 Seoul Olympics

- Round of 64: defeated Sixto Vera (Paraguay) by decision, 5-0
- Round of 32: lost to Arthur Johnson (United States) referee stopped contest in second round
