= Alfred Kotey =

Ghanaian boxer (1968–2020)

Personal information
- Nickname: Cobra
- Nationality: Ghanaian
- Born: 3 June 1968 Accra, Ghana
- Died: 30 June 2020 (aged 52) The Bronx, New York City, US
- Height: 5 ft 5 in (165 cm)
- Weight: Flyweight; Bantamweight; Super-bantamweight; Featherweight; Super-featherweight; Lightweight

Boxing career
- Reach: 68 in (173 cm)
- Stance: Orthodox

Boxing record
- Total fights: 43
- Wins: 26
- Win by KO: 17
- Losses: 16
- Draws: 1

Alfred Kotey (3 June 1968 – 30 June 2020) was a Ghanaian professional boxer who competed from 1988 to 2012. He held the WBO bantamweight title from 1994 to 1995 and at regional level the Commonwealth flyweight title from 1989 to 1990. As an amateur he represented Ghana at the 1988 Summer Olympics.

Kotey died on 30 June 2020 in New York City where he was receiving medical treatment for a stroke and other complications.

== Amateur career ==
Kotey represented Ghana as a flyweight at the 1988 Olympic Games. His results were:

- 1st round bye
- Defeated Husain Al-Mutairi (Kuwait) RSC 1
- Defeated Benjamin Mwangata (Tanzania) 5-0
- Lost to Mario González (Mexico) 0-5

== Professional career ==
After his victory over Puerto Rico's Rafael Del Valle, he won the WBO bantamweight world title and became Ghana's fifth world champion. This was in 1994 at York Hall in London.

Sporting positions
Regional boxing titles
Vacant Title last held by Nana Konadu	West African Boxing Union flyweight champion 22 April 1989 – June 1989	Vacant Title next held by Sumaila Badu
Vacant Title last held by Nana Konadu	Commonwealth flyweight champion 21 October 1989 – 1991	Vacant Title next held by Francis Ampofo
Vacant Title last held by Naseem Hamed	WBC International super-bantamweight champion 9 December 1995 – May 1997	Vacant Title next held by Patrick Mullings
Inaugural champion	WBF Intercontinental lightweight champion 7 April 2001 – September 2001	Vacant Title next held by Guillaume Salingue
World boxing titles
Preceded by Rafael del Valle	WBO bantamweight champion 30 July 1994 - 21 October 1995	Succeeded by Daniel Jimenez
