= Sambuugiin Oyuuntsetseg =

Mongolian archer (born 1964)

Personal information
- Nationality: Mongolian
- Born: 15 December 1964 (age 61)

Sport
- Sport: Archery

Sambuugiin Oyuuntsetseg (born 15 December 1964) is a Mongolian archer. She competed in the women's individual and team events at the 1988 Summer Olympics.
