= Lennox Lewis vs. Michael Grant =

Boxing match

Two Big
- Date: April 29, 2000
- Venue: Madison Square Garden, New York, New York, US
- Title(s) on the line: WBC, IBF, and IBO heavyweight titles

Tale of the tape
Boxer	Lennox Lewis	Michael Grant
Nickname	The Lion	Big
Hometown	London, England	Chicago, Illinois, U.S.
Purse	$7,500,000	$2,500,000
Pre-fight record	35–1–1 (27 KO)	31–0 (22 KO)
Age	34 years, 7 months	27 years, 8 months
Height	6 ft 5 in (196 cm)	6 ft 7 in (201 cm)
Weight	247 lb (112 kg)	250 lb (113 kg)
Style	Orthodox	Orthodox
Recognition	WBC, IBF, and IBO; Heavyweight Champion	WBC and IBF; No. 2 Ranked Heavyweight

Result
- Lewis wins via second-round knockout

Lennox Lewis vs. Michael Grant, billed as Two Big, was a professional boxing match contested on April 29, 2000 for the WBC, IBF, and IBO heavyweight championships.

== Background ==
In his previous fight, Lennox Lewis had finally captured the undisputed heavyweight championship, unifying the three major heavyweight titles (and retaining the lightly regarded IBO belt) after defeating Evander Holyfield by unanimous decision. The contract Lewis signed prior to his fight with Holyfield stated that Lewis' first defense of his newly won championship would have to come against the WBA's number one contender, who at the time was Lewis' previous adversary Henry Akinwande but because of illness was later changed to John Ruiz. However, Lewis refused to face Ruiz and instead agreed to match with undefeated prospect Michael Grant. Initially, the WBA voted in favor of Lewis keeping his WBA title on the condition that he face Ruiz as soon as possible should he defeat Grant, but a federal judge overturned the decision and ordered that Lewis be stripped of his WBA championship.

On the undercard highly regarded contender Wladimir Klitschko stopped David Bostice in the 2nd round.

== The fight ==
Grant started the fight aggressively, but things quickly went downhill for the challenger. Just past the midway point of the first round, Lewis was able to land a strong right hand to the top of Grant's head that sent Grant down. Grant was able to get back up at the count of eight, but was clearly hurt from the blow and quickly found himself in more trouble as Lewis continued his aggressive assault. As the second minute came to an end, Lewis landed three consecutive punches to the lower head and neck, and sent Grant staggering into the corner where the ropes prevented him falling to ground, though referee Arthur Mercante Jr. still counted it as the knockdown. With Grant now on wobbly legs, Lewis continued to land power punches and with 13 seconds left in the round hit Grant with a left–right combination that sent Grant to the canvas for the third time in the round. Though Lewis had seemingly done enough to score the knockout victory, Grant just managed to get back up as the round ended. Lewis started the second round aggressively in an attempt to quickly obtain the knockout victory over the exhausted Grant, but after being unable to do so in the first minute of the round, took a more conservative approach. With 23 seconds left in the round, Lewis was finally able to end the fight after landing a right uppercut. Grant attempted to get back up, but failed to make the referee's count, giving Lewis the knockout victory at 2:53 of the second round.

== Aftermath ==
Lewis agreed to make his next defense against Francois Botha in his native London, making it his first championship fight in Britain since being defeated by Oliver McCall in 1994.

In his very next bout, Grant would be dropped by his opponent's first punch and suffer a TKO in the first round while breaking his ankle against Jameel McCline. Grant would never again challenge for the title of a major sanctioning body.

== Undercard ==
Confirmed bouts:

== Broadcasting ==
Country	Broadcaster
Australia	Main Event
United Kingdom	Sky Sports
United States	HBO

Preceded by vs. Evander Holyfield II	Lennox Lewis' bouts 29 April 2000	Succeeded by vs. Francois Botha
Preceded by vs. Andrew Golota	Michael Grant's bouts 29 April 2000	Succeeded by vs. Jameel McCline
