= Benaissa Abed =

Algerian boxer (born 1964)

Personal information
- Nationality: Algerian
- Born: 3 October 1964 (age 60)
- Height: 1.70 m (5 ft 7 in)
- Weight: 51 kg (112 lb)

Sport
- Sport: Boxing

Benaissa Abed (born 3 October 1964) is an Algerian boxer. He competed in the 1988 Summer Olympics, reaching the quarter finals of the flyweight category before losing to Andreas Tews of East Germany.
