= Meluin de Leon =

Dominican boxer (born 1968)

Personal information
- Nationality: Dominican
- Born: 26 December 1968 (age 56)

Sport
- Sport: Boxing

Meluin de Leon (born 26 December 1968) is a Dominican Republic boxer. He competed in the men's flyweight event at the 1988 Summer Olympics.
