= Marcus Priaulx =

Australian boxer

Personal information
- Nationality: Australian
- Born: 26 September 1967 (age 59)

Sport
- Sport: Boxing

Marcus Priaulx (born 26 September 1967) is an Australian boxer. He competed in the men's bantamweight event at the 1988 Summer Olympics. At the 1988 Summer Olympics, he lost to Phajol Moolsan of Thailand.
