= Simon Morales =

Colombian boxer (born 1964)

Personal information
- Nationality: Colombian
- Born: 14 April 1964 (age 62)

Sport
- Sport: Boxing

Simon Morales (born 14 April 1964) is a Colombian boxer. He competed in the men's flyweight event at the 1988 Summer Olympics. At the 1988 Summer Olympics, he lost to Setsuo Segawa of Japan.
