= Felipe Nieves =

Puerto Rican boxer (born 1969)

Personal information
- Nationality: Puerto Rican
- Born: 15 September 1969 (age 57) Bayamón, Puerto Rico

Sport
- Sport: Boxing

Felipe Nieves (born 15 September 1969) is a Puerto Rican boxer. He competed in the men's bantamweight event at the 1988 Summer Olympics.
