= Grzegorz Jabłoński =

Polish boxer (born 1966)

Personal information
- Nationality: Polish
- Born: 10 March 1966 (age 60) Prostki, Poland

Sport
- Sport: Boxing

Grzegorz Jabłoński (born 10 March 1966) is a Polish boxer. He competed in the men's bantamweight event at the 1988 Summer Olympics. He lost his first bout to Nyamaagiin Altankhuyag of Mongolia.
