= Jimmy Mayanja =

Swedish boxer

Personal information
- Nationality: Swedish
- Born: 29 December 1958 (age 66); Jinja, Uganda

Sport
- Sport: Boxing

Jimmy Mayanja (born 29 December 1958) is a Swedish boxer. He competed in the men's bantamweight event at the 1988 Summer Olympics.
