= Manoj Pingale =

Indian boxer

Personal information
- Full name: Manoj Dattatray Pingale
- Nationality: Indian
- Born: 22 October 1967 (age 57)

Sport
- Sport: Boxing

Manoj Pingale (born 22 October 1967) is an Indian boxer. He competed in the men's flyweight event at the 1988 Summer Olympics.
