= Bonifacio García =

Spanish boxer (born 1969)

Personal information
- Full name: Bonifacio García Ochaita
- Nationality: Spanish
- Born: 3 March 1969 (age 56); Vallecas, Spain

Sport
- Sport: Boxing

Bonifacio García Ochaita (born 3 March 1969) is a Spanish former professional boxer. As an amateur, he competed in the men's flyweight event at the 1988 Summer Olympics.
