= Joe Lawlor =

Irish boxer (born 1966)

Personal information
- Nationality: Irish
- Born: 5 October 1966 (age 58)

Sport
- Sport: Boxing

Joe Lawlor (born 5 October 1966) is an Irish boxer. He competed in the men's flyweight event at the 1988 Summer Olympics.
