= Tseyen-Oidovyn Tserennyam =

Mongolian boxer (born 1968)

Tseyen-Oidovyn Tserennyam (born November 27, 1968) is a boxer from Mongolia, who competed in the flyweight (– 51 kg) division at the 1988 Summer Olympics, losing his opening bout to Kim Kwang-sun of South Korea. He won a bronze medal in the bantamweight category at the 1990 Asian Games in Beijing.
