= Teekaram Rajcoomar =

Mauritian boxer (born 1964)

Personal information
- Nationality: Mauritian
- Born: 13 March 1964 (age 62)

Sport
- Sport: Boxing

Teekaram Rajcoomar (born 13 March 1964) is a Mauritian boxer. He competed in the men's bantamweight event at the 1988 Summer Olympics.
