= Joilson Santana =

Brazilian boxer

Personal information
- Nationality: Brazilian
- Born: 3 January 1964 (age 62)

Sport
- Sport: Boxing

Joilson Santana (born 3 January 1964) is a Brazilian boxer. He competed in the men's bantamweight event at the 1988 Summer Olympics.
