= Katsuyuki Matsushima =

Japanese boxer

Personal information
- Full name: 松島 勝之 Matsushima Katsuyuki
- Nationality: Japanese
- Born: 11 October 1966 (age 60)

Sport
- Sport: Boxing

Katsuyuki Matsushima (born 11 October 1966) is a Japanese boxer. He competed in the men's bantamweight event at the 1988 Summer Olympics.
