= Aleksandr Artemyev (boxer) =

Russian boxer

Personal information
- Nationality: Russian
- Born: 5 September 1966 (age 60) Leningrad, Russian SFSR, Soviet Union

Sport
- Sport: Boxing

Aleksandr Artemyev (born 5 September 1966) is a Russian former boxer. He competed in the men's bantamweight event at the 1988 Summer Olympics.
