= Gamal El-Din El-Koumy =

Egyptian boxer (born 1958)

Personal information
- Nationality: Egyptian
- Born: 28 August 1958 (age 66)

Sport
- Sport: Boxing

Gamal El-Din El-Koumy (born 28 August 1958) is an Egyptian boxer. He competed at the 1984 Summer Olympics and the 1988 Summer Olympics.
