= Stephen Mwema =

Kenyan boxer

Personal information
- Born: August 8, 1963
- Died: November 24, 2004 (aged 41)
Medal record
Men's Boxing
Representing Kenya
All-Africa Games
Gold medal – first place	1987 Nairobi	Bantamweight

Stephen Mwema (born August 8, 1963 and died in November 2004) was a bantamweight Kenyan boxer. As an amateur boxer Mwema represented Kenya at the 1988 Summer Olympics in Seoul. He defeated Rambahadur Giri from Nepal and Alberto Machaze from Mozambique, but lost in the quarterfinals to Kennedy McKinney from the United States. Mwema won a gold medal at the 1987 All-Africa Games in Nairobi.

== Olympic results ==
- 1st round bye
- Defeated Rambahadur Giri (Nepal) RSCH 2
- Defeated Alberto Machaze (Mozambique) 5:0
- Lost to Kennedy McKinney (United States) 0:5

During his professional boxing career he had 15 wins, 5 losses and one draw.

He was diagnosed with pneumonia in November 2004 and died after a short stay in the Hospital. He's succeeded by four children.
