= Nyamaagiin Altankhuyag =

Mongolian boxer (born 1970)

Nyamaagiin Altankhuyag (born September 27, 1970) is a boxer from Mongolia, who competed in the bantamweight (– 54 kg) division at the 1988 Summer Olympics and the light-welterweight (– 63.5 kg) category at the 1992 Summer Olympics. He won a bronze medal in the light-welterweight category at the 1990 Asian Games in Beijing.

== Olympic results ==
Represented Mongolia as a Bantamweight at the 1988 Olympic Games.

- 1st round bye
- Defeated Grzegorz Jabłoński (Poland) 3-2
- Defeated John Lowey (Ireland) 3-2
- Lost to Phajol Moolsan (Thailand) 0-5

Represented Mongolia as a Light Welterweight at the 1992 Olympic Games.

- Defeated Khamsavath Vilayphone (Laos) RSC-2
- Lost to Peter Richardson (Great Britain) 4-21
