= Mohammed Sabo (boxer) =

Nigerian boxer

Personal information
- Born: 1 October 1967 (age 58)
Medal record
Men's Boxing
Representing Nigeria
Commonwealth Games
Gold medal – first place	1990 Auckland	Bantamweight

Mohammed Sabo (born 1 October 1967) is a Nigerian former amateur boxer. He won a gold medal at the 1990 Commonwealth Games and competed at the 1988 Summer Olympics in Seoul and the 1992 Summer Olympics in Barcelona, where he reached the quarter final.
