= Kim Kwang-sun =

South Korean boxer (born 1964)

Personal information
- Born: June 8, 1964 (age 62) Jeollabuk-do, South Korea
- Height: 165 cm (5 ft 5 in)
- Weight: 51 kg (112 lb)

Boxing career
- Weight class: Flyweight
Medal record
Men's boxing
Representing South Korea
Olympic Games
Gold medal – first place	1988 Seoul	Flyweight
Asian Games
Gold medal – first place	1986 Seoul	Flyweight
Asian Championships
Gold medal – first place	1987 Kuwait City	Flyweight
World Cup
Gold medal – first place	1983 Rome	Light flyweight
Bronze medal – third place	1985 Seoul	Flyweight
Gold medal – first place	1987 Belgrade	Flyweight

- Kim Kwang-sun
- Hangul: 김광선
- Hanja: 金光善
- RR: Gim Gwangseon
- MR: Kim Kwangsŏn

Kim Kwang-sun (Korean: 김광선, born June 8, 1964) is a retired South Korean boxer.

== Amateur career ==
Kim won the gold medal in the Men's Flyweight (51 kg) category at the 1988 Summer Olympics in Seoul. He was a two-time Boxing World Cup champion as well.

=== Results ===
1984 Summer Olympics
Event	Round	Result	Opponent	Score
Light Flyweight	First	Loss	(United States) Paul Gonzales	0-5

1988 Summer Olympics
Event	Round	Result	Opponent	Score
Flyweight	First	Win	(Mongolia) Tseyen-Oidovyn Tserennyam	RSC 2
Flyweight	Second	Win	(Zimbabwe) Nokuthula Tshabangu	RSC 2
Flyweight	Third	Win	(United States) Arthur Johnson	5-0
Flyweight	Quarterfinal	Win	(Bulgaria) Serafim Todorov	4-1
Flyweight	Semifinal	Win	(Soviet Union) Timofey Skryabin	5-0
Flyweight	Final	Win	(East Germany) Andreas Tews	4-1

== Pro career ==
Kim turned pro in 1990 and after only five fights took on Humberto González in 1992 for the WBC Light Flyweight title. Although he was leading in the fight, he lost in a 12th-round TKO. In 1993 he took on Michael Carbajal for the WBC and IBF Light Flyweight title but was TKO'd in the 7th round. He retired after the bout with a record of 6-2-0. American television commentators said they thought Kim was winning the Carbajal bout.
