= Andy Agosto =

Puerto Rican boxer

Personal information
- Nationality: Puerto Rican
- Born: 11 September 1970 (age 55) Carolina, Puerto Rico
- Weight: Super flyweight

Boxing career
- Stance: Southpaw

Boxing record
- Total fights: 18
- Wins: 15
- Win by KO: 7
- Losses: 3

Andrew Agosto (born 11 September 1970) is a Puerto Rican boxer.

== Amateur career ==
He competed in the 1988 Summer Olympics.

== Professional boxing record ==
On 13 December 1997, Agosto fought Johnny Tapia for the future International Boxing Hall of Famer's International Boxing Federation and World Boxing Organization's world Junior Bantamweight championship belts at Pompano Beach, Florida. Agosto lost by a wide unanimous decision.

18 fights	15 wins	3 losses
By knockout	7	2
By decision	8	1
