= Arthur Johnson (boxer) =

American boxer

Arthur Anthony Johnson (born February 16, 1966, in East Saint Louis Illinois) is a former professional boxer from the United States, nicknamed "Flash".

== Amateur career ==
1984 Light Flyweight Champion for the Western Olympic Trials 1984 Light Flyweight Junior Nationals Champion

1985 Light Flyweight National Sports Festival Qualifying Champion 1985 Light Flyweight National Sports Festival Champion, in Baton Rouge, LA 1985 Light Flyweight National Golden Gloves Champion 1985 Flyweight Amateur Boxing Federation Champion

1986 Flyweight Amateur Boxing Federation Champion 1986 Flyweight World Champion Box-off 1986 Inaugural Goodwill Games Gold Medalist (an International Championship)

1987 Flyweight Amateur Boxing Federation Champion 1987 Flyweight Pan-American Box-off Champion

1988 Flyweight Olympic Trials Champion, in Concord, CA 1988 Flyweight Olympic Trials Box-off Champion, in Las Vegas, NV 1988 Flyweight Olympic Boxing Team (advancing to the Round of 16)

Johnson also held 7 Golden Glove titles in the light flyweight and flyweight division as an open fighter. He competed as a Flyweight for the United States at the 1988 Seoul Olympic Games.

=== 1988 Olympic Results ===
- Round of 64: Defeated Andrea Mannai (Italy) by decision, 5-0
- Round of 32: Defeated Bishnu Bahadur Singh (Nepal) referee stopped contest in the second round
- Round of 16 Lost to Kwang-Sun Kim (South Korea) by decision, 0-5 controversial decision in hometown of Korean fighter.

== Professional career ==
Johnson began his career in 1992 and in 1994 challenged Pichit Sitbangprachan for the IBF flyweight title in only his 9th pro fight, but lost a controversial decision. In 1995 he took on WBO super flyweight title holder Johnny Tapia, but lost a majority decision. In 1998 he fought Mark Johnson for the IBF flyweight title, but was knocked out in the 1st round, his first and only knockout loss. In 2000, he lost in his 4th opportunity for a title against IBF bantamweight title holder Tim Austin, by decision. He won the flyweight North American title and National Boxing Association bantamweight and Jr. featherweight world titles as well as the International intercontinental title. He retired in 2003 having won 22 and lost 6 with 14 knockout wins and 1 knockout loss.
