= René Breitbarth =

German boxer

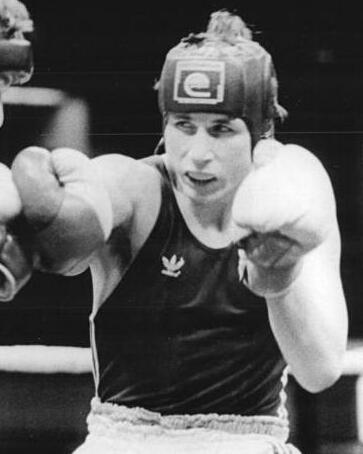
- Breitbarth in 1986

Personal information
- Born: 24 April 1966 (age 60) Mühlhausen, East Germany
Medal record
Men's boxing
Representing East Germany
Men's Boxing
World Amateur Championships
| Silver medal – second place | 1986 Reno | Bantamweight |
European Amateur Championships
| Gold medal – first place | 1985 Budapest | Light Flyweight |
| Bronze medal – third place | 1987 Turin | Bantamweight |

Rene Breitbarth (born 24 April 1966 in Mühlhausen) is a former boxer from East Germany who won a Light Flyweight gold medal at the 1985 European Amateur Championships. In 1986, he won the bantamweight silver medal at the 1986 World Amateur Boxing Championships in Reno. At the 1988 Summer Olympics, he was defeated by Jorge Eliécer Julio of Colombia in the round of 16 of the bantamweight category.
