= Abraham Torres =

Venezuelan boxer

Abraham Torres (born January 16, 1968, in Turmero, Aragua) is a former Venezuelan boxer, who was nicknamed "Habran". At the 1988 Summer Olympics, he lost in the third round of the men's bantamweight division (52–54 kg) to Thailand's eventual bronze medalist, Phajol Moolsan.
