= Phajol Moolsan =

Thai boxer (born 1968)

Personal information
- Full name: ผจญ มูลสัน
- Nationality: Thailand
- Born: September 13, 1968 (age 57) Banphot Phisai, Nakhon Sawan
- Weight: 51 kg (112 lb)

Sport
- Sport: Boxing
- Weight class: Bantamweight
- Club: Osotsapa
Medal record
Olympic Games
Bronze medal – third place	1988 Seoul	Bantamweight

Phajol Moolsan (Thai: ผจญ มูลสัน; RTGS: Phachon Munsan; born September 13, 1968) is a Thai boxer. At the 1988 Summer Olympics he won a bronze medal in the men's Bantamweight category, together with Jorge Julio Rocha of Colombia. Even though he was not a hopeful athlete for the Thailand national team, the hopeful boxer was Chatchai Sasakul in the men's Mini-flyweight category, which was eliminated earlier.

In Muay thai his name was Put Keitlansang. (Thai: พุฒ เกียรติลานสาง)

== Olympic results ==
- 1st round bye
- Defeated Marcus Priaulx (Australia) 5–0
- Defeated Abraham Torres (Venezuela) 3–2
- Defeated Nyamaagiin Altankhuyag (Mongolia) 5–0
- Lost to Kennedy McKinney (United States) RSC 1

== Muay Thai record ==
Muay Thai Record
Date	Result	Opponent	Event	Location	Method	Round	Time
1987-11-06	Loss	(Thailand) Klaichid Piyapan	Lumpinee Stadium	Bangkok, Thailand	Decision	5	3:00
1987-08-05	Win	(Thailand) Maewpa Fairtex	Rajadamnern Stadium	Bangkok, Thailand	Decision	5	3:00
1987-07-20	Loss	(Thailand) Chakphet Sanphawut	Rajadamnern Stadium	Bangkok, Thailand	Decision	5	3:00
1987-06-16	Loss	(Thailand) Kaichon Devy	Huamark Stadium	Bangkok, Thailand	Decision	5	3:00
1987-01-01	Win	(Thailand) Thanuchai Sitnopchai	Rajadamnern Stadium	Bangkok, Thailand	Decision	5	3:00
1986-08-18	Loss	(Thailand) Thanuchai Jiraprasit	Rajadamnern Stadium	Bangkok, Thailand	Decision	5	3:00
1986-02-16	Loss	(Thailand) Chakphet Sanphawut	Rajadamnern Stadium	Bangkok, Thailand	Decision	5	3:00
Legend: Win Loss Draw/No contest Notes
