= Boxing at the 1988 Summer Olympics =

Boxing at the Games of the XXIV Olympiad
- Venue: Jamsil Students' Gymnasium
- Dates: 17 September-2 October 1988
- Competitors: 432 from 106 nations

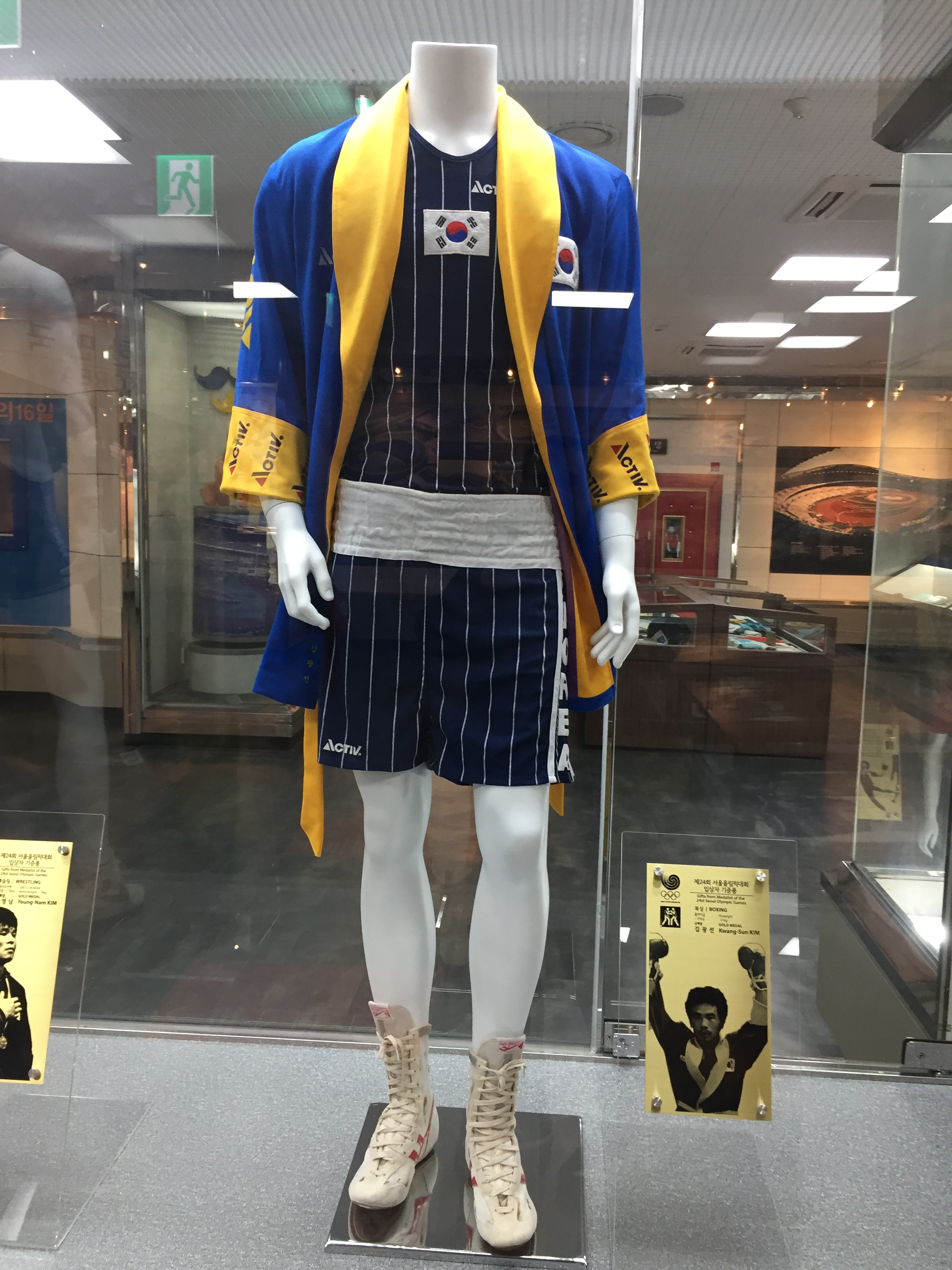
Korean boxers' uniforms at the games

Boxing at the 1988 Summer Olympics took place in the Jamsil Students' Gymnasium in Seoul between 17 September and 2 October. Twelve men's individual boxing events were contested, attended by 432 athletes and 159 officials from 106 countries. The events were notable for a controversial decision in the light middleweight championship bout between American Roy Jones Jr. and South Korean Park Si-Hun, when Roy Jones was denied gold despite being considered vastly superior by observers.

== Medalists ==
Games	Gold	Silver	Bronze
Light flyweight (– 48 kg)	Ivailo Marinov; Bulgaria	Michael Carbajal; United States	Leopoldo Serantes; Philippines
Light flyweight (– 48 kg)	Ivailo Marinov; Bulgaria	Michael Carbajal; United States	Róbert Isaszegi; Hungary
Flyweight (– 51 kg)	Kim Kwang-sun; South Korea	Andreas Tews; East Germany	Mario González; Mexico
Flyweight (– 51 kg)	Kim Kwang-sun; South Korea	Andreas Tews; East Germany	Timofey Skryabin; Soviet Union
Bantamweight (– 54 kg)	Kennedy McKinney; United States	Aleksandar Khristov; Bulgaria	Jorge Eliécer Julio; Colombia
Bantamweight (– 54 kg)	Kennedy McKinney; United States	Aleksandar Khristov; Bulgaria	Phajol Moolsan; Thailand
Featherweight (– 57 kg)	Giovanni Parisi; Italy	Daniel Dumitrescu; Romania	Lee Jae-hyuk; South Korea
Featherweight (– 57 kg)	Giovanni Parisi; Italy	Daniel Dumitrescu; Romania	Abdelhak Achik; Morocco
Lightweight (– 60 kg)	Andreas Zülow; East Germany	George Cramne; Sweden	Nergüin Enkhbat; Mongolia
Lightweight (– 60 kg)	Andreas Zülow; East Germany	George Cramne; Sweden	Romallis Ellis; United States
Light welterweight (– 63.5 kg)	Vyacheslav Yanovski; Soviet Union	Grahame Cheney; Australia	Lars Myrberg; Sweden
Light welterweight (– 63.5 kg)	Vyacheslav Yanovski; Soviet Union	Grahame Cheney; Australia	Reiner Gies; West Germany
Welterweight (– 67 kg)	Robert Wangila; Kenya	Laurent Boudouani; France	Jan Dydak; Poland
Welterweight (– 67 kg)	Robert Wangila; Kenya	Laurent Boudouani; France	Kenneth Gould; United States
Light middleweight (– 71 kg)	Park Si-hun; South Korea	Roy Jones Jr. United States	Raymond Downey; Canada
Light middleweight (– 71 kg)	Park Si-hun; South Korea	Roy Jones Jr. United States	Richard Woodhall; Great Britain
Middleweight (– 75 kg)	Henry Maske; East Germany	Egerton Marcus; Canada	Chris Sande; Kenya
Middleweight (– 75 kg)	Henry Maske; East Germany	Egerton Marcus; Canada	Hussain Shah; Pakistan
Light heavyweight (– 81 kg)	Andrew Maynard; United States	Nurmagomed Shanavazov; Soviet Union	Damir Škaro; Yugoslavia
Light heavyweight (– 81 kg)	Andrew Maynard; United States	Nurmagomed Shanavazov; Soviet Union	Henryk Petrich; Poland
Heavyweight (– 91 kg)	Ray Mercer; United States	Baik Hyun-man; South Korea	Andrzej Golota; Poland
Heavyweight (– 91 kg)	Ray Mercer; United States	Baik Hyun-man; South Korea	Arnold Vanderlyde; Netherlands
Super heavyweight (+ 91 kg)	Lennox Lewis; Canada	Riddick Bowe; United States	Aleksandr Miroshnichenko; Soviet Union
Super heavyweight (+ 91 kg)	Lennox Lewis; Canada	Riddick Bowe; United States	Janusz Zarenkiewicz; Poland

== Medal table ==
Rank	Nation	Gold	Silver	Bronze	Total
1	United States	3	3	2	8
2	South Korea	2	1	1	4
3	East Germany	2	1	0	3
4	Soviet Union	1	1	2	4
5	Canada	1	1	1	3
6	Bulgaria	1	1	0	2
7	Kenya	1	0	1	2
8	Italy	1	0	0	1
9	Sweden	0	1	1	2
10	Australia	0	1	0	1
10	France	0	1	0	1
10	Romania	0	1	0	1
13	Poland	0	0	4	4
14	Colombia	0	0	1	1
14	Great Britain	0	0	1	1
14	Hungary	0	0	1	1
14	Mexico	0	0	1	1
14	Mongolia	0	0	1	1
14	Morocco	0	0	1	1
14	Netherlands	0	0	1	1
14	Pakistan	0	0	1	1
14	Philippines	0	0	1	1
14	Thailand	0	0	1	1
14	West Germany	0	0	1	1
14	Yugoslavia	0	0	1	1
Totals (25 entries)		12	12	24	48
