= Boxing at the 1988 Summer Olympics – Light flyweight =

Olympic boxing tournament

Light flyweight boxing at the Games of the XXIV Olympiad
- Venue: Jamsil Students' Gymnasium
- Dates: 17 September – 1 October 1988
- Competitors: 34 from 34 nations

Medalists
1st place, gold medalist(s)		Ivailo Marinov	Bulgaria
2nd place, silver medalist(s)		Michael Carbajal	United States
3rd place, bronze medalist(s)		Leopoldo Serantes	Philippines
3rd place, bronze medalist(s)		Róbert Isaszegi	Hungary

The men's light flyweight event was part of the boxing programme at the 1988 Summer Olympics. The weight class was the lightest contested, and allowed boxers of up to 48 kilograms to compete. The competition was held from 17 September to 1 October 1988. 34 boxers from 34 nations competed. 1980 bronze medalist Ivailo Marinov won the gold medal by controversially defeating young Michael Carbajal. There were suspicions of politics influencing the judges decision in the gold medal bout.

== Medalists ==
Gold	Ivailo Marinov; Bulgaria
Silver	Michael Carbajal; United States
Bronze	Leopoldo Serantes; Philippines
Bronze	Róbert Isaszegi; Hungary

== Results ==
The following boxers took part in the event:

Rank	Name	Country
1	Ivailo Marinov	Bulgaria
2	Michael Carbajal	United States
3T	Leopoldo Serantes	Philippines
3T	Róbert Isaszegi	Hungary
5T	Scotty Olson	Canada
5T	Chatchai Sasakul	Thailand
5T	Mahjoub M'jirih	Morocco
5T	Aleksandr Makhmutov	Soviet Union
9T	Ðặng Hiếu Hiền	Vietnam
9T	Wayne McCullough	Ireland
9T	Maurice Maina	Kenya
9T	Sadoon Mohamed Aboub	Iraq
9T	Sammy Stewart	Liberia
9T	Tom Chisenga	Zambia
9T	Jesús Beltre	Dominican Republic
9T	Donald Martínez	El Salvador
17T	O Gwang-su	South Korea
17T	Antonio Caballero	Spain
17T	Fred Muteweta	Uganda
17T	Washington Banian	Papua New Guinea
17T	Luis Rolón	Puerto Rico
17T	Mohamed Haddad	Syria
17T	Colin Moore	Guyana
17T	Bounmy Thephavong	Laos
17T	Moustafa Esmail	Egypt
17T	Darwin Angeles	Honduras
17T	Liu Hsin-hung	Chinese Taipei
17T	Ochiryn Demberel	Mongolia
17T	Marcelino Bolívar	Venezuela
17T	Carlos Eluaiza	Argentina
17T	Mark Epton	Great Britain
32T	Damber Dutta Bhatta	Nepal
32T	Yacine Sheikh	Algeria
32T	Mamoru Kuroiwa	Japan

=== First round ===
- Mark Epton (GBR) def. Damber Dutta Bhatta (NEP), 5:0
- Henry Martínez (ELS) def. Yacine Sheikh (ALG), 5:0
- Ochiryn Demberel (MGL) def. Mamoru Kuroiwa (JPN), KO-3

=== Second round ===
- Michael Carbajal (USA) def. Oh Kwang Soo (KOR), 3:2
- Dang Nieu Hu (VIE) def. Antonio Caballero (ESP), Referee stopped contest (RSC)-2
- Wayne McCullough (IRL) def. Fred Mutuweta (UGA), 5:0
- Scotty Olson (CAN) def. Washington Banian (PNG), KO-1
- Chatchai Sasakul (THA) def. Luis Román Rolón (PUR), 3:2
- Maurice Maina (KEN) def. Mohamed Haddad (SYR), 4:1
- Róbert Isaszegi (HUN) def. Colin Moore (GUY), 5:0
- Sadoon Abboud (IRQ) def. Bounmy Thephavong (LAO), RSC-2
- Leopoldo Serrantes (PHI) def. Hassan Mustafa (EGY), RSC-2
- Sam Stewart (LBR) def. Darwin Angeles (HON), 5:0
- Thomas Chisenga (ZAM) def. Liu Hsin-Hung (TPE), 4:1
- Mahjoub Mjirich (MAR) def. Ochiryn Demberel (MGL), 3:2
- Jesus Beltre (DOM) def. Marcelino Bolivar (VEN), 4:1
- Alexander Makhmutov (URS) def. Carlos Eluaiza (ARG), 5:0
- Ivailo Marinov (BUL) def. Mark Epton (GBR), 5:0
- Henry Martínez (ELS) def. Yehuda Ben-Haim (ISR), walk-over

=== Third round ===
- Michael Carbajal (USA) def. Dang Nieu Hu (VIE), RSC-1
- Scotty Olson (CAN) def. Wayne McCullough (IRL), 5:0
- Chatchai Sasakul (THA) def. Maurice Maina (KEN), 5:0
- Róbert Isaszegi (HUN) def. Sadoon Abboud (IRQ), RSC-1
- Leopoldo Serrantes (PHI) def. Sam Stewart (LBR), 5:0
- Mahjoub Mjirich (MAR) def. Thomas Chisenga (ZAM), 5:0
- Alexander Makhmutov (URS) def. Jesus Beltre (DOM), 4:1
- Ivailo Marinov (BUL) def. Henry Martínez (ELS), 5:0

=== Quarterfinals ===
- Michael Carbajal (USA) def. Scotty Olson (CAN), 5:0
- Róbert Isaszegi (HUN) def. Chatchai Sasakul (THA), 3:2
- Leopoldo Serrantes (PHI) def. Mahjoub Mjirich (MAR), RSC-3
- Ivailo Marinov (BUL) def. Alexander Makhmutov (URS), 5:0

=== Semifinals ===
- Michael Carbajal (USA) def. Róbert Isaszegi (HUN), 4:1
- Ivailo Marinov (BUL) def. Leopoldo Serrantes (PHI), 5:0

=== Final ===
- Ivailo Marinov (BUL) def. Michael Carbajal (USA), 5:0
