= Boxing at the 1984 Summer Olympics – Light flyweight =

Olympic boxing tournament

Light flyweight boxing at the Games of the XXIII Olympiad
- Venue: Los Angeles Memorial Sports Arena
- Dates: 30 July – 11 August 1984
- Competitors: 24 from 24 nations

Medalists
1st place, gold medalist(s)		Paul Gonzales	United States
2nd place, silver medalist(s)		Salvatore Todisco	Italy
3rd place, bronze medalist(s)		Marcelino Bolivar	Venezuela
3rd place, bronze medalist(s)		Keith Mwila	Zambia

The men's light flyweight event was part of the boxing programme at the 1984 Summer Olympics. The weight class was the lightest contested, and allowed boxers of up to 48 kilograms to compete. The competition was held from 30 July to 11 August 1984. 24 boxers from 24 nations competed.

== Medalists ==
Gold	Paul Gonzales; United States
Silver	Salvatore Todisco; Italy
Bronze	Marcelino Bolivar; Venezuela
Bronze	Keith Mwila; Zambia

== Results ==
The following boxers took part in the event:

Rank	Name	Country
1	Paul Gonzales	United States
2	Salvatore Todisco	Italy
3T	Marcelino Bolivar	Venezuela
3T	Keith Mwila	Zambia
5T	Mamoru Kuroiwa	Japan
5T	Rafael Ramos	Puerto Rico
5T	Carlos Motta	Guatemala
5T	John Lyon	Great Britain
9T	Francis Tejedor	Colombia
9T	Chung Pao-ming	Chinese Taipei
9T	Gerry Hawkins	Ireland
9T	Jesús Beltre	Dominican Republic
9T	Agapito Gómez	Spain
9T	Daniel Mwangi	Kenya
9T	Yehuda Ben Haim	Israel
9T	William Bagonza	Uganda
17T	Mahjoub M'jirih	Morocco
17T	Nelson Jamili	Philippines
17T	Mustafa Genç	Turkey
17T	Sanpol Sang-Ano	Thailand
17T	Michael Ebo Dankwa	Ghana
17T	Alego Akomi	Sudan
17T	Abbas Zeghayer	Iraq
17T	Kim Gwang-seon	South Korea

=== First round ===
- Rafael Ramos (PUR) def. Carlos Salazar (ARG), walk-over
- Agapito Gómez (ESP) def. Mahjoub Mjirich (MAR), 3:2
- Marcelino Bolivar (VEN) def. Nelson Jamili (PHI), 5:0
- Carlos Motta (GUA) def. Mustafa Genç (TUR), 5:0
- Daniel Mwangi (KEN) def. Sanpol Sang-Ano (THA), RSC-3
- Yehuda Ben-Haim (ISR) def. Michael Ebo Dankwa (GHA), 4:1
- John Lyon (GBR) def. Alego Akomi (SUD), 5:0
- William Bagonza (UGA) def. Abbas Zeghayer (IRQ), RSC-2
- Paul Gonzales (USA) def. Kim Kwang-Sun (KOR), 5:0

=== Second round ===
- Mamoru Kuroiwa (JPN) def. Francisco Tejedor (COL), 4:1
- Keith Mwila (ZAM) def. Chung Pao Ming (TPE), RSC-2
- Salvatore Todisco (ITA) def. Gerard Hawkins (IRL), 5:0
- Rafael Ramos (PUR) def. Jesús Beltre (DOM), 4:1
- Marcelino Bolivar (VEN) def. Agapito Gómez (ESP), 4:1
- Carlos Motta (GUA) def. Daniel Mwangi (KEN), 4:1
- John Lyon (GBR) def. Yehuda Ben-Haim (ISR), 5:0
- Paul Gonzales (USA) def. William Bagonza (UGA), 5:0

=== Quarterfinals ===
- Keith Mwila (ZAM) def. Mamoru Kuroiwa (JPN), 5:0
- Salvatore Todisco (ITA) def. Rafael Ramos (PUR), 4:1
- Marcelino Bolivar (VEN) def. Carlos Motta (GUA), 5:0
- Paul Gonzales (USA) def. John Lyon (GBR), 4:1

=== Semifinals ===
- Salvatore Todisco (ITA) def. Keith Mwila (ZAM), 5:0
- Paul Gonzales (USA) def. Marcelino Bolivar (VEN), 5:0

=== Final ===
- Paul Gonzales (USA) def. Salvatore Todisco (ITA), walk-over
