= Morocco at the 1988 Summer Olympics =

- IOC code: MAR
- NOC: Moroccan Olympic Committee

in Seoul
- Competitors: 27 (24 men and 3 women) in 4 sports
- Flag bearer: Faouzi Lahbi
- Medals Ranked 28th: Gold 1 Silver 0 Bronze 2 Total 3

Summer Olympics appearances (overview)
- 1960; 1964; 1968; 1972; 1976; 1980; 1984; 1988; 1992; 1996; 2000; 2004; 2008; 2012; 2016; 2020; 2024

Morocco competed at the 1988 Summer Olympics in Seoul, South Korea.

== Competitors ==
The following is the list of number of competitors in the Games.

| Sport | Men | Women | Total |
|---|---|---|---|
| Athletics | 8 | 3 | 11 |
| Boxing | 7 | – | 7 |
| Judo | 4 | – | 4 |
| Wrestling | 5 | – | 5 |
| Total | 24 | 3 | 27 |

== Medalists ==
| Medal | Name | Sport | Event | Date |
|---|---|---|---|---|
| Gold | Brahim Boutayeb | Athletics | Men's 10,000 metres | 26 September |
| Bronze | Saïd Aouita | Athletics | Men's 800 metres | 26 September |
| Bronze | Abdelhak Achik | Boxing | Featherweight | 29 September |

== Athletics ==
Men
Track and road events

| Athlete | Event | Heat Round 1 | | Heat Round 2 | | Semifinal | | Final | |
| Athlete | Event | Time | Rank | Time | Rank | Time | Rank | Time | Rank |
|---|---|---|---|---|---|---|---|---|---|
| Saïd Aouita | 800 metres | 1:49.67 | 30 Q | 1:45.24 | 1 Q | 1:44.79 | 4 Q | 1:44.06 | 3rd place, bronze medalist(s) |
| Faouzi Lahbi | 800 metres | 1:47.82 | 19 Q | 1:47.32 | 24 | Did not advance | | | |
| Saïd Aouita | 1500 metres | 3:42.18 | 24 Q | —N/a | | DNS | | Did not advance | |
| Mustapha Lachaal | 1500 metres | 3:39.20 | 5 Q | —N/a | | 3:45.65 | 22 | Did not advance | |
| Abdelmajide Moncif | 1500 metres | 3:41.73 | 18 q | —N/a | | DNF | | Did not advance | |
| Brahim Boutayeb | 10,000 metres | 28:17.61 | 9 Q | —N/a | | | | 27:21.46 OR | 1st place, gold medalist(s) |
| Moustafa El-Nechchadi | Marathon | —N/a | | | | | | DNF | |
| Noureddine Sobhi | Marathon | —N/a | | | | | | 2:19:56 | 30 |
| Abdelaziz Sahere | 3000 metres steeplechase | DQ | | —N/a | | Did not advance | | | |

Women
Track and road events

| Athlete | Event | Heat Round 1 | | Heat Round 2 | | Semifinal | | Final | |
| Athlete | Event | Time | Rank | Time | Rank | Time | Rank | Time | Rank |
|---|---|---|---|---|---|---|---|---|---|
| Meryem Oumezdi | 100 metres | 11.90 | 41 | Did not advance | | | | | |
| Fatima Aouam | 1500 metres | 4:06.87 | 8 q | —N/a | | | | 4:08.00 | 10 |
| Fatima Aouam | 3000 metres | DNF | | —N/a | | | | Did not advance | |
| El-Hassania Darami | 10,000 metres | 33:01.52 | 28 | —N/a | | | | Did not advance | |

== Boxing ==
| Athlete | Event | Round of 64 | Round of 32 | Round of 16 | Quarterfinals | Semifinals | Final | |
| Athlete | Event | Opposition Result | Opposition Result | Opposition Result | Opposition Result | Opposition Result | Opposition Result | Rank |
|---|---|---|---|---|---|---|---|---|
| Mahjoub M'jirih | Light flyweight | Bye | Demberel (MGL); W 3–2 | Chisenga (ZAM); W 5–0 | Serantes (PHI); L RSC R3 | Did not advance | | |
| Aissa Moukrim | Flyweight | Bye | Abed (ALG); L 2–3 | Did not advance | | | | |
| Mohamed Achik | Bantamweight | Mayanja (SWE); L 1–4 | Did not advance | | | | | |
| Abdelhak Achik | Featherweight | Bye | Avelar (ESA); W 4–1 | Catarí (VEN); W KO | Liu (CHN); W KO | Parisi (ITA); L RSC R1 | Did not advance | 3rd place, bronze medalist(s) |
| Kamal Marjouane (Note: also competed at the 1992 Summer Olympics) | Lightweight | Bye | Gbay (LBR); W 5–0 | Arroyo (PUR); W 3–2 | Enkhbat (MGL); L 0–5 | Did not advance | | |
| Khalid Rahilou | Light welterweight | Avaavau (WSM); W RSC R3 | Foster (USA); L KO | Did not advance | | | | |
| Abdellah Taouane | Welterweight | Đỗ (VIE); W 5–0 | Mehnert (GDR); L 0–5 | Did not advance | | | | |

== Judo ==
| Athlete | Event | Round of 64 | Round of 32 | Round of 16 | Quarterfinals | Semifinals | Repechage | | | Final | |
| Athlete | Event | Round of 64 | Round of 32 | Round of 16 | Quarterfinals | Semifinals | Round 1 | Round 2 | Round 3 | Final | |
| Athlete | Event | Opposition Result | Opposition Result | Opposition Result | Opposition Result | Opposition Result | Opposition Result | Opposition Result | Opposition Result | Opposition Result | Rank |
|---|---|---|---|---|---|---|---|---|---|---|---|
| Driss El-Mamoun | 65 kg | Sabali (LIB); W Ippon | Safar (KUW); W Yuko | Cooper (NZL); L Ippon | Did not advance | | | | | | |
| Abdelhak Maach | 71 kg | Bye | Brown (GBR); L Koka | Did not advance | | | | | | | |
| Ahmed Barbach | 95 kg | —N/a | Bye | Beutler (POL); L Waza-ari | Did not advance | | | | | | |
| Abderrahim Lahcinia | +95 kg | —N/a | Flexa (BRA); L Ippon | Did not advance | | | | | | | |

== Wrestling ==
Greco-Roman

| Athlete | Event | Group Stage | | | | | | | | Final | |
| Athlete | Event | Opposition Result | Opposition Result | Opposition Result | Opposition Result | Opposition Result | Opposition Result | Opposition Result | Rank | Opposition Result | Rank |
|---|---|---|---|---|---|---|---|---|---|---|---|
| Abderrahman Naanaa | 52 kg | Lee (KOR); L 2–17 | Stjernberg (SWE); L 3–5 | Did not advance | | | | —N/a | 7 | Did not advance | |
| Kacem Bouallouche | 57 kg | Bye | Amado (USA); L Fall | Balov (BUL); L 0–16 | Did not advance | | | —N/a | 8 | Did not advance | |
| Brahim Loksairi | 62 kg | Lakhal (TUN); W 2–1 | Tracz (POL); L Passivity | Anderson (USA); L Passivity | Did not advance | | —N/a | | 8 | Did not advance | |
| Saïd Souaken | 68 kg | Manzur (ESA); W Passivity | Sabo (YUG); L Passivity | Sipilä (FIN); L 0–7 | Did not advance | | | | 10 | Did not advance | |
| Abdelaziz Tahir | 74 kg | Bye | Tallroth (SWE); L Passivity | Takács (HUN); L 1–7 | Did not advance | | | —N/a | 5 | Did not advance | |
