= Oh Kwang-soo =

South Korean boxer (born 1965)

O Gwang-Su
Personal information
- Full name: 오 광수
- Nationality: South Korea
- Born: October 30, 1965 (age 60) Goheung, South Jeolla Province, South Korea
- Height: 1.67 m (5 ft 5 1/2 in)
- Weight: 48 kg (106 lb)

Sport
- Sport: Boxing
- Weight class: Light Flyweight
Medal record
World Amateur Championships
Bronze medal – third place	1986 Reno	Light Flyweight
Asian Games
Gold medal – first place	1986 Seoul	Light Flyweight
Asian Championships
Gold medal – first place	1983 Okinawa	Light Flyweight
Gold medal – first place	1987 Kuwait City	Light Flyweight
World Cup
Gold medal – first place	1985 Seoul	Light Flyweight

Oh Kwang-Soo (Korean: 오광수; born October 30, 1965, in Goheung, South Jeolla Province) is a former South Korean boxer.

== Amateur career ==
In 1985, Oh won the light flyweight gold medal at the Boxing World Cup. He defeated 1983 Pan American Games gold medalist Rafael Ramos in the semifinal bout.

In 1986, Oh won the bronze medal at the World Amateur Boxing Championships. In the preliminary bout, he beat Róbert Isaszegi, who won bronze at the 1988 Olympics, by RSC, scoring three knockdowns in the first round. In the second round, he defeated Commonwealth Games gold medalist Scotty Olson. In the quarter-final, Oh defeated another Olympic bronze medalist Marcelino Bolivar. He lost in the semi-final to Luis Román Rolón who was later disqualified after failing a drug test.

Oh competed at the 1988 Summer Olympics where he was a favorite to medal, however, he was eliminated in his first bout by a narrow 3–2 decision against eventual silver medalist and future hall of fame champion Michael Carbajal. Oh had defeated Carbajal by a 3–0 margin in a previous meeting.

=== Results ===
1985 Boxing World Cup
Event	Round	Result	Opponent	Score
Light Flyweight	Quarterfinal	Win	(Venezuela) Marcelino Bolivar	4-1
Light Flyweight	Semifinal	Win	(Puerto Rico) Rafael Ramos	4-1
Light Flyweight	Final	Win	(Thailand) Supap Boonro	5-0

1986 World Championships
Event	Round	Result	Opponent	Score
Light Flyweight	First	Win	(Hungary) Robert Isaszegi	RSC 1
Light Flyweight	Second	Win	(Canada) Scotty Olson	5-0
Light Flyweight	Quarterfinal	Win	(Venezuela) Marcelino Bolivar	4-1
Light Flyweight	Semifinal	Loss	(Puerto Rico) Luis Roman Rolon	1-4

1988 Summer Olympics
Event	Round	Result	Opponent	Score
Light Flyweight	First	bye		
Light Flyweight	Second	Loss	(United States) Michael Carbajal	2-3

== Pro career ==
In February 1990, Oh made his pro debut in minimumweight, and after only six fights challenged Ricardo Lopez for the WBC minimumweight title on January 31, 1993. However, he was TKO'd in the 9th round. Oh had struggled to make weight to minimumweight, and eventually retired after the bout with a record of 6-1-0 without moving up a weight class.
