= Ivailo Marinov =

Bulgarian boxer (born 1960)

Medal record

Representing Bulgaria

Men's Boxing

Olympic Games
Gold medal – first place	1988 Seoul	Light Flyweight
Bronze medal – third place	1980 Moscow	Light Flyweight

World Amateur Championships
Gold medal – first place	1982 Munich	Light Flyweight

European Amateur Championships
Gold medal – first place	1981 Tampere	Light Flyweight
Gold medal – first place	1983 Varna	Light Flyweight
Gold medal – first place	1989 Athens	Light Flyweight
Gold medal – first place	1991 Gothenburg	Light Flyweight
Silver medal – second place	1985 Budapest	Light Flyweight

World Cup
Gold medal – first place	1981 Montreal	Light Flyweight

Ivailo Marinov (Bulgarian: Ивайло Маринов; born 13 July 1960 in Varna, also known as Ismail Mustafov, Ismail Huseinov or Ivailo Khristov) is a Bulgarian boxer of Muslim Romani ancestry, who won the bronze medal at the 1980 Summer Olympics in light flyweight, and the gold medal in the same category at the 1988 Summer Olympics

== Amateur career ==
Besides his Olympics results, Marinov also won the gold medal at the World Championship in 1982.

Marinov also won four gold medals in the European Boxing Championships in 1981, 1983, 1989 and 1991 and a silver medal in 1985.

== 1980 Olympic results ==
Below is the record of Ivailo Marinov, a Bulgarian light flyweight boxer who competed at the 1980 Moscow Olympics:

- Round of 32: bye
- Round of 16: Defeated Gerard Hawkins (Ireland) by decision, 5-0
- Quarterfinal: Defeated Ahmed Siad (Algeria) by decision, 5-0
- Semifinal: Lost to Hipolito Ramos (Cuba) by decision, 1-4 (was awarded bronze medal)

== 1988 Olympic results ==
Below is the record of Ivailo Marinov, a Bulgarian light flyweight boxer who competed at the 1988 Seoul, Olympics:

- Round of 64: bye
- Round of 32: Defeated Mark Epton (Great Britain) by decision, 5-0
- Round of 16: Defeated Henry Martínez (El Salvador) by decision, 5-0
- Quarterfinal: Defeated Alexander Mahmutov (Soviet Union) by decision, 5-0
- Semifinal: Defeated Leopoldo Serantes (Philippines) by decision, 5-0
- Final: Defeated Michael Carbajal (United States) by decision, 5-0 (won gold medal)

== Honors ==
He was picked as Bulgaria's No. 1 Boxer of the 20th Century in a survey conducted by the Bulgarian Association of Boxing Journalists.
