= Leopoldo Serantes =

Filipino boxer (1962–2021)

Personal information
- Nationality: Filipino
- Born: March 15, 1962
- Died: September 1, 2021 (aged 59) Quezon City, Philippines

Sport
- Country: Philippines
- Sport: Boxing
- Weight class: Flyweight, light flyweight
Medal record
Men's amateur boxing
Representing Philippines
Men's Boxing
Olympic Games
Bronze medal – third place	1988 Seoul	Light Flyweight
Asian Championships
Silver medal – second place	1985 Bangkok	Flyweight
Southeast Asian Games
Gold medal – first place	1985 Bangkok	Light flyweight
Gold medal – first place	1987 Jakarta	Light flyweight

Leopoldo Serantes (March 15, 1962 – September 1, 2021) was a Filipino amateur boxer and soldier. He competed at the 1988 Summer Olympics in Seoul, South Korea in the Light Flyweight (-48 kg) division, winning the bronze medal in a lost bout against Ivailo Marinov from Bulgaria in the semifinals. Serantes' win marked the first time in 24 years that an athlete from the Philippines won an Olympic medal since boxer Anthony Villanueva, his head coach, won a silver medal at the 1964 Summer Olympics, and he became the sixth Filipino overall to be awarded an Olympic medal.

== Career ==
Serantes was a Philippine Army sergeant when he competed at the 1988 Olympics.

=== Southeast Asian Games ===
Bicol native Leopoldo Serantes was a member of the Philippine national boxing team during the 1980s. He is noted for having been the only gold medalist for the Philippines in the 1985 Southeast Asian Games in Bangkok, defeating Thai boxer Supad Boonrowd in the men's 48kg final. Serantes also successfully defended his title in the 1987 Southeast Asian Games in Indonesia, and he was one of two Filipinos who won a gold medal in boxing in that edition of the games.

=== 1988 Olympic results ===
Below is Serantes' boxing competition record in the light flyweight division at the 1988 Seoul Olympics:

- Round of 64: Bye
- Round of 32: Defeated Hassan Mustafa (Egypt) referee stopped contest in the second round
- Round of 16: Defeated Sammy Stewart (Liberia) by decision, 5–0
- Quarterfinals: Defeated Mahjoub Mjirich (Morocco) referee stopped contest in third round
- Semifinal: Lost to Ivailo Khristov (Bulgaria) by decision, 0-5 (was awarded bronze medal)

Serantes was assured of an $18,500 bonus from a group of Filipino businessmen following his bronze win.

== Later life ==
Serantes suffered from a long history of pulmonary illness later in life. In January 2021, he was reportedly placed under intensive care at the Philippine Veterans Hospital due to a serious pulmonary and heart condition. Bounty Agro Ventures committed to give Serantes a monthly allowance of ₱100,000 for life to help pay his medical bills and needs.

== Death ==
Serantes died on September 1, 2021, at the age of 59 due to complications of chronic obstructive pulmonary disease.
