= Salvatore Todisco =

Italian boxer (1961–1990)

Medal record

Men's boxing

Representing Italy

Olympic Games
| Silver medal – second place | 1984 Los Angeles | Light Flyweight |

European Amateur Championships
| Silver medal – second place | 1983 Varna | Light Flyweight |

Mediterranean Games
| Bronze medal – third place | 1983 Casablanca | Light Flyweight |
| Bronze medal – third place | 1987 Latakia | Light Flyweight |

Salvatore Todisco (August 30, 1961, in Naples – November 25, 1990) was a light flyweight boxer from Italy, who won the silver medal in the light flyweight division (– 48 kg) at the 1984 Summer Olympics in Los Angeles, California. In the final he was defeated by Paul Gonzales of the United States. He died in a car accident on November 25, 1990 at the age of 29.

== 1984 Olympic results ==
Below are the Olympic results of Salvatore Todisco, an Italian light flyweight boxer who competed at the 1984 Los Angeles Olympics:

- Round of 32: bye
- Round of 16: Defeated Gerard Hawkins (Ireland) by decision, 5-0
- Quarterfinal: Defeated Rafael Ramos (Puerto Rico) by decision, 4-1
- Semifinal: Defeated Keith Mwila (Zambia) by decision, 5-0
- Final: Lost to Paul Gonzales (United States) by walkover (was awarded the silver medal)
