= Michael Carbajal =

American boxer

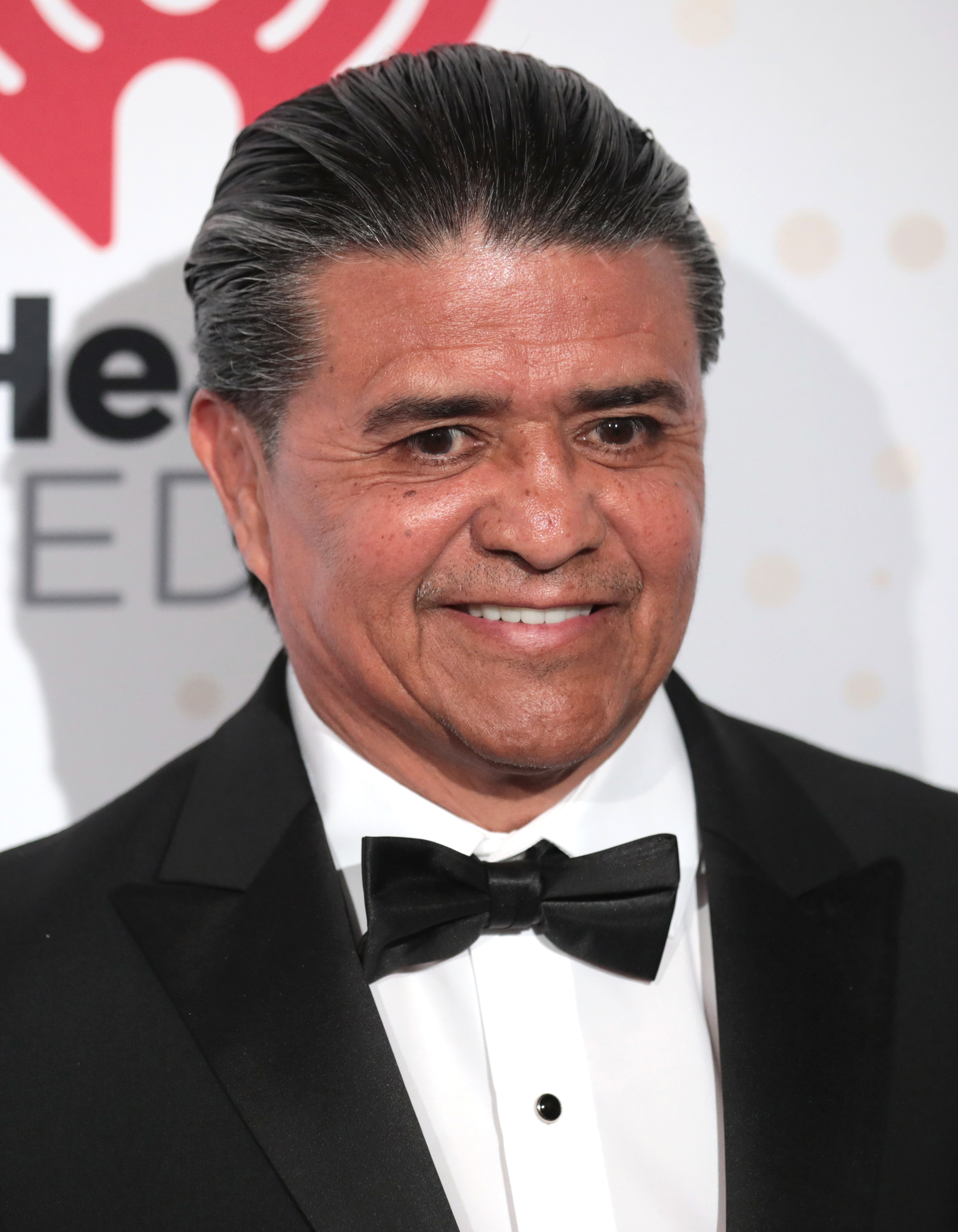
- Carbajal in 2023

Personal information
- Nickname: Manitas de Piedra (Little Hands of Stone)
- Born: September 17, 1967 (age 59) Phoenix, U.S.
- Height: 5 ft 5.5 in (1.66 m)
- Weight: Light Flyweight

Boxing career
- Reach: 63 in (160 cm)
- Stance: Orthodox

Boxing record
- Total fights: 53
- Wins: 49
- Win by KO: 33
- Losses: 4
Medal record
Men's boxing
Representing the United States
Olympic Games
| Silver medal – second place | 1988 Seoul | Light flyweight |
Pan American Games
| Silver medal – second place | 1987 Indianapolis | Light Flyweight |

Michael Carbajal (born September 17, 1967) is an American six-time world champion boxer of Mexican descent. His nickname was "Little Hands of Stone" after his favorite boxer, "Hands of Stone" Roberto Durán.

== Amateur career ==
Carbajal had an amateur record of 94-9 and won a silver medal as a light flyweight at 1988 Seoul Olympics in South Korea.

=== Highlights ===
- 1986 National Golden Gloves Light Flyweight champion
- 1987 – Carbajal won the silver medal at the 1987 Pan American Games
- 1988 – United States amateur Light Flyweight champion

=== 1988 Olympic Results ===
Below are the results of Michael Carbajal, an American light flyweight boxer who competed at the 1988 Seoul Olympics:

- Round of 32: Defeated Kwang-Soo Oh (South Korea) points (3:2 decision)
- Round of 16: Defeated Dang Hieu Hien (Vietnam) points
- Quarterfinal: Defeated Scotty Olson (Canada) points
- Semifinal: Defeated Robert Isaszegi (Hungary) points
- Final: Lost to Ivailo Marinov (Bulgaria) points (0:5 decision)

There were suspicions of politics influencing the judges in Carbajal's decision loss in the gold medal bout.

== Professional career ==
Seven months after the Olympics, in February 1989, Carbajal made his debut in front of a national television audience as part of the card where Duran became a four-time world champion by beating Iran Barkley in Atlantic City. In his first fight, Carbajal outboxed another future world champion, Will Grigsby.

Carbajal followed that win with a spectacular first-round knockout of Silviano Perez on NBC. In his tenth bout, he met Pedro Feliciano, handling him a ten-round beating. Four more wins followed, and Carbajal was presented with an opportunity to fight for a world championship.

=== IBF light flyweight title ===
On July 29, 1990, Carbajal faced Muangchai Kittikasem, who came to Phoenix from Thailand to defend his IBF light flyweight world championship. Carbajal methodically took apart the champion in front of an ABC national audience. In round 7, after a combination of punches left Kittikasem lying defenseless against the ropes, the referee stepped in and stopped the fight, making Carbajal the world champion for the first time in his career.

Carbajal began a string of twelve victories over the next two and a half years, including six title defenses against challengers such as Leon Salazar, Hector Patri, Kim Kwang-Sun and Robinson Cuesta, and a win over future champion Jesus Chong in a non-title fight.

=== Unification against Humberto "Chiquita" Gonzalez ===
He then fought a highly anticipated unification match with WBC world champion Humberto González on March 13, 1993. Carbajal and Gonzalez became the first Junior Flyweights in history to earn a million dollar purse, and it was the first Junior Flyweight "superfight" and championship bout to headline a Pay Per View event.

Carbajal was downed in rounds 2 and 5, and he was bleeding from his right eyebrow when he blasted a tremendous left hand to the side of Gonzalez's chin in the seventh round. Gonzalez turned sideways, and Carbajal landed another right hand that sent him to the canvas. Gonzalez could not beat the count, and Michael Carbajal had unified the world's Junior Flyweight championship in The Ring's fight of the year. He would also be named fighter of the year for 1993.

Many television endorsement deals followed, including printed and television ads for Diet Pepsi and Emergency Chiropractic, but trouble seemed to follow, as well. He was accused of firing gunshots onto the roof of a party in Scottsdale.

This unwanted attention seemed to take its toll on Carbajal, and after two additional defenses, he fought Gonzalez once again in a pay-per-view match in Los Angeles, California. In his 11th world title fight, Carbajal suffered the first loss of his career as he was defeated by a controversial 12 round split decision.

=== WBO light flyweight title ===
Carbajal next took on former sparring partner Abner Barajas, winning by a fifth-round knockout in Laughlin, Nevada, and then was given another shot at a world title by the WBO world title holder Josue Camacho, who came from Puerto Rico to the challenger's hometown to defend his title. Carbajal put on a brilliant performance and won a unanimous twelve-round decision over Camacho.

A title holder again, Carbajal set to try to recover his International Boxing Federation and WBC belts against Gonzalez in a third unification bout between the boxers. In November 1994, three months after the Camacho victory, they met once again, this time in Mexico City. Once again, it was a split decision, and once again, Carbajal came out on the losing end. He wouldn't give up, however, and he kept training under the guidance of his brother, Danny Carbajal, the only man ever to train Michael.

=== IBF light flyweight title ===
He put another string of seven wins together, against the likes of former world champion Jose Quirino, whom he stopped in one round, and tough Mauro Salas, who lasted seven. Then he met two-time world champion Melchor Cob Castro in Las Vegas for the vacant International Boxing Federation junior flyweight world title. Carbajal beat Castro by unanimous decision to claim his fourth world title.

His third title reign lasted 22 months and three defenses, including an eighth-round knockout of tough two-time challenger Tomas Rivera, before he lost his crown again. On January 18, 1997, Carbajal suddenly looked aged and was unable to do anything against the charges of Colombian Mauricio Pastrana. Carbajal still made the fight close, but lost a twelve-round split decision.

After that, Carbajal met Canada's Scotty Olson in San Antonio, Texas. Carbajal showed he had more left than Olson did, and dominated the fight until a spectacular right hand sent Olson down for the count in round 11.

The win over Olson gave Carbajal a minor title, but in July 1997 in Las Vegas once again, he was defeated by South Africa's Jacob Matlala. Matlala handed Carbajal his first inside the distance defeat ever, stopping the past-his-prime former world champion in round nine via cuts. Carbajal did not fight for 19 months after this defeat.

=== Second comeback, WBO title win, and retirement ===
Carbajal announced a comeback early in 1999. He won three bouts, including a tko victory over former champion José de Jesús, and on July 31, 1999, he took the short flight from Phoenix to Tijuana to challenge WBO junior flyweight world champion Jorge Arce, who was fighting in his hometown. Arce dominated Carbajal for nine of the first ten rounds, but Carbajal floored the 21-year-old Arce in the sixth round. The fight moved along, and in the 11th round, Carbajal struck Arce with a right hand that sent him into the ropes. The referee stopped the fight, and Michael Carbajal was a world champion for the fourth time.

After this fight, Carbajal retired as a world champ. Carbajal is trying to live a quieter life nowadays in Phoenix, but he does many public appearances. He enjoys meeting his public and signing autographs for his fans. Carbajal also owns two boxing gyms in Phoenix.

Michael Carbajal and former rival Humberto González were elected together to the International Boxing Hall of Fame in 2006.

His career record was 49 wins against four losses, with 33 wins coming by way of knockout.

== Professional boxing record ==
| 53 fights | 49 wins | 4 losses |
|---|---|---|
| By knockout | 33 | 1 |
| By decision | 16 | 3 |

| No. | Result | Record | Opponent | Type | Round, time | Date | Location | Notes |
|---|---|---|---|---|---|---|---|---|
| 53 | Win | 49–4 | Jorge Arce | TKO | 11 (12) | Jul 31, 1999 | Plaza de Toros El Toreo, Tijuana, Mexico | Won WBO light flyweight title |
| 52 | Win | 48–4 | Oscar Calzada | TKO | 4 (12) | Jul 2, 1999 | Convention Center, Tucson, Arizona, U.S. | Won WBO latino light flyweight title |
| 51 | Win | 47–4 | Oscar Andrade | UD | 10 | May 8, 1999 | Miccosukee Indian Gaming Resort, Miami, Florida, U.S. | |
| 50 | Win | 46–4 | Jose De Jesus | RTD | 6 (10) | Feb 27, 1999 | India Cultural Center, Tampa, Florida, U.S. | |
| 49 | Loss | 45–4 | Jacob Matlala | TKO | 9 (12) | Jul 18, 1997 | Thomas & Mack Center, Las Vegas, Nevada, U.S. | Lost IBA light flyweight title |
| 48 | Win | 45–3 | Scotty Olson | KO | 10 (12) | Mar 22, 1997 | Memorial Coliseum, Corpus Christi, Texas, U.S. | Won vacant IBA light flyweight title |
| 47 | Loss | 44–3 | Mauricio Pastrana | SD | 12 | Jan 18, 1997 | Thomas & Mack Center, Las Vegas, Nevada, U.S. | Lost IBF light flyweight title |
| 46 | Win | 44–2 | Tomas Cordoba | TKO | 3 (10) | Dec 10, 1996 | Memorial Coliseum (Corpus Christi), Corpus Christi, Texas, U.S. | |
| 45 | Win | 43–2 | Tomas Rivera | KO | 5 (12) | Oct 12, 1996 | Arrowhead Pond, Anaheim, California, U.S. | Retained IBF light flyweight title |
| 44 | Win | 42–2 | Julio Coronel | TKO | 8 (12) | Sep 13, 1996 | Knapp Center, Des Moines, Iowa, U.S. | Retained IBF light flyweight title |
| 43 | Win | 41–2 | Manuel Sarabia | KO | 1 (10) | Jul 14, 1996 | Mammoth Gardens, Denver, Colorado, U.S. | |
| 42 | Win | 40–2 | Melchor Cob Castro | UD | 12 | Mar 16, 1996 | MGM Grand Garden Arena, Las Vegas, Nevada, U.S. | Won vacant IBF light flyweight title |
| 41 | Win | 39–2 | Mauro Diaz | TKO | 7 (10) | Feb 19, 1996 | Club Rio, Tempe, Arizona, U.S. | |
| 40 | Win | 38–2 | Francisco Montiel | KO | 4 (10) | Nov 16, 1995 | Veteran's Memorial Coliseum, Phoenix, Arizona, U.S. | |
| 39 | Win | 37–2 | Gregorio Garcia | KO | 3 (6) | Sep 16, 1995 | Mirage Hotel and Casino, Las Vegas, Nevada, U.S. | |
| 38 | Win | 36–2 | Jose Quirino | KO | 1 (10) | Aug 12, 1995 | MGM Grand Garden Arena, Las Vegas, Nevada, U.S. | |
| 37 | Win | 35–2 | Andres Cazares | RTD | 5 (10) | Jun 20, 1995 | Civic Auditorium, Bakersfield, California, U.S. | |
| 36 | Win | 34–2 | Francisco Carrasco | KO | 4 (10) | May 24, 1995 | Civic Auditorium, Bakersfield, California, U.S. | |
| 35 | Win | 33–2 | Armando Diaz | UD | 10 | Apr 1, 1995 | Buffalos Bill’s Star Arena, Primm, Nevada, U.S. | |
| 34 | Loss | 32–2 | Humberto Gonzalez | MD | 12 | Nov 12, 1994 | Monumental Plaza de Toros Mexico, Mexico City, Mexico | For WBC and IBF light flyweight titles |
| 33 | Win | 32–1 | Josue Camacho | UD | 12 | Jul 15, 1994 | America West Arena, Phoenix, Arizona, U.S. | Won WBO light flyweight title |
| 32 | Win | 31–1 | Abner Barajas | TKO | 3 (10) | Apr 8, 1994 | Hilton Hotel, Laughlin, Nevada, U.S. | |
| 31 | Loss | 30–1 | Humberto Gonzalez | SD | 12 | Feb 19, 1994 | Great Western Forum, Inglewood, California, U.S. | Lost WBC and IBF light flyweight titles |
| 30 | Win | 30–0 | Domingo Sosa | TKO | 5 (12) | Oct 30, 1993 | America West Arena, Phoenix, Arizona, U.S. | Retained WBC and IBF light flyweight titles |
| 29 | Win | 29–0 | Kim Kwang-sun | TKO | 7 (12) | Jul 17, 1993 | Caesars Palace, Paradise, Nevada, U.S. | Retained WBC and IBF light flyweight titles |
| 28 | Win | 28–0 | Humberto Gonzalez | KO | 7 (12) | Mar 13, 1993 | Hilton Hotel, Las Vegas, Nevada, U.S. | Retained IBF light flyweight title; Won WBC light flyweight title |
| 27 | Win | 27–0 | Robinson Cuesta | TKO | 8 (12) | Dec 12, 1992 | America West Arena, Phoenix, Arizona, U.S. | Retained IBF light flyweight title |
| 26 | Win | 26–0 | Jose Manuel Diaz | RTD | 7 (10) | Oct 14, 1992 | Rosemont Horizon, Rosemont, Illinois, U.S. | |
| 25 | Win | 25–0 | Jorge Luis Roman | UD | 10 | Aug 13, 1992 | Veteran's Memorial Coliseum, Phoenix, Arizona, U.S. | |
| 24 | Win | 24–0 | Jose Luis Velarde | UD | 10 | Apr 30, 1992 | Tingley Coliseum, Albuquerque, New Mexico, U.S. | |
| 23 | Win | 23–0 | Marcos Pacheco | UD | 12 | Feb 17, 1992 | Civic Plaza, Phoenix, Arizona, U.S. | Retained IBF light flyweight title |
| 22 | Win | 22–0 | Jesus Chong | UD | 10 | Oct 18, 1991 | Convention Center, Atlantic City, New Jersey, U.S. | |
| 21 | Win | 21–0 | Héctor Patri | UD | 12 | May 10, 1991 | John O’Donnell Stadium, Davenport, Iowa, U.S. | Retained IBF light flyweight title |
| 20 | Win | 20–0 | Javier Varguez | UD | 12 | Mar 17, 1991 | Bally’s Las Vegas, Las Vegas, Nevada, U.S. | Retained IBF light flyweight title |
| 19 | Win | 19–0 | Macario Santos | KO | 2 (12) | Feb 17, 1991 | Caesars Palace, Paradise, Nevada, U.S. | Retained IBF light flyweight title |
| 18 | Win | 18–0 | Leon Salazar | KO | 4 (12) | Dec 8, 1990 | Rawhide Western Theme Park, Scottsdale, Arizona, U.S. | Retained IBF light flyweight title |
| 17 | Win | 17–0 | Luis Monzote | KO | 5 (10) | Oct 25, 1990 | Civic Plaza, Phoenix, Arizona, U.S. | |
| 16 | Win | 16–0 | Oscar Calzada | TKO | 3 (10) | Sep 20, 1990 | Bally’s Las Vegas, Las Vegas, Nevada, U.S. | |
| 15 | Win | 15–0 | Muangchai Kittikasem | TKO | 7 (12) | Jul 29, 1990 | Veteran's Memorial Coliseum, Phoenix, Arizona, U.S. | Won IBF light flyweight title |
| 14 | Win | 14–0 | Fernando Martinez | TKO | 9 (12) | Jun 14, 1990 | The Holiday Casino, Las Vegas, Nevada, U.S. | Retained NABF light flyweight title |
| 13 | Win | 13–0 | Raul Acosta | UD | 10 | Apr 1, 1990 | Caesars Tahoe, Stateline, Nevada, U.S. | |
| 12 | Win | 12–0 | Tony DeLuca | UD | 12 | Feb 18, 1990 | Civic Plaza, Phoenix, Arizona, U.S. | Won NABF light flyweight title |
| 11 | Win | 11–0 | Miguel Angel Banda | UD | 8 | Jan 12, 1990 | Trump Plaza Hotel, Atlantic City, New Jersey, U.S. | |
| 10 | Win | 10–0 | Pedro Jose Feliciano | UD | 10 | Nov 17, 1989 | Civic Plaza, Phoenix, Arizona, U.S. | |
| 9 | Win | 9–0 | Jose Manuel Diaz | TKO | 3 (8) | Oct 17, 1989 | State Fair, Phoenix, Arizona, U.S. | |
| 8 | Win | 8–0 | Jose Luis Herrera | UD | 8 | Sep 5, 1989 | Harrah’s Hotel and Casino, Stateline, Nevada, U.S. | |
| 7 | Win | 7–0 | Prudencio De Jesus | KO | 2 (6) | Aug 14, 1989 | Lawlor Events Center, Reno, Nevada, U.S. | |
| 6 | Win | 6–0 | Francisco Lueveno | TKO | 2 (6) | Jul 15, 1989 | Harrah’s Marina Hotel Casino, Atlantic City, New Jersey, U.S. | |
| 5 | Win | 5–0 | Eduardo Nunez | KO | 4 (6) | Jun 12, 1989 | Caesars Palace, Paradise, Nevada, U.S. | |
| 4 | Win | 4–0 | Pedro Espinoza | TKO | 1 (4) | May 21, 1989 | Veteran's Memorial Coliseum, Phoenix, Arizona, U.S. | |
| 3 | Win | 3–0 | Camerino Rojas | KO | 2 (4) | May 2, 1989 | Harrah’s Hotel and Casino, Stateline, Nevada, U.S. | |
| 2 | Win | 2–0 | Silvestre Peraza | TKO | 1 (4) | Apr 4, 1989 | Veteran's Memorial Coliseum, Phoenix, Arizona, U.S. | |
| 1 | Win | 1–0 | Will Grigsby | UD | 4 | Feb 24, 1989 | Convention Center, Atlantic City, New Jersey, U.S. | |

== See also ==
- List of light-flyweight boxing champions

Sporting positions
Regional boxing titles
| Vacant Title last held by Victor Godoi | WBO super flyweight champion Latino title July 2 – 31, 1999; Won world light flyweight title | Vacant Title next held by Joel Luna Zárate |
Minor world boxing titles
| New title | IBA light flyweight champion March 23 – July 18, 1997 | Succeeded by Jacob Matlala |
Major world boxing titles
| Preceded by Muangchai Kittikasem | IBF light flyweight champion July 29, 1990 – February 19, 1994 | Succeeded by Humberto González |
| Preceded by Humberto González | WBC light flyweight champion March 13, 1993 – February 19, 1994 | Succeeded by Humberto González |
| Inaugural Champion | Lineal Light Flyweight Champion; March 13, 1993 – February 19, 1994 | Succeeded by Humberto González |
| Preceded by Josué Camacho | WBO light flyweight champion July 15, 1994 – November 12, 1994; Stripped | Vacant Title next held by Paul Weir |
| Vacant Title last held by Saman Sorjaturong | IBF light flyweight champion March 16, 1996 – January 18, 1997 | Succeeded by Mauricio Pastrana |
| Preceded by Jorge Arce | WBO light flyweight champion July 31, 1999 – August 1999; Retires | Vacant Title next held by Masibulele Makepula |
Awards
| Preceded by Kostya Tszyu | The Ring magazine Comeback of the Year; 1999 | Succeeded by Virgil Hill |
| Previous: Riddick Bowe W12; Evander Holyfield | The Ring Magazine fight of the year KO7 Humberto González; 1993 | Next: Jorge Castro KO9; John David Jackson |
