= Abbas Khalaf (boxer) =

Iraqi boxer

Personal information
- Full name: Abbas Khalaf Zeghayer
- Nationality: Iraqi

Sport
- Sport: Boxing

Abbas Khalaf Zeghayer (Arabic: عباس خلف زغير) is an Iraqi boxer. He competed in the men's light flyweight event at the 1984 Summer Olympics. At the 1984 Summer Olympics, he lost to William Bagonza of Uganda.

He also participated at the 1986 Asian Games in South Korea but lost in the first round to Orlando Tacuyan from the Philippines.
