= Josué Camacho =

Puerto Rican boxer (born 1969)

Josue Camacho
Personal information
- Nickname: Dickie
- Nationality: (Puerto Rico) Puerto Rican
- Born: Josue Camacho Santiago; January 31, 1969 (age 57) Guaynabo, Puerto Rico
- Height: 5 ft 4 in (163 cm)
- Weight: Light flyweight; Flyweight

Boxing career

Boxing record
- Total fights: 25
- Wins: 16
- Win by KO: 6
- Losses: 9
- Draws: 0
- No contests: 0

Josué Camacho Santiago (born January 31, 1969) is a Puerto Rican who was a world boxing champion. He was born in Guaynabo, Puerto Rico. His nickname is Dickie, and he was sometimes advertised as Dickie Camacho.

== Professional boxing career ==
Camacho began his professional boxing career, after a stellar amateur career, when he fought another debutante, Reynaldo Vazquez, in San Juan, Puerto Rico, August 27 of 1988. Camacho won by a four-round decision.

On October 6 of that year, Camacho fought undefeated (2–0–1) Jose Luis De Jesus in Guaynabo, winning by a four-round split decision. Less than a month later, he scored his first knockout win, beating Luis Vargas on November 3, by a third-round knockout, in Trujillo Alto, Puerto Rico.

Camacho rested during 1989, then returned in 1990, first taking on Ray Ortega, 0–0–1, on May 12 of that year in San Juan, winning by a four-round unanimous decision. He followed that win up with a second-round knockout of Evy Vazquez, who was 0-5 coming in, at the Olympic Auditorium in Miramar, Santurce, Puerto Rico, on June 2.

On August 4, 1990, Camacho fought Miguel Santos, 1–7–1, at Pedrin Zorrilla Coliseum in San Juan, winning by technical knockout in four rounds. One month and eleven days later, on September 15, he returned to action at the same coliseum, this time meeting Julio Cesar Acevedo, 3–3–1, and winning by eight round unanimous decision. On October 20 of that year (1990), he had a rematch with Jose Luis De Jesus, by then 5–2–2, at the Pedrin Zorilla Coliseum, knocking De Jesus out in three rounds.

Camacho finished 1990 by fighting Julio Cesar Acevedo in a rematch, this time for the vacant Puerto Rican Light-Flyweight title. Acevedo had not fought since their first match and was 3-4-1 coming in. Acevedo caused a mild upset by knocking Camacho out in round twelve, handing Camacho his first loss as a professional. This bout also took place at the Pedrin Zorrilla Coliseum.

Camacho's next fight was his third rematch encounter in a row. Despite sporting a record of only 2 wins, 9 losses and 1 draw, Miguel Santos was allowed to compete with Camacho for the vacant Puerto Rican Flyweight championship, therefore, on March 21, 1991, at San Juan, Camacho won the national title by outpointing Santos over twelve rounds.

Camacho then fought well-known Puerto Rican Angel Rosario, who had just come off a world title fight loss to Jose Ruiz. On April 27, 1991, at San Juan, Rosario, 11–6–1, outpointed Camacho over ten rounds. Camacho's Puerto Rican Flyweight title was not on the line that night.

Camacho took the rest of 1991 off, then began his 1992 professional boxing campaign with a twelve-round unanimous decision victory on March 27 over undefeated Eduardo Nazario (5–0–1) to retain the Puerto Rican national Flyweight title, at Aguadilla, Puerto Rico. He followed that victory with a win on May 21 over 3-9-1 Luis Ramos, over eight rounds by unanimous decision, also at San Juan.

== World champion ==
Mexican Eduardo "Eddie" Vallejo had a record of 3 wins and 5 losses, with 1 win by knockout, having fought seven of his eight fights after moving from Tamaulipas, Mexico to Tyler, Texas. Despite having a negative win–loss record, after his knockout win over Jesus Vera, he was given an opportunity to fight Camacho for the World Boxing Organization's vacant Light-Flyweight title. Camacho-Vallejo took place on July 31, 1992, at the Caribe Hilton Hotel in San Juan. Camacho became the WBO world Light-Flyweight champion by knocking Vallejo out in round six.

Camacho then took off almost one entire year before returning to the boxing ring. His next bout was a non-title bout against Carlos Juan Rodriguez, 8-4. Fought at Santiago de los Caballeros, Dominican Republic, this was Camacho's first fight abroad as a professional fighter. He beat Rodriguez by a ten-round unanimous decision on July 21, 1993. Next, he had a rubber match with Julio Cesar Acevedo, on September 25 at Guaynabo, avenging one of his earlier losses by knocking Acevedo out in eight rounds, in another non-title affair.

On February 2, 1994, Camacho defended his title for the first time, against future world champion Paul Weir, 7-0 coming in. He retained the title against Weir with a 12-round unanimous decision at Kelvin Hall, in Glasgow, Scotland.

His next fight was televised on ESPN on July 15, 1994, as he faced former and future world champion and future hall-of-famer Michael Carbajal at the America West Arena, only a few blocks away from Carbajal's house at Phoenix, Arizona. In this fight, the referee Tony Gibson, slipped and almost fell out of the ring in round four. Carbajal beat Camacho by a twelve-round unanimous decision to take the WBO title away from the Puerto Rican.

== Career decline ==
Camacho lost his next three fights, effectively completing a four fight losing streak (which started with his title losing effort against Carbajal). These included a challenge of World Boxing Board Flyweight champion Marc Johnson by knockout in eight, exactly one year after the Carbajal fight, on July 15, 1995, at the Great Western Forum in Inglewood, California, (as part of the Saman Sorjaturong-Humberto Gonzalez undercard), a challenge of World Boxing Union Light-Flyweight champion Nungdiaw Sakcharuporn on January 27, 1996, at the Bansaen Stadium, Chonburi, Thailand, when he was beaten by ninth-round technical knockout, and a loss to WBA Fedelatin Light-Flyweight monarch Gilberto Gonzalez, 7–1–1, by a fifth-round technical knockout at Miami, Florida, March 23, 1996.

Camacho retired after the loss to Gonzalez, but then returned on March 4, 1999, defeating Miguel Del Valle by eight-round decision. This turned out to be Camacho's last career victory, and he subsequently lost to Leo Gamez by an eight-round knockout at Roberto Clemente Coliseum in San Juan, May 29, 1999, for the WBA's interim Super-Flyweight title, then to Gerson Guerrero by a first-round knockout at Fantasy Springs Casino in Indio, California, for the vacant North American Boxing Federation's Flyweight title on May 19, 2001, and to Miguel Del Valle in a rematch, May 25, 2002, at the Acropolis in Manati, Puerto Rico, by a twelve-round unanimous decision for the WBC's CABOFE Flyweight championship.

== See also ==
- List of Puerto Rican boxing world champions
- List of light-flyweight boxing champions

Achievements
| Vacant Title last held by José de Jesús | WBO light flyweight champion July 31, 1992 - July 15, 1994 | Succeeded by Michael Carbajal |
