= Carlos Motta =

Carlos Motta may refer to:

- Carlos Motta (artist) (born 1978), Colombian-American artist
- Carlos Motta (boxer) (born 1956), Guatemalan boxer
- Carlos Motta (judoka) (born 1955), Brazilian judoka
