= Darwin Angeles =

Honduran boxer (born 1968)

Darwin Ángeles
Personal information
- Full name: Darwin Ángeles Discua
- Nationality: Honduras
- Born: 22 October 1968 (age 57)
- Height: 1.64 m (5 ft 4 1/2 in)
- Weight: 48 kg (106 lb)

Sport
- Sport: Boxing
- Weight class: Light Flyweight

Darwin Ángeles Discua (born 22 October 1968) is a Honduras retired male boxer. During his career, he competed at the 1988 Summer Olympics and the 1992 Summer Olympics, placing equal 17th in both of his entered events. He also competed at 1993 Central American Boxing Cup and placed third overall with his teammates.

== Biography ==
Darwin Ángeles Discua was born on 22 October 1968. As an athlete, he competed for Honduras in international competition.

Ángeles was selected to compete for Honduras at the 1988 Summer Olympics held in Seoul, South Korea. At the 1988 Summer Games, he was entered to compete in one event, the men's light flyweight event. He received a bye in the first round and went up against Sammy Stewart of Liberia on 17 September in the second round. There, he lost the fight by decision and placed equal 17th alongside 14 other competitors. After the 1988 Summer Games, he competed in the 1993 Central American Boxing Cup held in Tegucigalpa. There, he placed first in the men's flyweight division after winning over Nicaraguan boxer Milton Rojas. Overall, the Honduran team placed third.

At the 1995 Pan American Games held in Mar del Plata, Argentina, Ángeles competed in the men's flyweight division. Against Juan Jose Cotto of Puerto Rico in the Round of 16, he lost 15 to 11 and did not advance. After missing the 1992 Summer Olympics, he then competed in the men's flyweight division at the 1996 Summer Olympics held in Atlanta, United States. He was also the flag bearer for Honduras during the 1996 Summer Games' opening ceremony. He went up against Serhiy Kovhanko of Ukraine on 23 July 1996 in the first round. There, he lost the fight by decision and placed equal 17th alongside 15 other competitors.
