= Jacob Matlala =

South African boxer (born 1962)

Personal information
- Nickname: Baby Jake
- Born: Jacob Matlala; 1 August 1962 Meadowlands, Gauteng, South Africa
- Died: 7 December 2013 (aged 51) Parktown, Gauteng, South Africa
- Height: 4 ft 10 in (147 cm)
- Weight: Flyweight; Light flyweight

Boxing career
- Reach: 59 in (150 cm)
- Stance: Orthodox

Boxing record
- Total fights: 68
- Wins: 53
- Win by KO: 26
- Losses: 13
- Draws: 2
- No contests: 0

Jacob "Baby Jake" Matlala (1 August 1962 – 7 December 2013) was a South African professional boxer and four-time world champion who competed from 1980 to 2002. Standing about 4 ft 10 in (147 cm), he is the shortest boxer in history to win a world title. He was a world champion in two weight classes: having held the World Boxing Organization (WBO) flyweight title from 1993 to 1995 and the WBO light-flyweight from 1995 to 1997. He scored high-profile wins against international opponents during the 1990s. He was a hugely popular national figure in South Africa — admired for his fighting spirit and charitable work — and was publicly counted among Nelson Mandela’s favourite sportspeople. In 2004, Matlala was voted #72 in the "100 Greatest South Africans" poll organized by SABC.

== Early Life ==
Jacob Matlala was born on 1 August 1962 in Meadowlands, Soweto, Johannesburg. He was an only child; his father worked as a driver and mother as a cook. His father introduced Jacob to boxing, taking him to the gym when we was ten years old. His father had previously boxed recreationally, which helped Matlala become familiar with the sport at a young age.

Matlala described his upbringing as ordinary and said his parents taught him to remain focused. He attended school in Soweto and helped with household chores when he returned home. Although his father encouraged his interest in boxing; his mother was initially concerned over the fact that he could be injured or killed in the ring. Matlala later attended University of Witwatersrand before completing a bachelor’s degree in commerce through the University of South Africa (UNISA).

== Amateur career ==
Matlala began boxing at the age of ten, accompanying his father, an aspiring boxer, to the gym. He developed into a successful amateur boxer, reportedly winning 198 of his 199 amateur bouts. He spent approximately 18 years competing as an amateur before turning professional in 1980. His amateur coach, Theo Mthembu, continued to train him after he entered the professional ranks.

== Professional Debut ==
Matlala would make his professional debut on 2 February 1980 against Fraser Plaatjies in New Brighton, Port Elizabeth, winning on points over four rounds. His debut took place before he had officially been granted a professional boxing license by the national boxing commission. He begun his professional career under the guidance of his trainer Theo Mthembu, who had also coached him as an amateur.

== Death ==
Jacob Matlala died on 7 December 2013, at the Charlotte Maxeke Johannesburg Academic Hospital.

== Professional boxing record ==
| 68 fights | 53 wins | 13 losses |
|---|---|---|
| By knockout | 26 | 3 |
| By decision | 26 | 10 |
| By disqualification | 1 | 0 |
| Draws | 2 | |

| No. | Result | Record | Opponent | Type | Round, time | Date | Location | Notes |
|---|---|---|---|---|---|---|---|---|
| 68 | Win | 53–13–2 | Juan Herrera | KO | 7 (12), 1:43 | 2 Mar 2002 | Carnival City, Brakpan, South Africa | Retained WBU light-flyweight title |
| 67 | Win | 52–13–2 | Mickey Cantwell | TKO | 5 (12), 1:59 | 29 Sep 2001 | Elephant & Castle Centre, London, England | Retained WBU light-flyweight title |
| 66 | Win | 51–13–2 | Todd Makelim | TKO | 4 (12), 2:25 | 17 Feb 2001 | Carnival City, Brakpan, South Africa | Won vacant WBU light-flyweight title |
| 65 | Loss | 50–13–2 | Peter Culshaw | MD | 12 | 24 May 2000 | Carnival City, Brakpan, South Africa | For WBU flyweight title |
| 64 | Loss | 50–12–2 | Masibulele Makepula | UD | 12 | 19 Feb 2000 | Carnival City, Brakpan, South Africa | For vacant WBO light-flyweight title |
| 63 | Win | 50–11–2 | Rafael Orozco | UD | 12 | 19 Dec 1998 | Miccosukee Indian Gaming Resort, Miami, Florida, U.S. | Retained IBA light-flyweight title |
| 62 | Win | 49–11–2 | Ric Magramo | PTS | 10 | 4 Jul 1998 | Carousel Casino, Hammanskraal, South Africa | |
| 61 | Win | 48–11–2 | Víctor Burgos | TD | 8 (12) | 20 Feb 1998 | Argosy Festival Atrium, Baton Rouge, Louisiana, U.S. | Retained IBA light-flyweight title; Majority TD |
| 60 | Win | 47–11–2 | Luis Doria | TKO | 12 (12) | 15 Nov 1997 | Carousel Casino, Hammanskraal, South Africa | Retained IBA light-flyweight title |
| 59 | Win | 46–11–2 | Michael Carbajal | TKO | 9 (12), 1:24 | 18 Jul 1997 | Thomas & Mack Center, Paradise, Nevada, U.S. | Won IBA light-flyweight title |
| 58 | Win | 45–11–2 | Mickey Cantwell | SD | 12 | 8 Feb 1997 | Arena, London, England | Retained WBO light-flyweight title |
| 57 | Win | 44–11–2 | Paul Weir | TKO | 10 (12), 1:55 | 13 Apr 1996 | Everton Park Sports Centre, Liverpool, England | Retained WBO light-flyweight title |
| 56 | Win | 43–11–2 | Paul Weir | TD | 5 (12), 2:36 | 18 Nov 1995 | Kelvin Hall, Glasgow, Scotland | Won WBO light-flyweight title; Unanimous TD: Weir unable to continue due to deep cut from accidental head-butt |
| 55 | Win | 42–11–2 | Francisco Mendoza | PTS | 8 | 26 Aug 1995 | Village Green, Durban, South Africa | |
| 54 | Draw | 41–11–2 | Sammy Stewart | SD | 10 | 6 May 1995 | Village Green, Durban, South Africa | |
| 53 | Loss | 41–11–1 | Alberto Jiménez | TKO | 8 (12), 2:35 | 11 Feb 1995 | Carousel Casino, Hammanskraal, South Africa | Lost WBO flyweight title |
| 52 | Win | 41–10–1 | Pretty Boy Lucas | UD | 12 | 15 Oct 1994 | Superbowl, Rustenburg, South Africa | Retained WBO flyweight title |
| 51 | Win | 40–10–1 | Francis Ampofo | RTD | 9 (12) | 11 Jun 1994 | York Hall, London, England | Retained WBO flyweight title |
| 50 | Win | 39–10–1 | Luigi Camputaro | RTD | 7 (12), 3:00 | 4 Dec 1993 | Superbowl, Rustenburg, South Africa | Retained WBO flyweight title |
| 49 | Win | 38–10–1 | Pablo Tiznado | UD | 10 | 24 Jul 1993 | Standard Bank Arena, Johannesburg, South Africa | |
| 48 | Win | 37–10–1 | Pat Clinton | TKO | 8 (12), 1:57 | 15 May 1993 | Scottish Exhibition Centre, Glasgow, Scotland | Won WBO flyweight title |
| 47 | Win | 36–10–1 | Toto Hleli | UD | 8 | 4 Apr 1993 | Indoor Centre, Springs, South Africa | |
| 46 | Win | 35–10–1 | Mzukisi Sikali | UD | 12 | 26 Apr 1992 | Nasrec Indoor Arena, Johannesburg, South Africa | Retained South African light-flyweight title |
| 45 | Win | 34–10–1 | Raúl Acosta | UD | 10 | 24 Nov 1991 | Nasrec Indoor Arena, Johannesburg, South Africa | |
| 44 | Loss | 33–10–1 | Dave McAuley | KO | 10 (12), 2:23 | 7 Sep 1991 | Maysfield Leisure Centre, Belfast, Northern Ireland | For IBF flyweight title |
| 43 | Win | 33–9–1 | Ndoda Mayende | TKO | 8 (12) | 23 Jun 1991 | Nasrec Indoor Arena, Johannesburg, South Africa | Retained South African light-flyweight title |
| 42 | Win | 32–9–1 | Zolile Mbityi | KO | 6 (12) | 10 Feb 1991 | Nasrec Indoor Arena, Johannesburg, South Africa | Retained South African light-flyweight title |
| 41 | Win | 31–9–1 | Wele Maqolo | SD | 12 | 28 Oct 1990 | Indoor Sports Centre, Uitenhage, South Africa | Won vacant South African light-flyweight title |
| 40 | Win | 30–9–1 | Ramón Solís | UD | 10 | 25 Mar 1990 | Don Mateman Hall, Johannesburg, South Africa | |
| 39 | Win | 29–9–1 | Sonnyboy Nghona | TKO | 2 (10) | 3 Dec 1989 | Indoor Sports Centee, Uitenhage, South Africa | |
| 38 | Win | 28–9–1 | Daniel Ward | UD | 10 | 15 Oct 1989 | Portuguese Hall, Johannesburg, South Africa | Won vacant Transvaal flyweight title |
| 37 | Win | 27–9–1 | Martín Cárdenas | UD | 10 | 14 Aug 1989 | Feather Market Hall, Port Elizabeth, South Africa | |
| 36 | Win | 26–9–1 | Odwa Mdleleni | KO | 6 (10) | 23 Jul 1989 | Good Hope Centre, Cape Town, South Africa | |
| 35 | Loss | 25–9–1 | Jaji Sibali | UD | 12 | 4 Jun 1989 | Orient Theatre, East London, South Africa | For South African flyweight title |
| 34 | Win | 25–8–1 | Ndoda Mayende | PTS | 8 | 14 May 1989 | Orient Theatre, East London, South Africa | |
| 33 | Win | 24–8–1 | Johannes Miya | RTD | 7 (10) | 5 Mar 1989 | Shareworld Sports Stadium, Johannesburg, South Africa | Won vacant Transvaal flyweight title |
| 32 | Loss | 23–8–1 | Vuyani Nene | UD | 12 | 16 Oct 1988 | Indoor Sports Centre, Uitenhage, South Africa | For South African light-flyweight title |
| 31 | Win | 23–7–1 | Daniel Ward | PTS | 8 | 9 Jul 1988 | Sports Stadium, Secunda, South Africa | |
| 30 | Win | 22–7–1 | Vumile Gomo | DQ | 7 (10) | 30 Apr 1988 | Great Centenary Hall, Port Elizabeth, South Africa | |
| 29 | Win | 21–7–1 | Jacob Mazubiko | TKO | 9 (10) | 7 Feb 1988 | Indoor Centre, Springs, South Africa | Won vacant Transvaal light-flyweight title |
| 28 | Loss | 20–7–1 | Vuyani Nene | PTS | 12 | 1 Nov 1987 | Centenary Hall, Port Elizabeth, South Africa | For South African light-flyweught title |
| 27 | Win | 20–6–1 | Kirk Morris | PTS | 8 | 2 Aug 1987 | Don Mateman Hall, Johannesburg, South Africa | |
| 26 | Loss | 19–6–1 | Vuyani Nene | RTD | 11 (12) | 15 Mar 1987 | Volkswagen Stadium, Uitenhage, South Africa | For South African light-flyweight title |
| 25 | Win | 19–5–1 | Pillay Duiker | PTS | 10 | 9 Nov 1986 | Modderfontein Arena, Johannesburg, South Africa | Won vacant Transvaal light-flyweight title |
| 24 | Loss | 18–5–1 | Vuyani Nene | PTS | 8 | 15 Mar 1986 | Feathermarket Hall, Port Elizabeth, South Africa | |
| 23 | Loss | 18–4–1 | Mveleli Luzipho | UD | 12 | 30 Nov 1985 | Mdantsane Stadium, East London, South Africa | For South African light-flyweight title |
| 22 | Win | 18–3–1 | Pillay Duiker | PTS | 10 | 21 Sep 1985 | Rand Stadium, Johannesburg, South Africa | Won Transvaal light-flyweight title |
| 21 | Win | 17–3–1 | Nqaba Govuza | TKO | 3 (8) | 18 May 1985 | Mdantsane Stadium, East London, South Africa | |
| 20 | Win | 16–3–1 | Gilbert Makenete | PTS | 6 | 1 Nov 1984 | Milner Park Showgrounds, Johannesburg, South Africa | |
| 19 | Win | 15–3–1 | Thamsanqa Sogcwe | PTS | 8 | 29 Sep 1984 | Centenary Hall, Port Elizabeth, South Africa | |
| 18 | Win | 14–3–1 | Jacob Mazibuko | PTS | 6 | 29 Jun 1984 | Vaal Showgrounds Hall, Vereeniging, South Africa | |
| 17 | Win | 13–3–1 | Juan Alberto Ivalo | UD | 10 | 25 May 1984 | Kwa Thema Civic Centre, Springs, South Africa | |
| 16 | Win | 12–3–1 | Solomon Manotsi | TKO | 4 (8) | 30 Mar 1984 | Mphatlalatsane Amphitheatre, Sebokeng, South Africa | |
| 15 | Win | 11–3–1 | Michael Mogopudi | RTD | 2 (8) | 2 Mar 1984 | Kwa Thema Civic Centre, Springs, South Africa | |
| 14 | Loss | 10–3–1 | Mveleli Luzipho | UD | 12 | 14 Oct 1983 | Orlando Stadium, Johannesburg, South Africa | Lost South African light-flyweight title |
| 13 | Win | 10–2–1 | José Antonio Badilla | TKO | 9 (10) | 19 Aug 1983 | Uncle Toms Hall, Johannesburg, South Africa | |
| 12 | Win | 9–2–1 | Martin Nkokoto | KO | 3 (12) | 13 May 1983 | Diepkloof Community Hall, Johannesburg, South Africa | Retained South African light-flyweight title |
| 11 | Win | 8–2–1 | Mveleli Luzipho | TKO | 11 (12) | 26 Feb 1983 | Mdantsane Stadium, East London, South Africa | Won South African light-flyweight title |
| 10 | Win | 7–2–1 | Kirk Morris | TKO | 7 (10) | 28 Jan 1983 | Diepkloof Community Hall, Johannesburg, South Africa | Retained Transvaal light-flyweight title |
| 9 | Win | 6–2–1 | Dexter Dlamini | TKO | 3 (6) | 4 Sep 1982 | Mphatlalatsane Amphitheatre, Sebokeng, South Africa | |
| 8 | Win | 5–2–1 | Simon Moema | TKO | 5 (10) | 9 Jul 1982 | Mphatlalatsane Amphitheatre, Sebokeng, South Africa | Won inaugural Transvaal light-flyweight title |
| 7 | Win | 4–2–1 | Michael Mogopudi | TKO | 5 (6) | 14 May 1982 | Diepkloof Community Hall, Johannesburg, South Africa | |
| 6 | Draw | 3–2–1 | Michael Mogopudi | PTS | 6 | 16 Apr 1982 | Mphatlalatsane Amphitheatre, Sebokeng, South Africa | |
| 5 | Win | 3–2 | Albert Moloto | PTS | 4 | 5 Mar 1982 | Mphatlalatsane Amphitheatre, Sebokeng, South Africa | |
| 4 | Win | 2–2 | Hansie Kruger | TKO | 3 (6) | 30 Oct 1981 | Diepkloof Community Hall, Johannesburg, South Africa | |
| 3 | Loss | 1–2 | Michael Mogopudi | PTS | 4 | 27 Jun 1981 | Mphatlalatsane Amphitheatre, Sebokeng, South Africa | |
| 2 | Loss | 1–1 | Kirk Morris | PTS | 4 | 5 Jun 1981 | Diepkloof Community Hall, Johannesburg, South Africa | |
| 1 | Win | 1–0 | Fraser Plaatjies | PTS | 4 | 2 Feb 1980 | Centenary Hall, Port Elizabeth, South Africa | |

== Trivia ==
At a height of 1.47 meters, or 4-foot-10, Matlala was the shortest boxing world champion ever. With a total of 68 fights (53 wins and 2 draws), he ended his career with 4 world championships. He presented his WBU belt to Nelson Mandela after his fight to Juan Herrera.

== See also ==
- List of flyweight boxing champions
- List of light-flyweight boxing champions

Sporting positions
World boxing titles
| Preceded by Pat Clinton | WBO flyweight champion 15 May 1993 – 11 February 1995 | Succeeded by Alberto Jiménez |
| Preceded by Paul Weir | WBO light-flyweight champion 18 November 1995 - 1997; Vacated | Vacant Title next held by Jesús Chong |
Records
| Preceded by Pascual Pérez & Netrnoi Sor Vorasingh; 4ft 11in | Shortest world champion 4ft 10in 15 May 1993 – present | Incumbent |
