= Paul Gonzales =

American boxer (born 1964)

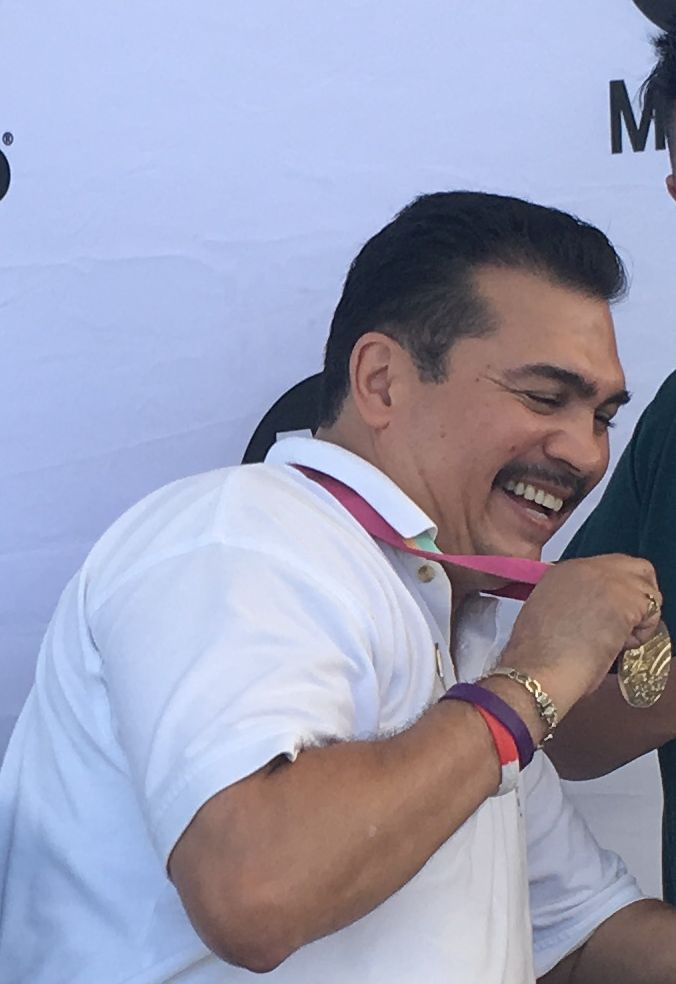
- Paul Gonzales in 2016

Personal information
- Full name: Paul Garza Gonzales
- Born: April 18, 1964 (age 62) Pecos, Texas, U.S.
Medal record
Men's boxing
Representing the United States
Olympic Games
Gold medal – first place	1984 Los Angeles	Light flyweight
Pan American Games
Silver medal – second place	1983 Caracas	Light flyweight

Paul Garza Gonzales (born April 18, 1964) is an American former professional boxer and convicted sex offender who won the light flyweight gold medal at the 1984 Summer Olympics.

== Amateur career ==
Gonzales was the winner of the Val Barker Trophy for Outstanding Boxer at those Games, after having won a silver medal the previous year at the 1983 Pan American Games.

=== Amateur highlights ===
- 1983 United States Amateur Light Flyweight Champion
- 1984 Olympic Light-Flyweight Gold Medalist at Los Angeles Games. Results were:
  - Defeated Kwang-Sun Kim (South Korea) 5-0
  - Defeated William Bagonza (Uganda) 5-0
  - Defeated John Lyon (Great Britain) 4-1
  - Defeated Marcelino Bolivar (Venezuela) 5-0
  - Defeated Salvatore Todisco (Italy) walk-over

== Professional career ==
Gonzales began his professional career on August 11, 1985 and, in only his third fight, captured the NABF Flyweight title by defeating veteran Alonzo Strongbow Gonzalez. He defended his title once, winning a unanimous decision over legendary future Bantamweight Champion Orlando Canizales on July 20, 1986. After losing a controversial decision to Ray Medel for the USBA Flyweight title on June 17, 1988, he again challenged Canizales. This time on June 10, 1990, and for Canizales' IBF Bantamweight belt. In the rematch, Gonzales was stopped by TKO in the 2nd round due to cuts. After two more losses against lackluster competition, Gonzales retired in 1991.

== Personal life ==
On Dec. 29, 2017, Gonzales was arrested on eight felony charges, including committing lewd acts with a child and possessing child pornography after being accused of molesting a 13-year-old girl and his 14-year-old niece. On Oct. 19, 2021, Gonzales pleaded no contest to charges of Lewd or lascivious acts with a child under 14 years of age, and Lewd or lascivious acts with a child 14 or 15 years of age and offender 10 or more years older than victim. He was sentenced to three years and eight months in prison and was released in 2023. Gonzales is a Level 1 sex offender and will have to remain on the sex offender registry for life. As of 2025, California's Megan's Law website lists him as living in Montebello, California.

Gonzales tried to run for office, but was defeated. He was a car salesman. Gonzales was the acting president of the Queensland Olympic Council.
