= Mustafa Genç =

Turkish boxer

Personal information
- Nationality: Turkish
- Born: 5 April 1954 (age 70)

Sport
- Sport: Boxing

Mustafa Genç (born 5 April 1954) is a Turkish boxer. He competed in the men's light flyweight event at the 1984 Summer Olympics. At the 1984 Summer Olympics, he lost to Carlos Motta of Guatemala.
