= Đặng Hiếu Hiền =

Vietnamese boxer (born 1966)

Ðặng Hiếu Hiền
Personal information
- Nationality: Vietnamese
- Born: 20 October 1966 (age 59) Diêu Trì township, Tuy Phước district, Bình Định
- Children: 2

Sport
- Sport: Boxing

Ðặng Hiếu Hiền (born 20 October 1966) is a Vietnamese boxing coach and former boxer.

== Early life ==
Đặng Hiếu Hiền was born on 20 October 1966, at Diêu Trì township, Tuy Phước district, Bình Định. However, Thanh Niên stated that he was born in 1965. When he was young, his father sent him to learn martial arts for self-defense. Hiền first entered traditional martial arts, later switched to freestyle martial arts.

== Career ==
In 1987, he was nominated as one of the ten notable Vietnamese athletes.

He competed in the men's light flyweight event at the 1988 Summer Olympics. He defeated a Spanish opponent in the first round. Hiền's miracle was repeated by Nguyễn Văn Đương in 2021, during 2020 Summer Olympics.

He retired in 1994, after an unrelated incident involving his 1988 Olympics teammate Đỗ Tiến Tuấn. After retirement, he has been involved in coaching since 2002.

== Personal life ==
Đặng Hiếu Hiền has three siblings, is married and has two daughters. He also has a passion of loving vintage Vespas.

Between 1994 and 2002, he worked as a bus boy for his family’s bus company.

One of his siblings, Đặng Hiếu Hân, won a gold medal in 1990 Vietnam National Games.
