= Keith Mwila =

Zambian boxer (1966–1993)

Medal record

Men's boxing

Representing Zambia

Olympic Games
Bronze medal – third place	1984 Los Angeles	Light Flyweight

Keith Mwila (November 1966 – 9 January 1993) was a Zambian boxer, who won the bronze medal in the men's Light flyweight (-48 kg) category at the 1984 Summer Olympics in Los Angeles, United States, becoming the first Olympic medalist from Zambia.

== Olympic results ==
- Round of 32: Bye
- Round of 16: Defeated Chung Pao Ming (Taiwan/Chinese Taipei) Referee stopped contest in second round
- Quarterfinal Defeated Mamoru Kuroiwa (Japan) by decision, 5-0
- Lost to Salvatore Todisco (Italy) by decision, 0-5 (was awarded bronze medal)
