= Agapito Gómez =

Spanish boxer

Agapito Gomez
Personal information
- Nationality: Spanish
- Born: Agapito Gomez Alvarez; 30 January 1963 (age 63) Parla, Madrid, Spain
- Weight: Bantamweight

Boxing career
- Stance: Orthodox

Boxing record
- Total fights: 20
- Wins: 17
- Win by KO: 6
- Losses: 3

Agapito Gómez Álvarez (born January 30, 1963) is a retired boxer from Spain, who represented his native country at the 1984 Summer Olympics in Los Angeles, California. Fighting in the light flyweight division (– 48 kg), he lost in the tournament's second round to Venezuela's Marcelino Bolivar.

== Olympic results ==
- Defeated Mahjoub Mjirich (Morocco) 3-2
- Lost to Marcelino Bolivar (Venezuela) 2-3
