= List of Puerto Rican boxing world champions =

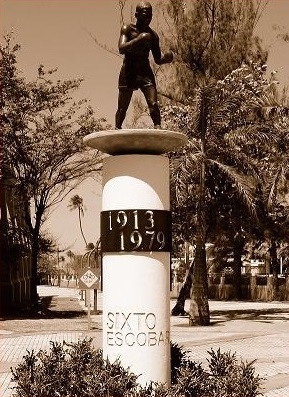
A statue of Sixto Escobar, found in the Estadio Sixto Escobar venue

In Puerto Rico, boxing is considered a major sport, having produced more amateur and professional world champions than any other sport in its history. Puerto Rico ranks 5th worldwide between countries with most boxing world champions in history (only behind USA, Mexico, UK and Japan). Also, in year 2004, became the first country to have had, at least, one world champion in every single one of the 17 current boxing weight divisions throughout the history (Provided that John Ruiz is considered as Puerto Rican and not counting Bridgerweight division). Puerto Rico ranks first in champions per capita with an astonishing 16 in every one million people. February 9, 2008 was the first time that boxers from Puerto Rico had held three of the four major welterweights titles (World Boxing Association, International Boxing Federation and World Boxing Organization) when Carlos Quintana defeated Paul Williams to join Miguel Cotto, and Kermit Cintron as champions in the division.

Individually, Puerto Rican world champions have earned numerous achievements. These include, Wilfredo Gómez's record for most defenses in the super bantamweight division (all 17 by KO) and for most knockouts in championship fights for the same organization title with 18. On March 6, 1976, at age 17, Wilfred Benítez became the youngest world champion in the history of the sport. On September 3, 1994, Daniel Jiménez established a world record for the quickest knockout in a championship fight, defeating Harald Geier in 17 seconds (currently the second fastest). Juan Manuel López is sixth in this category, having defeated César Figueroa in 47 seconds during his first defense. Ossie Ocasio was the first World Boxing Association (WBA) cruiserweight champion, winning it on February 13, 1982. This accomplishment was mimicked in other organizations: José de Jesús, José Ruíz Matos, John John Molina and Héctor Camacho did it in their respective divisions in the World Boxing Organization (WBO). On June 7, 2014, Miguel Cotto made history by becoming Puerto Rico's first four-division world champion. In women's boxing, Amanda Serrano was the first IBF super featherweight champion and the first Puerto Rican boxer (male or female) to win major world titles in seven different weight classes (Camacho made it first, but four of his titles were considered minor world titles). Also, in 2023, Serrano was the first Puerto Rican to be Undisputed world champion in a single division (featherweight), having won the four belts on each of the major boxing organizations (WBO, WBC, IBF and later WBA).

== Boxing in Puerto Rico ==
Boxing was introduced and practiced in a clandestine manner in Puerto Rico while the archipelago was still a Spanish colony. Fights were organized in haciendas among the workers of the sugar and coffee plantations, and the objective was to determine the best fighter among the employees. Following the culmination of the Puerto Rican Campaign and Spanish–American War, American soldiers who were stationed in the main island practiced the sport. During World War I, a championship known as Campeonato Las Casas was held as training for military personnel. Nero Chen, the first Puerto Rican boxer to gain recognition, began his career in these tournaments. The Combat Maneuver Training Center followed this example and organized boxing activities, which they named Los Campeones del Campamento. These were received with enthusiasm by the young recruits. Most of these events were celebrated without restriction due to military jurisdictional limits, although prohibitions were put in place for the civilian population. Illegal matches were organized on the rooftops of residences in Old San Juan, empty terrain's in El Condado and in hippodromes.

Outside of the island, legendary opera tenor Antonio Paoli, fell on economic hardship due to the closing of European opera houses during the first world war. He decided to change careers and entered a period of training making his boxing debut in London in 1916. Paoli won his first 5 fights but injured his wrist in his 6th bout, deciding to retire. The fact that a celebrity of his stature, who had been bestowed honors for his musical prowess by the pope, the Spanish monarchs and the Russian czar, would so quickly choose boxing as an alternate career shows how popular and deeply embedded in the culture of the island boxing was, even during its clandestine era.

By 1924, several young men were being taught to box by Gregario Rosa, a boxer who had won the featherweight championship of the Atlantic Fleet while serving in the Navy. Rosa established "Jack Dempsey Physical Culture and Boxing Club", a gym where he continued instructing more pugilists; however, the local police department would go in and arrest any boxer that participated in a card (organized boxing match). At times they were surprised to discover that several members of the law enforcement agencies and government were involved. In one case they discovered a group of police officers, including a colonel, two members of the governor's cabinet, numerous legislators and a judge at an event. The charges were archived; the decision was justified with a statement that said: "How will we have a boxing world champion if we don't let the boys learn how to box?"

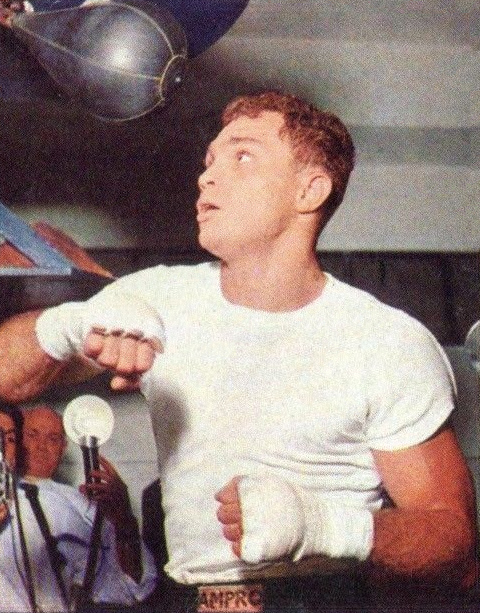
Carlos Ortíz is considered among the best Puerto Rican boxers of all time

In 1926, a boxing venue was opened in a military facility known as Cuartel de Ballajá; a fight card was organized weekly. Legislator Lorenzo Coballes Gandía redacted a proposal to legalize boxing, which was signed by governor Horace Mann Towner in May 1927. Consequently, the Primera Comisión Atlética de Boxeo (The First Athletic Boxing Commission) was created; this became the first organization dedicated to sanctioned boxing in Puerto Rico. Estadio Universal (Universal Stadium) became the first venue to organize legal boxing cards. The first event featured a fight between Enrique Chaffardet and Al Clemens as the main event, which was declared a draw by the judges. New stadiums were built in Bayamón, Caguas, Mayagüez, Ponce, Aguadilla and San Juan. The first Puerto Rican to win a world championship was Sixto Escobar, who won it on June 26, 1934. During the 1960s and 1970s, there was an increase in the number of pugilists who achieved this recognition. Including Wilfred Benítez who on March 6, 1976, became the youngest world champion in history at 17 years old. This tendency continued during the following two decades, reaching its peak between the 1980s and 1990s. There was a slight decline in the 1990s. Félix Trinidad was Puerto Rico's most notable champion during this period. The 2000s brought another increase, as over a dozen boxers won world championships.

Héctor García, Dommys Delgado Berty, Francisco Varcárcel and José Peñagaricano have served as presidents of the Puerto Rico Boxing Commission. This organization gained more prominence in 1985 when it received full control as the sanctioning body in any professional fight organized in Puerto Rico. In 2000, the commission's regulation was revised to exclude professional wrestling, which up to that point had been under its scope. This was Peñagaricano's first proposal on taking office, since he considered professional wrestling "a spectacle instead of a sport like boxing". During the following decades, the Puerto Rico Boxing Commission became the first governing body to have a female president when Delgado Berty served from 1986 to 1988. It became the first commission to require pre-fight weigh-ins, a measure that was at first criticized, but was later adopted by other boxing organizations. In 2007, David Bernier, then Secretary of Recreation and Sports, approved a new rule in the boxing organization's regulation that prohibited the signing of any pugilist younger than 18 years old as a professional. In 2011, women's boxing saw an increase in popularity, gaining mainstream attention. This was fueled by the championships won by Ada Veléz and Amanda Serrano, as well as Kiria Tapia becoming the first Pan American champion in her division.

== List of male world champions ==
- M Major Sanctioning Body
- U Undisputed World Championship
- L Lineal World Championship

Note: Interim World champions are included with an asterisk mark (*), waiting for Commission's and media recognition. Minor titles are excluded.

- indicates boxer of Puerto Rican heritage that is recognized by the commission due to parent's nationality, residence or other circumstances.
- indicates this is an Interim World Championship.

Number	Name	Date of first title win	Divisions	Successful defenses	References
1	Sixto Escobar	June 6, 1934	Bantamweight (U & L ^{2})	5 ^{[I]}	
2	Carlos Ortiz	June 12, 1959	Junior welterweight (U & L ^{2}) and lightweight (U & L ^{2})	2 and 9 ^{[II]}	
3	José Torres	March 30, 1965	Light heavyweight (U, M, M & L)	3 ^{[III]}	
4	Ángel Espada	June 28, 1975	Welterweight (M)	1 ^{[IV]}	
5	Alfredo Escalera	July 5, 1975	Super featherweight (M)	10 ^{[V]}	
6	Wilfred Benítez	March 6, 1976	Junior welterweight (M & L), welterweight (M & L) and junior middleweight (M)	2, 1 and 2 ^{[VI]}	
7	Esteban De Jesús	May 8, 1976	Lightweight (M)	3 ^{[VII]}	
8	Samuel Serrano	October 16, 1976	Super featherweight (M ^{2} & L ^{2})	14 ^{[VIII]}	
9	Wilfredo Gómez	May 21, 1977	Super bantamweight (M & L), featherweight (M) and super featherweight (M)	17, 0 and 0 ^{[IX]}	
10	Julian Solís	August 29, 1980	Bantamweight (M & L)	0 ^{[X]}	
11	Carlos De León	November 25, 1980	Cruiserweight (M ^{4} & L ^{2})	8 ^{[XI]}	
12	Ossie Ocasio	February 13, 1982	Cruiserweight (M)	3 ^{[XII]}	
13	Juan Laporte	September 15, 1982	Featherweight (M)	2 ^{[XIII]}	
14	Edwin Rosario	May 1, 1983	Lightweight (M & M ^{2}) and Junior welterweight (M)	3 and 0 ^{[XIV]}	
15	Héctor Camacho	August 7, 1983	Super featherweight (M), lightweight (M), junior welterweight (M^{2})	1, 2 and 2 ^{[XV]}	
16	Mark Medal	March 11, 1984	Junior middleweight (M)	0 ^{[XVI]}	
17	Harry Arroyo	April 15, 1984	Lightweight (M)	2 ^{[XVII]}	
18	Victor Callejas	May 26, 1984	Super bantamweight (M)	2 ^{[XVIII]}	
19	Carlos Santos	November 2, 1984	Junior middleweight (M)	1 ^{[XIX]}	
20	Antonio Rivera	August 30, 1986	Featherweight (M)	0 ^{[XX]}	
21	Wilfredo Vázquez	October 4, 1987	Bantamweight (M), super bantamweight (M) and featherweight (M)	1, 9 and 4 ^{[XXI]}	
22	José Ruíz Matos	April 29, 1989	Super flyweight (M)	4 ^{[XXII]}	
23	John John Molina	April 29, 1989	Super featherweight (M & M ^{2})	7 and 0 ^{[XXIII]}	
24	José de Jesús	May 19, 1989	Light flyweight (M)	3 ^{[XXIV]}	
25	Juan Nazario	April 4, 1990	Lightweight (M)	0 ^{[XXV]}	
26	Orlando Fernandez	May 12, 1990	Super bantamweight (M)	1 ^{[XXVI]}	
27	Rafael del Valle	May 13, 1992	Bantamweight (M)	2 ^{[XXVII]}	
28	Josué Camacho	July 31, 1992	Light flyweight (M)	1 ^{[XXVIII]}	
29	Daniel Jiménez	June 9, 1993	Bantamweight (M) and super bantamweight (M)	4 and 0 ^{[XXIX]}	
30	Félix Trinidad	June 19, 1993	Welterweight (M, M) and (L) junior middleweight (M & M) and middleweight (M)	15, 2 and 0 ^{[XXX]}	
31	Kevin Kelley	December 4, 1993	Featherweight (M)	7 ^{[XXXI]}	
32	Alex Sánchez	December 22, 1993	Mini flyweight (M)	6 ^{[XXXII]}	
33	Jake Rodríguez	February 13, 1994	Junior welterweight (M)	2 ^{[XXXIII]}	
34	Sammy Fuentes	June 10, 1995	Junior welterweight (IM & M)	2 ^{[XXXIV]}	
35	Lou Del Valle	September 20, 1997	Light heavyweight (M)	0 ^{[XXXV]}	
36	Daniel Santos	May 6, 2000	Welterweight (M) and junior middleweight (M & M)	2 and 4 ^{[XXXVI]}	
37	Nelson Dieppa	July 22, 2000	Light flyweight (M)	5 ^{[XXXVII]}	
38	Eric Morel	August 5, 2000	Flyweight (M)	5 ^{[XXXVIII]}	
39	John Ruiz	March 3, 2001	Heavyweight (M ^{2})	4 ^{[XXXIX]}	
40	Frank Toledo	April 6, 2001	Featherweight (M)	0 ^{[XL]}	
41	Iván Calderón	May 3, 2003	Mini flyweight (M) and light flyweight (M & L)	12 and 6 ^{[XLI]}	
42	José Antonio Rivera	September 13, 2003	Welterweight M) and junior middleweight (M)	0 and 0 ^{[XLII]}	
43	Manny Siaca	May 5, 2004	Super middleweight (M)	0 ^{[XLIII]}	
44	Miguel Cotto	September 11, 2004	Junior welterweight (M), welterweight (M & M) junior middleweight (M, M & M) & Middleweight (M & L)	5, 5, 2 and 1 ^{[XLIV]}	
45	Luis Collazo	April 2, 2005	Welterweight (M)	1 ^{[XLV]}	
46	Kermit Cintrón	October 28, 2006	Welterweight (M)	2 ^{[XLVI]}	
47	Carlos Quintana	February 9, 2008	Welterweight (M)	0 ^{[XLVII]}	
48	Juan Manuel López	June 7, 2008	Super bantamweight (M) and featherweight (M)	5 and 2 ^{[XLVIII]}	
49	Román Martínez	March 14, 2009	Super featherweight (M ^{3})	5 ^{[XLIX]}	
50	José López	March 28, 2009	Super flyweight (M)	0 ^{[L]}	
51	Wilfredo Vázquez, Jr.	February 27, 2010	Super bantamweight (M)	2 ^{[LI]}	
52	Danny García	July 30, 2010	Junior welterweight (M, M & L) and welterweight (M)	5 and 0 ^{[LII]}	
53	Rico Ramos	July 9, 2011	Super bantamweight (M)	0 ^{[LIII]}	
54	José Pedraza	March 22, 2014	Super featherweight (M) and lightweight (M)	2 and 0 ^{[LIV]}	
55	McJoe Arroyo	July 18, 2015	Super flyweight (M)	0 ^{[LV]}	
56	Jason Sosa	June 24, 2016	Super featherweight (M)	1 ^{[LVI]}	
57	Jesús Rojas	September 15, 2017	Featherweight (IM & M)	0 ^{[LVII]}	
58	Alberto Machado	October 21, 2017	Super featherweight (M)	2 ^{[LVIII]}	
59	Ángel Acosta	December 2, 2017	Light flyweight (M)	3 ^{[LIX]}	
60	Emmanuel Rodríguez	May 5, 2018	Bantamweight (M^{2})	1 ^{[LX]}	
61	Wilfredo Méndez	August 24, 2019	Mini flyweight (M)	2 ^{[LXI]}	
62	Shakur Stevenson	October 26, 2019	Featherweight (M), Super featherweight (M, M & L), Lightweight (M) and Junior welterweight (M & L)	0, 2 , 3 and 0 ^{[LXI]}	
(*)	McWilliams Arroyo	February 27, 2021	Flyweight (IM)	0 ^{[LXIII]}	
63	Jonathan Gonzalez	October 16, 2021	Light flyweight (M)	3 ^{[LXIV]}	
64	Subriel Matías	February 25, 2023	Junior welterweight (M & M)	1 and 0 ^{[LXV]}	
65	Oscar Collazo	May 27, 2023	Mini flyweight (M, M & L)	7 ^{[LXVI]}	
66	René Santiago	March 13, 2025	Light flyweight (IM, M & M)	1 ^{[LXVII]}	
67	Antonio Vargas	December 13, 2024	Bantamweight (IM & M)	1 ^{[LXVIII]}	
68	Xander Zayas	July 26, 2025	Junior middleweight (M & M)	1 ^{[LXVIV]}	

== List of female world champions ==
Number	Name	Date of first title win	Divisions	Successful defenses	References
1	Melissa Del Valle	September 12, 1998	Super featherweight (M) and super bantamweight (M)	1 and 0 ^{[A]}	
2	Ada Vélez	January 19, 2001	Bantamweight (M ^{2}) and super bantamweight (M ^{2} & M)	1 and 1 ^{[B]}	
3	Melissa Hernández	November 4, 2006	Super bantamweight (M) & M), super featherweight (M) and featherweight (M)	0, 0, 0 and 0 ^{[C]}	
4	Amanda Serrano	September 10, 2011	Super featherweight (M), lightweight (M), featherweight (M), junior featherweight (M), bantamweight (M), junior welterweight (M) and junior bantamweight (M)	0, 0, 10, 2, 0, 0 and 0 ^{[D]}	
5	Cindy Serrano	December 10, 2016	Featherweight (M)	1	
(*)	Stephanie Piñeiro	September 12, 2025	Welterweight (IM)	1	

== Current titleholders ==
=== Men ===
Name	Organization	Division	Date won	Record	Defenses
Oscar Collazo	WBA Super/The Ring	Mini flyweight	May 27, 2023	15–0 (12 KO)	7
Shakur Stevenson	WBO/The Ring	Junior welterweight	January 26, 2026	25–0 (11 KO)	0
René Santiago	WBO/WBA In recess	Light flyweight	March 13, 2025	16-4 (9 KO)	2

=== Women ===
Name	Organization	Division	Date won	Record	Defenses
Amanda Serrano	WBO/WBA	Featherweight	September 13, 2019	50–4–1 (32 KO)	10

== International Boxing Hall of Fame ==
Puerto Ricans in the International Boxing Hall of Fame

Number	Name	Year inducted	Notes
1	Carlos Ortíz	1991	World Jr. Welterweight Champion 1959 June 12- 1960, September 1, WBA Lightweight Champion 1962 Apr 21 – 1965 Apr 10, WBC Lightweight Champion 1963 Apr 7 – 1965 Apr 10, WBC Lightweight Champion 1965 Nov 13 – 1968 Jun 29.
2	Wilfred Benítez	1994	The youngest world champion in boxing history. WBA Light Welterweight Champion 1976 Mar 6 – 1977, WBC Welterweight Champion 1979 Jan 14 – 1979 Nov 30, WBC Light Middleweight Champion.
3	Wilfredo Gómez	1995	WBC Super Bantamweight Champion 1977 May 21 – 1983, WBC Featherweight Champion 1984 Mar 31 – 1984 Dec 8, WBA Super Featherweight Champion 1985 May 19 – 1986 May 24.
4	José "Chegui" Torres	1997	Won a silver medal in the junior middleweight at the 1956 Olympic Games. Undisputed Light Heavyweight Champion 1965 Mar 30 – 1966 Dec 16
5	Sixto Escobar	2002	Puerto Rico's first boxing champion. World Bantamweight Champion 15 Nov 1935– 23 Sep 1937, World Bantamweight Champion 20 Feb 1938– Oct 1939
6	Edwin Rosario	2006	Ranks #36 on the list of "100 Greatest Punchers of All Time." according to Ring Magazine. WBC Lightweight Champion 1983 May 1 – 1984 Nov 3, WBA Lightweight Champion 1986 Sep 26 – 1987 Nov 21, WBA Lightweight Champion 199 Jul 9 – 1990 Apr 4, WBA Light Welterweight Champion 1991 Jun 14 – 1992 Apr 10.
7	Pedro Montañez	2007	92 wins out of 103 fights. Never held a title.
8	Joe Cortez	2011	The first Puerto Rican boxing referee to be inducted into the Boxing Hall of Fame
9	Herbert "Cocoa Kid" Hardwick	2012	Member of boxing's "Black Murderers' Row". World Colored Welterweight Championship - June 11, 1937 to August 22, 1938; World Colored Middleweight Championship - January 11, 1940 until the title went extinct in the 1940s; World Colored Middleweight Championship - January 15, 1943 until the title went extinct in the 1940s
10	Félix "Tito" Trinidad	2014	Captured the IBF welterweight crown in his 20th pro bout. Won the WBA light middleweight title from David Reid in March 2000 and later that year unified titles with a 12th-round knockout against IBF champ Fernando Vargas. In 2001 became a three-division champion.
11	Héctor "Macho" Camacho	2016	First boxer to be recognized as a septuple champion in history (counting championships from minor sanctioning bodies). WBC Super Featherweight Championship - August 7, 1983 – 1984, WBC Lightweight Championship - August 10, 1985 – 1987, WBO Light Welterweight Champion - March 6, 1989 – February 23, 1991, WBO Light Welterweight Champion - May 18, 1991–1992.
12	Mario Rivera Martino	2019	First Puerto Rican boxing sports writer to be inducted into the International Boxing Hall of Fame. He served Puerto Rican boxing for more than 50 years as a writer and eventual commissioner.
13	Miguel Cotto	2022	He is a multiple-time world champion, and the first Puerto Rican boxer to win world titles in four weight classes, from light welterweight to middleweight. In 2007 and 2009,

= Indicates the person is no longer alive

== See also ==
- Sport in Puerto Rico
- List of current world boxing champions
- List of boxing triple champions
- List of boxing quadruple champions
- List of boxing quintuple champions
- List of boxing sextuple champions
- List of WBC world champions
- List of WBA world champions
- List of IBF world champions
- List of WBO world champions
- List of IBO world champions
- Septuple Champion
- Boxing in Puerto Rico

== Notes ==
=== Men's titlists ===
I:Sixto Escobar at BoxRec (registration required)
II:Carlos Ortiz at BoxRec (registration required)
III:Jose Torres at BoxRec (registration required)
IV:Angel Espada at BoxRec (registration required)
V:Alfredo Escalera at BoxRec (registration required)
VI:Wilfred Benitez at BoxRec (registration required)
VII:Esteban De Jesus at BoxRec (registration required)
VIII:Samuel Serrano at BoxRec (registration required)
IX:Wilfredo Gomez at BoxRec (registration required)
X:Julian Solis at BoxRec (registration required)
XI:Carlos De Leon at BoxRec (registration required)
XII:Ossie Ocasio at BoxRec (registration required)
XIII:Juan La Porte at BoxRec (registration required)
XIV:Edwin Rosario at BoxRec (registration required)
XV:Hector Camacho at BoxRec (registration required)
XVI:Mark Medal at BoxRec (registration required)
XVII:Harry Arroyo at BoxRec (registration required)
XVIII:Victor Callejas at BoxRec (registration required)
XIX:Carlos Santos at BoxRec (registration required)
XX:Antonio Rivera at BoxRec (registration required)
XXI:Wilfredo Vazquez at BoxRec (registration required)
XXII:Jose Ruiz at BoxRec (registration required)
XXIII:John John Molina at BoxRec (registration required)
XXIV:Jose De Jesus at BoxRec (registration required)
XXV:Juan Nazario at BoxRec (registration required)
XXVI:Orlando Fernandez at BoxRec (registration required)
XXVII:Rafael Del Valle at BoxRec (registration required)
XXVIII:Josue Camacho at BoxRec (registration required)
XXIX:Daniel Jimenez at BoxRec (registration required)
XXX:Felix Trinidad at BoxRec (registration required)
XXXI:Kevin Kelley at BoxRec (registration required)
XXXII:Alex Sanchez at BoxRec (registration required)
XXXIII:Jake Rodriguez at BoxRec (registration required)
XXXIV:Sammy Fuentes at BoxRec (registration required)
XXXV:Lou Del Valle at BoxRec (registration required)
XXXVI:Daniel Santos at BoxRec (registration required)
XXXVII:Nelson Dieppa at BoxRec (registration required)
XXXVIII:Eric Morel at BoxRec (registration required)
XXXIX:John Ruiz at BoxRec (registration required)
XL:Frank Toledo at BoxRec (registration required)
XLI:Ivan Calderon at BoxRec (registration required)
XLII:Jose Antonio Rivera at BoxRec (registration required)
XLIII:Manny Siaca at BoxRec (registration required)
XLIV:Miguel Cotto at BoxRec (registration required)
XLV:Luis Collazo at BoxRec (registration required)
XLVI:Kermit Cintron at BoxRec (registration required)
XLVII:Carlos Quintana at BoxRec (registration required)
XLVIII:Juan Manuel Lopez at BoxRec (registration required)
XLIX:Roman Martinez at BoxRec (registration required)
L:Jose Lopez at BoxRec (registration required)
LI:Wilfredo Vazquez Jr at BoxRec (registration required)
LII:Danny Garcia at BoxRec (registration required)
LIII:Rico Ramos at BoxRec (registration required)
LIV:Jose Pedraza at BoxRec (registration required)
LV:McJoe Arroyo at BoxRec (registration required)
LVI:Jason Sosa at BoxRec (registration required)
LVII:Jesus Rojas at BoxRec (registration required)
LVIII:Alberto Machado at BoxRec (registration required)
LIX:Angel Acosta at BoxRec (registration required)
LX:Emmanuel Rodriguez at BoxRec (registration required)
LXI:Wilfredo Mendez at BoxRec (registration required)
LXII:Shakur Stevenson at BoxRec (registration required)
LXIII:McWilliams Arroyo at BoxRec (registration required)
LXIV:Jonathan Gonzalez at BoxRec (registration required)

=== Women's titlists ===
A:Melissa Del Valle at BoxRec (registration required)
B:Ada Velez at BoxRec (registration required)
C:Melissa Hernandez at BoxRec (registration required)
D:Amanda Serrano at BoxRec (registration required)
