= Maurice Maina =

Kenyan boxer (born 1963)

Personal information
- Nationality: Kenyan
- Born: 1 January 1963 (age 62)

Sport
- Sport: Boxing

Maurice Maina (born 1 January 1963) is a Kenyan boxer. He competed in the men's light flyweight event at the 1988 Summer Olympics.
