= Francisco Tejedor =

Colombian boxer (born 1966)

Personal information
- Nickname: La Araña
- Nationality: Colombian
- Born: Francisco Tejedor; June 20, 1966 (age 60) Barranquilla, Colombia
- Height: 5 ft 6 1/2 in (169 cm)
- Weight: Light flyweight; Flyweight; Bantamweight; Super bantamweight

Boxing career
- Reach: 74 in (188 cm)
- Stance: Orthodox

Boxing record
- Total fights: 69
- Wins: 46
- Win by KO: 31
- Losses: 21
- Draws: 2

Francisco Tejedor (born June 20, 1966) is a retired Colombian boxer. He competed in the men's light flyweight event at the 1984 Summer Olympics.

== Professional career ==
He turned professional in 1986 and won 28 consecutive fights before unsuccessfully challenging Humberto González for the WBC light flyweight title. Tejedor would work his way back to another title shot and on February 18, 1995 he beat José Luis Zepeda for the vacant IBF world title by way of 7th-round TKO. He would go on to lose the belt in his first title defense to Danny Romero in April of the same year. He lost his final 10 fights and retired from the sport in 2004.

== See also ==
- List of flyweight boxing champions

Achievements
Vacant Title last held by Pichit Sitbangprachan	IBF flyweight champion February 18, 1995 – April 22, 1995	Succeeded by Danny Romero
