= Chung Pao-ming =

Taiwanese boxer

Personal information
- Full name: 鍾 保明, Pinyin: Zhōng Bǎo-míng
- Nationality: Taiwanese
- Born: 13 December 1961 (age 63)

Sport
- Sport: Boxing

Chung Pao-ming (born 13 December 1961) is a Taiwanese boxer. He competed in the men's light flyweight event at the 1984 Summer Olympics. At the 1984 Summer Olympics, he lost to Keith Mwila of Zambia.
