= Henry Martínez (boxer) =

Salvadoran boxer (born 1971)

Henry ("Donald") Martínez (born January 20, 1971, in San Salvador) is a retired bantamweight boxer from El Salvador, who represented his native country at the 1988 Summer Olympics in Seoul, South Korea.

== Olympic results ==
Below is the record of Henry Martínez, an El Salvadorian light flyweight boxer who competed at the 1988 Seoul Olympics:

- Round of 64: Defeated Yacine Cheikh (Algeria) by decision, 5–0
- Round of 32: Defeated Yehuda Ben-Haim (Israel) by walkover
- Round of 16: Lost to Ivailo Khristov (Bulgaria) by decision, 0–5

== Pro career ==
He made his professional debut on January 26, 1990. After nineteen professional bouts (16–2–1) Martínez retired from boxing after being defeated by US boxer Johnny Tapia in the fight for the vacant World Boxing Organization super flyweight title on October 12, 1994.
