= José Ruíz Matos =

Puerto Rican boxer (1966–1997)

Personal information
- Nickname: Cheito
- Born: October 24, 1966 Trujillo Alto, Puerto Rico
- Died: February 28, 1997 (aged 30) San Juan, Puerto Rico
- Weight: Super flyweight

Boxing career
- Stance: Orthodox

Boxing record
- Total fights: 26
- Wins: 22
- Win by KO: 9
- Losses: 4

José "Cheíto" Ruíz Matos (October 24, 1966 – February 28, 1997) was a Puerto Rican boxer. Born and raised in the municipality of Trujillo Alto, he was signed as a professional when he was 17 years old. Ruíz made his debut July 13, 1984, competing in the super flyweight division. He gathered a record of 9-2 during the first three years of his career, which featured a trilogy against eventual contender, Pedro Jose Feliciano. Seeking to improve his standing in the world rankings, Ruíz challenged and defeated former World Boxing Council and Colombian champion, Prudencio Cardona and Chilean titlist Bernardo Manuel Mendoza. On April 29, 1989, he received his first opportunity for a world championship, defeating Sugar "Baby" Rojas for the title of the newly created World Boxing Organization. Ruíz had four successful defenses, defeating Juan Carazo, Ángel Rosario, Wilfredo Vargas and Armando Velasco. On February 22, 1992, Ruíz lost the title to José Quirino by unanimous decision. Five months later, he participated in the last fight of his career, losing a close majority decision to the International Boxing Federation's champion, Robert Quiroga. On February 28, 1997, Ruíz was ambushed and shot while traveling through one of San Juan's barrios, receiving six bullet wounds that fatally injured him.

== Youth and early professional career ==
José Ruíz was born in the municipality of Trujillo Alto, to José Ramón Ruíz and Rosa Matos de Jesús. By the time that Ruíz reached 17 years of age, he was already married to Gloria Esther Conde. On July 5, 1984, the pugilist signed his first professional contract, being managed by Lilliamery Valentín Conde, who presented the official documentation before the Puerto Rico Boxing Commission. Ruíz's career was subsequently managed by Video Deportes, a company owned by businesswoman Ivonne Class. When he was 18 years old, Ruiz debuted as a professional, competing in the super flyweight division. Early in his career, the boxer trained exclusively with Pedro Cobé. In his first fight, which took place on July 13, 1984, he defeated Elias Cruz by decision in a four-round fight. Less than two months after his debut, Ruíz participated in his first contest held in the capital of Puerto Rico, San Juan. There he was booked against Marcos Roldan, winning by points. A month later, he fought in a card held at Aguadilla, a municipality located in the northwestern tip of the archipelago's main island. In this contest, Ruíz won his third consecutive fight, defeating Luis Monzote by points. On February 23, 1985, Ruíz recorded his first defeat, losing by decision to Pedro José Feliciano, who was debuting. Ruíz returned to action less than three months after, scoring a points victory over José Vega. The following month, he was active in an event held at Hiram Bithorn Stadium, where he defeated Victor Cruz. After more than five months of inactivity, Ruíz fought in his native Trujillo Alto, scoring the first knockout victory of his career over Marcos Claudio. This was followed by a rematch against Feliciano, whom he defeated by points in a ten-round contest. Ruíz the challenged then contender and former Continental Americas light flyweight champion, José "Cagüitas" de Jesús, losing a unanimous decision. On August 8, 1987, Ruíz fought Feliciano in a rubber match, winning by points. He closed the year performing in another major venue, Roberto Clemente Coliseum, where he defeated Angel Rosario by unanimous decision.

As was common during that time, the pugilist experienced differences with the promotion managing his career, which was a recurrent issue among the boxing business. Consequently, Ruíz pursued legal advice before the Puerto Rico Boxing Commission, forcing the cancellation of his contract with Héctor Avilés. Regardless of the issue surrounding the promotion of his career, Ruíz gained notoriety based on his skill set. Consequently, four years after his professional debut, Ruíz began pursuing opponents featuring better standing within the world rankings, expecting to eventually receive an opportunity for a world championship. In order to reach this goal, he studied several defensive tactics which he intended to use in combination with his physical strength to overcome his opponents. Ruíz began that year by fighting former World Boxing Council and Colombian flyweight champion, Prudencio Cardona, whom he defeated by knockout in nine rounds. The following month, he defeated Rosario by decision in Guaynabo. On November 3, 1988, Ruíz fought former Chilean super flyweight and the incumbent Chilean bantamweight champion, Bernardo Manuel Mendoza, defeating him by technical decision in five rounds.

== Super flyweight championship ==
On April 29, 1989, Ruíz fought Sugar "Baby" Rojas to determine the first super flyweight champion of the newly created World Boxing Organization. Rojas from Colombia was a former WBC champion and entered the fight with a record of 31-2. Despite his opponent's experience advantage, Ruíz began the offensive by using his speed to land body punches, gaining control of the fight's tempo. In the fourth round, Rojas was injured by several punches to the head, supporting himself against the ropes. Ruíz subsequently began changing his stance to southpaw, using this strategy to open a cut below his opponent's left eye. This style frustrated Rojas, who protested that Ruíz was not engaging in the offensive. This frustration was also expressed against the referee, Stanley Christodoulou, who warned him during the fight. When the contest concluded, the judges awarded Ruíz scores of 117-114, 119-112, and 117-116. This was part of a card that also featured a fight between John John Molina and Juan Laporte. In his first defense, Ruíz defeated Juan "Curie" Carazo by knockout in the first round. On October 21, 1989, he defeated Ángel "Cuso" Rosario by knockout in the twelfth round. Ruíz closed the year by defeating Marcos Claudio in one round. On May 12, 1990, he defeated Richard Picardo in a non-titular contest held in Italy. In his third title defense, Ruíz defeated Wilfredo Vargas by knockout in eight rounds at Juan Pachín Vicéns Auditorium. On November 3, 1990, he traveled to Mexico and defeated local pugilist, Armando Velasco, by unanimous decision. Following this defense, the Puerto Rico Boxing Commission suggested that the WBC should rank Ruíz among the top ten contenders in their ranking, but this request was declined because he held another championship. A fight against Ellyas Pical was proposed for December 20, 1990, but was never organized. Ruíz was expected to be competing in bigger fights shortly, but a unanimous decision loss against José Quirino halted his progress. This loss discarded a planned fight against Scott Olson. The judges gave scores of 112-116, 11-116 and 112-115 for Quirino. Prior to this fight, Freddy Trinidad was incorporated as part of the pugilist's team. Ruíz justified this defeat by claiming that he had over trained, opening a two-month camp instead of the usual 20 days. His next opponent was the IBF super flyweight champion, Robert Quiroga, who won a close majority decision with scores of 114-114 and 113-114 twice. Ruíz was able to score a knockdown in the third round of this contest. Quiroga was originally scheduled to fight another Puerto Rican, Rafael "Baby" Cabán, who had to withdraw because of injury, opening the space to Ruíz. The card which was originally supposed to take place on June 9, 1992, was postponed and ended being held a month later in Las Vegas. Because of the close decision, Ruíz pursued a rematch, receiving support from the president of the IBF's Championship Committee, Bill Brennan.

== Professional boxing record ==
26 fights	22 wins	4 losses
By knockout	9	0
By decision	13	4

No.	Result	Record	Opponent	Type	Round, time	Date	Location	Notes
26	Loss	22–4	Robert Quiroga	MD	12 (12)	1992-07-11	The Aladdin, Paradise, Nevada, U.S.	For IBF super-flyweight title
25	Loss	22–3	José Quirino	UD	12 (12)	1992-02-22	The Aladdin, Paradise, Nevada, U.S.	Lost WBO super-flyweight title
24	Win	22–2	Luis Monzote	KO	3 (10)	1991-09-06	Convention Center, Miami Beach, Florida, U.S.	
23	Win	21–2	Wilfredo Vargas	PTS	10 (10)	1991-06-10	San Juan, Puerto Rico	
22	Win	20–2	Marcos Gomez	KO	6 (10)	1991-05-01	Caribe Hilton Hotel, San Juan, Puerto Rico	
21	Win	19–2	Armando Velasco	UD	12 (12)	1990-11-03	Centro Internacional Acapulco, Acapulco, Mexico	Retained WBO super-flyweight title
20	Win	18–2	Wilfredo Vargas	TKO	8 (12)	1990-08-18	Auditorio Juan Pachín Vicéns, Ponce, Puerto Rico	Retained WBO super-flyweight title
19	Win	17–2	Richard Picardo	KO	1 (?)	1990-05-12	Sassari Arena, Sassari, Italy	
18	Win	16–2	Marcos Claudio	KO	1 (?)	1989-12-15	Yabucoa, Puerto Rico	
17	Win	15–2	Angel Rosario	TKO	12 (12)	1989-10-21	San Juan, Puerto Rico	Retained WBO super-flyweight title
16	Win	14–2	Juan Carazo	TKO	1 (12)	1989-09-09	Roberto Clemente Coliseum, San Juan, Puerto Rico	Retained WBO super-flyweight title
15	Win	13–2	Sugar Baby Rojas	UD	12 (12)	1989-04-29	Roberto Clemente Coliseum, San Juan, Puerto Rico	Won inaugural WBO super-flyweight title
14	Win	12–2	Bernardo Mendoza	TD	5 (?)	1988-11-03	Trujillo Alto, Puerto Rico	
13	Win	11–2	Angel Rosario	PTS	10 (10)	1988-08-27	Guaynabo, Puerto Rico	
12	Win	10–2	Prudencio Cardona	KO	9 (?)	1988-07-11	San Juan, Puerto Rico	
11	Win	9–2	Angel Rosario	PTS	10 (10)	1987-11-28	Roberto Clemente Coliseum, San Juan, Puerto Rico	
10	Win	8–2	Pedro Jose Feliciano	PTS	10 (10)	1987-08-08	El San Juan Hotel & Casino, San Juan, Puerto Rico	
9	Loss	7–2	José de Jesús	PTS	10 (10)	1987-04-25	San Juan, Puerto Rico	
8	Win	7–1	Pedro Jose Feliciano	PTS	10 (10)	1987-03-14	San Juan, Puerto Rico	
7	Win	6–1	Marcos Claudio	KO	1 (?)	1986-12-04	Trujillo Alto, Puerto Rico	
6	Win	5–1	Victor Cruz	PTS	4 (4)	1986-06-22	Hiram Bithorn Stadium, San Juan, Puerto Rico	
5	Win	4–1	Jose Vega	PTS	4 (4)	1986-05-03	Guaynabo, Puerto Rico	
4	Loss	3–1	Pedro Jose Feliciano	SD	4 (4)	1985-02-23	Hato Rey, Puerto Rico	
3	Win	3–0	Luis Monzote	PTS	4 (4)	1984-10-11	Aguadilla, Puerto Rico	
2	Win	2–0	Marcos Roldan	PTS	4 (4)	1984-09-06	Coliseo Pedrín Zorrilla, Hato Rey, Puerto Rico	
1	Win	1–0	Elias Cruz	PTS	4 (4)	1984-07-13	Trujillo Alto, Puerto Rico	

== Death and legacy ==
On February 28, 1997, before he was able to make a rematch official, Ruíz was shot and murdered in one of San Juan's barrios. At the moment of his death, he was 30 years old . Domingo Álvarez, the coroner that attended the scene, noted that the pugilist's body displayed six bullets wounds that presumably caused his death instantly. According to the official report filed by Álvarez, Ruíz was exiting Villas de Lomas Verdes, a condominium in the district of Cupey, in his vehicle, when two unknown assailants approached the vehicle on foot and opened fire at close range, subsequently fleeing the scene. No motives were disclosed for the murder. However, José "Toto" Peñagarícano, former president of the Puerto Rico Boxing Commission subsequently stated that Ruíz was murdered because he supposedly had a relationship with the girlfriend of an unidentified drug lord. After an extensive trial, judge José Torres Caraballo sentenced two culprits for the murder. Ruíz was survived by eight daughters.

== See also ==
- Boxing in Puerto Rico
- List of Puerto Rican boxing world champions
- List of world super-flyweight boxing champions

== Bibliography ==
- Marvin Fonseca Barahona (2007). Puerto Rico: Cuna de Campeones (in Spanish). Puerto Rico. ISBN 978-1-60643-254-9.

Sporting positions
World boxing titles
Inaugural champion	WBO super-flyweight champion April 29, 1989 – February 22, 1992	Succeeded by José Quirino
Status
Preceded by Elvis Álvarez	Latest born world champion to die February 28, 1997 – June 14, 2002	Succeeded by José Bonilla
