= Carlos Eluaiza =

Argentine boxer (born 1965)

Carlos Mario Eluaiza (born June 5, 1965 in Las Flores, Buenos Aires) is a former flyweight boxer from Argentina, who represented his native country at the 1988 Summer Olympics in Seoul. There he was eliminated in the second round by USSR's Alexander Makhmutov. Nicknamed El Zurdo and El Vasco, Eluaiza made his professional debut on February 10, 1989. Ten years later he retired, after 27 fights: twenty wins (four ko's) and seven losses.
