= Paul Weir =

Scottish boxer

Personal information
- Nickname: The Mighty Atom
- Born: Paul Weir; 16 September 1967 (age 59) Glasgow, Scotland
- Height: 5 ft 3 in (160 cm)
- Weight: Mini-flyweight; Light-flyweight; Flyweight

Boxing career
- Weight class: Mini Fly Weight, Light Fly Weight, Fly Weight

Boxing record
- Total fights: 20
- Wins: 14
- Win by KO: 4
- Losses: 6
Medal record
Boxing
Representing Scotland
European Championships
Bronze medal – third place	1991 Gothenburg	Light flyweight

Paul Weir (born 16 September 1967) is a Scottish former professional boxer who competed from 1992 to 2000. He was a world champion in two weight classes, having held the WBO mini-flyweight title in 1993 and the WBO junior-flyweight title from 1994 to 1995.

== Professional boxing career ==
Weir turned professional in 1992 and captured the vacant WBO mini-flyweight title in his sixth professional fight, with a TKO win over Fernando Martínez in 1993. He defended the belt once against Lindi Memani and relinquished the belt before moving up in weight to challenge Josue Camacho for the WBO junior-flyweight title. He lost the bout, but Camacho vacated the belt and he defeated Paul Oulden for the vacant WBO junior-flyweight title in 1994. He defended the belt once against Ric Magramo before losing it to Jacob Matlala after Weir was unable to continue due to a deep cut from an accidental headbutt in the fifth round. They rematched the following year and Weir lost via TKO in the tenth.

In 2010, Weir returned to boxing as a trainer. Weir's fighters include Craig Docherty, Derry Mathews, and John Simpson.

In 2022 he received the BJJ Black Belt at Entropy Jiu Jitsu from Professor Thabet Al Taher.

== Professional boxing record ==
20 fights	14 wins	6 losses
By knockout	4	3
By decision	10	3

No.	Result	Record	Opponent	Type	Round	Date	Location	Notes
20	Loss	14–6	Stevie Quinn	PTS	4	11 Nov 2000	Waterfront Hall, Belfast, Northern Island	
19	Win	14–5	Delroy Spencer	PTS	8	30 Sep 2000	Prince Regent Hotel, Chigwell, England	
18	Loss	13–5	Alfonso Zvenyika Lambarda	TKO	11 (12)	26 Jan 1998	St Andrew's SC, Forte Crest Hotel, Glasgow, Scotland	For vacant CBC flyweight title
17	Loss	13–4	Jesper Jensen	TKO	8 (12)	2 May 1997	Randers Hall, Randers, Denmark	For EBU flyweight title
16	Win	13–3	Anthony Hanna	PTS	8	28 Feb 1997	Grand Hall, Kilmarnock, Scotland	
15	Win	12–3	Lyndon Kershaw	PTS	6	11 Oct 1996	Hilton Hotel, Mayfair, England	
14	Win	11–3	Louis Veitch	KO	1 (8)	3 Jun 1996	St Andrew's Sporting Club, Glasgow, Scotland	
13	Loss	10–3	Jacob Matlala	TKO	10 (12), 1:55	13 Apr 1996	Everton Park Sports Centre, Liverpool, England	For WBO junior-flyweight title
12	Loss	10–2	Jacob Matlala	TD	5 (12), 2:36	18 Nov 1995	Kelvin Hall, Glasgow, Scotland	Lost WBO junior-flyweight title
11	Win	10–1	Jose Luis Velarde	PTS	10	29 Jul 1995	Ice Rink, Whitley Bay, England	
10	Win	9–1	Ric Magramo	UD	12	5 Apr 1995	Magnum Centre, Irvine, Scotland	Retained WBO junior-flyweight title
9	Win	8–1	Paul Oulden	UD	12	23 Nov 1994	Magnum Centre, Irvine, Scotland	Won vacant WBO junior-flyweight title
8	Loss	7–1	Josué Camacho	UD	12	2 Feb 1994	Kelvin Hall, Glasgow, Scotland	For WBO junior-flyweight title
7	Win	7–0	Lindi Memani	UD	12	25 Oct 1993	St Andrew's Sporting Club, Glasgow, Scotland	Retained WBO mini-flyweight title
6	Win	6–0	Fernando Martínez	TKO	7 (12), 1:28	15 May 1993	Scottish Exhibition Centre, Glasgow, Scotland	Won vacant WBO mini-flyweight title
5	Win	5–0	Kevin Jenkins	PTS	8	6 Mar 1993	St Andrew's Sporting Club, Glasgow, Scotland	
4	Win	4–0	Shaun Norman	PTS	8	23 Nov 1992	St Andrew's Sporting Club, Glasgow, Scotland	
3	Win	3–0	Neil Parry	TKO	4 (8)	21 Sep 1992	St Andrew's Sporting Club, Glasgow, Scotland	
2	Win	2–0	Louis Veitch	PTS	6	9 Jul 1992	Scottish Exhibition Centre, Glasgow, Scotland	
1	Win	1–0	Eddie Vallejo	KO	2 (6)	27 Apr 1992	Forte Crest Hotel, Glasgow, Scotland	

== Titles in boxing ==
=== Major world titles ===
- WBO mini-flyweight champion (105 lbs)
- WBO junior-flyweight champion (108 lbs)

== See also ==
- List of Mini-flyweight boxing champions
- List of light-flyweight boxing champions

=== Later career — coaching and BJJ ===
After retiring from competition, Weir worked as a professional boxing coach and cut man; named fighters he has worked with include Craig Docherty, Derry Mathews and John Simpson. He later relocated to the United Arab Emirates and has worked as a coach and personal trainer in Dubai. Weir has also trained and competed in Brazilian jiu‑jitsu; he is listed with Entropy Jiu Jitsu in Dubai and received his BJJ black belt under Professor Thabet Al Taher in 2022.

== Honours and distinctions ==
Weir was inducted into the Scottish Boxing Hall of Fame in 2010. He won his first world title in his sixth professional fight (WBO mini‑flyweight, 15 May 1993) and his second in his ninth professional fight (WBO junior‑flyweight, 23 November 1994), making him one of the fastest two‑division world champions in modern professional boxing; comparable rapid achievers include Jeff Fenech, Leon Spinks, Guillermo Rigondeaux, Vasyl Lomachenko and Naoya Inoue.

Sporting positions
World boxing titles
Vacant Title last held by Rafael Torres	WBO mini-flyweight champion 15 May 1993 – 16 December 1993; Vacated	Vacant Title next held by Alex Sánchez
Vacant Title last held by Michael Carbajal	WBO junior-flyweight champion 23 November 1994 – 18 November 1995	Succeeded by Jacob Matlala
