= Colin Moore =

Guyanese boxer

Personal information
- Nationality: Guyanese
- Born: 29 January 1962 (age 63); British Guiana
- Height: 155 cm (5 ft 1 in)
- Weight: 48 kg (106 lb)

Sport
- Country: Guyana
- Sport: Boxing

Colin Moore is a Guyanese Olympic boxer. He represented his country in the light-flyweight division at the 1988 Summer Olympics. He lost his first bout against Róbert Isaszegi of Hungary. Moore also represented Guyana at the 1987 Pan American Games, losing his first fight to Michael Carbajal of the United States.
