= Róbert Isaszegi =

Hungarian boxer (born 1965)

Personal information
- Full name: Isaszegi Róbert
- Nationality: Hungary
- Born: 2 May 1965 (age 61) Sárospatak, Borsod-Abaúj-Zemplén
- Height: 1.64 m (5 ft 5 in)
- Weight: 48 kg (106 lb)

Sport
- Sport: Boxing
- Weight class: Light Flyweight
- Club: Borsodi Bányász
Medal record
Olympic Games
Bronze medal – third place	1988 Seoul	Light Flyweight
European Amateur Championships
Silver medal – second place	1989 Athens	Light Flyweight
Bronze medal – third place	1985 Budapest	Light Flyweight

Róbert Isaszegi (born 2 May 1965 in Sárospatak, Borsod-Abaúj-Zemplén) is a Hungarian boxer, who won the bronze medal in the light flyweight division (– 48 kg) at the 1988 Summer Olympics.

== Amateur career ==
- Bronze medalist in the 1985 European Amateur Boxing Championships at Light Flyweight, Budapest, Hungary
- Silver medalist in the 1989 European Amateur Boxing Championships at Light Flyweight, Athen, Greece
- Bronze medalist in the 1990 Goodwill Games at Light Flyweight, Seattle, WA, USA
- Representing Hungary, won the Light Flyweight bronze medal at the 1988 Olympics in Seoul, Korea.

=== Olympic Results ===
- 1988 Olympic Results - Boxed as a Light Flyweights (48 kg)
  - 1st Round - bye
  - Round of 32 - Defeated Colin Moore of Guyana, 5–0
  - Round of 16 - Defeated Sadoon Abboud of Iraq, RSC-1
  - Quarterfinals - Defeated Chartchai Sasakul of Thailand, 3–2
  - Semifinals - Lost to Michael Carbajal of United States, 1–4

== Pro career ==
Isaszegi began his professional career in 1988 and had limited success, most recently losing in 2005 to Ivan Pozo by 1st-round TKO.
