= Sadoon Abboud =

Iraqi boxer (born 1967)

Personal information
- Nationality: Iraqi
- Born: 2 July 1967 (age 57)
- Height: 1.70 m (5 ft 7 in)
- Weight: 48 kg (106 lb)

Sport
- Sport: Boxing

Sadoon Abboud (born 2 July 1967) is an Iraqi boxer. He competed in the 1988 Summer Olympics in the featherweight division. In his first round, he beat Laotian boxer Bounmy Thephavong. In his second round, he lost to Róbert Isaszegi of Hungary.
