= Tom Chisenga =

Zambian boxer (born 1969)

Personal information
- Nationality: Zambian
- Born: 8 April 1969 (age 55)

Sport
- Sport: Boxing

Thomas Chisenga (born 8 April 1969) is a Zambian boxer. He competed in the men's light flyweight event at the 1988 Summer Olympics.
