= Marcelino Bolívar =

Venezuelan boxer (born 1964)

Personal information
- Born: July 14, 1964 (age 61)
Medal record
Men's Boxing
Representing Venezuela
Olympic Games
| Bronze medal – third place | 1984 Los Angeles | Light Flyweight |
Central American and Caribbean Games
| Bronze medal – third place | 1986 Santiago | Light Flyweight |

José Marcelino Bolivar (born July 14, 1964) is a Venezuelan former professional boxer who competed from 1989 to 1994. He challenged for the IBF mini flyweight title in 1994. As an amateur, he won the bronze medal in the flyweight division at the 1984 Summer Olympics in Los Angeles as well as the 1988 Summer Olympics in Seoul.

== Olympic results ==
1984

- Defeated Nelson Jamili (Philippines) 5-0
- Defeated Agapito Gómez (Spain) 4-1
- Defeated Carlos Motta (Guatemala) 5-0
- Lost to Paul Gonzales (United States) 5-0

1988

- 1st round bye
- Lost to Jesus Beltre (Dominican Republic) 4-1

== Professional career ==
Bolivar made his professional debut on July 28, 1989, and ran into his first defeat after ten consecutive wins against countryman Juan Antonio Torres in the fight for the WBA Fedelatin light flyweight title. Bolivar ended his professional career in 1994, after 21 fights (seventeen wins, four defeats).
