= Carlos Motta (boxer) =

Guatemalan boxer

Carlos Santiago Motta Taracena (born July 25, 1956) is a retired boxer from Guatemala who competed in the light flyweight division (– 48 kg) at the 1984 Summer Olympics in Los Angeles, California.

He was the fourth Guatemalan boxer to participate in the Olympics and the first since 1968. After defeating Mustafa Genç from Turkey in the first round and Daniel Mwangi from Kenya in the second round, Motta was eliminated in the quarterfinals by Venezuela's eventual bronze medalist Marcelino Bolivar.
