= Daniel Mwangi (boxer) =

Kenyan boxer (born 1965)

Personal information
- Nationality: Kenyan
- Born: 20 November 1965 (age 59)

Sport
- Sport: Boxing

Daniel Mwangi (born 20 November 1965) is a Kenyan boxer. He competed in the men's light flyweight event at the 1984 Summer Olympics.
