= Liu Hsin-hung =

Taiwanese boxer

Liu Hsin-hung (劉 欣宏)
Personal information
- Nationality: Taiwanese
- Born: 30 October 1969 (age 56)
- Weight: Light flyweight

Boxing career

Liu Hsin-hung (Chinese: 劉 欣宏; pinyin: Liú Xīn-hóng; born 30 October 1969) is a Taiwanese boxer. He competed for Chinese Taipei at the 1988 Summer Olympics.
