= Mamoru Kuroiwa =

Japanese boxer (born 1962)

Mamoru Kuroiwa (黒岩 守, Kuroiwa Mamoru; born December 16, 1962) is a retired boxer from Japan, who twice competed for his native country at the Summer Olympics: 1984 and 1988. He lost in the quarterfinals of the light flyweight division to Zambia's eventual bronze medalist Keith Mwila at the 1984 Olympics in Los Angeles, California. In the light flyweight division at the 1988 Olympics in Seoul, he lost his opening bout to Ochiryn Demberel of Mongolia by knockout in the third round.

== 1988 Olympic results ==
Below is the record of Mamoru Kuroiwa, a Japanese light flyweight boxer who competed at the 1988 Seoul Olympics:

- Round of 64: lost to Ochiryn Demberel (Mongolia) referee stopped contest in the third round
