= Scotty Olson =

Canadian boxer

Personal information
- Nickname: Bulldog
- Nationality: Canadian
- Born: Scotty Robert Olson; 26 February 1968 (age 58)
- Height: 5 ft 1 in (1.55 m)
- Weight: Flyweight

Boxing career
- Reach: 62 in (157 cm)
- Stance: Orthodox

Boxing record
- Total fights: 40
- Wins: 34
- Win by KO: 25
- Losses: 4
- Draws: 2

Scotty Robert Olson (born 26 February 1968), known as Scotty Olson, and nicknamed Bulldog is a Canadian former flyweight boxer. He won the Light Flyweight Gold Medal in the 1986 Commonwealth Games, and reached the quarterfinals of the 1988 Olympic Games in Seoul. He also represented Canada at the 1987 Pan American Games.

He also became International Boxing Organization and United States Boxing Association flyweight champion, before retiring in 2002, having recorded 34 wins, 25 knockouts, 4 losses and 2 draws, one of his losses, a 10th-round knockout defeat against Michael Carbajal in a long-awaited bout. He now helps train Canadian boxers. He was inducted into Boxing Canada’s Hall of Fame, Class of 2020.

On the morning of January 18, 2015, Olson suffered a near-fatal heart attack at his home. His wife performed CPR until medical help arrived. He was placed in a medically induced coma, after which two stents were put into his heart. Doctors were initially concerned about his condition since his brain had been deprived of oxygen for "a period of time," but Olson came out of the coma about a week after the heart attack, and was released from the hospital a week after that.
