= Moustafa Esmail =

Egyptian boxer (born 1965)

Personal information
- Nationality: Egyptian
- Born: 23 June 1965 (age 60)

Sport
- Sport: Boxing

Moustafa Esmail (born 23 June 1965) is an Egyptian boxer. He competed at the 1988 Summer Olympics and the 1992 Summer Olympics.
