= Ochiryn Demberel =

Mongolian boxer

Personal information
- Nationality: Mongolian
- Born: 12 August 1963 (age 61)

Sport
- Sport: Boxing

Ochiryn Demberel (born 12 August 1963) is a Mongolian boxer. He competed in the men's light flyweight event at the 1988 Summer Olympics.
