= José de Jesús (boxer) =

Puerto Rican boxer

Jose de Jesus
Personal information
- Nickname: Cagüitas
- Nationality: (Puerto Rico) Puerto Rican
- Born: Jose De Jesus; August 12, 1963 (age 62) Cayey, Puerto Rico
- Weight: Light flyweight

Boxing career

Boxing record
- Total fights: 41
- Wins: 31
- Win by KO: 22
- Losses: 9
- Draws: 1
- No contests: 0

Jose De Jesus (born August 12, 1963 in Cayey, Puerto Rico) is a retired professional boxer in the light flyweight (108 lb) division.

== Pro career ==
Nicknamed "Cagüitas", De Jesus became the first WBO light flyweight champion on May 19, 1989. He defended this title three times, but was stripped of it in March 1992 for failure to defend.

== See also ==
- List of Puerto Rican boxing world champions
- List of light-flyweight boxing champions

Achievements
Inaugural Champion	WBO light flyweight champion May 19, 1989 – March, 1992; Stripped	Vacant Title next held by Josué Camacho
