= Rafael Ramos (boxer) =

Puerto Rican retired boxer

Personal information
- Nickname: Fito
- Nationality: Puerto Rican
- Born: January 1, 1965 (age 61) Fajardo, Puerto Rico
- Height: 1.55 m (5 ft 1 in)
- Weight: 48 kg (106 lb)

Sport
- Sport: Boxing
- Weight class: Light Flyweight
Medal record
Pan American Games
Gold medal – first place	1983 Caracas	Light Flyweight
Bronze medal – third place	1987 Indianapolis	Flyweight
World Cup
Bronze medal – third place	1985 Seoul	Light Flyweight

Rafael "Fito" Ramos (born January 1, 1965) is a retired boxer from Puerto Rico. He competed in the 1984 Summer Olympics and twice won a medal (gold and bronze) at the Pan American Games during his career.

== 1984 Olympic record ==
Below are the results of Rafael Ramos, a Puerto Rican light flyweight boxer who competed at the 1984 Olympics in Los Angeles:

- Round of 32 defeated Carlos Salazar (Argentina) by walkover
- Round of 16: defeated Jesus Herrera (Dominican Republic) by decision, 4–1
- Quarterfinal: lost to Salvatore Todisco (Italy) by decision, 1-4
