= Đỗ Tiến Tuấn =

Vietnamese boxer (1967–before 2020)

Personal information
- Nationality: Vietnamese
- Born: 3 September 1967 Haiphong, North Vietnam
- Died: Unknown date (before 2020) Haiphong, Vietnam

Sport
- Sport: Boxing

Đỗ Tiến Tuấn (3 September 1967 – before 2020) was a Vietnamese boxer. He competed in the men's welterweight event at the 1988 Summer Olympics.

== Early life ==
Tuấn was born on 3 September 1967, in Haiphong, North Vietnam. He learned boxing since he was a young boy.

== Career ==
Đỗ Tiến Tuấn qualified for 1988 Summer Olympics by a wildcard spot.

== Arrest, murder and death ==
During his career peak, he was arrested twice, each for alleged disturbance of public order. Later, he received a 18-month imprisonment for his abuse of trust and misappropriation of citizen's property.

While in prison for theft, he murdered two other prisoners and was sentenced to life imprisonment. He continued fighting prisoners while in prison before being beaten to death sometime before 2020 during one altercation.
