= William Bagonza =

Ugandan boxer

Personal information
- Nationality: Ugandan
- Born: 12 November 1960
- Died: 9 December 2000 (aged 40)

Sport
- Sport: Boxing

William Bagonza (12 November 1960 – 9 December 2000) was a Ugandan boxer. He competed in the men's light flyweight event at the 1984 Summer Olympics.
