= Aleksandr Makhmutov =

Russian boxer

Personal information
- Nationality: Russian
- Born: Aleksandr Musafovic Makhmutov; 10 March 1966 (age 60) Revda, Russian SFSR, Soviet Union
- Height: 5 ft 2 in (157 cm)
- Weight: Flyweight; Super Flyweight

Boxing career

Boxing record
- Total fights: 51
- Wins: 42
- Win by KO: 21
- Losses: 8
- Draws: 1
- No contests: 0

Aleksandr Musafovic Makhmutov (born 10 March 1966) is a Russian boxer. He competed in the men's light flyweight event at the 1988 Summer Olympics.

== Career ==
Makhmutov continued boxing and briefly held the EBU flyweight champion between 1999 and 2000. He returned to the championship in late 2000 and has defended it five times before losing when challenging for the WBO flyweight world champion against a French Brahim Asloum in 2004. He retired after this defeat. Before that, in 2003 he had challenged for the WBO flyweight world champion once against Omar Narváez of Argentina, losing by TKO.
