= Yehuda Ben-Haim =

Israeli boxer

Personal information
- Nationality: Israeli
- Born: 29 September 1955
- Died: 5 March 2012 (aged 56)
- Weight: Light flyweight

Boxing career

Yehuda Ben-Haim (Hebrew: יהודה בן-חיים; 29 September 1955 – 5 March 2012) was an Israeli boxer. He competed in the light flyweight event at the 1984 Summer Olympics. At the 1988 Summer Olympics he had a first-round bye. His second-round match, however, fell on Yom Kippur, and he refused to compete. As a result, Ben-Haim was disqualified and eliminated from the tournament.
