= Jesús Beltre =

Dominican boxer (born 1964)

Personal information
- Nationality: Dominican
- Born: 26 December 1964 (age 61) La Romana, Dominican Republic

Sport
- Sport: Boxing
Medal record
Men's amateur boxing
Representing Dominican Republic
Pan American Games
| Bronze medal – third place | 1987 Indianapolis | Light flyweight |

Jesús Beltre (born 26 December 1964) is a Dominican Republic boxer. He competed at the 1984 Summer Olympics and the 1988 Summer Olympics.
