= Sammy Stewart (boxer) =

Liberian boxer (born 1969)

Personal information
- Nationality: Liberian
- Born: 9 March 1969 (age 56); Monrovia, Liberia

Sport
- Sport: Boxing

Sammy Stewart (born 9 March 1969) is a Liberian boxer. He competed in the men's light flyweight event at the 1988 Summer Olympics.
