= Gerard Hawkins =

Irish boxer (born 1961)

Personal information
- Full name: Gerard (Gerry) Hawkins
- Nationality: Irish
- Born: 17 January 1961 (age 64); Belfast

Sport
- Sport: Boxing

Gerard Hawkins (born 17 January 1961) is an Irish boxer. He competed at the 1980 Summer Olympics and the 1984 Summer Olympics.
