= Mahjoub M'jirih =

Moroccan boxer

Personal information
- Nationality: Moroccan
- Born: 1960 (age 64–65); Marrakesh, Morocco

Sport
- Sport: Boxing

Mahjoub M'jirih (born 1960) is a Moroccan boxer. He competed at the 1984 Summer Olympics and the 1988 Summer Olympics.
