= Pakistan at the 1988 Summer Olympics =

- IOC code: PAK
- NOC: National Olympic Committee of Pakistan
- Website: www.nocpakistan.org

in Seoul
- Competitors: 30 in 6 sports
- Flag bearer: Nasir Ali
- Medals Ranked 46th: Gold 0 Silver 0 Bronze 1 Total 1

Summer Olympics appearances (overview)
- 1948; 1952; 1956; 1960; 1964; 1968; 1972; 1976; 1980; 1984; 1988; 1992; 1996; 2000; 2004; 2008; 2012; 2016; 2020; 2024; 2028

Other related appearances
- India (1900–pres.); Bangladesh (1984–pres.)

Pakistan competed at the 1988 Summer Olympics in Seoul, South Korea.

== Competitors ==
The following is the list of number of competitors in the Games.

Sport	Men	Women	Total
Athletics	7	0	7
Boxing	2	–	2
Field hockey	15	0	15
Sailing	2	0	2
Table tennis	1	0	1
Wrestling	3	–	3
Total	30	0	30

== Medalists ==
Medal	Name	Sport	Event	Date
Bronze	Hussain Shah	Boxing	Middleweight	29 September

Medals by sport
Sport	Gold	Silver	Bronze	Total
Boxing	0	0	1	1
Total	0	0	1	1

== Athletics ==
=== Men ===
==== Track events ====
Athlete	Events	Heat		Round 2		Semifinal		Final	
Athlete	Events	Time	Position	Time	Position	Time	Position	Time	Position
Muhammad Afzal	100m	10.91	77	Did not advance					
Muhammad Afzal	200m	21.89	52	Did not advance					
Muhammad Fayyaz	400m	47.13	39	Did not advance					
Syed Meesaq Rizvi	800m	1:51.58	50	Did not advance					
Bashir Ahmad; Muhammad Afzal; Fiaz Muhammad; Muhammad Sadaqat	4 × 400 m Relay	3:08.54	15			3:09.50	16	Did not advance	

==== Field events ====
Athlete	Event	Qualifying		Final	
Athlete	Event	Distance	Position	Distance	Position
Haider Ali Shah	Triple Jump	14.88m	37	Did not advance	
Muhammad Urfaq	Long Jump	7.09m	31	Did not advance	

== Boxing ==
Athlete	Event	Round of 64	Round of 32	Round of 16	Quarterfinals	Semifinals	Final
Athlete	Event	Opposition Result	Opposition Result	Opposition Result	Opposition Result	Opposition Result	Opposition Result
Abrar-Hussain Syed	Light Middleweight	Meziane (ALG); W KOH Rd2	Iapatu (VEN); WO	Downey (CAN); L 0:5	Did not advance		
Hussain Shah	Middleweight		Amarillas (MEX); W 3:2	Kabongo (ZAI); W 5:0	Fuzesy (HUN); W 3:2	Marcus (CAN); L 1:4 (bronze)	Did not advance

== Hockey ==
=== Men's team competition ===
Preliminary round Group A

- Defeated Spain (5–1)
- Defeated Kenya (8–0)
- Defeated Argentina (2–1)
- Lost to Australia (0–4)
- Lost to Netherlands (0–2)

Semifinals round

- Defeated Soviet Union (1–0)

Final 5-6 places

- Defeated India (2–1)

Pakistan finished 5th

Team Roster

- Nasir Ali (captain)
- Ishtiaq Ahmed (vice-captain)
- Mansoor Ahmed (gk)
- Rizwan Munir (gk)
- Khalid Bashir
- Qazi Mohib
- Naeem Akhtar
- Naeem Amjad
- Aamer Zafar
- Tariq Sheikh
- Zahid Sharif
- Khalid Hamid
- Musaddiq Hussain
- Shahbaz Ahmed
- Qamar Ibrahim
- Tahir Zaman

== Table tennis ==
Athlete	Event	Preliminary round	Round of 16	Quarterfinal	Semifinal	Final
Athlete	Event	Opposition Score	Opposition Score	Opposition Score	Opposition Score	Opposition Score
Farjad Saif	Men's Singles	Lindh (SWE); L 1-3 Douglas (GBR); L 0-3; Kalinic (YUG); W 3–1; Kano (BRA); W 3-0; Huang (TPE); L 0-3; Abdelhalim (EGY); L 1-3; Fermin Martinez (DOM); W 3-1; 4th in group	Did not advance			

== Wrestling ==
=== Men's freestyle ===
Athlete	Event	Preliminary round	Standing	Final
Athlete	Event	Opposition Score	Standing	Opposition Score
Mohammad Anwar	74 kg	Diouf (SEN); W 4-0 Vagozari (IRI); L 20-9 (pts); Varaev (URS); L 10-5 (pts)	7th in group 13th overall	Did not advance
Mohammad Azeem	57 kg	Auer (AUT); W 3-0 Kanehama (JPN); L 7-4	11th in group 21st overall	Did not advance
Abdul Majid	90 kg	Koenig (AUS); W 4-0 Iloanusi (NGR); W 7-1; Ota (JPN); L 7-11; Toth (HUN); L 2-6	4th in group 7th overall	Did not advance

== Sailing ==
Men

Athlete	Event	Race							Score	Rank
Athlete	Event	1	2	3	4	5	6	7	Score	Rank
Javed Rasool; Mamoon Sadiq	470	24	26	28	26	-	25	25	187	29
