= Boxing at the 1988 Summer Olympics – Middleweight =

Olympic boxing tournament

Middleweight boxing at the Games of the XXIV Olympiad
- Venue: Jamsil Students' Gymnasium
- Dates: 19 September – 1 October 1988
- Competitors: 33 from 33 nations

Medalists
1st place, gold medalist(s)		Henry Maske	East Germany
2nd place, silver medalist(s)		Egerton Marcus	Canada
3rd place, bronze medalist(s)		Chris Sande	Kenya
3rd place, bronze medalist(s)		Hussain Shah	Pakistan

The men's middleweight event was part of the boxing programme at the 1988 Summer Olympics. The weight class allowed boxers of up to 75 kilograms to compete. The competition was held from 19 September to 1 October 1988. 33 boxers from 33 nations competed. Henry Maske won the gold medal.

Anthony Hembrick of the United States never had the opportunity to fight in the 1988 Olympics. Hembrick and his coach, Ken Adams, misinterpreted the fight schedule. Afterwards, they blamed the schedule for being too confusing. By the time Hembrick arrived at Chamshil Students' Gymnasium twelve minutes late, he had been disqualified and the match was being awarded to South Korean Ha Jong-ho.

== Medalists ==
Gold	Henry Maske; East Germany
Silver	Egerton Marcus; Canada
Bronze	Chris Sande; Kenya
Bronze	Hussain Shah; Pakistan

== Results ==
The following boxers took part in the event:

Rank	Name	Country
1	Henry Maske	East Germany
2	Egerton Marcus	Canada
3T	Chris Sande	Kenya
3T	Hussain Shah	Pakistan
5T	Franco Wanyama	Uganda
5T	Michele Mastrodonato	Italy
5T	Zoltán Füzesy	Hungary
5T	Sven Ottke	West Germany
9T	Paul Kamela	Cameroon
9T	Kieran Joyce	Ireland
9T	Sello Mojela	Lesotho
9T	Lotfi Ayed	Sweden
9T	Serge Kabongo	Zaire
9T	Esa Hukkanen	Finland
9T	Darko Dukić	Yugoslavia
9T	Ruslan Taramov	Soviet Union
17T	Juan Carlos Montiel	Uruguay
17T	Georgios Ioannidis	Greece
17T	Filipo Palako Vaka	Tonga
17T	Omar Dabaj	Jordan
17T	Simeon Stubblefield	Liberia
17T	Helman Palije	Malawi
17T	John Tobin	Grenada
17T	Martín Amarillas	Mexico
17T	James Iahuat	Vanuatu
17T	Ahmed Dine	Algeria
17T	Roberto Martínez	Honduras
17T	Viliamu Lesiva	Western Samoa
17T	Emmanuel Legaspi	Philippines
17T	Samuel Simbo	Sierra Leone
17T	Ha Jong-ho	South Korea
32T	Aharon Jacobashvili	Israel
32T	Mirwan Kassouf	Lebanon

=== Finals ===
Semifinals
Chris Sande (KEN)	0
Henry Maske (GDR)	5
Hussain Shah Syed (PAK)	1
Egerton Marcus (CAN)	4

Final
Henry Maske (GDR)	5
Egerton Marcus (CAN)	0

=== Top half ===
==== Section 1 ====
Round of 64

Round of 32
Chris Sande (KEN)	KO
Juan Montiel (URU)	3
Paul Kamela (CMR)	3
Georgios Ioannidis (GRE)	2
Kieran Joyce (IRL)	RSC
Filipo Palako Vaka (TGA)	1
Franco Wanyama (UGA)	5
Omar Dabaj (JOR)	0

Round of 16
Chris Sande (KEN)	5
Paul Kamela (CMR)	0
Kieran Joyce (IRL)	2
Franco Wanyama (UGA)	3

Quarterfinals
Chris Sande (KEN)	5
Franco Wanyama (UGA)	0

==== Section 2 ====
Round of 64
Michele Mastrodonato (ITA)	RSC
Mirwan Kassouf (LIB)	1

Round of 32
Sello Mojela (LES)	5
Simon Stubblefield (LBR)	0
Henry Maske (GDR)	5
Helman Palije (MAW)	0
Lotfi Ayed (SWE)	5
John Tobin (GRN)	0
Michele Mastrodonato (ITA)	w/o
Anthony Hembrick (USA)

Round of 16
Sello Mojela (LES)
Henry Maske (GDR)	w/o
Lotfi Ayed (SWE)	0
Michele Mastrodonato (ITA)	5

Quarterfinals
Henry Maske (GDR)	5
Michele Mastrodonato (ITA)	0

=== Bottom Half ===
==== Section 3 ====
Round of 64

Round of 32
Hussain Shah Syed (PAK)	3
Martin Amarillas (MEX)	2
Serge Kabongo (COD)	RSC
James Iahuat (VAN)	1
Zoltán Fuzesy (HUN)	5
Ahmed Dine (ALG)	0
Esa Hukkanen (FIN)	5
Roberto Martínez (HON)	0

Round of 16
Hussain Shah Syed (PAK)	5
Serge Kabongo (COD)	0
Zoltán Fuzesy (HUN)	5
Esa Hukkanen (FIN)	0

Quarterfinals
Hussain Shah Syed (PAK)	3
Zoltán Fuzesy (HUN)	2

==== Section 4 ====
Round of 64
Sven Ottke (FRG)	5
Aharon Jacobashvili (ISR)	0

Round of 32
Darko Dukić (YUG)	RSC
Viliamu Lesiva (SAM)	2
Egerton Marcus (CAN)	KO
Emmanuel Legaspi (PHI)	1
Ruslan Taramov (URS)	KO
Samuel Simbo (SLE)	1
Sven Ottke (FRG)	5
Ha Jong-Ho (KOR)	0

Round of 16
Darko Dukić (YUG)	2
Egerton Marcus (CAN)	KO
Ruslan Taramov (URS)	0
Sven Ottke (FRG)	5

Quarterfinals
Egerton Marcus (CAN)	5
Sven Ottke (FRG)	0
