= Hussain Shah =

Pakistani boxer (born 1964)

Syed Hussain Alam Shah
Personal information
- Nationality: Pakistani
- Born: Syed Hussain Shah; August 14, 1964 (age 62) Lyari, Karachi, Pakistan
- Weight: Middleweight

Boxing career
Medal record
Men's Boxing
Representing Pakistan
Event	1st	2nd	3rd
Olympic Games	–	–	1
Asian Games	–	1	–
Asian Championships	1	1	–
South Asian Games	5	–	–
Total	6	2	1
Olympic Games
Bronze medal – third place	1988 Seoul	Middleweight
Asian Games
Silver medal – second place	1986 Seoul	Light Heavyweight
Asian Championships
Gold medal – first place	1987 Kuwait City	Middleweight
Silver medal – second place	1989 Beijing	Middleweight
South Asian Games
Gold medal – first place	1984 Kathmandu	Middleweight
Gold medal – first place	1985 Dhaka	Middleweight
Gold medal – first place	1987 Calcutta	Middleweight
Gold medal – first place	1989 Islamabad	Middleweight
Gold medal – first place	1991 Colombo	Middleweight

Syed Hussain Shah (Urdu: سيد حسين شاه) (born August 14, 1964) is a retired Pakistani boxer from Lyari, Karachi, who won the bronze medal in the Middleweight division (71–75 kg) at the 1988 Seoul Olympics. Hussain Shah was South Asia's first and only Olympic boxing medalist for 20 years until Vijender Singh of India matched his feat in 2008. He also remains Pakistan's first and only Olympic boxing medalist. Shah was the second Pakistani to win an individual Olympic medal. The only other Pakistanis to ever win individual Olympic medals are the wrestler Muhammad Bashir, who won a bronze medal at the 1960 Summer Olympics, and Arshad Nadeem, who won gold medal in Javelin throw at the 2024 Summer Olympics.

== Early life ==
Shah was born in Lyari, Karachi. As a child Shah lived on the streets due to being homeless, and worked as a labourer to earn money. Shah trained himself for boxing on the streets, using garbage bags as makeshift punching bags.

== Career ==
Shah won his first gold medal at 1984 South Asian Games in Kathmandu, along with Asghar Ali, Ilyas Ahmed and Muhammad Yousaf. At the 1987 edition of the Games in Kolkata, he was adjudged the 'best boxer'.

At the 1988 Summer Olympics he shared the podium with Kenya's Chris Sande. He was South Asia's first boxer to win any medal in olympic boxing.

Shah, who has also to his credit five consecutive gold in the South Asian Games history, remained the best boxer of Asia from 1980 to 1988, a rare prominence achieved by any Pakistani pugilist so far.

He later moved to Japan, where his son Shah Hussain Shah learned judo and went on to represent Pakistan at the international level.

== Popular culture ==
A biopic called Shah was released in Pakistan on 14 August 2015. The film chronicles Hussain Shah's poverty stricken childhood, his rise to fame as the Asian Boxing Champion and Olympic Bronze Medalist, his subsequent return to poverty and finally his migration to Japan to coach Japanese boxers. The movie is directed and written by Adnan Sarwar with music by Adnan Sarwar and Farhan Albert. Shah received a total of nine nominations across the ARY Film Awards and the Lux Style Awards for its cinematic storytelling.

== Awards and recognition ==
Ribbon	Decoration	Country	Year
	Sitara-e-Imtiaz	Pakistan	1989

In 1989, the Lyari born boxer received Sitara-e-Imtiaz medal from Government of Pakistan.

== Olympic results ==
=== 1988 Seoul Summer Olympics ===
Men's Middleweight

- 1st round bye
- Defeated (Mexico) Martín Amarillas 3-2
- Defeated (Zaire) Serge Kabongo 5-0
- Defeated (Hungary) Zoltán Füzesy 3-2
- Lost to (Canada) Egerton Marcus 1-4

== See also ==
- Pakistan at the Olympics
