= Chris Sande =

Kenyan boxer (born 1964)

Personal information
- Full name: Christopher Joseph Sande
- Born: 10 February 1964 (age 62)
- Height: 173 cm (5 ft 8 in)
Medal record
Men's boxing
Representing Kenya
Olympic Games
Bronze medal – third place	1988 Seoul	Middleweight

Christopher Joseph Sande (born 10 February 1964) is a Kenyan former professional boxer. As an amateur, he won the bronze medal in the Middleweight division at the 1988 Summer Olympics in Seoul. He shared the podium with Pakistan's Hussain Shah Syed.

== Olympic results ==
- 1st round bye
- Defeated Juan Montiel (Uruguay) KO 3
- Defeated Paul Kamela (Cameroon) 5–0
- Defeated Francis Wanyama (Uganda) 5–0
- Lost to Henry Maske (East Germany) 0–5

== Professional career ==
Sande turned pro in 1989 and had limited success. He was a journeyman fighter best known for his losses against Robert Allen, Chris Johnson, Tim Littles, Luis Ramon Campas, and Alejandro Garcia. Sande retired in 2001 with a record of 19–19–2.

== Professional boxing record ==
19 Wins (7 knockouts, 12 decisions), 19 Losses (9 knockouts, 10 decision), 2 Draws, 1 No Contest
Result	Record	Opponent	Type	Round	Date	Location	Notes
Loss	13–0	(Mexico) Alejandro Garcia	TKO	4	6 July 2001	(Mexico) Jai Alai Fronton, Tijuana, Baja California	
Loss	77–4	(Mexico) Luis Ramon Campas	UD	10	16 June 2001	(Mexico) Centro de Usos Multiples, Hermosillo, Sonora	
Loss	24–2	(Mexico) Rito Ruvalcaba	KO	6	15 February 1999	(Mexico) Tijuana, Baja California	
Loss	18–1–2	(Argentina) Ramon Pedro Moyano	PTS	12	17 October 1998	(Uruguay) Conrad Hotel & Casino, Punta del Este	WBA Fedelatin Middleweight Title.
Loss	8–0	(United States) Nicholas Martinez	UD	6	11 July 1998	(United States) Long Beach, California	
Loss	17–4	(United States) Tim Shocks	TKO	1	4 March 1998	(United States) Lucky Eagle Casino, Rochester, Washington	
Loss	20–0	(Canada) Manny Sobral	UD	10	1 October 1997	(United States) Lucky Eagle Casino, Rochester, Washington	
Loss	66–2	(Mexico) Luis Ramon Campas	UD	10	2 June 1997	(Mexico) Tijuana, Baja California	
Draw	5–0–1	(Cuba) Julio "Cuban Lover" Garcia	PTS	8	5 March 1997	(United States) Lucky Eagle Casino, Rochester, Washington	
Draw	16–1–2	(United States) Justin Racine	PTS	6	30 October 1996	(United States) Lucky Eagle Casino, Rochester, Washington	
Loss	7–0	(Ghana) Joseph Laryea	UD	8	23 April 1996	(United States) The Palace of Auburn Hills, Auburn Hills, Michigan	
Loss	26–1	(United States) Tim Littles	TKO	3	9 March 1996	(Republic of Ireland) Green Glens Arena, Millstreet	
Loss	11–0	(Jamaica) Chris Johnson	TKO	2	22 April 1995	(United States) MGM Grand Garden Arena, Las Vegas, Nevada	
Loss	9–1	(United States) Robert Allen	KO	7	2 November 1994	(United States) Woodland Hills, California	
Win	15–5	(United States) Clarence White	PTS	6	2 July 1994	(United States) Harveys Lake Tahoe, Stateline, Nevada	
Loss	17–6–1	(Uganda) Art Serwano	UD	4	13 June 1994	(United States) Great Western Forum, Inglewood, California	
Loss	17–3	(United States) Ray McElroy	TKO	4	2 April 1994	(United States) Las Vegas, Nevada	Referee stopped the bout at 1:21 of the fourth round.
Win	5–5	(Mexico) David Mendez	KO	5	10 January 1994	(United States) Great Western Forum, Inglewood, California	
Win	1–6	(Mexico) Guillermo Chavez	TKO	4	29 October 1993	(Burkina Faso) Ouagadougou	
Win	10–9	(New Zealand) Alberto MaChong	KO	5	28 May 1993	(Burkina Faso) Bobo-Dioulasso	
Loss	17–2–1	(Wales) Nicky Piper	TKO	9	10 April 1993	(Wales) Swansea	WBA Intercontinental Light Heavyweight Title.
Loss	6–0–1	(United States) Rodney Toney	PTS	8	30 March 1993	(United States) San Diego Sports Arena, San Diego	
Win	4–4–2	(United States) Otis Pimpleton	PTS	8	4 November 1992	(United States) Reseda Country Club, Los Angeles, California	
Win	4–3–1	(United States) James Rivas	PTS	6	4 September 1992	(United States) Reseda Country Club, Los Angeles, California	
No Contest	4–3–1	(United States) James Rivas	ND	1	28 July 1992	(United States) Reseda Country Club, Los Angeles, California	
Loss	8–4–1	(United States) Warren Williams	UD	8	9 April 1992	(United States) Bally's Las Vegas, Las Vegas, Nevada	
Win	7–0–2	(United States) Earl Jackson	TKO	6	14 February 1992	(United States) Las Vegas, Nevada	
Win	9–1–1	(United States) Sonny Brennan	UD	6	10 October 1991	(United States) Bally's Las Vegas, Las Vegas, Nevada	
Win	8–3–1	(United States) Vinson Durham	PTS	10	12 August 1991	(United States) Great Western Forum, Inglewood, California	
Win	3–1	(United States) James G. Mason	PTS	6	26 March 1991	(United States) Las Vegas, Nevada	
Loss	6–1	(United States) Daniel "Pit Bull" Perez	UD	6	26 October 1990	(United States) Lujan Building at Expo New Mexico, Albuquerque, New Mexico	
Win	4–1	(United States) Roger Orlaineta	UD	6	17 August 1990	(United States) Bally's Las Vegas, Las Vegas, Nevada	
Win	13–8–1	(United States) Steve Langley	UD	6	15 June 1990	(United States) Bally's Las Vegas, Las Vegas, Nevada	
Loss	9–0	(United States) Lamar Parks	TKO	5	29 April 1990	(United States) Caesars Atlantic City, Atlantic City, New Jersey	
Win	11–6–1	(United States) Richard Jarvis	TKO	1	1 April 1990	(United States) Caesars Tahoe, Stateline, Nevada	Referee stopped the bout at 2:44 of the first round.
Win	6–10	(United States) Robert Waymon Jackson	UD	6	16 February 1990	(United States) Hacienda Hotel, Las Vegas, Nevada	
Win	5–0	(United States) Willie L. Kemp	SD	4	15 January 1990	(United States) Atlantic City Convention Center, Atlantic City, New Jersey	
Win	--	(United States) James Patterson	UD	4	26 December 1989	(United States) Bally's Las Vegas, Las Vegas, Nevada	
Win	0–2	(United States) Ricky Rios	TKO	1	1 December 1989	(United States) Hacienda Hotel, Las Vegas, Nevada	Referee stopped the bout at 1:53 of the first round.
Win	--	(United States) Juan G. Sanchez	TKO	4	31 October 1989	(United States) Showboat Hotel and Casino, Las Vegas, Nevada	Referee stopped the bout at 0:23 of the fourth round.
Win	2–4	(United States) John Tunstall	UD	4	10 October 1989	(United States) Bally's Las Vegas, Las Vegas, Nevada	
