= William Guthrie (boxer) =

American boxer

Personal information
- Nicknames: KO King; Kid Chocolate
- Born: William Douglas Guthrie; January 17, 1967 (age 59) Philadelphia, Pennsylvania, U.S.
- Height: 6 ft 1 in (185 cm)
- Weight: Light heavyweight; Cruiserweight

Boxing career
- Reach: 74 in (188 cm)
- Stance: Southpaw

Boxing record
- Total fights: 42
- Wins: 35
- Win by KO: 28
- Losses: 4
- Draws: 3

William Douglas Guthrie (born January 17, 1967) is an American former professional boxer.

== Early life ==
Prior to fighting, Guthrie was an admitted former player in the St Louis drugs scene, and he had been kicked off the 1988 US Olympic team after failing a drug test. He also later spent time in prison for drug possession.

== Amateur career ==
Guthrie was the 1985 National Golden Gloves middleweight champion.

== Professional career ==
Guthrie turned pro in 1989 and captured the Vacant IBF Light Heavyweight Title in 1997 with a win over Darrin Allen. He was seen as a looming threat to Roy Jones Jr. at light heavyweight due to his punching power, but instead of a unification bout, he lost the title in his next fight to Reggie Johnson by a knockout in the 5th. The knockout was a brutal one, and Guthrie left the ring on a stretcher. Instead of retiring, he instead moved up to cruiserweight and continued to fight. His final win was against Donnell Wiggins in South Carolina, he would have two more fights before retiring in 2007.

== Professional boxing record ==
42 fights	35 wins	4 losses
By knockout	28	3
By decision	7	1
Draws	3	

No.	Result	Record	Opponent	Type	Round, time	Date	Location	Notes
42	Draw	35–4–3	James Johnson	SD	6 (6)	12/05/2007	Patriot Center, Fairfax, Virginia, U.S.	
41	Loss	35–4–2	Marlon Hayes	UD	12 (12)	26/01/2007	Destiny's, Orlando, Florida, U.S.	
40	Win	35–3–2	Donnell Wiggins	TKO	4 (8)	09/12/2006	County Fairgrounds, Florence, South Carolina, U.S.	
39	Win	34–3–2	Luke Munsen	TKO	5 (12)	29/07/2006	Qwest Arena, Boise, Idaho, U.S.	Won vacant IBF International cruiserweight title
38	Win	33–3–2	Carlos Bates	TKO	1 (4)	27/05/2006	The Plex, North Charleston, South Carolina, U.S.	
37	Win	32–3–2	Eric Starr	TKO	5 (6)	29/04/2006	Greensboro Coliseum, Greensboro, North Carolina, U.S.	
36	Win	31–3–2	Vincent Harris	MD	4 (4)	31/03/2006	Multi Fight Complex, Tampa, Florida, U.S.	
35	Draw	30–3–2	Rodney Moore	MD	6 (6)	03/12/2005	Municipal Coliseum, St. Petersburg, Florida, U.S.	
34	Win	30–3–1	Preston Kenney	KO	1 (8)	02/06/2005	Family Arena, St. Charles, Missouri, U.S.	
33	Win	29–3–1	John Roman Williams	KO	2 (8)	27/11/2004	Louisville Gardens, Louisville, Kentucky, U.S.	
32	Draw	28–3–1	Hilario Guzman	PTS	6 (6)	24/09/2004	Philips Arena, Atlanta, Georgia, U.S.	
31	Loss	28–3	Ravea Springs	TKO	11 (12)	07/02/2002	Adam’s Mark Hotel, St. Louis, Missouri, U.S.	For vacant NABO cruiserweight title
30	Win	28–2	Terry Porter	UD	8 (8)	25/09/2001	The Ambassador, St. Louis, Missouri, U.S.	
29	Win	27–2	Lorenzo Boyd	TKO	2 (8)	24/07/2001	The Ambassador, St. Louis, Missouri, U.S.	
28	Win	26–2	John Kiser	SD	8 (8)	06/05/2000	Pan American Center, Las Cruces, New Mexico, U.S.	
27	Win	25–2	Wesley Martin	UD	8 (8)	11/03/2000	Dade Community College, Miami, Florida, U.S.	
26	Loss	24–2	Michael Nunn	TKO	7 (10)	09/05/1999	Municipal Auditorium, Minot, North Dakota, U.S.	
25	Loss	24–1	Reggie Johnson	KO	5 (12)	06/02/1998	Mohegan Sun Arena, Uncasville, Connecticut, U.S.	Lost IBF light-heavyweight title
24	Win	24–0	Darin Allen	TKO	3 (12)	19/07/1997	Fantasy Springs Resort Casino, Indio, California, U.S.	Won vacant IBF light-heavyweight title
23	Win	23–0	Jamie Stevenson	KO	3 (4)	28/03/1997	The Roxy, Boston, Massachusetts, U.S.	
22	Win	22–0	Ramzi Hassan	TKO	6 (10)	29/06/1996	Fantasy Springs Resort Casino, Indio, California, U.S.	
21	Win	21–0	John Kiser	UD	8 (8)	18/05/1996	Mirage Hotel & Casino, Paradise, Nevada, U.S.	
20	Win	20–0	Jerome Hill	TKO	2 (?)	24/02/1996	Richmond Coliseum, Richmond, Virginia, U.S.	
19	Win	19–0	Tim Hillie	SD	10 (10)	27/01/1996	Veteran's Memorial Coliseum, Phoenix, Arizona, U.S.	
18	Win	18–0	Richard Frazier	KO	4 (12)	08/11/1995	69th Regiment Armory, New York City, New York, U.S.	Won vacant USBA light-heavyweight title
17	Win	17–0	Jeff Bowman	TKO	3 (?)	03/10/1995	Memphis, Tennessee, U.S.	
16	Win	16–0	Ron Butler	TKO	3 (?)	25/04/1995	Youth Center, Cut Off, Louisiana, U.S.	
15	Win	15–0	Travis Meat	KO	1 (8)	06/02/1995	Henry VIII Hotel, Bridgeton, Missouri, U.S.	
14	Win	14–0	Donnie Penelton	KO	2 (8)	28/11/1994	Henry VIII Hotel, Bridgeton, Missouri, U.S.	
13	Win	13–0	Darrell Kizer	TKO	2 (?)	23/06/1994	Florissant, Missouri, U.S.	
12	Win	12–0	Krishna Wainwright	RTD	6 (8)	05/05/1994	Silver Nugget, North Las Vegas, Nevada, U.S.	
11	Win	11–0	Jimmy Bills	KO	3 (?)	11/04/1994	Great Western Forum, Inglewood, California, U.S.	
10	Win	10–0	Tim Knight	PTS	10 (10)	27/08/1993	Regal Riverfront Hotel, St. Louis, Missouri, U.S.	
9	Win	9–0	Anthony Campbell	KO	2 (?)	06/05/1993	Regal Riverfront Hotel, St. Louis, Missouri, U.S.	
8	Win	8–0	Eric Cole	TKO	1 (6)	28/07/1990	Trump Castle, Atlantic City, New Jersey, U.S.	
7	Win	7–0	David Gwynn	KO	1 (6)	27/04/1990	Fairgrounds Arena, Mobile, Alabama, U.S.	
6	Win	6–0	Lee Smith	TKO	1 (?)	24/03/1990	Fairgrounds Arena, Mobile, Alabama, U.S.	
5	Win	5–0	Randy Thomas	TKO	1 (6)	16/02/1990	Clarion Hotel Ballroom, St. Louis, Missouri, U.S.	
4	Win	4–0	Chris Collins	TKO	3 (6)	03/11/1989	Sands Casino, Atlantic City, New Jersey, U.S.	
3	Win	3–0	Roy Bedwell	TKO	1 (6)	27/07/1989	Chase Park Plaza Hotel, St. Louis, Missouri, U.S.	
2	Win	2–0	Clarence Hutchinson	TKO	2 (4)	21/06/1989	Whitey Herzog's Powerhouse Nightclub, St. Louis, Missouri, U.S.	
1	Win	1–0	John Moore	TKO	2 (4)	01/05/1989	Omni International Hotel, St. Louis, Missouri, U.S.	

== See also ==
- List of southpaw stance boxers
- List of world light-heavyweight boxing champions

Sporting positions
Amateur boxing titles
Previous: Virgil Hill	Golden Gloves middleweight champion 1985	Next: Bomani Parker
Regional boxing titles
Vacant Title last held by James Toney	USBA light-heavyweight champion November 8, 1995 – July 19, 1997; Won world title	Vacant Title next held by Will Taylor
Vacant Title last held by Lasse Johansen	IBF International cruiserweight champion July 29, 2006 – 2006; Vacated	Vacant Title next held by Pavol Polakovič
World boxing titles
Vacant Title last held by Dariusz Michalczewski	IBF light-heavyweight champion July 19, 1997 – February 6, 1998	Succeeded by Reggie Johnson
