= Henry Maske =

German boxer (born 1964)

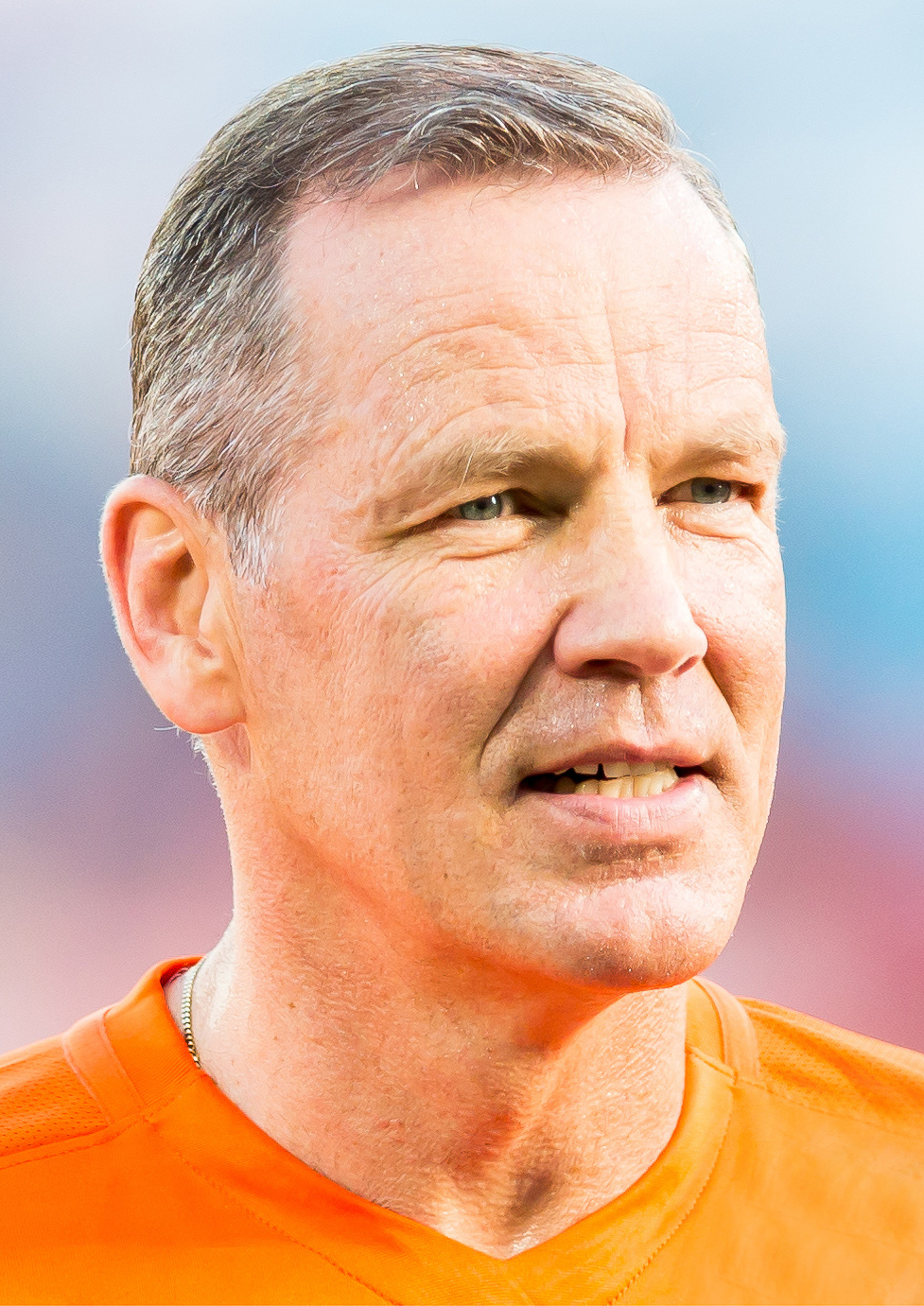
- Maske in 2016

Personal information
- Nickname: Gentleman
- Nationality: German
- Born: Henry Maske; 6 January 1964 (age 62) Treuenbrietzen, East Germany
- Height: 1.89 m (6 ft 2 1/2 in)
- Weight: Light Heavyweight

Boxing career
- Stance: Southpaw

Boxing record
- Total fights: 32
- Wins: 31
- Win by KO: 11
- Losses: 1

Henry Maske
Medal record

Representing East Germany

Men's boxing

Olympic Games
Gold medal – first place	1988 Seoul	Middleweight

World Amateur Championships
Gold medal – first place	1989 Moscow	Light Heavyweight
Silver medal – second place	1986 Reno	Middleweight

European Amateur Championships
Bronze medal – third place	1983 Varna	Middleweight
Gold medal – first place	1985 Budapest	Middleweight
Gold medal – first place	1987 Turin	Middleweight
Gold medal – first place	1989 Athens	Middleweight

Henry Maske (German pronunciation: [ˈhɛnʁi ˈmaskə], audio; born 6 January 1964) is a German former professional boxer and one of Germany's most popular sports figures. He held the IBF light heavyweight title from 1993 until 1996.

== Amateur career ==
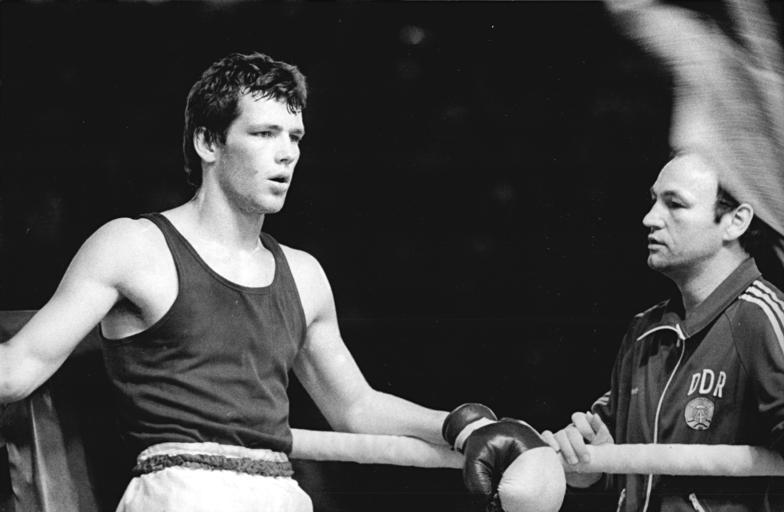
Maske (left) and Manfred Wolke in 1983

Maske was born in Treuenbrietzen, Bezirk Potsdam. He was an Olympic Gold medallist 1988 in Seoul (middleweight) for East Germany. His results were:

=== Olympic results ===
Below is the record of Henry Maske, an East German middleweight boxer who competed at the 1988 Seoul Olympics:

- Round of 64: bye
- Round of 32: Defeated Helman Palije (Malawi) by decision, 5–0
- Round of 16: Defeated Sello Mojela (Lesotho) by walkover
- Quarterfinal: Defeated Michele Mastrodonato (Italy) by decision, 5–0
- Semifinal: Defeated Chris Sande (Kenya) by decision, 5–0
- Final: Defeated Egerton Marcus (Canada) by decision, 5–0 (won gold medal)

Maske won the 1989 World Amateur Boxing Championships in Moscow and the silver medal at the 1986 World Amateur Boxing Championships in Reno, Nevada. His toughest opponents were Cubans, particularly Angel Espinosa, whom he met three times in 1987–1988, losing all three by a 0–5 unanimous decision, and luckily for him, Maske didn't met Espinosa at Seoul as Cuba boycotted the 1988 Olympics.

== Professional career ==
During his career, Maske was a five-time boxing champion of East Germany. After reunification in 1990, he turned professional, and became the IBF world title holder in the light heavyweight category on 20 March 1993. Maske defended his title ten times between 1993 and 1996.

He retired in 1996 after suffering a split decision loss at the hands of Virgil Hill. In 2007, he won in a rematch.

== Post-boxing life ==
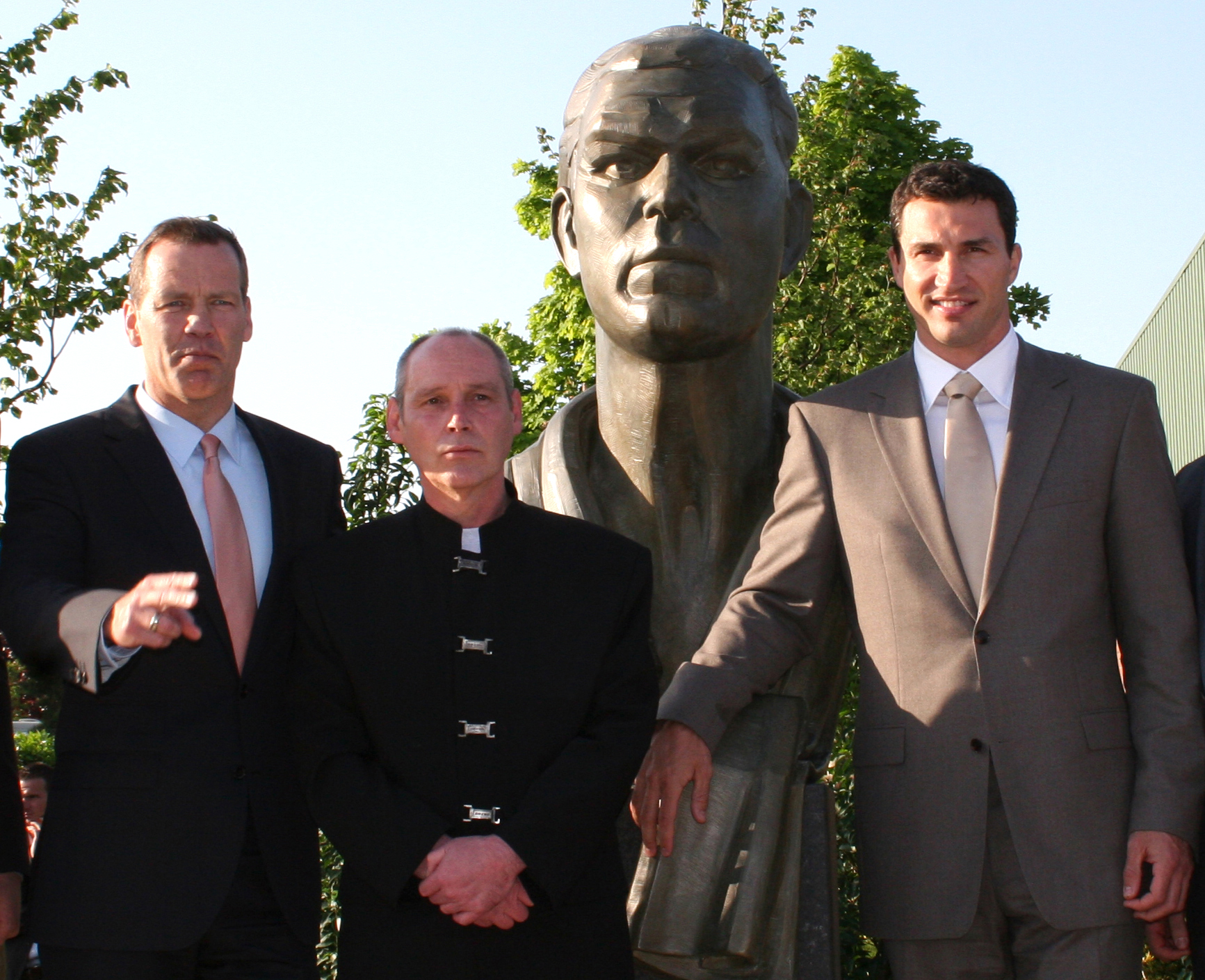
Maske (left) and Wladimir Klitschko (right) with German sculptor Carsten Eggers, after the unveiling of the Max Schmeling monument in Hollenstedt on 21 May 2010

As of 2010, Maske owns ten McDonald's franchises in Germany. Maske works as a boxing commentator for the first German television channel (ARD).

== Comeback ==
After an 11-year retirement, he avenged his only defeat as a professional against Virgil Hill. The fight was held on 31 March 2007, in Munich; Maske won by unanimous decision after 12 rounds.

== Professional boxing record ==
32 fights	31 wins	1 loss
By knockout	11	0
By decision	19	1
By disqualification	1	0

No.	Result	Record	Opponent	Type	Round, time	Date	Location	Notes
32	Win	31–1	Virgil Hill	UD	12	31 Mar 2007	Munich, Germany	
31	Loss	30–1	Virgil Hill	SD	12	23 Nov 1996	Munich, Germany	Lost IBF light heavyweight title; For WBA light heavyweight title
30	Win	30–0	John Scully	UD	12	25 May 1996	Leipzig, Germany	Retained IBF light heavyweight title
29	Win	29–0	Duran Williams	UD	12	17 Feb 1996	Dortmund, Germany	Retained IBF light heavyweight title
28	Win	28–0	Graciano Rocchigiani	UD	12	14 Oct 1995	Munich, Germany	Retained IBF light heavyweight title
27	Win	27–0	Graciano Rocchigiani	UD	12	27 May 1995	Dortmund, Germany	Retained IBF light heavyweight title
26	Win	26–0	Egerton Marcus	UD	12	11 Feb 1995	Frankfurt, Germany	Retained IBF light heavyweight title
25	Win	25–0	Iran Barkley	RTD	9 (12), 3:00	8 Oct 1994	Halle, Germany	Retained IBF light heavyweight title
24	Win	24–0	Andrea Magi	UD	12	4 Jun 1994	Dortmund, Germany	Retained IBF light heavyweight title
23	Win	23–0	Ernesto Magdaleno	TKO	9 (12)	26 Mar 1994	Dortmund, Germany	Retained IBF light heavyweight title
22	Win	22–0	David Vedder	UD	12	11 Dec 1993	Düsseldorf, Germany	Retained IBF light heavyweight title
21	Win	21–0	Anthony Hembrick	UD	12	18 Sep 1993	Düsseldorf, Germany	Retained IBF light heavyweight title
20	Win	20–0	Charles Williams	UD	12	20 Mar 1993	Düsseldorf, Germany	Won IBF light heavyweight title
19	Win	19–0	Frank Minton	KO	2 (?)	2 Oct 1992	Berlin, Germany	
18	Win	18–0	Samson Cohen	RTD	5 (8), 3:00	19 Sep 1992	Kassel, Germany	
17	Win	17–0	Lenzie Morgan	PTS	10	27 Jun 1992	Halle, Germany	
16	Win	16–0	Steve McCarthy	DQ	9 (10)	4 Apr 1992	Düsseldorf, Germany	
15	Win	15–0	Leslie Stewart	KO	7 (10)	6 Mar 1992	Berlin, Germany	
14	Win	14–0	Tom Elton Collins	TKO	8 (10), 1:35	6 Dec 1991	Düsseldorf, Germany	
13	Win	13–0	Darryl Fromm	KO	2 (8)	8 Nov 1991	Paris, France	
12	Win	12–0	Mike Peak	KO	9 (?)	12 Oct 1991	Halle, Germany	
11	Win	11–0	Rodrigo Benech	UD	8	13 Sep 1991	Düsseldorf, Germany	
10	Win	10–0	Yawe Davis	PTS	10	31 May 1991	Berlin, Germany	
9	Win	9–0	Miguel Angel Maldonado	PTS	8	28 Feb 1991	Düsseldorf, Germany	
8	Win	8–0	Salim Muhammad	PTS	8	25 Jan 1991	Hollywood, Florida, U.S.	
7	Win	7–0	Glazz Campbell	PTS	8	7 Dec 1990	Berlin, Germany	
6	Win	6–0	Sean Mannion	PTS	8	16 Nov 1990	Hamburg, Germany	
5	Win	5–0	Cordwell Hylton	TKO	3 (6), 2:44	31 Oct 1990	London, England	
4	Win	4–0	Mike Brothers	KO	2 (?)	5 Oct 1990	Düsseldorf, Germany	
3	Win	3–0	Jorge Juan Salgado	PTS	6	7 Sep 1990	West Berlin, West Germany	
2	Win	2–0	Mike Aubrey	PTS	6	1 Jun 1990	Düsseldorf, West Germany	
1	Win	1–0	Antonio Arvizu	KO	1 (6)	9 May 1990	London, England	

== Television viewership ==
=== Germany ===
Date	Fight	Viewership (avg.)	Source(s)
20 March 1993	Henry Maske vs. Charles Williams	3,100,000	
11 February 1995	Henry Maske vs. Egerton Marcus	11,000,000	
27 May 1995	Henry Maske vs. Graciano Rocchigiani I	13,180,000	
14 October 1995	Henry Maske vs. Graciano Rocchigiani II	17,590,000	
17 February 1996	Henry Maske vs. Duran Williams	15,030,000	
25 May 1996	Henry Maske vs. John Scully	12,360,000	
23 November 1996	Henry Maske vs. Virgil Hill I	17,500,000	
31 March 2007	Henry Maske vs. Virgil Hill II	15,990,000	
	Total viewership	105,750,000	

== Acting ==
Maske played the lead role in the 2010 biopic Max Schmeling, for which he took several months of acting lessons. However, critique were largely negative on his performance in the film.

Awards
Preceded by (Germany) Dieter Baumann	German Sportsman of the Year; 1993	Succeeded by (Germany) Markus Wasmeier
Achievements
Preceded by (United States) Charles Williams	IBF Light Heavyweight Champion; 1993-03-20 – 1996-11-23	Succeeded by (United States) Virgil Hill
