= Kim Jong-il (long jumper) =

South Korean long jumper (born 1962)

Personal information
- Born: 11 September 1962 (age 64) Jincheon, South Korea

Sport
- Sport: Track and field
Medal record
Representing South Korea
Asian Games
Gold medal – first place	1982 New Delhi	Long jump
Gold medal – first place	1986 Seoul	Long jump
Bronze medal – third place	1986 Seoul	4x100 m
Asian Championships
Bronze medal – third place	1981 Tokyo	4×100 m
Bronze medal – third place	1983 Kuwait City	4×100 m

Kim Jong-il (Korean: 김종일; Hanja: 金鍾鎰, born 11 September 1962), sometimes transliterated Kim Yong-il, is a South Korean retired long jumper, best known for winning two gold medals at the Asian Games. He also competed in the Olympics twice, and was the first Korean athlete to have made a final round at the Olympics. His personal best jump was 8.00 metres, achieved in August 1988 in Seoul. After retiring as an active athlete, he turned to a career in coaching and academics.

== Athletics career ==
Kim Jong-il was born on 11 September 1962, and is a native of Jincheon. He became a member of the national track and field team in 1979, and first made his mark internationally by winning the gold medal in long jump at the 1982 Asian Games in New Delhi. His jump of 7.94 metres was the second best Asian Games result of all times, only behind T.C. Yohannan's winning jump of 8.07 metres in 1974. Kim beat second-placed Liu Yuhuang with a slim margin of five centimetres, and third-placed Junichi Usui with seven centimetres.

Two years later, Kim participated in the Olympic Games in Los Angeles. Entering the qualifying round at the long jump competition, where one would need to finish among the top twelve or achieve at least 7.90 metres to reach the final, Kim began his competition with a non-valid jump. His second jump measured 7.67 metres, in a head wind of 2.5 m/s, which was not enough to progress. However, with his final qualifying jump measuring 7.87 metres, he finished ninth in total, thus making it to the finals—together with fellow Asians Junichi Usui (8.02 m) and Liu Yuhuang (7.83 m). In the final round, Kim opened with jumps of 7.76 and 7.81 metres. The latter jump ranked him in eighth place, the threshold necessary to get a further three jumps after the first three. Failing to capitalize on this opportunity, with two jumps of 7.77 and 7.59 as well as two fouls he remained in eighth place. Nonetheless, he was the first Korean track and field athlete to have made a final round at the Olympics.

In January 1985, Kim competed at the inaugural World Indoor Games in Paris. Here, he finished in eleventh place with 7.31 metres. Only four days earlier he had jumped 7.84 metres in a meet in Osaka. In 1986, Kim would try to defend his gold medal in the 1986 Asian Games, which was this time staged in Seoul in his home country. Kim again jumped 7.94 metres, which was enough to win the gold medal, two centimetres ahead of Junichi Usui and fourteen ahead of Chen Zunrong. Kim also entered as a part of the South Korean 4 x 100 metres relay team, and eventually won a bronze medal. In 1986 to 1987 he had lived in the United States to train with the Houston Cougars under the University of Houston.

In August 1988, Kim achieved his lifetime best result, jumping 8.00 metres in a pre-Olympic meet in Seoul. The Olympic Games were staged in the same city the next month. Kim once again entered in the long jump competition. His series of 7.36, 7.68 and 7.70 metres placed him sixteenth in total, thus he failed to reach the final round this time. The last qualifier for the final was 7.77 metres; the only Asian athlete who reached the final round was Chinese Pang Yan. Among those who failed to reach the final were Chen Zunrong, Junichi Usui (with three fouls) as well as two Canadians who would become 1996 Olympic champions in the relay: Bruny Surin and Glenroy Gilbert.

Kim then participated without success at the 1989 World Indoor Championships. His last major international competition was the 1990 Asian Games in Beijing. Here, he placed fourth in the long jump.

== Coaching and academic career ==
Kim took an undergraduate degree in physical education at Dong-A University in 1986. Having later relocated to the United States, he took the master's degree at the Washington State University in 1993. He remained there to complete his doctor's thesis in 1996. In the 1997-98 academic year, Kim was employed at Calvin College, where he doubled as professor in the Health, Physical Education, Recreation, Dance and Sport department as well as head coach of the men's track and field team. In 2002 he also took over the post as head coach for the women's team. Kim stepped away from coaching track & field after the 2010 season.

His honors as a coach include the selection as NCAA Division III National Women's Coach of the Year in 2002 and 2003. In 2003 he was also named Men's Coach of the Year; he was the first coach to win both awards in the same year.
