= Henry Maske vs. Iran Barkley =

Boxing match

- Date: 8 October 1994
- Venue: Gerry Weber Stadion, Halle, North Rhine-Westphalia, Germany
- Title(s) on the line: IBF light heavyweight title

Tale of the tape
Boxer	Henry Maske	Iran Barkley
Nickname	Gentleman	The Blade
Hometown	Cologne, North Rhine-Westphalia, Germany	The Bronx, New York, U.S.
Pre-fight record	24–0 (10 KO)	33–9 (20 KO)
Age	30 years, 9 months	34 years, 5 months
Height	6 ft 2 1/2 in (189 cm)	6 ft 1 in (185 cm)
Weight	174 lb (79 kg)	172 lb (78 kg)
Style	Southpaw	Orthodox
Recognition	IBF; Light Heavyweight Champion; The Ring; No. 3 Ranked Light Heavyweight	IBF; No. 7 Ranked Light Heavyweight; 3-division world champion

Result
- Maske wins via 9th-round RTD

Henry Maske vs. Iran Barkley was a professional boxing match contested on 8 October 1994, for the IBF light heavyweight title.

== Background ==
Iran Barkley's last title match had occurred the previous February when he defended his IBF super middleweight against James Toney. Toney dominated Barkley, winning every round, before the fight was called off after the ninth round, giving Toney a victory by referee technical decision. Forced to go down the comeback trail, Barkley, now fighting as a heavyweight, landed a fight against light heavyweight contender Adolpho Washington that was broadcast nationally on ESPN on October 20, 1993. Barkley struggled against Washington and by the sixth round, his left eye was swollen shut forcing the referee to stop the fight and award Washington the victory.

Following the loss to Washington, Barkley joined forces with former heavyweight champion Tommy Morrison in April 1994 to start the Tulsa, Oklahoma-based boxing promotional firm aptly named Team Tulsa. Barkley, fighting as a cruiserweight, won his first fight as a member of Team Tulsa, easily dispatching Rick Enis via fourth-round knockout. Following this victory, Barkley was offered a title shot against the undefeated reigning IBF light heavyweight Henry Maske to take place in October 1994 in Maske's native Germany provided Barkley first win his scheduled match against Gary Butler. Barkley would defeat Butler on July 22, 1994, officially putting the Maske–Barkley fight on. Though Maske was a perfect 24–0, he was largely unknown in the United States with his most notable opponent being Charles Williams, whom he had defeated in March 1993 to capture the IBF light heavyweight title. Barkley was unimpressed with the little-known Maske stating "I've seen the tape. What I saw was an out-of-shape Prince Charles. I'll take care of this guy."

The now-34-year-old Barkley, who had to drop 15 pounds to get down from cruiserweight back to light heavyweight, was given little chance to defeat Maske by both his home country and Germany. Las Vegas oddsmakers made Barkley a sizeable 10–1 underdog, while German media, Barkley claimed, had derided him as "soft and washed up" when he had visited the country for a press tour to promote the fight. Despite this, Barkley remained confident in his abilities, proclaiming to the media, "Every big fight I've been in, I've been the underdog. I never have cared what anyone else thinks of me. Maske knows what I'm about, he knows my style. I'll jump on him like a grizzly bear and see if he can take it. I don't think he can."

== The fight ==
A badly outmatched Barkley struggled to keep up with Maske and had trouble landing any offense on the champion while Maske landed punches almost at will. Much like his last title fight against Toney, Barkley lost every round as Maske dominated the fight, opening up a big gash on Barkley's lip and hammering him with punches that completely shut his left eye. After Maske had a dominating ninth round in which Barkley offered little offensively or defensively, Barkley's trainer Tommy Virgets informed Barkley that he would stop the fight. Though Barkley insisted on continuing the fight, he was overruled and the fight was stopped with Maske named the winner by technical decision.

== Aftermath ==
Ultimately the fight would prove to be Barkley's final title shot.

== Fight card ==
Confirmed bouts:

Weight Class	Weight		vs.		Method	Round	Notes
Light Heavyweight	175 lbs.	Henry Maske (c)	def	Iran Barkley	RTD	9/12	^{Note 1}
Super Welterweight	154 lbs.	Salvador Yanez	def.	Reiner Gies	TKO	2/10
Heavyweight	200+ lbs.	Željko Mavrović	def.	Marion Wilson	PTS	8/8

^Note 1 For IBF light heavyweight title

== Broadcasting ==
Country	Broadcaster
Germany	RTL
United States	Prime Network

Preceded by vs. Andrea Magi	Henry Maske's bouts 8 October 1994	Succeeded by vs. Egerton Marcus
Preceded by vs. Gary Butler	Iran Barkley's bouts 8 October 1994	Succeeded by vs. Tosca Petridis
