= 1987 European Amateur Boxing Championships =

Boxing competitions

- Host city: Turin
- Country: Italy
- Nations: 25
- Athletes: 178
- Dates: 28 May–7 June

The Men's 1987 European Amateur Boxing Championships were held in Turin, Italy, from 28 May to 7 June. The 27th edition of the bi-annual competition was organised by the European governing body for amateur boxing, EABA. There were 178 fighters from 25 countries participating.

== Medal winners ==
Event	(gold) GOLD	(silver) SILVER	(bronze) BRONZE
Light Flyweight (– 48 kilograms)	Nshan Munchyan; Soviet Union	Krasimir Cholakov; Bulgaria	Adrian Amzer; Romania (Socialist Federal Republic of Yugoslavia) Dragan Zivadinović; Yugoslavia
Flyweight (– 51 kilograms)	Andreas Tews; East Germany	János Váradi; Hungary	Andrea Mannai; Italy Johnny Bredahl; Denmark
Bantamweight (– 54 kilograms)	Aleksandar Khristov; Bulgaria	Yuri Alexandrov; Soviet Union	René Breitbarth; East Germany Jimmy Majanya; Sweden
Featherweight (– 57 kilograms)	Mikhail Kazaryan; Soviet Union	László Szöke; Hungary	Regilio Tuur; Netherlands Jarmo Eskelinen; Finland
Lightweight (– 60 kilograms)	Orzubek Nazarov; Soviet Union	Emil Chuprenski; Bulgaria	Daniel Maeran; Romania Michele Caldarella; Italy
Light Welterweight (– 63.5 kilograms)	Borislav Abadzhiev; Bulgaria	Vyacheslav Yanovski; Soviet Union	Søren Søndergaard; Denmark Reimo van der Hoeck; Netherlands
Welterweight (– 67 kilograms)	Vassili Shyshov; Soviet Union	Siegfried Mehnert; East Germany	(Socialist Federal Republic of Yugoslavia) Đorđe Petronijević; Yugoslavia Angel Stoyanov; Bulgaria
Light Middleweight (– 71 kilograms)	Enrico Richter; East Germany	Viktor Yegorov; Soviet Union	Neville Brown; England Marian Gavrila; Romania
Middleweight (– 75 kilograms)	Henry Maske; East Germany	Henryk Petrich; Poland	Ruslan Taramov; Soviet Union Esa Hukkanen; Finland
Light Heavyweight (– 81 kilograms)	Yuri Vaulin; Soviet Union	Rene Ryl; East Germany	Andrea Magi; Italy Ahmet Canbakış; Turkey
Heavyweight (– 91 kilograms)	Arnold Vanderlyde; Netherlands	Ramzan Sebiyev; Soviet Union	Svilen Rusinov; Bulgaria Luigi Gaudiano; Italy
Super Heavyweight (+ 91 kilograms)	Ulli Kaden; East Germany	Alexander Yagubkin; Soviet Union	Biaggio Chianese; Italy Petar Stoymenov; Bulgaria

== Medal table ==
Rank	Nation	Gold	Silver	Bronze	Total
1	Soviet Union (URS)	5	5	1	11
2	East Germany (GDR)	4	2	1	7
3	Bulgaria (BUL)	2	2	3	7
4	Netherlands (NED)	1	0	2	3
5	Hungary (HUN)	0	2	0	2
6	Poland (POL)	0	1	0	1
7	Italy (ITA)	0	0	5	5
8	Romania (ROU)	0	0	3	3
9	Denmark (DEN)	0	0	2	2
9	Finland (FIN)	0	0	2	2
9	Yugoslavia (YUG)	0	0	2	2
12	England (ENG)	0	0	1	1
12	Sweden (SWE)	0	0	1	1
12	Turkey (TUR)	0	0	1	1
Totals (14 entries)		12	12	24	48
