= Magdaleno =

Magdaleno is a both a surname and a given name of Spanish origin. Notable people with the name include:

- Bryan Magdaleno (born 2001), Dominican baseball player
- Diego Magdaleno (born 1986), American boxer
- Enrique Magdaleno (born 1955), Spanish footballer
- Ernesto Magdaleno (1962–1995), American boxer
- Jesús Magdaleno (born 1991), American boxer
- María Herrera Magdaleno, Mexican businesswoman and human rights activist
- Magdaleno Cano (1933–2009), Mexican cyclist
- Magdaleno Mercado (born 1944), Mexican boxer
