= James Iahuat =

Vanuatuan boxer (1959–2021)

James Iahuat (14 May 1959 – 20 June 2021) was a boxer who represented Vanuatu. Iahuat competed at the 1986 Commonwealth Games in Edinburgh. There, he lost his only bout to George Ferrie of Scotland after the referee stopped the contest in the second round.

At the 1988 Summer Olympics held in Seoul, Iahuat again competed in the middleweight class. He received a bye in the first round. In the second round he was up against Zairean boxer Serge Kabongo, but the referee stopped the contest in the first round. Four years later Iahuat became the Vanuatu National boxing coach.
