= Ernesto Magdaleno =

American professional boxer

Ernesto "Ernie" Magdaleno (December 29, 1962 – December 31, 1995) was an American professional boxer.

== Life and career ==
Magdaleno, who attended Westminster High School, was of Mexican origin. He participated in only eleven amateur fights.

His first fight as a professional boxer came in November 1989, when he defeated Steve Montoya in Irvine, California. On February 24, 1992, Magdaleno won the California State Light-Heavyweight title by knocking out Bomani Parker in round five. After having won all of his first 15 bouts as a professional, Magdaleno had a draw against Mexican Lupe Aquino in February 1993. Later that year, Magdaleno held off Tim Hillie to claim the IBF USBA Light-Heavyweight title.

Until 1993, Magdaleno was promoted by Don King. His manager and trainer was Clyde Armijo. Magdaleno was sitting in first place in the IBF World ranking, when taking on German Henry Maske, the reigning IBF Light-Heavyweight World champion, on March 26, 1994. German newspaper Hamburger Abendblatt described Magdaleno as a "tough fighter with limited technical skills". Fighting in front of a sell-out crowd of 13,500 in Dortmund's Westfalenhalle, Magdaleno dominated the early stages of the bout, before being stopped by T/KO in round nine, after having suffered a cut above the eye. After the fight, Magdaleno's opponent Maske called the bout his most difficult world championship fight so far.

Following the title fight in Germany, Magdaleno won the last three bouts of his professional career. His overall record was 21 wins (8 by KO), one loss and one draw. Besides boxing, he worked as a carpenter and carpet layer. Magdaleno died on December 31, 1995, only three days after his last fight. At this time, he was ranked fifth in the world by the World Boxing Association. Driving in Huntington Beach, California, Magdaleno's car was hit by a vehicle, which fled from police. His wife and two children sustained minor injuries in the crash, while Magdaleno was thrown out of the car following the impact.
