= Lamar Parks =

American boxer (born 1970)

Personal information
- Nickname: Kidfire
- Nationality: American
- Born: Lamar Eugene Parks; March 17, 1970 (age 56)
- Height: 5 ft 7 1/2 in (171 cm)
- Weight: Light middleweight; Middleweight; Super middleweight

Boxing career

Boxing record
- Total fights: 28
- Wins: 27
- Win by KO: 21
- Losses: 1

Lamar Eugene Parks (born March 17, 1970) is an American former professional boxer who competed from 1988 to 1993. He challenged for the WBA middleweight title in 1992, but was forced to retire from the sport the following year after testing positive for HIV.

Parks had a successful amateur career, winning multiple regional titles and reaching the semifinals of the 1988 Olympic Trials. After making his professional debut in 1988, he collected minor titles from the WBC and IBF en route to a 22-fight win streak to begin his career. In 1992, he unsuccessfully challenged Reggie Johnson for his WBA middleweight title, losing by unanimous decision. Consequently, Parks won five consecutive bouts in 1993 to earn another world title fight against Gerald McClellan, but was barred from competing when it was revealed he had contracted HIV.

Parks was inducted into the Carolinas Boxing Hall of Fame as a member of the class of 2024.

== Early life ==
Parks was born on March 17, 1970. His family moved to Greenville, South Carolina when he was three years old. His father, David, resisted the idea of his son fighting because he was afraid he would get hurt, but he eventually let him train under Silas Epps at the Phillis Wheatley Community Center in 1983. David was a former amateur boxer who had to cut his career short due to rheumatic fever; he eventually quit his job at Duke Power to help train his son.

Parks made his amateur debut at the age of 13, scoring a second-round knockout. Within a year, he became the South Carolina state champion in his age group. In 1984 he reached the semifinals of a regional Junior Olympic tournament in Sumter, South Carolina, then won a gold medal at the Palmetto State Games. In 1985 he returned to the same Junior Olympic tournament in Atlanta, taking first place and qualifying for the National Junior Olympics. He won the Southern Golden Gloves title at light middleweight in 1986. At the 1987 Southern Golden Gloves, Parks captured the middleweight title and was named the best boxer of the tournament. He was named best boxer again the following year after winning yet another Southern title. He also reached the semifinals of the 1988 Olympic Trials, where he lost a decision to John Scully of New England. Parks won 175 of his 188 amateur bouts, claiming five South Carolina Golden Gloves championships and three Southeast regional titles.

Parks graduated from Greenville High School and briefly studied electronics engineering at Greenville Technical College.

== Professional career ==
Parks made his professional debut on October 4, 1988, defeating Lennell Stroman by unanimous decision (UD) in Atlantic City, New Jersey. His father doubled as his manager and trainer, but he also brought along his childhood trainer Silas Epps. Parks defeated former National Golden Gloves champion Fabian Williams in his fourth pro bout, losing the opening four rounds before stopping Williams in the fifth. In his tenth fight, he defeated Chris Sande by fifth-round technical knockout (TKO) to hand the 1988 Olympic bronze medallist his first pro defeat. Parks quit the sport following the win due to his discouragement over a lack of exposure and opportunities, but returned about six months later. He connected with a friend in Memphis, Tennessee, where he met Madison Square Garden promoter Bobby Goodman and was able to secure a one-year deal.

After 16 straight wins to start his career, Parks captured the vacant WBC Continental Americas middleweight title when he scored a UD victory over Lenzie Morgan on July 6, 1991 in his hometown of Greenville, South Carolina. He then stopped Donny Giron five months later via sixth-round TKO for the vacant WBC–NABF middleweight title. In his next fight, he knocked out two-time Olympian Francisco de Jesus in a lopsided bout in New York City to improve his record to 20–0. On April 16, 1992, Parks defeated Percy Harris to retain his NABF belt and win the vacant IBF–USBA middleweight title, forcing a referee stoppage in the tenth round. By this time he was ranked as the second-best middleweight in the world by the WBC, as well as the fourth-best by both the WBA and IBF.

On October 27, 1992, a 22-year-old Parks challenged Reggie Johnson for the WBA middleweight title at The Summit in Houston, losing the fight by unanimous decision. Johnson preferred the more lucrative title defense against Roy Jones Jr., but Parks forced the fight as the WBA's No. 1 contender and earned a reported $40,000 in his first career defeat. In a 2015 interview with The Ring, Johnson called Parks the best puncher and the best jabber he ever faced. On August 10, 1993, Parks defeated Gilbert Baptist in his hometown of Greenville for the vacant WBC Continental Americas middleweight title, forcing his opponent's trainer to throw in the towel in the 11th round after landing 18 straight punches. He stopped Joaquín Velásquez in four rounds in a tune-up fight in Atlantic City that November. This would end up being the final fight of his career, finishing with a 27–1 record with 21 knockouts.

Now ranked as the No. 1 contender by all three major sanctioning organizations (WBC, WBA and IBF), Parks positioned himself as the mandatory challenger for Gerald McClellan's WBC middleweight title. He was also the mandatory challenger for Roy Jones Jr.'s IBF middleweight title, though they were reportedly reluctant to face each other due to the fact that they were childhood sparring partners and remained good friends. The Parks–McClellan world title bout was announced as a part of a Don King-promoted card at the MGM Grand Garden Arena in Las Vegas to be held on March 4, 1994, with Parks set to make over $150,000. They were slated to be the main event on a card with five world title bouts, and Parks relocated to Fort Pierce, Florida for training camp in January. However, he pulled out of the fight for unspecified medical reasons and a contract was sent to undefeated middleweight contender Otis Grant instead. Before Grant's camp could respond to the offer, Parks claimed to have recovered from a shoulder injury he had apparently suffered in training. He even passed a physical in mid-February to indicate the fight was back on. Just few days later though, Parks pulled out yet again after supposedly re-injuring the same shoulder on the day before he was supposed to leave for the fight. His last-minute replacement, Gilbert Baptist, was stopped by McClellan in 97 seconds in Las Vegas and immediately announced his retirement following the loss. Parks stayed silent over the following months, refusing to talk to the media or even his promoters. He became withdrawn and stopped going to the gym as rumors circulated in the boxing world.

=== HIV diagnosis ===
He was a terribly ambitious kid when it came to his goals in the ring and in life. He was just beginning to realize his potential. Nobody knows how much potential the kid really has. He was almost a millionaire and lost it all. In fact, we all lost.

— His promoter, Bobby Goodman

He was strong, the strongest I’d ever seen. All we had to work on was speed. When his daddy came down here, I said, "You got yourself a champion." And it would have happened. That’s what he would have been.”

— His trainer, Silas Epps

On August 27, 1994, Samantha Clark, Parks' ex-fiancee, died in Greenville at the age of 23 due to complications with AIDS; she weighed 64 pounds. In an interview with The State nine days before her death, Clark said Parks was the only man she had ever been with and accused him of giving her the virus. She decided to go public with her condition in order to protect other women, with Clark's mother calling him a "deadly weapon" who had to be stopped. The couple had begun dating in November 1990 and became engaged in February 1992, moving in together later that year. According to Clark's mother, Parks had other girlfriends. Clark occasionally saw him around town with other women, but she remained with him. In June 1993, Clark tested positive for HIV and informed Parks over the phone, since he was in New York City training for a fight at the time. He replied that she should ignore the results because the doctors "[didn't] know what they're talking about." He fought three more times after this; HIV tests were not mandatory for these because they were not major title fights. In February 1994, Parks tested positive himself during a routine medical test in Florida in the lead-up to the McClellan fight. He had a friend take a second test under his name back in Greenville, where proof of identification was not required. However, he did not travel to Las Vegas because Nevada requested a second test done by their own doctors, so his team fabricated a shoulder injury and pulled him out of the fight.

Just over a month after Clark's death, Parks' father confirmed that his son's career was over. He was the most notable of a recent string of professional boxers to have tested positive for HIV, such as Proud Kilimanjaro and Rubén Darío Palacio. Randy Gordon, commissioner of the New York State Athletic Commission, said that he hoped the situation increased AIDS awareness in the boxing community and led to more testing requirements. In 1995, Parks was reported to be living in a small town near Greenville and running a small business.

== Professional boxing record ==
28 fights	27 wins	1 loss
By knockout	21	0
By decision	6	1

No.	Result	Record	Opponent	Type	Round, time	Date	Location	Notes
28	Win	27–1	(Dominican Republic) Joaquín Velásquez	TKO	4 (10), 1:04	Nov 2, 1993	(United States) Merv Griffin's Resorts in Atlantic City, New Jersey, U.S.	
27	Win	26–1	(United States) Gilbert Baptist	TKO	11 (12), 0:55	Aug 10, 1993	(United States) Memorial Auditorium, Greenville, South Carolina, U.S.	Won vacant WBC Continental Americas middleweight title
26	Win	25–1	(Puerto Rico) Danny García	UD	10	Jun 24, 1993	(United States) Paramount Theatre, New York City, New York, U.S.	
25	Win	24–1	(United States) Willie Kemp	TKO	5 (10), 0:56	Mar 18, 1993	(United States) Paramount Theatre, New York City, New York, U.S.	
24	Win	23–1	(United States) Ricky Thomas	UD	10	Jan 27, 1993	(United States) Paramount Theatre, New York City, New York, U.S.	
23	Loss	22–1	(United States) Reggie Johnson	UD	12	Oct 27, 1992	(United States) The Summit, Houston, Texas, U.S.	For WBA middleweight title
22	Win	22–0	(Mexico) José Luis López	TKO	1 (10), 2:29	Jun 26, 1992	(United States) King Street Palace, Charleston, South Carolina, U.S.	
21	Win	21–0	(United States) Percy Harris	TKO	10 (12), 2:50	Apr 16, 1992	(United States) Paramount Theatre, New York City, New York, U.S.	Retained WBC–NABF middleweight title; Won vacant IBF–USBA middleweight title
20	Win	20–0	(Brazil) Francisco de Jesus	KO	3 (10), 0:48	Feb 18, 1992	(United States) Paramount Theatre, New York City, New York, U.S.	
19	Win	19–0	(United States) Donny Giron	TKO	6 (12), 1:27	Dec 5, 1991	(United States) Memorial Auditorium, Greenville, South Carolina, U.S.	Won vacant WBC–NABF middleweight title
18	Win	18–0	(United States) Ken Hulsey	TKO	1 (10), 2:56	Nov 15, 1991	(United States) King Street Palace, Charleston, South Carolina, U.S.	
17	Win	17–0	(United States) Lenzie Morgan	UD	12	Jul 6, 1991	(United States) Memorial Auditorium, Greenville, South Carolina, U.S.	Won vacant WBC Continental Americas middleweight title
16	Win	16–0	(United States) Lester Yarbrough	UD	10	Jun 15, 1991	(United States) King Street Palace, Charleston, South Carolina, U.S.	
15	Win	15–0	(Colombia) Brinatty Maquilon	UD	10	May 10, 1991	(United States) Central Maine Civic Center, Lewiston, Maine, U.S.	
14	Win	14–0	(United States) Eric Rhinehart	TKO	3 (10), 0:31	Mar 1, 1991	(United States) King Street Palace, Charleston, South Carolina, U.S.	
13	Win	13–0	(United States) Eric Cole	KO	2 (8), 1:25	Dec 21, 1990	(United States) Sands Hotel and Casino, Paradise, Nevada, U.S.	
12	Win	12–0	(Venezuela) Basante Blanco	TKO	2 (8), 2:44	Nov 9, 1990	(United States) Central Maine Civic Center, Lewiston, Maine, U.S.	
11	Win	11–0	(United States) Lemorrah Bolding	TKO	3 (8), 1:16	Oct 23, 1990	(United States) The Aladdin, Paradise, Nevada, U.S.	
10	Win	10–0	(Kenya) Chris Sande	TKO	5 (6)	Apr 29, 1990	(United States) Caesars Hotel and Casino, Atlantic City, New Jersey, U.S.	
9	Win	9–0	(United States) Tony Wellington	TKO	1 (?), 2:35	Feb 28, 1990	(United States) Interstate Fairgrounds, Pensacola, Florida, U.S.	
8	Win	8–0	(United States) William Pinto	TKO	1 (?)	Nov 24, 1989	(United States) Memorial Auditorium, Greenville, South Carolina, U.S.	
7	Win	7–0	(United States) Carlton Brown	KO	4 (?)	Oct 28, 1989	(United States) South Carolina, U.S.	
6	Win	6–0	(United States) Dwight Hunter	TKO	3 (?)	Oct 4, 1989	(United States) Charlotte Motor Speedway, Concord, North Carolina, U.S.	
5	Win	5–0	(United States) Fabian Williams	TKO	5 (6), 2:00	Jun 24, 1989	(United States) Convention Center, Atlantic City, New Jersey, U.S.	
4	Win	4–0	(United States) Ed Barnes	KO	4 (?)	Apr 22, 1989	(United States) Trump Castle, Atlantic City, New Jersey, U.S.	
3	Win	3–0	(United States) Bobby Bell	TKO	3 (4), 2:43	Mar 3, 1989	(United States) Lake County Expo Center, Eustis, Florida, U.S.	
2	Win	2–0	(United States) Charles Agnew	TKO	2 (4)	Nov 28, 1988	(United States) Memorial Auditorium, Greenville, South Carolina, U.S.	
1	Win	1–0	(United States) Lennell Stroman	UD	4	Oct 4, 1988	(United States) Atlantis Hotel and Casino, Atlantic City, New Jersey, U.S.	
