= Athletics at the 1988 Summer Olympics – Men's long jump =

Men's long jump at the Games of the XXIV Olympiad
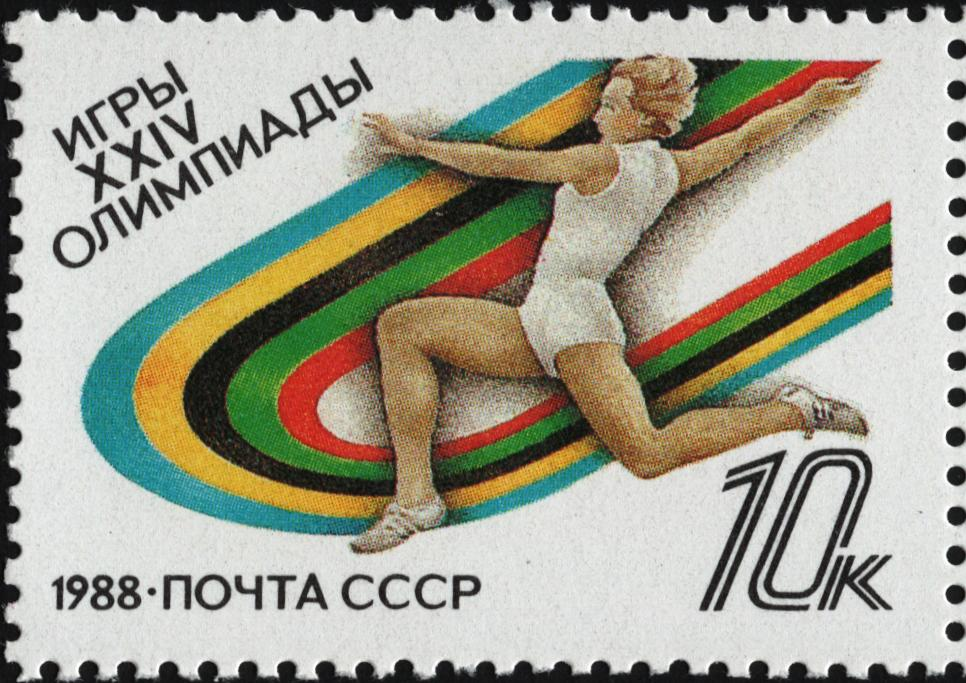
- Soviet stamp showing 1988 Olympic long jump
- Venue: Olympic Stadium
- Dates: 24 September 1988 (qualifying); 25 September 1988 (final)
- Competitors: 41 from 31 nations
- Winning distance: 8.72

Medalists
1st place, gold medalist(s)		Carl Lewis; United States
2nd place, silver medalist(s)		Mike Powell; United States
3rd place, bronze medalist(s)		Larry Myricks; United States

Official Video Highlights

The men's long jump at the 1988 Summer Olympics in Seoul, South Korea had a start list of 41 competitors from 31 nations, with two qualifying groups (41 jumpers) before the final (12) took place on Sunday September 25, 1988. The maximum number of athletes per nation had been set at three since the 1930 Olympic Congress.

The event was won by 23 cm by Carl Lewis of the United States, the nation's second consecutive and 18th overall gold medal in the men's long jump. It was Lewis's second gold medal of the Games (after Ben Johnson's disqualification in the 100 metres elevated Lewis to gold in that event) as he tried to defend his 1984 quadruple; he would later come short in the 200 metres (taking silver) and did not even get to compete in the 4 × 100 metres relay (the heats team fumbled an exchange and did not qualify for the final).

The American team completed a medals sweep in the event for the first time since 1904 (they had also done it at the first Games in 1896). Mike Powell took silver. Larry Myricks finally won an Olympic medal; he was on track to be part of a medal-sweeping team in 1976 before breaking his foot in warmups for the final, he was the favorite in 1980 before the United States boycotted the Games, and he had come in fourth in 1984.

== Background ==
This was the 21st appearance of the event, which is one of 12 athletics events to have been held at every Summer Olympics. The returning finalists from the 1984 Games were gold medalist Carl Lewis of the United States, bronze medalist Giovanni Evangelisti of Italy, fourth-place finisher Larry Myricks of the United States, seventh-place finisher Junichi Usui of Japan, eighth-place finisher Kim Jong-il of South Korea, and tenth-place finisher Antonio Corgos of Spain. The 1984 silver medalist, Gary Honey of Australia, was entered but did not start. Lewis and Myricks were the favorites; their new teammate, Mike Powell, was also a challenger.

Algeria, Bangladesh, Qatar, Saint Vincent and the Grenadines, Sierra Leone, and Swaziland each made their first appearance in the event. The United States appeared for the 20th time, most of any nation, having missed only the boycotted 1980 Games.

== Competition format ==
The 1988 competition used the two-round format with divided final introduced in 1952. The qualifying round gave each competitor three jumps to achieve a distance of 8.00 metres; if fewer than 12 men did so, the top 12 (including all those tied) would advance. The final provided each jumper with three jumps; the top eight jumpers received an additional three jumps for a total of six, with the best to count (qualifying round jumps were not considered for the final).

== Records ==
The standing world and Olympic records prior to the event were as follows.

World record	Bob Beamon (USA)	8.90	Mexico City, Mexico	18 October 1968
Olympic record	Bob Beamon (USA)	8.90	Mexico City, Mexico	18 October 1968

No new world or Olympic records were set during the competition.

== Schedule ==
All times are Korea Standard Time adjusted for daylight savings (UTC+10)

Date	Time	Round
Sunday, 25 September 1988	11:25	Qualifying
Monday, 26 September 1988	13:07	Final

== Results ==
=== Qualifying ===
Rank	Group	Athlete	Nation	1	2	3	Distance	Notes
1	B	Mike Powell	United States	7.83	X	8.34	8.34	Q
2	A	Larry Myricks	United States	8.19	—	—	8.19	Q
3	B	Carl Lewis	United States	8.08	—	—	8.08	Q
4	A	Norbert Brige	France	X	8.05	—	8.05	Q
5	A	Emiel Mellaard	Netherlands	7.84	8.02	—	8.02	Q
6	A	Laszlo Szalma	Hungary	7.92	7.89	X	7.92	q
7	A	Antonio Corgos	Spain	7.91	7.88	—	7.91	q
8	B	Jarmo Karna	Finland	7.71	7.89	7.90	7.90	q
9	B	Leonid Voloshin	Soviet Union	X	X	7.89	7.89	q
10	B	Giovanni Evangelisti	Italy	X	7.81	7.60	7.81	q
11	B	Pang Yan	China	7.64	X	7.79	7.79	q
12	B	Mark Forsythe	Great Britain	7.77	7.77	7.45	7.77	q
13	A	Stewart Faulkner	Great Britain	7.72	7.74	7.74	7.74	
14	A	Bruny Surin	Canada	7.69	7.73	7.39	7.73	
15	B	Yusuf Ali	Nigeria	7.72	7.73	7.67	7.73	
16	B	Kim Jong-Il	South Korea	7.36	7.68	7.70	7.70	
17	A	James Browne	Antigua and Barbuda	7.06	7.67	7.33	7.67	
18	B	Chen Zunrong	China	X	7.61	7.66	7.66	
19	B	Frédéric Ebong-Salle	Cameroon	7.34	7.65	X	7.65	
20	A	David Culbert	Australia	X	X	7.64	7.64	
21	A	Andreas Steiner	Austria	7.40	7.61	7.48	7.61	
22	A	Glenroy Gilbert	Canada	7.46	7.61	7.27	7.61	
23	A	John King	Great Britain	7.57	X	X	7.57	
24	B	Stephen Hanna	Bahamas	7.54	X	X	7.54	
25	A	Ian James	Canada	X	X	7.52	7.52	
26	B	Hiroyuki Shibata	Japan	X	7.48	X	7.48	
27	A	Nai Hui-Fang	Chinese Taipei	7.45	X	7.16	7.45	
28	B	Teddy Steinmayr	Austria	X	7.31	7.36	7.36	
29	B	Lotfi Khaïda	Algeria	7.10	X	X	7.10	
30	B	Muhammad Urfaq	Pakistan	X	X	7.09	7.09	
31	A	José Leitão	Portugal	X	6.99	6.81	6.99	
32	A	Ricardo Valiente	Peru	6.91	X	6.92	6.92	
33	B	Francis Keita	Sierra Leone	6.52	6.87	6.14	6.87	
—	A	David Lamai	Kenya	X	X	X	No mark	
—	A	Orde Ballantyne	Saint Vincent and the Grenadines	X	X	—	No mark	
—	A	Sizwe Sydney Mdluli	Swaziland	X	X	X	No mark	
—	A	Shahanuddin Choudhury	Bangladesh	X	X	X	No mark	
—	A	Abdullah Mohamed Al-Sheib	Qatar	X	—	—	No mark	
—	B	Junichi Usui	Japan	X	X	X	No mark	
—	B	Ray Quiñones	Puerto Rico	X	X	X	No mark	
—	B	Robert Emmiyan	Soviet Union	—	—	—	No mark	
—	A	Gary Honey	Australia	DNS				
—	B	Vladimir Ochkan	Soviet Union	DNS				

=== Final ===
Rank	Athlete	Nation	1	2	3	4	5	6	Distance
1st place, gold medalist(s)	Carl Lewis	United States	8.41	8.56	8.52	8.72	8.52	X	8.72
2nd place, silver medalist(s)	Mike Powell	United States	8.23	8.11	8.49	X	—	X	8.49
3rd place, bronze medalist(s)	Larry Myricks	United States	8.14	8.27	X	8.17	X	X	8.27
4	Giovanni Evangelisti	Italy	7.84	8.08	7.63	—	—	—	8.08
5	Antonio Corgos	Spain	8.03	X	X	7.86	X	7.99	8.03
6	László Szalma	Hungary	X	X	8.00	X	X	X	8.00
7	Norbert Brige	France	7.87	X	X	7.97	X	X	7.97
8	Leonid Volochine	Soviet Union	7.87	7.78	X	X	X	7.89	7.89
9	Pang Yan	China	X	7.72	7.86	Did not advance			7.86
10	Jarmo Kärnä	Finland	X	7.81	7.82	Did not advance			7.82
11	Emiel Mellaard	Netherlands	7.71	X	7.51	Did not advance			7.71
12	Mark Forsythe	Great Britain	X	X	7.54	Did not advance			7.54

== See also ==
- 1986 Men's European Championships Long Jump (Stuttgart)
- 1987 Men's World Championships Long Jump (Rome)
- 1990 Men's European Championships Long Jump (Split)
- 1991 Men's World Championships Long Jump (Tokyo)
