= Charles Amos =

Guyanese boxer

Charles Amos (born March 14, 1945) is a retired Guyanese boxer. He represented Guyana at the 1968 Summer Olympics in the middleweight division, losing his opening bout to Wiesław Rudkowski of Poland.

He is the father of professional boxer Troy Amos-Ross, who competed for Canada in the light heavyweight (< 81 kg) division at the 1996 Summer Olympics in Atlanta, Georgia and 2000 Summer Olympics in Sydney, Australia, and uncle to retired professional boxer Egerton Marcus, who won the silver medal competing for Canada in the middleweight division (71–75 kg) at the 1988 Summer Olympics in Seoul, Korea.
