= Thomas Hearns vs. Michael Olajide =

Boxing match

The Barrage at Trump Taj
- Date: April 28, 1990
- Venue: Trump Taj Mahal, Atlantic City, New Jersey, U.S.
- Title on the line: WBO super middleweight title

Tale of the tape
Boxer	Thomas Hearns	Michael Olajide
Nickname	The Hitman	The Silk
Hometown	Detroit, Michigan, U.S.	Vancouver, British Columbia, Canada
Purse	$1,600,000	$250,000
Pre-fight record	46–3–1 (38 KO)	27–2 (19 KO)
Age	31 years, 6 months	26 years, 4 months
Height	6 ft 1 in (185 cm)	6 ft 1 in (185 cm)
Weight	168 lb (76 kg)	166 lb (75 kg)
Style	Orthodox	Orthodox
Recognition	The Ring; No. 1 Ranked Super Middleweight; WBO; Super Middleweight Champion; 4–division world champion	WBC; No. 7 Ranked Middleweight

Result
- Hearns wins via unanimous decision (120–107, 119–107, 119–110)

Thomas Hearns vs. Michael Olajide, billed as The Barrage at Trump Taj, was a professional boxing match contested on April 28, 1990 for the WBO super middleweight title.

== Background ==
Following a controversial draw in his previous fight, it was announced that Thomas Hearns would make his first defense of the WBO super middleweight title against Michael Olajide. The bout was set to be the first to be held at the then-newly opened Trump Taj Mahal owned by future United States President Donald Trump. Trump was in the midst of his high-profile separation (and eventual divorce) from wife Ivana which overshadowed the pre-fight press conferences.

Olajide had been a top prospect in the middleweight division, becoming the #2 middleweight contender in 1987 and securing a fight for the vacant IBF middleweight title against the #1 ranked Hearns, but Hearns turned down the fight in order to move up to the light heavyweight division. With Hearns leaving the middleweight division, Olajide ascended to the #1 middleweight, but lopsided losses to Frank Tate and Iran Barkley had hurt his status as one of the premier up-and-comers. In an effort to resurrect his career, Olajide had parted ways with this father, Michael Olajide, Sr. in favor of legendary trainer Angelo Dundee prior to landing the Hearns fight.

== The fight ==
Hearns cruised to a relatively easy unanimous decision victory. Hearns served as the aggressor for the entire duration of the fight as Olajide took a more defensive approach and offered little offensively in the fight. Hearns would score the fight's lone knockdown after dropping Olajide with a right cross. Olajide would answer the referee's 10-count at 7 and withstood a flurry of punches while against the ropes as Hearns looked to finish the fight. The fight would ultimately go to the judge's scorecards with Hearns winning by large margins on all three; 120–107, 119–107 and 119–110.

== Aftermath ==
An eye injury from boxing ended Olajide's career in 1991. The injury left him legally blind in his right eye.

== Fight card ==
Confirmed bouts:

Weight Class	Weight		vs.		Method	Round	Notes
Super Middleweight	168 lbs.	Thomas Hearns (c)	def.	Michael Olajide	UD	12/12	^{Note 1}
Light Heavyweight	175 lbs.	Michael Moorer (c)	def.	Mario Melo	KO	1/12	^{Note 2}
Light Heavyweight	175 lbs.	Anthony Hembrick	def.	Lenzie Morgan	UD	8/8

^Note 1 For WBO Super Middlweight title
^Note 2 For WBO Light Heavyweight title

== Broadcasting ==
Country	Broadcaster
United States	Showtime

Preceded by vs. Sugar Ray Leonard II	Thomas Hearns's bouts 28 April 1990	Succeeded by vs. Kemper Morton
Preceded by vs. Dennis Milton	Michael Olajide's bouts 28 April 1990	Succeeded by vs. Ralph Moncrief
