= Darko Dukić =

Croatian boxer

Personal information
- Nationality: Croatian
- Born: 3 June 1962 (age 62); Split, Yugoslavia

Sport
- Sport: Boxing

Darko Dukić (born 3 June 1962) is a Croatian boxer. He competed in the men's middleweight event at the 1988 Summer Olympics.
