= Duran Williams =

Jamaican professional boxer

Duran Williams (also known as George Duran) (born 25 February 1967) is a Jamaican retired professional boxer.

== Life and career ==
Born in Saint Catherine Parish, Jamaica, Williams grew up in a family with 17 children. He worked as an electrician.

Williams made his debut in professional boxing on 3 August 1989, in his native Jamaica. He subsequently fought the vast majority of his fights in the United States. Williams, based in Fort Lauderdale, Florida, had a record of 16 wins and 1 draw and was ranked first in the IBF world ranking, when he took on German Henry Maske for the IBF Light Heavyweight world title in Dortmund, Germany on 17 February 1996. His trainer was Norman Wilson. Williams was paid US$200,000 for the fight. Williams and title holder Maske fought similar, rather cautious styles. A crowd of 12,500 at Westfalenhalle in Dortmund, witnessed a close bout, which saw Williams lose by unanimous decision.

On 9 August 1996, Williams lost the final fight of his professional career, when he was stopped in round nine by James Toney in a World Boxing Union (WBU) Light Heavyweight title fight. The bout took place in Bay St. Louis, Mississippi. Later in 1996, he was supposed to fight World Boxing Organization (WBO) Light Heavyweight world title holder Dariusz Michalczewski in Hanover, Germany, but did not receive the permission to leave the United States.

Williams retired with an overall record of 16 wins (11 by knockout), 2 losses and 1 draw.
