= Hiroyuki Shibata =

Japanese long jumper and coach

Personal information
- Nationality: Japanese
- Born: 26 April 1963 (age 62)

Sport
- Sport: Athletics
- Event: Long jump

Hiroyuki Shibata (Japanese: 柴田 博之, Hepburn: Shibata Hiroyuki; born 26 April 1963) is a Japanese athlete. He competed in the men's long jump at the 1988 Summer Olympics. He is currently the track coach of Rakunan High School in Kyoto, where he coached Olympian Yoshihide Kiryū, the first Japanese to break the 10-second barrier.
