= Anthony Hembrick =

American boxer

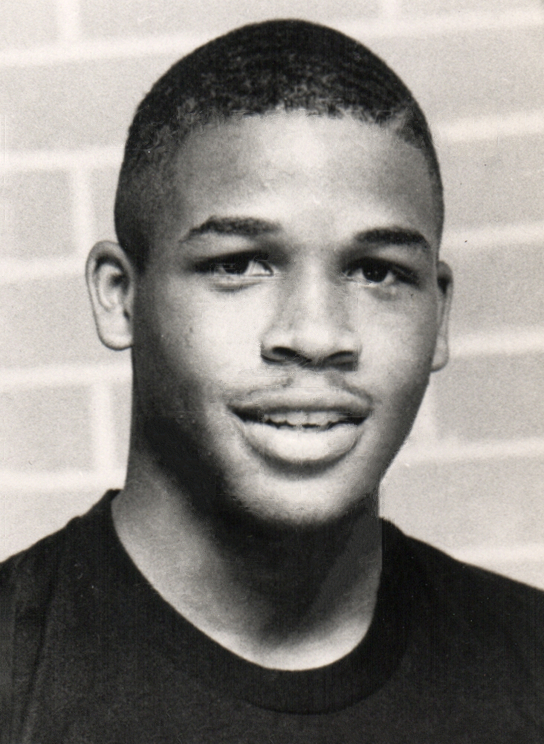
- Hembrick in 1988

Personal information
- Born: February 22, 1966 (age 60) Detroit, Michigan, U.S.
- Height: 1.85 m (6 ft 1 in)
- Weight: Light-heavyweight

Boxing career

Boxing record
- Total fights: 41
- Wins: 31
- Win by KO: 22
- Losses: 8
- No contests: 2

Anthony Hembrick (born February 22, 1966) is an American former professional boxer who competed from 1989 to 1996. He twice challenged for a world light-heavyweight title in 1992 and 1993. As an amateur, he was a member of the 1988 US Olympics team.

== Amateur career ==
Hembrick is best known for never having had the opportunity to fight in the 1988 Olympics. Hembrick and his coach, Ken Adams, misinterpreted the fight schedule. Afterwards, they blamed the schedule for being too confusing. By the time Hembrick arrived at Chamshil Students' Gymnasium twelve minutes late, he had been disqualified and the match was being awarded to South Korean Ha Jong-ho.

=== Amateur Highlights ===
Hembrick was the 1986 and 1987 United States Amateur middleweight champion, while boxing for United States Army. He later was the U.S. Olympic representative at middleweight in 1988.

== Professional career ==
Hembrick turned professional in 1989 and unsuccessfully challenged WBO light heavyweight title holder Leeonzer Barber, losing a split decision. Hembrick lost in his other title opportunity as well, in 1993 to IBF light heavyweight title holder Henry Maske. He retired in 1996.

== Professional boxing record ==
31 Wins (22 knockouts, 9 decisions), 8 Losses (5 knockouts, 3 decisions), 2 Draws
Result	Record	Opponent	Type	Round	Date	Location	Notes
Loss	31–8–2	Richard Frazier	KO	8	07/06/1996	New York City, New York, U.S.	
Draw	31–7–2	Terry McGroom	PTS	10	23/04/1996	Auburn Hills, Michigan, U.S.	
Win	31–7–1	Mike Sedillo	MD	10	31/03/1996	Auburn Hills, Michigan, U.S.	
Win	30–7–1	Richard Perry	TKO	5	25/02/1996	Nashville, Tennessee, U.S.	
Loss	29–7–1	James Toney	RTD	5	30/04/1995	Paradise, Nevada, U.S.	USBA Light Heavyweight Title. Hembrick did not come out for the sixth round.
Win	29–6–1	Rudy Nix	TKO	6	25/01/1995	Atlantic City, New Jersey, U.S.	USBA Light Heavyweight Title.
Loss	28–6–1	Richard Frazier	UD	8	17/12/1994	Atlantic City, New Jersey, U.S.	
Win	28–5–1	Tim St Clair	TKO	3	20/09/1994	Pensacola, Florida, U.S.	
Loss	27–5–1	James Toney	TKO	7	16/01/1994	Bushkill, Pennsylvania, U.S.	Referee stopped the bout at 0:47 of the seventh round.
Loss	27–4–1	Henry Maske	UD	12	18/09/1993	Düsseldorf, Germany	IBF Light Heavyweight Title.
Win	27–3–1	John Foreman	TKO	6	20/03/1993	Düsseldorf, Germany	
Win	26–3–1	Pat Alley	TKO	5	26/12/1992	Revere, Massachusetts, U.S.	
Win	25–3–1	Ron Daniels	TKO	3	21/10/1992	Winchester, Nevada, U.S.	
Win	24–3–1	Earl Butler	TKO	4	03/09/1992	San Bernardino, California, U.S.	
Loss	23–3–1	Orlin Norris	TKO	8	25/03/1992	San Diego, California, U.S.	NABF Cruiserweight Title.
Loss	23–2–1	Leeonzer Barber	SD	12	07/01/1992	Auburn Hills, Michigan, U.S.	WBO Light Heavyweight Title.
Win	23–1–1	Joe McKnight	KO	1	17/12/1991	Honolulu, Hawaii, U.S.	
Win	22–1–1	Robert Johnson	KO	1	15/11/1991	Roanoke, Virginia, U.S.	
Win	21–1–1	James Williamson	TKO	2	17/09/1991	Auburn Hills, Michigan, U.S.	
Win	20–1–1	Larry Prather	KO	3	25/06/1991	Auburn Hills, Michigan, U.S.	
Draw	19–1–1	Mike Sedillo	PTS	10	20/05/1991	Houston, Texas, U.S.	
Win	19–1	James Mullins	TKO	1	28/04/1991	Raleigh, North Carolina, U.S.	
Win	18–1	Rusty Rosenberger	TKO	2	06/04/1991	Honolulu, Hawaii, U.S.	
Win	17–1	Keith McMurray	KO	4	11/02/1991	Inglewood, California, U.S.	
Win	16–1	Israel Cole	UD	8	28/01/1991	Reseda, California, U.S.	
Win	15–1	Leslie Stewart	UD	10	09/11/1990	Hollywood, Florida, U.S.	
Loss	14–1	Booker T Word	TKO	1	12/06/1990	Fort Bragg, North Carolina, U.S.	USBA Light Heavyweight Title. Referee stopped the bout at 2:44 of the first round.
Win	14–0	Lenzie Morgan	UD	8	28/04/1990	Atlantic City, New Jersey, U.S.	
Win	13–0	Martin Amarillas	TKO	8	12/03/1990	Jakarta, Indonesia	Referee stopped the bout at 2:30 of the eighth round.
Win	12–0	Keith McMurray	UD	8	22/02/1990	Phoenix, Arizona, U.S.	
Win	11–0	Donald Stephens	UD	6	02/02/1990	Paradise, Nevada, U.S.	
Win	10–0	Rocky Bentley	TKO	1	29/11/1989	Auburn Hills, Michigan, U.S.	
Win	9–0	Matthew Brooks	UD	6	21/11/1989	Santa Monica, California, U.S.	
Win	8–0	Manuel Murillo	TKO	2	19/10/1989	Atlantic City, New Jersey, U.S.	Referee stopped the bout at 2:34 of the second round.
Win	7–0	John Keys	TKO	3	28/09/1989	Lewiston, Maine, U.S.	
Win	6–0	Darryl Spain	TKO	4	07/09/1989	Auburn Hills, Michigan, U.S.	Michigan Light Heavyweight Title.
Win	5–0	Charlie Dean Moore	PTS	6	27/07/1989	New York City, New York, U.S.	
Win	4–0	David Overton	TKO	2	02/07/1989	Fayetteville, North Carolina, U.S.	Referee stopped the bout at 1:28 of the second round.
Win	3–0	Wendell Everett	TKO	2	23/06/1989	Atlantic City, New Jersey, U.S.	
Win	2–0	Danny Wofford	PTS	6	24/05/1989	Concord, North Carolina, U.S.	
Win	1–0	Ron West	TKO	2	22/04/1989	Auburn Hills, Michigan, U.S.	
