= Cliff Couser =

American boxer

Personal information
- Nicknames: The Black Bull, Twin Tyson
- Nationality: American
- Born: Clifford Eugene Couser; May 18, 1971 (age 55) St. Louis, Missouri
- Height: 5 ft 11 in (1.80 m)
- Weight: Heavyweight

Boxing career
- Reach: 73 in (185 cm)
- Stance: Orthodox

Boxing record
- Total fights: 52
- Wins: 26
- Win by KO: 14
- Losses: 22
- Draws: 2
- No contests: 2

Clifford Couser (born May 18, 1971) is a heavyweight boxer. Nicknamed "The Black Bull" and often "Twin Tyson" for his resemblance to Mike Tyson, Couser fought several contenders from his era. Couser has also claimed numerous times to be the half brother of Mike Tyson.

== Professional career ==
Couser turned pro in 1993 and has beaten notable fighters, such as James "Quick" Tillis, Jorge Luis Gonzalez and Monte Barrett.

His career peak was 25–10, until he lost to former light Heavyweight and Heavyweight champion Michael Moorer and went 1-11 after that. He has won the Utah State Heavyweight title and also the North American Heavyweight titles.

== Outside the Ring ==
Couser played Mike Tyson in the HBO film Don King: Only in America. He has a son by the name of Sky Christopher King who resides in Rosedale, Mississippi and a daughter by the name of Shae Moore who lives in Las Vegas.

== Professional boxing record ==
26 Wins (14 knockouts), 22 Losses, 2 Draws, 2 No Contests
Result	Record	Opponent	Type	Round	Date	Location	Notes
Loss	26-22-2; 2 NC	(United States) Billy Zumbrun	KO	4 (8)	21/01/2012	(United States) Eccles Conference Center, Ogden, Utah	
Loss	26-21-2; 2 NC	(United States) Joe Hanks	KO	1 (6)	10/02/2010	(United States) Marriott Hotel, Irvine, California	
Loss	26-20-2; 2 NC	(Australia) John Hopoate	TKO	4 (8)	20/03/2009	(United States) Manly Leagues Club, Brookvale, New South Wales, Australia	
Loss	26-19-2; 2 NC	(United States) Travis Kauffman	KO	1 (6)	07/02/2009	(United States) Honda Center, Anaheim, California	
Loss	26-18-2; 2 NC	(Australia) Solomon Haumono	UD	8	27/08/2008	(United States) E.G. Whitlam Recreation Center, Liverpool, New South Wales, Australia	
Loss	26-17-2; 2 NC	(United States) Cedric Boswell	TKO	2 (8)	12/07/2008	(United States) Bernie Robbins Stadium, Atlantic City, New Jersey	
Loss	26-16-2; 2 NC	(United States) Johnnie White	UD	8	28/06/2008	(United States) Waveland Event Center, Waveland, Mississippi	
Loss	26-15-2; 2 NC	(United States) Chris Arreola	TKO	1 (10)	09/02/2008	(United States) Pechanga Resort & Casino, Temecula, California	Couser was originally hurt by a left hand at 0:52 into the 1st round and after a barrage attack by Arreola, Couser halfway turned his back and took a knee. At this referee, Jerry Cantu waved an end to the bout.
Loss	26-14-2; 2 NC	(United States) Monte Barrett	TKO	2 (6)	06/12/2007	(United States) Paradise Theater, Bronx, New York	Barrett was working from the outside with counter shots. Couser was knocked down once in the 2nd round by a barrage of punches.
Loss	26-13-2; 2 NC	(United States) Tony Thompson	TKO	2 (10)	27/09/2007	(United States) Tachi Palace Hotel & Casino, Lemoore, California	
Win	26-12-2; 2 NC	(United States) Monte Barrett	TKO	2 (10)	07/07/2007	(United States) Harbour Yard Arena, Bridgeport, Connecticut	
Loss	25-12-2; 2 NC	(United States) Rob Calloway	TKO	2 (10)	10/05/2007	(United States) Crowne Plaza Hotel, Tulsa, Tulsa, Oklahoma	
Loss	25-11-2; 2 NC	(United States) Michael Moorer	KO	1 (10)	09/12/2006	(United States) Seminole Hard Rock Hotel and Casino, Hollywood, Florida	
Win	25-10-2; 2 NC	(United States) Troy Beets	TKO	4 (10)	07/04/2006	(United States) Kessler Air Force Base, Biloxi, Mississippi	Won NAMA North American Heavyweight title.
NC	24-10-2; 2 NC	(United States) Andrew Greeley	ND	5 (10)	08/07/2005	(United States) Hancock County Civic Center, Bay St. Louis, Mississippi	
Loss	24-10-2; 1 NC	(Ukraine) Volodymyr Vyrchys	TKO	5 (12)	26/06/2004	Zviozdniy Hall, Feodosia, Ukraine	Won IBF Inter-Continental heavyweight title. Couser down in rounds 2, 3 and 5.
Loss	24-9-2; 1 NC	(United States) Malcolm Tann	DQ	1 (8)	11/07/2003	(United States) Agua Caliente Casino, Rancho Mirage, California	Couser was disqualified in round 1 for slamming Tann & attempting to hit him while he was on the mat.
Win	24-8-2; 1 NC	(United States) Karl Evans	TKO	3 (8)	09/05/2003	(United States) Lakeside Casino, Osceola, Iowa	
Loss	23-8-2; 1 NC	(United States) Lance Whitaker	KO	5 (10)	13/10/2002	(United States) Silver Star Casino, Choctaw, Mississippi	
Win	23-7-2; 1 NC	(Ukraine) Vladyslav Andreyev	TKO	5 (8)	16/02/2002	Sport Palace "Druzhba", Donetsk, Ukraine	
Win	22-7-2; 1 NC	(United States) James Johnson	KO	2 (8)	06/12/2001	(United States) Adam's Mark Hotel, St. Louis, Missouri	
Loss	21-7-2; 1 NC	(United States) Willie Chapman	PTS	10	21/09/2001	Sport Palace Yunusabad, Tashkent, Uzbekistan	
Win	21-6-2; 1 NC	(United States) Anthony Moore	UD	10	29/03/2001	(United States) Hollywood Park Casino, Inglewood, California	
Loss	20-6-2; 1 NC	(United States) Clifford Etienne	TKO	3 (10)	09/09/2000	(United States) Mountaineer Casino, Racetrack and Resort, Chester, West Virginia	For vacant NABF Heavyweight title. Etienne was badly hurt in the 2nd round by an overhand right. Couser was badly hurt by many punches, and the referee stop the contest in the 3rd round (2:13).
Win	20-5-2; 1 NC	(Cuba) Jorge Luis Gonzalez	TKO	3 (10)	05/08/2000	(United States) Silver Star Casino, Philadelphia, Mississippi	Gonzalez down twice in the 1st round and down again in the 3rd round. Gonzalez received a warning in Round 2 for leaning on Couser. The fight was stopped by referee Raymond White as Gonzalez was taking big shots and heading to the canvas again.
Win	19-5-2; 1 NC	(United States) Dale Crowe	UD	10	11/06/2000	(United States) Lucky Star Casino, Concho, Oklahoma	
Win	18-5-2; 1 NC	(United States) Bradley Rone	UD	8	12/05/2000	(United States) Adam's Mark Hotel, Tulsa, Oklahoma	
Win	17-5-2; 1 NC	(United States) Rodney McSwain	UD	8	10/02/2000	(United States) Harrah's Casino, Vicksburg, Mississippi	
Loss	16-5-2; 1 NC	(United States) Wesley Martin	PTS	8	22/04/1999	(United States) Adam's Mark Hotel, Tulsa, Oklahoma	
Loss	16-4-2; 1 NC	(Mexico) Mike Sedillo	SD	8	07/03/1999	(United States) Celebrity Theatre, Phoenix, Arizona	
Win	16-3-2; 1 NC	(United States) Everett Martin	UD	10	01/10/1998	(United States) Harrah's Casino, St. Louis, Missouri	
Win	15-3-2; 1 NC	(United States) Lorenzo Boyd	KO	4 (10)	11/06/1998	(United States) Harrah's Casino, Kansas City, Missouri	
Win	14-3-2; 1 NC	(United States) Derrick Roddy	KO	2 (6)	23/04/1998	(United States) Adam's Mark Hotel, Tulsa, Oklahoma	
Win	13-3-2; 1 NC	(United States) Gary Tompkins	PTS	6	21/11/1997	(United States) Richmond, Virginia	
Win	12-3-2; 1 NC	(United States) Bomani Parker	PTS	10	28/10/1997	(United States) Orléans Hotel & Casino, Las Vegas	
Win	11-3-2; 1 NC	(United States) Frankie Hines	KO	2 (8)	16/10/1997	(United States) Norfolk, Virginia	
Win	10-3-2; 1 NC	(United States) Kevin Smalls	KO	1 (6)	16/08/1997	(United States) Coliseum, Greensboro, North Carolina	
NC	9-3-2; 1 NC	(United States) Keith McMurray	NC	9 (10)	10/05/1997	(United States) St. George, Utah	For USA Utah State Heavyweight title.
Win	9-3-2	(United States) James Tillis	TKO	6 (10)	30/08/1996	(United States) Quay Centennial Building, Vancouver, Washington	
Win	8-3-2	(United States) Marco Dickson	PTS	6	22/04/1996	(United States) Radisson Hotel, Sacramento, California	
Win	7-3-2	(United States) Marco Dickson	PTS	6	18/03/1996	(United States) Radisson Hotel, Sacramento, California	
Loss	6-3-2	(United States) Carlos Monroe	PTS	6	12/02/1996	(United States) Great Western Forum, Inglewood, California	
Win	6-2-2	(United States) Craig Brinson	KO	1 (6)	11/12/1995	(United States) Great Western Forum, Inglewood, California	
Draw	5-2-2	(United States) John Bray	PTS	6	15/09/1995	(United States) Las Vegas	
Win	5-2-1	(United States) Krishna Wainwright	PTS	4	09/05/1995	(United States) Aladdin Theater, Las Vegas	
Loss	4-2-1	(United States) Jeff Williams	PTS	6	24/05/1994	(United States) Robinsonville, Mississippi	
Win	4-1-1	(United States) Ken Kirkwood	PTS	6	01/04/1994	(United States) St. Louis	
Loss	3-1-1	(United States) Brian LaSpada	PTS	6	02/02/1994	(United States) Las Vegas	
Win	3-0-1	Chris Walker	KO	3 (6)	24/01/1994	(United States) St. Louis	
Win	2-0-1	(United States) Lopez McGee	KO	1 (4)	20/11/1993	(United States) Columbia, Missouri	
Win	1-0-1	(United States) Ray Kipping	PTS	4	27/09/1993	(United States) St. Louis	
Draw	0-0-1	(United States) Ron Williams	PTS	4	31/07/1993	(United States) Davenport, Iowa	
