= Georgios Ioannidis (boxer) =

Greek boxer

Personal information
- Nationality: Greek
- Born: 17 August 1966 (age 59)

Sport
- Sport: Boxing

Georgios Ioannidis (born 17 August 1966) is a Greek boxer. He competed in the men's middleweight event at the 1988 Summer Olympics. He was the "inspiration, center, and core" of the Greek documentary "Boxer".
