= Reggie Johnson (boxer) =

American boxer

Personal information
- Nickname: Sweet
- Born: Reggie Dwayne Johnson; August 28, 1966 (age 60) Houston, Texas, U.S.
- Height: 5 ft 10 in (178 cm)
- Weight: Middleweight; Light heavyweight

Boxing career
- Reach: 72 in (183 cm)
- Stance: Southpaw

Boxing record
- Total fights: 52
- Wins: 44
- Win by KO: 25
- Losses: 7
- Draws: 1

Reggie Dwayne Johnson (born August 28, 1966) is an American former professional boxer who competed from 1984 to 2008. He is a two-weight world champion, having held the World Boxing Association (WBA) middleweight title from 1992 to 1993, and the International Boxing Federation (IBF) light heavyweight title from 1998 to 1999.

== Professional career ==
Johnson made his professional debut in 1984.

=== Middleweight ===
He won the WBA Inter-Continental middleweight title in 1989, and the USBA middleweight title in 1990, before losing a disputed split decision in 1991 against James Toney for the IBF and lineal middleweight titles, a fight in which he notably knocked Toney down in the second round.

In 1992 he won his first world championship by winning the vacant WBA middleweight title in a close decision over Steve Collins. After three successful defenses, including a decision over the undefeated Lamar Parks, Johnson lost the belt to fellow southpaw John David Jackson. He twice failed in attempts to regain the WBA title, both by hotly disputed decisions to Jorge Castro in Argentina.

=== Light heavyweight ===
He later moved up to light heavyweight, winning the IBF title in 1998 against the undefeated William Guthrie with a rare one-punch knockout in the fifth round, a fight in which Guthrie left the ring on a stretcher. Johnson defended the title twice before losing by a wide decision to Roy Jones Jr. in a unification bout for the WBA and WBC titles in 1999.

In 2001, Johnson returned to boxing and won the NABF and USBA light heavyweight titles, which he then lost in 2002 following a close decision to Antonio Tarver in an IBF world title eliminator. At age 35, Johnson then retired.

He returned in 2005 for one fight, then in 2008 Johnson scored a split decision win over former light heavyweight world champion Julio César González.

== Professional boxing record ==
52 fights	44 wins	7 losses
By knockout	25	0
By decision	19	7
Draws	1	

No.	Result	Record	Opponent	Type	Round, time	Date	Location	Notes
52	Win	44–7–1	Julio César González	SD	12	Feb 23, 2008	Sudduth Coliseum, Lake Charles, Louisiana, U.S.	Won vacant IBA light heavyweight title
51	Win	43–7–1	Fred Moore	KO	9 (10), 2:59	Aug 27, 2005	Paragon Casino Resort, Marksville, Louisiana, U.S.	
50	Loss	42–7–1	Antonio Tarver	SD	12	Jan 25, 2002	Ramada Plaza O'Hare, Rosemont, Illinois, U.S.	Lost NABF and USBA light heavyweight titles
49	Win	42–6–1	Will Taylor	UD	12	May 25, 2001	Mystic Lake Casino Hotel, Prior Lake, Minnesota, U.S.	Retained NABF light heavyweight title; Won vacant USBA light heavyweight titles
48	Win	41–6–1	Chris Johnson	UD	12	Jan 5, 2001	The Grand Theatre, Biloxi, Mississippi, U.S.	Won NABF light heavyweight title
47	Win	40–6–1	Earl Butler	UD	10	Dec 18, 1999	Hofheinz Pavilion, Houston, Texas, U.S.	
46	Loss	39–6–1	Roy Jones Jr.	UD	12	Jun 5, 1999	Grand Casino, Biloxi, Mississippi, U.S.	Lost IBF light heavyweight title; For WBA and WBC light heavyweight titles
45	Win	39–5–1	Will Taylor	UD	12	Feb 27, 1999	Miccosukee Resort & Gaming, Miami, Florida, U.S.	Retained IBF light heavyweight title
44	Win	38–5–1	Ole Klemetsen	UD	12	May 29, 1998	Pesaro, Italy	Retained IBF light heavyweight title
43	Win	37–5–1	William Guthrie	KO	5 (12), 1:58	Feb 6, 1998	Mohegan Sun Arena, Montville, Connecticut, U.S.	Won IBF light heavyweight title
42	Win	36–5–1	Robert Doyle	KO	1	Jul 12, 1997	Sam's Town Hotel and Gambling Hall, Tunica Resorts, Mississippi, U.S.	
41	Loss	35–5–1	Jorge Castro	SD	12	Oct 13, 1995	Estadio Socios Fundadores, Comodoro Rivadavia, Argentina	For WBA middleweight title
40	Loss	35–4–1	Jorge Castro	SD	12	Aug 12, 1994	Club Defensores de Villa Luján, San Miguel, Argentina	For vacant WBA middleweight title
39	Win	35–3–1	Ramon Felix	KO	1	Feb 19, 1994	Coliseum, Charlotte, North Carolina, U.S.	
38	Loss	34–3–1	John David Jackson	UD	12	Oct 1, 1993	Estadio Obras Sanitarias, Buenos Aires, Argentina	Lost WBA middleweight title
37	Win	34–2–1	Wayne Harris	UD	12	May 4, 1993	McNichols Sports Arena, Denver, Colorado, U.S.	Retained WBA middleweight title
36	Win	33–2–1	Ki-Yun Song	TKO	8 (12), 0:40	Jan 19, 1993	Boise Centre, Boise, Idaho, U.S.	Retained WBA middleweight title
35	Win	32–2–1	Lamar Parks	UD	12	Oct 27, 1992	The Summit, Houston, Texas, U.S.	Retained WBA middleweight title
34	Win	31–2–1	Steve Collins	MD	12	Apr 22, 1992	Brendan Byrne Arena, East Rutherford, New Jersey, U.S.	Won vacant WBA middleweight title
33	Win	30–2–1	Melvin Wynn	KO	2 (10), 0:51	Dec 17, 1991	Interstate Fairgrounds, Pensacola, Florida, U.S.	
32	Loss	29–2–1	James Toney	SD	12	Jun 29, 1991	Las Vegas Hilton, Winchester, Nevada, U.S.	For IBF middleweight title
31	Win	29–1–1	Al Long	RTD	8 (10), 3:00	Apr 8, 1991	Great Western Forum, Inglewood, California, U.S.	
30	Win	28–1–1	José Carlos da Silva	TKO	3 (10), 0:58	Dec 19, 1990	Great Western Forum, Inglewood, California, U.S.	
29	Win	27–1–1	Ralph Ward	TKO	7 (10), 3:00	Oct 8, 1990	Great Western Forum, Inglewood, California, U.S.	
28	Win	26–1–1	Eddie Hall	TKO	10 (12), 3:00	Aug 9, 1990	Hacienda, Paradise, Nevada, U.S.	Retained USBA middleweight title
27	Win	25–1–1	Greg Dickson	TKO	2 (12), 1:18	Jul 5, 1990	Cow Pasture, Gardnerville, Nevada, U.S.	Retained USBA middleweight title
26	Win	24–1–1	Sanderline Williams	UD	12	Apr 16, 1990	Great Western Forum, Inglewood, California, U.S.	Retained USBA middleweight title
25	Win	23–1–1	Ismael Negron	TKO	11 (12), 1:03	Feb 4, 1990	Las Vegas Hilton, Winchester, Nevada, U.S.	Won vacant USBA middleweight title
24	Win	22–1–1	Victor Fernandez	KO	2 (12)	Oct 21, 1989	León, Spain	Retained WBA Inter-Continental middleweight title
23	Win	21–1–1	Israel Cole	PTS	12	Sep 12, 1989	Great Western Forum, Inglewood, California, U.S.	Won vacant WBA Inter-Continental middleweight title
22	Win	20–1–1	Nathan Dryer	KO	3 (10)	Jun 28, 1989	Los Angeles, California, U.S.	
21	Win	19–1–1	Rigoberto Lopez	KO	3	May 15, 1989	Great Western Forum, Inglewood, California, U.S.	
20	Win	18–1–1	Charles Oosthuizen	RTD	7 (10)	Nov 14, 1988	Indoor Arena, Springs, South Africa	
19	Win	17–1–1	William Clayton	KO	3 (10), 0:55	May 4, 1988	Bingo Wonderland, Houston, Texas, U.S.	
18	Win	16–1–1	Jake Torrance	UD	8	Apr 6, 1988	Bingo Wonderland, Houston, Texas, U.S.	
17	Win	15–1–1	Gonzalo Montes	TKO	4 (10), 2:26	Mar 2, 1988	Bingo Wonderland, Houston, Texas, U.S.	
16	Win	14–1–1	Victor Walker	TKO	5 (8)	Feb 14, 1988	Memorial Coliseum, Corpus Christi, Texas, U.S.	
15	Win	13–1–1	Ron Martin	TKO	7 (8), 0:59	Jan 6, 1988	Houston, Texas, U.S.	
14	Win	12–1–1	Sidney Outlaw	UD	6	Dec 5, 1987	Convention Hall, Atlantic City, New Jersey, U.S.	
13	Win	11–1–1	Charles Hollis	PTS	8	Oct 8, 1987	Houston, Texas, U.S.	
12	Win	10–1–1	Oscar Pena	PTS	6	Jun 23, 1987	Marriott Brookhollow, Houston, Texas, U.S.	
11	Win	9–1–1	Martin Garza	KO	1	Jan 17, 1987	Harlingen, Texas, U.S.	
10	Win	8–1–1	Eric Williams	TKO	3 (6), 1:17	Jun 12, 1985	Hyatt Regency, Houston, Texas, U.S.	
9	Draw	7–1–1	Eric Williams	PTS	6	Apr 9, 1985	Hyatt Regency, Houston, Texas, U.S.	
8	Win	7–1	Stephen Lee	UD	6	Mar 5, 1985	Convention Center, Dallas, Texas, U.S.	
7	Loss	6–1	Adam George	UD	8	Jan 29, 1985	Houston, Texas, U.S.	
6	Win	6–0	Phil Jones	UD	6	Dec 27, 1984	Marriott Market Center, Dallas, Texas, U.S.	
5	Win	5–0	Tarlton Washington	KO	1 (6)	Dec 18, 1984	Houston, Texas, U.S.	
4	Win	4–0	Jonathan Ivory	UD	6	Nov 23, 1984	Sportatorium, Dallas, Texas, U.S.	
3	Win	3–0	Richard Fillitelli	KO	1 (6), 2:24	Nov 17, 1984	Houston, Texas, U.S.	
2	Win	2–0	Carl Orville	KO	2	Oct 9, 1984	Houston, Texas, U.S.	
1	Win	1–0	Mark Henderson	PTS	4	Aug 14, 1984	Pasadena, Texas, U.S.	Professional debut

== Titles in boxing ==
=== Major world titles ===
- WBA middleweight champion (160 lbs)
- IBF light heavyweight champion (175 lbs)

=== Minor world titles ===
- IBA light heavyweight champion (175 lbs)

=== Regional/International titles ===
- USBA middleweight champion (160 lbs)
- WBA Inter-Continental middleweight champion (160 lbs)
- NABF light heavyweight champion (175 lbs)
- USBA light heavyweight champion (175 lbs)

Sporting positions
Regional boxing titles
New title	WBA Inter-Continental middleweight champion September 12, 1989 – February 1990; Vacated	Vacant Title next held by Howard Eastman
Vacant Title last held by Steve Collins	USBA middleweight champion February 4, 1990 – June 29, 1991; Lost bid for IBF world title	Vacant Title next held by Bernard Hopkins
Preceded by Chris Johnson	NABF light heavyweight champion January 5, 2001 – January 25, 2002	Succeeded by Antonio Tarver
Vacant Title last held by David Telesco	USBA light heavyweight champion May 25, 2001 – January 25, 2002	Succeeded by Antonio Tarver
Minor world boxing titles
Vacant Title last held by Glen Johnson	IBA light heavyweight champion February 23, 2008 – May 2009; Vacated	Vacant Title next held by Beibut Shumenov
Major world boxing titles
Vacant Title last held by Mike McCallum	WBA middleweight champion April 22, 1992 – October 1, 1993	Succeeded by John David Jackson
Preceded by William Guthrie	IBF light heavyweight champion February 6, 1998 – June 5, 1999	Succeeded by Roy Jones Jr.
