= Omar Dabaj =

Jordanian boxer

Personal information
- Nationality: Jordanian
- Born: 13 January 1969 (age 57)

Sport
- Sport: Boxing

Omar Dabaj (born 13 January 1969) is a Jordanian boxer. He competed in the men's middleweight event at the 1988 Summer Olympics.
