= Emmanuel Legaspi =

Filipino boxer

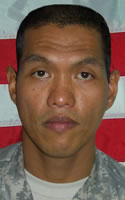

Personal information
- Born: September 2, 1967 Pasay, Rizal, Philippines
- Died: May 7, 2006 (aged 38) Tal Afar, Iraq
- Height: 6 ft 0 in (183 cm)
- Weight: 165 lb (75 kg)

Boxing career
- Weight class: Middleweight

Emmanuel Legaspi (September 2, 1967 – May 7, 2006) was a Filipino-American boxer. He competed for the Philippines in the men's middleweight event at the 1988 Summer Olympics. He was killed in action in 2006 while serving in the U.S. Army in Iraq.

== Personal life ==
Legaspi served as a staff sergeant in the 1st Armored Division of the United States Army during Operation Iraqi Freedom. He died of wounds on May 7, 2006, after his unit came under enemy small-arms fire in Tal Afar.
