= Kaleka Mutoke =

Congolese long-distance runner

Personal information
- Nationality: Congolese
- Born: 7 July 1966 (age 59)

Sport
- Sport: Long-distance running
- Event: Marathon

Kaleka Mutoke (born 7 July 1965 or 1966) is a Congolese long-distance runner. He competed in four events across three different Olympic Games.

At the 1988 Summer Olympics, Mutoke competed in the 5000 metres and marathon. At the 1992 Summer Olympics in Barcelona, Mutoke competed in the 1500 metres and 4 × 400 m relay. He also competed in the marathon at the 1996 Summer Olympics in Atlanta.

Mutoke is from Kambove, Haut-Katanga Province, Democratic Republic of the Congo. He represented Kambove in competitions.

Following the 1996 Olympics, Mutoke was in Charlotte, North Carolina where he competed in the 1997 Observer Marathon.
