= Olivette Bice =

Vanuatuan sprinter

Personal information
- Born: May 12, 1968 (age 57) Espiritu Santo
- Height: 1.63 m (5 ft 4 in)
- Weight: 52 kg (115 lb)

Sport
- Country: Vanuatu
- Sport: Athletics
- Event(s): 100 metres, 200 metres

Olivette Bice (née Daruhi, born 12 May 1968 in Espiritu Santo) is a Vanuatuan sprinter.

Bice was the first female competitor from her country at the Summer Olympics when she attended the 1988 Summer Olympics held in Seoul. In the 100 metres, she ran 13 seconds and finished 7th out of 8 in her heat, so she didn't qualify for the next round. She also ran in the 200 metres and finished 5th out of 7 in her heat, and again she failed to qualify for the next round.

She was the flag bearer for Vanuatu in the 1988 Summer Olympics opening ceremony.
