= Muhammad Urfaq =

Pakistani long jumper (born 1961)

Personal information
- Nationality: Pakistani
- Born: 30 November 1961 (age 64)
- Height: 180 cm (5 ft 11 in)
- Weight: 75 kg (165 lb)

Sport
- Sport: Athletics
- Event: Long jump

Muhammad Urfaq (born 30 November 1961) is a Pakistani athlete. He represented Pakistan at the 1988 Summer Olympics and competed in the men's long jump that year.
