= Esa Hukkanen =

Finnish boxer

Personal information
- Born: February 25, 1963 (age 63)
Medal record
Men's Boxing
Representing Finland
European Amateur Championships
| Bronze medal – third place | 1987 Turin | Middleweight |

Esa Juhani Hukkanen (born February 25, 1963, in Lahti) is a former amateur boxer from Finland. He is best known for winning the bronze medal at the 1987 European Championships in Turin, Italy in the Men's Middleweight (– 75 kg) division. He represented his native country at the 1988 Summer Olympics in Seoul, South Korea.
