= Pang Yan =

Chinese long jumper

Personal information
- Nationality: Chinese
- Born: 15 January 1963 (age 63)

Sport
- Sport: Athletics
- Event: Long jump
Medal record
Men's athletics
Representing China
Asian Championships
Silver medal – second place	1985 Jakarta	Long jump

Pang Yan (born 15 January 1963) is a Chinese athlete. He competed in the men's long jump at the 1988 Summer Olympics.
