= Michele Mastrodonato =

Italian boxer (born 1965)

Personal information
- Nationality: Italian
- Born: 16 May 1965 (age 59); San Severo, Italy

Sport
- Sport: Boxing

Michele Mastrodonato (born 16 May 1965) is an Italian former boxer. He competed in the men's middleweight event at the 1988 Summer Olympics.
