= Ruslan Taramov =

Russian boxer (1965–2026)

Personal information
- Full name: Ruslan Ikhvanovich Taramov
- Nationality: Russian
- Born: 13 July 1965 Grozny, Checheno-Ingush ASSR, Russian SFSR, Soviet Union
- Died: 3 August 2026 (aged 61)

Sport
- Sport: Boxing

Ruslan Ikhvanovich Taramov (Russian: Руслан Ихванович Тарамов; 13 July 1965 – 3 August 2026) was a Russian boxer. He competed in the men's middleweight event at the 1988 Summer Olympics.

Taramov died on 3 August 2026, at the age of 61.
