= Abdelhalim =

Abdelhalim is both a given name and a surname. Notable people with the name include:

== First name ==
- Abdelhalim Bensmaia (1866–1933), Islamic scholar
- Abdelhalim Hemche (1908–1979), Algerian figurative painter
- Abdelhalim Kaouane (born 1981), Algerian professional basketball player
- Abdelhalim Ouradi (born 1981), Algerian boxer

== Middle name ==
- Ahmed Abdelhalim Ghanem (born 1959), Egyptian hurdler
- Emad Abdelhalim Ali, Egyptian boxer
- Ibrahim Abdelhalim Masoud (born 1997), Qatari footballer

== Surname ==
- Amr Abdelhalim (born 1991), Egyptian basketball player
