= Javed Rasool =

Pakistani sailor (born 1964)

Personal information
- Nationality: Pakistani
- Born: 26 March 1964 (age 61)

Sport
- Sport: Sailing

Javed Rasool (born 26 March 1964) is a Pakistani sailor. He competed at the 1988 Summer Olympics and the 1992 Summer Olympics.
