= Ha Jong-ho =

South Korean boxer

Personal information
- Nationality: South Korean
- Born: 16 July 1963 (age 63)

Sport
- Sport: Boxing

Achievements and titles
- Olympic finals: 1988 Summer Olympics

Ha Jong-ho (born 16 July 1963) is a South Korean boxer. He competed in the men's middleweight event at the 1988 Summer Olympics.
