= Bomani Parker =

American boxer

Personal information
- Nickname: Warrior
- Born: Parker White; September 30, 1967 (age 58) Cincinnati, Ohio, U.S.
- Height: 6 ft 3 in (191 cm)
- Weight: Heavyweight

Boxing career
- Stance: Southpaw

Boxing record
- Total fights: 23
- Wins: 14
- Win by KO: 8
- Losses: 8
- Draws: 1
- No contests: 0

Bomani Parker (born September 30, 1967), formerly named Parker White, is an American boxer born in Cincinnati, Ohio. His parents moved to California shortly after his birth.

== Amateur career ==
Parker's boxing career started in West Oakland, in the Boys and Girls Club. At age 19 he weighed-in as a middleweight at 165 pounds and fought as a south-paw (left-handed). In 1986, Parker fought as a National Golden Gloves Champion and also became a member of the American Olympic boxing team. He fought in the Goodwill Games and became an American Golden Gloves contender. Parker defeated Russian opponents six times—a record for an American boxer. He holds the record against Cuba as well, with a total of four wins. In 1988, Parker competed in a championship bout in the 1988 Olympic Trials against Alfred Cole.

== Professional career ==
Parker made his professional boxing debut on October 13, 1988. Moving up in weight class, he went on to win the WBC Light Heavyweight Continental Americas title on October 2, 1991. Parker continued to move up in weight class, fighting at cruiserweight and eventually heavyweight class in 1995. He held a 14-6-1 record before his career was cut short by a 13-year prison sentence for possession of controlled substances. He attempted a comeback in 2012 losing to Rodney Hernandez by a unanimous decision.

== Professional boxing record ==
23 fights	14 wins	8 losses
By knockout	8	6
By decision	6	2
Draws	1	

No.	Result	Record	Opponent	Type	Round, time	Date	Location	Notes
23	Loss	14–8–1	(United States) Yohan Banks	UD	1 (4), 1:59	20 Jul, 2013	(United States) Red Lion Hotel, Sacramento, California	
22	Loss	14–7–1	(United States) Rodney Hernandez	UD	4	14 Sep, 2012	(United States) Woodlake Hotel, Sacramento, California	
21	Loss	14–6–1	(United States) Cliff Couser	UD	10	28 Nov, 1997	(United States) Orleans Hotel & Casino, Las Vegas, Nevada	
20	Loss	14–5–1	(United States) Ed Mahone	TKO	3 (10), 1:39	24 Feb, 1997	(United States) Great Western Forum, Inglewood, California	
19	Loss	14–4–1	(United States) Lionel Butler	KO	1 (10), 3:00	21 Nov, 1996	(United States) Country Club, Reseda, California	
18	Loss	14–3–1	(New Zealand) Jimmy Thunder	KO	1 (10), 2:36	17 June 1995	(United States) MGM Grand, Las Vegas, Nevada	
17	Win	14–2–1	(Sweden) Mikael Lindblad	UD	8	30 Apr, 1995	(United States) Rio Casino, Las Vegas, Nevada	
16	Draw	13–2–1	(United States) John Elkins	TD	? (4)	5 Nov 1994	(United States) Circus Maximus Showroom, Stateline, Nevada	
15	Loss	13–2	(United States) Ernesto Magdaleno	KO	5 (12)	24 Feb, 1992	(United States) Great Western Forum, Inglewood, California	
14	Win	13–1	(Mexico) Martín Amarillas	MD	12	2 Oct, 1991	(United States) Concord, California	For vacant WBC Continental Americas light heavyweight title
13	Loss	12–1	(Russia) Viktor Potekhin	TKO	2 (?)	7 Mar, 1991	(United States) Fairmont Hotel, Dallas, Texas	
12	Win	12–0	(United States) LaVelle Stanley	KO	1 (?)	1 Feb, 1991	(United States) Richmond, California	
11	Win	11–0	(United States) Grover Robinson	KO	10 (10)	19 Dec, 1990	(United States) Texas Longhorn Club, Vinton, Louisiana	
10	Win	10–0	(United States) Tony Orville	KO	6 (?), 1:55	25 Oct, 1990	(United States) Texas Longhorn Club, Vinton, Louisiana	
9	Win	9–0	(United States) Terry Verners	PTS	6	6 Aug, 1990	(United States) Great Western Forum, Inglewood, California	
8	Win	8–0	(United States) Nate Houser	KO	3 (?)	18 Jun, 1990	(United States) Great Western Forum, Inglewood, California	
7	Win	7–0	(United States) Raymond Gonzales	KO	2 (?)	15 Dec, 1989	(United States) Vallejo, California	
6	Win	6–0	(United States) James Fernandez	PTS	6	5 Oct, 1989	(United States) Houston, Texas	
5	Win	5–0	(United States) Roger Montue	PTS	5	29 Mar, 1989	(United States) Oakland, California	
4	Win	4–0	(United States) Chris Doolittle	TKO	1 (?)	19 Feb, 1989	(United States) Monessen High Gym, Monessen, Pennsylvania	
3	Win	3–0	(United States) Calvert Jackson	KO	2 (?)	29 Nov, 1988	(United States) Richmond, California	
2	Win	2–0	(United States) Adrian Riggs	UD	4	10 Nov, 1988	(United States) Caesars Tahoe, Cascade Showroom, Stateline, Nevada	
1	Win	1–0	(United States) Dusty Dyer	KO	1 (?)	13 Oct, 1988	(United States) Caesars Tahoe, Cascade Showroom, Stateline, Nevada	Professional debut
