= Aharon Jacobashvili =

Israeli boxer

Personal information
- Nationality: Israel
- Born: אהרון יעקבשווילי; September 18, 1964 (age 61) Georgia
- Height: 5 ft 11 in (180 cm)
- Weight: 165 lb (75 kg)

Boxing career

Aharon Jacobashvili (also Aaron and Jakobashvili; Hebrew: אהרון יעקבשווילי; born September 18, 1964) is an Israeli former Olympic boxer.

He was born in Georgia, and is Jewish.

== Boxing career ==
He competed for Israel at the 1988 Summer Olympics in Seoul, South Korea, at the age of 23. He boxed in the Men's Middleweight competition, losing on points to West German Sven Ottke (who later was the IBF super-middleweight world champion from 1998 to 2004, and the WBA super-middleweight world champion from 2003 to 2004), and came in tied for 32nd. When he boxed in the Olympics he was 5 feet 11 inches (180 cm) tall, and weighed 165 pounds (75 kg).
