= Juan Montiel =

Uruguayan boxer (born 1965)

Juan Carlos Montiel
Personal information
- Full name: Juan Carlos Montiel Zauco
- Nickname: "Tito"
- Nationality: Uruguay
- Born: November 12, 1965 (age 60) Montevideo
- Height: 1.76 m (5 ft 9 1/2 in)
- Weight: 73 kg (161 lb)

Sport
- Sport: Boxing
- Weight class: Middleweight
Medal record
Pan American Games
Bronze medal – third place	1987 Indianapolis	Middleweight

Juan Carlos Montiel (born November 12, 1965, in Montevideo) is a retired male boxer from Uruguay. He competed for his native country at the 1988 Summer Olympics in Seoul, South Korea, and won a bronze medal at the 1987 Pan American Games during his career as an amateur. Nicknamed "Tito" he made his professional debut on October 15, 1993, defeating Luiz Augusto Ferreira.
