= Egerton Marcus =

Canadian boxer (born 1965)

Personal information
- Born: February 2, 1965 (age 61) Goed Fortuin, Essequibo Islands-West Demerara, British Guiana
Medal record
Men's Boxing
Representing Canada
Olympic Games
Silver medal – second place	1988 Seoul	Middleweight
World Cup
Silver medal – second place	1985 Seoul	Light heavyweight

Egerton Marcus (born February 2, 1965) is a Canadian former professional boxer who competed from 1989 to 2007. As an amateur, he won the silver medal in the middleweight division at the 1988 Summer Olympics in Seoul.

== Early life ==
Egerton is the third child of five. His mother Joyce Fraser was a boxer in Guiana. He has two older brothers (Neville and Christopher D. Amos) and two younger sisters (Sharon and Felicia). Born in Goed Fortuin, Essequibo Islands-West Demerara, British Guiana, he came to Canada in 1973 and was raised in Toronto, Ontario. He is the nephew of Charles Amos who fought for Guyana in the 1968 Summer Olympics and first cousin of Troy Amos-Ross who competed in the light heavyweight division at the 1996 Summer Olympics in Atlanta, Georgia and 2000 Summer Olympics in Sydney, Australia.

== Amateur career ==
Egerton won the middleweight silver medal representing Canada at the 1988 Olympics in Seoul, South Korea. His results were:

- 1st round bye
- Defeated Emmanuel Legaspi (Philippines) KO 1
- Defeated Darko Dukić (Yugoslavia) KO 2
- Defeated Sven Ottke (West Germany) 5–0
- Defeated Hussain Shah Syed (Pakistan) 4–1
- Lost to Henry Maske (East Germany) 0–5

== Professional career ==
Marcus turned pro in 1989 and began his career with fourteen consecutive wins, including a bloody TKO win over former Olympian Andrew Maynard. In February 1995, he challenged Henry Maske for the IBF Light Heavyweight Title and lost by unanimous decision. Marcus's career then veered off track, culminating with a TKO loss to Donovan Ruddock at heavyweight. Marcus initially retired in 2001 with a record of 17–4–1.In 2007, Marcus came out of retirement to beat Carl Gathright.

== Professional boxing record ==
17 Wins (12 knockouts, 5 decisions), 4 Losses (3 knockouts, 1 decision), 1 Draw
Result	Record	Opponent	Type	Round	Date	Location	Notes
Win	6-10-1	(United States) Carl Gathright	UD	8	21/07/2007	Richmond, British Columbia, Canada	
Loss	37-5-1	(Canada) Donovan Ruddock	TKO	10	12/10/2001	(New York (state)) Niagara Falls, New York, U.S.	Canada Heavyweight Title. Referee stopped the bout at 2:48 of the tenth round.
Win	8-8	(Canada) Troy Roberts	TKO	1	22/02/2001	Edmonton, Alberta, Canada	Referee stopped the bout at 1:59 of the first round.
Win	13-12-2	(United States) Tim Ray	TKO	1	22/10/1999	Detroit, Michigan, U.S.	Referee stopped the bout at 1:04 of the first round.
Loss	20-5-1	(United States) Lyle McDowell	TKO	7	13/02/1998	Edmonton, Alberta, Canada	IBO Intercontinental Heavyweight Title.
Loss	27-4-2	(United States) Brian LaSpada	TKO	8	11/03/1997	Phoenix, Arizona, U.S.	WBO NABO Cruiserweight Title.
Draw	20-5-1	(United States) John McClain	PTS	12	18/07/1995	Flint, Michigan, U.S.	WBC Continental Americas Cruiserweight Title.
Loss	25-0	(Germany) Henry Maske	UD	12	11/02/1995	Frankfurt, Germany	IBF Light Heavyweight Title.
Win	14-4-1	(United States) Guy Stanford	UD	10	23/07/1994	Bismarck, North Dakota, U.S.	
Win	14-4	(United States) Earl Butler	UD	12	19/04/1994	Las Vegas, Nevada, U.S.	NABF Light Heavyweight Title.
Win	26-4-1	(United States) Willie Edwards	KO	1	12/10/1993	Virginia Beach, Virginia, U.S.	NABF Light Heavyweight Title.
Win	21-4	(United States) Andrew Maynard	RTD	8	22/05/1993	(United States) Washington, D.C., U.S.	NABF Light Heavyweight Title. Maynard's corner threw in the towel.
Win	9-5	(United States) Art Bayliss	TKO	11	01/12/1992	Virginia Beach, Virginia, U.S.	NABF Light Heavyweight Title. Referee stopped the bout at 2:21 of the 11th round.
Win	8-8	(United States) John Burney	KO	2	22/08/1992	Bayamón, Puerto Rico	
Win	4-4	(United States) Mike Garcia	KO	1	Jul 18, 1992	Paradise, Nevada, U.S.	Garcia knocked out at 2:28 of the first round.
Win	7-1-1	(United States) Pat Alley	PTS	6	23/11/1991	(Georgia (U.S. state)) Atlanta, Georgia, U.S.	
Win	10-3	(United States) Randy Leaks	TKO	5	05/10/1991	Reno, Nevada, U.S.	Referee stopped the bout at 1:13 of the fifth round.
Win	4-0	(United States) David Martin	PTS	6	30/08/1991	Corpus Christi, Texas, U.S.	
Win	--	(United States) James Powell	KO	1	27/07/1991	Norfolk, Virginia, U.S.	
Win	0-4	(United States) Jay Morgan	KO	1	15/07/1989	Stateline, Nevada, U.S.	Morgan knocked out at 0:58 of the first round.
Win	0-1	(United States) Anthony Jones	KO	1	30/04/1989	Norfolk, Virginia, U.S.	
Win	0-1	(United States) Leroy Moore	TKO	1	14/04/1989	Atlantic City, New Jersey, U.S.	

== Life after boxing ==
Egerton became a member of ACTRA (Alliance of Canadian Cinema, Television and Radio Artists).

Egerton ran a boxing gym in Toronto's Liberty Village (The Egerton Marcus Boxing Academy) until the summer of 2006 and he still trains amateur boxers.
