= Paul Kamela =

Cameroonian boxer (born 1962)

Personal information
- Nationality: Cameroonian
- Born: 4 April 1962 (age 63)

Sport
- Sport: Boxing

Paul Kamela (born 4 April 1962) is a Cameroonian boxer. He competed at the 1980 Summer Olympics, 1984 Summer Olympics and the 1988 Summer Olympics.
