= Zoltán Füzesy =

Hungarian boxer (born 1961)

Personal information
- Nationality: Hungarian
- Born: 1 January 1961 (age 65) Kaposvár, Hungary

Sport
- Sport: Boxing
Medal record
Men's boxing
Representing Hungary
Friendship Games
Bronze medal – third place	1984 Havana	Middleweight
World Championships
Bronze medal – third place	1989 Moscow	Middleweight
European Amateur Championships
Silver medal – second place	1985 Budapest	Middleweight

Zoltán Füzesy (born 1 January 1961) is a Hungarian boxer. He competed in the men's middleweight event at the 1988 Summer Olympics.
