= Serge Kabongo =

Congolese boxer (born 1966)

Personal information
- Full name: Serge Kabongo Musungay
- Nationality: Congolese
- Born: 28 March 1966 (age 59)

Sport
- Sport: Boxing

Serge Kabongo (born 28 March 1966) is a Congolese former professional boxer who competed from 1989 to 1996. As an amateur, he competed in the men's middleweight event at the 1988 Summer Olympics.
