= Martín Amarillas =

Mexican boxer (born 1965)

Personal information
- Born: 20 December 1965 (age 60) Nogales, Sonora, Mexico
- Height: 6 ft 1 in (1.85 m)
- Weight: Light heavyweight

Boxing career

Boxing record
- Total fights: 20
- Wins: 11
- Win by KO: 8
- Losses: 9

Martín Amarillas (born 20 December 1965) is a Mexican former professional boxer who competed from 1989 to 1995. As an amateur, he competed in the men's middleweight event at the 1988 Summer Olympics.
