= Sirimongkol Singmanasak vs. Joichiro Tatsuyoshi =

Final Judgment
- Date: Saturday, November 22, 1997
- Venue: Osaka-jō Hall, Osaka, Japan
- Title(s) on the line: WBC bantamweight title

Tale of the tape
Boxer	(Thailand) Sirimongkol Singmanasak	(Japan) Joichiro Tatsuyoshi
Nickname	"Teppabud na yok" (Handsome Divinity)	"Naniwa no Joe" (Joe of Naniwa)
Hometown	Thanyaburi, Pathum Thani, Thailand	Kurashiki, Okayama, Japan
Pre-fight record	16–0–0 (6 KO)	14–4–1 (11 KO)
Age	20 years, 5 months	27 years, 6 months
Height	168 cm (5 ft 6 in)	165 cm (5 ft 5 in)
Weight	118 lb (54 kg)	118 lb (54 kg)
Style	Orthodox	Orthodox
Recognition	WBC; Bantamweight Champion; Former WBU Bantamweight and Super Flyweight Champions	Former WBC Bantamweight Champion

Result
- Tatsuyoshi wins via 7th-round TKO

Sirimongkol Singmanasak vs. Joichiro Tatsuyoshi, billed as Final Judgment, was a professional boxing match contested on November 22, 1997, for the WBC bantamweight championship.

== Background ==
At the time, Sirimongkol was the WBC world bantamweight champion at just 20 years old. He was a rising star and a major hope in the Thai boxing scene, having never lost a fight. Prior to this, he had also held two titles in minor organization, the WBU super flyweight and bantamweight championships. After winning the WBC interim title and becoming the official world champion, he successfully defended his title three times within Thailand. This fight marked his fourth title defense and was also his first bout held outside the country.

As the local challenger, Joichiro Tatsuyoshi was a beloved figure in Japan. He had briefly held the same title at the same organization in the early 1990s but faced eye problems that led to a temporary ban from boxing in Japan. He made three attempts to reclaim a world title, losing to a compatriot world champion Yasuei Yakushiji in 1994 after 12 rounds. He then moved up to the super bantamweight division to challenge a seasoned Mexican world champion Daniel Zaragoza in 1996 and early 1997, but was decisively defeated both times, notably suffering a technical knockout in the 11th round during the first attempt, with his face and trunks covered in blood.

For this championship bout, he dropped back down to the bantamweight division for another attempt, making it a highly anticipated showdown, which earned the fight the moniker "Final Judgment".

== The fight ==
The fight took place at Osaka-jō Hall in Osaka, the hometown of Tatsuyoshi, and was promoted by Akihiko Honda. The 14,000-seat venue was sold out. Ringside seats were priced at 38,000 yen (about 12,000 baht), while the cheapest tickets cost 5,000 yen (about 1,500 baht). Even children were required to pay for admission, with tickets priced at 3,000 yen (about 1,000 baht). (Note: At the exchange rate at the time, 1 baht was equivalent to roughly 3.1667 yen.) The fight was called live by three commentators, two former Japanese world champions, Fighting Harada and Tsuyoshi Hamada, along with Kenji Suzuki. Before the battle, Tatsuyoshi began warming up at 6:00 pm (JST), while a group of Thai fans living in Tokyo rented a large bus to come all the way to Osaka to cheer for Sirimongkol.

When the fighters stepped into the ring, Sirimongkol (Note: During that period, he fought under the name Sirimongkol Nakornthong Park Ville, the latter part referring to a housing estate project owned by real estate entrepreneur Naris Singwancha, who was his main sponsor.) had undergone severe weight loss, which was visibly evident in his pale face and sunken eyes, a consequence of still being in his growth years. Nevertheless, he held his ground against the Japanese challenger with pride during the first three rounds, particularly showcasing his signature jab, and seemed to control the pace of the fight.

However, with Tatsuyoshi's greater experience and resilient fighting style, combined with the support of the Japanese crowd, he began targeting Sirimongkol's body, a vulnerability that proved costly in the subsequent rounds. Late in the fifth round, after absorbing several body shots, Sirimongkol went down for the first time, taking an eight-count from American referee Richard Steele. In the sixth round, Sirimongkol, biting down and pressing forward, appeared to be gaining the upper hand.

In the seventh round, Tatsuyoshi astonishingly regained his energy and unleashed a flurry of body shots, sending Sirimongkol to the canvas. Richard Steele counted to eight, but Sirimongkol bravely rose to continue. Tatsuyoshi wasted no time and launched a relentless assault, leaving the Thai champion defenseless. Steele was forced to stop the fight in this round, at 1:54.

== Undercard ==
About 15 minutes before the main event, in one of the undercard fights, José Bonilla, the WBA flyweight world champion from Venezuela, defeated Keiji Yamaguchi by a sixth-round TKO. Bonilla had won the world title the previous year in Thailand by outpointing Saen Sor Ploenchit over 12 rounds. Yamaguchi, meanwhile, had formerly held the WBA junior flyweight world title but lost it to Pichit Chor Siriwat, a Thai challenger, also at the end of the previous year.

== Aftermath ==
When the fight ended, Tatsuyoshi reclaimed the world title for the second time, while Sirimongkol broke down in tears, unashamed of the first defeat of his professional career. Showing true sportsmanship, Tatsuyoshi consoled his fallen opponent, raising Sirimongkol's hand around the ring before thanking the fans in his distinct Osaka-style Kansai dialect.

Years later, Sirimongkol revealed that before the fight, he had told his manager, Sahasombhop Srisomvongse, that he could no longer make the 118-pound bantamweight limit. Those in the Thai boxing community, including many fans, were already aware of this, but Sahasombhop urged him to fight one last time in the division. He agreed. Sanhachai "Chang PR" Polcheewin, a journalist covering the bout, later wrote that during the breaks between rounds, Sirimongkol would flinch noticeably whenever his cornerman's hands touched his body.

After the loss, Sirimongkol continued boxing while also making occasional appearances in the showbiz, thanks to his good looks. He took on small roles in music videos, appeared as a television drama extra, and modeled for fashion magazines. Eventually, he returned to championship glory in 2002, winning the WBC super featherweight title in Japan, the very country where he had lost his crown.

For Tatsuyoshi, he successfully defended his title twice in 1998. The second defense came against American undefeated rising star Paul Ayala, where an accidental head clash in round six left Tatsuyoshi with a cut that prevented him from continuing, resulting in a technical decision victory. However, later that year, he lost the belt to former WBA bantamweight champion and accomplished Muay Thai fighter Veeraphol Sahaprom, who was seen as reclaiming a title once held by Thailand. Tatsuyoshi was knocked out cold in the sixth round. He attempted to regain the championship in a 1999 rematch, but was stopped again, this time in the seventh round, and he never became a world champion again.
