= Teerachai Sithmorseng =

Thai boxer

Tewa Kiram
- Born: March 21, 1992 (age 34); Amphoe Krasang, Buriram, Thailand
- Other names: Teerachai Sithmorseng; Teerachai Kratingdaenggym Teerachai Btugym
- Height: 5 ft 10 in (1.78 m)
- Weight: 154 lb (70 kg; 11 st 0 lb)
- Division: Welterweight; Super welterweight Light heavyweight
- Style: Professional boxing
- Team: TL Promotion
- Trainer: Anant Tualue
- Years active: 2008–Present

Professional boxing record
- Total: 50
- Wins: 49
- By knockout: 34
- Losses: 1

Other information
- Boxing record from BoxRec

Tewa Kiram (Thai: เทวา กิรัมย์; born 21 March 1992) also known as Teerachai Sithmorseng (ถิรชัย ศิษย์หมอเส็ง), Teerachai Kratingdaenggym (ถิรชัย กระทิงแดงยิม) Teerachai Btugym (ถิรชัย บีทียูยิม) or Teerachai Or.Aekkarin (ถิรชัย อ.เอกรินทร์), is a professional welterweight boxer. Kiram peaked ranked in World Boxing Association (WBA) as of January 2017.

== Boxing career ==
He made his professional boxing debut by defeating fellow Thai boxer Manfa Luksaikongdin, a former Pan Asian Boxing Association (PABA) light welterweight champion on points over six rounds in early 2008.

In 2011 and 2013, he traveled to the United States as a sparring partner for star Manny Pacquiao.

On February 17, 2017, he beat Vijender Kumar of India by ninth-round technical knockout at Morseng Thailand Building, Nham Daeng Market, Samut Prakan province.

=== Challenging for the WBA welterweight title ===
On January 20, 2018, he fought against and lost via 8th-round KO to Lucas Matthysse from Argentina for the vacant WBA Welterweight world championship in California, United States in a fight organized by Oscar De La Hoya's Golden Boy Promotions. During that time, he trained with former WBC champion Sirimongkol Singwangcha and Olympic medalist Suriya Prasathinphimai.

=== Super welterweight and Light heavyweight ===
Following his unsuccessful bid for the world title, Teerachai moved up to super welterweight and returned to fighting regularly in Thailand. On September 7, 2019, he defeated Junjesie Igbos by second-round knockout to win the WBA Asia super welterweight championship. He retained the title against Salehe Mkalekwa by unanimous decision on November 1, 2019.

On December 19, 2020, he defeated Chaloemporn Singwancha by tenth-round KO to win the WBA Asia light heavyweight championship. He would make his next title defense against former world champion Sirimongkol Singwancha on April 24, 2021, retaining the WBA Asia light heavyweight title by sixth-round technical knockout after Sirimongkol failed to come out for the seventh round.

He eventually moved back to super welterweight and defeated Mohammed Zamani to reclaim the WBA Asia super welterweight championship on July 2, 2022.

== Professional boxing titles ==
- Pan Asian Boxing Association
  - PABA Welterweight Interim Championship (2010)
  - PABA Welterweight Championship (2012)
  - PABA Welterweight Super Championship (2013)
  - PABA Welterweight title (2017)
- WBA Asia
  - WBA Asia Welterweight Championship (2017)
  - WBA Asia Super Welterweight Championship (2019)
  - WBA Asia Light Heavyweight Championship (2020)
  - WBA Asia Super Welterweight Championship (2022)

== Professional boxing record ==
51 fights	50 wins	1 loss
By knockout	35	1
By decision	15	0

No.	Result	Record	Opponent	Type	Round, time	Date	Location	Notes
51	Win	50–1	(China) Baishanbo Nasiyiwula	TKO	9 (10), 2:40	Aug 26, 2023	(United Arab Emirates) Le Meridien Dubai Hotel & Conference Centre, Dubai, U.A.E.	Retained WBA Asia super welterweight title.
50	Win	49–1	(Afghanistan) Mohammed Zamani	UD	10	Mar 4, 2023	(Thailand) Spaceplus Bangkok RCA, Bangkok	Retained WBA Asia super welterweight title.
49	Win	48–1	(Iran) Mostafa Rostampourdoushar	TKO	3 (6)	Oct 1, 2022	(Thailand) Spaceplus Bangkok RCA, Bangkok	
48	Win	47–1	(Afghanistan) Mohammed Zamani	UD	10	Jul 2, 2022	(Thailand) Spaceplus Bangkok RCA, Bangkok	Won vacant WBA Asia super welterweight title.
47	Win	46–1	(Thailand) Gupee Toprated	TKO	4 (6)	Dec 18, 2021	(Thailand) Suan Lum Night Bazaar Ratchadaphisek, Bangkok	
46	Win	45–1	(Thailand) Sirimongkol Singmanasak	RTD	6 (10), 3:00	Apr 24, 2021	(Thailand) Suan Lum Night Bazaar Ratchadaphisek, Bangkok	Retained WBA Asia light heavyweight title.
45	Win	44–1	(Thailand) Chaloemporn Singwancha	UD	10	Dec 19, 2020	(Thailand) Suan Lum Night Bazaar Ratchadaphisek, Bangkok	Won vacant WBA Asia light heavyweight title.
44	Win	43–1	(Tanzania) Salehe Mkalekwa	UD	10	Nov 1, 2019	(Thailand) CentralPlaza Khon Kaen, Khon Kaen	Retained WBA Asia super welterweight title.
43	Win	42–1	(Philippines) Junjesie Igbos	KO	2 (12), 1:29	Sep 7, 2019	(Thailand) Suan Lum Night Bazaar Ratchadaphisek, Bangkok	Won vacant WBA Asia super welterweight title.
42	Win	41–1	(Tanzania) Ramadhani Shauri	TKO	12 (12), 0:55	May 9, 2019	(Thailand) Bangkok University, Thonburi Campus, Bangkok	
41	Win	40–1	(Tanzania) Meshack Mwankemwa	UD	12	Jan 18, 2019	(Thailand) Bangkok University, Thonburi Campus, Bangkok	
40	Win	39–1	(Tanzania) Manyi Issa	TKO	4 (12), 2:14	Oct 19, 2018	(Thailand) Bangkok University, Thonburi Campus, Bangkok	
39	Loss	38–1	(Argentina) Lucas Matthysse	KO	8 (12), 1:21	Jan 27, 2018	(United States) The Forum, Inglewood, California, U.S.	For vacant WBA (Regular) welterweight title
38	Win	38–0	(Tanzania) Ramadhani Shauri	UD	12	Jul 14, 2017	(Thailand) Tapong Fruit Market Centre, Rayong	Won vacant WBA Asia welterweight title.
37	Win	37–0	(India) Vijender Kumar	KO	9 (12),	Feb 17, 2017	(Thailand) Samut Prakan	Retained Pan Asian Boxing Association welterweight title
36	Win	36–0	(Indonesia) Wellem Reyk	TKO	5 (12),	Oct 13, 2016	(Thailand) Morseng Center, Nakhon Ratchasima	Retained Pan Asian Boxing Association welterweight title
35	Win	35–0	(Dominican Republic) Vladimir Baez	KO	4 (12), 2:25	Jul 8, 2016	(Thailand) Morseng Center, Samut Prakan	Retained Pan Asian Boxing Association welterweight title
34	Win	34–0	(Indonesia) Larry Siwu	TKO	9 (12), 1:45	Apr 28, 2016	(Thailand) Morseng Center, Udon Thani	Retained Pan Asian Boxing Association welterweight title
33	Win	33–0	(Kazakhstan) Alexandr Zhuravskiy	UD	12	Jan 21, 2016	(Thailand) Pantainorasing Shrine, Samut Sakhon	Retained Pan Asian Boxing Association welterweight title
32	Win	32–0	(Philippines) Arnel Tinampay	UD	12	Nov 13, 2015	(Thailand) Bangkok University, Thonburi Campus, Bangkok	Retained Pan Asian Boxing Association welterweight title
31	Win	31–0	(South Africa) Boitshepo Mandawe	KO	6 (12),	Aug 21, 2015	(Thailand) Nonthaburi Pittayakom School, Nonthaburi	Retained Pan Asian Boxing Association welterweight title
30	Win	30–0	(South Africa) Kaizer Mabuza	UD	12	Apr 9, 2015	(Thailand) 700 Years Anniversary Sports St., Chiang Mai	Retained Pan Asian Boxing Association welterweight title
29	Win	29–0	(South Africa) Ntuthuko Memela	KO	4 (12),	Feb 6, 2015	(Thailand) Rattanakosin Sompot Lad Krabang School, Bangkok	Retained Pan Asian Boxing Association welterweight title
28	Win	28–0	(Dominican Republic) Abrahan Peralta	RTD	8 (12),	Nov 25, 2014	(Thailand) Liptapanlop Hall, Nakhon Ratchasima	Retained Pan Asian Boxing Association welterweight title
27	Win	27–0	(Philippines) Nelson Gulpe	RTD	4 (12), 3:00	Sep 5, 2014	(Thailand) Pak Kret School, Pak Kret	Retained Pan Asian Boxing Association welterweight title
26	Win	26–0	(Kazakhstan) Kanat Kartenbayev	TKO	3 (12),	Jul 4, 2014	(Thailand) Provincial Stadium, Phichit	Retained Pan Asian Boxing Association welterweight title
25	Win	25–0	(Uzbekistan) Behzod Nabiev	TKO	7 (12),	Mar 21, 2014	Bueng Kan School, Bueng Kan, Thailand	Retained Pan Asian Boxing Association welterweight title
24	Win	24–0	(Mexico) Fernando Castaneda	KO	1 (12), 1:44	Jan 17, 2014	(Thailand) Wat Sing Matayon School, Bangkok	Retained Pan Asian Boxing Association welterweight title
23	Win	23–0	(Kazakhstan) Omar Marabayev	TKO	5 (12)	Nov 26, 2013	(Thailand) Lawoe Technology School, Lop Buri	Retained Pan Asian Boxing Association welterweight title
22	Win	22–0	(Philippines) Randy Suico	TKO	1 (12)	Sep 17, 2013	(Thailand) Bangkok University, Thonburi Campus, Bangkok	Retained Pan Asian Boxing Association welterweight title
21	Win	21–0	(Australia) Ashley Sean Byrne	TKO	2 (12)	Jul 26, 2013	(Thailand) Bangkok	Retained Pan Asian Boxing Association welterweight title
20	Win	20–0	(Uzbekistan) Behzod Nabiev	UD	12	May 17, 2013	(Thailand) Bangkok University, Thonburi Campus, Bangkok	Retained Pan Asian Boxing Association welterweight title
19	Win	19–0	(Philippines) Ronnel Esparas	KO	3 (12), 2:35	Apr 18, 2013	(Thailand) Ayutthaya Park, Ayutthaya	Retained Pan Asian Boxing Association welterweight title
18	Win	18–0	(Philippines) Dondon Sultan	RTD	5 (12), 3:00	Feb 12, 2013	(Thailand) Chanthaburi	Retained Pan Asian Boxing Association welterweight title
17	Win	17–0	(Japan) Takejiro Kato	TKO	5 (12)	Dec 21, 2012	(Thailand) Bangkok University, Thonburi Campus, Bangkok	Retained Pan Asian Boxing Association welterweight title
16	Win	16–0	(Philippines) Romeo Jakosalem	RTD	6 (12), 3:00	Oct 24, 2012	(Thailand) Central Stadium, Loei	Retained Pan Asian Boxing Association welterweight title
15	Win	15–0	(Kazakhstan) Meirbek Sabirov	TKO	5 (12)	Aug 8, 2012	(Thailand) Lawoe Technology School, Lop Buri	Retained Pan Asian Boxing Association welterweight title
14	Win	14–0	(Philippines) Dan Nazareno Jr	UD	12	May 30, 2012	(Thailand) Kemapitaram School, Nonthaburi	Retained Pan Asian Boxing Association welterweight title
13	Win	13–0	(Kyrgyzstan) Urmat Ryskeldiev	TKO	4 (12), 2:21	Feb 28, 2012	(Thailand) Na-ngua Village, Petchaboon	Won Pan Asian Boxing Association welterweight title
12	Win	12–0	(Philippines) Dennis Padua	TKO	2 (12), 1:40	Dec 30, 2011	(Thailand) Bangkok University, Thonburi Campus, Bangkok	
11	Win	11–0	(Philippines) Dan Nazareno Jr	UD	12	Sep 6, 2011	(Thailand) Bangkok	
10	Win	10–0	(Kyrgyzstan) Damir Konushbaev	TKO	6 (12)	May 10, 2011	(Thailand) Nam Pat	
9	Win	9–0	(Philippines) Joel De la Cruz	TKO	3 (12)	Feb 7, 2011	(Thailand) Mae Cheam, Chiang Mai	
8	Win	8–0	(Philippines) Amor Tino	RTD	5 (12), 3:00	Dec 28, 2010	(Thailand) Laplae	
7	Win	7–0	(Kazakhstan) Vladislav Savchenko	UD	12	Oct 13, 2010	(Thailand) Tiakuihuwat Market, Bang Bo	
6	Win	6–0	(Indonesia) Moses Seran	TKO	2 (12), 2:03	Aug 17, 2010	(Thailand) Bodindecha School, Bangkok	
5	Win	5–0	(Indonesia) Jonatan Simamora	PTS	6	Jun 15, 2010	(Thailand) Indochina Market, Phitsanulok	
4	Win	4–0	(Indonesia) Jamed Jalarante	TKO	4 (6)	May 20, 2010	(Thailand) Borabue School, Maha Sarakham	
3	Win	3–0	(Thailand) Sudsakorn Sukkasemresort	TKO	3 (6)	Apr 27, 2010	(Laos) Bungkayong Stadium, Vientiane	
2	Win	2–0	(Thailand) Chartchai Sithmorseng	KO	3 (6)	Mar 26, 2010	(Thailand) Uttaradit	
1	Win	1–0	(Thailand) Theerawat Yoohanngoh	PTS	6	Jan 17, 2008	(Thailand) Nonthaburi Female High-School, Nonthaburi	
