= Wayne McCullough =

Northern Irish boxer

Wayne McCullough, OLY
Personal information
- Nickname: Pocket Rocket
- Nationality: Irish; British; American (after 2005)
- Born: Wayne William McCullough; 7 July 1970 (age 56) Belfast, Northern Ireland
- Height: 5 ft 7 in (170 cm)
- Weight: Bantamweight; Super-bantamweight; Featherweight

Boxing career
- Reach: 66 in (168 cm)
- Stance: Orthodox

Boxing record
- Total fights: 34
- Wins: 27
- Win by KO: 18
- Losses: 7
Medal record
Men's amateur boxing
Olympic Games
Representing Ireland
Silver medal – second place	1992 Barcelona	Bantamweight
Commonwealth Games
Representing Northern Ireland
Gold medal – first place	1990 Auckland	Flyweight

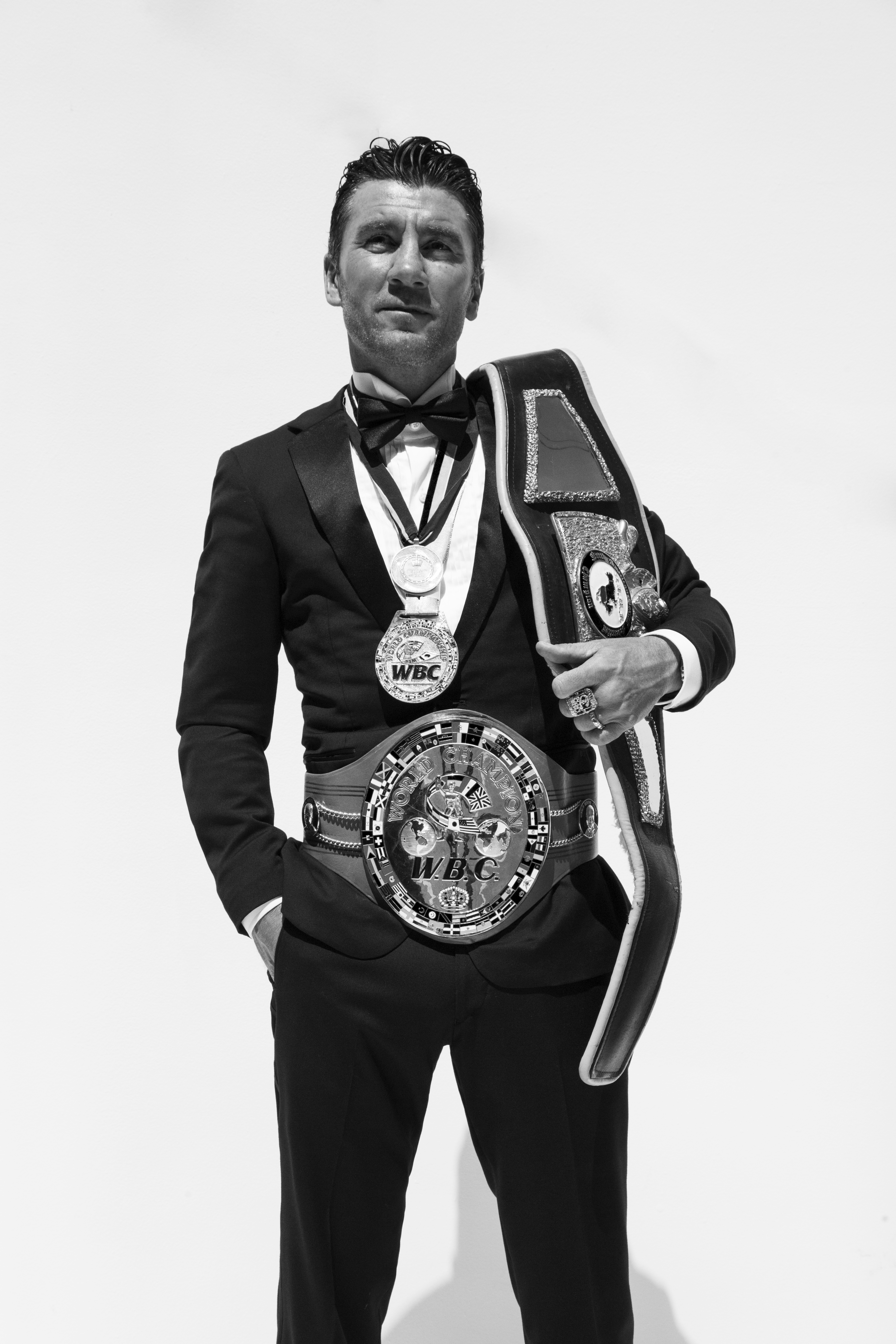
Wayne Pocket Rocket McCullough

Wayne Pocket Rocket McCullough (born Wayne William McCullough; 7 July 1970) is a former professional boxer from Northern Ireland who competed from 1993 to 2008. He held the WBC bantamweight title from 1995 to 1997, becoming the first boxer from Northern Ireland to win a WBC championship.

He challenged six times for world titles at super-bantamweight and featherweight. As an amateur, McCullough represented Ireland at the 1992 Summer Olympics, winning a bantamweight silver medal. He also won flyweight gold at the 1990 Commonwealth Games, representing Northern Ireland.

In addition to McCullough's dogged, relentless attacking style, he was renowned for his durable chin, having fought two of boxing's biggest punchers in Naseem Hamed and Érik Morales, and gone the full distance with both of them. During his bout with Morales in 1999, HBO commentator Larry Merchant joked, "If you look in the dictionary, under 'Tough Irishman', you'll find a picture of Wayne McCullough". McCullough was never once knocked down in his professional career. He also stopped the late Arturo Gatti as an amateur.

== Amateur career ==
McCullough had a very successful amateur career, amassing a record of 319 wins and 11 defeats, with over 100 wins coming by way of knockout. As an amateur living in the staunchly loyalist Shankill Road area of Belfast, he was selected by the island-wide Irish Amateur Boxing Association to participate in the 1988 Summer Olympics in Seoul, Korea, and asked to carry the Irish flag as the youngest member of the team (aged 18). He went on to win a silver medal for Ireland at the 1992 Summer Olympics in Barcelona.

Representing Northern Ireland at the 1990 Commonwealth Games, Auckland, he won a gold medal and carried the Northern Ireland flag in the closing ceremony. The medal ceremony for his Commonwealth title was marked by an unusual incident. A technical problem with the public address system made it impossible to play the recording of the song "Danny Boy", used instead of an anthem for medalists from Northern Ireland. The New Zealand official in charge of the sound, Bob Gibson, promptly took the microphone and sang the song unaccompanied. In 1990, McCullough also won a Bronze medal at the World Cup, becoming Ireland's only ever World Cup medal winner, in Mumbai, India.

=== 1988 Olympic Games ===
- Representing Ireland at Light Flyweight, in the Seoul Olympic Games. Results were:
  - First Round bye
  - Defeated Fred Mutuweta (Uganda) – Points
  - Lost to Scotty Olson (Canada) – Points

=== 1990 Commonwealth Games ===
- Representing Northern Ireland at Flyweight and winning Gold, in the Auckland Commonwealth Games. Results were:
  - Defeated Benjamin Mwangata (Tanzania) – Points
  - Defeated Maurice Maina (Kenya) – Points
  - Defeated Nokuthula Tshabangu (Zimbabwe) – Points

=== 1990 World Cup ===
- Representing Ireland at Bantamweight and winning Bronze, in the Mumbai World Cup. Results were:
  - Defeated Manoj Pingle (India) – Points
  - Defeated D.K. Park (South Korea) – Points
  - Lost to Serafim Todorov (Bulgaria) – Points
  - Defeated Fred Mutuweta (Uganda) – Points

=== 1991 World Championships ===
- Representing Ireland at Bantamweight, in the Sydney World Championships. Results were:
  - Defeated Felipe Costa (Portugal) – TKO (Round 2)
  - Defeated Joseph Zabakly (Australia) – Points
  - Lost to Enrique Carrion (Cuba) – Points

=== 1992 Olympic Games ===
- Representing Ireland at Bantamweight and winning Silver, in the Barcelona Olympic Games. Results were:
  - Defeated Fred Mutuweta (Uganda) – Points
  - Defeated Ahmed Abbood (Iraq) – Points
  - Defeated Mohammed Sabo (Nigeria) – Points
  - Defeated Gwang-Sik Li (North Korea) – Points
  - Lost to Joel Casamayor (Cuba) – Points

== Professional career ==
In 1993 McCullough moved to Las Vegas to train under Eddie Futch, who agreed to train him after seeing him at the Olympics. McCullough always fought in neutral colours and did not have national anthems played at his fights; his supporters in Northern Ireland include Protestants and Catholics. Within a year of turning pro, he had won the North American Boxing Federation title.

On 30 July 1995, less than 2½ years since his pro debut, he won the WBC championship by beating the champion Yasuei Yakushiji in Nagoya, Japan to become Ireland's first ever WBC world champion. He was the first fighter from Ireland or the UK to travel to Japan and win a belt. He defended his title twice before vacating the belt and moving up in weight to challenge WBC super bantamweight champion Daniel Zaragoza, but lost via a split decision in the WBC "Fight of the Year". After this fight, his wife Cheryl and Stuart Campbell began to manage his career when his original manager, Mat Tinley, became a boxing promoter.

McCullough unsuccessfully challenged champions Naseem Hamed in 1998, and Erik Morales in 1999. In each of those exciting "Fight of the Year" contenders, he broke his opponent's lengthy run of KO wins while taking them the distance. Hamed had knocked out 18 opponents straight before McCullough, and was 30–0 at the time with 28 knockouts to his credit. Morales had knocked out 9 of his previous 9 opponents and was 34–0 at the time, also with 28 knockouts. Morales stated that McCullough gave him one of the top three fights of his career and almost quit on his stool after the 9th round (according to Ring magazine).

In October 2000, McCullough was to return to his native Belfast for a homecoming fight. Two days before the fight was scheduled to take place, he was told that he had a cyst on his brain, he couldn't fight again and that one more blow to the head could kill him. McCullough flew back to Las Vegas and was advised by the Nevada Commission to visit the neurosurgery department at UCLA for a more thorough investigation. Within a few weeks the doctor at UCLA, Neil Martin, called to say he had consulted with some of the top neurosurgeons in the US and they had come to the conclusion that the cyst was not on his brain, but in a space between the brain and the skull – called the arachnoid mater – and that he saw no reason for him to give up his boxing career.

Nevertheless, the British Boxing Board of Control (BBBC) continued to deny him a licence. He was relicensed in Nevada and fought again in January 2002. After a very public battle, the BBBC could no longer deny him a licence and later that same year McCullough stepped back into a British ring under the Frank Warren Promotions banner. Thereafter he had mixed success, winning five fights but losing to Scott Harrison and Mexican world champion Óscar Larios on two occasions. The result of his first fight with Larios is widely disputed.

On 17 August 2005 McCullough was appointed the first WBC World Ambassador for Peace and Goodwill in Sports. In September 2005, McCullough became a United States citizen. In November 2005, McCullough released his autobiography, Pocket Rocket: Don't Quit, in the UK and Ireland. He went on a publicity tour to promote the book, which reached Number 2 on the best sellers list.

In 2007, McCullough joined the Ultimate Fighting Championship organisation as a PR associate, to promote Mixed Martial Arts (MMA). He currently trains fighters both in boxing and MMA and is setting up his own charity – IHOW.

=== McCullough vs. Martínez ===
In 2007 McCullough signed to fight Spain's Kiko Martínez who had just defeated Bernard Dunne at the Point Depot, Dublin for the European super bantamweight title. The fight between McCullough and Martínez was due to take place at Belfast's Kings Hall on 1 December 2007.

McCullough had not fought for over two years and the Kings Hall venue was sold out for the fight. It was agreed that the non-title fight would take place at 8 st 12 lb mark. However, on the day before the fight there was uproar during the weigh-in and the fight was cancelled by the BBBC amid chaotic scenes.

McCullough had already contracted to fight at 2 lb over the 8 st 10 lb championship weight and he weighed in at 8 st 9 lb. However, Martínez failed to make the agreed weight and was 1.75 lb over the agreed weight.

Martínez was given a couple of hours to shed the excess weight, but did not return to weigh in again and the scales were closed by a BBBC official. A furious McCullough stated "I couldn't believe it. He comes in over the weight and then after being asked to take it off he just sits there and does nothing. I just can't believe what has happened. I was ready to fight and ready to win and he comes in that much over the weight."

=== Retirement ===
On 20 June 2008, McCullough fought Juan Ruiz in the Cayman Islands, his first fight in three years. He lost in six rounds, retiring on his stool. Despite being ahead on two of three judges' scorecards after six rounds, he told his corner he could not go on due to an injury he had sustained in training. The Belfast boxer took the microphone and revealed this might be his swansong. He said: "I think this could be my last fight and I want to thank you all for coming. I am disappointed with the way things went but I just felt I could not go on."

== Personal life ==
McCullough married Cheryl Rennie, also from Belfast, in May 1993.

In 1998, Wayne's daughter Wynona was born in Las Vegas. She uses Wy Mac as her stage name and is carving a name for herself in the world of entertainment as a singer / songwriter and content creator.

In May 2004, McCullough changed his name by deed poll.

== Professional boxing record ==
34 fights	27 wins	7 losses
By knockout	18	2
By decision	9	5

No.	Result	Record	Opponent	Type	Round, time	Date	Location	Notes
34	Loss	27–7	Juan Ruiz	RTD	6 (10), 3:00	20 Jun 2008	Royal Watler Cruise Terminal, George Town, Cayman Islands	For vacant NABF featherweight title
33	Loss	27–6	Óscar Larios	RTD	10 (12), 3:00	16 Jul 2005	MGM Grand Garden Arena, Paradise, Nevada, US	For WBC super-bantamweight title
32	Loss	27–5	Óscar Larios	UD	12	10 Feb 2005	Palace Indian Gaming Center, Lemoore, California, US	For WBC super-bantamweight title
31	Win	27–4	Mike Juarez	TKO	2 (8), 2:59	23 Sep 2004	Pechanga Resort & Casino, Temecula, California, US	
30	Loss	26–4	Scott Harrison	UD	12	22 Mar 2003	Braehead Arena, Glasgow, Scotland	For WBO featherweight title
29	Win	26–3	Nikolay Emereev	TKO	4 (10), 2:55	2 Nov 2002	Maysfield Leisure Centre, Belfast, Northern Ireland	
28	Win	25–3	Johannes Maisa	TKO	4 (10), 2:12	14 Sep 2002	York Hall, London, England	
27	Win	24–3	Alvin Brown	KO	2 (10), 2:43	12 Jan 2002	Cox Pavilion, Paradise, Nevada, US	
26	Loss	23–3	Érik Morales	UD	12	22 Oct 1999	Joe Louis Arena, Detroit, Michigan, US	For WBC super-bantamweight title
25	Win	23–2	Len Martinez	UD	10	30 Aug 1999	The Joint, Paradise, Nevada, US	
24	Loss	22–2	Naseem Hamed	UD	12	31 Oct 1998	Boardwalk Hall, Atlantic City, New Jersey, US	For WBO featherweight title
23	Win	22–1	Juan Polo Perez	SD	10	19 May 1998	Memorial Coliseum, Corpus Christi, Texas, US	
22	Win	21–1	Antonio Oscar Salas	UD	10	7 Apr 1998	Mohegan Sun Arena, Montville, Connecticut, US	
21	Loss	20–1	Daniel Zaragoza	SD	12	11 Jan 1997	Hynes Convention Center, Boston, Massachusetts, US	For WBC super-bantamweight title
20	Win	20–0	Julio Cesar Cardona	UD	10	13 Jul 1996	Mammoth Events Center, Denver, Colorado, US	
19	Win	19–0	José Luis Bueno	SD	12	30 Mar 1996	Point Theatre, Dublin, Ireland	Retained WBC bantamweight title
18	Win	18–0	Johnny Bredahl	TKO	8 (12), 1:55	2 Dec 1995	King's Hall, Belfast, Northern Ireland	Retained WBC bantamweight title
17	Win	17–0	Yasuei Yakushiji	SD	12	30 Jul 1995	Aichi Prefectural Gymnasium, Nagoya, Japan	Won WBC bantamweight title
16	Win	16–0	Geronimo Cardoz	RTD	7 (10), 3:00	14 Mar 1995	Pontchartrain Center, Kenner, Louisiana, US	
15	Win	15–0	Fabrice Benichou	PTS	10	12 Nov 1994	Point Theatre, Dublin, Ireland	
14	Win	14–0	Andres Cazares	KO	3 (10), 2:59	15 Sep 1994	Silver Nugget, North Las Vegas, Nevada, US	
13	Win	13–0	Victor Rabanales	UD	12	17 Jun 1994	Etess Arena, Atlantic City, New Jersey, US	Retained NABF bantamweight title
12	Win	12–0	Mark Hargreaves	KO	3 (6)	19 Mar 1994	The Den, London, England	
11	Win	11–0	Javier Medina	TKO	7 (12), 2:44	18 Jan 1994	Civic Auditorium, Omaha, Nebraska, US	Won vacant NABF bantamweight title
10	Win	10–0	Jerome Coffee	RTD	5 (10)	30 Nov 1993	Civic Center, Pensacola, Florida, US	
9	Win	9–0	Andres Gonzalez	KO	2	9 Nov 1993	Fargodome, Fargo, North Dakota, US	
8	Win	8–0	Boualem Belkif	TKO	5 (10), 1:57	24 Sep 1993	National Stadium, Dublin, Ireland	
7	Win	7–0	Conn McMullen	TKO	3 (6), 2:43	18 Jun 1993	Maysfield Leisure Centre, Belfast, Northern Ireland	
6	Win	6–0	Luis Rosario	TKO	6 (6), 1:24	1 Jun 1993	The Blue Horizon, Philadelphia, Pennsylvania, US	
5	Win	5–0	Manuel Ramirez	TKO	5 (6)	4 May 1993	McNichols Sports Arena, Denver, Colorado, US	
4	Win	4–0	Oscar Lopez	RTD	4 (6), 3:00	16 Apr 1993	Cyclorama Building, Boston, Massachusetts, US	
3	Win	3–0	Oscar Zamora	UD	4	26 Mar 1993	Reseda Country Club, Los Angeles, California, US	
2	Win	2–0	Sergio Ramirez	KO	3 (4), 2:34	18 Mar 1993	Paramount Theatre, New York City, New York, US	
1	Win	1–0	Alfonso Zamora	TKO	4 (4), 0:39	23 Feb 1993	Reseda Country Club, Los Angeles, California, US	

== See also ==
- List of Irish sportspeople

Sporting positions
Regional boxing titles
Vacant Title last held by Elvis Álvarez	NABF bantamweight champion 18 January 1994 – September 1994; Vacated	Vacant Title next held by Paulie Ayala
World boxing titles
Preceded by Yasuei Yakushiji	WBC bantamweight champion 30 July 1995 – 11 January 1997; Vacated	Vacant Title next held by Sirimongkol Singwancha
