= Sirimongkol Singmanasak =

Thai boxer

Personal information
- Nicknames: Teppabud na yok (เทพบุตรหน้าหยก) ("Handsome Divinity")
- Born: Sirimongkhon Iamthuam; 2 June 1977 (age 49) Bueng Yitho, Thanyaburi, Pathum Thani, Thailand
- Height: 5 ft 6 in (168 cm)
- Weight: Flyweight; Super-flyweight; Bantamweight; Super-featherweight; Lightweight; Light-welterweight; Welterweight; Light-middleweight; Middleweight; Light-heavyweight; Cruiserweight; Heavyweight

Boxing career
- Reach: 72 in (183 cm)
- Stance: Orthodox

Boxing record
- Total fights: 111
- Wins: 102
- Win by KO: 65
- Losses: 9

Sirimongkol Singmanasak (Thai: ศิริมงคล สิงห์มนัสศักดิ์; born 2 June 1977) is a Thai professional boxer, bare-knuckle boxer and kickboxer. He is a world champion in two weight classes, having held the World Boxing Council (WBC) bantamweight title in 1997, and the WBC super-featherweight title from 2002 to 2003. His other names were Sirimongkol Nakhon Thong Park View (ศิริมงคล นครทองปาร์ควิว), Sirimongkol Singwancha (ศิริมงคล สิงห์วังชา), Sirimongkol Nakornloung (ศิริมงคล นครหลวงโปรโมชั่น), and Sirimongkhon Iamthuam (ศิริมงคล เอี่ยมท้วม).

== Biography and boxing career ==
Sirimongkol was born into a family closely connected to Muay Thai, with his father owning the "Singmanasak Boxing Gym" (ค่ายมวยสิงห์มนัสศักดิ์) and his brother fighting under the name "Manopchai Singmanasak" (มานพชัย สิงห์มนัสศักดิ์). His early interests in the Thai folk theatre form Likay were curtailed by his father, who encouraged him to pursue boxing instead.

=== WBC world champion ===
Starting as an amateur in high school, Sirimongkol quickly ascended in professional boxing. He claimed the WBU Super flyweight and Bantamweight titles in 1995 and became the WBC Bantamweight Champion in August 1996 at just 19 years old, defeating interim champion José Luis Bueno in Phitsanulok, Thailand. His title shot was earned through a victory over veteran Thai boxer Thanomsak Sithbaobay.

Sirimongkol successfully defended his WBC bantamweight title three times. However, his reign ended in November 1997 when he lost to former Japanese world champion Joichiro Tatsuyoshi in Osaka, Japan. He rebounded strongly, capturing the WBC Super featherweight title in 2002 with a knockout win over Kengo Nagashima, but lost the title a year later to Jesús Chávez.

=== Post-world title reign ===
In May 2007, Sirimongkol won the Asian Boxing Council (ABCO) super featherweight title. He then won the PABA light welterweight title in December 2007 before defending the title once in May 2008.

=== Arrest and later career ===
In 2009, Sirimongkol's career took a turn following his arrest for possession of Ya ba. During his incarceration, he taught boxing to fellow inmates and continued to compete, winning the WBC Asia Continental Welterweight title. He successfully defended the WBC Asia Continental belt five times from 2012 to 2014. He was pardoned four years into a 20-year sentence.

In October 2014, Sirimongkol defeated Dan Nazareno Jr. to win the WBO Asia Pacific junior middleweight title. He defended the WBO Asia Pacific belt twice in April 2015 and September 2015.

His 51-fight winning streak was finally broken in 2017 by Uzbek boxer Azizbek Abdugofurov in an unsuccessful bid for the WBC Asia middleweight title, marking his first defeat in 14 years.

After winning the UBO Inter-Continental light middleweight title in May 2017 and the Thai light heavyweight title September 2018, Sirimongkol announced his first retirement from boxing on September 20, 2018. He came out of retirement for two more fights, including unsuccessfully challenging Teerachai Sithmorseng for the WBA Asia light heavyweight title in April 2021, before retiring once again.

=== Bare-knuckle boxing ===
Sirimongkol made his bare-knuckle boxing debut at BKFC Thailand 1: The Game Changer on December 18, 2021, fighting under his real name of "Sirimongkol Iamthuam". His opponent was Iranian Brazilian jiu-jitsu and full contact karate practitioner Reza Goodary. Despite standing 168 cm and Goodary standing 195 cm, Sirimongkol controlled the majority of the fight and scored a knockdown to win via split decision.

==== BKFC Thailand Champion ====
Sirimongkol faced Mike Vetrila for the inaugural BKFC Thailand Light Heavyweight Championship at BKFC Thailand 2: Iconic Impact on May 7, 2022. He won the close fight via majority decision to become the first BKFC Thailand Light Heavyweight Champion.

== Entertainment career ==
Sirimongkol, known for his striking appearance, was dubbed "Teppabud na yok" ("handsome divinity") by his Thai boxing fans. After losing the WBC world title in 1997, he transitioned into show business. His ventures included modeling for a women's fashion magazine, appearing on the 2003 Thai TV drama "Pret Wat Suthat" on Channel 7 and the 2008 martial arts film "Chocolate", and featuring in a music video by the rock band The Tycoon alongside Dom Hetrakul in 2000.

In 2005, Sirimongkol faced a scandal involving nude photos. Police discovered gay pornographic magazines featuring his photos being sold at Or Tor Kor Market. This incident was covered by various media outlets.

== Professional boxing record ==
111 fights	102 wins	9 losses
By knockout	65	4
By decision	37	5

No.	Result	Record	Opponent	Type	Round, time	Date	Location	Notes
111	Loss	101-9	Nurbek Valizhonov	SD	10	1 Aug 2026	World Siam Stadium, Bangkok, Thailand	For vacant WBA Asia cruiserweight title
110	Won	102-8	Pornwissanu Suwaros	TKO	2 (8), 1:13	25 Jan 2026	Singmanassak Muaythai School, Pathum Thani, Thailand	Won vacant Thai heavyweight title
109	Loss	101–8	Nick Midgey	TKO	2 (12), 1:04	18 Oct 2025	Singamanassak Muaythai School, Pathum Thani, Thailand	For vacant WBF (Foundation) cruiserweight title
108	Win	101–7	Nitthikorn Ritthikrai	TKO	1 (6), 2:14	29 Sep 2025	Singamanassak Muaythai School, Pathum Thani, Thailand	
107	Loss	100–7	Nick Midgey	TKO	3 (10), 1:07	23 Aug 2025	Fitzys, Logan City, Australia	For vacant WBF International heavyweight title
106	Win	100–6	Thoedsak Sinam	TKO	1 (8), 1:18	27 Jul 2025	Singamanassak Muaythai School, Pathum Thani, Thailand	
105	Loss	99–6	Matt Floyd	UD	12	27 Dec 2024	Marriott Hotel Ankara, Ankara, Turkey	For vacant UBO cruiserweight title
104	Win	99–5	Matt Floyd	SD	12	6 Oct 2024	Lumpinee Boxing Stadium, Bangkok, Thailand	Won vacant WBF (Foundation) light-heavyweight title
103	Win	98–5	Yuttana Wongda	UD	6	17 Mar 2024	Singmanassak Muaythai School, Pathum Thani, Thailand	
102	Loss	97–5	Teerachai Sithmorseng	RTD	6 (10)	24 Apr 2021	Suanlum Night Bazaar, Bangkok, Thailand	For WBA Asia light-heavyweight title
101	Win	97–4	Thikhamporn Parnkerd	TKO	1 (4)	1 Dec 2019	Muaythai School, Pathum Thani, Thailand	
100	Win	96–4	Muhammad Nsubuga	KO	2 (8)	1 Sep 2018	Muaythai School, Pathum Thani, Thailand	Won vacant Thai light-heavyweight title
99	Loss	95–4	Tommy Browne	UD	10	20 Oct 2017	Suntec Int. Convention Centre, Singapore	For vacant IBO Asia Pacific light-middleweight title
98	Win	95–3	Larry Siwu	SD	10	27 May 2017	Resorts World Sentosa, Singapore	Won vacant UBO Inter Continental light-middleweight title
97	Loss	94–3	Azizbek Abdugofurov	UD	12	10 Feb 2017	Far East Square, Singapore	For ABCO middleweight title
96	Win	94–2	Carlos Roberto	UD	12	29 Sep 2016	SP Kansard Company, Bangkok, Thailand	
95	Win	93–2	Chaokeng Laos PDR	TKO	3 (6)	23 Jun 2016	Satrimahapuektharam School, Bangkok, Thailand	
94	Win	92–2	Zhao Shu Song	UD	6	28 Apr 2016	Morseng Center, Udon Thani, Thailand	
93	Win	91–2	Willy Whipple	TKO	8 (10)	26 Jan 2016	Wat Itisukto, Hua Hin, Thailand	
92	Win	90–2	Felipe Nascimento	UD	6	12 Nov 2015	RMUTT, Pathum Thani, Thailand	
91	Win	89–2	Saidi Mundi	KO	3 (12)	15 Sep 2015	Floating Market, Sai Noi	Retained WBO Asia Pacific light-middleweight title
90	Win	88–2	Mohamed Larabi	UD	6	18 Aug 2015	Pathum Thani, Thailand	
89	Win	87–2	Dan Nazareno Jr.	UD	12	7 Apr 2015	Mahachai Villa Market, Samut Sakhon	Retained WBO Asia Pacific light-middleweight title
88	Win	86–2	Jacob Martinez	KO	3 (6)	28 Jan 2015	Wat Itisukto, Hua Hin, Thailand	
87	Win	85–2	Alexey Akimenko	RTD	2 (6)	28 Dec 2014	Wongwianyai, Bangkok, Thailand	
86	Win	84–2	Dan Nazareno Jr.	UD	12	15 Oct 2014	Bueng Phraya Floating Market, Bangkok, Thailand	Won vacant WBO Asia Pacific light-middleweight title
85	Win	83–2	Omari Ramadan	KO	3 (12)	29 Jul 2014	Prachathipat school, Pathum Thani, Thailand	Retained ABCO Continental welterweight title
84	Win	82–2	Victor Nunez	KO	4 (6)	17 Jun 2014	Mahachai Stadium, Samut Sakhon, Thailand	
83	Win	81–2	Barak Sithyodthong	KO	2 (6)	9 Apr 2014	Wat Sakaew School, Ang Thong, Thailand	
82	Win	80–2	Xingxin Yang	RTD	6 (12)	5 Feb 2014	City Hall, Haikou, China	Retained ABCO Continental welterweight title
81	Win	79–2	Felipe Nascimento	KO	2 (6)	28 Dec 2013	Wongwianyai, Bangkok, Thailand	
80	Win	78–2	Jovany Rota	KO	1 (12)	12 Dec 2013	Mahachai Villa Arena, Samut Sakhon, Thailand	Retained ABCO Continental welterweight title
79	Win	77–2	Ronnel Esparas	KO	3 (12)	17 Sep 2013	13 Coins Resort, Phraram 9, Bangkok, Thailand	Retained ABCO Continental welterweight title
78	Win	76–2	Nicolas Lameche	KO	3 (6)	13 Aug 2013	13 Coins Resort, Phraram 9, Bangkok, Thailand	
77	Win	75–2	Ekeni Kritov	TKO	3 (6)	9 Jul 2013	13 Coins Resort, Phraram 9, Bangkok, Thailand	
76	Win	74–2	Mohamadreza Hamze	TKO	6 (12)	14 May 2013	Rangsit Stadium, Rangsit, Thailand	Retained ABCO Continental welterweight title
75	Win	73–2	Mohammad Faisol	TKO	3 (6)	21 Apr 2013	Klongphai, Nakhon Ratchasima, Thailand	
74	Win	72–2	Mohammad Faisol	KO	3 (6)	1 Mar 2013	Terdthai Market, Ladkrabang, Bangkok, Thailand	
73	Win	71–2	Muhammad Nsubuga	KO	6 (12)	6 Jan 2013	Klongphai, Nakhon Ratchasima, Thailand	
72	Win	70–2	Dennis Padua	KO	5 (12)	14 Nov 2012	Wanglee Ground, Pathum Thani, Thailand	Won vacant ABCO Continental welterweight title
71	Win	69–2	Peter Pikinik	PTS	6	18 Sep 2012	KMUTT, Bangkok, Thailand	
70	Win	68–2	Eagle	TKO	3 (6)	30 Jul 2012	Central Correctional Instituti, Pathum Thani, Thailand	
69	Win	67–2	Umar Ssemata	KO	6 (6)	28 Apr 2012	Old City Hall, Ayutthaya, Thailand	
68	Win	66–2	Mohamadreza Hamze	UD	12	3 Dec 2011	Doem Bang Nang Buat, Thailand	
67	Win	65–2	Peter Pikinik	TKO	2 (6)	22 Aug 2011	Central Correctional Instituti, Pathum Thani, Thailand	
66	Win	64–2	Mohammed Saleh	KO	3 (6)	29 Apr 2011	Nongsuor School, Pathum Thani, Thailand	
65	Win	63–2	Mohammed Saleh	KO	2 (6)	12 Aug 2009	Nakhon Ratchisima Zoo, Nakhon Ratchasima, Thailand	
64	Win	62–2	Michael Nigro	KO	1 (6)	1 Aug 2009	Muaythai School, Pathum Thani, Thailand	
63	Win	61–2	Mohammed Saleh	KO	2 (6)	5 Jun 2009	Ringping Riverside, Kamphaeng Phet, Thailand	
62	Win	60–2	Rogelio Castañeda Jr.	MD	8	22 Nov 2008	MGM Grand Garden Arena, Paradise, Nevada, U.S.	
61	Win	59–2	Chad Bennett	TKO	1 (12)	24 May 2008	Honeysuckle Boiler Room, Newcastle, Australia	Retained PABA light-welterweight title
60	Win	58–2	Arnel Porras	UD	12	21 Dec 2007	Sukhothai Thammathirat University, Pak Kret, Thailand	Won vacant PABA light-welterweight title
59	Win	57–2	Kaennakorn Bangbuathong	TKO	4 (8)	14 Sep 2007	Potawattana Saenee School, Ratchaburi, Thailand	
58	Win	56–2	Anukun Kulamun	UD	12	1 May 2007	Nonthaburi, Thailand	Won ABCO super-featherweight title
57	Win	55–2	Jesus Kibunde Kakonge	UD	6	21 Mar 2007	Amornsap Yuwittaya, Nongjork, Bangkok, Thailand	
56	Win	54–2	Lito Gonzaga	KO	3 (10)	18 Jul 2006	The Mall Bangkapi, Bangkok, Thailand	
55	Win	53–2	Hayato Takabayashi	UD	6	10 Mar 2006	Rachabhak University, Petchaburi, Thailand	
54	Win	52–2	Chao Liang	TKO	4 (10)	21 Dec 2005	Bangkhuntien, Bangkok, Thailand	
53	Win	51–2	Wuxiao Song	KO	7 (10)	7 Nov 2005	Central Correctional Instituti, Pathum Thani, Thailand	
52	Win	50–2	Arnel Tinampay	UD	8	28 Sep 2005	The Mall Shopping Center, Bangkok, Thailand	
51	Win	49–2	Rodney Jun Alba	TKO	4 (6)	5 Jul 2005	Impact Arena, Muang Thong Thani, Thailand	
50	Win	48–2	Michael Clark	TKO	7 (12)	14 May 2005	MGM Grand Garden Arena, Paradise, Nevada, U.S.	
49	Win	47–2	Donny Suratin	UD	6	4 Feb 2005	STOU, Pak Kret, Thailand	
48	Win	46–2	Fernando Montilla	UD	8	9 Sep 2004	Chumphon, Thailand	
47	Win	45–2	Larry Pelonia	TKO	8 (8)	15 Jul 2004	Khon Kaen, Thailand	
46	Win	44–2	Wuli Mthembu	KO	1 (6)	21 May 2004	Nonthai District, Nakhon Ratchasima, Thailand	
45	Loss	43–2	Jesús Chávez	UD	12	15 Aug 2003	Convention Center, Austin, Texas, U.S.	Lost WBC super-featherweight title
44	Win	43–1	Anthony Tshehla	TKO	6 (10)	1 May 2003	The Mall Bangkae, Bangkok, Thailand	
43	Win	42–1	Choi Yong-soo	UD	12	13 Jan 2003	Korakuen Hall, Tokyo	Retained WBC super-featherweight title
42	Win	41–1	Richard Cabillo	TKO	2 (6)	25 Oct 2002	The Mall Shopping Center, Nonthaburi, Thailand	
41	Win	40–1	Kengo Nagashima	KO	2 (12)	24 Aug 2002	Ryōgoku Kokugikan, Yokoami, Japan	Won vacant WBC super-featherweight title
40	Win	39–1	Christopher Saluday	KO	6 (10)	1 May 2002	Nonthaburi, Thailand	
39	Win	38–1	Isagani Pumar	KO	3 (?)	30 Mar 2002	Nonthaburi, Thailand	
38	Win	37–1	Rex Marzan	KO	3 (10)	11 Jan 2002	Thanyaburi, Thailand	
37	Win	36–1	Arman Molina	TKO	4 (10)	19 Oct 2001	Bangkok, Thailand	
36	Win	35–1	Jerry DeGarcia	KO	8 (10)	1 Sep 2001	Bangkok, Thailand	
35	Win	34–1	Gabby Montano	KO	4 (?)	12 Jul 2001	Bangkok, Thailand	
34	Win	33–1	Nori Fapuro	KO	3 (9)	4 May 2001	Nonthaburi, Thailand	
33	Win	32–1	Teofilo Tunacao	TKO	2 (10)	5 Dec 2000	Royal Promenade-Sanam Luang, Bangkok, Thailand	
32	Win	31–1	Dondon Colas	TKO	1 (8)	18 Oct 2000	Bangkok, Thailand	
31	Win	30–1	Jonathan Mercado	TKO	7 (?)	25 Jun 2000	Bangkok, Thailand	
30	Win	29–1	Francis Velasquez	TKO	5 (?)	19 Apr 2000	Bangkok, Thailand	
29	Win	28–1	Ali Albaracin	KO	2 (?)	11 Mar 2000	Municipal Stadium, Aranyaprathet, Thailand	
28	Win	27–1	Al Jongjong Abao	TKO	3 (?)	19 Jan 2000	Bangkok, Thailand	
27	Win	26–1	Jerry DeGarcia	PTS	10	17 Nov 1999	Bangkok, Thailand	
26	Win	25–1	Francis Velasquez	TKO	9 (?)	15 Sep 1999	Bangkok, Thailand	
25	Win	24–1	Nonoy Gonzales	UD	10	21 Jul 1999	Bangkok, Thailand	
24	Win	23–1	Jerry DeGarcia	PTS	8	21 May 1999	National Stadium, Sara Buri, Thailand	
23	Win	22–1	Ramon Molina	KO	5 (?)	17 Mar 1999	Bangkok, Thailand	
22	Win	21–1	Jun Balabat	UD	10	20 Jan 1999	Bangkok, Thailand	
21	Win	20–1	Sukhbayar Nemekbayar	PTS	10	18 Nov 1998	Bangkok, Thailand	
20	Win	19–1	Ric Ramirez	PTS	10	16 Sep 1998	Bangkok, Thailand	
19	Win	18–1	Sukhbayar Nemekbayar	PTS	10	17 Jun 1998	Bangkok, Thailand	
18	Win	17–1	Edwin Casano	KO	1 (?)	13 May 1998	Bangkok, Thailand	
17	Loss	16–1	Joichiro Tatsuyoshi	TKO	7 (12)	22 Nov 1997	Osaka-jō Hall, Osaka, Japan	Lost WBC bantamweight title
16	Win	16–0	Victor Rabanales	UD	12	4 Jul 1997	Pattani, Thailand	Retained WBC bantamweight title
15	Win	15–0	Javier Campanario	KO	4 (12)	26 Apr 1997	Patong Beach Soccer Grounds, Patong, Thailand	Retained WBC bantamweight title
14	Win	14–0	Jesus Sarabia	UD	12	15 Feb 1997	Nakornpanom Stadium, Nakhon Phanom, Thailand	Retained WBC bantamweight title
13	Win	13–0	José Luis Bueno	TKO	5 (12)	10 Aug 1996	Soccer Stadium, Phitsanulok, Thailand	Won WBC interim bantamweight title
12	Win	12–0	Thanomsak Sithbaobay	TKO	3 (?)	5 May 1996	Bangkok, Thailand	WBC interim bantamweight title eliminator
11	Win	11–0	Arturo Estrada	UD	12	23 Mar 1996	Ban Phai Shopping Centre, Ban Phai, Thailand	Retained WBU bantamweight title
10	Win	10–0	Miguel Espinoza	UD	12	23 Dec 1995	Channel 7 Studios, Bangkok, Thailand	Won vacant WBU bantamweight title
9	Win	9–0	Juanito Boy Cuma	UD	12	5 Aug 1995	Channel 7 Studios, Bangkok, Thailand	Won vacant WBU super-flyweight title
8	Win	8–0	Alberto Campanina	PTS	10	21 Jun 1995	Bangkok, Thailand	
7	Win	7–0	Ledion Ceniza	PTS	10	19 Apr 1995	Bangkok, Thailand	
6	Win	6–0	Ricky Flor	KO	6 (?)	15 Feb 1995	Channel 7 Studios, Bangkok, Thailand	
5	Win	5–0	Jun Lansaderas	TKO	5 (?)	21 Dec 1994	Channel 7 Studios, Bangkok, Thailand	
4	Win	4–0	Alberto Campanina	PTS	10	12 Oct 1994	Channel 7 Studios, Bangkok, Thailand	
3	Win	3–0	Emil Romano	TKO	5 (10)	17 Aug 1994	Channel 7 Studios, Bangkok, Thailand	
2	Win	2–0	Joel Nice	PTS	10	15 Jun 1994	Channel 7 Studios, Bangkok, Thailand	
1	Win	1–0	Ritichai Kiatprapas	PTS	6	18 May 1994	Channel 7 Studios, Bangkok, Thailand	

== Bare knuckle record ==
Professional record breakdown
2 matches	2 wins	0 losses
By decision	2	0

Res.	Record	Opponent	Method	Event	Date	Round	Time	Location	Notes
Win	2–0	Mike Vetrila	Decision (majority)	BKFC Thailand 2	May 7, 2022	5	2:00	Pattaya, Thailand	Won the inaugural BKFC Thailand Light Heavyweight Championship.
Win	1–0	Reza Goodary	Decision (split)	BKFC Thailand 1	December 18, 2021	5	2:00	Pattaya, Thailand	

== Titles in boxing ==
=== Major world titles ===
- WBC bantamweight champion (118 lbs)
- WBC super-featherweight champion (130 lbs)

=== Interim world titles ===
- WBC interim bantamweight champion (118 lbs)

=== Minor world titles ===
- WBU super-flyweight champion (115 lbs)
- WBU bantamweight champion (118 lbs)
- WBF (Foundation) light-heavyweight champion (175 lbs)

=== Regional/International titles ===
- ABCO super-featherweight champion (130 lbs)
- PABA light-welterweight champion (140 lbs)
- WBO Asia Pacific light-welterweight champion (140 lbs)
- ABCO Continental welterweight champion (147 lbs)
- UBO Inter Continental light-middleweight champion (154 lbs)
- Thai light-heavyweight champion (175 lbs)
- Thai heavyweight champion (200+ lbs)

== See also ==
- List of world bantamweight boxing champions
- List of world super-featherweight boxing champions

Sporting positions
World boxing titles
Vacant Title last held by Joichiro Tatsuyoshi	WBC bantamweight champion Interim title 10 August 1996 – 11 January 1997; Promoted	Vacant Title next held by Takuma Inoue
Vacant Title last held by Wayne McCullough	WBC bantamweight champion 11 January 1997 – 22 November 1997	Succeeded by Joichiro Tatsuyoshi
Vacant Title last held by Floyd Mayweather Jr.	WBC super-featherweight champion 24 August 2002 – 15 August 2003	Succeeded by Jesús Chávez
