= Byun Jung-il =

South Korean boxer (born 1968)

Personal information
- Nationality: South Korean
- Born: 변정일; November 16, 1968 (age 57) Seoul, South Korea
- Height: 5 ft 6 in (168 cm)
- Weight: Bantamweight

Boxing career
- Stance: Southpaw

Boxing record
- Total fights: 12
- Wins: 10
- Win by KO: 4
- Losses: 2

Byun Jung-il (born 16 November 1968 in Seoul) is a former South Korean professional boxer. He competed in the men's bantamweight event at the 1988 Summer Olympics.

== Amateur career ==
At the 1988 Seoul Olympics, Byun defeated Jean-Marc Augustin of France in the first round of the bantamweight competition. In the second round, he refused to leave the ring after losing a 4-1 decision to Aleksandar Khristov of Bulgaria. He was penalized two points by New Zealand referee Keith Walker for headbutting. He sat by himself in the ring for over an hour. Eventually, match officials turned the lights out and left him in darkness. Byun's actions were reminiscent of another Korean boxer who staged a lengthy sit-in after being disqualified at the 1964 Tokyo Olympics.

== Professional career ==
Byun turned professional in 1990 and in 1993 defeated Victor Rabanales for the WBC bantamweight title by decision in his ninth fight. He lost the belt later that year to Yasuei Yakushiji, and lost a rematch to Yakushiji the following year. He retired after the loss.

== Professional boxing record ==
12 fights	10 wins	2 losses
By knockout	4	1
By decision	6	1

No.	Result	Record	Opponent	Type	Round, time	Date	Location	Notes
12	Loss	10–2	(Japan) Yasuei Yakushiji	TKO	11 (12), 0:52	31 Jul 1994	Aichi Prefectural Gymnasium, Nagoya, Japan	For WBC bantamweight title
11	Loss	10–1	(Japan) Yasuei Yakushiji	SD	12	23 Dec 1993	Aichi Prefectural Gymnasium, Nagoya, Japan	Lost WBC bantamweight title
10	Win	10–0	(Mexico) Josefino Suarez	UD	12	28 May 1993	Intercontinental Hotel, Seoul, South Korea	Retained WBC bantamweight title
9	Win	9–0	(Mexico) Victor Rabanales	UD	12	28 Mar 1993	Hyundai Hotel, Gyeongju, South Korea	Won WBC bantamweight title
8	Win	8–0	(Thailand) Suksawat Torboonlert	KO	4 (10), 2:45	10 Jan 1993	Gyeongju, South Korea	
7	Win	7–0	(Philippines) Rey Paciones	UD	10	16 Aug 1992	Daegu, South Korea	
6	Win	6–0	(Indonesia) Tarman Garzim	KO	9 (10), 1:53	4 Feb 1992	Seoul, South Korea	
5	Win	5–0	(Puerto Rico) William Ramos	PTS	10	2 Nov 1991	Olympic Park Gymnasium, Seoul, South Korea	
4	Win	4–0	(Venezuela) David Merchant	UD	10	14 Jul 1991	Seoul, South Korea	
3	Win	3–0	(Philippines) Rey Parreno	KO	3 (10), 2:21	10 Mar 1991	Seoul, South Korea	
2	Win	2–0	(Philippines) Eddie Torres	KO	9 (10), 1:08	18 Nov 1990	Munhwa Gymnasium, Seoul, South Korea	
1	Win	1–0	(Philippines) Noel Cornelio	PTS	8	18 Feb 1990	Suwon, South Korea	

== See also ==
- List of bantamweight boxing champions

Achievements
Preceded by Victor Rabanales	WBC Bantamweight champion March 28, 1993 – December 23, 1993	Succeeded by Yasuei Yakushiji
