= Joichiro Tatsuyoshi =

Japanese boxer

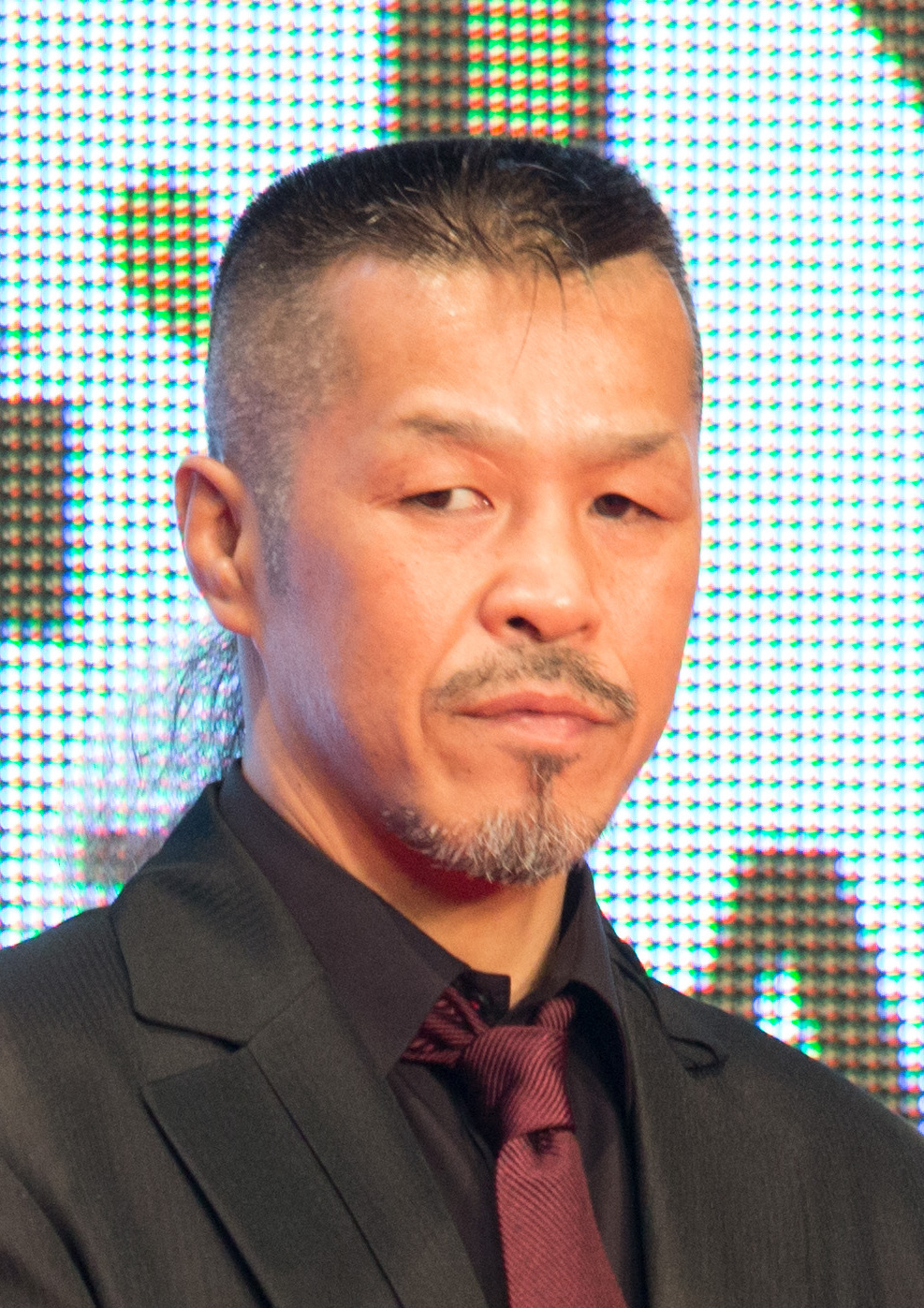
- Joichiro Tatsuyoshi, in 2015

Personal information
- Nickname: Naniwa no Joe
- Nationality: Japanese
- Born: 辰吉丈一郎; May 15, 1970 (age 56) Kurashiki, Japan
- Height: 5 ft 5 in (165 cm)
- Weight: Bantamweight; Super bantamweight

Boxing career
- Reach: 65 in (165 cm)
- Stance: Orthodox

Boxing record
- Total fights: 28
- Wins: 20
- Win by KO: 14
- Losses: 7
- Draws: 1

Joichiro Tatsuyoshi (辰吉丈一郎, Tatsuyoshi Jōichirō; born May 15, 1970) is a former World Boxing Council (WBC) world bantamweight champion from Kurashiki, Okayama, Japan. His record is 20–7–1 (14 KOs).

He is popular for his fight style and unique personality, and has appeared in several television variety shows.

He is named after Joe Yabuki, the main character of the boxing anime, Ashita no Joe (Tomorrow's Joe). Coincidentally, he fights in the same weight class (bantamweight) as the character he is named after.

He has a large reach in comparison with his height (Tatsuyoshi is 164 cm tall with a reach of 178 cm) and is known for his distinctively low guard. He often keeps his hands in front of his chest, unlike other boxers who usually keep their hands closer to the head.

He is managed by the Osaka Teiken boxing gym.

== Biography ==
Tatsuyoshi's father was a boxing fan and began training his son when he was a toddler. After graduating from middle school, Tatsuyoshi moved to Osaka to begin training, working part-time at restaurants to support himself. Tatsyoshi won the Japanese amateur bantamweight championship at age 17, becoming a candidate for the Seoul Olympics. Tatsuyoshi was featured in a local Kansai newspaper as one of Japan's best young boxers. His amateur record was 18–1–0.

Tatsuyoshi turned pro in 1989 and won the Japanese Bantamweight in his fourth professional fight. He won the WBC World Bantamweight Title in his eighth professional fight in 1991, the fastest of any Japanese boxer (Nobuo Nashiro tied this record in 2006, winning the WBA Super Flyweight Title in his eighth fight). However, he was discovered to have a torn retina while training for his first title defense, forcing him into rehabilitation.

Almost a full year after winning the title, Tatsuyoshi fought Victor Rabanales, who had become the WBC Interim Champion during Tatsuyoshi's inactivity. Tatsuyoshi lost by TKO in the ninth round but vowed revenge, claiming it was his twin brother "Joujirou" who had lost the fight. Tatsuyoshi fought Rabanales again on July 22, 1993, for the WBC World Bantamweight Interim Title, defeating Rabanales by 12-round decision. In September of the same year, he was found to have another eye injury; this time a detached left retina, forcing him to give up his interim title and nearly forcing him into retirement. Tatsuyoshi managed to continue his career, making a comeback in July 1994 in Hawaii, knocking out his opponent in three rounds. The WBC returned the interim title to Tatsuyoshi after the fight.

In December, 1994, Tatsuyoshi fought WBC Bantamweight Champion Yasuei Yakushiji. Being a title match between two Japanese fighters, the match generated huge media attention, and Tatsuyoshi was a huge favorite to win. However, he ended with a loss by 12-round decision, losing his interim title.

Tatsuyoshi challenged the WBC Super Bantamweight Champion twice in 1996 and 1997, but lost both times. Many began to believe he was no longer capable of fighting at the world level, and in November 1997, Tatsuyoshi challenged undefeated WBC Bantamweight Champion Sirimongkol Singmanasak, with the intent of retiring if he failed to win. Despite the odds, he won by TKO in seventh round, reclaiming his title after three years.

Tatsuyoshi recorded two title defenses before losing to Veeraphol Sahaprom on December 29, 1998. He challenged Sahaprom in August 1999, but lost again in the seventh round, and announced his retirement after the fight. He changed his mind shortly afterwards and resumed his training, making a comeback fight on December 15, 2002, winning by TKO after more than three years of inactivity. He won again in September 2003, but fell into inactivity again after injuring his left knee. There are no plans for a next fight, but he still trains with his son, Jukiya, who wishes to follow his father into professional boxing.

== Professional boxing record ==
28 fights	20 wins	7 losses
By knockout	14	5
By decision	6	2
Draws	1	

No.	Result	Record	Opponent	Type	Round, time	Date	Location	Notes
28	Loss	20–7–1	(Thailand) Sakai Jockygym	TKO	7 (10), 1:03	8 Mar 2009	(Thailand) Rajadamnern Stadium, Bangkok	
27	Win	20–6–1	(Thailand) Parakorn Charoendee	TKO	2 (10), 2:47	26 Oct 2008	(Thailand) Rajadamnern Stadium, Bangkok	
26	Win	19–6–1	(Mexico) Julio Cesar Avila	UD	10	26 Sep 2003	(Japan) Prefectural Gymnasium, Osaka	
25	Win	18–6–1	(Thailand) Saen Sor Ploenchit	TKO	6 (10), 1:10	15 Dec 2002	(Japan) Prefectural Gymnasium, Osaka	
24	Loss	17–6–1	(Thailand) Veeraphol Sahaprom	TKO	7 (12), 0:44	29 Aug 1999	(Japan) Kyocera Dome, Osaka	For WBC bantamweight title
23	Loss	17–5–1	(Thailand) Veeraphol Sahaprom	TKO	6 (12), 2:52	29 Dec 1998	(Japan) Osaka Municipal Central Gymnasium, Osaka	Lost WBC bantamweight title
22	Win	17–4–1	(United States) Paulie Ayala	TD	6 (12), 3:00	23 Aug 1998	(Japan) Yokohama Arena, Yokohama	Retained WBC bantamweight title; Unanimous TD after Tatsuyoshi cut from accidental head clash
21	Win	16–4–1	(Argentina) Jose Rafael Sosa	UD	12	8 Mar 1998	(Japan) Yokohama Arena, Yokohama	Retained WBC bantamweight title
20	Win	15–4–1	(Thailand) Sirimongkol Singmanasak	TKO	7 (12), 1:54	22 Nov 1997	(Japan) Osaka-jō Hall, Osaka	Won WBC bantamweight title
19	Win	14–4–1	(Mexico) Ricardo Medina	UD	10	26 Jul 1997	(Japan) Yokohama Arena, Yokohama	
18	Loss	13–4–1	(Mexico) Daniel Zaragoza	UD	12	14 Apr 1997	(Japan) Prefectural Gymnasium, Osaka	For WBC super bantamweight title
17	Win	13–3–1	(Mexico) Fernando Alanis	TKO	10 (10), 1:02	21 Dec 1996	(United States) Planet Hollywood, Las Vegas	
16	Loss	12–3–1	(Mexico) Daniel Zaragoza	TKO	11 (12), 2:47	3 Mar 1996	(Japan) Yokohama Arena, Yokohama	For WBC super bantamweight title
15	Win	12–2–1	(Mexico) Geronimo Cardoz	TKO	8 (10), 2:55	25 Nov 1995	(United States) Mirage Hotel & Casino, Las Vegas	
14	Win	11–2–1	(Mexico) Noe Santillana	TKO	9 (10), 2:59	26 Aug 1995	(United States) Planet Hollywood, Las Vegas	
13	Loss	10–2–1	(Japan) Yasuei Yakushiji	MD	12	4 Dec 1994	(Japan) Nippon Gaishi Hall, Nagoya	For WBC bantamweight title
12	Win	10–1–1	(Mexico) Josefino Suarez	KO	3 (10), 2:48	2 Jul 1994	(United States) Blaisdell Center Arena, Honolulu	
11	Win	9–1–1	(Mexico) Victor Rabanales	SD	12	22 Jul 1993	(Japan) Prefectural Gymnasium, Osaka	Won interim WBC bantamweight title
10	Win	8–1–1	(Mexico) Jose Luis Vegagil	KO	2 (10), 1:55	11 Feb 1993	(Japan) Prefectural Gymnasium, Osaka	
9	Loss	7–1–1	(Mexico) Victor Rabanales	TKO	9 (12), 1:19	17 Sep 1992	(Japan) Osaka-jō Hall, Osaka	Lost WBC bantamweight title
8	Win	7–0–1	(United States) Greg Richardson	RTD	10 (12), 3:00	19 Sep 1991	(Japan) City Gymnasium, Moriguchi	Won WBC bantamweight title
7	Win	6–0–1	(Philippines) Rey Paciones	UD	10	19 May 1991	(Japan) Prefectural Gymnasium, Osaka	
6	Draw	5–0–1	(Venezuela) Abraham Torres	PTS	10	17 Feb 1991	(Japan) Korakuen Hall, Tokyo	
5	Win	5–0	(Philippines) Jun Cardinal	KO	2 (10), 3:04	18 Dec 1990	(Japan) Prefectural Gymnasium, Osaka	
4	Win	4–0	(Japan) Shigeru Okabe	KO	4 (10), 2:51	11 Sep 1990	(Japan) Korakuen Hall, Tokyo	Won Japanese bantamweight title
3	Win	3–0	(Philippines) Samuel Duran	KO	7 (10), 2:10	28 Jun 1990	(Japan) Prefectural Gymnasium, Osaka	
2	Win	2–0	(Thailand) Somsak Srichan	KO	2 (10), 2:18	11 Feb 1990	(Japan) Tokyo Dome, Tokyo	
1	Win	1–0	(South Korea) Sang Myon Choi	KO	2 (6), 0:47	29 Sep 1989	(Japan) Prefectural Gymnasium, Osaka	

== Personal life ==
Tatsuyoshi admitted that he was bullied during his early childhood. He overcame it through boxing and never lost a street fight during his teens. He says he never used his fists when street fighting, because a bare knuckle punch could severely injure his opponent. He used open-handed slaps and elbows instead. Because of his experiences, Tatsuyoshi has appeared in public advertisements condemning bullying.

He is known to train exceptionally hard. Trainers used to keep their young boxers away from Tatsuyoshi, not because he might injure the younger boxers in a sparring session, but because the younger fighters might give up after seeing the enormous amount of time Tatsuyoshi spent training.

After losing an amateur bout, he left his gym for about half a year, homeless. He met his current wife at a cafe he stopped by during this period. Tatsuyoshi credits his wife for giving him the strength to return to his gym.

He is friends with comedian Hitoshi Matsumoto of Downtown and has appeared on his show Downtown DX. He is also friends with baseball star Ichiro Suzuki, who has attended several of Tatsuyoshi's fights.

He has appeared numerous times in the popular Japanese boxing manga Hajime no Ippo.

== Retirement ==
Tatsuyoshi turned 37 in May 2007. Tatsuyoshi had suffered several serious injuries, and his management has expressed a desire to not see him take further damage, making it difficult for him to fight in Japan. Tatsuyoshi "resurfaced" in Thailand in 2008 to continue his career abroad. When commentating on televised boxing matches, Tatsuyoshi has shown clear signs of being punch drunk (slurred speech and forgetfulness), worrying his fans.

== See also ==
- List of bantamweight boxing champions
- List of Japanese boxing world champions
- Boxing in Japan

Achievements
Preceded by Greg Richardson	WBC Bantamweight champion September 19, 1991 – September 17, 1992	Succeeded by Victor Rabanales
Vacant Title last held by Victor Rabanales	WBC Bantamweight champion Interim title July 22, 1993 – December 4, 1994; Lost bid for full title	Vacant Title next held by Sirimongkol Singwancha
Preceded by Sirimongkol Singwancha	WBC Bantamweight champion November 22, 1997 – August 29, 1999	Succeeded by Veeraphol Sahaprom
