= Victor Rabanales =

Mexican boxer

Personal information
- Nickname: Lacandon
- Born: Victor Manuel Rabanales; December 23, 1962 (age 63) Ciudad Hidalgo, Chiapas, Mexico
- Height: 5 ft 4 1/2 in (164 cm)
- Weight: Bantamweight; Super bantamweight

Boxing career
- Reach: 65 in (165 cm)
- Stance: Orthodox

Boxing record
- Total fights: 73
- Wins: 49
- Win by KO: 26
- Losses: 21
- Draws: 3

Victor Manuel Rabanales (born December 23, 1962) is a Mexican former professional boxer. He is a former WBC bantamweight Champion. He was trained by Boxing Hall of Famer Ignacio Beristáin.

== Professional career ==
In August 1983, Rabanales won his pro debut by knocking out veteran Mario Asteaga in Mexico City.

=== WBC bantamweight title ===
His first shot at a WBC bantamweight title was against Greg Richardson, but he lost a disputed decision. In Inglewood, California he upset Yong-Hoon Lee to win the Interim WBC bantamweight title. On September 17, 1992 he won the WBC Bantamweight Championship by beating an undefeated Joichiro Tatsuyoshi in Japan. He would lose his title to Byun Jung-il in another very disputed decision in South Korea. He also had close decision losses to an undefeated Wayne McCullough and Sirimongkol Singwancha.

== Professional boxing record ==
| 73 fights | 49 wins | 21 losses |
|---|---|---|
| By knockout | 26 | 5 |
| By decision | 23 | 14 |
| By disqualification | 0 | 2 |
| Draws | 3 | |

| No. | Result | Record | Opponent | Type | Round, time | Date | Location | Notes |
|---|---|---|---|---|---|---|---|---|
| 73 | Loss | 49–21–3 | (Mexico) Fernando Beltrán Jr. | UD | 10 (10) | 2003-11-21 | (Mexico) Culiacan | |
| 72 | Loss | 49–20–3 | (Mexico) Saul Briseno | TD | 8 (10) | 2003-07-17 | Salon La Maraka, Mexico City | For FECARBOX Super bantamweight title |
| 71 | Win | 49–19–3 | (Mexico) Jaime Ortiz | SD | 12 (12) | 2002-10-31 | Foro Las Americas, Mexico City | |
| 70 | Win | 48–19–3 | (Mexico) Diego Andrade | KO | 5 (12) | 2002-06-12 | Salon 21, Mexico City | |
| 69 | Loss | 47–19–3 | (Mexico) Heriberto Ruiz | PTS | 8 (8) | 2001-11-25 | (United States) Stateline Casino, West Wendover | |
| 68 | Win | 47–18–3 | (Mexico) Saul Briseno | MD | 12 (12) | 2001-10-30 | Mexico City | |
| 67 | Win | 46–18–3 | (Mexico) Hugo Romero | PTS | 12 (12) | 2001-04-12 | Mexico | |
| 66 | Loss | 45–18–3 | (Mexico) Carlos Contreras | TKO | 9 (?) | 2000-09-29 | (Mexico) Ciudad Juarez | For WBU World Super bantamweight title |
| 65 | Loss | 45–17–3 | (Mexico) Sergio Perez | TKO | 7 (10) | 2000-04-07 | (Mexico) Auditorio Fausto Gutierrez Moreno, Tijuana | |
| 64 | Win | 45–16–3 | (Mexico) Justo Almazan | UD | 10 (10) | 2000-03-11 | (Mexico) Ciudad Hidalgo | |
| 63 | Win | 44–16–3 | (Mexico) Jesus Almazan | TKO | 3 (?) | 1999-09-25 | (Mexico) Irapuato | |
| 62 | Loss | 43–16–3 | (Mexico) Genaro García | SD | 10 (10) | 1999-03-13 | Mexico City | |
| 61 | Draw | 43–15–3 | (Mexico) Justo Almazan | TD | 5 (?) | 1998-12-04 | (Mexico) San Luis Potosi | |
| 60 | Loss | 43–15–2 | (Thailand) Sirimongkol Singwancha | UD | 12 (12) | 1997-07-04 | (Thailand) Pattani | For WBC Bantamweight title |
| 59 | Win | 43–14–2 | (Mexico) Marius Heriberto Frias | MD | 10 (10) | 1997-02-14 | (United States) Fantasy Springs Resort Casino, Indio | |
| 58 | Win | 42–14–2 | (Mexico) Arturo Estrada | KO | 5 (10) | 1996-05-13 | (United States) Humble | |
| 57 | Win | 41–14–2 | (Mexico) Alejandro Sanabria | KO | 4 (10) | 1996-02-05 | (United States) Honda Center, Anaheim | |
| 56 | Win | 40–14–2 | (Mexico) Rafael Márquez | KO | 8 (?) | 1995-09-14 | (Mexico) Campeche | |
| 55 | Win | 39–14–2 | (Puerto Rico) Javier Cintron | TKO | 4 (?) | 1995-05-20 | (United States) Miami | |
| 54 | Win | 38–14–2 | (Philippines) Silverio Tan | KO | 7 (?) | 1994-11-14 | Japan | |
| 53 | Loss | 37–14–2 | (Ghana) Nana Konadu | UD | 10 (10) | 1994-10-07 | (Spain) Salón La Paloma, Barcelona | |
| 52 | Loss | 37–13–2 | (United Kingdom) Wayne McCullough | UD | 12 (12) | 1994-06-17 | (United States) Etess Arena, Atlantic City | For NABF Bantamweight title |
| 51 | Win | 37–12–2 | (Mexico) Juan Francisco Soto | UD | 10 (10) | 1993-11-15 | (United States) The Forum, Inglewood | |
| 50 | Loss | 36–12–2 | (Japan) Joichiro Tatsuyoshi | SD | 12 (12) | 1993-07-22 | (Japan) Prefectural Gymnasium, Osaka | For Interim WBC Bantamweight title |
| 49 | Loss | 36–11–2 | (South Korea) Byun Jung-il | UD | 12 (12) | 1993-03-28 | (South Korea) Hyundai Hotel, Gyeongju | Lost WBC Bantamweight title |
| 48 | Win | 36–10–2 | (Philippines) Dadoy Andujar | UD | 12 (12) | 1993-01-25 | (United States) The Forum, Inglewood | Retained WBC Bantamweight title |
| 47 | Win | 35–10–2 | (Japan) Joichiro Tatsuyoshi | TKO | 9 (12) | 1992-09-17 | (Japan) Osaka-jō Hall, Osaka | Won WBC Bantamweight title |
| 46 | Win | 34–10–2 | (South Korea) Jang Kyun Oh | UD | 12 (12) | 1992-07-27 | (United States) The Forum, Inglewood | Retained Interim WBC Bantamweight title |
| 45 | Win | 33–10–2 | (Argentina) Luis Alberto Ocampo | TKO | 4 (12) | 1992-05-16 | (Mexico) Plaza de Toros San Roque, Tuxtla Gutierrez | Retained Interim WBC Bantamweight title |
| 44 | Win | 32–10–2 | (South Korea) Yong Hoon Lee | TD | 9 (12) | 1992-03-30 | (United States) The Forum, Inglewood | Won Interim WBC Bantamweight title |
| 43 | Win | 31–10–2 | (Mexico) Gustavo Rodriguez | TKO | 6 (?) | 1992-02-16 | (Mexico) Tuxtla Gutierrez | |
| 42 | Win | 30–10–2 | (Mexico) Abraham Barrientos | UD | 10 (10) | 1992-01-12 | (Mexico) Tuxtla Gutierrez | |
| 41 | Win | 29–10–2 | (Mexico) Jose Valdez | UD | 12 (12) | 1991-11-30 | (Mexico) Tijuana | |
| 40 | Win | 28–10–2 | (Mexico) Luis Espinoza | TKO | 9 (?) | 1991-08-03 | (Mexico) Campeche | |
| 39 | Loss | 27–10–2 | (United States) Greg Richardson | SD | 12 (12) | 1991-05-20 | (United States) The Forum, Inglewood | For WBC Bantamweight title |
| 38 | Win | 27–9–2 | (Mexico) Javier Leon | TKO | 7 (10) | 1991-03-11 | (United States) The Forum, Inglewood | |
| 37 | Win | 26–9–2 | (Mexico) César Soto | UD | 10 (10) | 1990-11-19 | (United States) The Forum, Inglewood | |
| 36 | Win | 25–9–2 | (Chile) Cardenio Ulloa | TD | 7 (10) | 1990-08-06 | (United States) The Forum, Inglewood | |
| 35 | Win | 24–9–2 | (Mexico) Jose Luis Vegagil | KO | 10 (10) | 1990-05-07 | (United States) The Forum, Inglewood | |
| 34 | Win | 23–9–2 | (Mexico) Julio Pliego | UD | 10 (10) | 1990-02-03 | Mexico City | |
| 33 | Win | 22–9–2 | (Mexico) César Soto | SD | 10 (10) | 1989-10-15 | (Mexico) Plaza de Toros Alberto Balderas, Ciudad Lerdo | |
| 32 | Win | 21–9–2 | (Mexico) Tomas Valdez | KO | 9 (?) | 1989-06-16 | (Mexico) Navojoa | |
| 31 | Win | 20–9–2 | (Mexico) Jose Luis Vegagil | TKO | 9 (?) | 1989-04-15 | Arena Coliseo, Mexico City | |
| 30 | Draw | 19–9–2 | (Mexico) Guadalupe Rubio | PTS | 10 (10) | 1989-01-27 | (Mexico) Mazatlan | |
| 29 | Win | 19–9–1 | (Mexico) Efrain Pintor | TD | 6 (?) | 1988-11-19 | (Mexico) Arena Naucalpan, Naucalpan de Juárez | |
| 28 | Win | 18–9–1 | (Mexico) Roberto Rios | TKO | 4 (?) | 1988-10-22 | (Mexico) Arena Naucalpan, Naucalpan de Juárez | |
| 27 | Win | 17–9–1 | (Mexico) Fernando Varguez | MD | 10 (10) | 1988-09-10 | Arena Coliseo, Mexico City | |
| 26 | Win | 16–9–1 | (Mexico) Armando Salazar | UD | 1O (1O) | 1988-06-18 | (Mexico) Arena Naucalpan, Naucalpan de Juárez | |
| 25 | Loss | 15–9–1 | (Mexico) Efrain Pintor | DQ | 4 (?) | 1988-05-21 | (Mexico) Arena Naucalpan, Naucalpan de Juárez | |
| 24 | Win | 15–8–1 | (Mexico) Abraham Barrientos | PTS | 10 (10) | 1988-03-18 | (Mexico) Tapachula | |
| 23 | Loss | 14–8–1 | (Mexico) Diego Avila | PTS | 10 (10) | 1988-01-23 | Mexico City | |
| 22 | Loss | 14–7–1 | (Venezuela) Santiago Caballero | DQ | 8 (10) | 1987-12-05 | Mexico City | |
| 21 | Loss | 14–6–1 | (Mexico) Diego Avila | SD | 10 (10) | 1987-10-31 | Mexico City | |
| 20 | Win | 14–5–1 | (Mexico) Armando Castro | TKO | 1 (?) | 1987-10-03 | Mexico City | |
| 19 | Win | 13–5–1 | (Mexico) Julio Blanco | PTS | 10 (10) | 1987-08-21 | (Mexico) Guadalajara | |
| 18 | Win | 12–5–1 | (Mexico) Javier Herrera | TKO | 5 (?) | 1987-07-18 | Mexico City | |
| 17 | Win | 11–5–1 | (Mexico) Manuel Ramos | TKO | 6 (?) | 1987-06-27 | Mexico City | |
| 16 | Win | 10–5–1 | (Mexico) Martin Lopez | PTS | 10 (10) | 1987-04-04 | Mexico City | |
| 15 | Win | 9–5–1 | (Mexico) Javier Esquivel | PTS | 10 (10) | 1987-02-21 | Mexico City | |
| 14 | Loss | 8–5–1 | (Mexico) Felipe Gutierrez | TKO | 5 (?) | 1986-04-01 | Mexico City | |
| 13 | Win | 8–4–1 | (Mexico) Edgar Garcia | TKO | 5 (?) | 1986-02-01 | Mexico City | |
| 12 | Win | 7–4–1 | (Mexico) Octavio Santos | TKO | 3 (?) | 1986-01-31 | (Mexico) Tapachula | |
| 11 | Win | 6–4–1 | (Mexico) Arturo Mendoza | TKO | 5 (?) | 1985-12-28 | Mexico City | |
| 10 | Loss | 5–4–1 | (Mexico) Arturo Mendoza | PTS | 8 (8) | 1985-11-13 | Mexico City | |
| 9 | Win | 5–3–1 | (Mexico) Victor Manuel Gomez | KO | 3 (?) | 1985-08-21 | Mexico City | |
| 8 | Draw | 4–3–1 | (Mexico) Saul Martinez | PTS | 6 (6) | 1985-08-02 | (Mexico) Arena Naucalpan, Naucalpan de Juárez | |
| 7 | Win | 4–3 | (Mexico) Jose Jaimes | PTS | 4 (4) | 1985-03-16 | Mexico City | |
| 6 | Win | 3–3 | (Mexico) Guillermo Alonso | KO | 1 (?) | 1985-02-02 | Arena Coliseo, Mexico City | |
| 5 | Win | 2–3 | (Mexico) Jose Jaimes | TKO | 2 (?) | 1984-12-22 | Mexico City | |
| 4 | Loss | 1–3 | (Mexico) Jose Jaimes | PTS | 4 (4) | 1984-11-10 | Mexico City | |
| 3 | Loss | 1–2 | (Mexico) Hector Garcia | TKO | 1 (?) | 1984-06-13 | Mexico City | |
| 2 | Loss | 1–1 | (Mexico) Oscar Ortiz | TKO | 3 (?) | 1983-09-14 | Arena Coliseo, Mexico City | |
| 1 | Win | 1–0 | (Mexico) Mario Asteaga | TKO | 1 (?) | 1983-08-13 | Mexico City | |

== See also ==
- List of Mexican boxing world champions
- List of bantamweight boxing champions

Achievements
| Vacant Title last held by Alberto Dávila | WBC Bantamweight champion Interim title March 30 – September 17, 1992; Won full title | Vacant Title next held by Joichiro Tatsuyoshi |
| Preceded by Joichiro Tatsuyoshi | WBC Bantamweight champion September 17, 1992 – March 28, 1993 | Succeeded by Byun Jung-il |
