= Greg Richardson =

American boxer

Personal information
- Nickname: The Flea
- Born: Greg Richardson; February 7, 1958 (age 68) Youngstown, Ohio, US
- Height: 5 ft 8 in (173 cm)
- Weight: Super flyweight; Bantamweight; Super bantamweight

Boxing career
- Reach: 69 in (175 cm)
- Stance: Orthodox

Boxing record
- Total fights: 40
- Wins: 31
- Win by KO: 4
- Losses: 8
- Draws: 1

Greg Richardson (born February 7, 1958) is a former professional boxer who was the WBC Bantamweight Champion between February 25, 1991, and September 19, 1991.

== Personal life ==
Greg Richardson was born February 7, 1958, in Youngstown, Ohio. Richardson is the uncle of former Florida Gators cornerback Keiwan Ratliff and former professional boxer Durrell Richardson

After retiring from boxing in 1996, Richardson transitioned to training amateur fighters in Youngstown, Ohio, focusing on youth mentorship programs at local gyms.

== Amateur career ==
He began boxing in the late 1960s. In 1974, he was the National AAU and National Golden Gloves flyweight champion

== Professional career ==
Known as "The Flea", Richardson debuted in professional boxing in 1982. In February 1991, he defeated Raúl Pérez and won the WBC world bantamweight title. Trained by Earl Charity, Richardson's quick reflexes were credited with earning him a 12-round unanimous decision over Perez, who held the title for almost 28 months. He defended the title against Victor Rabanales, before losing the belt to Joichiro Tatsuyoshi in 1991. In 1992 he moved down in weight to take on WBC super flyweight title holder Moon Sung-kil, but lost a majority decision. He retired in 1996.

During his career, Richardson also held the NABF Bantamweight Title, as well as the USBA Bantamweight and Super Bantamweight Titles.

== Professional boxing record ==
40 fights	31 wins	8 losses
By knockout	4	4
By decision	27	4
Draws	1	

No.	Result	Record	Opponent	Type	Round, time	Date	Location	Notes
40	Loss	31–8–1	(Mexico) Juan Carlos Ramírez	TKO	6 (12)	1996-07-05	(Mexico) Ciudad Juarez	For vacant WBB Bantamweight title
39	Loss	31–7–1	(Romania) Petrica Janos Paraschiv	PTS	12 (12)	1995-06-10	(Romania) Braila	
38	Win	31–6–1	(Philippines) Edel Geronimo	UD	12 (12)	1995-02-28	(United States) Sheraton Waikiki Hotel, Honolulu	Won WBA Penta-Continental Bantamweight title
37	Win	30–6–1	(Mexico) Armando Castro	PTS	12 (12)	1994-07-22	(United States) Youngstown	
36	Draw	29–6–1	(Mexico) Miguel Espinoza	PTS	8 (8)	1993-07-12	(United States) The Forum, Inglewood, California	
35	Loss	29–6	(South Korea) Moon Sung-kil	MD	12 (12)	1992-10-31	(South Korea) Olympic Fencing Gymnasium, Seoul	For WBC Super flyweight title
34	Loss	29–5	(Japan) Joichiro Tatsuyoshi	RTD	10 (12)	1991-09-19	(Japan) City Gymnasium, Moriguchi	Lost WBC Bantamweight title
33	Win	29–4	(Mexico) Victor Rabanales	SD	12 (12)	1991-05-20	(United States) The Forum, Inglewood, California	Retained WBC Bantamweight title
32	Win	28–4	(Mexico) Raúl Pérez	UD	12 (12)	1991-02-25	(United States) The Forum, Inglewood, California	Won WBC Bantamweight title
31	Win	27–4	(United States) Eddie Rangel	UD	12 (12)	1990-11-12	(United States) Lakefront Arena, New Orleans	Won USBA Bantamweight title
30	Win	26–4	(Indonesia) Ellyas Pical	MD	10 (10)	1990-03-12	(Indonesia) Gelora Bung Karno Stadium, Jakarta	
29	Win	25–4	(United States) Gaby Canizales	UD	10 (10)	1989-07-17	(United States) Trump Plaza Hotel and Casino, Atlantic City	
28	Win	24–4	(United States) Sonny Long	UD	10 (10)	1989-05-30	(United States) Mahoning Country Club, Girard, Ohio	
27	Win	23–4	(United States) James Tolliver	UD	10 (10)	1988-11-15	(United States) Mahoning Country Club, Girard, Ohio	
26	Loss	22–4	(United States) Jesse Benavides	SD	12 (12)	1987-11-20	(United States) Sands Casino Hotel, Atlantic City	For vacant USBA Super bantamweight title
25	Loss	22–3	(Australia) Jeff Fenech	KO	5 (12)	1987-07-10	(Australia) Entertainment Centre, Sydney	For WBC Super bantamweight title
24	Win	22–2	(United States) Darryl Thigpen	UD	12 (12)	1987-06-05	(United States) The Forum, Inglewood, California	Retained USBA Super bantamweight title
23	Win	21–2	(United States) Robert Shannon	MD	12 (12)	1986-11-26	(United States) Bicentennial Pavilion, Tacoma	Retained USBA Super bantamweight title
22	Win	20–2	(United States) Ron Cisneros	PTS	10 (10)	1986-08-14	(United States) Edmonds Community College, Lynnwood, Washington	
21	Win	19–2	(United States) James Tolliver	UD	12 (12)	1985-10-01	(United States) Atlantic City	Retained USBA Super bantamweight title
20	Win	18–2	(United States) Oscar Muniz	UD	12 (12)	1985-06-04	(United States) Tropicana Hotel & Casino, Atlantic City	Won vacant USBA Super bantamweight title
19	Win	17–2	(United States) James Manning	SD	12 (12)	1985-01-25	(United States) Marriott Hotel, Portland, Oregon	Retained NABF Bantamweight title
18	Win	16–2	(Panama) Alfonso López	UD	10 (10)	1984-11-13	(United States) Tropicana Hotel & Casino, Atlantic City	
17	Win	15–2	(United States) Harold Petty	UD	12 (12)	1984-09-20	(United States) Showboat Hotel & Casino, Las Vegas	Won NABF Bantamweight title
16	Win	14–2	(United States) Roy Muniz	TKO	8 (8)	1984-07-31	(United States) Tropicana Hotel & Casino, Atlantic City	
15	Win	13–2	(Colombia) Edgar Acevedo	PTS	10 (10)	1984-05-26	(United States) Miami Beach	
14	Win	12–2	(Philippines) Romy Navarrete	UD	10 (10)	1984-04-17	(United States) Blaisdell Center Arena, Honolulu	
13	Win	11–2	(United States) John Norman	KO	4 (?)	1984-04-03	(United States) Tropicana Hotel & Casino, Atlantic City	
12	Win	10–2	(Puerto Rico) Diego Rosario	MD	8 (8)	1984-01-17	(United States) Tropicana Hotel & Casino, Atlantic City	
11	Win	9–2	(United States) Sonny Long	UD	8 (8)	1983-11-15	(United States) Tropicana Hotel & Casino, Atlantic City	
10	Win	8–2	(Puerto Rico) Felix Marquez	UD	8 (8)	1983-09-27	(United States) Tropicana Hotel & Casino, Atlantic City	
9	Win	7–2	(Mexico) Baby Kid Chocolate	PTS	8 (8)	1983-07-27	(United States) Philadelphia	
8	Win	6–2	(United States) Francis Childs	PTS	8 (8)	1983-04-24	(United States) Playboy Hotel & Casino, Atlantic City	
7	Loss	5–2	(United States) Francis Childs	PTS	6 (6)	1982-10-14	(United States) McDonald Labor Lyceum, Conshohocken, Pennsylvania	
6	Win	5–1	(United States) James Tolliver	PTS	4 (4)	1982-09-29	(United States) Tiffany Manor, Brookfield, Ohio	
5	Win	4–1	(United States) Clarence Miller	KO	2 (?)	1982-08-23	(United States) Claridge Hotel & Casino, Atlantic City	
4	Win	3–1	(United States) Simon Feaster	PTS	4 (4)	1982-07-24	(United States) V.I.P. Club, Niles, Ohio	
3	Win	2–1	(United States) Brett Livingston	PTS	4 (4)	1982-05-08	(United States) Davison High School, Davison, Michigan	
2	Loss	1–1	(United States) Henry Lee	KO	1 (?)	1982-03-17	(United States) V.I.P. Club, Niles, Ohio	
1	Win	1–0	(United States) Al Dunlap	TKO	1 (?)	1982-02-22	(United States) V.I.P. Club, Niles, Ohio	Professional debut

== See also ==
- List of bantamweight boxing champions

Sporting positions
Amateur boxing titles
Previous: Richard Rozelle	U.S. flyweight champion 1974	Next: Richard Rozelle
Previous: Miguel Ayala	Golden Gloves flyweight champion 1974	Next: Leo Randolph
World boxing titles
Preceded by Raúl Pérez	WBC Bantamweight champion February 25, 1991 – September 19, 1991	Succeeded by Joichiro Tatsuyoshi
