= Veeraphol Sahaprom vs. Joichiro Tatsuyoshi II =

Boxing match

Final Chapter
- Date: Sunday, August 29, 1999
- Venue: Osaka Dome, Osaka, Japan
- Title(s) on the line: WBC bantamweight title

Tale of the tape
| Boxer | (Thailand) Veeraphol Sahaprom | (Japan) Joichiro Tatsuyoshi |
| Nickname | "Payak na khruem" (The Stoic Tiger) | "Naniwa no Joe" (Joe of Naniwa) |
| Hometown | Nakhon Ratchasima, Thailand | Kurashiki, Okayama, Japan |
| Pre-fight record | 23–1–0 (17 KO) (Boxing) 165–29–2 (20 KO) (Muay Thai) | 23–5–1 (13 KO) |
| Age | 30 years, 9 months | 29 years, 3 months |
| Height | 162 cm (5 ft 4 in) | 165 cm (5 ft 5 in) |
| Style | Orthodox | Orthodox |
| Recognition | WBC; Bantamweight Champion; Former WBA Bantamweight Champion; Three-division Rajadamnern Stadium Champion | Former 2-time WBC Bantamweight Champion |

Result
- Veeraphol wins via 7th-round TKO

Veeraphol Sahaprom vs. Joichiro Tatsuyoshi (II), billed as Final Chapter, was a professional boxing match contested on August 29, 1999, for the WBC bantamweight championship.

== Background ==
After Japanese superstar Joichiro Tatsuyoshi lost his WBC bantamweight title to the Thai challenger, former WBA champion and skilled Muay Thai fighter Veeraphol Sahaprom, also known as Veeraphol Nakhonluang Promotion, on December 29, 1998, at Osaka Municipal Central Gymnasium, Veeraphol returned to the status of world champion.

He made his first successful title defense on May 21, 1999, in Saraburi, where he knocked out the Uruguayan contender Mauro Blanc in the fifth round. His second bout with Tatsuyoshi would be his second title defense.

As for Tatsuyoshi, after suffering a knockout loss to Veeraphol in the sixth round late the previous year, he did not take any non-title bouts. Instead, he returned directly to fight for the title once again against his old rival.

Shortly before the rematch, Tatsuyoshi's father, who had raised and trained him to become a boxer since childhood, passed away. The loss left him deeply saddened, but also inspired him to fight with renewed determination. He publicly declared that he would not bury his father's ashes in the cemetery until he regained the WBC bantamweight title.

== The fight ==
The fight took place at Osaka Dome, now known as Kyocera Dome Osaka, in front of a massive crowd, most of whom were Tatsuyoshi's supporters. His wife, mother, and children sat at ringside, holding a photo of his late father. Tatsuyoshi himself wore a robe with his father's image embroidered on the back in tribute. Notably, for this fight, his trunks, boots, and gloves were all metallic blue, instead of his usual white. Veeraphol also wore blue gloves.

Once the bout began, with Richard Steele as the referee, Tatsuyoshi struggled to mount any effective offense. He was repeatedly hit by Veeraphol's clean punches. When Veeraphol came close, Tatsuyoshi mostly clinched, held him down, or grabbed his neck to avoid further damage.

Although they saw their favorite boxer in trouble, the Japanese fans kept chanting Tatsuyoshi's name in support.

The fight ended in round seven when Veeraphol delivered a flurry of punches to Tatsuyoshi's face, all of which went unblocked. The final blow, a powerful right hook, landed cleanly on his jaw. Referee Richard Steele quickly stepped in to stop the contest and reached out to steady Tatsuyoshi, who looked like he was about to fall. Veeraphol also rushed forward to help, having glanced at Steele moments earlier as if asking him to stop the fight.

== Aftermath ==
After the match, Tatsuyoshi showed great sportsmanship by raising Veeraphol's hand to acknowledge his victory. The two talked briefly. "You are the superb champ," Tatsuyoshi said, poking Veeraphol's chest with his forefinger. In a touching moment, Tatsuyoshi lifted Veeraphol and carried him around the ring. Veeraphol returned the gesture by carrying Tatsuyoshi in return.

Even in defeat, the crowd continued chanting Tatsuyoshi's name until he disappeared into the locker room.

Speaking in a ringside interview, Veeraphol praised Tatsuyoshi, saying he was stronger and more powerful this time.

Years later, after Veeraphol retired, Tatsuyoshi continued his boxing career. In his later years, he traveled to Thailand and even visited Chaiyaphum, where Veeraphol's Thai restaurant was located. As soon as he got off the van, Tatsuyoshi shouted "Veeraphol!" in a strong Japanese accent. Since that unforgettable fight, the two have remained good friends.
