= Yasuei Yakushiji =

Japanese boxer

Personal information
- Nickname: none
- Nationality: Japanese
- Born: Yasuei Yakushiji; July 22, 1968 (age 58) Tsukumi, Ōita, Japan
- Weight: Bantamweight

Boxing career
- Stance: Orthodox

Boxing record
- Total fights: 28
- Wins: 24
- Win by KO: 16
- Losses: 3
- Draws: 1

Yasuei Yakushiji (薬師寺保栄, Yakushiji Yasuei; born July 22, 1968) is a former professional boxer who fought in the bantamweight division. He successfully defended the WBC bantamweight title four times during his career.

== Biography ==
Yakushiji began boxing under influence of his father, who was an amateur boxer. He advanced to the semi-finals in the 1986 Inter-high school tournament, and joined the Matsuda boxing gym in 1987, after graduating from high school. He made his professional debut in July of that year.

He made a poor showing early on, winning only 3 of the first 6 fights of his professional career. Even his own trainer doubted that he would win the Japanese title, let alone a world title at this point.

In 1989, he was arrested for speeding on a motorcycle with some of his high school friends, and received a 6-month suspension from the Japanese Boxing Commission. He had to travel to Singapore to continue his training during this period.

In June, 1990, he won a bout by 10-round KO, but his opponent died of injuries several days later. Yakushiji seriously contemplated retirement, but decided to continue his career. He traveled to Los Angeles, and met Japanese-American trainer Mack Kurihara, who greatly increased Yakushiji's skills in the ring. Yakushiji won the Japanese bantamweight title in June, 1991, and defended it once in December before returning it.

On December 23, 1993, Yakushiji got his first shot at the world title, against Jung-Il Byun of South Korea. Yakushiji was actually a substitute for Joichiro Tatsuyoshi, who had sustained a detached left retina, and had backed out of the title match. Yakushiji won by 12 round split decision, winning the WBC bantamweight title. He defended the title once by a 10-round KO win, and faced Byun again in July, 1994, winning again by 11-round TKO after putting Byun down to the canvas five times.

Joichiro Tatsuyoshi had recovered from his injury to win the WBC bantamweight interim title, and after much negotiating and squabbling between the two teams, it was decided that Yakushiji and Tatsuyoshi would face off in a unification match on December 4, 1994, in the Nagoya Rainbow Hall. This was the first ever unification match between two Japanese fighters, and Tatsuyoshi's immense popularity gave the fight much media hype.

Yakushiji was the more accomplished fighter, having defended the bantamweight title twice, and a better record, (22-2-1, as opposed to Tatsuyoshi, who was 10-1-1) but came into the fight as an underdog. Yakushiji landed many short, accurate punches, using his superior speed to counter Tatsuyoshi's wild combinations. Neither fighter went down in 12 rounds, and Yakushiji won by a close 2-0 decision. It was later revealed that Tatsuyoshi had broken his left hand in the 1st round of this fight.

Yakushiji defended his bantamweight title for the fourth time in April, 1995, but lost to Wayne McCullough by split decision to lose his title. He announced his retirement shortly afterwards. His final record was 24-3-1 (16KOs), and he ended his career at the age of 27, without suffering a single knockdown in his 28 professional fights.

== Post-retirement ==
Yakushiji currently works as an actor and boxing commentator. He has starred in several movies and plays, along with various appearances on television and radio. He is known to be an avid fan of pachinko, and frequently appears on pachinko related television shows. In April, 2007, he opened the Yakushiji Boxing Gym in his hometown, Nagoya.

== Professional boxing record ==
28 fights	24 wins	3 losses
By knockout	16	0
By decision	8	3
Draws	1	

No.	Result	Record	Opponent	Type	Round	Date	Age	Location	Notes
28	Loss	24–3–1	(United Kingdom) Wayne McCullough	SD	12	Jul 30, 1995	27 years, 8 days	Aichi Prefectural Gym, Nagoya, Aichi, Japan	Lost WBC bantamweight title
27	Win	24–2–1	(Mexico) Cuauhtemoc Gomez	MD	12	Apr 2, 1995	26 years, 254 days	Rainbow Hall, Nagoya, Aichi, Japan	Retained WBC bantamweight title
26	Win	23–2–1	(Japan) Joichiro Tatsuyoshi	MD	12	Dec 4, 1994	26 years, 135 days	Rainbow Hall, Nagoya, Aichi, Japan	Retained WBC bantamweight title
25	Win	22–2–1	(South Korea) Byun Jung-il	TKO	11 (12)	Jul 31, 1994	26 years, 9 days	Aichi Prefectural Gym, Nagoya, Aichi, Japan	Retained WBC bantamweight title
24	Win	21–2–1	(Mexico) Josefino Suarez	KO	10 (12)	Apr 16, 1994	25 years, 268 days	Inae Sports Center, Nagoya, Aichi, Japan	Retained WBC bantamweight title
23	Win	20–2–1	(South Korea) Byun Jung-il	SD	12	Dec 23, 1993	25 years, 154 days	Aichi Prefectural Gym, Nagoya, Aichi, Japan	Won WBC bantamweight title
22	Win	19–2–1	(Thailand) Suksawat Torboonlert	PTS	10	Jul 11, 1993	24 years, 354 days	Nagoya, Aichi, Japan	
21	Win	18–2–1	(Mexico) Francisco Peralta	KO	6 (10)	Feb 28, 1993	24 years, 221 days	Nagoya, Aichi, Japan	
20	Win	17–2–1	(Philippines) Ruben De La Cruz	KO	1 (10)	Nov 3, 1992	24 years, 104 days	Nagoya, Aichi, Japan	
19	Win	16–2–1	(South Korea) Jung Min Suh	KO	5 (?)	Jun 21, 1992	23 years, 335 days	Nagoya, Aichi, Japan	
18	Win	15–2–1	(Philippines) Ricarte Cainiela	UD	10	Mar 15, 1992	23 years, 237 days	Nagoya, Aichi, Japan	
17	Win	14–2–1	(Japan) Yukio Nakatani	KO	1 (10)	Dec 1, 1991	23 years, 132 days	Nagoya, Aichi, Japan	Retained Japanese bantamweight title
16	Win	13–2–1	(Philippines) Rey Paciones	PTS	10	Sep 23, 1991	23 years, 63 days	Nagoya, Aichi, Japan	
15	Win	12–2–1	(Japan) Keiichi Ozaki	TKO	9 (10)	Jun 30, 1991	22 years, 343 days	Nagoya, Aichi, Japan	Won Japanese bantamweight title
14	Win	11–2–1	(Japan) Speedy Kikuchi	KO	9 (10)	Feb 24, 1991	22 years, 217 days	Nagoya, Aichi, Japan	
13	Win	10–2–1	(Japan) Kazuma Saeki	KO	1 (10)	Oct 17, 1990	22 years, 87 days	Shiratori Century Plaza Hall, Nagoya, Aichi, Japan	
12	Win	9–2–1	(Japan) Jun Yonesaka	KO	10 (10)	Jun 14, 1990	21 years, 327 days	Nakajima Sports Center, Sapporo, Hokkaido, Japan	Yonesaka died of injuries sustained in this bout
11	Win	8–2–1	(Thailand) Somboonyod Singsamang	KO	9 (?)	Mar 4, 1990	21 years, 225 days	Tsuyuhashi Sports Centre, Nagoya, Aichi, Japan	
10	Win	7–2–1	(Thailand) Sakdisamuth Singsamang	KO	5 (?)	Nov 25, 1989	21 years, 126 days	City Gymnasium, Toyota, Aichi, Japan	
9	Win	6–2–1	(Philippines) John Matienza	KO	6 (?)	Aug 26, 1989	21 years, 35 days	Singapore	
8	Win	5–2–1	(Japan) Yoshihiro Ichiyanagi	KO	1 (?)	Jan 24, 1989	20 years, 186 days	Tsuyuhashi Sports Center, Nagoya, Aichi, Japan	
7	Win	4–2–1	(Japan) Kazuto Kurahachi	KO	2 (?)	Nov 21, 1988	20 years, 122 days	City Hall, Nagoya, Aichi, Japan	
6	Draw	3–2–1	(Japan) Phantom Ozawa	PTS	8	Sep 4, 1988	20 years, 44 days	Rainbow Hall, Nagoya, Aichi, Japan	
5	Win	3–2	(Japan) Jun Takada	PTS	6	Jun 26, 1988	19 years, 340 days	Welfare Arena, Himeji, Hyogo, Japan	
4	Loss	2–2	(Japan) Shigeru Okabe	SD	6	May 16, 1988	19 years, 299 days	Korakuen Hall, Tokyo, Japan	
3	Loss	2–1	(Japan) Mitsuo Kawashima	PTS	6	Nov 23, 1987	19 years, 124 days	Himeji, Hyogo, Japan	
2	Win	2–0	(Japan) Teruaki Sato	KO	2 (?)	Oct 27, 1987	19 years, 97 days	Tsuyuhashi Sports Center, Nagoya, Aichi, Japan	
1	Win	1–0	(Japan) Hiroyuki Murayama	PTS	4	Aug 10, 1987	19 years, 19 days	Nagoya, Aichi, Japan	

== See also ==
- List of WBC world champions
- List of bantamweight boxing champions
- Joichiro Tatsuyoshi
- List of Japanese boxing world champions
- Boxing in Japan

Achievements
Preceded by Jung-Il Byun	WBC Bantamweight Champion; December 23, 1993–July 30, 1995	Succeeded by Wayne McCullough
