= List of world featherweight boxing champions =

== Championship recognition ==
=== Public acclamation: 1884 to 1921 ===
Champions were recognized by wide public acclamation. A featherweight champion was a boxer who had a notable win over another notable boxer and then went without defeat. Retirements from the ring periodically led to a "true" champion going unrecognized, or for several being recognized by the public for periods of time. Typically, public interest in having a single, "true" champion resulted in claimants to the featherweight title being matched with one another; the winner of that bout was subsequently deemed the champion, with the claim (and title lineage) of the defeated boxer largely forgotten.

=== Sanctioning bodies: 1921 to present ===
The National Boxing Association (NBA) was formed in 1921 as the first organization aimed at regulating boxing on a national (and later global) level. The prominence of New York City as the epicenter of boxing would lead to a governmental entity, the powerful New York State Athletic Commission (NYSAC), joining the NBA in sanctioning bouts as "world championships." A third entity, with lesser public recognition inside the US, the European Boxing Union (EBU), would follow suit, with this triumvirate typically (but not always) recognizing the same boxers as world champions.

At its 1962 convention, the NBA's non-U.S. members exploited a membership rule and took control of the organization, rebranding it the World Boxing Association. The WBA was joined a year later by a combination of state and national boxing commissions (including the NYSAC and IBU) to form a separate sanctioning body, the World Boxing Council (WBC). Each organization would later have a spin-off competing sanctioning body emerge: the International Boxing Federation (IBF), which was formed by members of the United States Boxing Association in 1983; and the World Boxing Organization (WBO), which was formed in 1989. A fifth significant (but not as publicly accepted) body came in the form of the International Boxing Organization (IBO), in 1991. Today there are over a dozen sanctioning organizations, of varying degrees of public acceptance, sanctioning bouts as for a world championship and proclaiming their title winners "Champion of the World."

Reign began	Reign ended	Champion	Recognition
World
1889-03-31	1890-01-13	Ike Weir	World
The featherweight class was established in 1860 but did not achieve universal recognition until Weir won the title.
1890-01-13	1890-09-02	Torpedo Billy Murphy	World
1890-09-02	1892-vacated	Young Griffo	World
1892-06-27	1896-11-27	George Dixon	World
1896-11-27	1897-03-24	Frank Erne	World
1897-03-24	1897-10-24	George Dixon	World
1897-10-04	1898-09-26	Solly Smith	World
1898-09-26	1898-11-11	Dave Sullivan	World
1898-11-11	1900-01-09	George Dixon	World
1899-05-29	1899-10-10	Ben Jordan	British World Title
Jordan and Santry were recognized as champion in Britain. When Terry McGovern defeated Santry in 1900 the title was reunified.
1899-10-10	1900-02-01	Eddie Santry	British World Title
1900-01-09	1901-11-28	Terry McGovern	World
1901-11-28	1902-vacated	Young Corbett II	World
Corbett could not make weight and relinquished the title (although some sources say he continued to defend the title at a higher weight). Attell was recognized as the best man at the weight and thus was proclaimed champion.
1904-02-01	1912-02-22	Abe Attell	World
1912-02-22	1922-06-21-stripped	Johnny Kilbane	World (NYSAC)
1922-08-15	1923-05-stripped	Johnny Dundee	World (NYSAC)
1923-05	1923-06-02	Johnny Kilbane	World (NYSAC)
1923-06-02	1923-07-26	Eugène Criqui	World (NYSAC)
1923-07-26	1924-08-20-vacated	Johnny Dundee	World (NYSAC)
1925-01-02	1926-vacated	Louis Kid Kaplan	World (NYSAC)
1927-09-12	1928-02-10	Benny Bass	NBA (inaugural title)
1927-10-24	1928-09-28	Tony Canzoneri	NYSAC/World
1928-09-28	1929-09-23	Andre Routis	World
1929-09-23	1932-01-27-vacated	Christopher Battalino	World/NBA
Battalino was stripped of his NYSAC title on 8 January 1932, then of his NBA and The Ring titles on the 27th, both instances for missing weight in title bouts.
1932-05-26	1933-01-13	Tommy Paul	NBA
1932-10-13	1934-02-19-stripped	Kid Chocolate	NYSAC
1933-01-13	1936-05-11	Freddie Miller	NBA
1934-08-30	1936-05-19-stripped	Baby Arizmendi	NYSAC
1936-05-11	1937-10-29	Petey Sarron	NBA
1936-05-19	1937-08-10-stripped	Mike Belloise	NYSAC
1937-10-29	1938-09-12-vacated	Henry Armstrong	World
1938-10-17	1940-05-20	Joey Archibald	NYSAC/World/NYSAC
Archibald won the vacant NBA title on 29 October 1939 by defeating Leo Rodak, but was then stripped of this title on 29 March 1940.
1940-05-01	1941-07-01	Petey Scalzo	NBA
1940-05-20	1941-05-12	Harry Jeffra	NYSAC
1941-05-12	1941-09-11	Joey Archibald	NYSAC
1941-07-01	1941-11-18	Richie Lemos	NBA
1941-09-11	1942-11-20	Chalky Wright	NYSAC
1941-11-18	1943-01-18	Jackie Wilson	NBA
1942-11-20	1946-06-27	Willie Pep	NYSAC
1943-01-18	1943-08-16	Jackie Callura	NBA
1943-08-16	1944-03-10	Phil Terranova	NBA
1944-03-10	1946-06-07	Sal Bartolo	NBA
Bartolo lost a unification bout with NYSAC champion Willie Pep on 7 June 1946.
1946-06-07	1948-10-29	Willie Pep	World
1948-10-29	1949-02-11	Sandy Saddler	World
1949-02-11	1950-09-08	Willie Pep	World
1950-09-08	1957-01-21-vacated	Sandy Saddler	World/NYSAC
Saddler was stripped of his NBA title on 16 January 1957. A few days later, he retired.
1957-06-24	1959-03-18	Hogan Bassey	World
1959-03-18	1963-03-21	Davey Moore	World
1963-03-21	1964-09-26	Sugar Ramos	WBA/WBC
1964-09-26	1967-10-14-vacated	Vicente Saldivar	WBA/WBC
WBC
Title inaugurated
1963-03-21	1964-09-26	Sugar Ramos	WBC
1964-09-26	1967-10-retired	Vicente Saldivar	WBC
1968-01-23	1968-07-24	Howard Winstone	WBC
1968-07-24	1969-01-21	José Legrá	WBC
1969-01-21	1970-05-09	Johnny Famechon	WBC
1970-05-09	1970-12-11	Vicente Saldivar	WBC
1970-12-11	1972-05-19	Kuniaki Shibata	WBC
1972-05-19	1972-12-16-stripped	Clemente Sanchez	WBC
1972-12-16	1973-05-05	José Legrá	WBC
1973-05-05	1974-06-17-stripped	Eder Jofre	WBC
1974-09-07	1975-06-20	Bobby Chacon	WBC
1975-06-20	1975-09-20	Rubén Olivares	WBC
1975-09-20	1976-11-06	David Kotei	WBC
1976-11-06	1980-02-02	Danny Lopez	WBC
1980-02-02	1982-07-21-died	Salvador Sánchez	WBC
1982-09-15	1984-03-31	Juan LaPorte	WBC
1984-03-31	1984-12-08	Wilfredo Gómez	WBC
1984-12-08	1987-08-29-vacated	Azumah Nelson	WBC
1988-03-07	1989-04-08-vacated	Jeff Fenech	WBC
1990-06-02	1991-11-13	Marcos Villasana	WBC
1991-11-13	1993-04-28	Paul Hodkinson	WBC
1993-04-28	1993-12-04	Gregorio Vargas	WBC
1993-12-04	1995-01-07	Kevin Kelley	WBC
1995-01-07	1995-09-23	Alejandro Martín González	WBC
1995-09-23	1995-12-11	Manuel Medina	WBC
1995-12-11	1999-05-15	Luisito Espinosa	WBC
1999-05-15	1999-10-22	Cesar Soto	WBC
1999-10-22	2000-vacated	Naseem Hamed	WBC
2000-04-14	2001-02-17	Guty Espadas Jr	WBC
2001-02-17	2002-06-22-stripped*	Erik Morales	WBC
*Morales lost to Marco Antonio Barrera, who declined the title.
2002-11-16	2003-05-03-vacated	Erik Morales	WBC
2004-04-10	2006-01-29	In-Jin Chi	WBC
2006-01-29	2006-07-30	Takashi Koshimoto	WBC
2006-07-30	2006-12-17	Rudy Lopez	WBC
2006-12-17	2007-07-retired	In-Jin Chi	WBC
2007-07-21	2008-08-13-vacated	Jorge Linares	WBC
2008-08-13	2009-03-12	Óscar Larios	WBC
2009-03-12	2009-07-14	Takahiro Aoh	WBC
2009-07-14	2010-08-25-stripped	Elio Rojas	WBC
2010-11-26	2011-04-08	Hozumi Hasegawa	WBC
2011-04-08	2012-09-12	Jhonny González	WBC
2012-09-12	2013-05-04	Daniel Ponce de León	WBC
2013-05-04	2013-08-24	Abner Mares	WBC
2013-08-24	2015-03-28	Jhonny González	WBC
2015-03-28	2022-01-22	Gary Russell, Jr.	WBC
2022-01-22	2022-07-09	Mark Magsayo	WBC
2022-07-09	2024-10-18 (champion in recess)	Rey Vargas	WBC
2024-10-18	2025-02-01	Brandon Figueroa	WBC
2025-02-01	2025-12-12-vacated	Stephen Fulton	WBC
2026-01-31	Present	Bruce Carrington	WBC
WBA
Title inaugurated
1963-03-21	1964-09-26	(Mexico) Sugar Ramos	WBA
1964-09-26	1967-10-retired	(Mexico) Vicente Saldivar	WBA
1968-03-28	1968-09-27	(United States) Raul Rojas	WBA
1968-09-27	1971-09-02	(Japan) Shozo Saijo	WBA
1971-09-02	1972-08-19	(Venezuela) Antonio Gomez	WBA
1972-08-19	1974-02-16-retired	(Panama) Ernesto Marcel	WBA
1974-07-09	1974-11-23	(Mexico) Rubén Olivares	WBA
1974-11-23	1976-06-19-vacated	(Nicaragua) Alexis Argüello	WBA
1977-01-15	1977-12-17	(Panama) Rafael Ortega	WBA
1977-12-17	1978-04-15	(Spain) Cecilio Lastra	WBA
1978-04-15	1985-06-08	(Panama) Eusebio Pedroza	WBA
1985-06-08	1986-06-23	(Republic of Ireland) Barry McGuigan	WBA
1986-06-23	1987-03-06	(United States) Steve Cruz	WBA
1987-03-06	1991-03-30	(Venezuela) Antonio Esparragoza	WBA
1991-03-30	1993-12-04	(South Korea) Yong-Kyun Park	WBA
1993-12-04	1996-05-18	(Venezuela) Eloy Rojas	WBA
1996-05-18	1997-11-08-stripped	(Puerto Rico) Wilfredo Vazquez	WBA
1998-04-03	1998-07-10-stripped	(United States) Freddie Norwood	WBA
1998-10-03	1999-05-29	(Venezuela) Antonio Cermeno	WBA
1999-05-29	2000-09-09	(United States) Freddie Norwood	WBA
2000-09-09	2003-11-01	(United States) Derrick Gainer	WBA
2003-11-01	2005-stripped	(Mexico) Juan Manuel Márquez	WBA Super Champion
2003-11-01	2013-12-06	(Indonesia) Yohannes Chris John	WBA Super Champion
2009-07-23	2011-06-11-stripped	(Cuba) Yuriorkis Gamboa	WBA Unified Champion
2010-12-04	2011-10-14	(Argentina) Jonathan Victor Barros	WBA Regular Champion
2011-10-14	2012-08-07-vacated	(Panama) Celestino Caballero	WBA Regular Champion
2012-12-08	2015-06-12-stripped	(Jamaica) Nicholas Walters	WBA Super Champion
2013-12-06	2014-05-31	(South Africa) Simpiwe Vetyeka	WBA Super Champion
2014-05-31	2014-10-18	(Philippines) Nonito Donaire	WBA Super Champion
2015-02-21	2016-12-10	(Argentina) Jesus Cuellar	WBA Regular Champion
2015-08-29	2016-07-30	(Mexico) Leo Santa Cruz	WBA Super Champion
2016-07-30	2017-01-28	(Republic of Ireland) Carl Frampton	WBA Super Champion
2016-12-10	2018-06-09-vacated	(Mexico) Abner Mares	WBA Regular Champion
2017-01-28	2022-12-12-vacated	(Mexico) Leo Santa Cruz	WBA Super Champion
2019-01-26	2021-07-21	(China) Xu Can	WBA Regular Champion
2021-07-21	2023-02-18	(United Kingdom) Leigh Wood	WBA Regular Champion/WBA
2023-02-18	2023-05-26	(Mexico) Mauricio Lara	WBA
2023-05-26	2023-10-17-vacated	(United Kingdom) Leigh Wood	WBA
2024-03-02	2024-06-01	(United States) Raymond Ford	WBA
2024-06-01	2026-02-07	(United Kingdom) Nick Ball	WBA
2026-02-07	Present	(United States) Brandon Figueroa	WBA
IBF
Title inaugurated
1984-03-04	1985-11-29	(South Korea) Min-Keun Oh	IBF
1985-11-29	1986-08-30	(South Korea) Ki-Young Chung	IBF
1986-08-30	1988-01-23	(Puerto Rico) Antonio Rivera	IBF
1988-01-23	1988-08-04	(United States) Calvin Grove	IBF
1988-08-04	1990-07-08-vacated	(Mexico) Jorge Páez	IBF
1991-06-03	1991-08-12	(United States) Troy Dorsey	IBF
1991-08-12	1993-02-26	(Mexico) Manuel Medina	IBF
1993-02-26	1997-02-08	(United States) Tom Douglas Johnson	IBF
1997-02-08	1997-07-19-vacated	(United Kingdom) Naseem Hamed	IBF
1997-12-13	1998-04-24	(Mexico) Hector Lizarraga	IBF
1998-04-24	1999-11-13	(Mexico) Manuel Medina	IBF
1999-11-13	2000-12-16	(United Kingdom) Paul Ingle	IBF
2000-12-16	2001-04-06	(South Africa) Mbulelo Botile	IBF
2001-04-06	2001-11-16	(United States) Frank Toledo	IBF
2001-11-16	2002-04-27	(Mexico) Manuel Medina	IBF
2002-04-27	2002-11-vacated	(United States) Johnny Tapia	IBF
2003-02-01	2005-05-07-stripped	(Mexico) Juan Manuel Márquez	IBF
2006-01-20	2006-05-13	(Brazil) Valdemir Pereira	IBF
2006-05-13	2006-09-02	(United States) Eric Aiken	IBF
2006-09-02	2006-11-04	(United States) Robert Guerrero	IBF
2006-11-04	2006-11-10-stripped	(Mexico) Orlando Salido	IBF
2007-02-23	2008-06-23-vacated	(United States) Robert Guerrero	IBF
2008-10-23	2010-05-15	(Mexico) Cristobal Cruz	IBF
2010-05-15	2010-09-11-stripped	(Mexico) Orlando Salido	IBF
2010-09-11	2011-03-26-stripped	(Cuba) Yuriorkis Gamboa	IBF
2011-07-29	2013-03-01	(Australia) Billy Dib	IBF
2013-03-01	2015-05-30	(Russia) Evgeny Gradovich	IBF
2015-05-30	2018-05-19-stripped	(United Kingdom) Lee Selby	IBF
2018-05-19	2021-01-21-vacated	(United Kingdom) Josh Warrington	IBF
2021-08-07	2021-11-13	(United Kingdom) Kid Galahad	IBF
2021-11-13	2022-03-26	(Spain) Kiko Martinez	IBF
2022-03-26	2022-12-10	(United Kingdom) Josh Warrington	IBF
2022-12-10	2024-08-10	(Mexico) Luis Alberto Lopez	IBF
2024-08-10	Present	(United States) Angelo Leo	IBF
WBO
Title inaugurated
1989-01-28	1989-11-11	(Italy) Maurizio Stecca	WBO
1989-11-11	1990-04-07	(United States) Louie Espinoza	WBO
1990-04-07	1990-07-08-vacated	(Mexico) Jorge Páez	WBO
1991-01-26	1992-05-16	(Italy) Maurizio Stecca	WBO
1992-05-16	1992-09-26	(United Kingdom) Colin McMillan	WBO
1992-09-26	1993-01-retired	(Colombia) Rubén Darío Palacio	WBO
1993-04-17	1995-09-30	(United Kingdom) Steve Robinson	WBO
1995-09-30	2000-09-20-vacated	(United Kingdom) Naseem Hamed	WBO
2001-01-27	2001-06-16	(Hungary) Istvan Kovacs	WBO
2001-06-16	2002-10-19	(Argentina) Julio Pablo Chacón	WBO
2002-10-19	2003-07-23	(United Kingdom) Scott Harrison	WBO
2003-07-23	2003-11-29	(Mexico) Manuel Medina	WBO
2003-11-29	2006-06-23-vacated	(United Kingdom) Scott Harrison	WBO
2006-12-06	2007-04-01-vacated	(Mexico) Juan Manuel Márquez	WBO
2007-07-14	2010-01-23	(United States) Steven Luevano	WBO
2010-01-23	2011-04-16	(Puerto Rico) Juan Manuel Lopez	WBO
2011-04-16	2013-01-19	(Mexico) Orlando Salido	WBO
2013-01-19	2013-06-14-stripped	(United States) Mikey García	WBO
2013-10-12	2014-02-28-stripped	(Mexico) Orlando Salido	WBO
2014-06-21	2015-11-7-vacated	(Ukraine) Vasyl Lomachenko	WBO
2016-07-23	2019-08-02-vacated	(Mexico) Óscar Valdez	WBO
2019-10-26	2020-07-09-vacated	(United States) Shakur Stevenson	WBO
2020-10-09	2023-02-10-vacated	(Mexico) Emanuel Navarrete	WBO
2023-04-01	2023-12-09	(Cuba) Robeisy Ramírez	WBO
2023-12-09	Present	(Mexico) Rafael Espinoza	WBO

== See also ==
- List of current boxing champions
- List of current female world boxing champions
- List of undisputed boxing champions
- List of WBA world champions
- List of WBC world champions
- List of IBF world champions
- List of WBO world champions
- List of The Ring world champions
- List of NYSAC world champions
- List of British world boxing champions
