= César Soto =

Mexican boxer

César Soto Esquivel
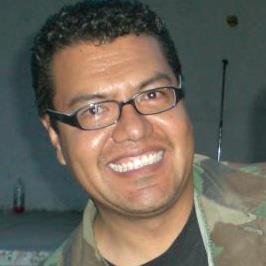
- 2011 in Valle Verde Ixtapaluca

Personal information
- Nickname: La Cobrita
- Born: César Soto Esquivel; September 17, 1971 (age 54) Lerdo, Durango, Mexico
- Height: 5 ft 7 in (171 cm)
- Weight: Bantamweight; Super-bantamweight; Featherweight; Super-featherweight

Boxing career
- Reach: 68 in (174 cm)
- Stance: Orthodox

Boxing record
- Total fights: 90
- Wins: 63
- Win by KO: 43
- Losses: 24
- Draws: 3

César Soto Esquivel (born September 17, 1971) is a Mexican retired professional boxer and is a former WBC featherweight champion.

== Professional career ==
Soto got his first world title shot in September 1991 against WBO bantamweight title holder Duke McKenzie in London, losing a unanimous decision.

In July 1993, César knocked out future lightweight champion, José Luis Castillo in two one-sided rounds, becoming the first man to defeat him.

Soto's second title shot was against WBC featherweight title holder Luisito Espinosa in July 1996, which was another unanimous decision loss for Soto.

In May 1999, Soto got another title shot against Espinosa at the Equestrian Center, El Paso, Texas, this time winning a controversial unanimous decision.

Soto lost the WBC title in his first defense in a unification bout with Lineal/WBO champion Naseem Hamed via a unanimous decision at the Joe Louis Arena, Detroit, Michigan in October 1999.

Soto continued his career despite losing more than he won, until finally retiring in 2011 with a record of 63-24-3 with 43 KOs.

== Professional boxing record ==
90 fights	63 wins	24 losses
By knockout	43	2
By decision	19	22
By disqualification	1	0
Draws	3	

No.	Result	Record	Opponent	Type	Round, time	Date	Location	Notes
90	Loss	63–24–3	Héctor Javier Márquez	UD	12	25 Jun 2011	Gimnasio Carlos Zárate, Cuautla, Mexico	
89	Loss	63–23–3	Gamaliel Díaz	UD	12	9 Apr 2011	Coliseum Don King, Texcoco, Mexico	
88	Loss	63–22–3	José López	UD	12	22 Jan 2011	Auditorio Municipal, Torreón, Mexico	
87	Loss	63–21–3	Eduardo Escobedo	UD	10	23 Oct 2010	Gimnasio San Damián, San Martín Texmelucan, Mexico	
86	Win	63–20–3	Jesús González	KO	3 (10)	21 Aug 2010	The Forum, Irapuato, Mexico	
85	Loss	62–20–3	Sergio Rivera	MD	12	12 Jun 2010	Centro de Usos Múltiples, Huatabampo, Mexico	
84	Win	62–19–3	Daniel Lomelí	TD	6 (12)	1 May 2010	Poliforo Juan Gabriel, Ciudad Juárez, Mexico	Won vacant WBC FECARBOX super featherweight title; Unanimous TD: Lomelí suffers a cut in the right eyebrow & eyelid from an accidental headbutt
83	Win	61–19–3	Silvestre Márquez	KO	1 (10), 2:52	6 Feb 2010	Arena, Chihuahua, Mexico	
82	Loss	60–19–3	Ammeth Díaz	UD	9	21 Jan 2010	Centro de Convenciones Atlapa, Panama City, Panama	For vacant WBA Fedebol lightweight title
81	Win	60–18–3	Ángel Reyna	TKO	6 (10), 1:17	17 Oct 2009	Gimnasio Municipal "José Neri Santos", Ciudad Juárez, Mexico	
80	Win	59–18–3	Alejandro Barrera	SD	10	30 May 2008	Poliforo Juan Gabriel, Ciudad Juárez, Mexico	
79	Win	58–18–3	Héctor Javier Márquez	SD	10	31 Aug 2007	Poliforo Juan Gabriel, Ciudad Juárez, Mexico	
78	Win	57–18–3	José Antonio Izquierdo	UD	10	27 Apr 2007	Poliforo Juan Gabriel, Ciudad Juárez, Mexico	
77	Loss	56–18–3	Miguel Román	UD	10	8 Dec 2006	Poliforo Juan Gabriel, Ciudad Juárez, Mexico	
76	Loss	56–17–3	Miguel Román	SD	10	4 Aug 2006	Poliforo Juan Gabriel, Ciudad Juárez, Mexico	
75	Win	56–16–3	Óscar Olivas	SD	10	19 May 2006	Poliforo Juan Gabriel, Ciudad Juárez, Mexico	
74	Win	55–16–3	Adrian Valdez	MD	10	14 Oct 2005	Poliforo Juan Gabriel, Ciudad Juárez, Mexico	
73	Loss	54–16–3	Francisco Javier Castro	SD	10	5 Aug 2005	Ciudad Juárez, Chihuahua, Mexico	
72	Loss	54–15–3	Orlando Salido	PTS	10	6 May 2005	Ciudad Obregón, Sonora, Mexico	
71	Loss	54–14–3	Adrian Valdez	TKO	1 (10), 2:08	22 Oct 2004	Poliforo Juan Gabriel, Ciudad Juárez, Mexico	
70	Loss	54–13–3	Juan Carlos Ramírez	SD	10	27 Feb 2004	Poliforo Juan Gabriel, Ciudad Juárez, Mexico	
69	Loss	54–12–3	Juan Carlos Ramírez	MD	10	1 Nov 2002	Poliforo Juan Gabriel, Ciudad Juárez, Mexico	
68	Loss	54–11–3	José Quintana	SD	10	11 May 2002	Coliseo Roberto Clemente, San Juan, Puerto Rico	
67	Loss	54–10–3	Johnny Tapia	KO	3 (10), 2:47	30 Jun 2001	Mandalay Bay Resort & Casino, Paradise, Nevada, U.S.	
66	Draw	54–9–3	Edgar Bárcenas	PTS	12 (10)	31 Mar 2001	Poliforo Juan Gabriel, Ciudad Juárez, Mexico	
65	Loss	54–9–2	Óscar Larios	UD	12	24 Jun 2000	Peppermill Hotel & Casino, Reno, Nevada, U.S.	
64	Loss	54–8–2	Naseem Hamed	UD	12	22 Oct 1999	Joe Louis Arena, Detroit, Michigan, U.S.	Lost WBC featherweight title; For WBO featherweight title
63	Win	54–7–2	Luisito Espinosa	UD	12	15 May 1999	Equestrian Center, El Paso, Texas, U.S.	Won WBC featherweight title
62	Win	53–7–2	Carlos Rios	UD	10	12 Sep 1998	Plaza de Toros, Tijuana, Mexico	
61	Win	52–7–2	Juan Polo Pérez	TKO	2 (10), 2:14	13 Jun 1998	Sun Bowl, El Paso, Texas, U.S.	
60	Win	51–7–2	José Ayala	UD	10	16 May 1998	Fantasy Springs Casino, Indio, California, U.S.	
59	Win	50–7–2	Sean Fletcher	KO	6 (10), 2:43	21 Nov 1997	Station Casino, Kansas City, Missouri, U.S.	
58	Win	49–7–2	Jorge Monzón	TKO	2 (10), 2:19	6 Sep 1997	County Coliseum, El Paso, Texas, U.S.	
57	Win	48–7–2	Enrique Beltrán	PTS	10	15 Aug 1997	Cemtro De Espectáculos Corona, Ciudad Juárez, Mexico	
56	Win	47–7–2	Agapito Sánchez	TKO	2 (10), 1:24	6 Jun 1997	Aladdin Hotel & Casino, Paradise, Nevada, U.S.	
55	Win	46–7–2	Elias Quiróz	TKO	2 (10), 2:24	12 Apr 1997	Tropicana Hotel & Caisno, Paradise, Nevada, U.S.	
54	Win	45–7–2	Barrington Francis	KO	1 (10)	1 Feb 1997	Swiss Park, Chula Vista, California, U.S.	
53	Win	44–7–2	Aaron Zàrate	PTS	10	6 Dec 1996	Ciudad Juárez, Chihuahua, Mexico	
52	Loss	43–7–2	Luisito Espinosa	UD	12	6 Jul 1996	Luneta Park, Manila, Philippines	For WBC featherweight title
51	Win	43–6–2	Lazaro Padilla	KO	2 (?)	1 Mar 1996	Fantasy Springs Casino, Indio, California, U.S.	
50	Win	42–6–2	Antonio Hernández	TKO	2 (10), 2:48	13 Oct 1995	Fantasy Springs Casino, Indio, California, U.S.	
49	Win	41–6–2	José Luis Madrid	TKO	6 (?)	29 Jul 1995	Freeman Coliseum, San Antonio, Texas, U.S.	
48	Win	40–6–2	Raúl Martínez Mora	PTS	10	12 May 1995	Ciudad Juárez, Chihuahua, Mexico	
47	Loss	39–6–2	Alejandro González	SD	12	6 Aug 1994	Plaza de Toros, Ciudad Juárez, Mexico	
46	Win	39–5–2	Raúl Gutiérrez	KO	4 (12)	3 Jun 1994	Ciudad Juárez, Chihuahua, Mexico	Retained Mexican featherweight title
45	Win	38–5–2	Louie Espinoza	PTS	12	25 Mar 1994	Ciudad Juárez, Chihuahua, Mexico	Won ianugural WBO-NABO featherweight title
44	Win	37–5–2	Raúl Martínez Mora	TKO	1 (12)	15 Oct 1993	Ciudad Juárez, Chihuahua, Mexico	Retained Mexican featherweight title
43	Win	36–5–2	José Luis Castillo	TKO	2 (12)	9 Jul 1993	Ciudad Juárez, Chihuahua, Mexico	Won vacant Mexican featherweight title
42	Win	35–5–2	Luis Alfonso Lizárraga	TKO	2 (?)	14 May 1993	Ciudad Juárez, Chihuahua, Mexico	Retained Mexican super bantamweight title
41	Win	34–5–2	Miguel Tepanacatl	KO	1 (12)	5 Mar 1993	Ciudad Juárez, Chihuahua, Mexico	Retained Mexican super bantamweight title
40	Win	33–5–2	Otilio Gallegos	TKO	2 (12), 2:50	27 Nov 1992	Ciudad Juárez, Chihuahua, Mexico	Won Mexican super bantamweight title
39	Win	32–5–2	Ray Minus	TKO	7 (12), 0:57	23 Oct 1992	County Coliseum, El Paso, Texas, U.S.	Won vacant WBC Continental Americas super bantamweight title
38	Win	31–5–2	Manuel De Jesús	TKO	3 (?)	15 Aug 1992	Mexico City, Distrito Federal, Mexico	
37	Win	30–5–2	Héctor Ulises Chong	TKO	2 (10)	26 Jun 1992	Ciudad Juárez, Chihuahua, Mexico	
36	Win	29–5–2	Raúl Martínez Mora	PTS	10	22 May 1992	Ciudad Juárez, Chihuahua, Mexico	
35	Win	28–5–2	Ramón Arreola	KO	1 (?)	3 Apr 1992	Ciudad Juárez, Chihuahua, Mexico	
34	Win	27–5–2	José Valdez	PTS	10	6 Mar 1992	Ciudad Juárez, Chihuahua, Mexico	
33	Win	26–5–2	Pedro Rábago	KO	6 (?)	13 Dec 1991	Delicias, Chihuahua, Mexico	
32	Loss	25–5–2	Duke McKenzie	UD	12	12 Sep 1991	Latchmere Leisure Centre, London, England	For WBO bantamweight title
31	Win	25–4–2	Guadalupe Rubio	TKO	2 (?)	31 May 1991	Ciudad Juárez, Chihuahua, Mexico	
30	Loss	24–4–2	Victor Rabanales	UD	10	19 Nov 1990	Great Western Forum, Inglewood, California, U.S.	
29	Win	24–3–2	Mike Phelps	PTS	5	22 Oct 1990	Great Western Forum, Inglewood, California, U.S.	
28	Draw	23–3–2	Mike Phelps	SD	10	22 Sep 1990	Great Western Forum, Inglewood, California, U.S.	
27	Win	23–3–1	Willy Salazar	UD	10	28 Jul 1990	Ciudad Juárez, Chihuahua, Mexico	
26	Win	22–3–1	Armando Castro	UD	10	18 May 1990	Ciudad Juárez, Chihuahua, Mexico	
25	Loss	21–3–1	Victor Rabanales	SD	10	15 Oct 1989	Plaza de Toros Alberto Balderas, Ciudad Lerdo, Mexico	
24	Win	21–2–1	Artemio Ruíz	UD	10	30 Jun 1989	Plaza de Toros, Torreón, Mexico	
23	Loss	20–2–1	Javier Díaz	PTS	10	1 Jan 1989	Piedras Negras, Coahuila, Mexico	
22	Win	20–1–1	Ricardo Mijares	KO	1 (?)	18 Nov 1988	Ciudsd Juárez, Chihuahua, Mexico	
21	Win	19–1–1	Armando Velasco	DQ	4 (?)	29 Apr 1988	Ciudad Juárez, Chihuahua, Mexico	
20	Win	18–1–1	Antonio Flores	KO	6 (?)	1 Mar 1988	Ciudad Juárez, Chihuahua, Mexico	
19	Win	17–1–1	Mario Lozano	KO	1 (?)	15 Jan 1988	Ciudad Juárez, Chihuahua, Mexico	
18	Draw	16–1–1	Javier Díaz	PTS	10	1 Jan 1988	Ciudad Juárez, Chihuahua, Mexico	
17	Win	16–1	Pedro Moreno	KO	1 (?)	27 Nov 1987	Ciudad Acuña, Coahuila, Mexico	
16	Win	15–1	Javier Ramírez	KO	7 (?)	2 Oct 1987	Ciudad Acuña, Coahuila, Mexico	
15	Loss	14–1	Luis Fernando Hernández	PTS	10	30 Jul 1987	Ciudad Juárez, Chihuahua, Mexico	
14	Win	14–0	Alfonso Rivera	TKO	7 (?)	1 May 1987	Ciudad Juárez, Chihuahua, Mexico	
13	Win	13–0	Jorge Vazquez	KO	3 (?)	4 Apr 1987	Ciudad Juárez, Chihuahua, Mexico	
12	Win	12–0	Jaime Herrera	KO	3 (?)	13 Mar 1987	Ciudad Juárez, Chihuahua, Mexico	
11	Win	11–0	Fermín Cárdenas	KO	4 (?)	1 Feb 1987	Ciudad Lerdo, Coahuila, Mexico	
10	Win	10–0	Nacho Ramírez	RTD	3 (10)	1 Jan 1987	Auditorio Municipal, Torreón, Mexico	
9	Win	9–0	Juan Manuel Olvera	TKO	1 (8)	31 Oct 1986	Auditorio Municipal, Torreón, Mexico	
8	Win	8–0	Fausto González	KO	2 (?)	1 Sep 1986	Torreón, Coahuila, Mexico	
7	Win	7–0	Martín Ramírez	KO	3 (?)	1 Aug 1986	Torreón, Coahuila, Mexico	
6	Win	6–0	Fernando Castrejón	KO	2 (?)	1 Jul 1986	Torreón, Coahuila, Mexico	
5	Win	5–0	Rafael Rodarte	KO	3 (?)	1 Jun 1986	Ciudad Lerdo, Durango, Mexico	
4	Win	4–0	Saúl Sáenz	KO	1 (?)	1 May 1986	Ciudad Lerdo, Durango, Mexico	
3	Win	3–0	Carlos García	KO	1 (4)	26 Apr 1986	Auditorio Municipal, Torreón, Mexico	
2	Win	2–0	Gabriel Ocampo	KO	1 (?)	1 Apr 1986	Ciudad Lerdo, Durango, Mexico	
1	Win	1–0	Francisco Galindo	KO	1 (?)	1 Mar 1986	Ciudad Lerdo, Durango, Mexico	

== See also ==
- List of Mexican boxing world champions
- List of WBC world champions
- List of featherweight boxing champions

Preceded by Luisito Espinosa	WBC Featherweight Champion; 15 May 1999– 22 Oct 1999	Succeeded by Naseem Hamed
