= Antonio Hernández (boxer) =

Mexican boxer

Personal information
- Nickname: Monito
- Born: Antonio Hernández Duéñez; September 12, 1970 (age 55) Victoria de Durango, Durango, Mexico
- Height: 5 ft 5 in (165 cm)
- Weight: Featherweight; Super featherweight

Boxing career
- Reach: 71 in (180 cm)
- Stance: Orthodox

Boxing record
- Total fights: 77
- Wins: 53
- Win by KO: 41
- Losses: 24

Antonio Hernández Duéñez (born September 12, 1970) is a Mexican former professional boxer.

== Professional career ==
Hernández turned professional in 1988 & compiled a record of 49–22 before facing & defeating compatriot Justin Juuko, to win the interim WBA super-featherweight title. He would lose the title in his next fight against title in his next fight against Joel Casamayor.

== Professional boxing record ==
77 fights	53 wins	24 losses
By knockout	41	10
By decision	12	14

No.	Result	Record	Opponent	Type	Round, time	Date	Location	Notes
77	Loss	53–24	Noel Cortez	UD	10 (10)	2005-12-16	Gimnasio de la Seccion 44, Victoria de Durango, Mexico	
76	Win	53–23	Juan Ruiz	KO	6 (10)	2003-10-31	Auditorio Gerardo Zubia, Victoria de Durango, Mexico	
75	Win	52–23	Cesar Castro	KO	2 (10)	2003-09-06	Auditorio Gerardo Zubia, Victoria de Durango, Mexico	
74	Win	51–23	Omar Jara	KO	5 (10)	2003-05-16	Victoria de Durango, Mexico	
73	Loss	50–23	Joel Casamayor	UD	12 (12)	1999-06-19	Miccosukee Resort & Gaming, Miami, Florida, U.S.	Lost interim WBA super-featherweight title
72	Win	50–22	Justin Juuko	TKO	11 (12)	1999-02-20	Will Rogers Memorial Center, Fort Worth, Texas, U.S.	Won interim WBA super-featherweight title
71	Win	49–22	Armando Bosquez	PTS	12 (12)	1998-05-01	Ciudad Juárez, Mexico	Retained Mexican super-featherweight title
70	Win	48–22	Raul Franco	TKO	11 (12)	1998-02-23	Victoria de Durango, Mexico	Won vacant WBA Fedelatin super-featherweight title
69	Win	47–22	Ismael Aviles	TKO	6 (?)	1997-10-17	Victoria de Durango, Mexico	
68	Win	46–22	Julio Álvarez	TKO	6 (12)	1997-07-04	Victoria de Durango, Mexico	Won Mexican super-featherweight title
67	Win	45–22	Atahualpa Vergara	TKO	2 (?)	1997-04-18	Victoria de Durango, Mexico	
66	Loss	44–22	November Ntshingila	UD	10 (10)	1997-02-28	Twin Towns Services Club, Tweed Heads, Australia	
65	Win	44–21	Ramon Carrasco	TKO	3 (?)	1997-01-01	Victoria de Durango, Mexico	
64	Loss	43–21	Genaro Hernández	UD	10 (10)	1996-09-28	Will Rogers Memorial Center, Fort Worth, Texas, U.S.	
63	Win	43–20	Javier Pichardo	TKO	5 (10)	1996-09-13	Victoria de Durango, Mexico	
62	Win	42–20	Abigail Contreras	PTS	10 (10)	1996-07-19	Victoria de Durango, Mexico	
61	Loss	41–20	Ismael Aviles	TKO	4 (?)	1996-03-15	Mexico	
60	Win	41–19	Paulino Gonzalez	PTS	10 (10)	1996-02-16	Mexico	
59	Loss	40–19	César Soto	TKO	2 (10)	1995-10-13	Fantasy Springs Resort Casino, Indio, California, U.S.	
58	Loss	40–18	Ángel Aldama	KO	4 (?)	1995-08-04	Victoria de Durango, Mexico	
57	Win	40–17	Lorenzo Tiznado	TKO	5 (?)	1995-08-04	Victoria de Durango, Mexico	
56	Win	39–17	Ramon Soto	TKO	7 (10)	1995-07-07	Mexico	
55	Loss	38–17	Orlando Fernandez	UD	8 (8)	1995-05-04	Ponce, Puerto Rico	
54	Win	38–16	José Luis Meza	KO	3 (?)	1995-03-31	Victoria de Durango, Mexico	
53	Loss	37–16	Victor Laureano	UD	8 (8)	1995-02-27	Condado, Puerto Rico	
52	Loss	37–15	Héctor Arroyo	PTS	10 (10)	1994-11-01	San Juan, Puerto Rico	
51	Win	37–14	Antonio Arias	PTS	10 (10)	1994-10-14	Mexico	
50	Loss	36–14	Jesse Magana	TKO	3 (?)	1994-06-13	Great Western Forum, Inglewood, California, U.S.	
49	Win	36–13	Juan Carlos Flores	KO	5 (?)	1994-03-25	Victoria de Durango, Mexico	
48	Loss	35–13	Mthobeli Mhlophe	KO	6 (10)	1994-01-23	Orient Theatre, East London, South Africa	
47	Loss	35–12	Javier Jáuregui	PTS	10 (10)	1993-12-17	Guadalajara, Mexico	
46	Win	35–11	Hector Lopez	KO	2 (?)	1993-09-20	Mexico	
45	Win	34–11	Ricardo Cervantes	TKO	3 (?)	1993-07-30	Victoria de Durango, Mexico	
44	Loss	33–11	Hector Lopez	TKO	3 (?)	1993-05-28	Victoria de Durango, Mexico	
43	Loss	33–10	Gustavo Corral	TKO	7 (?)	1993-04-01	Mexico	
42	Win	33–9	Roberto Avila	PTS	10 (10)	1992-12-19	La Paz, Mexico	
41	Win	32–9	Cesar Mujica	KO	2 (?)	1992-11-13	Victoria de Durango, Mexico	
40	Loss	31–9	Tom Johnson	UD	10 (10)	1992-10-20	Resorts Casino Hotel, Atlantic City, New Jersey, U.S.	
39	Loss	31–8	Alejandro González	UD	10 (10)	1992-10-02	Guadalajara, Mexico	
38	Loss	31–7	Kevin Kelley	UD	10 (10)	1992-08-20	Resorts Casino Hotel, Atlantic City, New Jersey, U.S.	
37	Loss	31–6	Juan Angel Macias	PTS	10 (10)	1992-07-31	Plaza de Toros Alberto Balderas, Ciudad Lerdo, Mexico	
36	Loss	31–5	Simon González	PTS	10 (10)	1992-05-22	Ciudad Juárez, Mexico	
35	Loss	31–4	Gregorio Vargas	PTS	12 (12)	1992-04-12	Victoria de Durango, Mexico	For Mexican featherweight title
34	Win	31–3	Bernardo Gonzalez	KO	8 (?)	1992-01-31	Victoria de Durango, Mexico	
33	Win	30–3	Jorge Castro	PTS	10 (10)	1992-01-01	Victoria de Durango, Mexico	
32	Win	29–3	Enrique Ursua	TKO	3 (?)	1991-12-13	Mexico	
31	Win	28–3	Miguel Angel Pena	KO	5 (?)	1991-09-20	Mexico	
30	Win	27–3	Mario Alberto Rodriguez	PTS	10 (10)	1991-05-31	Victoria de Durango, Mexico	
29	Win	26–3	Roberto Ponce	TKO	7 (?)	1991-03-15	Mexico	
28	Loss	25–3	Juan Angel Macias	TKO	6 (10)	1991-01-01	Arena Olímpico Laguna, Gómez Palacio, Mexico	
27	Win	25–2	Jorge Fuentes	TKO	7 (?)	1990-09-30	Mexico	
26	Win	24–2	Armando Herrera	TKO	3 (?)	1990-07-21	Mexico	
25	Loss	23–2	Mauro Gutierrez	TKO	10 (10)	1990-06-29	Los Mochis, Mexico	
24	Win	23–1	Roberto Ponce	TKO	7 (?)	1990-05-01	Mexico	
23	Win	22–1	Martin Gallegos	KO	? (?)	1990-02-02	Mexico	
22	Win	21–1	Ernesto Lopez	TKO	2 (?)	1989-12-22	Mexico	
21	Win	20–1	Torito Bastidas	TKO	2 (?)	1989-11-28	Mexico	
20	Win	19–1	Gonzalo Rojas	TKO	3 (?)	1989-11-06	Mexico	
19	Win	18–1	Agapito Navarro	TKO	2 (?)	1989-10-16	Mexico	
18	Win	17–1	Alberto Dávila	TKO	6 (?)	1989-09-26	Mexico	
17	Win	16–1	Fermin De Leon	TKO	1 (?)	1989-09-04	Mexico	
16	Win	15–1	Gonzalo Dominguez	TKO	9 (?)	1989-08-27	Mexico	
15	Win	14–1	Agustin Teran	PTS	6 (6)	1989-08-06	Mexico	
14	Win	13–1	Moi Hernandez	PTS	8 (8)	1989-06-15	Mexico	
13	Win	12–1	Benjamin Gomez	KO	1 (8)	1989-04-07	Arena Olímpico Laguna, Gómez Palacio, Mexico	
12	Win	11–1	Alex Garcia	PTS	6 (6)	1989-03-11	Mexico	
11	Win	10–1	Ricardo Prayre	TKO	6 (?)	1989-02-06	Mexico	
10	Win	9–1	Arturo Rosales	PTS	6 (6)	1989-01-01	Mexico	
9	Win	8–1	Raul Gomez	TKO	2 (?)	1988-12-04	Mexico	
8	Win	7–1	Mario Jimenez	TKO	1 (?)	1988-09-09	Mexico	
7	Win	6–1	Ricardo Flores	KO	3 (?)	1988-07-26	Mexico	
6	Win	5–1	Jaime Palomares	TKO	4 (?)	1988-06-18	Mexico	
5	Loss	4–1	Oscar Zarate	KO	1 (?)	1988-04-30	Mexico City, Mexico	
4	Win	4–0	Fidencio Garcia	TKO	3 (?)	1988-03-23	Mexico	
3	Win	3–0	Felix Gomez	PTS	4 (4)	1988-02-17	Mexico	
2	Win	2–0	Raul Garcia	KO	2 (4)	1988-01-26	Mexico	
1	Win	1–0	Gilberto Diaz	KO	1 (4)	1988-01-01	Mexico	

Sporting positions
Regional boxing titles
Preceded by Julio Álvarez	Mexican super-featherweight champion July 4, 1997 – 1998; Vacated	Vacant Title next held by Julio Álvarez
Vacant Title last held by Miguel Casillas	WBA Fedelatin super-featherweight champion February 23, 1998 – 1998; Vacated	Vacant Title next held by Benito Rodriguez
World boxing titles
New title	WBA super-featherweight champion Interim title February 20, 1999 – June 19, 1999	Succeeded by Joel Casamayor
