= Naseem Hamed vs. César Soto =

1999 boxing match

- Date: October 22, 1999
- Venue: Joe Louis Arena, Detroit, Michigan, U.S.
- Title on the line: WBC/WBO/Lineal Featherweight Championship

Tale of the tape
Boxer	Naseem Hamed	César Soto
Nickname	"Prince"	"La Cobrita"
Hometown	Sheffield, England	Lerdo, Durango, Mexico
Pre-fight record	32–0	53–7–2
Height	5 ft 4 in (163 cm)	5 ft 6 in (168 cm)
Weight	126 lb (57 kg)	126 lb (57 kg)
Style	Southpaw	Orthodox
Recognition	WBO/Lineal; Featherweight Champion	WBC; Featherweight Champion

Naseem Hamed vs. César Soto was a professional boxing match contested on October 22, 1999, for the WBC, WBO and Lineal featherweight championships.

== Background ==
In August 1999, it was announced that WBO and lineal featherweight champion Naseem Hamed and WBC featherweight champion César Soto would fight in a unification bout on October 22 of that year. Hamed was making his 13th defense of his title, while Soto was making his first, having defeated Luisito Espinosa for the tile earlier in the year on May 15. Prior to agreeing to face Soto, Hamed had himself originally hoped to face Espinosa, who prior to losing to Soto, had reigned as WBC featherweight champion for over three years. However, Hamed claimed that he had offered to fight Espinosa five separate times, but that he "kept refusing” and was "afraid" to fight him.

One day prior to the fight, controversy erupted at the official weigh-in, as Soto weighed 13 ounces over the 126 pound featherweight limit on a digital scale provided by Hamed and his brothers. Soto protested this and insisted he be allowed to use his own old-fashioned mechanical scale that he had been using during his training camp to monitor his weight, at which he was able to make the 126 pound requirement. The Michigan State Athletic Commission approved the use of two scales. Hamed was angered by this, feeling that Soto had not made weight and was taking liberties. Hamed then referred to Soto as "weak" and promised an early knockout victory.

As the fight took place in Detroit, Michigan, home of Motown; Motown artists The Temptations performed their 1966 hit "Get Ready" before Hamed's entrance. After The Temptations were done with their performance, Hamed entered the arena to Mase's 1999 hit, also titled "Get Ready". His entrance consisted of him coming down a runway, pyrotechnics, and him getting on a microphone and hyping up the crowd.

== The fight ==
Despite Hamed's promise of a quick knockout, there were no knockdowns whatsoever during the fight. Hamed and Soto spent a large portion of the fight engaged in clinching, with Soto often illegally hitting Hamed during the break, for which referee Dale Grable constantly intervened and warned both fighters. Things dissipated in round 4 when Hamed placed Soto in a headlock during a clinch and was deducted a point for "unsportsmanlike conduct". The following round then saw Hamed body-slam Soto after Soto landed on Hamed's back following a slip by Hamed after-which Hamed was again deducted a point. In round 8, Soto was also deducted a point for a head-butt. Hamed, however, controlled most of the fights later rounds and won comfortably on all three judges' score cards, winning by scores of 116–108, 115–110 and 114–110.

== Aftermath ==
The fight was critically derided and fans in attendance heavily booed throughout. Soto's promoter Bob Arum called it "the worst fight" he had ever seen and said the fight made him "puke" and "That wasn't boxing. That was wrestling." Soto also criticized Hamed, calling him a "paper champion" and comparing him unfavorably to professional wrestler Hulk Hogan. In his post-fight interview, Hamed talked of possibly meeting in his next fight the then-reigning WBC super bantamweight champion Érik Morales, who had successfully defended his title against Wayne McCullough on the undercard, however Arum, who also promoted Morales, stated "I would never, ever let a fighter I was involved with get in with Hamed" and the fight never came to fruition.

The victory gave Hamed both the WBO and WBC featherweight titles, and though he expressed his desire to keep both titles, at the time, the WBC did not recognize the WBO as a major sanctioning body and refused to let Hamed keep both belts. WBC president José Sulaimán announced in December 1999 that a vote would be held to strip Hamed of the WBC championship. In January 2000, Hamed was officially stripped of the WBC featherweight championship, becoming the second time Hamed was stripped of a major world title, the first being the IBF featherweight championship in 1997.

== Fight card ==
Weight Class	Weight		vs.		Method	Round	Time	Notes
Featherweight	126 lb	Naseem Hamed (c)	def.	César Soto	UD	12/12		^{Note 1}
Super bantamweight	122 lb	Érik Morales (c)	def.	Wayne McCullough	UD	12/12		^{Note 2}
Heavyweight	200+ lb	Chris Byrd	def.	Val Smith	KO	2/10
Super Middleweight	168 lb	Kippy Warren	def.	Tarick Salmaci	MD	8/8
Heavyweight	200+ lb	Albert Sosnowski	def.	Jeff Lally	TKO	3/6
Heavyweight	200+ lb	Rune Lillebuen	def.	Curtis Taylor	UD	6/6

^Note 1 For WBC and WBO Featherweight title.
^Note 2 For WBC Super Bantamweight title.
