= Manuel Medina (boxer) =

Mexican boxer (born 1971)

Personal information
- Nickname: Mantecas ("Lard")
- Born: Juan Manuel Rubio Medina; March 30, 1971 (age 55) Tecuala, Nayarit, Mexico
- Height: 5 ft 9 in (175 cm)
- Weight: Featherweight; Super featherweight

Boxing career
- Reach: 69 in (175 cm)
- Stance: Orthodox

Boxing record
- Total fights: 84
- Wins: 67
- Win by KO: 32
- Losses: 16
- Draws: 1

Manuel Rubio Medina (born March 30, 1971) is a Mexican former professional boxer who competed from 1985 to 2008. He is a five-time featherweight champion, having held the IBF title thrice between 1991 and 2002, the WBC title in 1995, and the WBO title in 2003.

== Professional boxing career ==
Manuel Medina began his professional boxing career on September 9, 1985, beating Daniel Flores by a four-round decision in Mexicali, Mexico. Medina was only fourteen years old when his first professional fight took place.

Medina won one more fight, then lost two bouts in a row: on December 5, he lost a four-round decision to Gerardo Martinez in his first fight abroad, held in San Jose, California, United States. On January 16, 1986, he suffered his first knockout defeat, being stopped because of a cut by Alex Madrid in San Diego.

After losing to Madrid, Medina had a streak of twenty seven wins in a row. That streak was stopped by Juan C. Salazar, who outpointed Medina over ten rounds on July 10, 1989, in Tijuana. After two more victories, however, Medina contended for his first championship belt, the regional WBA "International" super featherweight title, which he won by a seventh round disqualification victory against Edgar Castro, on December 11 of that same year, in Inglewood. Medina retained that title twice, then defeated Tyrone Jackson on May 21, 1990, also at Inglewood by a twelve-round decision. In his next fight on 5 July, he outpointed former world featherweight champion and Barry McGuigan conqueror, Steve Cruz over ten rounds.

=== 1st Championship Reign ===
Medina won four bouts, then had his first chance at becoming a world champion, when, on August 12, 1991, he faced IBF featherweight champion Troy Dorsey in Inglewood. Medina was knocked down twice early, but became a world champion by getting up and defeating Dorsey by a twelve-round decision. He made four defenses of his title, including victories against Tom Johnson, beaten by a nine rounds technical decision and Fabrice Benichou, another world champion boxer, outpointed by Medina over twelve rounds. His first reign as world featherweight champion took him to places like France and Italy.

Medina lost the championship to Johnson by a twelve-round decision on their February 26, 1993 rematch, held in France. He turned to the super featherweight division, where he won one fight, then attempted to become world champion there also. But, on June 26 of the same year, he lost to IBF super featherweight champion John John Molina by a twelve-round decision, in Atlantic City.

=== 2nd Championship Reign ===
Medina then returned to featherweight, where he won two more fights before facing Johnson in a rubber match, held on January 28, 1995, at Atlantic City. Johnson retained the IBF featherweight title he had won from Medina by beating him via a twelve-round decision. In his next fight, Medina won the WBC's regional Fecarbox title by defeating Juan Polo Perez by a twelve-round unanimous decision on March 15 in Miami, Florida.

Medina's next fight was televised nationally in the United States, as he became world Featherweight champion for the second time, defeating Alejandro González on September 23 of '95, with a twelve-round unanimous decision, at Sacramento, California, for the WBC featherweight title. He lost the title in his first defense, losing a twelve-round decision to Luisito Espinosa on December 11 at Tokyo, Japan.

After a win, Medina tried to become a three time world featherweight champion by challenging Naseem Hamed for Hamed's WBO title, but he was defeated by Hamed with an eleventh-round knockout on August 31, 1996, in Dublin, Ireland. He followed that loss with a win, and another attempt at winning a world featherweight championship for a third time, this time around in a rematch with Espinosa. held on May 17, 1997. He lost to the Asian champion, this time by an eight rounds technical decision at Intramuros, Philippines. Medina then lost his next fight, by a ninth-round knockout on August 7, to future world champion Derrick Gainer.

On October 18, he recovered from his two loss streak to defeat Jose Ayala in Homestead, Florida, winning the WBA's Fedecentro regional championship, and setting himself in a position to obtain another chance at winning the world featherweight title for the third time. He knocked Ayala out in the eighth round.

=== 3rd Championship Reign ===
On April 24, 1998, Medina joined Carlos De León, Muhammad Ali, Sugar Ray Robinson, Edwin Rosario, Evander Holyfield and a small number of other boxers in the exclusive group of fighters to reign as world champions three or more times in the same division, when he outpointed defending IBF title holder Hector Lizarraga over twelve rounds in San Jose, California. He retained the title on April 16, 1999, in Las Vegas with a nine rounds technical decision over former world super featherweight champion Victor Polo, then proceeded to lose the championship to Paul Ingle.

The fight against Ingle, held on November 13 of the same year, in Hull, England, went on to be considered one of the fights of the year by boxing fans, experts and magazine writers alike. Floored in the second and tenth rounds, Medina almost saved his title when he dropped Ingle in the twelfth and last round. He ended up losing a unanimous decision, however.

Medina then met future world champion Frank Toledo, beating him in Las Vegas by a ten-round decision on May 19, 2000. Toledo then went on to win the IBF title by outpointing Mbulelo Botile, who had defeated Ingle. Medina, meanwhile, picked up two more wins, including a fourth-round knockout over future world title challenger Mike Juarez.

=== 4th Championship Reign ===
Medina and Toledo had a rematch on November 16, 2001, with Medina joining Robinson as a four-time world champion in the same division when he knocked Toledo out in the sixth round.

His next fight was filled with controversy. Faced against former two division world champion Johnny Tapia on April 27, 2002, Medina lost the title by a twelve-round majority decision at the Madison Square Garden in New York City. The decision was criticized for months to come by writers from such publications as Ring and KO Magazine. The official scorecards reflected a very close fight, with two judges scoring it 115-113 for Tapia and a third scoring the fight a 114–114 tie.

Medina's first attempt at tying Robinson's record as the only boxer to win a world title in the same division five times came on February 1, 2003, when he and Juan Manuel Márquez faced off in Las Vegas for the IBF championship vacated by Tapia. Medina was knocked out in the seventh round by Marquez, however.

=== 5th Championship Reign ===
After two more wins, Medina got his second chance at becoming world featherweight champion for the fifth time against WBO champion Scott Harrison. The two boxers fought for the first time on July 12 at the Braehead Arena in Glasgow, Scotland. Medina made history and joined Robinson as the only two fighters in history to be five-time world champions in the same division, by defeating Harrison, who until then had been defeated only once, by a twelve-round split decision. A boxing magazine from the United States then called Medina the gambler's nightmare, because of his tendency to win world featherweight titles, lose them quickly, then regain them just as quick.

Medina and Harrison were rematched on November 29 of the same year, and Harrison regained the WBO title with an eleventh-round knockout of Medina, again, at the Braehead Arena in Glasgow.

=== Super featherweight ===
Medina only fought once in 2004, defeating Leonardo Resendiz on July 23 at Rancho Mirage, California by a third-round knockout, to win the WBA's regional NABA super featherweight title.

He was to fight José Miguel Cotto on August 20, 2005, in Ponce, Puerto Rico. Had he beaten Cotto, he would have put himself in a position to challenge for the WBO super featherweight title. Cotto was not able to reduce weight to the super featherweight weight limit, however, so the fight was suspended.

On 31-05-2006 he fought Cassius Baloyi for the IBF super featherweight title, the same title he'd challenged Molina for back in 1993, and lost by 11th-round TKO.

Medina returned to outpoint Kevin Kelley by a twelve-round majority decision, then fought a rematch with Baloyi on 05-07-2007 which was scored a technical draw after Medina suffered a cut from an accidental clash of heads. In his final fight, Medina lost by a two-round TKO to Malcolm Klassen. These final three bouts were all IBF super featherweight Title Eliminators.

Medina has a record of 64 wins and 15 losses in 78 professional boxing bouts, with 30 wins by way of knockout.

== Professional boxing record ==
| 84 fights | 67 wins | 16 losses |
|---|---|---|
| By knockout | 32 | 8 |
| By decision | 34 | 8 |
| By disqualification | 1 | 0 |
| Draws | 1 | |

| No. | Result | Record | Opponent | Type | Round, time | Date | Age | Location | Notes |
|---|---|---|---|---|---|---|---|---|---|
| 84 | Loss | 67–16–1 | Malcolm Klassen | TKO | 2 (12), 1:49 | Aug 29, 2008 | 37 years, 152 days | Carousel Casino, Hammanskraal, North-West, South Africa | |
| 83 | Draw | 67–15–1 | Cassius Baloyi | TD | 4 (12) | Jul 5, 2007 | 36 years, 98 days | Emperors Palace, Kempton Park, Gauteng, South Africa | |
| 82 | Win | 67–15 | Kevin Kelley | MD | 12 | Nov 11, 2006 | 35 years, 226 days | Madison Square Garden, New York City, New York, U.S. | |
| 81 | Loss | 66–15 | Cassius Baloyi | TKO | 11 (12), 2:19 | May 31, 2006 | 35 years, 62 days | Northern Quest Casino, Airway Heights, Washington, U.S. | For IBO and vacant IBF super featherweight titles |
| 80 | Win | 66–14 | Javier Osvaldo Alvarez | UD | 12 | Mar 24, 2006 | 34 years, 359 days | Orleans Hotel & Casino, Las Vegas, Nevada, U.S. | |
| 79 | Win | 65–14 | Miguel Angel Galindo | RTD | 5 (10), 0:10 | Sep 9, 2005 | 34 years, 163 days | El Foro, Tijuana, Baja California, Mexico | |
| 78 | Win | 64–14 | Leonardo Resendiz | TKO | 3 (12) | Jul 23, 2004 | 33 years, 115 days | Agua Caliente Casino, Rancho Mirage, California, U.S. | Won vacant NABA super featherweight title |
| 77 | Loss | 63–14 | Scott Harrison | TKO | 11 (12), 0:31 | Nov 29, 2003 | 32 years, 244 days | Braehead Arena, Glasgow, Scotland, U.K. | Lost WBO featherweight title |
| 76 | Win | 63–13 | Scott Harrison | SD | 12 | Jul 12, 2003 | 32 years, 104 days | Braehead Arena, Glasgow, Scotland, U.K. | Won WBO featherweight title |
| 75 | Win | 62–13 | Pedro Cruz | KO | 1 (?) | Jun 6, 2003 | 32 years, 68 days | Auditorio Municipal, Rosarito, Baja California, Mexico | |
| 74 | Win | 61–13 | Juan Ruiz | TKO | 5 (8) | Apr 28, 2003 | 32 years, 29 days | Hotel Camino Real, Tijuana, Baja California, Mexico | |
| 73 | Loss | 60–13 | Juan Manuel Márquez | TKO | 7 (12), 1:18 | Feb 1, 2003 | 31 years, 308 days | Mandalay Bay Resort & Casino, Las Vegas, Nevada, U.S. | For vacant IBF featherweight title |
| 72 | Loss | 60–12 | Johnny Tapia | MD | 12 | Apr 27, 2002 | 31 years, 27 days | Orleans Hotel & Casino, Las Vegas, Nevada, U.S. | Lost IBF featherweight title |
| 71 | Win | 60–11 | Frank Toledo | TKO | 5 (12), 0:05 | Nov 16, 2001 | 30 years, 231 days | Orleans Hotel & Casino, Las Vegas, Nevada, U.S. | Won IBF featherweight title |
| 70 | Win | 59–11 | Mike Juarez | KO | 4 (10), 2:42 | Apr 27, 2001 | 30 years, 28 days | Orleans Hotel & Casino, Las Vegas, Nevada, U.S. | |
| 69 | Win | 58–11 | Daniel Rodriguez | U | 10 | Oct 20, 2000 | 29 years, 204 days | Orleans Hotel & Casino, Las Vegas, Nevada, U.S. | |
| 68 | Win | 57–11 | Frank Toledo | UD | 10 | May 19, 2000 | 29 years, 50 days | Orleans Hotel & Casino, Las Vegas, Nevada, U.S. | |
| 67 | Loss | 56–11 | Paul Ingle | UD | 12 | Nov 13, 1999 | 28 years, 228 days | K.C. Sports Arena, Cottingham, Hull, Yorkshire, England, U.K. | Lost IBF featherweight title |
| 66 | Win | 56–10 | Victor Polo | TD | 9 (12), 3:00 | Apr 16, 1999 | 28 years, 17 days | Orleans Hotel & Casino, Las Vegas, Nevada, U.S. | Retained IBF featherweight title |
| 65 | Win | 55–10 | Héctor Lizárraga | UD | 12 | Apr 24, 1998 | 27 years, 25 days | San Jose Arena, San Jose, California, U.S. | Won IBF featherweight title |
| 64 | Win | 54–10 | Jose Ayala | TKO | 8 (12) | Oct 18, 1997 | 26 years, 202 days | Curt Ivy PAL Gym, Homestead, Florida, U.S. | Won WBA Fedecentro featherweight title |
| 63 | Loss | 53–10 | Derrick Gainer | KO | 9 (12), 1:20 | Aug 7, 1997 | 26 years, 130 days | Foxwoods Resort, Mashantucket, Connecticut, U.S. | For NABU super featherweight title |
| 62 | Loss | 53–9 | Luisito Espinosa | TD | 8 (12) | May 17, 1997 | 26 years, 48 days | Luneta Park, Manila, Metro Manila, Philippines | For WBC featherweight title |
| 61 | Win | 53–8 | Rosario Hernandez | KO | 1 (?) | Dec 16, 1996 | 25 years, 261 days | Tijuana, Baja California, Mexico | |
| 60 | Loss | 52–8 | Naseem Hamed | TKO | 11 (12), 3:00 | Aug 31, 1996 | 25 years, 154 days | The Point, Dublin, Ireland | For WBO featherweight title |
| 59 | Win | 52–7 | Benito Rodriguez | UD | 10 | Apr 12, 1996 | 25 years, 13 days | Tijuana, Baja California, Mexico | |
| 58 | Loss | 51–7 | Luisito Espinosa | UD | 12 | Dec 11, 1995 | 24 years, 256 days | Korakuen Hall, Tokyo, Japan | Lost WBC featherweight title |
| 57 | Win | 51–6 | Alejandro González | SD | 12 | Sep 23, 1995 | 24 years, 177 days | Convention Center, Sacramento, California, U.S. | Won WBC featherweight title |
| 56 | Win | 50–6 | Juan Polo Perez | UD | 12 | Apr 15, 1995 | 24 years, 16 days | Jai Alai Fronton, Miami, Florida, U.S. | Won vacant WBC FECARBOX featherweight title |
| 55 | Loss | 49–6 | Tom Johnson | UD | 12 | Jan 28, 1995 | 23 years, 304 days | Ballys Park Place Hotel Casino, Atlantic City, New Jersey, U.S. | For IBF featherweight title |
| 54 | Win | 49–5 | Jose Luis Martinez | UD | 12 | Sep 26, 1994 | 23 years, 180 days | Great Western Forum, Inglewood, California, U.S. | Won vacant NABF featherweight title |
| 53 | Win | 48–5 | Lorenzo Tiznado | TKO | 2 (?) | Jun 3, 1994 | 23 years, 65 days | Tijuana, Baja California, Mexico | |
| 52 | Loss | 47–5 | John John Molina | UD | 12 | Jun 26, 1993 | 22 years, 88 days | Convention Center, Atlantic City, New Jersey, U.S. | For IBF super featherweight title |
| 51 | Win | 47–4 | Francisco Valdez | TKO | 8 (?) | May 11, 1993 | 22 years, 42 days | Tijuana, Baja California, Mexico | |
| 50 | Loss | 46–4 | Tom Johnson | SD | 12 | Feb 26, 1993 | 21 years, 333 days | Salle de Fetes, Melun, France | Lost IBF featherweight title |
| 49 | Win | 46–3 | Moussa Sangare | MD | 12 | Oct 23, 1992 | 21 years, 207 days | La Salle du Sportica, Gravelines, France | Retained IBF featherweight title |
| 48 | Win | 45–3 | Jorge Rodriguez | UD | 8 | Sep 12, 1992 | 21 years, 166 days | Patinoire de Toulouse, Blagnac, France | |
| 47 | Win | 44–3 | Fabrizio Cappai | RTD | 10 (12) | Jul 22, 1992 | 21 years, 114 days | Palazzo Dello Sport, Capo d'Orlando, Sicilia, Italy | Retained IBF featherweight title |
| 46 | Win | 43–3 | Fabrice Benichou | SD | 12 | Mar 14, 1992 | 20 years, 350 days | Espace Piscine, Antibes, France | Retained IBF featherweight title |
| 45 | Win | 42–3 | Tom Johnson | TD | 9 (12) | Nov 18, 1991 | 20 years, 233 days | Great Western Forum, Inglewood, California, U.S. | Retained IBF featherweight title |
| 44 | Win | 41–3 | Troy Dorsey | UD | 12 | Aug 12, 1991 | 20 years, 135 days | Great Western Forum, Inglewood, California, U.S. | Won IBF featherweight title |
| 43 | Win | 40–3 | Agustin Salinas | TKO | 8 (?) | May 30, 1991 | 20 years, 61 days | Acapulco, Gurerro, Mexico | |
| 42 | Win | 39–3 | Mario Gomez | KO | 5 (?) | May 17, 1991 | 20 years, 48 days | Tijuana, Baja California, Mexico | |
| 41 | Win | 38–3 | Edward Parker | MD | 10 | Dec 6, 1990 | 19 years, 251 days | Great Western Forum, Inglewood, California | |
| 40 | Win | 37–3 | Bruno Rabanales | UD | 10 | Sep 3, 1990 | 19 years, 157 days | Tijuana, Baja California, Mexico | |
| 39 | Win | 36–3 | Steve Cruz | UD | 10 | Jul 8, 1990 | 19 years, 100 days | Hilton Hotel, Las Vegas, Nevada, U.S. | |
| 38 | Win | 35–3 | Tyrone Jackson | UD | 12 | May 21, 1990 | 19 years, 52 days | Great Western Forum, Inglewood, California, U.S. | |
| 37 | Win | 34–3 | Ben Lopez | TKO | 8 (12) | Mar 26, 1990 | 18 years, 361 days | Great Western Forum, Inglewood, California, U.S. | Retained WBA inter-continental super featherweight title |
| 36 | Win | 33–3 | Rafael Ortega | TKO | 8 (12), 2:25 | Feb 16, 1990 | 18 years, 323 days | International Amphitheatre, Chicago, Illinois, U.S. | Retained WBA inter-continental super featherweight title; Not to be confused with Rafael Ortega |
| 35 | Win | 32–3 | Edgar Castro | DQ | 7 (12) | Dec 11, 1989 | 18 years, 256 days | Great Western Forum, Inglewood, California, U.S. | Won WBA inter-continental super featherweight title |
| 34 | Win | 31–3 | Jose Mendez | KO | 3 (?) | Nov 16, 1989 | 18 years, 231 days | Tijuana, Baja California, Mexico | |
| 33 | Win | 30–3 | Juan Manuel Vega | TKO | 6 (?) | Sep 16, 1989 | 18 years, 170 days | Monumental Plaza de Toros México, Mexico City, Distrito Federal, Mexico | |
| 32 | Loss | 29–3 | Juan Carlos Salazar | TKO | 10 (?) | Jul 10, 1989 | 18 years, 102 days | Auditorio Municipal, Tijuana, Baja California, Mexico | |
| 31 | Win | 29–2 | Ashby Dancy | TKO | 1 (?), 3:00 | May 21, 1989 | 18 years, 52 days | Veteran's Memorial Coliseum, Phoenix, Arizona, U.S. | |
| 30 | Win | 28–2 | Ashby Dancy | TKO | 1 (?) | May 21, 1989 | 18 years, 52 days | Veteran's Memorial Coliseum, Phoenix, Arizona, U.S. | |
| 29 | Win | 27–2 | Jose Luis Calderon | TKO | 3 (?) | Apr 3, 1989 | 18 years, 4 days | Tijuana, Baja California, Mexico | |
| 28 | Win | 26–2 | Miguel Molina | KO | 6 (?) | Mar 11, 1989 | 17 years, 346 days | Culiacan, Sinaloa, Mexico | |
| 27 | Win | 25–2 | Mariano Canete | TKO | 4 (?) | Feb 20, 1989 | 17 years, 327 days | Tijuana, Baja California, Mexico | |
| 26 | Win | 24–2 | Manuel Camacho | TKO | 4 (?) | Dec 5, 1988 | 17 years, 250 days | Tijuana, Baja California, Mexico | |
| 25 | Win | 23–2 | Ramiro Rodriguez | UD | 10 | Oct 17, 1988 | 17 years, 201 days | Tijuana, Baja California, Mexico | |
| 24 | Win | 22–2 | Santiago Parra | KO | 6 (?) | Aug 22, 1988 | 17 years, 145 days | Tijuana, Baja California, Mexico | |
| 23 | Win | 21–2 | Luis Mora | UD | 10 | May 9, 1988 | 17 years, 40 days | Tijuana, Baja California, Mexico | |
| 22 | Win | 20–2 | Marco Antonio Santos | KO | 3 (?) | Feb 8, 1988 | 16 years, 315 days | Tijuana, Baja California, Mexico | |
| 21 | Win | 19–2 | Julio Valle | PTS | 10 | Oct 16, 1987 | 16 years, 200 days | Tijuana, Baja California, Mexico | |
| 20 | Win | 18–2 | Jorge Aguilar | KO | 4 (?) | Oct 5, 1987 | 16 years, 189 days | Tijuana, Baja California, Mexico | |
| 19 | Win | 17–2 | Antonio Flores | PTS | 6 | Aug 10, 1987 | 16 years, 133 days | Tijuana, Baja California, Mexico | |
| 18 | Win | 16–2 | Martin Juarez | UD | 4 | Jul 16, 1987 | 16 years, 108 days | El Cortez Hotel, San Diego, California, U.S. | |
| 17 | Win | 15–2 | Jorge Salas | KO | 4 (?) | Jun 15, 1987 | 16 years, 77 days | Tijuana, Baja California, Mexico | |
| 16 | Win | 14–2 | Chiqui Ruiz | PTS | 6 | Mar 30, 1987 | 16 years, 0 days | Tijuana, Baja California, Mexico | |
| 15 | Win | 13–2 | Jose Enriquez | PTS | 6 | Feb 9, 1987 | 15 years, 316 days | Tijuana, Baja California, Mexico | |
| 14 | Win | 12–2 | Jose Nunez | PTS | 6 | Dec 6, 1986 | 15 years, 251 days | Mexico | |
| 13 | Win | 11–2 | Jaime Reyes | PTS | 6 | Dec 1, 1986 | 15 years, 246 days | Tijuana, Baja California, Mexico | |
| 12 | Win | 10–2 | Pablo Carrasco | KO | 3 (?) | Sep 8, 1986 | 15 years, 162 days | Tijuana, Baja California, Mexico | |
| 11 | Win | 9–2 | Oldemar Soto | TKO | 6 (?) | Aug 8, 1986 | 15 years, 131 days | Tijuana, Baja California, Mexico | |
| 10 | Win | 8–2 | Roberto Garcia | KO | 3 (?) | Jul 19, 1986 | 15 years, 111 days | Plaza de Toros Calafia, Mexicali, Baja California, Mexico | |
| 9 | Win | 7–2 | Oldemar Soto | PTS | 4 | May 9, 1986 | 15 years, 40 days | Tijuana, Baja California, Mexico | |
| 8 | Win | 6–2 | Aquilino Ceballos | KO | 1 (?) | Apr 25, 1986 | 15 years, 26 days | Tijuana, Baja California, Mexico | |
| 7 | Win | 5–2 | Jose Venegas | PTS | 4 | Apr 4, 1986 | 15 years, 5 days | Tijuana, Baja California, Mexico | |
| 6 | Win | 4–2 | Jose Trujillo | KO | 2 (?) | Mar 12, 1986 | 14 years, 347 days | Tijuana, Baja California, Mexico | |
| 5 | Win | 3–2 | Victor Mendoza | PTS | 4 | Feb 10, 1986 | 14 years, 317 days | Tijuana, Baja California, Mexico | |
| 4 | Loss | 2–2 | Alex Madrid | TKO | 4 (5) | Jan 16, 1986 | 14 years, 292 days | El Cortez Hotel, San Diego, California, U.S. | |
| 3 | Loss | 2–1 | Gerardo Martinez | PTS | 4 | Dec 5, 1985 | 14 years, 250 days | Civic Auditorium, San Jose, California, U.S. | |
| 2 | Win | 2–0 | Roberto Garcia | PTS | 6 | Nov 10, 1985 | 14 years, 225 days | Tijuana, Baja California, Mexico | |
| 1 | Win | 1–0 | Daniel Flores | PTS | 4 | Oct 9, 1985 | 14 years, 193 days | Tijuana, Baja California, Mexico | |

== See also ==
- List of Mexican boxing world champions

Sporting positions
Regional boxing titles
| New title | WBA super featherweight champion Inter-Continental title December 11, 1989 – August 12, 1991; Won IBF featherweight title | Vacant Title next held by Tontcho Tontchev |
| Vacant Title last held by Victor Polo | WBC featherweight champion FECARBOX title April 15 – 23 September 1995; Won world title | Vacant Title next held by Damian Brazoban |
World boxing titles
| Preceded by Troy Dorsey | IBF featherweight champion August 12, 1991 – February 26, 1993 | Succeeded by Tom Johnson |
| Preceded by Alejandro González | WBC featherweight champion September 23, 1995 – December 11, 1995 | Succeeded by Luisito Espinosa |
| Preceded by Hector Lizarraga | IBF featherweight champion April 24, 1998 – November 13, 1999 | Succeeded by Paul Ingle |
| Preceded by Frank Toledo | IBF featherweight champion November 16, 2001 – April 27, 2002 | Succeeded by Johnny Tapia |
| Preceded by Scott Harrison | WBO featherweight champion July 12, 2003 – November 29, 2003 | Succeeded by Scott Harrison |
Achievements
| Previous: Sugar Ray Robinson | Quintuple Champion in One Division; July 12, 2003 | Most Recent |
