= Steve Cruz =

American boxer (born 1963)

Personal information
- Nicknames: Stevie, Super Kid
- Nationality: American
- Born: Estevan Cruz Jr. November 2, 1963 (age 62) Fort Worth, Texas, U.S.
- Height: 5 ft 6 in (168 cm)
- Weight: Featherweight

Boxing career
- Reach: 68 in (173 cm)
- Stance: Orthodox

Boxing record
- Total fights: 45
- Wins: 37
- Win by KO: 19
- Losses: 8

Steve "Stevie" Cruz (born November 2, 1963) is a retired American professional boxer who became the WBA World Featherweight Champion on June 23, 1986. His trainer for much of his career was Don Gorman.

== Early life and amateur career ==
Cruz, who is of Mexican descent was born of modest means in a barrio on the south side of Fort Worth, Texas on November 2, 1963. He graduated from Trimble Technical High School. Fairly early in his career, Cruz was trained and managed by Don Gorman, who operated the influential Gorman Gym in Fort Worth. Donald Curry, who was once the undisputed world welterweight champion and would take the WBC super welterweight title in 1988, also trained at the Gorman Gymnasium.

An exceptional amateur, Cruz won the 1979 National Junior Olympic Gold Medal at 112 pounds and the 1981 National Golden Gloves title at 119 pounds. He was also a three-time Fort Worth Golden Gloves champion and a two-time Star-Telegram Texas Golden Gloves champion. He gained the nickname "Super Kid".

Cruz turned professional in 1981, and won his first nineteen fights between October 1981 and February 1984, fighting almost exclusively in Texas, with a few bouts in Las Vegas.

== Professional career ==
=== Early professional career highlights ===
On October 22, 1982, Cruz defeated Nicky Perez at Fort Worth's Will Rogers Coliseum before 2,700 fans in a ten-round unanimous decision. It was Cruz's first main event fight and his first full ten-rounder. He commented that he mostly counterpunched and felt somewhat tired by the end of the tenth. Perez would take the North American Boxing Federation (NABF) Super Featherweight title in his career. On November 9, Cruz would defeat Perez again in a ten-round unanimous points decision in Las Vegas. Cruz knocked Perez to the mat in the seventh and ninth rounds.

Cruz suffered one of his very few early career knockout losses to Lenny Valdez in Las Vegas in a first-round TKO, only 2:21 into the first round.

On December 3, 1985, Cruz defeated Tommy Cordova at the Showboat Hotel and Casino in Las Vegas, in a ninth-round technical knockout. Cordova was down twice in the eighth and once in the ninth. Using hard rights, body shots, and an explosive left jab, Cruz sent Cordova to the mat three times in the bout and gave him a considerable beating. Cordova was down twice in the eighth, first from a left, and then from a right to the body. The bout was stopped by the referee, 2:32 into the ninth round, after Cordova had been down once, and then nearly fell again. The bout was featured on ESPN in some markets. Two months earlier, on September 25, 1985, Cordova had unexpectedly lost to Baby Joe Ruelaz, having had trouble making weight and needing to lose eight pounds quickly.

On February 7, 1986, Cruz defeated Jorge "Rocky" Garcia in Las Vegas in a ten-round mixed decision. Garcia was a powerful puncher with a large percentage of wins by knockout.

=== Taking the WBA World Featherweight Championship, June 1986 ===
Cruz won the World Boxing Association (WBA) and lineal featherweight title by defeating Barry McGuigan on June 23, 1986 at Caesars Palace, Las Vegas, in a 15-round unanimous decision before 10,200 fans. Cruz's win was something of an upset, as he was a replacement for the injured Fernando Sosa. The bout was a grueling, fast-paced brawl in the sweltering 110-degree heat of the outdoor ring. Another factor in the upset was that Cruz was rated only the ninth featherweight in the world by the WBA; McGuigan led the early betting 6 to 1. McGuigan hit the canvas three times, twice in the final fifteenth round from a furious assault by Cruz. After the bout, McGuigan was hospitalized overnight for a mild concussion, and was also affected by severe dehydration from the excessive heat in the arena. The bout was proclaimed The Ring magazine's 1986 Fight of the Year. Cruz received some training guidance for the bout with McGuigan from Don Gorman, who had him spar with one of his trainees, Troy Dorsey, future 1991 International Boxing Federation (IBF) World Featherweight Champion. Dorsey's aggressive style was similar to McGuigan's, and may have aided Cruz in his upset win.

On November 21, 1986, Cruz defeated Mexican boxer Roger Arevalo in a ten-round points decision at Fort Worth, Texas. Arevalo would later take the Mexican Superfeatherweight title. Cruz took around $20,000 for the bout, a modest sum for a world champion.

==== Losing the World Featherweight Championship, March 1987 ====
Cruz lost the Featherweight Championship in his first defense to Venezuelan Antonio Esparragoza, the number one-rated challenger, at the Will Rogers Coliseum in Fort Worth on March 6, 1987 in a twelfth-round technical knockout (TKO). Esparragoza floored Cruz twice in the twelfth round. The Associated Press had Esparragoza winning seven rounds to four for Cruz when the fight was stopped at 2:28 of the twelfth round. It was only Cruz's second defeat in 29 recorded bouts.

=== Taking the WBC Continental Americas Featherweight Championship, May 1989 ===
On June 14, 1988, Cruz took the World Boxing Council (WBC) Continental America's Featherweight title against Alfred Rangel in a fifth-round technical knockout at the Superdome in New Orleans, Louisiana. On August 12 of that year, he defended the title against Fred Adams in Pasadena, Texas, winning in a fourth-round knockout.

On May 14, 1989, he defeated future champion Tracy Harris Patterson in a ten-round split decision at the Trump Plaza Hotel in Atlantic City, New Jersey. Cruz floored Patterson in the final minute of the eighth round with a left hook, though Patterson was up at the count of three. Cruz dominated the ninth and tenth rounds and won the bout in the decision of two of the three judges. Patterson was the adopted son of Floyd Patterson, former heavyweight champion, who was in his corner.

=== Challenging for the IBF Featherweight title, August 1989 ===
Cruz challenged for the IBF Featherweight title on August 6, 1989 by taking on Jorge Páez, but lost in a twelfth-round unanimous decision in El Paso, Texas. Cruz caught Páez in the middle of the second round with a right that floored him. Paez took a standing eight count and continued the bout. It was the first time Paez had been knocked down in his career.

On March 31, 1991, Cruz took on Rafael Ruelas at the Sands Hotel in Las Vegas before a crowd of 800 in a North American Boxing Federation (NABF) title match, losing by knockout 57 seconds into the third round. Cruz went down four times, three times in the second. Ruelas, with a significant five-inch advantage in height and reach, had been undefeated prior to meeting him.

=== Last shot at WBC World Featherweight title and last competitive bouts ===
On April 25, 1992, Cruz took on WBC featherweight title holder English boxer Paul Hodkinson, in Belfast, Northern Ireland, but lost by a TKO in the 3rd. Hodkinson floored him with a left hook thirty-five seconds into the third round causing the referee to stop the bout. Though Cruz rose from the knockdown, the referee determined he was having trouble seeing. It was Cruz's last attempt at the WBC World Featherweight title. After a second-round knockout loss to Yuji Wantanabe in Tokyo, Japan on August 10, 1992, Cruz won two more bouts, with Vicent Castillo and Robert Challa in Fort Worth, before retiring in December 1993.

== Life outside boxing ==
Cruz was working in 1987 as a plumber's apprentice in Fort Worth for Rivera Plumbing, though he had already taken the World Featherweight Championship in 1986. He was living modestly in a three-bedroom house with his wife and extended family. He had hopes of earning a plumber's journeyman's license.

== Professional boxing record ==
| 45 fights | 37 wins | 8 losses |
|---|---|---|
| By knockout | 19 | 5 |
| By decision | 18 | 3 |

| No. | Result | Record | Opponent | Type | Round, time | Date | Location | Notes |
|---|---|---|---|---|---|---|---|---|
| 45 | Win | 37–8 | Roberto Chala | UD | 10 | 1993-12-18 | Tarrant County Convention Center, Fort Worth, Texas, U.S. | |
| 44 | Win | 36–8 | Vicente Castillo | PTS | 6 | 1993-06-26 | Fort Worth, Texas, U.S. | |
| 43 | Loss | 35–8 | Yuji Watanabe | KO | 2 (10), 2:50 | 1992-08-10 | Japan | |
| 42 | Loss | 35–7 | Paul Hodkinson | TKO | 3 (12), 1:05 | 1992-04-25 | Maysfield Leisure Centre, Belfast, Northern Ireland, U.K. | For WBC Featherweight title |
| 41 | Loss | 35–6 | Rafael Ruelas | KO | 3 (12), 0:57 | 1991-03-31 | Sands Hotel and Casino, Paradise, Nevada, U.S. | For NABF Featherweight title |
| 40 | Win | 35–5 | Benito Rodriguez | PTS | 10 | 1990-09-25 | San Antonio, Texas, U.S. | |
| 39 | Loss | 34–5 | Manuel Medina | UD | 10 | 1990-07-08 | Hilton Hotel Las Vegas, Winchester, Nevada, U.S. | |
| 38 | Win | 34–4 | Ricky Alvarez | TKO | 10 (10), 1:20 | 1990-01-08 | Tarrant County Convention Center, Fort Worth, Texas, U.S. | |
| 37 | Loss | 33–4 | Jorge Páez | UD | 12 | 1989-08-06 | El Paso County Coliseum, El Paso, Texas, U.S. | For IBF Featherweight title |
| 36 | Win | 33–3 | Tracy Harris Patterson | SD | 10 | 1989-05-14 | Trump Plaza Hotel and Casino, Atlantic City, New Jersey, U.S. | |
| 35 | Win | 32–3 | Martin Galvan | TKO | 7 (10), 0:17 | 1988-12-09 | El Paso County Coliseum, El Paso, Texas, U.S. | |
| 34 | Win | 31–3 | Amos Cowart | TKO | 1 (10), 1:31 | 1988-09-30 | Citrus Center Showcase, Winter Haven, Florida, U.S. | |
| 33 | Win | 30–3 | Fred Adams | KO | 4 (12) | 1988-08-12 | Convention Center, Pasadena, Texas, U.S. | Retained WBC Continental Americas featherweight title |
| 32 | Win | 29–3 | Alfred Rangel | TKO | 5 (12) | 1988-06-14 | Superdome, New Orleans, Louisiana, U.S. | Won WBC Continental Americas Featherweight title |
| 31 | Loss | 28–3 | Jeff Franklin | UD | 10 | 1987-12-18 | Bally's Las Vegas, Paradise, Nevada, U.S. | |
| 30 | Win | 28–2 | Rogelio Lopez | TKO | 7 (10), 0:10 | 1987-08-16 | Billy Bob's Texas, Fort Worth, Texas, U.S. | |
| 29 | Loss | 27–2 | Antonio Esparragoza | TKO | 12 (12) | 1987-03-06 | Will Rogers Coliseum, Fort Worth, Texas, U.S. | Lost WBA &The Ring featherweight titles |
| 28 | Win | 27–1 | Roger Arevalo | SD | 10 | 1986-11-21 | Will Rogers Coliseum, Fort Worth, Texas, U.S. | |
| 27 | Win | 26–1 | Barry McGuigan | UD | 15 | 1986-06-23 | Caesars Palace, Paradise, Nevada, U.S. | Won WBA & The Ring featherweight titles |
| 26 | Win | 25–1 | Rocky Garcia | MD | 10 | 1986-02-07 | Showboat Hotel and Casino, Las Vegas, Nevada, U.S. | |
| 25 | Win | 24–1 | Tommy Cordova | TKO | 9 (10), 2:32 | 1985-12-03 | Showboat Hotel and Casino, Las Vegas, Nevada, U.S. | |
| 24 | Win | 23–1 | Juan Veloz | UD | 10 | 1985-06-22 | Trump Plaza Hotel and Casino, Atlantic City, New Jersey, U.S. | |
| 23 | Win | 22–1 | Jerome Brooks | TKO | 3 (8), 0:10 | 1985-05-28 | Gorman's Super Pro Gym, Fort Worth, Texas, U.S. | |
| 22 | Win | 21–1 | Jesus Lopez | TKO | 10 (10), 1:57 | 1984-12-15 | Tarrant County Convention Center, Fort Worth, Texas, U.S. | |
| 21 | Win | 20–1 | Salvador Ugalde | UD | 10 | 1984-06-16 | Will Rogers Coliseum, Fort Worth, Texas, U.S. | |
| 20 | Loss | 19–1 | Lenny Valdez | TKO | 1 (10), 1:21 | 1984-03-29 | Showboat Hotel and Casino, Las Vegas, Nevada, U.S. | |
| 19 | Win | 19–0 | Victor Acosta | MD | 10 | 1984-02-21 | Hyatt Regency Dallas, Dallas, Texas, U.S. | |
| 18 | Win | 18–0 | Dana Roston | UD | 10 | 1984-01-20 | Showboat Hotel and Casino, Las Vegas, Nevada, U.S. | |
| 17 | Win | 17–0 | Nicky Perez | UD | 10 | 1983-11-09 | Showboat Hotel and Casino, Las Vegas, Nevada, U.S. | |
| 16 | Win | 16–0 | Angel Hernandez | TKO | 1 (10) | 1983-10-13 | Registry Hotel Crystal Ballroom, Dallas, Texas, U.S. | |
| 15 | Win | 15–0 | Salvador Ugalde | UD | 8 | 1983-08-25 | Showboat Hotel and Casino, Las Vegas, Nevada, U.S. | |
| 14 | Win | 14–0 | Jose Resendez | PTS | 8 | 1983-07-28 | Showboat Hotel and Casino, Las Vegas, Nevada, U.S. | |
| 13 | Win | 13–0 | Ray Garza | UD | 8 | 1983-07-15 | Guys & Dolls Club, Fort Worth, Texas, U.S. | |
| 12 | Win | 12–0 | Nicky Perez | UD | 10 | 1982-10-22 | Will Rogers Coliseum, Fort Worth, Texas, U.S. | |
| 11 | Win | 11–0 | Javier Barajas | UD | 8 | 1982-08-01 | Freeman Coliseum, San Antonio, Texas, U.S. | |
| 10 | Win | 10–0 | Eddie Richardson | KO | 1 (10), 2:23 | 1982-07-14 | Will Rogers Coliseum, Fort Worth, Texas, U.S. | |
| 9 | Win | 9–0 | Andrew Rodriguez | TKO | 2 (8), 2:22 | 1982-06-26 | Will Rogers Coliseum, Fort Worth, Texas, U.S. | |
| 8 | Win | 8–0 | Carlos Flores | PTS | 8 | 1982-04-09 | Will Rogers Coliseum, Fort Worth, Texas, U.S. | |
| 7 | Win | 7–0 | Richard Fowler | TKO | 2 (6), 1:20 | 1982-03-10 | Lake Charles Civic Center, Lake Charles, Louisiana, U.S. | |
| 6 | Win | 6–0 | Juan Carlos Barbosa | TKO | 1 (6), 2:01 | 1982-02-26 | Freeman Coliseum, San Antonio, Texas, U.S. | |
| 5 | Win | 5–0 | Ali Akar | KO | 2 (6) | 1982-02-13 | Beaumont Civic Center, Beaumont, Texas, U.S. | |
| 4 | Win | 4–0 | Jesse Sierra | TKO | 5 (6) | 1982-01-15 | Will Rogers Coliseum, Fort Worth, Texas, U.S. | |
| 3 | Win | 3–0 | Ricky Cortez | KO | 1 (6) | 1981-12-15 | Civic Center, Lubbock, Texas, U.S. | |
| 2 | Win | 2–0 | Homero Gonzalez | TKO | 1 (6) | 1981-12-02 | Laredo, Texas, U.S. | |
| 1 | Win | 1–0 | Pascual Aranda | TKO | 1 (4), 1:51 | 1981-10-29 | Will Rogers Coliseum, Fort Worth, Texas, U.S. | |

== See also ==
- Lineal championship
- List of Mexican boxing world champions
- List of world featherweight boxing champions

Sporting positions
Amateur boxing titles
| Previous: Myron Taylor | Golden Gloves; Bantamweight champion 1981 | Next: Meldrick Taylor |
Regional boxing titles
| Vacant Title last held by Roberto Rivera | WBC Continental Americas featherweight champion June 14, 1988 – 1988; Vacated | Vacant Title next held by Tom Johnson |
World boxing titles
| Preceded by Barry McGuigan | WBA featherweight champion June 23, 1986 – March 6, 1987 | Succeeded by Antonio Esparragoza |
| Preceded by Barry McGuigan | The Ring featherweight champion June 23, 1986 – March 6, 1987 | Succeeded by Antonio Esparragoza |
Awards
| Previous: Marvin Hagler TKO 3 Thomas Hearns | The Ring Fight of the Year; W15 Barry McGuigan; 1986 | Next: Sugar Ray Leonard W 12; Marvin Hagler |
| Previous: Marvin Hagler vs. Thomas Hearns; Round 1 | The Ring Round of the Year vs. Barry McGuigan; Round 15; 1986 | Next: Kelvin Seabrooks vs. Thierry Jacob; Round 1 |
