= Tom Johnson (American boxer) =

American boxer (born 1964)

Personal information
- Nickname: Boom Boom
- Born: Thomas Douglas Johnson; July 15, 1964 (age 62) Evansville, Indiana, U.S.
- Height: 5 ft 5 1/2 in (166 cm)
- Weight: Featherweight; Super featherweight

Boxing career
- Reach: 69 1/2 in (177 cm)
- Stance: Orthodox

Boxing record
- Total fights: 63
- Wins: 51
- Win by KO: 28
- Losses: 10
- Draws: 2

Tom Johnson (born July 15, 1964) is an American former boxer who was the IBF featherweight champion of the world.

== Professional career ==
Known as "Boom Boom", Johnson turned pro in 1986 and in 1991 challenged Manuel Medina for the IBF Featherweight Title, losing a technical decision. In 1993 he rematched Medina and was able to win the title with a narrow split decision victory. Johnson was able to successfully defend the title 11 times including against Jose Badillo in Germany, before losing the belt to the young phenom Naseem Hamed via 8th-round TKO. Johnson never challenged for a major title again, and retired in 2002 after being TKO'd by Jorge Páez.

== Professional boxing record ==
63 fights	51 wins	10 losses
By knockout	28	3
By decision	23	7
Draws	2	

No.	Result	Record	Opponent	Type	Round, time	Date	Location	Notes
63	Loss	51–10–2	Jorge Páez	TKO	2 (10)	2002-02-22	Palace Indian Gaming Center, Lemoore, California, U.S.	
62	Loss	51–9–2	Jesús Chávez	RTD	8 (12)	2001-02-23	Frank Erwin Center, Austin, Texas, U.S.	For vacant NABF super-featherweight title
61	Win	51–8–2	David Turner	UD	10 (10)	2001-02-02	Robarts Arena, Sarasota, Florida, U.S.	
60	Win	50–8–2	Ernest Koffi	TKO	5 (10)	2001-01-12	Ramada Inn, Southfield, Michigan, U.S.	
59	Loss	49–8–2	Scott Harrison	UD	12 (12)	2000-07-15	London Arena, London, England, U.K.	For IBO Inter-Continental featherweight title
58	Win	49–7–2	Felipe Garcia	TKO	4 (?)	2000-06-16	The Palace, Auburn Hills, Michigan, U.S.	
57	Win	48–7–2	Agustin Lorenzo	PTS	10 (10)	2000-04-29	Oranjestad, Aruba	
56	Loss	47–7–2	Charles Shepherd	UD	12 (12)	1999-07-31	Sands Centre, Carlisle, England, U.K.	For vacant IBA super-featherweight title
55	Loss	47–6–2	Junior Jones	UD	12 (12)	1999-02-17	Van Andel Arena, Grand Rapids, Michigan, U.S.	For vacant IBA super-featherweight title
54	Win	47–5–2	José Luis Montes	TKO	8 (?)	1998-11-06	Joe Louis Arena, Detroit, Michigan, U.S.	
53	Loss	46–5–2	Dennis Holbaek Pedersen	UD	12 (12)	1998-09-04	Kolding Hallen, Kolding, Denmark	
52	Win	46–4–2	Javier Díaz	UD	10 (10)	1998-04-30	The Chili Pepper, Fort Lauderdale, Florida, U.S.	
51	Loss	45–4–2	Santos Rebolledo	MD	10 (10)	1998-02-21	Miccosukee Resort & Gaming, Miami, Florida, U.S.	
50	Win	45–3–2	Vincent Howard	UD	10 (10)	1997-07-19	Arena, Nashville, Tennessee, U.S.	
49	Loss	44–3–2	Naseem Hamed	TKO	8 (12)	1997-02-08	London Arena, London, England, U.K.	Lost IBF featherweight title; for WBO featherweight title
48	Draw	44–2–2	Javier Marquez	TD	3 (10)	1996-12-21	The Aladdin, Paradise, Nevada, U.S.	
47	Win	44–2–1	Ramon Guzman	UD	12 (12)	1996-08-31	Point Theatre, Dublin, Ireland	Retained IBF featherweight title
46	Win	43–2–1	Claudio Victor Martinet	KO	7 (12)	1996-04-27	Espace Piscine, Antibes, France	Retained IBF featherweight title
45	Win	42–2–1	Ever Beleno	TKO	12 (12)	1996-03-02	Telewest Arena, Newcastle upon Tyne, England, U.K.	Retained IBF featherweight title
44	Win	41–2–1	Jose Badillo	MD	12 (12)	1995-12-09	Hanns-Martin-Schleyer-Halle, Stuttgart, Germany	Retained IBF featherweight title
43	Win	40–2–1	Eddie Croft	UD	12 (12)	1995-05-28	Convention Center, South Padre Island, Texas, U.S.	Retained IBF featherweight title
42	Win	39–2–1	Victor Laureano	TKO	2 (?)	1995-04-26	The Palace, Auburn Hills, Michigan, U.S.	
41	Win	38–2–1	Manuel Medina	UD	12 (12)	1995-01-28	Bally's Park Place, Atlantic City, New Jersey, U.S.	Retained IBF featherweight title
40	Win	37–2–1	Francisco Segura	UD	12 (12)	1994-10-22	Bally's Park Place, Atlantic City, New Jersey, U.S.	Retained IBF featherweight title
39	Win	36–2–1	Benny Amparo	TKO	12 (12)	1994-06-11	Bally's Park Place, Atlantic City, New Jersey, U.S.	Retained IBF featherweight title
38	Win	35–2–1	Orlando Soto	UD	12 (12)	1994-02-12	Cervantes Center, St. Louis, Missouri, U.S.	Retained IBF featherweight title
37	Win	34–2–1	Stéphane Haccoun	TKO	9 (12)	1993-11-30	Palais des Sports, Marseille, France	Retained IBF featherweight title
36	Win	33–2–1	Sugar Baby Rojas	UD	12 (12)	1993-09-11	Jai Alai Fronton, Miami, Florida, U.S.	Retained IBF featherweight title
35	Win	32–2–1	José García	UD	10 (10)	1993-08-24	Resorts Casino Hotel, Atlantic City, New Jersey, U.S.	
34	Win	31–2–1	Manuel Medina	SD	12 (12)	1993-02-26	Salle de Fetes, Melun, France	Won IBF featherweight title
33	Win	30–2–1	Antonio Hernández	UD	10 (10)	1992-10-20	Resorts Casino Hotel, Atlantic City, New Jersey, U.S.	
32	Win	29–2–1	Kelvin Seabrooks	RTD	7 (10)	1992-06-10	Paramount Theatre, New York City, New York, U.S.	
31	Win	28–2–1	Mario Lozano	KO	1 (10)	1992-04-04	Eldorado High School, Eldorado, Illinois, U.S.	
30	Win	27–2–1	Rafael Ortega	TD	5 (10)	1992-01-21	Plaza Hotel & Casino, Las Vegas, Nevada, U.S.	
29	Loss	26–2–1	Manuel Medina	TD	9 (12)	1991-11-18	Great Western Forum, Inglewood, California, U.S.	For IBF featherweight title
28	Win	26–1–1	Gerardo Sanchez	TKO	2 (10)	1991-10-04	Resorts Casino Hotel, Atlantic City, New Jersey, U.S.	
27	Win	25–1–1	Arturo Padilla	KO	4 (10)	1991-08-03	Columbus Convention Center, Columbus, Ohio, U.S.	
26	Win	24–1–1	German Vasquez	TKO	1 (?)	1991-05-31	Kerhonkson, New York, U.S.	
25	Win	23–1–1	Jesse Sierra	TKO	5 (10)	1991-03-01	King Street Palace, Charleston, South Carolina, U.S.	
24	Win	22–1–1	Silvestre Castillo	TKO	4 (10)	1991-01-25	Memorial Coliseum, Corpus Christi, Texas, U.S.	
23	Draw	21–1–1	Troy Dorsey	MD	12 (12)	1990-11-18	Tarrant County Convention Center, Fort Worth, Texas, U.S.	For NABF featherweight title
22	Win	21–1	Gilberto Martínez	TKO	1 (10)	1990-10-23	The Aladdin, Paradise, Nevada, U.S.	
21	Loss	20–1	Harold Warren	SD	10 (10)	1990-07-03	Kutsher's Hotel, Monticello, New York, U.S.	
20	Win	20–0	Anthony English	UD	10 (10)	1990-01-26	Resorts Casino Hotel, Atlantic City, New Jersey, U.S.	
19	Win	19–0	Fermin Rodriguez	KO	7 (10)	1989-09-28	Civic Arena, St. Joseph, Missouri, U.S.	
18	Win	18–0	Fermin Rodriguez	TKO	6 (10)	1989-06-29	Felt Forum, New York City, New York, U.S.	
17	Win	17–0	Edgar Garcia	TKO	6 (12)	1989-04-21	Felt Forum, New York City, New York, U.S.	Retained WBC Continental Americas featherweight title
16	Win	16–0	Tony De La Rosa	TKO	3 (10)	1989-02-16	Premier Center, Sterling Heights, Michigan, U.S.	
15	Win	15–0	Gilberto Contreras	UD	12 (12)	1988-11-30	Cobo Arena, Detroit, Michigan, U.S.	Won vacant WBC Continental Americas featherweight title
14	Win	14–0	Carlos Castro	UD	10 (10)	1988-10-26	Thomas Crystal Gardens, Mount Clemens, Michigan, U.S.	
13	Win	13–0	Jose Saldana	TKO	9 (10)	1988-09-28	Thomas Crystal Gardens, Mount Clemens, Michigan, U.S.	
12	Win	12–0	Antonio Medina	TKO	4 (?)	1988-06-29	Premier Center, Sterling Heights, Michigan, U.S.	
11	Win	11–0	Ernesto Mota	KO	2 (?)	1988-04-27	Premier Center, Sterling Heights, Michigan, U.S.	
10	Win	10–0	Octavio Quinones	UD	6 (6)	1988-01-28	Premier Center, Sterling Heights, Michigan, U.S.	
9	Win	9–0	Kenny Cole	UD	8 (8)	1987-11-17	Premier Center, Sterling Heights, Michigan, U.S.	
8	Win	8–0	Troy Dorsey	SD	8 (8)	1987-09-29	Premier Center, Sterling Heights, Michigan, U.S.	
7	Win	7–0	Mario Rivera	TKO	2 (?)	1987-08-18	Premier Center, Sterling Heights, Michigan, U.S.	
6	Win	6–0	Vicente Gonzalez	UD	6 (6)	1987-05-19	Premier Center, Sterling Heights, Michigan, U.S.	
5	Win	5–0	Tony Cisneros	TKO	5 (6)	1987-04-28	Premier Center, Sterling Heights, Michigan, U.S.	
4	Win	4–0	Sammy Ruiz	UD	6 (6)	1987-02-24	Premier Center, Sterling Heights, Michigan, U.S.	
3	Win	3–0	Bobby Adams	TKO	3 (?)	1987-01-27	Premier Center, Sterling Heights, Michigan, U.S.	
2	Win	2–0	Victor Rogers	KO	1 (4)	1986-11-25	Premier Center, Sterling Heights, Michigan, U.S.	
1	Win	1–0	Aaron Brumfield	TKO	2 (4)	1986-10-28	Premier Center, Sterling Heights, Michigan, U.S.	

== Personal life ==
In his personal life, Johnson is partnered with Sandra Reeves Jackson (aka Lois Reeves) of the Motown group, Martha and the Vandellas

== See also ==
- List of world featherweight boxing champions

Sporting positions
Regional boxing titles
Vacant Title last held by Steve Cruz	WBC Continental Americas featherweight Champion; November 30, 1988 – 1989; Vacated	Vacant Title next held by Myron Taylor
World boxing titles
Preceded by Manuel Medina	IBF featherweight champion February 26, 1993 – February 8, 1997	Succeeded by Naseem Hamed
