= Héctor Lizárraga =

Mexican boxer (born 1966)

Hector Lizarraga
Personal information
- Nickname: Papi
- Born: September 1, 1966 (age 59) Mexico
- Height: 1.82 m (6 ft 0 in)
- Weight: Welterweight; Lightweight; Super featherweight Featherweight

Boxing career
- Reach: 189 cm (74 in)
- Stance: Orthodox

Boxing record
- Total fights: 55
- Wins: 38
- Win by KO: 21
- Losses: 12
- Draws: 5
- No contests: 0

Héctor Lizárraga (born September 1, 1966) is a Mexican former professional boxer who competed from 1985 to 2003. He held the IBF featherweight title from 1997 to 1998.

== Professional career ==
In April 1989 Hector won the WBC Continental Americas featherweight title by beating veteran Hugo Anguiano.

=== IBF featherweight title ===
On December 13, 1997 Lizarraga won the IBF featherweight title by defeating South Africa's Welcome Ncita.

== Personal life ==
He was married to Teresa and has four kids: Hector Jr, Esteban, Jesenia, and Eddie.

== See also ==
- List of Mexican boxing world champions
- List of IBF world champions
- List of world featherweight boxing champions

Achievements
Preceded by Naseem Hamed; Vacated	IBF Featherweight Champion; 13 December 1997– 24 April 1998	Succeeded by Manuel Medina
