= Cecilio Lastra =

Spanish boxer (1951–2025)

Personal information
- Nationality: Spanish
- Born: Cecilio Lastra; 12 August 1951 Santander, Spain
- Died: 23 September 2025 (aged 74) Santander, Spain
- Height: 5 ft 5 in (1.65 m)
- Weight: Featherweight

Boxing career
- Stance: Southpaw

Boxing record
- Total fights: 54
- Wins: 39
- Win by KO: 24
- Losses: 13
- Draws: 2
- No contests: 0

Cecilio Lastra (12 August 1951 – 23 September 2025) was a Spanish professional boxer. He fought 54 times between 1975 and 1982; winning 39 (24 by knockout), losing 13 and drawing 2. The highlight of Lastra's career came in 1977 when he won the WBA world featherweight title against Rafael Ortega. During his career he also became the Spanish champion and twice challenged for the EBU title.

== Professional career ==
Lastra made his professional debut at the age of 24, with a six round points victory against Juan Barros in December 1975. As with the majority of his early fights, the bout took place in his hometown of Santander. Lastra won the first twelve fights of his career, including six first round knockouts, before losing for the first time, in September 1976, against Carlos Hernandez. Following this defeat, Lastra won eight successive fights in Santander, before beating Isidoro Cabeza for the Spanish featherweight title. He suffered his first knockout defeat in August 1977, losing in the eleventh round against Roberto Castanon in his first title defence.

In December 1977 Lastra challenged Rafael Ortega for the WBA featherweight title in front of an estimated crowd of 6,300 in Santander. Ortega, a Panamanian who had won the title earlier in the year, was knocked down in the second round after a left jab to the nose. The champion rose from the canvas at the count of eight and lasted the full fifteen rounds. At the end of the contest the scorecards revealed a split decision in Lastra's favour. For the first defence of his title Lastra travelled to Panama City to fight Eusebio Pedroza in April 1978. The 22-year-old challenger knocked Lastra down three times en route to a thirteenth-round technical knockout victory.

Although Lastra never fought for a world title again, he twice challenged Roberto Castanon for the EBU title; losing their second fight on points and their third by a fourth round technical knockout, to go 0-3 versus Castanon. After four losses in a row, including two Spanish title fights, Lastra fought for a final time in July 1982, losing in the fifth round against Amalio Galan.

== Death ==
Lastra died in Santander on 23 September 2025, at the age of 74.

Achievements
Preceded by Rafael Ortega	WBA Featherweight Champion; 17 December 1977 – 15 April 1978	Succeeded by Eusebio Pedroza
