= Carlos Rios =

Argentine boxer

Personal information
- Nationality: Argentine
- Born: Carlos Alberto Ramon Rios 14 April 1971 (age 55)
- Height: 163 cm (5 ft 4 in)

Boxing career

Boxing record
- Total fights: 67
- Wins: 53
- Win by KO: 34
- Losses: 11
- Draws: 3

Carlos Alberto Ramon Rios (born 14 April 1971) is an Argentine professional boxer. He currently has 53 wins and 11 losses. Rios has fought in the super lightweight and featherweight divisions. Rios has fought for a world title on several occasions. In 1997, Rios fought Luisito Espinosa for the WBC featherweight title. He was defeated by TKO in the 6th round.

In 1999, Rios was defeated by Floyd Mayweather Jr. for the WBC super featherweight title. He later fought Acelino Freitas in 2000 for the WBO super featherweight title. The fight ended in a technical knockout after Rios's corner threw in the towel.

== Professional boxing record ==
53 wins (34 knockouts), 11 losses, 3 draws
Res.	Record	Opponent	Type	Rd., Time	Date	Location	Notes
Win	53-11-3	(Argentina) Rodolfo Sergio Javier Lauria	TKO	3 (8)	2014-08-16	Sauce Viejo, Santa Fe, Argentina	
Loss	52-11-3	(Argentina) Fabio Daniel Oliva	KO	2 (10)	2004-04-17	Club Atletico Union, Santa Fe, Santa Fe, Argentina	
Loss	52-10-3	(South Africa) Lovemore Ndou	KO	5 (12)	2003-12-05	Panthers World of Entertainment, Penrith, New South Wales, Australia	
Win	52-9-3	(Argentina) Roberto David Arrieta	TD	9 (10)	2003-10-17	Santa Rosa, La Pampa, Argentina	
Draw	51-9-3	(Mexico) Pablo Ramon Barbero	SD	8 (8)	2003-09-12	Villa Maria, Cordoba, Argentina	
Loss	51-9-2	(Argentina) Jorge Rodrigo Barrios	TD	6 (10)	2002-10-26	Estadio F.A.B., Buenos Aires, Distrito Federal, Argentina	
