= Rafael Ortega (boxer) =

Panamanian boxer (born 1950)

Personal information
- Nickname: El Brujo
- Nationality: (Panama) Panamanian
- Born: Rafael Ortega; September 25, 1950 (age 75) Panama
- Weight: Featherweight

Boxing career
- Stance: Orthodox

Boxing record
- Total fights: 31
- Wins: 22
- Win by KO: 6
- Losses: 4
- Draws: 5

Rafael Ortega (born September 25, 1950, in Panama) is a former professional boxer. The highlight of his career came in 1977, when he won the WBA World featherweight title.

== Professional career ==
Ortega began his professional career on January 24, 1970, in Colon City, Panama against Roberto Javier. The fight went the four round distance and Ortega was announced as the winner by unanimous decision. Ortega would fight for the first time outside of Panama on February 16, 1972, as he travelled to New York City, United States to face Fernando Jimenez. Ortega arrived in New York with an unbeaten record after 9 fights (including 4 draws) and further added to his wins with an eight-round decision victory. He went on to win two more bouts in New York and would also fight in El Salvador during his early career.

On December 15, 1973, Ortega challenged for his first title. The champion was Rigoberto Riasco, who held the Panamanian featherweight title. Riasco retained his title with a twelve-round unanimous decision and would later go on to win the WBC super bantamweight title. Over his next 7 fights Ortega compiled a record of 5 wins, 1 loss and 1 draw while fighting in Mexico, Venezuela and South Africa as well as Panama.

On January 15, 1977, Ortega fought Francisco Coronado for the vacant WBA featherweight title. After fifteen rounds the scorecards were revealed as: 146–143, 146-143 and 144-143—all in favour of Ortega who took the title by unanimous decision. For his first title defence Ortega travelled to Okinawa, Japan to face Flipper Uehara in his hometown. Ortega retained his title with another unanimous decision and in the process knocked Uehara down in the first and fourth rounds with left uppercuts.

For the next defence of his title Ortega travelled to Cantabria, Spain, which was the hometown of the challenger Cecilio Lastra. An estimated crowd of 6,300 saw Lastra knockdown Ortega in the third round with a solid left jab and win the title via split decision after dominating the fight. Ortega did not return to boxing until 1984 when he won a unanimous decision over Ernesto Arce. This was to be his last victory as, in his final fight, he lost to Virgilio Barrera by technical knockout on April 14, 1984.

Achievements
Vacant Title last held by Alexis Argüello	WBA Featherweight Champion; January 15, 1977 - December 17, 1977	Succeeded by Cecilio Lastra
