= Kevin Kelley (boxer) =

American boxer

Personal information
- Nickname: The Flushing Flash
- Born: Kevin Philip Kelley; June 29, 1967 (age 59) Brooklyn, New York City, New York, U.S.
- Weight: Featherweight; Super featherweight

Boxing career
- Stance: Southpaw

Boxing record
- Total fights: 72
- Wins: 60
- Win by KO: 39
- Losses: 10
- Draws: 2

Kevin Philip Kelley (born June 29, 1967) is an American former professional boxer who competed from 1988 to 2009, and held the WBC featherweight title from 1993 to 1995.

== Amateur career ==
Kelley won two New York Golden Gloves Championships as well as the 1985 119 lb Sub-Novice Championship and the 1986 119 lb Open Championship. In 1988 Kelley advanced to the finals of the 125 lb Open division and was to have met Fred Liberatore in the finals. Kelley was injured and could not fight. Liberatore was declared the Champion by Default-Injury.

In the Olympic box-offs he lost to Carl Daniels. His record was 70–5.

== Professional career ==
=== WBC featherweight champion ===
Known as the "Flushing Flash", Kelley held the WBC Featherweight title and defended it until he lost by TKO to, Mexican Alejandro Martín González, after Kelley failed to come out for the 11th round due to both eyes swollen shut. Kelley won the title by defeating Gregorio Vargas by unanimous decision in 1993.

Kelley was then signed to an HBO contract, and remained in title contention for the next decade. More known for being in big fights rather than gaining big victories, Kelley's resume includes TKO losses to boxing legends Prince Naseem Hamed and Marco Antonio Barrera and Erik Morales, both of which came during Kelley's career decline.

=== Loss to Hamed ===
Kelley's defeats include losses to Naseem Hamed. In 1997 Hamed flew to the United States to fight there for the first time. His ceremonious arrival on the British Airways Concorde was covered by multiple media outlets. There, he and former two-time WBC Featherweight champion of the world Kevin Kelley fought in Ring Magazine's fight of the year at the Madison Square Garden in New York. Despite being dropped three times himself, Hamed put Kelley down for a third and final time to win by a fourth-round knockout. This was his first of many fights on HBO. The fight was ranked 100th in Channel 4's 100 Greatest Sporting Moments in 2002.

Kelley knocked out former WBA featherweight champion Derrick Gainer in 1996, a loss which Gainer later avenged via unanimous decision in 1998.

=== Loss to Bobby Pacquiao ===
Kelley was then outclassed and KO'd by Bobby Pacquiao. On September 28, 2006, Kelley met Carlos Hernández in the ring. In an upset victory, Kelley put on his best performance in years, dropping Hernandez in the 4th round en route to a UD victory. Hernandez announced his retirement right after this fight.

Kelley was David Díaz's mandatory for the WBC Interim Lightweight Championship, but he lost a close decision to former titlist Manuel Medina.

== Life after boxing ==
Kelley now lives in Las Vegas, Nevada and is currently the co-host on "The Sucker Punch Show" alongside Colin Gates. This is a brand new show by SETAG Management Group. The Sucker Punch Show has interviewed some of the most iconic names in the sport of boxing: Roy Jones Jr, Errol Spence Jr, Andre Ward, Shawn Porter and many others.

While fighting, Kelley also moonlighted as a color commentator, most notably for HBO. Kelley was the lead on HBO's short lived KO Nation television show. The show served as a "hip hop" based boxing broadcast, and was hosted by Ed Lover.

== Professional boxing record ==
72 fights	60 wins	10 losses
By knockout	39	6
By decision	21	4
Draws	2	

No.	Result	Record	Opponent	Type	Round, time	Date	Location	Notes
72	Loss	60–10–2	Vicente Escobedo	TKO	2 (10), 1:53	May 21, 2009	ARCO Arena, Sacramento, California, U.S.	
71	Loss	60–9–2	David Rodela	SD	8	Oct 10, 2008	Desert Diamond Casino, Tucson, Arizona, U.S.	
70	Win	60–8–2	Jaime Palma	UD	10	Jul 8, 2008	Las Vegas Hilton, Winchester, Nevada, U.S.	
69	Loss	59–8–2	Manuel Medina	MD	12	Nov 11, 2006	Madison Square Garden, New York City, New York, U.S.	
68	Win	59–7–2	Carlos Hernández	UD	10	Sep 28, 2006	Municipal Auditorium, San Antonio, Texas, U.S.	
67	Loss	58–7–2	Bobby Pacquiao	KO	4 (12), 1:24	Jun 10, 2006	Madison Square Garden, New York City, New York, U.S.	For WBC Continental Americas super featherweight title
66	Win	58–6–2	Juan Carlos Ramírez	KO	2 (10), 2:29	Feb 17, 2006	Cicero Stadium, Cicero, Illinois, U.S.	
65	Win	57–6–2	Sandro Marcos	TKO	4 (10), 2:23	Nov 4, 2005	Ventura Theatre, Ventura, California, U.S.	
64	Win	56–6–2	Jose Reyes	UD	10	May 17, 2005	The Blue Horizon, Philadelphia, Pennsylvania, U.S.	
63	Win	55–6–2	Felix St Kitts	TKO	8 (8), 1:47	Mar 3, 2005	The Theater at Madison Square Garden, New York City, New York, U.S.	
62	Loss	54–6–2	Marco Antonio Barrera	TKO	4 (12), 1:32	Apr 12, 2003	MGM Grand Garden Arena, Paradise, Nevada, U.S.	For The Ring featherweight title
61	Win	54–5–2	Johnny West	KO	5 (10), 2:58	Nov 14, 2002	American Airlines Arena, Miami, Florida, U.S.	
60	Win	53–5–2	Humberto Soto	MD	12	Jul 13, 2002	The Aladdin, Paradise, Nevada, U.S.	Won vacant WBA–NABA super featherweight title
59	Win	52–5–2	Raul Franco	TKO	2 (10), 1:05	Apr 27, 2002	Stratosphere, Las Vegas, Nevada, U.S.	
58	Loss	51–5–2	Érik Morales	TKO	7 (12), 2:30	Sep 2, 2000	Don Haskins Center, El Paso, Texas, U.S.	For vacant WBC interim featherweight title
57	Win	51–4–2	Frankie Archuleta	KO	9 (10), 2:59	Jan 22, 2000	The Joint, Paradise, Nevada, U.S.	
56	Loss	50–4–2	Benito Rodriguez	UD	10	Aug 13, 1999	Bossier City, Louisiana, U.S.	
55	Win	50–3–2	Héctor Velázquez	UD	10	May 8, 1999	Las Vegas Hilton, Winchester, Nevada, U.S.	
54	Win	49–3–2	Jorge Ramirez	KO	9 (10)	Dec 17, 1998	Country Club, Reseda, California, U.S.	
53	Loss	48–3–2	Derrick Gainer	UD	10	Jul 18, 1998	The Theater at Madison Square Garden, New York City, New York, U.S.	
52	Win	48–2–2	Vincent Howard	UD	10	May 8, 1998	Trump Marina, Atlantic City, New Jersey, U.S.	
51	Loss	47–2–2	Naseem Hamed	KO	4 (12), 2:27	Dec 19, 1997	Madison Square Garden, New York City, New York, U.S.	For WBO featherweight title
50	Win	47–1–2	Orlando Fernandez	KO	10 (12), 0:15	Jul 12, 1997	Sam's Town Hotel and Gambling Hall, Sunrise Manor, Nevada, U.S.	Retained WBU featherweight title
49	Win	46–1–2	Jesus Salud	UD	12	Mar 14, 1997	Pepsi Arena, Albany, New York, U.S.	Retained WBU featherweight title
48	Win	45–1–2	Edwin Santana	UD	12	Nov 16, 1996	Bally's Park Place, Atlantic City, New Jersey, U.S.	Retained WBU featherweight title
47	Win	44–1–2	Derrick Gainer	KO	8 (12), 2:16	Jun 15, 1996	Veterans Memorial Coliseum, Jacksonville, Florida, U.S.	Retained WBU featherweight title
46	Win	43–1–2	Louie Espinoza	UD	12	Feb 2, 1996	Boulder Station Hotel Casino, Sunrise Manor, Nevada, U.S.	Won vacant WBU featherweight title
45	Draw	42–1–2	Clarence Adams	MD	12	Sep 9, 1995	Caesars Palace, Paradise, Nevada, U.S.	For vacant WBU featherweight title
44	Draw	42–1–1	Tommy Parks	TD	2 (10), 0:34	Jul 28, 1995	Casino Magic, Bay St. Louis, Mississippi, U.S.	
43	Win	42–1	Ricardo Rivera	TKO	9 (10), 1:15	Mar 31, 1995	Mountaineer Casino Racetrack and Resort, Chester, West Virginia, U.S.	
42	Loss	41–1	Alejandro González	RTD	10 (12), 3:00	Jan 7, 1995	Freeman Coliseum, San Antonio, Texas, U.S.	Lost WBC featherweight title
41	Win	41–0	Pete Taliaferro	TKO	10 (10)	Nov 2, 1994	Southern Belle Casino, Tunica, Mississippi, U.S.	
40	Win	40–0	Jose Vida Ramos	TKO	2 (12), 1:58	Sep 24, 1994	Bally's Park Place, Atlantic City, New Jersey, U.S.	Retained WBC featherweight title
39	Win	39–0	Georgie Navarro	TKO	6 (10), 0:56	Jun 26, 1994	Race Course, Atlantic City, New Jersey, U.S.	
38	Win	38–0	Jesse Benavides	UD	12	May 6, 1994	Convention Hall, Atlantic City, New Jersey, U.S.	Retained WBC featherweight title
37	Win	37–0	Gregorio Vargas	UD	12	Dec 4, 1993	Convention Center, Reno, Nevada, U.S.	Won WBC featherweight title
36	Win	36–0	Patrick Simeon	UD	10	Sep 11, 1993	Jai-Alai Fronton, Miami, Florida, U.S.	
35	Win	35–0	Adolfo Castillo	TKO	2 (10), 2:10	Jul 8, 1993	Paramount Theatre, New York City, New York, U.S.	
34	Win	34–0	Jesus Poll	TKO	6 (10), 2:10	May 13, 1993	Paramount Theatre, New York City, New York, U.S.	
33	Win	33–0	Angel Gonzalez	TKO	4 (10)	Mar 23, 1993	Ahoy, Rotterdam, Netherlands	
32	Win	32–0	Peter Nieves	TKO	6 (10), 2:03	Jan 12, 1993	Paramount Theatre, New York City, New York, U.S.	
31	Win	31–0	Roberto Villareal	KO	3 (10), 2:40	Sep 25, 1992	Friar Tuck Inn, Catskill, New York, U.S.	
30	Win	30–0	Antonio Hernandez	UD	10	Aug 20, 1992	Resorts Casino Hotel, Atlantic City, New Jersey, U.S.	
29	Win	29–0	Alric Johnson	PTS	10	Jun 2, 1992	Weenahal, Rotterdam, Netherlands	
28	Win	28–0	Tomas Valdez	TKO	2 (10), 0:31	May 21, 1992	Paramount Theatre, New York City, New York, U.S.	
27	Win	27–0	Troy Dorsey	UD	12	Feb 18, 1992	Paramount Theatre, New York City, New York, U.S.	Retained WBC Continental Americas featherweight title
26	Win	26–0	Hector Padilla	TKO	2 (10)	Jan 31, 1992	Waregem, Belgium	
25	Win	25–0	Rafael Zuñiga	TKO	4 (12), 1:37	Nov 12, 1991	Union Plaza Hotel and Casino, Las Vegas, Nevada, U.S.	Won vacant WBC Continental Americas featherweight title
24	Win	24–0	Cesar Almonte	KO	2 (10)	Oct 4, 1991	Waregem, Belgium	
23	Win	23–0	Juan Gomez Polo	TKO	2 (8)	Aug 31, 1991	Ergilio Hato Stadium, Willemstad, Curaçao	
22	Win	22–0	James Pipps	TKO	4 (10), 0:26	Jul 23, 1991	Kutsher's Hotel, Thompson, New York, U.S.	
21	Win	21–0	Job Walters	TKO	6 (10)	Jun 14, 1991	New York City, New York, U.S.	Won vacant New York featherweight title
20	Win	20–0	Richie Foster	KO	1	May 27, 1991	Weenahal, Rotterdam, Netherlands	
19	Win	19–0	Harold Warren	UD	10	Mar 22, 1991	Villa Roma Resort, Callicoon, New York, U.S.	
18	Win	18–0	Boualem Belkif	KO	3	Feb 12, 1991	Ahoy, Rotterdam, Netherlands	
17	Win	17–0	Ernesto Quintana	TKO	1 (10), 1:04	Nov 30, 1990	Sands Hotel and Casino, Paradise, Nevada, U.S.	
16	Win	16–0	Jesse Sierra	TKO	5 (8), 1:47	Oct 30, 1990	The Pines Hotel, Fallsburg, New York, U.S.	
15	Win	15–0	Cruz Saldana	KO	1 (8), 1:43	Sep 13, 1990	Pioneer Hall, Duluth, Minnesota, U.S.	
14	Win	14–0	Russell Davison	PTS	8	Dec 23, 1989	Sporthal Hoogvliet, Rotterdam, Netherlands	
13	Win	13–0	Martin Mendoza	KO	1	Nov 30, 1989	Trump Plaza Hotel and Casino, Atlantic City, New Jersey, U.S.	
12	Win	12–0	Fermin Rodriguez	KO	2	Nov 13, 1989	Houtrusthallen, The Hague, Netherlands	
11	Win	11–0	Jean Pierre Dibateza	PTS	8	Oct 30, 1989	Houtrusthallen, The Hague, Netherlands	
10	Win	10–0	Byron Chacon	TKO	1 (6), 2:01	Aug 24, 1989	Felt Forum, New York City, New York, U.S.	
9	Win	9–0	Jose Villasenor	KO	1, 0:55	Jul 27, 1989	Felt Forum, New York City, New York, U.S.	
8	Win	8–0	Bruce Flippins	TKO	4 (6)	May 25, 1989	Felt Forum, New York City, New York, U.S.	
7	Win	7–0	Anthony Barela	UD	6	May 5, 1989	Showboat, Atlantic City, New Jersey, U.S.	
6	Win	6–0	Anthony Barela	UD	6	Mar 3, 1989	Felt Forum, New York City, New York, U.S.	
5	Win	5–0	Carlos Peralta	KO	2 (4), 2:56	Feb 9, 1989	Felt Forum, New York City, New York, U.S.	
4	Win	4–0	Agustin Silva	TKO	4 (4), 2:38	Dec 15, 1988	Felt Forum, New York City, New York, U.S.	
3	Win	3–0	Joey King	PTS	4	Nov 10, 1988	Felt Forum, New York City, New York, U.S.	
2	Win	2–0	Vicente Arias	TKO	1 (4), 2:35	Oct 27, 1988	Felt Forum, New York City, New York, U.S.	
1	Win	1–0	Willie Barnes	TKO	2 (4)	Sep 8, 1988	Felt Forum, New York City, New York, U.S.	

Sporting positions
Regional boxing titles
Vacant Title last held by Tyrone Jackson	New York featherweight champion June 14, 1991 – 1997; Vacated	Vacant Title next held by Antonio Diaz
Vacant Title last held by Ricardo Cepeda	WBC Continental Americas featherweight champion November 12, 1991 – August 1993; Vacated	Vacant Title next held by Pete Taliaferro
Vacant Title last held by Nate Campbell	WBA–NABA super featherweight champion July 13, 2002 – September 2002; Vacated	Vacant Title next held by Nate Campbell
Minor world boxing titles
Inaugural champion	WBU featherweight champion February 2, 1996 – December 1997; Vacated	Vacant Title next held by Cassius Baloyi
Major world boxing titles
Preceded by Gregorio Vargas	WBC featherweight champion December 4, 1993 – January 7, 1995	Succeeded by Alejandro González
