= Alejandro González (boxer) =

Mexican boxer (born 1973)

Personal information
- Nickname: La Cobrita
- Born: Alejandro Martín González; August 11, 1973 (age 53) Guadalajara, Jalisco, Mexico
- Height: 5 ft 8 in (173 cm)
- Weight: Featherweight; Lightweight

Boxing career
- Reach: 68 in (173 cm)
- Stance: Orthodox

Boxing record
- Total fights: 55
- Wins: 49
- Win by KO: 33
- Losses: 5
- Draws: 1

Alejandro Martín González (born August 11, 1973) is a Mexican former professional boxer who held the WBC featherweight and IBA lightweight titles. He was the father of Alejandro González Jr.

== Professional career ==
González made his professional debut on April 28, 1988 at the age of 14. In May 1992, he won the WBC International Featherweight Championship by Knocking out Paquito Openo. In his fourth defense of that regional title, he stopped future champion Luisito Espinosa. Four wins later, he defeated another future champion, Cesar Soto, in a WBC title eliminator bout, improving his record to 33-2-0.

=== WBC Featherweight Championship ===
On January 7, 1995, he won the WBC Featherweight Championship by upsetting an undefeated Kevin Kelley. In the tenth round Kelley's corner threw in the towel, after Alejandro had landed many heavy shots. He defended it for the first time against former champion Louie Espinoza by unanimous decision. Two months later he would have his second title defense against American Tony Green in Mashantucket, Connecticut. Alejandro won by ninth round T.K.O. He lost the title in his next fight to Manuel Medina by split decision in a closely contested bout. He attempted to recover the title against Luisito Espinosa, whom he had previously defeated, but was stopped in the fourth round.

=== IBA Lightweight Championship ===
On March 11, 2000 González would upset another undefeated American, Steve Forbes to win the IBA Lightweight Championship. Several wins later, he defeated future champion Orlando Salido by majority decision. He next lost to former champion Stevie Johnston by another majority decision. In his final career fight, he defeated John Brown, once again, by majority decision.

== Professional boxing record ==
55 fights	49 wins	5 losses
By knockout	33	2
By decision	16	3
Draws	1	

No.	Result	Record	Opponent	Type	Round, time	Date	Location	Notes
55	Win	49–5–1	John Brown	MD	10	2003-03-28	Performing Arts Center, Oxnard, California, U.S.	
54	Loss	48–5–1	Stevie Johnston	MD	12	Apr 20, 2002	MGM Grand Garden Arena, Las Vegas, Nevada, U.S.	
53	Win	48–4–1	Orlando Salido	MD	10	2001-12-02	Grand Victoria Casino, Elgin, Illinois, U.S.	
52	Win	47–4–1	Gerald Gray	TKO	5 (10)	2001-10-14	Soboba Casino, San Jacinto, California, U.S.	
51	Win	46–4–1	Juan Angel Macias	UD	10	2001-07-08	Stateline Casino, West Wendover, Utah, U.S.	
50	Draw	45–4–1	Antonio Ramirez	TD	10 (10)	2001-05-06	Celebrity Theatre, Phoenix, Arizona, U.S.	
49	Win	45–4	Adarryl Johnson	TKO	3 (12)	2000-12-17	Guadalajara, Jalisco, Mexico	Retained IBA lightweight title
48	Win	44–4	Omar Bernal	UD	10	2000-10-08	Plaza Hotel & Casino, Las Vegas, Nevada, U.S.	
47	Win	43–4	Harold Warren	TKO	11 (12)	2000-06-03	Blanca's Bazaar, Imperial Beach, California, U.S.	Retained IBA lightweight title
46	Win	42–4	Steve Forbes	MD	12	2000-03-11	Fantasy Springs Resort Casino, Indio, California, U.S.	Won IBA lightweight title
45	Win	41–4	Mauro Lucero	TKO	4 (12)	1999-12-04	Equestrian Center, El Paso, Texas, U.S.	Won IBA Continental lightweight title
44	Win	40–4	Edward Barrios	TKO	8 (10)	1999-09-25	Miccosukee Resort & Gaming, Miami, Florida, U.S.	
43	Win	39–4	Oscar Javier Garcia	KO	5 (8)	1999-07-10	Plaza de Toros Calafia, Mexicali, Baja California, Mexico	
42	Win	38–4	Oscar Delgado	TKO	3 (10)	1996-11-08	Ocotlan, Jalisco, Mexico	
41	Loss	37–4	Luisito Espinosa	KO	4 (12)	1996-03-01	Arena Coliseo, Guadalajara, Jalisco, Mexico	For WBC featherweight title
40	Loss	37–3	Manuel Medina	SD	12	1995-09-23	Convention Center, Sacramento, California, U.S.	Lost WBC featherweight title
39	Win	37–2	Tony Green	TKO	9 (12)	1995-06-02	Foxwoods Resort Casino, Ledyard, Connecticut, U.S.	Retained WBC featherweight title
38	Win	36–2	Louie Espinoza	UD	12	1995-03-31	Arrowhead Pond, Anaheim, California, U.S.	Retained WBC featherweight title
37	Win	35–2	Kevin Kelley	RTD	10 (12)	1995-01-07	Freeman Coliseum, San Antonio, Texas, U.S.	Won WBC featherweight title
36	Win	34–2	Eduardo Montes	TKO	3 (10)	1994-11-04	Guadalajara, Jalisco, Mexico	
35	Win	33–2	César Soto	SD	12	1994-08-06	Plaza De Toros Monumental, Ciudad Juarez, Chihuahua, Mexico	
34	Win	32–2	Jesus Saldana	KO	3 (10)	1994-05-27	Saltillo, Coahuila, Mexico	
33	Win	31–2	Jean Pierre Dibateza	RTD	3 (8)	1994-03-29	Palais des sports Marcel-Cerdan, Levallois-Perret, France	
32	Win	30–2	Tomas Valdez	KO	1 (10)	1993-12-17	Guadalajara, Jalisco, Mexico	
31	Win	29–2	Vicente Gonzalez	KO	2 (10)	1993-11-15	Great Western Forum, Inglewood, California, U.S.	
30	Win	28–2	Luisito Espinosa	KO	2 (12)	1993-08-13	Arena Coliseo, Guadalajara, Jalisco, Mexico	Retained WBC International featherweight title
29	Win	27–2	Edward Parker	TKO	4 (10)	1993-04-26	Plaza Monumental, Aguascalientes, Aguascalientes, Mexico	
28	Win	26–2	Hector Ulises Chong	UD	12	1993-03-11	Guadalajara, Jalisco, Mexico	Retained WBC International featherweight title
27	Win	25–2	Lupe Gutierrez	KO	2 (12)	1992-12-18	Guadalajara, Jalisco, Mexico	Retained WBC International featherweight title
26	Win	24–2	Antonio Hernandez	UD	10	1992-10-02	Guadalajara, Jalisco, Mexico	
25	Win	23–2	Claudio Victor Martinet	KO	2 (12)	1992-06-26	Guadalajara, Jalisco, Mexico	Retained WBC International featherweight
24	Win	22–2	Paquito Openo	KO	2 (12)	1992-05-15	Guadalajara, Jalisco, Mexico	Won WBC International featherweight title
23	Win	21–2	Harold Rhodes	TKO	8 (10)	1992-02-28	Arena Naucalpan, Naucalpan de Juárez, Mexico City, Mexico	
22	Win	20–2	Raul Martinez Mora	UD	10	1991-11-16	Mexico City, Distrito Federal, Mexico	
21	Win	19–2	Juan Carlos Ortigoza	UD	10	1991-09-07	Mexico City, Distrito Federal, Mexico	
20	Win	18–2	Israel Vega	TKO	5 (8)	1991-05-31	Guadalajara, Jalisco, Mexico	
19	Win	17–2	Vladimir Gallegos	UD	10	1991-05-04	Mexico City, Distrito Federal, Mexico	
18	Win	16–2	Juan Carlos Ortigoza	UD	10	1991-02-23	Mexico City, Distrito Federal, Mexico	
17	Win	15–2	Raul Gutierrez	TKO	1 (10)	1990-12-22	Acapulco, Guerrero, Mexico	
16	Win	14–2	Sergio Cornejo	KO	8 (8)	1990-10-05	Guadalajara, Jalisco, Mexico	
15	Win	13–2	Atanasio Villareal	TKO	5 (10)	1990-08-10	Guadalajara, Jalisco, Mexico	
14	Loss	12–2	Josefino Suarez	TKO	8 (10)	1990-05-25	Guadalajara, Jalisco, Mexico	
13	Win	12–1	Moises Urbina	TKO	1 (12)	1990-03-30	Guadalajara, Jalisco, Mexico	Won Sinaloa State bantamweight title
12	Win	11–1	Arturo Mujica	TKO	5 (10)	1990-03-02	Guadalajara, Jalisco, Mexico	
11	Win	10–1	Cesar Decena	TKO	4 (8)	1990-01-26	Guadalajara, Jalisco, Mexico	
10	Win	9–1	Alejandro Figueroa	KO	2 (8)	1989-12-08	Guadalajara, Jalisco, Mexico	
9	Win	8–1	Julian Huerta	KO	3 (8)	1989-11-03	Guadalajara, Jalisco, Mexico	
8	Win	7–1	Juan Lira	TKO	1 (6)	1989-09-29	Guadalajara, Jalisco, Mexico	
7	Win	6–1	Ruben Murillo	TKO	1 (6)	1989-08-18	Guadalajara, Jalisco, Mexico	
6	Win	5–1	Adolfo Castillo	UD	10	1989-06-16	Guadalajara, Jalisco, Mexico	
5	Win	4–1	Sergio Aguila	KO	5 (6)	1989-04-29	Guadalajara, Jalisco, Mexico	
4	Win	3–1	Isidro Martinez	KO	3 (6)	1988-09-25	Guadalajara, Jalisco, Mexico	
3	Loss	2–1	Juan Carlos Rodriguez	UD	6	1988-08-05	Guadalajara, Jalisco, Mexico	
2	Win	2–0	Rafael Orozco	UD	4	1988-06-24	Guadalajara, Jalisco, Mexico	
1	Win	1–0	Rogelio Fajardo	UD	4	1988-04-28	Guadalajara, Jalisco, Mexico	

== See also ==
- Notable boxing families
- List of Mexican boxing world champions
- List of world featherweight boxing champions

Sporting positions
Minor World boxing titles
Vacant Title last held by Jesse James Leija	IBA lightweight champion March 11, 2000 – 2000; Vacated	Vacant Title next held by Juan Lazcano
Major World boxing titles
Preceded by Kevin Kelley	WBC featherweight champion January 7, 1995 – September 23, 1995	Succeeded by Manuel Medina
