= Juan Carlos Ramírez =

Mexican boxer (born 1977)

Personal information
- Nickname: El Ranchero
- Born: Juan Carlos Ramírez; April 24, 1977 (age 49) San Pedro de las Colonias, Coahuila, Mexico
- Height: 1.79 m (5 ft 10 in)
- Weight: Lightweight; Super Featherweight; Featherweight; Super Bantamweight

Boxing career
- Reach: 183 cm (72 in)
- Stance: Orthodox

Boxing record
- Total fights: 46
- Wins: 37
- Win by KO: 16
- Losses: 9
- Draws: 0
- No contests: 0

Juan Carlos "Ranchero" Ramírez (born April 24, 1977) is a Mexican professional boxer. He is the former NABF featherweight and WBO Inter-Continental featherweight champion.

== Professional career ==
=== WBC Featherweight Championship ===
In August 1998, Ramírez dropped a technical decision to Luisito Espinosa. The bout was for the WBC Featherweight title and stopped due to an accidental headbutt.

=== WBC Super Bantamweight Championship ===
On May 8, 1999 Juan lost to WBC Super Bantamweight Champion, Érik Morales at the Las Vegas Hilton Hotel in Las Vegas, Nevada.
