= Luisito Espinosa =

Filipino actor and former boxer

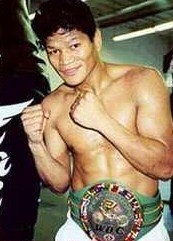

Personal information
- Nicknames: Lindol (Earthquake); Golden Boy
- Born: Luisito Pio Espinosa; June 26, 1967 (age 59) Tondo, Manila, Philippines
- Height: 5 ft 7 in (170 cm)
- Weight: Bantamweight; Featherweight; Super featherweight

Boxing career
- Reach: 69 in (175 cm)
- Stance: Orthodox

Boxing record
- Total fights: 60
- Wins: 47
- Win by KO: 26
- Losses: 13

Luisito Pio Espinosa (born June 26, 1967) is a Filipino actor and former professional boxer who competed from 1984 to 2005. He is a world champion in two weight classes, having held the World Boxing Association (WBA) bantamweight title from 1989 to 1991 and the World Boxing Council (WBC) featherweight title from 1995 to 1999.

== Professional career ==
Espinosa turned professional in 1984. In 1989, he won the WBA Bantamweight title by knocking out Kaokor Galaxy in the first round. He was then managed by famed boxing analyst and businessman Hermie Rivera. Espinosa defended the title twice before losing it to Israel Contreras by a fifth-round knockout in 1991.

Espinosa made an arduous climb back to the top, this time fighting under Joe Koizumi's stable. His comeback culminated in 1995, when he won the WBC Featherweight title by outpointing Manuel Medina. In his first title defense, Espinosa knocked out Alejandro "Cobrita" Gonzalez in the 4th round in Mexico. He then took on the hard-hitting body-puncher César Soto at Luneta (Rizal) Park in Manila and hammered out a well-deserved unanimous decision in front of his countrymen, which included no less than President Fidel V. Ramos. He defended the title seven times before losing the belt in 1999 to Soto who won by a controversial unanimous decision. The following year, he challenged Guty Espadas, Jr. for the Vacant WBC Featherweight Title, but was outboxed and lost a technical decision after their fight was stopped after a clash of heads.

== Retirement ==
Espinosa retired in 2005 after a public outcry for him to stop fighting after being knocked out by Cristóbal Cruz. He spent his retirement living in the Los Angeles and San Francisco areas.

== Post-boxing career ==
Due to some promotional and managerial disputes and divorce, Espinosa was left with little. He had to take jobs washing dishes, stocking shelves, flipping burgers and cleaning carpets in the US. Espinosa, who was out of the boxing scene for quite a while, entered the mixed martial arts (MMA) scene by training brothers Nick Diaz and Nate Diaz in boxing to improve their stand-up. He also assisted in the training of the University of San Francisco's Boxing team from 2006-2007 in preparation for the annual Hilltop Cup. After losing his job in the US he was invited to work in Hong Kong as a boxing trainer at the Everlast Fight and Fitness Gym and moved in November 2014. On June 16, 2015, after 17 years, he won a case for prize money that was owed to him his by the promoters of his WBC featherweight title defense against Argentine Carlos Rios. In 2017, he moved to the Everlast Gym as a boxing trainer in downtown Dalian city in mainland China.

When he returned to the Philippines, he was added as cast of FPJ's Batang Quiapo, as Roberto.

== Professional boxing record ==
60 fights	47 wins	13 losses
By knockout	26	7
By decision	21	6

No.	Result	Record	Opponent	Type	Round, time	Date	Location	Notes
60	Loss	47–13	Cristóbal Cruz	TKO	3 (10), 2:13	Feb 18, 2005	Memorial Civic Auditorium, Stockton, California, US	
59	Loss	47–12	Carlos Navarro	TKO	7 (10), 1:49	Jul 9, 2004	Reno Hilton Theater, Reno, Nevada, US	
58	Win	47–11	Marco Angel Pérez	TKO	1 (10), 2:57	May 27, 2003	Oakland Arena, Oakland, California, US	
57	Loss	46–11	Zahir Raheem	TKO	8 (10), 2:02	Oct 11, 2002	Creek Nation Gaming Center, Tulsa, Oklahoma, US	
56	Win	45–10	Ever Beleno	TKO	2 (10), 0:42	May 23, 2002	Compaq Center, San Jose, California, US	
55	Loss	44–10	Augie Sanchez	TKO	4 (10), 1:36	Jan 6, 2001	Texas Station Casino, Las Vegas, Nevada, Us	
54	Win	44–9	Ramon Aragon	RTD	4 (8), 3:00	Oct 20, 2000	The Palace, Auburn Hills, Michigan, US	
53	Loss	43–9	Guty Espadas Jr.	TD	11 (12), 2:40	Apr 14, 2000	Polyforum Zam Ná, Merida, Yucatán, Mexico	For vacant WBC featherweight title
52	Loss	43–8	César Soto	UD	12	May 15, 1999	Equestrian Center, El Paso, Texas, US	Lost WBC featherweight title
51	Win	43–7	Kennedy McKinney	TKO	2 (12), 0:47	Nov 28, 1998	Fantasy Springs Casino, Indio, California, US	Retained WBC featherweight title
50	Win	42–7	Juan Carlos Ramírez	TD	11 (12), 2:22	Aug 15, 1998	County Coliseum, El Paso, Texas, US	Retained WBC featherweight title
49	Win	41–7	Carlos Rios	TKO	6 (12), 1:12	Dec 6, 1997	South Cotabato Stadium, Koronadal City, Cotabato del Sur, Philippines	Retained WBC featherweight title
48	Win	40–7	Manuel Medina	TD	8 (12), 1:22	May 17, 1997	Luneta Park, Manila, Metro Manila, Philippines	Retained WBC featherweight title
47	Win	39–7	Nobutoshi Hiranaka	TKO	8 (12), 0:32	Nov 2, 1996	Marine Messe, Fukuoka, Fukuoka, Japan	Retained WBC featherweight title
46	Win	38–7	César Soto	UD	12	Jul 6, 1996	Luneta Park, Manila, Metro Manila, Philippines	Retained WBC featherweight title
45	Win	37–7	Alejandro González	TKO	4 (12), 1:12	Mar 1, 1996	Arena Coliseo, Guadalajara, Jalisco, Mexico	Retained WBC featherweight title
44	Win	36–7	Manuel Medina	UD	12	Dec 11, 1995	Korakuen Hall, Tokyo, Japan	Won WBC featherweight title
43	Win	35–7	Raúl Pérez	TKO	1 (10), 1:56	Oct 9, 1995	Korakuen Hall, Tokyo, Japan	
42	Win	34–7	Tomoaki Iwasa	TKO	7	Jul 30, 1995	Aichi Prefectural Gym, Nagoya, Aichi, Japan	
41	Win	33–7	Singnum Chuwatana	TKO	8 (10)	May 6, 1995	Korakuen Hall, Tokyo, Japan	
40	Win	32–7	Yong Heung-Nam	TKO	2	May 14, 1994	Araneta Center, Quezon City, Metro Manila, Philippines	
39	Loss	31–7	Alejandro González	TKO	2 (12), 2:51	Aug 13, 1993	Arena Coliseo, Guadalajara, Jalisco, Mexico	For WBC International featherweight title
38	Win	31–6	Boyet Andales	TKO	3 (10), 2:52	May 20, 1993	Cuneta Astrodome, Pasay City, Metro Manila, Philippines	
37	Win	30–6	Raul Mora	SD	12	Feb 20, 1993	Rizal Memorial Coliseum, Manila, Metro Manila, Philippines	
36	Win	29–6	Evgeny Burchak	UD	10	Nov 28, 1992	Rizal Memorial Coliseum, Manila, Metro Manila, Philippines	
35	Win	28–6	Thanomchit Kiatkriengkrai	KO	1 (10)	Sep 26, 1992	Ninoy Aquino Stadium, Manila, Metro Manila, Philippines	
34	Win	28–6	Eduardo Rojas	UD	10	Jul 17, 1992	Rizal Memorial Sports Complex, Manila, Metro Manila, Philippines	
33	Win	27–6	Rudy Cabiles	UD	10	Mar 14, 1992	Rizal Memorial Sports Complex, Manila, Metro Manila, Philippines	
32	Loss	26–6	Israel Contreras	KO	5 (12), 2:16	Oct 19, 1991	Araneta Coliseum, Quezon City, Metro Manila, Philippines	Lost WBA bantamweight title
31	Win	26–5	Thanomsak Sithbaobay	UD	12	Nov 29, 1990	Rajadamnern Stadium, Bangkok, Thailand	
30	Win	25–5	Jun Young-Man	TKO	1 (10),	Oct 12, 1990	Rizal Memorial Sports Complex, Manila, Metro Manila, Philippines	
29	Win	24–5	Hurley Snead	RTD	8 (12), 3:00	May 30, 1990	Rajadamnern Stadium, Bangkok, Thailand	Retained WBA bantamweight title
28	Win	23–5	Juan Mendoza	TKO	3 (10), 2:39	Dec 1, 1989	Cow Palace, Daly City, California, US	
27	Win	22–5	Kaokor Galaxy	KO	1 (12), 2:13	Oct 18, 1989	Rajadamnern Stadium, Bangkok, Thailand	Won WBA bantamweight title
26	Win	21–5	Keiichi Ozaki	UD	10	Aug 30, 1989	Blaisbell Center Arena, Honolulu, Hawaii, US	
25	Win	20–5	Park Young-Duk	TKO	2 (10), 2:50	Jun 28, 1989	Blaisbell Center Arena, Honolulu, Hawaii, US	
24	Win	19–5	Pedro Rodriguez	TKO	4 (10), 1:59	Apr 28, 1989	Blaisbell Center Arena, Honolulu, Hawaii, US	
23	Win	18–5	Somboonyod Singsamang	TKO	1 (10), 2:16	Feb 18, 1989	Ninoy Aquino Stadium, Manila, Metro Manila, Philippines	
22	Loss	17–5	Min Young-Chun	SD	10	Dec 4, 1988	Gwangju Gymnasium, Gwangju, South Korea	
21	Win	17–4	Mauro Diaz	KO	2 (12), 0:38	Jul 23, 1988	Concourse Exhibit Hall, San Francisco, California, US	Won USA California State bantamweight title
20	Win	16–4	Ron Cisneros	UD	10	May 20, 1988	Concourse Exhibit Hall, San Francisco, California, US	
19	Loss	15–4	Juan José Estrada	TKO	10 (12)	Mar 14, 1988	Tijuana, Baja California, Mexico	For WBC International bantamweight title
18	Win	15–3	Loremor Pontino	KO	3 (10), 1:44	Sep 27, 1987	Tagum City, Davao del Norte, Philippines	
17	Win	14–3	Dadoy Andujar	UD	10	Sep 5, 1987	Araneta Coliseum, Quezon City, Metro Manila, Philippines	
16	Win	13–3	Roger Pilapil	TKO	4 (10), 2:01	May 16, 1987	Rizal Memorial Sports Complex, Manila, Metro Manila, Philippines	
15	Win	12–3	Ruben De La Cruz	KO	9	Feb 7, 1987	Davao City, Davao del Sur, Philippines	
14	Win	11–3	Lee Bong-Ho	UD	10	Nov 8, 1986	Manila Midtown Ramada Hotel, Manila, Metro Manila, Philippines	
13	Win	10–3	Ari Blanca	PTS	10	Jun 25, 1986	Elorde Sports Center, Paranaque City, Metro Manila, Philippines	
12	Win	9–3	Robinson Cabusao	PTS	8	Mar 22, 1986	Quezon, Philippines	
11	Loss	8–3	Dadoy Andujar	SD	10	Feb 2, 1986	General Santos City, Cotabato del Sur, Philippines	
10	Loss	8–2	Jun Resma	PTS	10	Dec 6, 1985	Parañaque City, Metro Manila, Philippines	
9	Win	8–1	Romy Navarrete	PTS	10	Jul 19, 1985	University of Life Training & Recreational Arena (ULTRA), Pasig City, Metro Manila, Philippines	
8	Win	7–1	Roger Pilapil	UD	10	May 29, 1985	Elorde Sports Center, Paranaque City, Metro Manila, Philippines	
7	Win	6–1	Romy Austria	PTS	10	Mar 22, 1985	Araneta Coliseum, Quezon City, Metro Manila, Philippines	
6	Win	5–1	Titong Dignos	PTS	6	Nov 16, 1984	Araneta Coliseum, Quezon City, Metro Manila, Philippines	
5	Win	4–1	Danny Duran	TKO	2 (6)	Sep 22, 1984	Pasay City Sports Complex, Pasay City, Metro Manila, Philippines	
4	Win	3–1	Manuel Corpus	KO	3 (6),	Sep 15, 1984	Pasay City Sports Complex, Pasay City, Metro Manila, Philippines	
3	Loss	2–1	Ariel Samson	PTS	6	Aug 17, 1984	Tayuman, Manila, Metro Manila, Philippines	
2	Win	2–0	Ric Santiago	PTS	4	Jul 29, 1984	Pasay City Sports Complex, Pasay City, Metro Manila, Philippines	
1	Win	1–0	Vladimer Raffy	PTS	4	May 25, 1984	San Pedro, Laguna, Philippines	

== Titles in boxing ==
=== Major world titles ===
- WBA bantamweight champion (118 lbs)
- WBC featherweight champion (126 lbs)

== Awards and recognition ==
- 2023 Gabriel "Flash" Elorde Memorial Boxing Awards Banquest of Champions "Ring Excellence Award"

== Filmography ==
=== Film ===
Year	Title	Role	Ref(s):
1997	Bagsik ng Kamao	David	

=== Television ===
Year	Title	Role	Notes	Ref(s):
2023–2024	Batang Quiapo	Roberto	Supporting cast	

== See also ==
- List of Filipino boxing world champions

Sporting positions
World boxing titles
Preceded by Khaokor Galaxy	WBA bantamweight champion October 18, 1989 – October 19, 1991	Succeeded by Israel Contreras
Preceded by Manuel Medina	WBC featherweight champion December 11, 1995 – May 15, 1999	Succeeded by Cesar Soto
