= Naseem Hamed vs. Manuel Calvo =

Boxing match

The Fresh Prince
- Date: 18 May 2002
- Venue: London Arena, Millwall, London, UK
- Title on the line: Vacant IBO featherweight title

Tale of the tape
Boxer	Naseem Hamed	Manuel Calvo
Nickname	Prince	
Hometown	Sheffield, South Yorkshire, UK	Madrid, Comunidad de Madrid, Spain
Pre-fight record	35–1 (31 KO)	33–4–1 (14 KO)
Age	28 years, 3 months	34 years, 10 months
Height	5 ft 4 in (163 cm)	5 ft 4 1/2 in (164 cm)
Weight	125 3/4 lb (57 kg)	125 1/2 lb (57 kg)
Style	Southpaw	Orthodox
Recognition	WBA; No. 4 Ranked Featherweight; WBC; No. 7 Ranked Featherweight	WBC; No. 5 Ranked Featherweight; Former EBU featherweight champion

Result
- Hamed wins via 12-round unanimous decision (120–110, 119–109, 119–109)

Naseem Hamed vs. Manuel Calvo, billed as The Fresh Prince, was a professional boxing match contested on 18 May 2002, for the vacant IBO featherweight championship. It was Hamed's last fight, and was watched by eleven million viewers in the United Kingdom.

== Background ==
Naseem Hamed had lost his previous fight to Marco Antonio Barrera, giving him first defeat in his professional career and ending his over five year reign as featherweight champion. As per the contract that was signed, Hamed had the option of facing Barrera in an immediate rematch and though he had expressed interest in his post-fight interview, he ultimately decided against it. Hamed eventually announced his intentions to face European featherweight champion Manuel Calvo, who was coming off arguably his biggest victory over former WBO featherweight champion Steve Robinson. However as Calvo was an unknown fighter in the United States, HBO, with whom Hamed had an exclusive contract allowing them to air his fights in the US, objected to Hamed's choice of opponent. Rather than relent as he had the previous year when HBO objected to a proposed Hamed–István Kovács bout, Hamed opted to sever ties with HBO. The fight was also met with several delays. Prior to their separation, HBO offered Hamed a fight to take place on September 8, 2001, but Hamed declined, opting to face Calvo on November 10, 2001 instead. However Hamed postponed the fight as a result of the September 11 attacks. The fight was next rescheduled for March 23, 2002, but a back injury suffered by Hamed during training caused the fight to be postponed again. The fight was then finally set for May 18, 2002.

== The fight ==
Coming off a 13-month hiatus, Hamed abandoned his usual aggressiveness for a slow, tactical approach. Though Hamed clearly outboxed Calvo, many of the fans who attended the fight booed. The fight went the full 12 rounds, with Hamed winning by lopsided scores on all three of the judges' scorecards. Two judges had Hamed winning 119–109, each giving Calvo only a single round, while the third had Hamed winning with a score of 120–110.

== Aftermath ==
Hamed blamed his lackluster performance on a hand injury he sustained in the second round.

In a post-fight interview with Ian Darke, Hamed assured a quick return to the ring, which ultimately never happened. For years, Hamed would not confirm whether he had retired or not and there were talks of several fights in the UK and in the US, including a potential fight with Michael Brodie.

In an interview for BBC Radio Sportsweek in 2009, Hamed said that his retirement was largely due to chronic problems with his hands, including multiple fractures as well as surgery.

== Fight card ==
Confirmed bouts:

Weight Class	Weight		vs.		Method	Round	Time	Notes
Featherweight	126 lb	Naseem Hamed	def.	Manuel Calvo	UD	12/12		^{Note 1}
Featherweight	126 lb	Michael Brodie	def.	Pastor Humberto Maurin	UD	12/12		^{Note 2}
Lightweight	135 lb	Colin Dunne (c)	def.	Wayne Rigby	RTD	10/12		^{Note 3}
Super Bantamweight	122 lb	Michael Hunter	def.	Mark Payne	PTS	8/8
Super Lightweight	140 lb	Colin Lynes	def.	Kevin Bennett	TKO	4/8

^Note 1 For IBO Featherweight title.
^Note 2 For WBF Featherweight title.
^Note 3 For WBU Lightweight title.

== Broadcasting ==
Country	Broadcaster
United Kingdom	Sky Sports

Preceded by vs. Marco Antonio Barrera	Naseem Hamed's bouts 18 May 2002	Retired
Preceded by vs. Steve Robinson	Manuel Calvo's bouts 18 May 2002	Succeeded by vs. Aneudis Cuevas Pena
