= Naseem Hamed vs. Paul Ingle =

Boxing match

The Unbeaten v. The Unbeatable
- Date: 10 April 1999
- Venue: Manchester Arena, Manchester
- Title(s) on the line: WBO and Lineal Featherweight Championship

Tale of the tape
Boxer	Naseem Hamed	Paul Ingle
Nickname	Prince	The Yorkshire Hunter
Hometown	Sheffield, South Yorkshire	Scarborough, North Yorkshire
Pre-fight record	31–0 (28 KO)	21–0 (15 KO)
Age	25 years, 1 month	26 years, 9 months
Height	5 ft 4 in (163 cm)	5 ft 5 in (165 cm)
Weight	126 lb (57 kg)	125 1/2 lb (57 kg)
Style	Southpaw	Orthodox
Recognition	WBO and Lineal; Featherweight Champion; The Ring; No. 1 Ranked Featherweight; The Ring No. 9 ranked pound-for-pound fighter	EBU featherweight champion

Result
- Hamed wins via 11th-round technical knockout

Naseem Hamed vs. Paul Ingle, billed as The Unbeaten v. The Unbeatable, was a professional boxing match contested on April 10, 1999 for the WBO and Lineal featherweight championships.

== Background ==
In his previous fight, WBO featherweight champion Naseem Hamed had defeated Irish contender Wayne McCullough by unanimous decision, increasing his record to 31–0, but ending his over 4-year knockout streak. Prior to the fight, Hamed began having trouble with his longtime trainer Brendan Ingle (unrelated to Paul Ingle) stemming from comments Ingle had made in his book "The Paddy and the Prince". Hamed decided to keep Ingle in his corner for the McCullough fight as an "advisor", but seemed to ignore and disregard Ingle's advice in between rounds. A little over a month after the fight, Hamed officially announced that he and Ingle had parted ways. The following month in January, Hamed also confirmed that he was splitting with his promoter Frank Warren after their contract had expired and would instead handle his own fight negotiations. Hamed then entered negotiations with the reigning European featherweight champion Paul Ingle, though Ingle initially passed on the offer in favor of a bout with former WBO featherweight champion Steve Robinson. However, Ingle had a change of heart and ultimately agreed to face Hamed instead of Robinson. In his first fight without Brendan Ingle, Hamed would enlist the training services of Emmanuel Steward, who was one of the most prominent trainers in boxing at the time, as well as Oscar Suarez, who had previously trained former WBC light middleweight champion Luis Santana.

== The fight ==
Paul Ingle and his promoter Frank Maloney refused to wait in the ring as Hamed made his lengthy entrance and instead retreated to the locker room area before returning once Hamed entered the arena. Three Hamed look-alikes were first deployed dancing like Hamed to Faith Evans's hit song "Love Like This" before the real Hamed entered the arena being driven in a convertible to Busta Rhymes' "Put Your Hands Where My Eyes Can See."

Hamed would control most of the fight and would score three knockdowns over Ingle, but for the second consecutive fight, he had trouble scoring an early knockout as he had in his previous fights. Hamed would get off to a fast start after knocking down Ingle in the first round after landing a left to Ingle's body and then following that with a left to the head. Hamed would continue to control the bout and Ingle would be forced to take a knee in the sixth for Hamed's second knockdown after Hamed landed another two-left combination to the head and body. Ingle would continue the fight and suddenly take control of the fight in the ninth round, landing several power punches and bloodying Hamed's nose and mouth. However, 30 seconds into the 11th round, Hamed would land a left hand to Ingle's head sending him down for the third time in the fight. Ingle would answer the count, but was on wobbly knees causing referee [Joe Cortez] to call the fight and award Hamed the knockout victory.

== Aftermath ==
Despite this first career loss, Ingle would receive another world title opportunity in his next fight, on 13 November 1999. He went on to defeat IBF featherweight champion Manuel Medina by unanimous decision.

== Undercard ==
Confirmed bouts:

== Broadcasting ==
Country	Broadcaster
United Kingdom	Sky Sports
United States	HBO

Preceded by vs. Wayne McCullough	Naseem Hamed's bouts 10 April 1999	Succeeded by vs. César Soto
Preceded by vs. Billy Hardy	Paul Ingle's bouts 10 April 1999	Succeeded by vs. Manuel Medina
