= Naseem Hamed vs. Augie Sanchez =

Boxing match

- Date: August 19, 2000
- Venue: Foxwoods Resort Casino, Ledyard, Connecticut, U.S.
- Title(s) on the line: WBO and lineal world featherweight titles

Tale of the tape
Boxer	Naseem Hamed	Augie Sanchez
Nickname	Prince	Kid Vegas
Hometown	Sheffield, South Yorkshire, UK	Las Vegas, Nevada, U.S.
Pre-fight record	34–0 (30 KO)	26–1 (23 KO)
Age	26 years, 6 months	22 years, 9 months
Height	5 ft 4 in (163 cm)	5 ft 5 in (165 cm)
Weight	126 lb (57 kg)	125 lb (57 kg)
Style	Southpaw	Orthodox
Recognition	WBO and Lineal; Featherweight Champion	WBO; No. 7 Ranked Featherweight

Result
- Hamed defeats Sanchez by 4th round TKO

Naseem Hamed vs. Augie Sanchez was a professional boxing match contested on August 19, 2000, for the WBO and lineal featherweight world championship. The bout took place at the Foxwoods Resort Casino in Ledyard, Connecticut.

== Background ==
WBO featherweight world champion Naseem Hamed and 22-year old prospect Augie Sanchez agreed to meet one another in June 2000 for an August title fight. After knocking out the reigning super bantamweight champion Vuyani Bungu in the fourth round earlier in the year, Hamed and his team began negotiations for Hamed's next title fight to be against a highly-rated fighter, with Érik Morales and Marco Antonio Barrera being in the forefront. Other names such as Johnny Tapia, Danny Romero and Freddie Norwood were also mentioned, but none were able to agree to a deal. Then-WBA super bantamweight champion Clarence emerged as the front-runner before Hamed ultimately chose to face the relatively unknown Sanchez. Sanchez had been a promising prospect, engaging in a rivalry in the amateurs with Floyd Mayweather Jr., having defeated him once in the 1996 pre-Olympic trials before losing twice to Mayweather which cost him a shot to make 1996 US Olympic boxing team.

Hamed, who in his previous fight had promised to tone down his extravagant ring entrances, entered the ring to Black Rob's hit single "Whoa!" bursting through a wall while accompanied by explosions, lasers and Arabic chanting. Sanchez, meanwhile, entered the ring to Elvis Presley's "Viva Las Vegas" while being accompanied by four Elvis impersonators.

== The Fight ==
The fight was an all-out war between Hamed and Sanchez, as both fighters traded power punches throughout the bout. After an uneventful first round, the action picked up in round 2 with Sanchez dropping Hamed with a right hand, though the referee bizarrely and controversially declared it a slip. At the end of the round, Sanchez landed 2-punch combination that almost sent Hamed down again, but Hamed was able to regain his footing and the two ended the round trading punches until the bell rang. The action continued early in the round 3 with Sanchez landing 2 right hands that bloodied Hamed's nose, though Hamed held onto the ropes to prevent regain his balance. Later in the round, Hamed landed a left hook that sent Sanchez to his knees, though the referee again incorrectly called that a slip as well. As the round ended Hamed began to score numerous power punches on an exhausted Sanchez and opened up a gash over Sanchez's eye. A minute into round 4, Hamed landed a left hand that again sent Sanchez stumbling into Hamed, as Sanchez hit the canvas, Hamed connected with a body shot, causing the referee to take away the potential knockdown and instead dock Hamed a point for the foul. With around 40 seconds left in the round, Hamed landed a brutal 4-punch combination that floored Sanchez, the referee immediately called the fight and awarded Hamed the victory by technical knockout. Sanchez remained on the canvas for several minutes and had had to be taken from the ring on a stretcher.

== Aftermath ==
The fight would mark the 15th and final title defense of Hamed's WBO featherweight championship. Initially, the WBO had mandated that Hamed meet its #1 contender in István Kovács, however HBO, which had exclusive rights to air Hamed's fights in the United States, was not satisfied with Hamed taking on a virtual unknown in Kovács and only guaranteed Hamed a third of his usual purse of $6 million. Rather than fight for less money and in order to appease HBO, Hamed ultimately decided to voluntarily vacate the title. It was the third time that Hamed had to relinquish one of his titles outside the ring as earlier in 2000, the WBC stripped him after he declined to vacate his WBO version, and in 1997 the IBF stripped him as well. Though Hamed, no longer held a physical belt, he was still recognized as the "lineal" champion.

Immediately after giving up his title, Hamed challenged reigning WBO super bantamweight champion Marco Antonio Barrera to match the following year. After months of negotiations, the fight was agreed upon in January 2001.

== Fight card ==
Confirmed bouts:

Weight Class	Weight		vs.		Method	Round	Time	Notes
Featherweight	126 lbs.	Naseem Hamed (c)	def.	Augie Sanchez	TKO	4/12		^{Note 1}
Welterweight	147 lbs.	Antonio Díaz	def.	Micky Ward	UD	10/10
Super Featherweight	130 lbs.	Agapito Sánchez	def.	Juan Carlos Ramírez	UD	10/10
Lightweight	135 lbs.	Elizabeth Mueller	def.	Jane Couch	UD	6/6
Heavyweight	200+ lbs.	Albert Sosnowski	def.	Dan Conway	UD	4/4

^Note 1 For WBO Featherweight title.

== Broadcasting ==
Country	Broadcaster
Australia	Main Event
United Kingdom	Sky Sports
United States	HBO

Preceded by vs. Vuyani Bungu	Naseem Hamed's bouts 19 August 2000	Succeeded by vs. Marco Antonio Barrera
Preceded by vs. Jorge Antonio Paredes	Augie Sanchez's bouts 19 August 2000	Succeeded by vs. Luisito Espinosa
