= Naseem Hamed =

British boxer (born 1974)

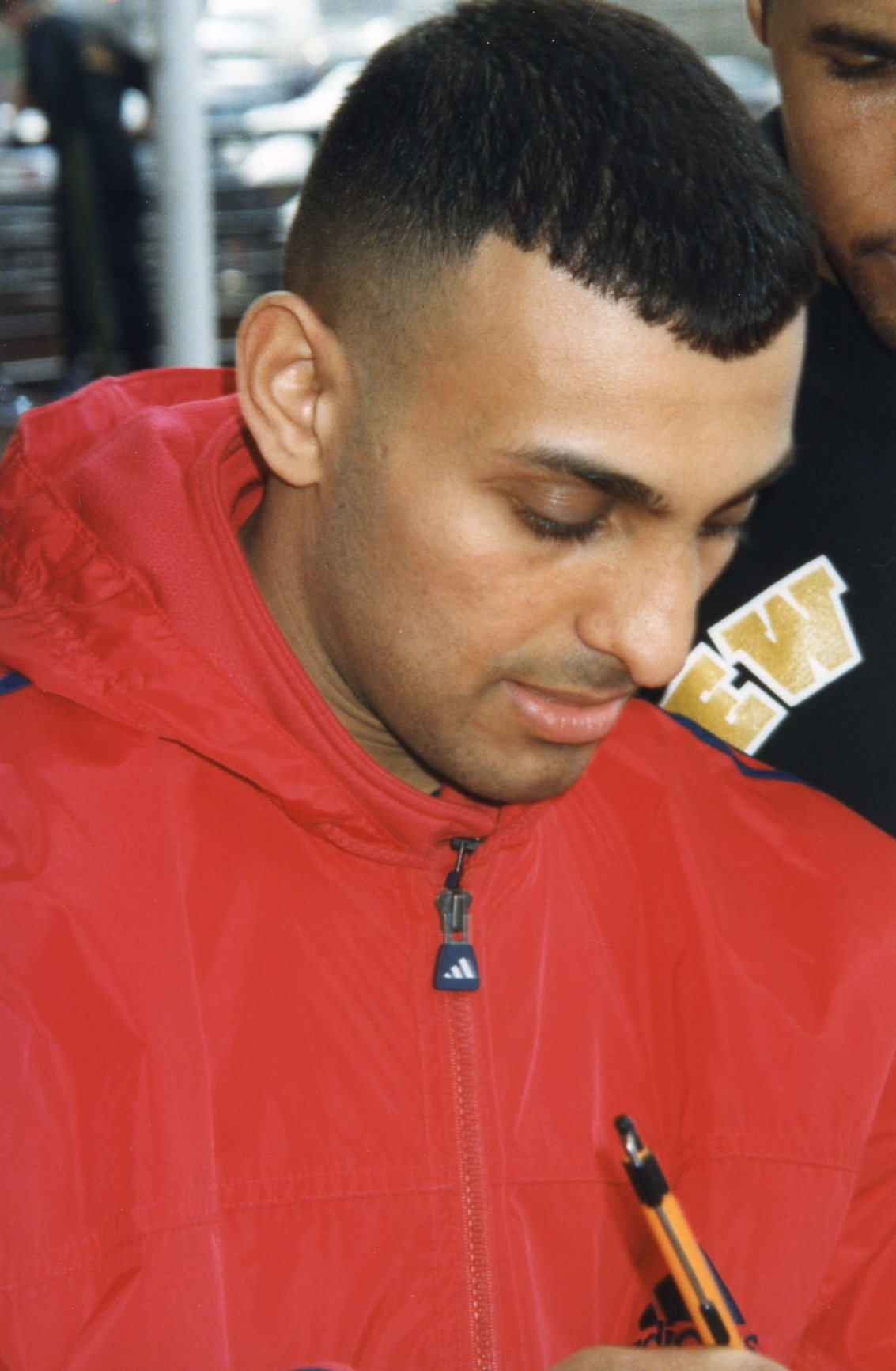
- Hamed in 1997

Personal information
- Nicknames: Prince Naseem; Naz
- Born: 12 February 1974 (age 52) Sheffield, South Yorkshire, England
- Height: 5 ft 4 in (163 cm)
- Weight: Bantamweight; Super bantamweight; Featherweight

Boxing career
- Reach: 63 in (160 cm)
- Stance: Southpaw

Boxing record
- Total fights: 37
- Wins: 36
- Win by KO: 31
- Losses: 1

Naseem "Naz" Hamed (Arabic: نسيم حميد; born 12 February 1974), nicknamed Prince Naseem, is a British former professional boxer who competed from 1992 to 2002. He held multiple featherweight world championships between 1995 and 2000, and reigned as lineal champion from 1998 to 2001. In 2015, he was inducted into the International Boxing Hall of Fame. The Ring magazine retroactively awarded Hamed their featherweight title in 2019 to acknowledge his dominance of the division and the multiple champions he defeated. The Ring was not awarding titles from 1990 to 2001. He is the only former world champion in any division thus far to receive this honour.

Hamed made his professional debut in the flyweight division at the age of 18 in 1992. In 1994, he won the European bantamweight title and the vacant WBC International super-bantamweight title. A year later he won the WBO featherweight title when he beat Steve Robinson via TKO in the eighth round. In 1997, he won the IBF featherweight title when he beat Tom Johnson via TKO in the eighth round. In 1999, he won the WBC featherweight title when he beat César Soto. In 2001, he lost his undefeated record when he was defeated by Marco Antonio Barrera. He returned to the ring a year later, for what turned out to be his final boxing match, beating the European champion Manuel Calvo for the IBO featherweight title.

Hamed was known for his unconventional boxing antics and ring entrances, which included entering the ring on a flying carpet. He was also known for his front somersault over the top rope into the ring, his southpaw boxing style, and one-punch knockout power, having finished his career with a knockout-to-win percentage of 84%. With his cocky persona and high-profile bouts he was a prominent figure in 1990s British pop culture, while Sean Ingle in The Guardian writes, "in his prime, Hamed was a global superstar". A headliner on both sides of the Atlantic, Dan Rafael of ESPN writes, "one of the biggest stars in the sport, the guy sold out arenas before his opponent was even named." Hamed, who is of Yemeni heritage, is credited with inspiring British Asian involvement in boxing.

In 2006 Hamed was sentenced to 15 months' imprisonment and four years' disqualification from driving, for overtaking at 90 mph, colliding with another car, the driver of which was seriously injured, and leaving the scene. He was subsequently stripped of his MBE.

In 2016, ESPN ranked Hamed at number 22 on its list of the top 25 fighters, pound for pound, of the last 25 years. As of August 2025, BoxRec ranks Hamed as the tenth greatest British boxer of all time, pound for pound. World Boxing, a sister publication of The Ring, ranked Hamed the 11th greatest British boxer of all time, and Gareth A. Davies of The Daily Telegraph ranked him 10th. The Ring also ranked Hamed the 46th greatest puncher of all time.

== Early life ==
Hamed was born in February 1974 in Sheffield, South Yorkshire, England, to Yemeni parents in a shop owned by his father. He grew up with eight siblings. He attended Hinde House Comprehensive School. A protege of Brendan Ingle's Wincobank gym, his talent and flashy southpaw style marked him out from an early age.

== Professional career ==
=== Early career ===
Hamed started boxing professionally at flyweight in 1992. He soon began rising through the ranks as he knocked out a series of opponents in the opening rounds. At age 20, he won the European bantamweight title, comprehensively beating the beleaguered Vincenzo Belcastro over twelve rounds. After one defence he won the WBC International super bantamweight title in 1994, overwhelming Freddy Cruz in Sheffield, whom he severely punished and stopped in six rounds. Hamed's popularity grew, his unorthodox style winning a large fan base and his boxing antics generating a large group of detractors. After signing for Frank Warren, Hamed, employing more spectacular entrances, knocked out better opposition in Enrique Angeles and Juan Polo Pérez, both within two rounds.

=== WBO featherweight champion ===
==== Hamed vs. Robinson ====
Later in 1995, after controversially being named the WBO #1 featherweight contender (despite never having boxed at that weight), Hamed moved up to face Wales' defending WBO champion Steve Robinson. After dominating the bout and scoring a knockdown in round 5, Hamed won the title when the referee stopped the fight in round 8 after Robinson was caught with a left hook that dropped him spectacularly. The fight was held in front of Robinson's home crowd at the rugby ground, Cardiff Arms Park, with rain pouring down on the fighters and the ring. This was also the first bout where Hamed badly injured his hand, a problem that would continue for the rest of his career.

==== Hamed vs. Medina ====
Hamed's next defence was in Dublin against former two-time world featherweight title holder Manuel Medina. In an entertaining, tough contest for Hamed on the night, Medina won several rounds of the fight. After knocking Medina down heavily in round 2, Hamed struggled to finish the fight. Hamed eventually knocked Medina down another two times in the 9th round. Finally, at the end of round 11, Medina's corner withdrew him from the fight on the advice of the ringside doctor. Hamed revealed in his post-fight interview that he had fought with a heavy cold. Medina would go on to have many more tough title fights, remarkably winning versions of the featherweight world title another three times. Hamed's next opponent was the 27–0 Remigio Molina of Argentina, who was stopped in two rounds.

=== Unified featherweight champion ===
==== Hamed vs. Johnson ====
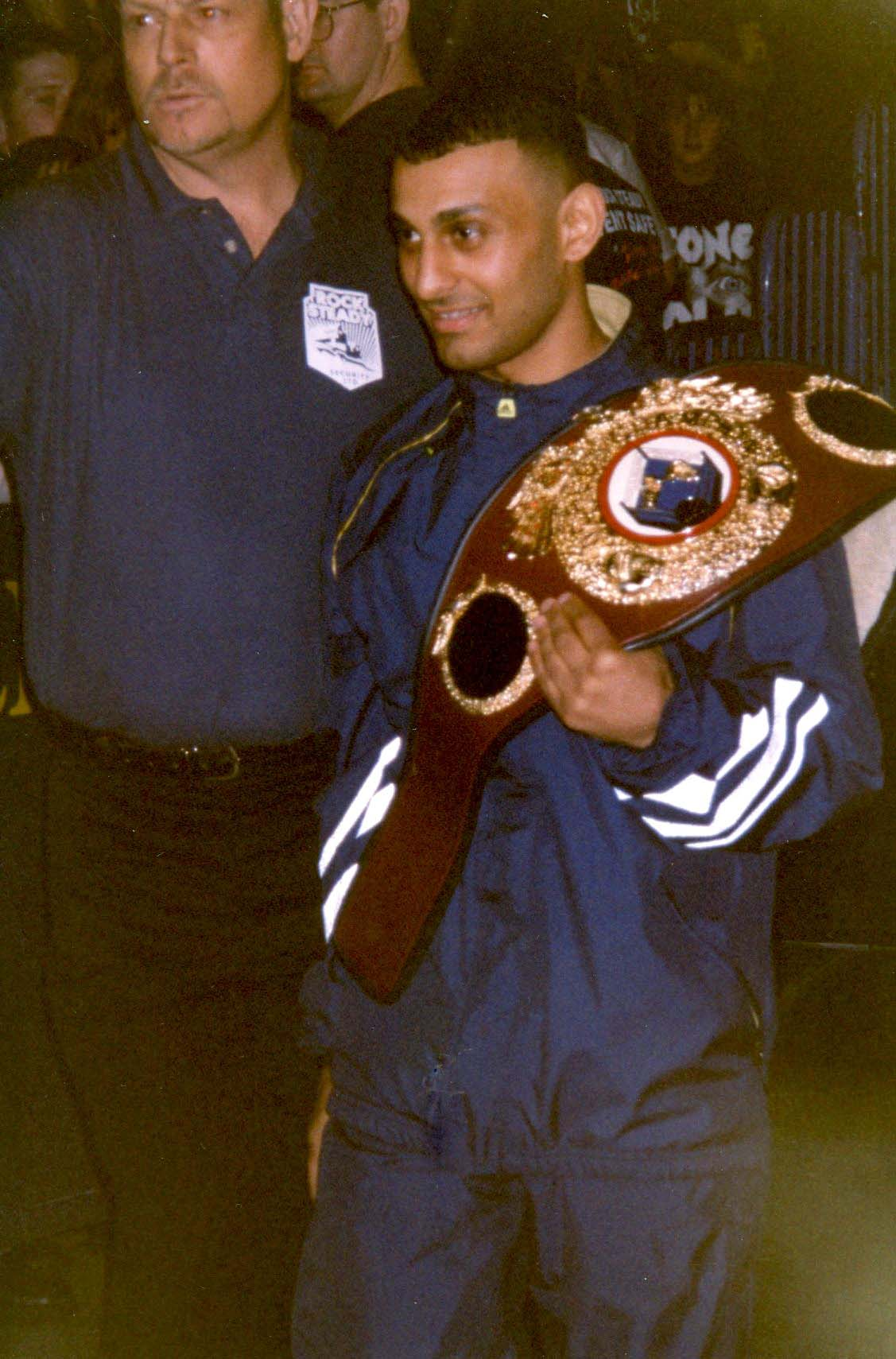
Hamed with the WBO featherweight title at a World Wrestling Federation event in Sheffield Arena, England, 1997

In February 1997, Hamed defeated long-time IBF champion Tom "Boom Boom" Johnson in eight rounds in a unification bout at the London Arena. After being constantly stunned and staggered from round 3 onwards, Johnson was finally dropped by a huge uppercut, then saved from further punishment by the referee. Hamed's first defence of both the WBO & IBF titles was a first-round KO of veteran British boxer and European champion Billy Hardy. Before the bout Hamed had correctly predicted he would win in round 1. The next defence was an easy two-round win against a hugely outclassed Juan Gerardo Cabrera. Due to boxing politics involving the IBF's mandatory challenger, Hamed was soon forced to relinquish the IBF title.

==== Hamed vs. Badillo ====
In Hamed's hometown of Sheffield in October 1997, he produced one of the best performances of his career in defending his WBO title against Jose Badillo, whose corner entered the ring to stop the fight during round 7. Hamed's status as one of the biggest draws in the sport was evident with a stellar undercard that included Joe Calzaghe vs. Chris Eubank for the world super middleweight title.

==== Hamed vs. Kelley ====
In late 1997 Hamed made his heavily hyped U.S. debut. His ceremonious arrival on the British Airways Concorde was covered by multiple media outlets. There, he and former WBC title holder Kevin Kelley fought in a highly entertaining bout at New York's Madison Square Garden. Prior to the fight, Kelley told Hamed, "I'm gonna smoke your boots". This fight marks something of a watershed in Hamed's career, as he was forced, for the first time, to abandon his hands-down style of fighting throughout the entire course of the bout, given the calibre of Kelley. Nonetheless, despite suffering three knockdowns himself, Hamed put Kelley down for a third and final time to win by a fourth-round knockout. This was his first of many fights on HBO. A 2002 Channel 4 poll in the UK saw his victory against Kelley listed among the 100 Greatest Sporting Moments.

==== Hamed vs. Vázquez, McCullough, Ingle ====
In 1998, Hamed enjoyed victories over former three-time WBA title holder and then-lineal champion Wilfredo Vazquez (TKO 7), former WBC bantamweight title holder Wayne McCullough (W 12), and future IBF title holder Paul Ingle (TKO 11; no relation to Hamed's then-former trainer Brendan Ingle).

==== Hamed vs. Soto ====
In October 1999 at Joe Louis Arena, Detroit, Michigan, United States, Hamed defeated WBC featherweight champion Cesar Soto of Mexico over 12 rounds, adding the WBC title to his collection and unified the WBC & WBO titles. Hamed soon chose to relinquish his WBC title due to his commitment to being WBO champion.

Had Vazquez not been stripped by the WBA of his belt (the WBA did not want their featherweight title unified with the WBO), Hamed would have had the distinction of winning all four world titles in a division, something only Riddick Bowe had achieved by that point, at heavyweight.

==== Hamed vs. Bungu ====
In March 2000 at Olympia, Kensington, London, Hamed knocked out former long-reigning IBF super bantamweight title holder, Vuyani Bungu of South Africa. The fight was ended with a single straight left hand, in one of Hamed's most impressive performances and biggest victories.

==== Hamed vs. Sanchez ====
Hamed fought in August 2000 against Augie Sanchez at Foxwoods Resort, Mashantucket, Connecticut, United States. Sanchez is known for being the last American to defeat Floyd Mayweather as an amateur boxer.

Hamed successfully retained his WBO title for the fifteenth and final time against Sanchez via a devastating fourth-round knockout. Hamed broke his hand badly in the bout, and following surgery he spent half a year out of the gym, gaining 35 pounds in weight. Rather than face the unknown EBU Champion & WBO mandatory challenger István Kovács, Hamed relinquished his WBO title to pave the way for a Superfight with Marco Antonio Barrera.

==== Hamed vs. Barrera ====
It is true Hamed looked awful that night. His body, drained from losing two stones in eight weeks, amateurishly tossing around like a marionette – head flying one way, legs flopping the other – as Barrera worked him over. But to judge Hamed on that performance is like judging Laurence Olivier on Inchon. Remember he defended the WBO world title 15 times and also held the WBC and IBF belts. His record of 36–1, with 31 knockouts, stands with the very best.

— Sean Ingle in The Guardian on Hamed's record

Eight weeks prior to the fight, which took place at the MGM Grand Garden Arena in Las Vegas on 7 April 2001, Marco Antonio Barrera prepared to fight. Barrera had moved up a weight division. At the end of training camp he was in the best shape of his life. According to Sky Sports, Barrera had "trained like a monk" in Big Bear, California, while Hamed trained in Bing Crosby's old house. Emanuel Steward had arrived to oversee the last two weeks of Hamed's training, including sparring, and was worried immediately. He had seen Barrera look razor sharp only a few months before in a stoppage win in Las Vegas, and watched Hamed not take his sparring with young Mexicans seriously.

Barrera handed Naseem Hamed his first and only loss for the lineal featherweight championship by a twelve-round decision. Before the fight, Hamed was a 3 to 1 betting favourite in Las Vegas. Hamed could not hit Barrera with his trademark lefts as Barrera circled to his left and worked both head and body. Barrera was not a fan of Hamed's antics and responded to Hamed's punches during clinches. On one occasion early in the fight, Hamed grabbed Barrera and they both fell to the ground where Barrera threw a right jab, leading to a warning from referee Joe Cortez. In the 12th and final round Barrera trapped Hamed in a full-nelson and forced his head into the turnbuckle, resulting in a point deducted by referee Joe Cortez. Ultimately, Barrera threw more, and harder, punches and more impressive combinations than Hamed throughout the course of the fight. Barrera was awarded the victory via a unanimous decision, with the scorecards reading 115–112, 115–112, 116–111 and won the lineal and IBO featherweight titles. The fight drew 310,000 pay-per-view buys on HBO. It was the highest-grossing featherweight bout ever in the United States.

=== IBO featherweight champion ===
==== Hamed vs. Calvo ====
On 18 May 2002 at London Arena, Docklands, London, Hamed returned to the ring for what turned out to be his final boxing match, against the European champion Manuel Calvo (33 wins, 4 losses, 1 draw) for the IBO World featherweight title. Hamed was booed by the 10,000 fans as he won unconvincingly on points after 12 rounds looking sluggish and uninterested. The judges scored the fight 120–110 and 119–109 (twice). In a post-fight interview with Ian Darke, Hamed assured a quick return to the ring, which ultimately never happened.

=== Retirement ===
Hamed was just 28 years old when he stopped fighting. For years, Hamed did not confirm whether he had retired or not; there were talks of several fights in the UK and in the US, including Hamed's brother and manager, Riath, speaking to HBO about a potential fight with Michael Brodie.

In an interview for BBC Radio Sportsweek, Hamed said that his retirement was largely due to chronic problems with his hands, including multiple fractures as well as surgery.

== Personal life ==
Hamed is a Muslim, and frequently recited the takbir out loud before his fights. Sean Ingle writes, "he was a proud Muslim who appealed to large chunks of working-class Britain. His last fight was watched by 11 million people on ITV."

In 1998, he married his girlfriend Eleasha Elphinstone, who had converted to Islam, in Sheffield.

By 1997, Hamed had an annual income of $14 million (£8,548,914) from fight purses and endorsements, ranking at number-22 on Forbes list of the world's highest-paid athletes for 1997. By March 1999, his net worth was an estimated £38 million. By January 2001, Hamed had reportedly amassed a fortune of £50 million ($75,746,700). He earned over $48.5 million from fight purses, including $8.5 million from his fight against Barrera. Hamed was the second richest British boxer, after heavyweight champion Lennox Lewis in 2003.

Hamed's two sons, Aadam and Sami, have been training to become professional boxers.

In 2023, it was announced that his younger brother, Ali, had died.

=== Driving offences ===
On 31 March 2006, Hamed pleaded guilty at Sheffield Crown Court of dangerous driving in relation to a collision at Ringinglow Road in Sheffield on 2 May 2005, in which his McLaren-Mercedes SLR crossed a solid white line overtaking a Ford Mondeo at a speed in excess of 90 mph and crashed head on into a Volkswagen Golf before hitting the Mondeo. The Golf driver, Anthony Burgin, had fractures to "every major bone" and bruising to the brain yet Hamed ran away from the crash. Burgin's wife was also seriously injured; Hamed was unhurt. On 12 May 2006, Hamed was sentenced to 15 months' imprisonment and 4 years' disqualification from driving, after the court heard he had been trying to impress his passenger, businessman Asif Ayub. The judge expressed astonishment that the Driver and Vehicle Licensing Agency had refused "apparently on human rights grounds" to disclose Hamed's four previous speeding offences, including a one-year ban for driving a Porsche at 110 mph on the M1 in Derbyshire.

Hamed left prison on 4 September 2006 after serving 16 weeks, and was placed under Home Detention Curfew for the remainder of his sentence, monitored by an electronic tag. After a recommendation from the Honours Forfeiture Committee, he was stripped of his MBE on 12 December 2006. At a jury trial in March 2008, Anthony Burgin was cleared of dangerous driving in relation to an incident on 19 April 2007 involving Hamed's wife Eleasha.

== Legacy and influence ==
Hamed was only 21 when he became the world champion by beating Steve Robinson in September 1995; two days later, Oasis released their album (What's the Story) Morning Glory? I always thought there was a neat symmetry between the two events. For while Hamed rode sidecar to the Cool Britannia era rather than sitting in the driver's seat, his attitude was a snug fit for the times: cocky and swaggering, impervious to self-doubt.

— Sean Ingle in The Guardian on Hamed's prominence in 1990s UK pop culture.

Hamed's boxing career was seen by many experts in the sport as one of massive potential. Frank Warren, the boxing promoter, once said of Hamed: "I think at one stage he was the most exciting fighter that I'd ever been involved with. At one stage, in the early part of his career, he could have gone on to become one of the great fighters. But that disappeared when he didn't fight as regularly as he should have done, when he was cutting corners on his training. It just didn't work out for him from that point on."

Moreover, commentators have pointed out that Hamed's ability should have propelled him to achievements that would have given him legendary status, but that his noted dislike of the long hard training camps and long periods away from his family hindered this.

As popular lower weight fighters like Oscar De La Hoya and Kostya Tszyu moved into the mid-weight classes and the Mexican champion Julio César Chávez declined, Hamed and Arturo Gatti filled the void. Hamed's boxing antics made him the new poster-boy for lighter-weight boxers and his charisma attracted a large number of fans. In 2002 the UK public voted Hamed's victory over Kevin Kelley on the list of the 100 Greatest Sporting Moments.

British boxing pundit Steve Bunce stated on 15 March 2008 edition of BBC panel show Fighting Talk that Hamed was the greatest British boxer of all time. World Boxing, a sister publication of The Ring magazine, ranked Hamed the 11th greatest British boxer of all time, while Gareth A. Davies, boxing correspondent of The Telegraph ranked him 10th. The Ring also ranked Hamed the 46th greatest puncher of all time.

Hamed was part of the 2015 class for the International Boxing Hall of Fame. In 2016, ESPN ranked Hamed at number 22 on its list of the top 25 pound-for-pound fighters of the last 25 years.

=== Cultural impact ===
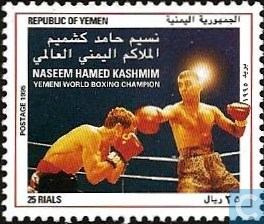
Of Yemeni descent, Hamed featured in a 1995 Yemen postage stamp

Hamed is considered one of the most successful and influential British fighters. UK sports commentator Steve Bunce called him the "most influential fighter of my 35 years in the British boxing business". According to boxing trainer Emanuel Steward, Hamed "opened the door" for British fighters as well as for boxers from lower weight divisions to earn significant prize money; his earnings were unprecedented for a featherweight. According to his boxing trainer nephew SugarHill Steward, Hamed's "flair and skill and confidence" inspired "a generation" and "gave fighters over here a massive opportunity, the confidence to crack the American market." HBO executive Lou DiBella compared his impact to that of Muhammad Ali, arguing that Hamed "changed boxing" and "redefined the fighter as a showman and an entertainer".

Hamed, who is of Yemeni heritage, is credited with inspiring British Asian involvement in boxing. He was a source of inspiration for a number of world champions in boxing and MMA, including Tyson Fury, Oleksandr Usyk, Conor McGregor, Israel Adesanya, Floyd Mayweather, Manny Pacquiao, Nonito Donaire, David Benavidez, Billy Joe Saunders, Amir Khan, Carl Froch, and David Haye. He also inspired a number of boxing trainers who have gone on to train world champions, including SugarHill Steward and Ben Davison.

Hamed was referenced by hip-hop artist Nas in the song "You Won't See Me Tonight", with the lyrics "I can't forget how I met you, you thought I was a boxer/ Prince Naseem, but I'm a mobster, Nas from Queens". Hamed himself recorded a song with hip hop group Kaliphz called "Walk Like a Champion", which reached number 23 in the UK Singles Chart in 1996.

Hamed had a licensed sports fighting game, Prince Naseem Boxing, published by Codemasters for the PlayStation console in 2000. A portable version of the game was also released for the Game Boy Color, developed by Virtucraft, which later in 2002 developed a Mike Tyson based follow-up, Mike Tyson Boxing, for the Game Boy Advance. Hamed also inspired a character called Prince Naseem in Squaresoft's fighting game Ehrgeiz, released in 1998. While called "Prince Naseem" in the original Japanese version, the character's name was changed to "Prince Doza" in the Western versions.

In the Japanese manga series Hajime no Ippo, the fictional American boxing champion Bryan Hawk is based on Naseem Hamed. In the Japanese manga series Batuque, the fictional character Shyun Amamiya is a fan of Hamed and takes inspiration from his fighting style. In the Tamil movie Sarpatta Parambarai (2021), the boxing style of fictional character Dancing Rose, played by Shabeer Kallarakkal, is based on Hamed.

A film based on Hamed and his relationship with trainer Brendan Ingle was announced in 2023 and released in 2025, starring Amir El-Masry as Hamed and Pierce Brosnan as Brendan Ingle. It was directed by Rowan Athale, with Sylvester Stallone as an executive producer. Mena Massoud and Paddy Considine were initially to star in the film.

== Professional boxing record ==
37 fights	36 wins	1 loss
By knockout	31	0
By decision	5	1

No.	Result	Record	Opponent	Type	Round, time	Date	Location	Notes
37	Win	36–1	Manuel Calvo	UD	12	18 May 2002	London Arena, London, England	Won vacant IBO featherweight title
36	Loss	35–1	Marco Antonio Barrera	UD	12	7 Apr 2001	MGM Grand Garden Arena, Paradise, Nevada, US	For vacant IBO featherweight title
35	Win	35–0	Augie Sanchez	TKO	4 (12), 2:34	19 Aug 2000	Foxwoods Resort Casino, Ledyard, Connecticut, US	Retained WBO featherweight title
34	Win	34–0	Vuyani Bungu	TKO	4 (12), 1:38	11 Mar 2000	London Olympia, London, England	Retained WBO featherweight title
33	Win	33–0	César Soto	UD	12	22 Oct 1999	Joe Louis Arena, Detroit, Michigan, US	Retained WBO featherweight title; Won WBC featherweight title
32	Win	32–0	Paul Ingle	TKO	11 (12), 0:45	10 Apr 1999	MEN Arena, Manchester, England	Retained WBO featherweight title
31	Win	31–0	Wayne McCullough	UD	12	31 Oct 1998	Bally's Park Place, Atlantic City, New Jersey, US	Retained WBO featherweight title
30	Win	30–0	Wilfredo Vázquez	TKO	7 (12), 2:29	18 Apr 1998	NYNEX Arena, Manchester, England	Retained WBO featherweight title
29	Win	29–0	Kevin Kelley	KO	4 (12), 2:27	19 Dec 1997	Madison Square Garden, New York City, New York, US	Retained WBO featherweight title
28	Win	28–0	Jose Badillo	TKO	7 (12), 1:37	11 Oct 1997	Sheffield Arena, Sheffield, England	Retained WBO featherweight title
27	Win	27–0	Juan Gerardo Cabrera	TKO	2 (12), 2:17	19 Jul 1997	Wembley Arena, London, England	Retained IBF and WBO featherweight titles
26	Win	26–0	Billy Hardy	TKO	1 (12), 1:33	3 May 1997	NYNEX Arena, Manchester, England	Retained IBF and WBO featherweight titles
25	Win	25–0	Tom Johnson	TKO	8 (12), 2:27	8 Feb 1997	London Arena, London, England	Retained WBO featherweight title; Won IBF featherweight title
24	Win	24–0	Remigio Molina	TKO	2 (12)	9 Nov 1996	NYNEX Arena, Manchester, England	Retained WBO featherweight title
23	Win	23–0	Manuel Medina	RTD	11 (12), 3:00	31 Aug 1996	Point Theatre, Dublin, Ireland	Retained WBO featherweight title
22	Win	22–0	Daniel Alicea	TKO	2 (12), 2:46	8 Jun 1996	Telewest Arena, Newcastle, England	Retained WBO featherweight title
21	Win	21–0	Said Lawal	KO	1 (12), 0:35	16 Mar 1996	Exhibition and Conference Centre, Glasgow, Scotland	Retained WBO featherweight title
20	Win	20–0	Steve Robinson	TKO	8 (12), 1:40	30 Sep 1995	Cardiff Arms Park, Cardiff, Wales	Won WBO featherweight title
19	Win	19–0	Juan Polo Perez	KO	2 (12), 2:00	1 Jul 1995	Royal Albert Hall, London, England	Retained WBC International super-bantamweight title
18	Win	18–0	Enrique Angeles	KO	2 (12)	6 May 1995	Royal Bath and West Showground, Shepton Mallet, England	Retained WBC International super-bantamweight title
17	Win	17–0	Sergio Rafael Liendo	KO	2 (12), 1:06	4 Mar 1995	Forum, Livingston, Scotland	Retained WBC International super-bantamweight title
16	Win	16–0	Armando Castro	KO	4 (12), 2:11	21 Jan 1995	Exhibition and Conference Centre, Glasgow, Scotland	Retained WBC International super-bantamweight title
15	Win	15–0	Laureano Ramírez	TKO	3 (12), 2:40	19 Nov 1994	National Ice Rink, Cardiff, Wales	Retained WBC International super-bantamweight title
14	Win	14–0	Freddy Cruz	TKO	6 (12), 2:03	12 Oct 1994	Ponds Forge, Sheffield, England	Won vacant WBC International super-bantamweight title
13	Win	13–0	Antonio Picardi	TKO	3 (12), 1:26	17 Aug 1994	Hillsborough Leisure Centre, Sheffield, England	Retained European bantamweight title
12	Win	12–0	Vincenzo Belcastro	UD	12	11 May 1994	Ponds Forge, Sheffield, England	Won European bantamweight title
11	Win	11–0	John Miceli	KO	1 (10), 2:50	9 Apr 1994	Leisure Centre, Mansfield, England	
10	Win	10–0	Peter Buckley	TKO	4 (8), 1:47	29 Jan 1994	National Ice Rink, Cardiff, Wales	
9	Win	9–0	Chris Clarkson	KO	2 (8), 1:50	24 Sep 1993	National Basketball Arena, Dublin, Ireland	
8	Win	8–0	Kevin Jenkins	TKO	3 (6), 1:58	26 May 1993	Leisure Centre, Mansfield, England, England	
7	Win	7–0	Alan Ley	KO	2 (6)	24 Feb 1993	Wembley Conference Centre, London, England	
6	Win	6–0	Peter Buckley	PTS	6	12 Nov 1992	Everton Park Sports Centre, Liverpool, England	
5	Win	5–0	Des Gargano	KO	4 (6)	7 Oct 1992	Crowtree Leisure Centre, Sunderland, England	
4	Win	4–0	Miguel Matthews	TKO	3 (6), 1:05	14 Jul 1992	Grosvenor House Hotel, London, England	
3	Win	3–0	Andrew Bloomer	TKO	2 (6), 0:46	23 May 1992	National Exhibition Centre, Birmingham, England	
2	Win	2–0	Shaun Norman	KO	2 (6), 0:55	25 Apr 1992	G-Mex Centre, Manchester, England	
1	Win	1–0	Ricky Beard	KO	2 (6), 2:36	14 Feb 1992	Leisure Centre, Mansfield, England	

== Viewership ==
=== International ===
Date	Fight	Network	Country	Viewers	Source(s)
21 January 1995	Naseem Hamed vs. Armando Castro	ITV	United Kingdom	6,400,000	
4 March 1995	Naseem Hamed vs. Sergio Rafael Liendo	ITV	United Kingdom	13,000,000	
19 July 1997	Naseem Hamed vs. Juan Gerardo Cabrera	Sky Sports	United Kingdom	831,000	
19 December 1997	Naseem Hamed vs. Kevin Kelley	HBO	United States	2,525,000	
2 May 1998	Naseem Hamed vs. Wilfredo Vázquez	HBO	United States	2,550,000	
31 October 1998	Naseem Hamed vs. Wayne McCullough	HBO	United States	3,200,000	
18 May 2002	Naseem Hamed vs. Manuel Calvo	Sky Sports	United Kingdom	11,000,000	
	Total known viewership		United Kingdom & United States	41,604,000	

=== Pay-per-view bouts ===
Naseem Hamed held the pay-per-view record in the United Kingdom up until he was surpassed by Lennox Lewis vs. Mike Tyson in 2002. (Note: See Pay-per-view § United Kingdom.)

Date	Fight	Billing	Network	Country	Buys	Revenue (est.)	Revenue (inflation) (est.)
9 November 1996	Naseem Hamed vs. Remigio Molina	Judgement Night	Sky Box Office	United Kingdom	420,000	£25,000,000 ($40,940,875)	£50,000,000 ($84,000,000)
8 February 1997	Naseem Hamed vs. Tom Johnson	Night of Champions	Sky Box Office	United Kingdom	720,000	£10,764,000 ($17,627,503)	£21,000,000 ($35,000,000)
3 May 1997	Naseem Hamed vs. Billy Hardy	Brit Pack	Sky Box Office	United Kingdom	348,000	£5,202,600 ($8,519,960)	£10,000,000 ($17,000,000)
19 August 2000	Naseem Hamed vs. Augie Sanchez	Hamed vs. Sanchez	Sky Box Office	United Kingdom	300,000	£4,485,000 ($6,795,455)	£9,000,000 ($13,000,000)
7 April 2001	Naseem Hamed vs. Marco Antonio Barrera	Playing With Fire	HBO	United States	310,000	$12,090,000 (£8,395,314)	$22,000,000 (£16,000,000)
	Total known sales				2,098,000	£57,541,600 ($82,279,107)	£94,000,000 ($127,000,000)

== See also ==
- List of world featherweight boxing champions
- List of WBC world champions
- List of IBF world champions
- List of WBO world champions
- List of IBO world champions
- List of European Boxing Union bantamweight champions

== Notes ==
Sporting positions
Regional boxing titles
Preceded by Vincenzo Belcastro	European bantamweight champion 11 May 1994 – April 1995; Vacated	Vacant Title next held by Johnny Armour
Vacant Title last held by Sergio Rafael Liendo	WBC International super-bantamweight champion 12 October 1994 – December 1995; Vacated	Vacant Title next held by Alfred Kotey
Minor world boxing titles
Vacant Title last held by Marco Antonio Barrera	IBO featherweight champion 18 May 2002 – June 2003; Vacated	Vacant Title next held by Michael Brodie
Major world boxing titles
Preceded by Steve Robinson	WBO featherweight champion 30 September 1995 – 5 October 2000; Vacated	Vacant Title next held by István Kovács
Preceded by Tom Johnson	IBF featherweight champion 8 February 1997 – 29 August 1997; Vacated	Vacant Title next held by Héctor Lizárraga
Preceded by César Soto	WBC featherweight champion 22 October 1999 – 9 January 2000; Vacated	Vacant Title next held by Guty Espadas Jr.
Honorary boxing titles
Retroactively awarded	The Ring featherweight champion 15 June 2019	Retroactively awarded
