= Naseem Hamed vs. Wayne McCullough =

Boxing match

Halloween Fright Night
- Date: October 31, 1998
- Venue: Boardwalk Hall, Atlantic City, New Jersey, U.S.
- Title(s) on the line: WBO and Lineal featherweight championship

Tale of the tape
Boxer	Naseem Hamed	Wayne McCullough
Nickname	Prince	The Pocket Rocket
Hometown	Sheffield, South Yorkshire, UK	Belfast, Northern Ireland, U.K.
Pre-fight record	30–0 (28 KO)	22–1 (14 KO)
Age	24 years, 8 months	28 years, 3 months
Height	5 ft 4 in (163 cm)	5 ft 7 in (170 cm)
Weight	125 lb (57 kg)	124 lb (56 kg)
Style	Southpaw	Orthodox
Recognition	WBO and Lineal; Featherweight Champion	Former super bantamweight champion

Result
- Hamed wins by unanimous decision (116–112, 117–111, 118–110)

Naseem Hamed vs. Wayne McCullough, billed as "Halloween Fright Night" was a professional boxing match contested on October 31, 1998 for the WBO and Lineal featherweight championship.

== Background ==
In April 1998, WBO featherweight champion Naseem Hamed had defeated 3-division world champion Wilfredo Vázquez to both retain his WBO belt and become the new lineal champion of the featherweight champion. For his next fight, Hamed would return to the United States for the second time in his career, having made his American debut the previous year in December against Kevin Kelley. Then-WBO super bantamweight champion Kennedy McKinney, with whom Hamed had originally agreed to face earlier in the year before instead taking the Vasquez fight, had emerged as a possible opponent for Hamed again, but was bypassed again in favor of Irish fighter Wayne McCullough. McCullough had captured a silver medal in the 1992 Olympics and had become the WBC bantamweight champion in 1995. He would then move up to the super bantamweight division to take on champion Daniel Zaragoza in a losing effort before once again moving up to the featherweight division to challenge Hamed. For Hamed, it was his third consecutive opponent to have been a world champion.

Prior to the bout, Hamed began having problems with his lifelong trainer Brendan Ingle stemming from unflattering comments Ingle had made about Hamed in Ingle's book "The Paddy and the Prince." Hamed lashed out at Ingle in an interview prior to the fight, labeling Ingle a "Judas" and claiming that he had "brainwashed" him. Despite the pre-fight tension, Ingle remained involved in Hamed's preparation for McCullough, though Ingle's two sons, John and Dominic handled the training and Ingle instead took a "supervisor" role for the fight.

== The fight ==
As the fight took place on Halloween night, Hamed made his entrance by walking through a set made to look like a graveyard (complete with smoke, sound effects, organ music, skeletons and confetti) while dancing to Michael Jackson's 1983 hit "Thriller."

Despite the fact that McCullough had neither been knocked down nor been defeated by a referee stoppage, Hamed, much like in his previous fight against Vasquez, predicted that he would do a "demolition job" on McCullough and obtain a knockout victory between the third and fifth rounds. However, Hamed came nowhere near scoring a knockdown over McCullough, and after failing to do hurt the iron-chinned McCullough in the early rounds, simply used his boxing skills to outpoint McCullough. Ultimately Hamed and McCullough went the full 12 rounds, with neither fighter scoring a knockdown. It was only the second time in Hamed's career that he went the full 12 rounds after having not done so since his twelfth professional fight in 1994 (his only other decision victory had come in a 6-round bout in 1992). The three judges all scored the fight in favor of Hamed with scores of 116–112, 117–111 and 118–110 giving Hamed the victory by unanimous decision, ending his 18–fight knockout streak.

== Aftermath ==
A little over a month after the fight, Hamed officially announced that he and Ingle had parted ways. The following month in January 1999, Hamed also confirmed that he was splitting with his promoter Frank Warren after his contract had expired.

== Undercard ==
Confirmed bouts:

== Broadcasting ==
Country	Broadcaster
United Kingdom	Sky Sports
United States	HBO

Preceded by vs. Wilfredo Vázquez	Naseem Hamed's bouts 31 October 1998	Succeeded by vs. Paul Ingle
Preceded by vs. Juan Polo Perez	Wayne McCullough's bouts 31 October 1998	Succeeded by vs. Len Martinez
