= Naseem Hamed vs. Marco Antonio Barrera =

Boxing match

Playing with Fire
- Date: April 7, 2001
- Venue: MGM Grand Garden Arena, Paradise, Nevada, U.S.
- Title(s) on the line: vacant IBO and Lineal featherweight titles

Tale of the tape
Boxer	Naseem Hamed	Marco Antonio Barrera
Nickname	"Prince"	"The Baby-Faced Assassin"
Hometown	Sheffield, South Yorkshire, UK	Mexico City, Distrito Federal, Mexico
Purse	$6,000,000	$2,000,000
Pre-fight record	35–0 (31 KO)	52–3 (40 KO)
Age	27 years, 1 month	27 years, 2 months
Height	5 ft 3 in (160 cm)	5 ft 7 in (170 cm)
Weight	126 lb (57 kg)	125 1/2 lb (57 kg)
Style	Southpaw	Orthodox
Recognition	Lineal; Featherweight Champion; WBA; No. 1 Ranked Featherweight; The Ring No. 6 ranked pound-for-pound fighter Former two time featherweight champion	WBO super bantamweight champion The Ring No. 9 ranked pound-for-pound fighter

Result
- Barrera wins via 12-round unanimous decision (115-112, 116-111, 115-112)

Naseem Hamed vs. Marco Antonio Barrera, billed as Playing with Fire, was a professional boxing match contested on April 7, 2001, for the lineal and IBO featherweight championship.

== Background ==
A fight between Naseem Hamed and Marco Antonio Barrera, which had been years in the making, was finally agreed upon in November 2000 for a March 3, 2001 date. 3 months prior, Hamed, who had held the WBO featherweight title for nearly five years and had successfully defended it 15 times, decided to vacate the title rather than take less money to face mandatory challenger István Kovács. However, as he had not lost in the ring, he was still regarded as the "lineal" champion. Barrera was the reigning WBO super bantamweight champion and was moving up to the featherweight division for the first time and, as a result, was instilled as a 3–1 underdog. In January, the planned March 3 date was scrapped and instead the fight was announced to be taken place on April 7 instead in order for both fighters to finalize their contracts. Hamed, who was making his American pay-per-view debut, was guaranteed a purse of $6 million while Barrera would earn $2 million.

== The fight ==
The usually aggressive Barrera changed his usual technique to combat the unorthodox Hamed, thoroughly outboxing Hamed throughout the contest. Barrera stood back for the entire fight, never charging towards Hamed in an effort to neutralize Hamed's powerful left-handed counter-punch. Hamed, who had not expected Barrera to take this approach, had trouble landing any offence as Barrera circled away and landed many counter-punches whenever Hamed attempted to engage him. In the 12th and final round, Barrera briefly abandoned his approach and began aggressively attacking Hamed before reverting to his previous tactic. Hamed, knowing he was behind on the scorecards, began swinging at Barrera wildly in hopes of scoring a knockout. During one such encounter, Hamed missed Barrera with a wild left hook leading to Barrera to lock Hamed into a full-nelson and drill his head into the turnbuckle, for which Barrera was deducted a point. However, the lost point would have no bearing on the result as Barrera would earn a unanimous decision victory with two scores of 115–112 and one score of 116–111. For Hamed, it was his first and only professional loss.

== Aftermath ==
After the bout, Hamed expressed interest in a rematch with Barrera, stating "I want Barrera again. I'm going to knock him out." Hamed held a rematch clause that he had to invoke within two months of this fight should he want to face Barrera in an immediate rematch. However, the two-month deadline came and went with no word from Hamed or his camp and Barrera moved on to face Enrique Sánchez instead. Hamed finally announced in February 2002 that he would face unknown Spanish fighter Manuel Calvo on March 23, though the bout was later pushed back to May 18. After over a year of inactivity Hamed would beat Calvo by unanimous decision in what would prove to be the final match of his career.

Barrera would vacate his newly won IBO featherweight title immediately following his victory. Initially his manager announced plans for Barrera to return to his previous weight division of super bantamweight and defend the WBO championship still in his possession, however Barrera ultimately decided to remain in the featherweight division, which he would remain until 2004.

== Undercard ==
Confirmed bouts:

== Broadcasting ==
Country	Broadcaster
Australia	Main Event
Mexico	Televisa
Philippines	RPN 9 (Via Satellite) / IBC 13 (Replay)
Thailand	Channel 3
United Kingdom	Sky Sports
United States	HBO

Preceded by vs. Augie Sanchez	Naseem Hamed's bouts 7 April 2001	Succeeded by vs. Manuel Calvo
Preceded by vs. Jesus Salud	Marco Antonio Barrera's bouts 7 April 2001	Succeeded by vs. Enrique Sánchez
