= Naseem Hamed vs. Wilfredo Vázquez =

Boxing competition

Back on Business
- Date: 18 April 1998
- Venue: Manchester Arena, Manchester, UK
- Title(s) on the line: WBO and Lineal Featherweight Championship

Tale of the tape
Boxer	(United Kingdom) Naseem Hamed	(Puerto Rico) Wilfredo Vázquez
Nickname	"Prince"	"The Pride of Puerto Rico"
Hometown	Sheffield, South Yorkshire, UK	Bayamón, San Juan, Puerto Rico
Pre-fight record	29–0 (27 KO)	50–7–2 (37 KO)
Age	24 years, 2 months	37 years, 8 months
Height	5 ft 4 in (163 cm)	5 ft 4 in (163 cm)
Weight	125 3/4 lb (57 kg)	126 lb (57 kg)
Style	Southpaw	Orthodox
Recognition	WBO; Featherweight Champion; The Ring; No. 1 Ranked Featherweight	Lineal; Featherweight Champion; The Ring; No. 3 Ranked Featherweight

Result
- Hamed defeated Vázquez by 7th round TKO

Naseem Hamed vs. Wilfredo Vázquez was a professional boxing match contested on 18 April 1998 for the WBO and Lineal featherweight championship.

== Background ==
In December of the previous year WBO featherweight champion Naseem Hamed had made his American debut after inking a 6-fight contract with cable giant HBO. Hamed had taken on one of his toughest opponents at the time in former WBC featherweight champion Kevin Kelley. In an action packed fight that HBO commentator Larry Merchant dubbed the Hagler–Hearns of the featherweight division, Hamed and Kelley each scored three knockdowns over one another with Hamed ultimately scoring the KO victory in the fourth round. In March 1998, it was announced that Hamed would return to his native England to face veteran 3-division world champion Wilfredo Vázquez of Puerto Rico. Vazquez had captured the WBA version of the featherweight title in 1996 and was recognized as the lineal champion of the division. Though Vazquez was supposed to make a mandatory title defense against WBA's number one contender Antonio Cermeño, Vazquez had hoped that the WBA would allow him to postpone his match with Cermeño and instead allow him to defend the title against Hamed, but the WBA instead opted to strip him of the title.

For Hamed's return to England, promoter Frank Warren organized a fight card that also included Chris Eubank moving up to the cruiserweight division to challenge Carl Thompson for the WBO cruiserweight championship and Herbie Hide defending his WBO heavyweight crown against Damon Reed. Steve Robinson was also originally scheduled to challenge Luisito Espinosa for the WBC featherweight title, but Espinosa pulled out of the bout after his father and trainer Egmedio suffered a heart attack prior to the fight.

== The fight ==
Prior to the fight, Hamed predicted that he would knock out Vázquez within 2 rounds, though his prediction would not come to be. Through the first two rounds, Hamed was the more active puncher as Vazquez took a more defensive approach and attempted to counter the highly unorthodox Hamed. As the first round came to a close, Hamed threw Vazquez to the canvas after he missed with a left hand and the resulting momentum caused Vazquez to go down. In the second round, Vazquez wobbled the champion after landing a hard right hook, but Hamed was able to quickly regain his composure. Hamed began to take control in round 3 as he was able to score his first knockdown of the fight. Vazquez landed a straight right to Hamed's head, but Hamed countered with a left hand that sent Vazquez down, though he was able to quickly get back up and continue the fight. After controlling both rounds 4 and 5, Hamed landed a straight left in the sixth that again put Vazquez down for the second time, but Vazquez was again able to continue. Shortly after, the referee momentarily stopped the bout as one of the ring ropes had come loose. After an over 5-minute delay in which the damaged rope had to be completely removed and in which Vazquez and Hamed exchanged words before Vazquez got into Hamed's face and headbutted him, the fight resumed. Despite the fact Vazquez was floored in round six, one judge (Paul Thomas) for some reason scored the round for him, 10-9. Early in round 7, Vazquez swung and missed Hamed with a right hook and Hamed countered with a strong left that put Vazquez down for the third time. Vazquez was clearly hurt from the exchange and Hamed dropped Vazquez again with another left. Vazquez again got back up but was swarmed by a barrage of punches by Hamed causing the referee to stop the fight and award Hamed the TKO victory at 2:29 of the seventh round.

== Aftermath ==
This was the most lucrative fight of Vázquez career, as he received $600,000 as payment. This fight would cause tension within his own family, who were informed by telephone of the results.

== Fight card ==
Confirmed bouts:

Weight Class	Weight		vs.		Method	Round	Time	Notes
Featherweight	126 lb	Naseem Hamed (c)	def.	Wilfredo Vázquez	TKO	7/12		^{Note 1}
Cruiserweight	190 lb	Carl Thompson (c)	def.	Chris Eubank	UD	12/12		^{Note 2}
Heavyweight	200+ lb	Herbie Hide (c)	def.	Damon Reed	KO	1/12		^{Note 3}
Welterweight	147 lb	Ricky Hatton	def.	Karl Taylor	TKO	1/6
Super welterweight	154 lb	Ensley Bingham	def.	Jim Rock	TKO	7/8

^Note 1 For WBO Featherweight title.
^Note 2 For WBO Cruiserweight title.
^Note 3 For WBO Heavyweight title.

== Broadcasting ==
Country	Broadcaster
United Kingdom	Sky Sports
United States	HBO

Preceded by vs. Kevin Kelley	Naseem Hamed's bouts 18 April 1998	Succeeded by vs. Wayne McCullough
Preceded by vs. Genaro Rios	Wilfredo Vázquez's bouts 18 April 1998	Succeeded by vs. Antonio Oscar Salas
