= Pat Dwyer =

Pat Dwyer may refer to:

- Patrick Dwyer (athlete) (born 1977), Australian athlete
- Patrick Dwyer (boxer) (1894–1948), Irish Olympic boxer
- Pat Dwyer (boxer, born 1946) (1946–2019), English boxer
- Patrick Dwyer (ice hockey) (born 1983), American ice hockey player
- Patrick Vincent Dwyer (1858–1931), Australian-born Roman Catholic bishop
- Pat Dwyer (American football) (1884–1939), American football coach
- Pat Dwyer (hurler), former Irish hurler
