= Naseem Hamed vs. Kevin Kelley =

Boxing match

Fists of Fire
- Date: December 19, 1997
- Venue: Madison Square Garden, New York City, New York, U.S.
- Title(s) on the line: WBO featherweight championship

Tale of the tape
Boxer	Naseem Hamed	Kevin Kelley
Nickname	Prince	The Flushing Flash
Hometown	Sheffield, South Yorkshire, U.K.	Queens, New York, U.S.
Purse	$2,000,000	$500,000
Pre-fight record	28–0 (26 KO)	47–1–2 (32 KO)
Age	23 years, 10 months	30 years, 5 months
Height	5 ft 4 in (163 cm)	5 ft 7 in (170 cm)
Weight	126 lb (57 kg)	125 1/2 lb (57 kg)
Style	Southpaw	Southpaw
Recognition	The Ring; No. 1 Ranked Featherweight; WBO; Featherweight Champion; Former featherweight champion	The Ring; No. 5 Ranked Featherweight; WBO; No. 3 Ranked Featherweight; WBU featherweight champion Former featherweight champion

Result
- Hamed wins via 4th-round knockout

Naseem Hamed vs. Kevin Kelley, billed as Fists of Fire, was a professional boxing match contested on December 19, 1997 for the WBO featherweight championship.

== Background ==
After defeating Jose Badillo in October 1997, it was announced that British sensation Naseem Hamed would make his long-awaited American debut just two months later to take former WBC featherweight champion Kevin Kelley. Hamed at the time was undefeated as a professional, sporting a 28–0 record and had become well regarded for his knockout power, with all but two of his fights having been won by way of knockout. Due to both his fighting style and flamboyant personality, Hamed had also quickly become one boxing's most popular fighters and had become the highest paid featherweight in the sport earning over $12 million in purses and endorsements the year prior and HBO, who was to air the bout on its World Championship Boxing program, had both signed Hamed to an exclusive six fight, $12 million contract to air his fights and spent $1 million on a publicity campaign to promote Hamed prior to his fight with Kelley. Kelley had lost the WBC featherweight title in early 1995 but had gone undefeated in 8 fights since and had picked up the less-regarded WBU version of the title in February 1996. Hamed angered Kelley, a New York native, with his trash-talk, claiming "I could have brought Kevin Kelley to my own backyard and beat him up there. But I didn't want to do that. I wanted to come to his own backyard and bring him down in front of his own crowd." Kelley responded "The first round I'm going straight for that mouth, I've been saving up everything for the bell."

Hamed, who was also known for his flashy ring entrances in his native England, made a lengthy entrance for his US debut where he danced behind a screen to Will Smith's "Men in Black" before entering the arena to Red Rat's "Shelly Ann" on a fashion runway while confetti rained down from the ceiling before finally entering the ring with his trademark flip over the ropes.

=== Fight purses ===
Guaranteed fight purses:

- Naseem Hamed ($2,000,000) vs. Kevin Kelley ($500,000)

== The fight ==
The fight would become an action packed slugfest as each fighter would score three knockdowns over one another. Hamed started the fight strongly landing more punches as Kelley struggled with Hamed's unorthodox fighting style. With a minute left in the round Hamed had backed Kelley into one of the corners, however Kelley was able to catch Hamed with a leaping right hook as Hamed stepped back to send him to mat for the fight's first knockdown. Hamed was quickly able to get back to his feet and escaped the round without any further damage. Kelley began round 2 as the aggressor and scored a second knockdown over Hamed after landing a left hook that dazed Hamed and made both gloves touch the canvas as Hamed attempted to hold himself up from going down. After Hamed took a standing 8 count, Kelley swarmed him in hopes of landing another knockdown and began swinging wildly as Hamed attempted to dodge his punches and side-stepped Kelley, causing Kelley to miss completely and fall to the canvas, though the referee ruled it a slip. Kelley would continue to chase the champion before Hamed countered with a straight right hand that sent Kelly down for Hamed's first knockdown of the fight. Kelly would also answer the standing 8 count and both fighters made it out of the round. After both fighters took a more cautious approach in round 3, the action would resume in the fourth round. About a minute and a half into the round Hamed landed two left hooks that sent Kelley down for the second time. Kelley again was able to continue, but Hamed continued to throw power punches at Kelley, but after Kelley countered with a right hook, Hamed's right glove again touched the canvas, officially giving Kelley his third knockdown of Hamed. After the fight resumed following the standing 8 count, Kelley looked to regain his momentum as he drove Hamed back, but Hamed would land a hard left that send Kelley down for the third time. Kelley was able to get back to his knees but was clearly hurt and could not get back to his feet as the referee reached the count of 10, giving Hamed the knockout victory at 2:27 of the fourth round.

== Aftermath ==
The fight was ranked 100th in Channel 4's 100 Greatest Sporting Moments in 2002.

=== Viewership ===
In the United States, the fight was watched by 2,525,000 viewers on HBO. It generated a 10.1 Nielsen rating among HBO's 25 million subscribers, significantly higher than HBO's 8.5 average boxing rating. In the United Kingdom, the fight was broadcast pay-per-view on Sky Box Office.

== Fight card ==
Confirmed bouts:

Weight Class	Weight		vs.		Method	Round	Time	Notes
Featherweight	126 lb	Naseem Hamed (c)	def.	Kevin Kelley	KO	4/12		^{Note 1}
Super bantamweight	122 lb	Kennedy McKinney	def.	Junior Jones (c)	TKO	4/12		^{Note 2}
Welterweight	147 lb	Michael Clark	def.	Roberto Nunez	KO	1/8
Heavyweight	200+ lb	Danny Williams	def.	Derek Amos	TKO	4/8
Welterweight	147 lb	Ricky Hatton	def.	Robbie Alvarez	UD	4/4
Light heavyweight	175 lb	David Telesco	def.	Napoleon Pitt	UD	6/6

^Note 1 For WBO Featherweight title.
^Note 2 For WBO Super Bantamweight title.

== Broadcasting ==
Country	Broadcaster
United Kingdom	Sky Sports
United States	HBO

Preceded by vs. Jose Badillo	Naseem Hamed's bouts 19 December 1997	Succeeded by vs. Wilfredo Vázquez
Preceded by vs. Orlando Fernandez	Kevin Kelley's bouts 19 December 1997	Succeeded by vs. Vincent Howard
