= Frank Peña =

American boxer

Francisco Peña
Personal information
- Nickname: Frank
- Born: Francisco Peña; August 22, 1971 Aurora, Colorado
- Died: March 9, 2000 (aged 28)
- Height: 5 ft 10 in (180 cm)
- Weight: Welterweight

Boxing career
- Reach: 73 in (185 cm)
- Stance: Counterpuncher

Boxing record
- Total fights: 20
- Wins: 15
- Win by KO: 8
- Losses: 3
- Draws: 2
- No contests: 0

Francisco Peña (August 22, 1971 – March 9, 2000) was an American professional boxer in the welterweight division. He was from Aurora, Colorado and was born into a Mexican American family.

== Amateur career ==
In 1989 Peña won the U.S. National Amateur Featherweight Championship, just a year later Oscar De La Hoya would win the title.

He also fought at the 1989 World Amateur Boxing Championships that were held in Moscow.

== Pro career ==
Pena had a record of 15 wins, 3 losses and 8 wins by knockout as a professional boxer. Among his victories, there was a 4 round split decision win over the before hand undefeated Norberto Bravo.
