= Neil Swain =

Welsh boxer

Personal information
- Nationality: Welsh
- Born: Neil Swain; 4 September 1971 (age 55) Gilfach Goch, Rhondda Cynon Taff, Wales
- Height: 5 ft 5 in (1.65 m)
- Weight: super fly/bantam/super bantam/featherweight

Boxing career
- Stance: Southpaw

Boxing record
- Total fights: 24
- Wins: 17 (KO 8)
- Losses: 7 (KO 3)

Neil Swain (born 4 September 1971, in Pontypridd) is a Welsh professional super fly/bantam/super bantam/featherweight boxer of the 1990s who won the Commonwealth super bantamweight title, and was a challenger for the British Boxing Board of Control (BBBofC) British super bantamweight title against Michael Brodie, his professional fighting weight varied from 113 lb (51 kg; 8 st 1 lb), i.e. super flyweight to 124 lb (56 kg; 8 st 12 lb), i.e. featherweight. Neil Swain is a Welsh Boxing Hall of Fame Inductee. Neil Swain was managed by Dai Gardner
