= List of United States national amateur boxing featherweight champions =

Below is a list of National Amateur Boxing Featherweight Champions, also known as United States Amateur Champions, along with the state or region which they represented. The weight class was contested at 125 pounds between 1889 and 1921. It was then contested at 126 pounds between 1922 and 1951, before returning to 125 pounds in 1952; which it is currently contested at. The United States National Boxing Championships bestow the title of United States Amateur Champion on amateur boxers for winning the annual national amateur boxing tournament organized by USA Boxing, the national governing body for Olympic boxing and is the United States' member organization of the International Amateur Boxing Association (AIBA). It is one of four premier amateur boxing tournaments, the others being the National Golden Gloves Tournament, which crowns its own amateur featherweight champion, the Police Athletic League Tournament, and the United States Armed Forces Tournament, all sending champions to the US Olympic Trials.

- 1889 - J. Brown, New York, New York (spring); J. Gorman, SAC (winter)
- 1890 - J. Schneering, New York, New York
- 1891 - W.H. Horton, Navy
- 1892 - Not held
- 1893 - W.H. Horton, Navy
- 1894 - C. Miner, CAC
- 1895 - L. Campbell, Pittsburgh, Pennsylvania
- 1896 - Not held
- 1897 - Joe McCann, Philadelphia, Pennsylvania
- 1898 - Not held
- 1899 - John Burns, New York, New York
- 1900 - John Scholes, Toronto, Ontario, Canada
- 1901 - John Scholes, Toronto, Ontario, Canada
- 1902 - Joe McCann, Philadelphia, Pennsylvania
- 1903 - J. McGarry, Mott Haven AC
- 1904 - T.J. Fitzpatrick, Boston, Massachusetts
- 1905 - Willie Cornell, Lowell, Massachusetts
- 1906 - W.J. Leonard, San Francisco, California
- 1907 - T.J. Fitzpatrick, Boston, Massachusetts
- 1908 - E.J. Walsh, New York, New York
- 1909 - T.J. Fitzpatrick, Boston, Massachusetts
- 1910 - Frank Smith, Boston, Massachusetts
- 1911 - Frank Hufnagie, Brooklyn, New York
- 1912 - John Cooper, Chelsea, Massachusetts
- 1913 - Walter Hitchen, Toronto, Ontario, Canada
- 1914 - V. Pokorni, Cleveland, Ohio
- 1915 - Art Strawhacker, Cleveland, Ohio
- 1916 - William Morris, New York, New York
- 1917 - Earl Baird, Seattle, Washington
- 1918 - James Fruzetti, Brockton, Massachusetts
- 1919 - W.P. Corbett, Somerville, Massachusetts
- 1920 - Solly Seeman, Brooklyn, New York
- 1921 - Dan Gartin, Philadelphia, Pennsylvania
- 1922 - George Fifield, Toronto, Ontario, Canada
- 1923 - Terry Parker, Boston, Massachusetts
- 1924 - Joe Salas, Los Angeles, California
- 1925 - Ray Alfano, St. Louis, Missouri
- 1926 - Patsy Rufalo, New York, New York
- 1927 - Christopher Battalino, Hartford, Connecticut
- 1928 - Harry Devine, Waltham, Massachusetts
- 1929 - Martin Zuniga, Los Angeles, California
- 1930 - Ray Meyers, New York, New York
- 1931 - Anthony Sarpati, New York, New York
- 1932 - Richard Carter, New York, New York
- 1933 - Louis Barisano, Boston, Massachusetts
- 1934 - Ed Waling, Highland Park, Michigan
- 1935 - Al Nettlow, River Rouge, Michigan
- 1936 - Joseph Church, Buffalo, New York
- 1937 - Ed Waling, Detroit, Michigan
- 1938 - Bill Eddy, Flint, Michigan
- 1939 - Bill Eddy, Flint, Michigan
- 1940 - Frank Robinson, Pittsburgh, Pennsylvania
- 1941 -
- 1942 -
- 1943 -
- 1944 - Major Jones, Kansas City, Missouri
- 1945 - Virgil Franklin, Oklahoma City, Oklahoma
- 1946 - Leo Kelly, Pittsburgh, Pennsylvania
- 1947 - Wallace (Bud) Smith, Cincinnati, Ohio
- 1948 - T. Fittipaldo, Warren, Ohio
- 1949 - Benny Apostadiro, Honolulu, Hawaii
- 1950 - Sammy Rodgers, Baltimore, Maryland
- 1951 - Len Walters, Vancouver, British Columbia, Canada
- 1952 - Mac Martinez, San Jose, California
- 1953 - Bob Tenequer, Lawton, Oklahoma
- 1954 - Stan Fitzgerald, Buffalo, New York
- 1955 - Joe Charles, Air Force
- 1956 - Jim Pettaway, Toledo, Ohio
- 1957 - Rubin Pizzarro, New York, New York
- 1958 - John Patrick Britt, Philadelphia, Pennsylvania
- 1959 - Roy Houpe, Columbus, Ohio
- 1960 - George Foster, Cincinnati, Ohio
- 1961 - Ralph Ungricht, Provo, Utah
- 1962 - Steve Freeman, Houston, Texas
- 1963 - Victor Baerga, New York, New York
- 1964 - Charles Smith, Air Force
- 1965 - Lawrence Hines, Philadelphia, Pennsylvania
- 1966 - R. Lozado, Camp Lejeune, North Carolina
- 1967 - Roy DeFilippis, San Diego, California
- 1968 - George McGarvey, Washington, DC
- 1969 - Joe Bennett, Joliet, Illinois
- 1970 - Ray Lunny III, San Francisco, California
- 1971 - Ricky Boudreaux, New Orleans, Louisiana
- 1972 - Jerome Artis, Philadelphia, Pennsylvania
- 1973 - Howard Davis Jr., Glen Cove, New York
- 1974 - Michael Hess, Portland, Oregon
- 1975 - Davey Lee Armstrong, Tacoma, Washington
- 1976 - Davey Lee Armstrong, Tacoma, Washington
- 1977 - Johnny Bumphus, Nashville, Tennessee
- 1978 - Elichi Jumawan, Wahiawa, Hawaii
- 1979 - Bernard Taylor
- 1980 - Clifford Gray, Boynton Beach, Florida
- 1981 - Guadalupe Suarez, Corpus Christi, Texas
- 1982 - Orlando Johnson, Chicago, Illinois (spring), Clifford Gray, Boynton Beach, Florida (winter)
- 1983 - Andrew Minsker, Portland, Oregon
- 1984 - Lyndon Walker, Washington, DC
- 1985 - Runnell Doll, Army
- 1986 - Kelcie Banks, Chicago, Illinois
- 1987 - Kelcie Banks, Chicago, Illinois
- 1988 - Carl Daniels, St. Louis, Missouri
- 1989 - Frank Peña, Aurora, Colorado
- 1990 - Oscar De La Hoya, Los Angeles, California
- 1991 - Ivan Robinson, Philadelphia, Pennsylvania
- 1992 - Julian Wheeler, Navy
- 1993 - Julian Wheeler, Navy
- 1994 - Frank Carmona, Los Angeles, California
- 1995 - Floyd Mayweather Jr., Grand Rapids, Michigan
- 1996 - Augie Sanchez, Los Angeles, California
- 1997 - Jason Ingwaldson, Glendora, California
- 1998 - Michael Evans
- 1999 - Rocky Juarez, Houston, Texas
- 2000 - Rocky Juarez, Houston, Texas
- 2001 - Andre Dirrell, Flint, Michigan
- 2002 - Johnny Vasquez Jr., Snyder, Texas
- 2003 - Aaron Garcia, Vista, California
- 2004 - Brandon Ríos Garden City, Kansas
- 2005 - Mark Davis, Cleveland, Ohio
- 2006 - Mark Davis, Cleveland, Ohio
- 2007 - Raynell Williams, Cleveland, Ohio
- 2008 - Robert Rodriguez
- 2009 - Kevin Rivers
- 2010 - Joseph Diaz Jr., Elmonte, California
- 2011 - Joseph Diaz Jr., Elmonte, California
- 2012 - Joet Gonzalez, Glendora, California
- 2013 - Gary Antonio Russell (with headgear), Eduardo Martinez (without headgear)
- 2014 - JaRico O'Quinn
- 2015 - Christopher Colbert
- 2016 - Duke Ragan
- 2017 - Duke Ragan
- 2018 - Duke Ragan
