= Paul Ingle =

British boxer

Personal information
- Nickname: Yorkshire Hunter
- Born: Paul Andrew Ingle; 22 June 1972 (age 54) Scarborough, North Yorkshire, England
- Height: 5 ft 5 in (165 cm)
- Weight: Featherweight

Boxing career
- Reach: 66 in (168 cm)
- Stance: Orthodox

Boxing record
- Total fights: 25
- Wins: 23
- Win by KO: 16
- Losses: 2

Paul Andrew Ingle (born 22 June 1972) is a British former professional boxer who competed from 1994 to 2000. He held featherweight world championships, including the International Boxing Federation (IBF) title from 1999 to 2000 and the lesser International Boxing Organization (IBO) title in 2000. At regional level he held the European, British, and Commonwealth titles between 1997 and 1999. As an amateur, Ingle represented Great Britain at the 1992 Summer Olympics, reaching the second round of the flyweight bracket.

== Amateur career ==
Ingle was a member of the 1992 British Olympic team and competed in the flyweight division. In the first round he defeated Alexander Baba of Ghana by 9–7, but lost 12–13 in the second round to eventual gold medallist Choe Chol-su of North Korea. He won the 1991 Amateur Boxing Association British flyweight title, boxing out of Scarborough ABC.

== Professional career ==
Ingle made his professional debut on 23 March 1994, scoring a third-round knockout over Darren Noble. On 11 January 1997, he stopped Colin McMillan in eight rounds to win his first regional championship, the British featherweight title. Later that year, on 11 October, Ingle defeated Jon Jo Irwin by eighth-round corner retirement to win the Commonwealth featherweight title. Ingle completed the regional trifecta when he won the European featherweight title on 26 September 1998, stopping Billy Hardy in eight rounds.

=== First world title challenge ===
By the time Ingle challenged for his first world title against WBO featherweight champion Naseem Hamed, he had won 21 consecutive fights without a loss. During the entrances for their fight, Ingle was kept waiting in the ring for six minutes. Angered by this, he and his trainer Steve Pollard went back to the dressing room and only returned after Hamed had finally made his own entrance. In the opening round of the fight, Ingle was knocked down and barely made it out of the round following an onslaught of punches by Hamed. A body shot floored Ingle again in the sixth, but with twenty seconds remaining he emerged unscathed. In rounds nine and ten, Ingle had some success by bloodying Hamed's nose. A third knockdown in the eleventh ended Ingle's challenge, as referee Joe Cortez deemed him unable to continue as he stood up on shaky legs.

=== IBF featherweight champion ===
Despite this first career loss, Ingle received another world title opportunity in his next fight, on 13 November 1999. He went on to defeat IBF featherweight champion Manuel Medina by unanimous decision, albeit suffering a knockdown in the twelfth and final round. In his first defence of the title, Ingle travelled to the United States for the first time and fought on the undercard of Lennox Lewis vs. Michael Grant. Facing him was former two-weight world champion Junior Jones, who held the IBO featherweight title. In an action-packed fight which was close on the judges' scorecards, Ingle was knocked down in round nine, but rallied back in dramatic fashion to stop Jones in the eleventh.

=== Retirement and life after boxing ===
Ingle's boxing career ended on 16 December 2000, losing both the IBF and IBO titles to Mbulelo Botile. The fight had undergone several postponements due to Ingle sustaining injuries in training and being unable to make the 126 lbs featherweight limit. After suffering a knockdown in round eleven, Ingle went down again in the twelfth and did not rise for several minutes. He was stretchered out of the ring and hospitalised for a blood clot on the brain, spending four weeks in intensive care after suffering a brain injury from which he never fully recovered. A boxing gym, the Paul Ingle Boxing Academy, has since opened in his honour, in Hull.

== Professional boxing record ==
25 fights	23 wins	2 losses
By knockout	16	2
By decision	7	0

No.	Result	Record	Opponent	Type	Round, time	Date	Location	Notes
25	Loss	23–2	Mbulelo Botile	TKO	12 (12), 0:20	16 Dec 2000	Sheffield Arena, Sheffield, England	Lost IBF and IBO featherweight titles
24	Win	23–1	Junior Jones	TKO	11 (12), 1:16	29 Apr 2000	Madison Square Garden, New York City, New York, US	Retained IBF featherweight title; Won IBO featherweight title
23	Win	22–1	Manuel Medina	UD	12	13 Nov 1999	Hull Arena, Kingston-upon-Hull, England	Won IBF featherweight title
22	Loss	21–1	Naseem Hamed	TKO	11 (12), 0:45	10 Apr 1999	MEN Arena, Manchester, England	For WBO featherweight title
21	Win	21–0	Billy Hardy	TKO	8 (12), 2:53	26 Sep 1998	Barbican Centre, York, England	Retained Commonwealth featherweight title; Won European featherweight title
20	Win	20–0	Rakhim Mingaleyev	KO	4 (12), 2:53	8 Aug 1998	The Spa, Scarborough, England	Won vacant IBF Inter-Continental featherweight title
19	Win	19–0	Moussa Sangare	RTD	10 (12), 3:00	9 Jun 1998	Hull Arena, Hull, England	
18	Win	18–0	Trust Ndlovu	PTS	12	28 Mar 1998	Hull Arena, Hull, England	Retained Commonwealth featherweight title
17	Win	17–0	Jon Jo Irwin	RTD	8 (12), 3:00	11 Oct 1997	Sheffield Arena, Sheffield, England	Retained British featherweight title; Won Commonwealth featherweight title
16	Win	16–0	Michael Alldis	RTD	11 (12), 3:00	28 Apr 1997	Hull Arena, Hull, England	Retained British featherweight title
15	Win	15–0	Colin McMillan	TKO	8 (12), 1:42	11 Jan 1997	York Hall, London, England	Won British featherweight title
14	Win	14–0	Chris Jickells	KO	4 (8)	6 Nov 1996	Hull Arena, Hull, England	
13	Win	13–0	Brian Robb	KO	2 (8)	3 Sep 1996	York Hall, London, England	
12	Win	12–0	Ervine Blake	KO	2 (8)	29 Jun 1996	Erith Leisure Centre, London, England	
11	Win	11–0	Greg Upton	KO	10 (10), 1:54	5 Feb 1996	Crook Log Leisure Centre, London, England	
10	Win	10–0	Demir Nanev	KO	5 (8)	15 Dec 1995	York Hall, London, England	
9	Win	9–0	Miguel Matthews	KO	4 (8)	29 Sep 1995	York Hall, London, England	
8	Win	8–0	Des Gargano	TKO	2 (6), 0:23	16 Jun 1995	Elephant and Castle Shopping Centre, London, England	
7	Win	7–0	Peter Buckley	PTS	8	27 Apr 1995	York Hall, London, England	
6	Win	6–0	Peter Buckley	PTS	8	23 Feb 1995	Elephant and Castle Shopping Centre, London, England	
5	Win	5–0	Graham McGrath	PTS	6	24 Nov 1994	Cottingham, England	
4	Win	4–0	Anthony Hanna	PTS	6	3 Aug 1994	Whitchurch Sports Centre, Bristol, England	
3	Win	3–0	Neil Swain	KO	4 (6)	25 May 1994	Colston Hall, Bristol, England	
2	Win	2–0	Graham McGrath	PTS	4	27 Apr 1994	York Hall, London, England	
1	Win	1–0	Darren Noble	KO	3 (6), 2:59	23 Mar 1994	STAR Centre, Cardiff, Wales	

Sporting positions
Regional boxing titles
Preceded by Colin McMillan	British featherweight champion 11 January 1997 – May 1998; Vacated	Vacant Title next held by Jon Jo Irwin
Preceded by Jon Jo Irwin	Commonwealth featherweight champion 11 October 1997 – November 1998; Vacated	Vacant Title next held by Patrick Mullings
Vacant Title last held by Volodymyr Matkivskyy	IBF Inter-Continental featherweight champion 8 August 1998 – April 1999; Vacated	Vacant Title next held by Michael Gomez
Preceded by Billy Hardy	European featherweight champion 26 September 1998 – April 1999; Vacated	Vacant Title next held by Steve Robinson
Minor world boxing titles
Preceded by Junior Jones	IBO featherweight champion 29 April 2000 – 16 December 2000	Succeeded by Mbulelo Botile
Minor world boxing titles
Preceded by Manuel Medina	IBF featherweight champion 13 November 1999 – 16 December 2000	Succeeded by Mbulelo Botile
