= Billy Hardy (boxer) =

British boxer

Personal information
- Nationality: (United Kingdom) British
- Born: William Hardy; 5 September 1964 (age 61) Sunderland, England
- Weight: Bantamweight & Featherweight

Boxing career

Boxing record
- Total fights: 48
- Wins: 37
- Win by KO: 17
- Losses: 9
- Draws: 2
- No contests: 0

Billy Hardy (born 5 September 1964 in Sunderland) is a former bantamweight and featherweight boxer champion. He held the British championship at bantamweight and featherweight, as well as the European and Commonwealth featherweight titles.

The Billy Hardy Sports Centre, in Castletown, Sunderland bears his name.

He started boxing when he was six or seven, at the Hylton Castle Boys Club. He was an aggressive boxer who liked to come forward and take the fight to his opponent.

Being a dedicated fan of Sunderland Football Club, Hardy normally fought wearing red and white striped shorts, the club colours.

== Professional career ==
He had his first professional fight in November 1983, beating Kevin Downer on points over six rounds at Eltham, Kent.

=== British bantamweight title ===
He built up a record of thirteen wins and three defeats before fighting for the British bantamweight title against the holder Ray Gilbody. The title fight was in February 1987 in St Helens and Hardy took the title when the fight was stopped in the fourth, Gilbody having been down four times.

In March 1988, he defended his British title against John Hyland in his hometown of Sunderland, knocking the challenger out in the second round.

In November 1988, he fought the Italian, Vincenzo Belcastro for the European bantamweight title. The fight was in Paola, Italy and Hardy lost a narrow points decision after twelve rounds.

In February 1989, he successfully defended his British title against Ronnie Carroll in Sunderland, winning on points.

In June 1989, he had a re-match with Belcastro for the European title. The fight was in Pavia, Italy, and this time the decision was even closer, being declared as a draw.

In October 1989, he defended his British title against Brian Holmes, in Sunderland. Hardy made short work of the challenger, knocking him out in the first round.

=== IBF bantamweight attempts ===
Hardy's impressive record at bantamweight had put him in line for a shot at the IBF world bantamweight title, held by the American, Orlando Canizales. The challenge was in January 1990 at the Crowtree Leisure Centre, Sunderland, and it went the full twelve rounds with Canizales retaining his title on a split decision.

In November 1990, Hardy defended his British title for the third time, again against Ronnie Carroll. This time the fight was stopped in the eighth with Hardy retaining his title.

In May 1991, Hardy had a re-match with Orlando Canizales, who so narrowly defeated him the previous year. This time the fight was in Canizales' hometown of Laredo, Texas, and the champion won on a technical knockout in the eighth round. Hardy had also been knocked down in round three.

=== Featherweight titles ===
Hardy relinquished his British bantamweight title in 1991. In October 1992, he moved up a weight, when he fought Australian, Ricky Rayner for the vacant Commonwealth featherweight title. The fight was in Sunderland, and Hardy won the title when the fight was stopped in the tenth.

In May 1993, he defended his Commonwealth title in Sunderland, against Canadian Barrington Francis, winning on points.

In May 1994, he fought Alan McKay, a southpaw from Watford. The fight, in Sunderland, was for Hardy's Commonwealth title and the vacant British featherweight title. The fight was stopped in the eighth with Hardy now the holder of both titles. Later in the year, Hardy relinquished the British title.

In October 1994, he defended his Commonwealth title in Sun City, South Africa, against local challenger Stanford Ngcebeshe. Hardy won on points over twelve rounds.

In February 1995, he made a further defence, in Sunderland, against Percy Commey, of Ghana. Hardy won by a technical knockout in the eleventh round.

=== European title ===
In October 1995, Hardy challenged for the European featherweight title. He fought in Fontenay-sous-Bois, near Paris, against the Algerian holder, Mehdi Labdouni. Hardy won on points over twelve rounds to take the title.

In February 1996, he defended his Commonwealth title against English boxer, Michael Alldis, winning on points.

In June 1996, he defended his European title in Sanremo, Italy against Stefanno Zoff, winning on points.

In February 1997, Hardy defended his European title against Welsh boxer, Steve Robinson, who had held the WBO world featherweight title before losing it to Naseem Hamed. The fight, in Sunderland, was dominated by Hardy, and he claimed a points decision.

=== WBO and IBF featherweight attempt ===
In May 1997, Hardy had his biggest fight, when he challenged for the WBO and IBF world featherweight titles held by fellow Englishman, Naseem Hamed. The fight was held in Manchester and many of Hardy's fans travelled from Sunderland to support him. He tried to take the fight to Hamed but paid the price, when he was caught by a right-hand that broke his nose and his cheekbone. Hardy was knocked down twice, and the fight was stopped after only 93 seconds.

=== Remaining career ===
In January 1998, he defended his European title against Algerian, Mehdi Labdouni at York Hall, Bethnal Green, winning on points to retain the title.

In September 1998, Hardy had his last fight, when he defended his European and Commonwealth titles against Yorkshireman, Paul Ingle, former holder of the IBF world featherweight title. The fight was in York, and Hardy started well, but was caught in the eighth round, and the fight was stopped.

Following this defeat, Hardy retired aged thirty-four.

== See also ==
- List of British featherweight boxing champions
- List of British bantamweight boxing champions
