= London Arena =

Former indoor arena in London, England

- London Docklands Arena

- The London Arena, seen before demolition
- Interactive map of London Arena
- Location: Millwall, London, England
- Coordinates: 51.49673°N 0.01484°W
- Owner: SMG and Anschutz (1998)
- Capacity: 15,000

Construction
- Opened: 22 April 1989
- Renovated: 1998
- Closed: December 2005
- Demolished: June 2006
- Cost: £24 million (1989) £10 million (1998 refit)
- Architects: Stewart K. Riddick & Partners (1989); HOK Sport (1998)
- Project manager: Poole Stokes Wood (PSW Projects) (1998)
- Structural engineer: Fairhurst (1998)
- Services engineer: Mott MacDonald

Tenants
- London Knights (BSIL, 1998–2003); London Towers (BBL, 1989–1990); Greater London Leopards (BBL, 1994–1999)

The London Arena (also known as London Docklands Arena) was an indoor arena and exhibition centre in Millwall, on the Isle of Dogs, in east London, England which was inaugurated in 1989 as part of the redevelopment of the London Docklands and demolished for housing in 2006.

It could seat up to 12,500 people in the stands and up to 15,000 in concert mode. Events ranged from sport events like basketball, ice hockey, professional wrestling, and boxing to music concerts and trade exhibitions. It was the home of the London Knights ice hockey team, the London Towers basketball team and later the Greater London Leopards basketball team.

== History ==
The arena was built in a converted shed (itself built in 1969) on the grounds of a former harbour warehouse at Millwall Inner Dock as part of the redevelopment of the Docklands area, which was developed from a harbour and industrial area to a trade and residential one. The project was led by peer Malcolm Mitchell-Thomson, 3rd Baron Selsdon, sports commentator Ron Pickering, music promoter Harvey Goldsmith, and boxing promoter Frank Warren. The conversion, scheduled to cost £8 million, was funded partly by a consortium of Bovis, GEC and Mecca Entertainment, and partly by the land owners London Docklands Development Corporation (LDDC), the Sports Council of Great Britain, the Amateur Athletics Association and Tower Hamlets London Borough Council. Bovis were the management contractors.

The venue originally opened in March 1986, but was immediately rebuilt under new plans and reopened officially in April 1989. As part of the conversion into an arena, the central bays were replaced with a tall new structure to seat 12,615 spectators. The architects were Stewart K. Riddick & Partners with the steel frame designed by Fairhursts and assembled by Graham Wood. The final cost of the whole conversion was £24 million. The arena was a hangar-like building with an uninterrupted span of 281 ft (86m) on 59 ft (18m) columns, the largest such hall erected in Britain since Wembley Arena opened in 1934.

The London Arena went into receivership in May 1991. Spectacor Management Group (SMG), the world's largest private facility management company, took over ownership of the London Arena in 1994. The company manages arenas and stadiums in the US and Europe, including the Louisiana Superdome, the Mile High Stadium in Denver and the Ullevaal Stadium in Oslo. During 1998, SMG entered into a partnership agreement with another American based company, Anschutz Sports Holdings, to hold an equal share in the ownership of London Arena.

=== Renovation ===
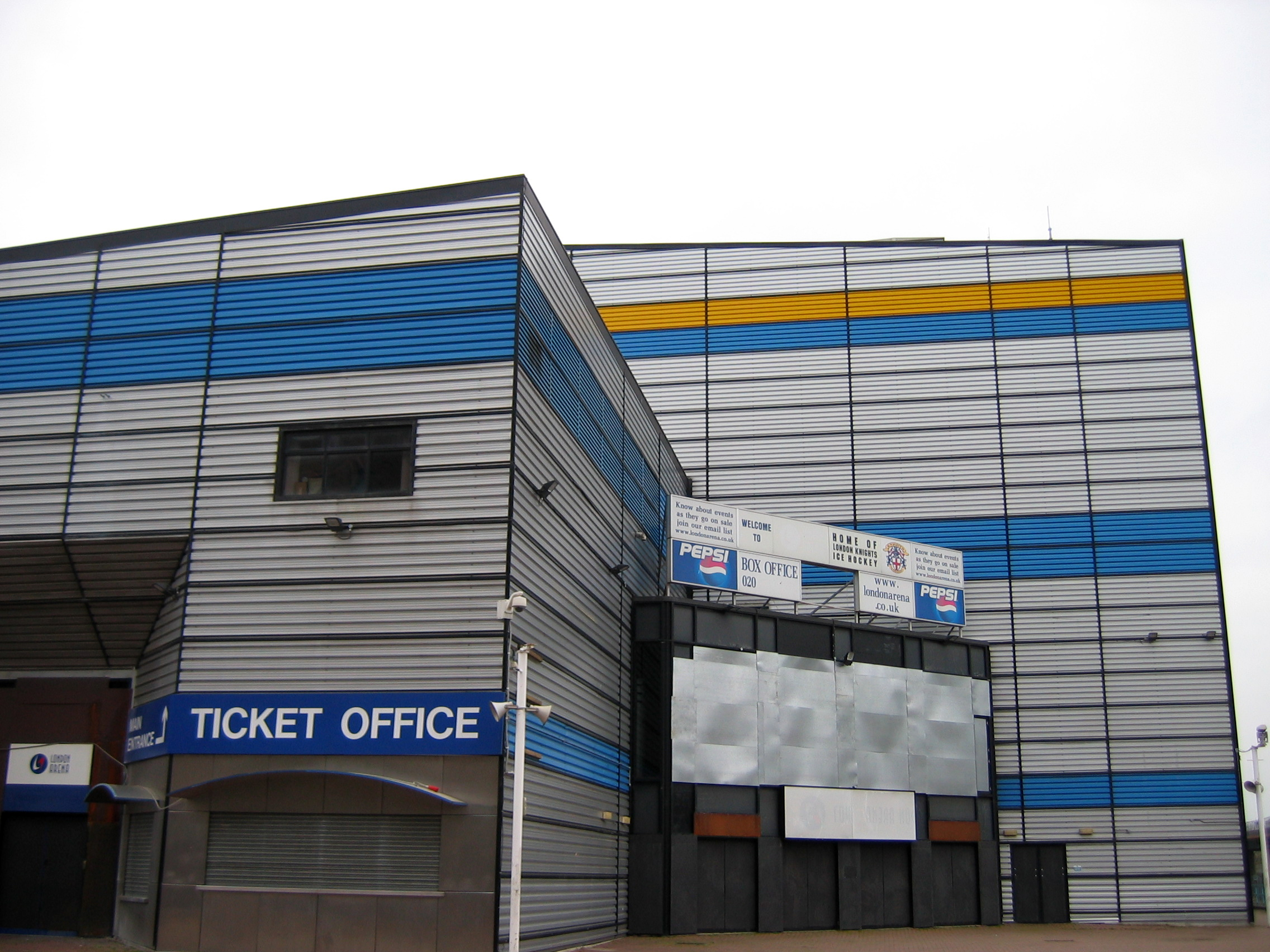
Main entrance to the London Arena (2004)

The arena received a £10 million refit in 1998, allowing the capacity of the arena to be altered hydraulically. One of the primary reasons for the refit by joint owners, Anschutz Entertainment Group, was to introduce professional ice hockey back to London with the London Knights. Along with this, the brief given to architects, HOK Sport (now Populous), was to turn the arena into a major multi-entertainment centre. This involved introducing a permanent Olympic-size ice rink, 48 luxury hospitality boxes with views over the arena, two brand new team dressing rooms, a completely refurbished foyer and box office, plus a state-of-the-art SACO SmartVision video scoreboard, the only one of its kind outside the US.

However, the arena continued to struggle to attract enough visitors and events to be profitable and it never managed to become a financial success. One reason for this was its rather isolated geographical position, combined with poor local road and public transport access and limited parking space, although it was well served by the Crossharbour and London Arena DLR station. However, on days when events were held at the arena, it was not uncommon for the small station to be severely overcrowded.

=== Sale, closure and demolition ===
In 2003, the arena was sold, which, combined with the disbanding of the Ice Hockey Superleague, led to the folding of the London Knights, the only tenant at the arena at the time, leaving the arena without a permanent tenant, which made the situation worse.

In 2005, the arena was closed and was superseded as the main arena in that area by The O2 Arena, which is in The O2 entertainment complex (formerly the Millennium Dome).

The arena was demolished in June 2006 and has since been replaced by a mostly-residential development, including the Baltimore Tower. In 2007, the Crossharbour and London Arena DLR station was renamed to simply Crossharbour. However, the London Arena name still remains on a few street signs in the area.

== Notable events ==
=== Events ===
On 18 November 1989, the Arenaball Transatlantic Challenge, the first ever Arena Football League exhibition game in Europe, was played there, with the Detroit Drive winning over the Chicago Bruisers 43–14.

In 1989, the WWE held its first ever United Kingdom event at the London Arena, as well as the UK Rampage 1991 event and Capital Carnage in December 1998. In 1995 it was the venue for the Nigel Benn vs. Gerald McClellan boxing match. It hosted the Lennox Lewis vs. Francois Botha heavyweight boxing fight in 2000, and the Naseem Hamed vs. Manuel Calvo featherweight bout in 2002.

From 1989 to 1990 the arena hosted the final stages of the News of the World Darts Championship.

Frank Sinatra played the arena on 4 July 1990, with the Woody Herman Orchestra conducted by Frank Sinatra Jr..

The 1998 and 1999 editions of the Brit Awards were held at the arena, and from 1989 until 2001, it was also the annual venue of the Smash Hits Poll Winners Party.

In the year 2000 World Championship Wrestling would tour the UK twice, unknown to many it would be the final times they would be on British shores before being purchased by rival promotion World Wrestling Entertainment in March 2001. The first tour in March was a part of non-televised "house" shows, the show at the Docklands Arena was a sell out, then on November 13 they would return for a televised episode of WCW Nitro which also sold out the Docklands Arena. The episode is available on the WWE Network.

In December 2005, it housed the annual 'Crisis Open Christmas' event (held the previous year in the Millennium Dome) providing food, accommodation and various medical and social services to homeless people in London, organised by the London-based homelessness charity Crisis.

=== Concerts ===
Act	Date	Tour	Notes
Duran Duran	22 April 1989	1988–1989 The Big Live Thing	The first band to headline at the London Arena. The first band to play at the arena was Thrashing Doves - the support band
Pink Floyd	4–9 July 1989	Another Lapse Tour	Without Roger Waters
Erasure	11 December 1989	Wild! Tour	A recording of the concert was released on VHS.
David Bowie	26–28 March 1990	Sound+Vision Tour	Clips from the shows were broadcast on national television news networks.
New Kids on the Block	11–13 May 1990	The Magic Summer Tour	
INXS	26 November 1990		
Janet Jackson	8 April 1995	Janet World Tour	The first of four sold-out shows held in London, with the other three held at Wembley Arena.
Eurythmics	6 December 1999	peacetour	Recorded for DVD named after the tour, released in 2000.
Various	1, 2 July 2000	The Lost Weekend Festival	Metal festival, acts included Skunk Anansie, Queen Adreena, A Perfect Circle, Machine Head and Rollins Band. The main headliner was scheduled to be Nine Inch Nails, but they cancelled their appearance due to a band member's illness and were replaced by Ash.
Britney Spears	15, 16 November 2000	Oops!... I Did It Again Tour	One of the shows was filmed and broadcast on TV channel Sky1
Eminem	9, 10 February 2001	Anger Management Tour	With Xzibit, D12 and So Solid Crew.
Deftones	24 March 2001	Back to School Tour	With Linkin Park and Taproot
Linkin Park	16 September 2001	Hybrid Theory World Tour	With Puddle Of Mudd, Adema, Dilated Peoples. Audio recordings of their performances of "Papercut", "Points of Authority", "A Place for My Head", "With You" and "High Voltage" were released on the 20th anniversary reissue of Hybrid Theory.
Slipknot	16 February 2002	European Iowa Tour 2K2	The concert was recorded and released as a live DVD called Disasterpieces.
S Club 7	23–24 February 2002	S Club Carnival Tour	A recording of the concert was released on VHS/DVD in late 2002.
Travis (band)	22 March 2002	The Invisible Band Tour	
Destiny's Child	7, 8 June 2002	Destiny's Child World Tour	First UK gig of their 2002 tour.
Red Hot Chili Peppers	26 June 2002	By the Way World Tour	
Guns N' Roses	26 August 2002	Chinese Democracy Tour	
Korn	7, 8 September 2002	Untouchables Tour	
Will Young and Gareth Gates	3 October 2002	Will and Gareth Tour (with special guest Zoe Birkett)	Dual billed concert from the stars of Pop Idol, recorded for VHS/DVD release in early 2003.

=== Television ===
The arena was used as a studio to film the tenth and final series (before its later reboot) of the ITV gameshow You Bet! in 1997.

== See also ==
- London Docklands Development Corporation
