= Augie Sanchez =

American boxer

Augustine Anthony Sanchez (born November 17, 1977, in Las Vegas, Nevada, U.S.) is an American boxing trainer and retired featherweight boxer. As an amateur boxer, he was the US featherweight champion, known for being the last American to defeat Floyd Mayweather Jr. as an amateur (before losing to Mayweather twice). As a professional boxer, Sanchez had some success up until his KO loss to Naseem Hamed, after which Sanchez retired following several fights. He later became a boxing trainer.

== Amateur career ==
Augie Sanchez was a stellar amateur boxer, highlighted by his winning the 1996 United States Amateur Featherweight title. He defeated Floyd Mayweather in the Olympic Trials in one of their three amateur bouts. He lost a chance to represent the United States.

== Professional career ==
Known as "Kid Vegas", Sanchez turned professional in 1996. As a professional Sanchez was able to achieve some success, but was hampered by a questionable chin, which resulted in three brutal knockout losses. He was considered a very hard puncher, which was highlighted in his high-profile fight with Naseem Hamed. He knocked Hamed down (although the referee did not rule it an official knockdown), and landed some hard bombs that shook Naseem. Sanchez in return suffered a brutal KO loss at the hands of Hamed, which resulted in him leaving the ring on a stretcher. He did return, beating a shot Luisito Espinosa, but losing by a 30-second KO to John Michael Johnson in 2001. Following this loss the Nevada State Athletic Commission denied the renewal of Sanchez's boxing license. Sanchez has attempted to regain his boxing license once with Nevada, but was denied, due to the brutality of his knockout losses. In 2009, Sanchez reapplied for his license and, after passing all required medical tests, he was granted a license to fight again. Sanchez chose not to return to the ring stating that he reapplied for his license because he wanted the decision to retire to be his decision, not anyone else's.

== Professional Boxing trainer ==
Sanchez currently works as a boxing trainer, and trains Michael Hunter Jr., son of former boxer Mike Hunter. In 2016, after an intensive selection process USA Boxing selected Coach Augie Sanchez as a Coach for the US Olympic Team. He went on to become the National Junior and Youth Head Coach for USA Boxing, where he took teams to compete around the world; in 2018 he was awarded the Best Coach award, out of over 60 coaches from around the world, at the Youth World Championships in Russia. Augie is now training his own stable of boxers in Las Vegas Nevada.

He trains his fighters at Barrys Boxing Center in Las Vegas, Nevada. He is married to the daughter of the owners Pat and Dawn Barry.

Sporting positions
Amateur boxing title
Previous: Floyd Mayweather	U.S. featherweight champion 1996	Next: ?
