= Brendan Ingle =

Irish boxer (1940–2018)

Brendan Ingle MBE
- Born: 19 June 1940; Dublin, Ireland
- Died: 25 May 2018 (aged 77); Sheffield, England
- Known for: Training Johnny Nelson, Naseem Hamed, Junior Witter, Kell Brook, Kid Galahad
- Relatives: Róisín Ingle (niece); Sean Ingle (great-nephew)
- Boxing career
- Weight: Middleweight
- Stance: Orthodox

Boxing record
- Total fights: 33
- Wins: 19
- Win by KO: 6
- Losses: 14

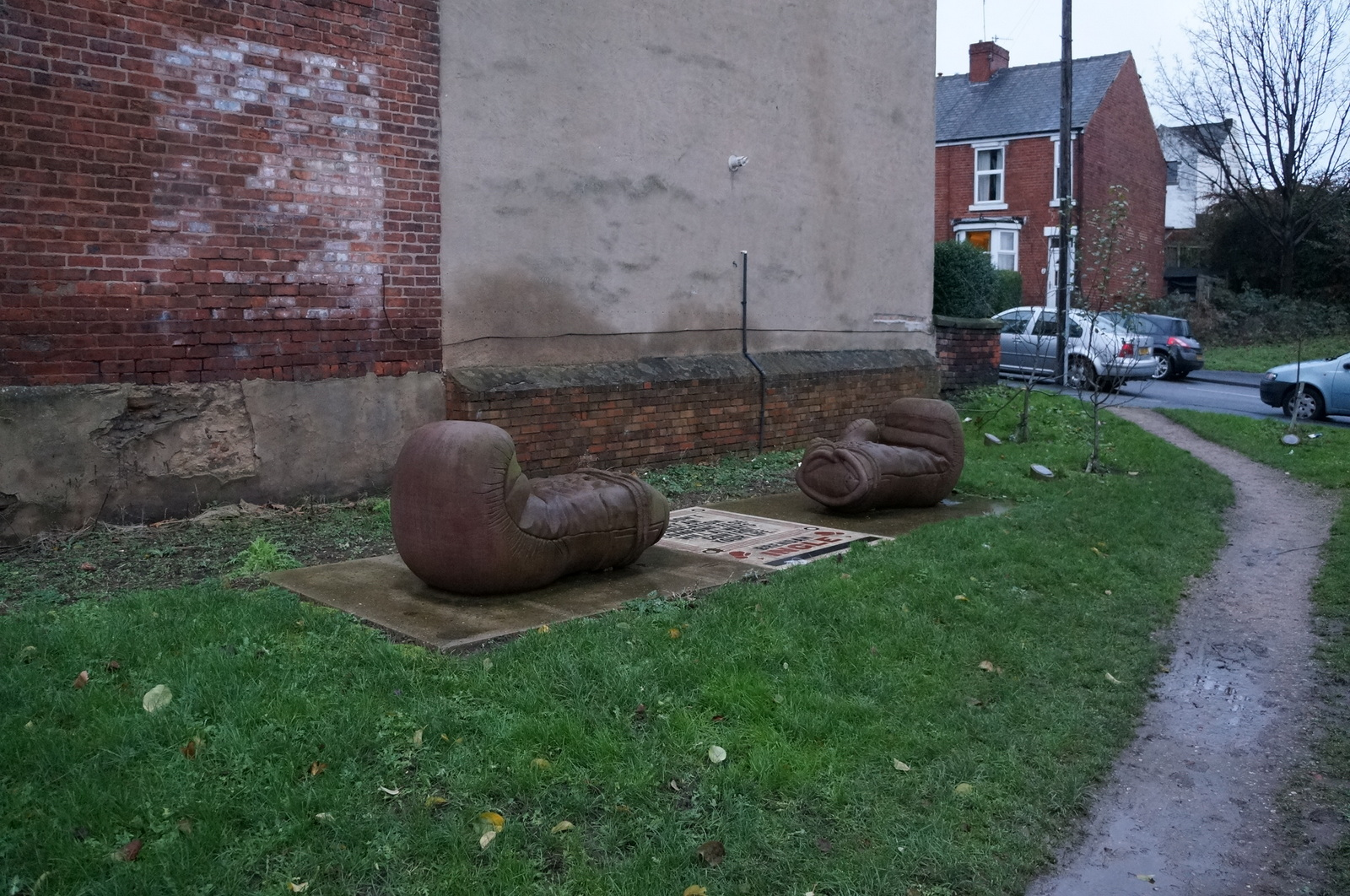
The boxing glove statue dedicated to Ingle in Wincobank, Sheffield

Brendan Ingle MBE (19 June 1940 – 25 May 2018) was an Irish boxing trainer, manager, and former professional boxer based in Sheffield, England. He trained five world champions at his Wincobank gym: Johnny Nelson, Naseem Hamed, Junior Witter, Kell Brook, and Kid Galahad.

== Early life ==
Ingle was born in the Ringsend area of Dublin in 1940. He was one of 16 children of dock labourer Charlie (‘Hoppy’) Ingle and Sarah Ingle (née Lawless).

== Professional career ==
Ingle competed professionally as a middleweight from 1965 to 1973, with a record of 19 wins and 14 losses. He unsuccessfully fought for the BBofC Central Area Middleweight title in October 1973 against Pat Dwyer.

== Training career ==
While living in Wincobank, Sheffield, England, Ingle was asked by a local vicar to carry out some community work because youth in the area were "running wild." He knew nothing but boxing, but he organised a weekly dance at St Thomas' church hall and the boxing gym St Thomas' Boys & Girls Club was opened.

Herol "Bomber" Graham, undefeated in ten years is what Ingle would call "the best person to come out of our gym," although perhaps Ingle is best known for being Naseem Hamed's mentor from the age of seven to 25. He has also trained former IBF Light Heavyweight titlist Clinton Woods and was the trainer of former WBC Light Welterweight titlist Junior Witter. He also was trainer of former WBO cruiserweight champion Johnny Nelson. He lived in Wincobank, Sheffield, just across the road from his gym, St Thomas' Boys and Girls Club.

In total he has trained four world champions, six European, 15 British, and six Commonwealth champions. Ingle's fighters relied on footwork and reflexes for defence, leaving the hands free for offensive activity.

== Honours ==
Ingle was awarded an MBE in 1998 for his services and contributions to British boxing and his work with young people in the Sheffield area.

He received an honorary doctorate from Sheffield Hallam University.

== Personal life ==
Brendan's sons, Dominic and John, both run the Ingle Gym their father established.

Ingle's eldest brother, Jimmy, was a famous Irish champion boxer. His niece is Róisín Ingle, The Irish Times journalist. He was also great-uncle of The Guardian sports journalist Sean Ingle.

In August 2014, Ingle was one of 200 public figures who were signatories to a letter to The Guardian opposing Scottish independence in the run-up to September's referendum on that issue.

== Death ==
Ingle died in May 2018 due to a brain hemorrhage at the age of 77. Upon his death, former student Johnny Nelson paid tribute to Ingle as "the best trainer in the world".

== Media portrayal ==
Ingle is played by Pierce Brosnan in the 2025 film Giant, about the relationship between him and Naseem Hamed.

== Professional boxing record ==
33 fights	19 wins	14 losses
By knockout	6	8
By decision	13	4
By disqualification	0	2

No.	Result	Record	Opponent	Type	Round, time	Date	Location	Notes
33	Loss	19–14	Poul Knudsen	KO	3 (6)	1 Nov 1973	K.B. Hallen, Copenhagen, Denmark	
32	Loss	19–13	Pat Dwyer	PTS	10	21 Oct 1973	Cliffs Pavilion, Southend-on-Sea, England	For Central Area middleweight title
31	Win	19–12	Joe Gregory	KO	3 (8)	3 Jul 1973	Burlington Hotel, Dublin, Ireland	
30	Win	18–12	Dave Nelson	PTS	6	14 May 1973	Piccadilly Hotel, Manchester, England	
29	Win	17–12	Mick Hussey	PTS	8	30 Apr 1973	Premier Sporting Club, London, England	
28	Win	16–12	Charlie Small	PTS	8	6 Mar 1973	Norbreck Castle Hotel, Blackpool, England	
27	Loss	15–12	Charlie Small	TKO	5 (6)	29 Jan 1973	Great International Sporting Club, Nottingham, England	
26	Win	15–11	Billy Brooks	PTS	6	15 Jan 1973	Premier Sporting Club, London, England	
25	Win	14–11	Peter Mullins	KO	4 (6)	8 Jan 1973	National Sporting Club, London, England	
24	Loss	13–11	Johnny Wall	PTS	6	24 Apr 1972	County Hotel, Bedford, England	
23	Loss	13–10	Fred Powney	TKO	2 (8)	13 Apr 1970	Piccadilly Hotel, Manchester, England	
22	Loss	13–9	Tom Jensen	PTS	6	2 Apr 1970	Vejlby-Risskov Hallen, Aarhus, Denmark	
21	Loss	13–8	Chris Finnegan	TKO	8 (8), 1:45	5 Aug 1969	Piccadilly Hotel, Manchester, England	
20	Loss	13–7	Ronnie Hough	TKO	3 (8)	2 Jul 1969	Sophia Gardens, Cardiff, Wales	
19	Win	13–6	Dervan Airey	PTS	8	19 May 1969	Adelphi Hotel, Liverpool, England	
18	Loss	12–6	Liam Dolan	DQ	3 (8)	26 Mar 1969	Trentham Gardens, Stoke-on-Trent, England	
17	Loss	12–5	Ronnie Hough	TKO	2 (8)	6 Feb 1969	The Stadium, Liverpool, England	
16	Win	12–4	Danny Ashie	PTS	4	2 Jan 1969	National Sporting Club, London, England	
15	Win	11–4	Don Reid	PTS	6	25 Nov 1968	Broadway Sporting Club, Manchester, England	
14	Win	10–4	Brian Bonsor	TKO	6 (8)	4 Nov 1968	Gosforth Park Hotel, Newcastle, England	
13	Win	9–4	Maurice Thomas	PTS	6	1 Oct 1968	Civic Hall, Wolverhampton, England	
12	Loss	8–4	Danny Ashie	TKO	6 (8)	18 Jul 1968	Olympic Ballroom, Dublin, Ireland	
11	Win	8–3	Danny Ashie	PTS	6	22 Apr 1968	Grosvenor House, London, England	
10	Loss	7–3	Mick Cain	DQ	5 (6)	8 Apr 1968	Hilton Hotel, London, England	
9	Win	7–2	Peter Lane	PTS	6	2 Apr 1968	Civic Hall, Wolverhampton, England	
8	Win	6–2	Chris McAuley	PTS	6	27 Feb 1968	Fiesta Ballroom, Belfast, Northern Ireland	
7	Loss	5–2	Liam Dolan	PTS	6	11 Dec 1967	Piccadilly Hotel, Manchester, England	
6	Win	5–1	Dave Derbyshire	PTS	6	10 Oct 1966	Free Trade Hall, Manchester, England	
5	Loss	4–1	Willie Turkington	TKO	1 (6)	8 Feb 1966	Ulster Hall, Belfast, Northern Ireland	
4	Win	4–0	Wesley Williams	TKO	4 (6)	21 Dec 1965	Town Hall, Leeds, England	
3	Win	3–0	Dave Derbyshire	TKO	4 (6)	15 Nov 1965	Wyvern Sporting Club, Manchester, England	
2	Win	2–0	Miles Mitton	TKO	4 (6)	1 Nov 1965	Free Trade Hall, Manchester, England	
1	Win	1–0	Dick Griffiths	PTS	6	4 Oct 1965	Free Trade Hall, Manchester, England	
