= Pat Dwyer (boxer, born 1946) =

English boxer (1946–2019)

Personal information
- Nationality: British (English)
- Born: 2nd quarter 1946 Liverpool, England
- Died: 18 April 2019 (aged 72) Liverpool, England

Sport
- Sport: boxing

Patrick Dwyer (1946 – 2019) was an English boxer who fought 51 contests between 1965 and 1973. He fought under the name Pat Dwyer.

== Biography ==
Dwyer won the 1965 Amateur Boxing Association British light-middleweight title, when boxing out of the Maple Leaf ABC.

He turned professional in November 1965 and won 20 of his 38 professional victories inside the distance.
