= István Kovács (boxer) =

Hungarian boxer

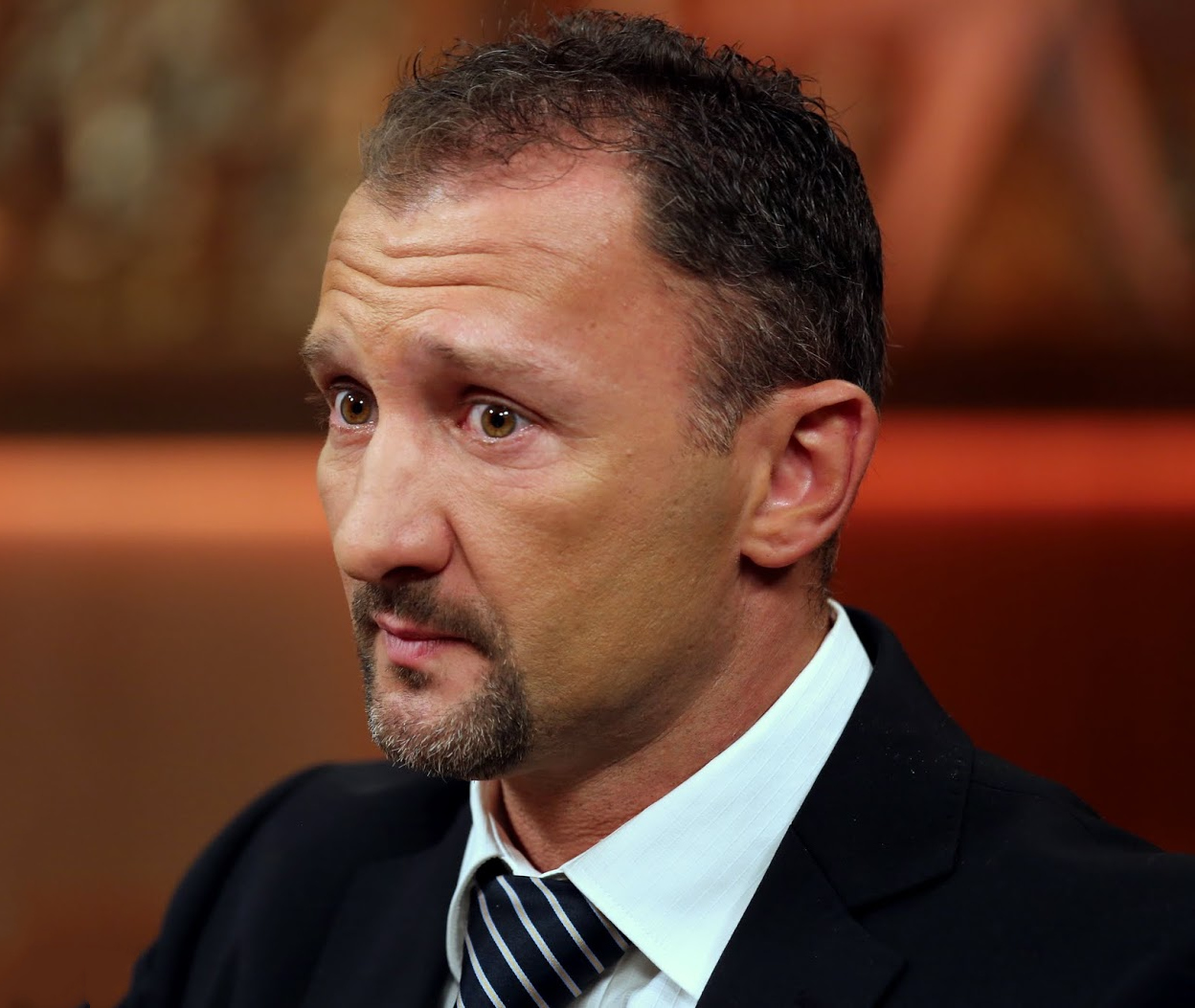

Personal information
- Nicknames: Ko-Ko; The Cobra
- Nationality: Hungarian
- Born: 17 August 1970 (age 55) Budapest, Hungarian People's Republic (now Hungary)
- Height: 5 ft 7 in (170 cm)
- Weight: Featherweight

Boxing career
- Reach: 66 in (168 cm)
- Stance: Orthodox

Boxing record
- Total fights: 23
- Wins: 22
- Win by KO: 11
- Losses: 1
Medal record
Men's Boxing
Representing Hungary
Olympic Games
| Bronze medal – third place | 1992 Barcelona | Flyweight |
| Gold medal – first place | 1996 Atlanta | Bantamweight |
World Amateur Championships
| Gold medal – first place | 1991 Sydney | Flyweight |
| Gold medal – first place | 1997 Budapest | Featherweight |
European Amateur Championships
| Gold medal – first place | 1991 Gothenburg | Flyweight |
| Bronze medal – third place | 1993 Bursa | Bantamweight |
| Gold medal – first place | 1996 Vejle | Bantamweight |

István Kovács (born August 17, 1970), nicknamed Ko-Ko or sometimes The Cobra, is a Hungarian retired world champion boxer. He is a Secretary General of the AIBA.

As an amateur, he won the bantamweight gold medal at the 1996 Summer Olympics, and was a world champion at the 1991 World Amateur Boxing Championships in flyweight and at the 1997 World Amateur Boxing Championships in featherweight.

He was a world champion as a professional, winning the WBO featherweight title in 2001.

== Amateur career ==
Kovács was born in Budapest and began his sports career as a football player, training among others in the youth team of MTK Budapest. He started boxing relatively late at the age of 15 in EVIG SE. He moved to Vasas SC in 1988 where he was trained by Gyula Bódis. His first international success also came in 1988 when he won the junior-flyweight gold medal at the Junior European Championship in Gdańsk. He soon started to dominate the lower weightclasses on the Hungarian scene among such rivals like Olympic bronze medallists János Váradi and Róbert Isaszegi, and in 1990 he was already a member of the Hungarian team at the World Cup in Dublin where he won a silver medal.

In 1991, already as a flyweight, he won the gold medal at the European Championships in Gothenburg and later that year he also won the World Championship in Sydney. Due to his outstanding achievements he was elected as Hungarian Sportsman of The Year the end of the year, ahead of competitors like legendary medley swimmer Tamás Darnyi who was elected as that year's World Swimmer of the Year and wrestling world champion Péter Farkas.

Kovács's spectacular boxing style and nice personality soon made him a crowd and media favourite, and he was widely considered one of Hungary's top gold medal chances at the 1992 Summer Olympics in Barcelona. He easily outpointed his first three opponents, but in the semi-finals he was surprisingly upset by Choi Chol-Su from North Korea. Choi, who defeated other future professional world champions Paul Ingle and Robbie Peden in his two previous bouts, went on to win the gold medal and Kovács had to settle for the bronze which was considered by many to be a disappointment at that time.

After the Olympics Kovács's career seemed to decline. He broke up with his long-time trainer and continued with Imre Szántó and moved up to bantamweight, but his results did not achieve the same level as before, his best result being a bronze medal at the 1993 European Championships in Bursa and at the 1995 World Cup in Bangkok. The media also reported about party nights and personal problems, and many thought that he will never find his former self.

But in 1996 Kovács came roaring back, once again winning the European Championships in Vejle, and then in the summer he finally gained the long-awaited Olympic gold medal in Atlanta outpointing Arnaldo Mesa from Cuba in the final. At the end of the year he was elected as Sportsman of The Year in Hungary for the second time.

After the Olympics he was signed by the Hamburg-based professional stable Universum Box-Promotion together with the now-famous Klitschko brothers Vitali and Wladimir, to join world champions Dariusz Michalczewski, Artur Grigorian and Regina Halmich, but he opted to stay among the amateurs for one more year because Budapest was to host the 1997 World Championships, where in front of several thousand home supporters, he managed to conclude his amateur career by winning his second gold medal, this time in featherweight.

He finished his amateur career with an outstanding record of 282 wins, 14 losses and one draw.

== Professional career ==
Kovács began his professional career coached by former top class amateur East German trainer Fritz Sdunek in late 1997, amidst great media hype in Hungary, with one of the newly founded nationwide TV channels buying the exclusive rights to broadcast his bouts. In his first fight he knocked out Frenchman Ahmed Lain in the first round and racked up a 10–0 record within little more than one year. In his ninth bout he defeated former EBU champion Vincenzo Belcastro and in 1999 he gained the WBC featherweight intercontinental belt by defeating Nabaloum Dramane in Budapest. Due to his technical skills, fast foot- and handspeed and spectacular fighting style he was often compared to fellow 1996 Olympian Floyd Mayweather Jr. who started his long-lasting reign in the super-featherweight division at that time, and he was considered the future challenger of the unbeaten WBO featherweight champion Naseem Hamed.

Kovács was to make his debut in the United States in late 1999 in Las Vegas, but in the last days before the bout his nose was broken while sparring with Bones Adams who grabbed the WBA super-bantamweight title a few months later. Many consider this as a crucial point in Kovács's professional career as he ultimately never fought in the United States. Instead his management started to organize another event in Budapest against former WBO featherweight champion and reigning EBU champion Steve Robinson. In June 2000 Kovács vanquished a shutout victory against Robinson, grabbed the EBU belt and became the mandatory WBO challenger for Hamed.

Hamed chose to relinquish the WBO belt and fight Mexican superstar Marco Antonio Barrera instead. The WBO ordered Kovács and Antonio "Chelo" Diaz from the Dominican Republic to fight for Hamed's vacated belt. In January 2001 in Munich, on his twentieth professional fight, Kovács TKOd Diaz in the 12th round and became the first Hungarian professional boxing world champion.

Kovács's first title defense match came in June 2001, against unheralded Argentinian Julio Pablo Chacón. Chacón also participated on the 1996 Olympics, and won a bronze medal in the featherweight division, coincidentally defeating another member of the Hungarian team János Nagy in the quarter-finals before losing to the eventual gold medalist Somluck Kamsing in the semis. He had a solid professional record but rarely fight outside Argentina, and one year before his fight against Kovács he suffered a lopsided defeat against WBA champion Fred Norwood in Mendoza. With thousands of home supporters behind him Kovács seemed to be the overwhelming favourite of the bout.

However, on 16 June 2001 Chacón shocked the Hungarian crowd by knocking out Kovács in the sixth round. In the first four rounds Kovács built up a comfortable lead on all scorecards, but in the fifth Chacón rocked him with a monster right hook. Kovács's knees buckled, and though he did not go down and spread his arms to show that he is OK, he was rightfully counted on by the referee. Still shaken by the punch (which was the first knockdown since his amateur career) and urged by the fans, instead of trying to survive the round he went after his opponent and only seconds before the bell he was caught again, this time by a huge left hook and was floored. He stood up visibly in trouble, only to be saved by the end of the round. His former coach Imre Szántó, acting as a TV commentator kept telling in the break that he should not continue the fight, yet Kovács came out for the sixth round, only to be knocked down by Chacón again in a few seconds, and the referee calling the bout to a halt immediately.

This was one of the major boxing upsets in 2001, though it was overshadowed by the likes of Lennox Lewis losing to Hasim Rahman and Félix Trinidad losing to Bernard Hopkins. In Hungary Kovács was considered a national hero, and his loss was considered by many to be a national tragedy. Rematch clause was not included in the fight contract, and Chacón went on to defend his title two times to other opponents before losing it to Scott Harrison in 2002. Later in 2003 Félix Rácz, a Hungarian boxing manager came up with the idea of bringing Chacón to Hungary again to fight against his former Olympian opponent János Nagy, who since then also turned professional, had an unbeaten record and held the WBO super-featherweight intercontinental title. The bout was entitled "The Revenge" in reference to the Chacón-Kovács fight, and ended in the 10th round in a controversial fashion after Nagy hit his opponent below the belt, and was not disqualified while Chacon was unwilling to continue after the allowed regaining time (a year later the two met again in Hungary in a non-title bout, this time Nagy narrowly outpointing Chacón).

As for Kovács, he never seemed to be the same in the ring. He fought twice more against limited opposition with his former confidence visibly shaken, and after unsuccessful managerial attempts to set up another title fight for him, he retired for good in 2002. His professional record is 22-1.

== Professional boxing record ==
| 23 fights | 22 wins | 1 loss |
|---|---|---|
| By knockout | 11 | 1 |
| By decision | 11 | 0 |

| No. | Result | Record | Opponent | Type | Round, time | Date | Location | Notes |
|---|---|---|---|---|---|---|---|---|
| 23 | Win | 22–1 | Steve Trumble | TKO | 3 (8) | 2002-04-20 | Hala Olivia, Gdańsk, Poland | |
| 22 | Win | 21–1 | Jose Alfonso Rodriguez | UD | 8 (8) | 2001-12-15 | Estrel Hotel, Berlin, Germany | |
| 21 | Loss | 20–1 | Pablo Chacón | TKO | 6 (12) | 2001-06-16 | Kisstadion, Budapest, Hungary | Lost WBO featherweight title |
| 20 | Win | 20–0 | Antonio Díaz | TKO | 12 (12) | 2001-01-27 | Rudi-Sedlmayer-Halle, Munich, Germany | Won vacant WBO featherweight title |
| 19 | Win | 19–0 | Agustin Lorenzo | TKO | 1 (8) | 2000-10-14 | Kolnarena, Cologne, Germany | |
| 18 | Win | 18–0 | Steve Robinson | UD | 12 (12) | 2000-06-23 | FTC Stadium, Budapest, Hungary | Retained WBC International featherweight title; Won European featherweight title |
| 17 | Win | 17–0 | Ismael Lopez | TKO | 2 (8) | 2000-04-15 | Preussag Arena, Hanover, Germany | |
| 16 | Win | 16–0 | Juan Manuel Chavez | KO | 2 (8) | 2000-03-18 | Alsterdorfer Sporthalle, Hamburg, Germany | |
| 15 | Win | 15–0 | Euloge Makiza Sita | KO | 5 (8) | 1999-09-25 | Kolnarena, Cologne, Germany | |
| 14 | Win | 14–0 | Kimoun Kouassi | UD | 8 (8) | 1999-08-28 | Stadthalle, Bremen, Germany | |
| 13 | Win | 13–0 | Dramane Nabaloum | UD | 12 (12) | 1999-05-22 | Budapest Sportcsarnok, Budapest, Hungary | Won vacant WBC International featherweight title |
| 12 | Win | 12–0 | Manuel Gomes | UD | 8 (8) | 1999-03-13 | Hansehalle, Lübeck, Germany | |
| 11 | Win | 11–0 | Mario Nestor Cabello | KO | 2 (8) | 1999-02-20 | Alsterdorfer Sporthalle, Hamburg, Germany | |
| 10 | Win | 10–0 | Alexander Tiranov | TKO | 5 (8) | 1999-01-30 | Stadthalle, Cottbus, Germany | |
| 9 | Win | 9–0 | Vincenzo Belcastro | UD | 8 (8) | 1998-11-28 | Hansehalle, Lübeck, Germany | |
| 8 | Win | 8–0 | Paul Kaoma | UD | 8 (8) | 1998-09-19 | Arena Oberhausen, Oberhausen, Germany | |
| 7 | Win | 7–0 | Jozef Kubovsky | UD | 8 (8) | 1998-07-10 | Circus Krone Building, Munich, Germany | |
| 6 | Win | 6–0 | Kino Rodriguez | KO | 4 (8) | 1998-05-23 | Oberrheinhalle, Offenburg, Germany | |
| 5 | Win | 5–0 | Mike Deveney | KO | 6 (8) | 1998-03-20 | Ballsporthalle, Frankfurt, Germany | |
| 4 | Win | 4–0 | Wilson Acuna | UD | 6 (6) | 1998-02-14 | Maritim Hotel, Stuttgart, Germany | |
| 3 | Win | 3–0 | Pascal Montulet | UD | 6 (6) | 1998-01-30 | Berdux Filmstudios, Munich, Germany | |
| 2 | Win | 2–0 | Brahim Abouda | UD | 6 (6) | 1997-12-20 | Oberrheinhalle, Offenburg, Germany | |
| 1 | Win | 1–0 | Ahmed Lain | KO | 1 (4) | 1997-12-13 | Alsterdorfer Sporthalle, Hamburg, Germany | |

== Retirement ==
After retiring, Kovács took up several media roles and hosted various TV shows. He also mentored several Hungarian boxers in his former professional club, Universum, including former WBO light heavyweight and WBC cruiserweight champion Zsolt Erdei, former WBO super middleweight champion Károly Balzsay, super-bantamweight challenger Zsolt Bedák and his flyweight brother, Pál Bedák.

Kovács formerly operated a successful restaurant and sports bar in Budapest called Boxutca (the name is a play on words: "boxutca" as such means pit stop in Hungarian and it also includes "boxing"). The restaurant closed in the early 2010s.

Kovács is the current vice president and chairman of WBO Europe. He was the sanctioning body's supervisor for Manny Pacquiao's title bout against Timothy Bradley in Las Vegas on June 9, 2012.

In March 2021, Kovács was appointed as a secretary general of AIBA under its new president, Umar Kremlev. He held this post until July 2022.

== See also ==
- List of world featherweight boxing champions

Sporting positions
Regional boxing titles
| Vacant Title last held by Juan Carlos Ramírez | WBC International featherweight champion 22 May 1999 – 27 January 2001; Won world title | Vacant Title next held by Anthony Tshehla |
| Preceded by Steve Robinson | European featherweight champion 23 June 2000 – 27 January 2001; Won world title | Vacant Title next held by Manuel Calvo |
World boxing titles
| Vacant Title last held by Naseem Hamed | WBO featherweight champion 27 January 2001 – 16 June 2001 | Succeeded by Pablo Chacón |
Awards
| Previous: Tamás Darnyi | Hungarian Sportsman of the Year; 1991 | Next: Tamás Darnyi |
| Previous: Imre Pulai | Hungarian Sportsman of the Year; 1996 | Next: Botond Storcz |
