= Michael Brodie =

British boxer

Personal information
- Nickname: Mikie
- Nationality: (England) English
- Born: Michael Brodie; 10 May 1974 (age 52) Manchester, England
- Height: 5 ft 6 in (168 cm)
- Weight: Super Bantamweight; Featherweight

Boxing career
- Stance: Orthodox

Boxing record
- Total fights: 41
- Wins: 36
- Win by KO: 24
- Losses: 4
- Draws: 1
- No contests: 0

Michael Brodie (born 10 May 1974) is a former English professional boxer who competed from 1994 to 2009. He fought in the Super Bantamweight and Featherweight divisions. He challenged twice for the WBC featherweight title in 2003 and 2004.

== Early life ==
Brodie was born in Manchester, Lancashire, England in 1974.

== Professional career ==
Brodie boxed as an amateur before turning professional in October 1994, winning his first fight in Manchester, England, in which Brodie beat Warley Super Bantamweight Graham McGrath with a knockout in the fifth round on a card that included fellow Mancunian's Wahid Fats, Carl Smith and Carl Harney.

Brodie won the vacant British super bantamweight title, in March 1997 with a ten-round knockout win over Neil Swain at the Wythenshawe Forum in Manchester. The following year Brodie won the Commonwealth Super Bantamweight Title with a win over Brian Carr and later that year Brodie added the European (EBU) Super Bantamweight Title.

Brodie's first opportunity to fight for a world title belt arrived in September 2000 after Mexican Erik Morales vacated his WBC Super bantamweight title. However, Brodie suffered the first defeat on his career when Willie Jorrín beat Brodie on points to take the title.

In May 2002, Brodie won the World Boxing Foundation (WBF) Featherweight Title and added the IBO Featherweight Title in 2003.

On 18 October 2003, the brawling Chi In-Jin got a shot at the vacant WBC featherweight title against Michael Brodie, but came up short of the title with a draw. In the rematch the following year, he knocked out Brodie in the 7th round.
