= Steve Robinson (boxer) =

Welsh boxer

Personal information
- Nickname: The Cinderella Man
- Nationality: Welsh
- Born: Steve Robinson; 13 December 1968 (age 57) Cardiff, Wales
- Weight: Featherweight and Super featherweight

Boxing career
- Stance: Orthodox

Boxing record
- Total fights: 51
- Wins: 32
- Win by KO: 17
- Losses: 17
- Draws: 2

Steve Robinson (born 13 December 1968, in Cardiff) is a Welsh former professional boxer who competed from 1989 to 2002. He held the WBO featherweight title from 1993 to 1995.

He was trained by the late boxing coach, Ronnie Rush.

== Professional career ==
On 17 April 1993 the defending Featherweight Champion, Ruben Palacios from Colombia, was due to defend his title in Washington, England against John Davison from England. However, the champion failed an HIV test by the BBBC prior to the bout and was immediately stripped of his title by the WBO. With only two days to go before the bout, the promoters had to find another opponent to face Davison. Steve Robinson accepted the chance to fight for the WBO crown. Robinson won the bout by a points decision against all the odds. He was the new WBO World Featherweight Champion. He was a worthy champion with 7 successful defences of his title.

On 30 September 1995 he defended his title for the last time, against Prince Naseem Hamed from Sheffield, England. Hamed dominated the fight and Steve Robinson was knocked out in the eighth round.

He challenged for the European featherweight title on 3 February 1997, against the holder Billy Hardy, but was beaten on points.

He challenged for the European title, against John Jo Irwin on 4 December 1999 and won the bout on a points decision, and became the new European Boxing Union Featherweight Champion. However, 6 months later on 23 June 2000, he lost his title to István Kovács from Hungary.

He challenged for the European featherweight title again on 25 May 2001, but ended in defeat over 12 rounds against Manuel Calvo from Spain.

Further defeats followed and Steve Robinson had decided to retire after his sixth loss in a row. He made his announcement after his points defeat to Steve Conway on 27 April 2002. He said after the bout, "I don't want to end it this way but there you are – it's happened. I've seen the great heights and I've some fantastic memories but I've beaten better men than Steve Conway and I just think it's time to call it a day."

== In retirement ==
On 1 February 2006, Robinson started Train Station 2, a "White Collar Boxing" fitness centre in Cardiff. He now runs Steve Robinson's Boxing Gym in his home town of Cardiff where he hopes to train a world champion.

In 2009 and 2010, he acted in the films The Boxer and Risen.

In September 2020, Robinson announced that he had joined the Welsh National Party.

Sporting positions
Preceded by (Colombia) Ruben Palacios	WBO Featherweight Champion; 17 April 1993 – 30 September 1995	Succeeded by (England) Naseem Hamed
Regional boxing titles
Vacant Title last held by John Jo Irwin	WBO Featherweight Champion; Inter-Continental title 8 March 1997 – 11 March 2000	Succeeded by Juan Carlos Ramírez
Vacant Title last held by John Jo Irwin	EBU Featherweight Champion; 4 December 1999 – 23 June 2000	Succeeded by István Kovács
