= List of Presidential Medal of Freedom recipients =

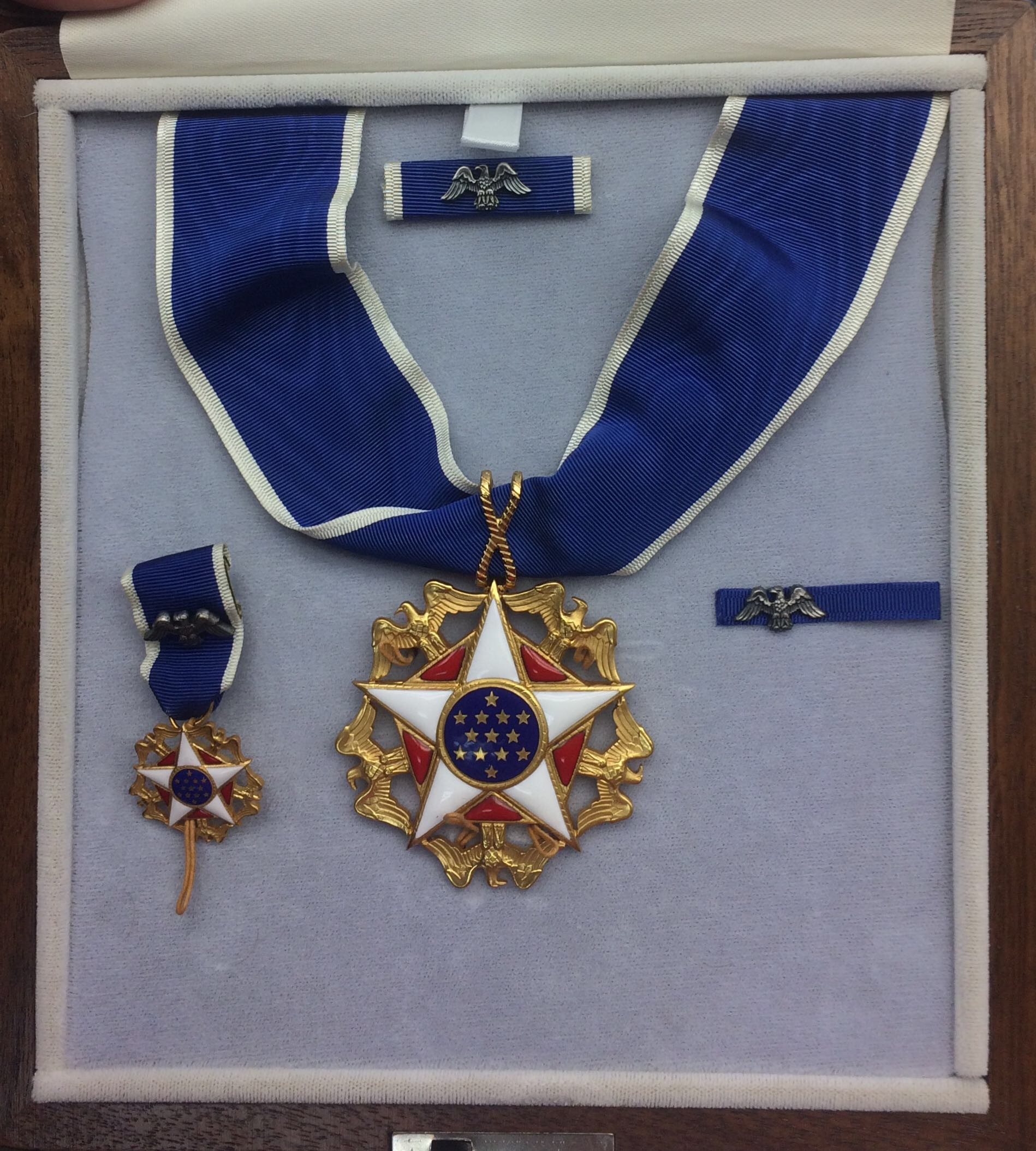
The Presidential Medal of Freedom

This is a partial list of recipients of the Presidential Medal of Freedom, listed chronologically within the aspect of life in which each recipient is or was renowned.

The Presidential Medal of Freedom is awarded by the president of the United States to "any person recommended to the President for award of the Medal or any person selected by the President upon his own initiative". Before 1970, honorees were either selected by the president or recommended to them by the Distinguished Civilian Service Awards Board.

== History ==
Typically the medal is bestowed upon the recipient by the sitting president who has chosen them. However, the first recipients selected by president John F. Kennedy before his assassination were formally awarded by his successor in office, Lyndon B. Johnson.

President Barack Obama awarded 118 medals, the most of any president, followed by President Bill Clinton with 89 medal recipients. Three people—Ellsworth Bunker, Colin Powell, and Ben Carson—are two-time recipients of the Presidential Medal of Freedom. Powell received his second award with distinction, while Bunker was given both of his awards with distinction.

Eight presidents have themselves received the medal posthumously, post-presidency, or prior to being elected:

- John F. Kennedy (1963, posthumously)
- Lyndon B. Johnson (1980, posthumously)
- Ronald Reagan (1993, with distinction)
- Gerald Ford (1999)
- Jimmy Carter (1999)
- George H. W. Bush (2011)
- Bill Clinton (2013)
- Joe Biden (2017, as Vice President; with distinction)

In 2015, Obama stated that there was no precedent to revoke a Presidential Medal of Freedom, regarding the award given to stand-up comedian and actor Bill Cosby. After being awarded the medal in 2002 by Obama's predecessor, George W. Bush, Cosby was convicted of multiple counts of sexual assault, though the convictions were later overturned.

The Presidential Medal of Freedom is related to, but distinct from, the Medal of Freedom, an earlier award issued between 1945 and 1963 to honor US civilian contributions to World War II.

In 2022 at the age of 25, athlete and activist Simone Biles became the youngest person to receive the award.

=== Declinations of the award ===
Bill Belichick, coach of the New England Patriots, was offered the Presidential Medal of Freedom by President Donald Trump, and initially accepted it, but changed his mind and turned down the medal after the January 6 United States Capitol attack.

Country musician Dolly Parton turned down the medal twice from Donald Trump. Parton said she turned it down the first time because her husband was ill, and the second time because of the COVID-19 pandemic.

=== Awarded with Distinction ===
The Presidential Medal of Freedom (with Distinction)

As of 2025, 28 individuals (Ellsworth Bunker twice, which is a total of 29 WDs) have been awarded the Presidential Medal of Freedom (with Distinction):

John F. Kennedy – 8

1. James B. Conant
2. Robert A. Lovett
3. Luis Muñoz Marín
4. John J. McCloy
5. Jean Monnet
6. Ralph Bunche
7. Felix Frankfurter
8. Ellsworth Bunker – (first WD)

Lyndon B. Johnson – 6

1. Edward R. Murrow
2. Dean Acheson
3. Carl Vinson
4. Ellsworth Bunker – (second WD)
5. Clark Clifford
6. Dean Rusk

Richard Nixon – 4

1. Buzz Aldrin
2. Neil Armstrong
3. Michael Collins
4. W. Averell Harriman

Gerald Ford – 4

1. Martha Graham
2. Arthur Rubinstein
3. David K. E. Bruce
4. Donald Rumsfeld

Jimmy Carter – 0

0 – (none)

Ronald Reagan – 1

1. Caspar Weinberger

George H. W. Bush – 1

1. Ronald Reagan

Bill Clinton – 1

1. Colin Powell

George W. Bush – 1

1. Pope John Paul II

Barack Obama – 1

1. Joe Biden

Donald Trump – 0
0 – (none)

Joe Biden – 1

1. Pope Francis

== List ==
- † – Awarded posthumously
- WD – Awarded "with Distinction"

=== Selected by John F. Kennedy ===
John F. Kennedy selected 31 recipients to be awarded in 1963. After his assassination they were officially awarded by Lyndon B. Johnson.

Recipient	Year	Notes	Notable as	Ref.
Marian Anderson	1963		Classical Contralto & First African-American to perform at the Metropolitan Opera	
Ralph Bunche	1963	WD	Political Scientist, Mediator in Israel & First person of African descent to receive a Nobel Prize	
Ellsworth Bunker	1963	WD	U.S. Ambassador to Argentina, Italy and India	
Pablo Casals	1963		Cellist	
Genevieve Caulfield	1963		Founder of the Bangkok School for the Blind in Thailand	
James B. Conant	1963	WD	Chemist, 23rd president of Harvard University & 1st U.S. ambassador to West Germany	
John Franklin Enders	1963		Biomedical Scientist & Developer of the Measles Vaccine	
Felix Frankfurter	1963	WD	Associate Justice of the Supreme Court of the United States	
Karl Holton	1963		Head of the Los Angeles County Probation Department & Director of the California Youth Authority	
Robert J. H. Kiphuth	1963		Head Coach for Men's Swimming at Yale University	
Edwin H. Land	1963		Co-founder of the Polaroid Corporation & Inventor of the Polaroid Instant Camera	
Herbert H. Lehman	1963	(Note: Lehman died the day before the ceremony.)	United States senator from New York & 45th governor of New York	
Robert A. Lovett	1963	WD	4th United States secretary of defense	
J. Clifford MacDonald	1963		Philanthropist & President of the Arc of the United States	
John J. McCloy	1963	WD	United States assistant secretary of war & U.S. high commissioner for occupied Germany	
George Meany	1963		1st president of AFL-CIO	
Alexander Meiklejohn	1963		Philosopher & President of Amherst College	
Ludwig Mies van der Rohe	1963		Architect	
Jean Monnet	1963	WD	Entrepreneur & Founding Father of the European Union	
Luis Muñoz Marín	1963	WD	1st elected governor of Puerto Rico	
Clarence B. Randall	1963		Chairman of the board of Inland Steel Company & Presidential Advisor	
Rudolf Serkin	1963		Pianist	
Edward Steichen	1963		Photographer	
George W. Taylor	1963		Professor of industrial relations at the Wharton School at the University of Pennsylvania	
Alan Tower Waterman	1963		1st director of the National Science Foundation	
Mark S. Watson	1963		Editor and Correspondent for The Baltimore Sun	
Annie Dodge Wauneka	1963		Member of the Navajo Nation Council	
E. B. White	1963		Writer	
Thornton Wilder	1963		3x Pulitzer Prize Winning Playwright & Novelist	
Edmund Wilson	1963		Writer & Literary Critic	
Andrew Wyeth	1963		Realist and Regionalist Painter & Visual Artist	

=== Awarded by Lyndon B. Johnson ===
Lyndon B. Johnson awarded 58 medals between 1963 and 1969, excluding 31 which were selected by John F. Kennedy.

Recipient	Year	Notes	Notable as	Ref.
John XXIII	1963	†	Pope	
John F. Kennedy	1963	†	35th president of the United States	
Dean Acheson	1964	WD	51st United States secretary of state	
Detlev Bronk	1964		6th president of Johns Hopkins University, 16th president of the National Academy of Sciences & 3rd president of Rockefeller University	
Aaron Copland	1964		Classical composer	
Willem de Kooning	1964		Abstract expressionist artist	
Walt Disney	1964		Co-founder and President of the Walt Disney Company	
J. Frank Dobie	1964		Folklorist	
Lena Frances Edwards	1964		Physician & medical advisor to the National Association of Colored Women's Clubs; First African-American woman to be awarded the Presidential Medal of Freedom	
T. S. Eliot	1964		Modernist poet	
Lynn Fontanne	1964		Actress	
John W. Gardner	1964		6th United States secretary of health, education, and welfare	
Theodore Hesburgh	1964		Ordained Priest of the Congregation of Holy Cross & 15th President of University of Notre Dame	
Clarence Johnson	1964		Aeronautical and Systems Engineer & Contributing Designer to the Lockheed U-2 and SR-71 Blackbird	
Frederick Kappel	1964		9th President of Western Electric & Chairman of AT&T	
Helen Keller	1964		Disability Rights Advocate, Human Rights Activist & Member of the American Foundation for the Blind	
John L. Lewis	1964		9th President of the United Mine Workers & 1st President of the Congress of Industrial Organizations	
Walter Lippmann	1964		Founding Editor of New Republic & Political Commentator	
Alfred Lunt	1964		Actor & Director	
Ralph McGill	1964		Editor of the Atlanta Constitution & Anti-Segregationist	
Samuel Eliot Morison	1964		Maritime Historian	
Lewis Mumford	1964		Historian, Sociologist & Philosopher of Technology	
Edward R. Murrow	1964	WD	Broadcast Journalist & WWII War Correspondent	
Reinhold Niebuhr	1964		Reformed Theologian, Ethicist & Professor at Union Theological Seminary	
Leontyne Price	1964		Soprano & First African-American Soprano to Achieve International Acclaim	
A. Philip Randolph	1964		Founder and President of the Brotherhood of Sleeping Car Porters	
Carl Sandburg	1964		3x Pulitzer Prize Winning Poet	
John Steinbeck	1964		Nobel Prize Winning Writer	
Helen B. Taussig	1964		Cardiologist, Founder of Pediatric Cardiology & Co-developer of the Blalock-Thomas-Taussig shunt Surgical Procedure	
Carl Vinson	1964	WD	Member of the U.S. House of Representatives & Father of the Two-Ocean Navy	
Thomas Watson Jr.	1964		President of the International Business Machines Corporation	
Paul Dudley White	1964		Presidential Physician to Dwight D. Eisenhower & Co-founder of the American Heart Association	
Ellsworth Bunker	1967	WD	U.S. Ambassador to the Organization of American States and South Vietnam	
Robert Komer	1967		3rd Deputy National Security Advisor & U.S. Ambassador to Turkey	
Eugene M. Locke	1967		U.S. Ambassador to Pakistan & South Vietnam	
Robert McNamara	1968		8th United States Secretary of Defense	
James E. Webb	1968		2nd Administrator of NASA	
Eugene R. Black Sr.	1969		3rd President of the World Bank Group	
McGeorge Bundy	1969		5th United States National Security Advisor	
Clark Clifford	1969	WD	9th United States Secretary of Defense & Chair of the President's Intelligence Advisory Board	
Michael DeBakey	1969		Chairman of the Department of Surgery, President, and Chancellor of Baylor College of Medicine at the Texas Medical Center	
David Dubinsky	1969		President of the International Ladies Garment Workers Union	
Ralph Ellison	1969		Writer & Literary Critic	
Henry Ford II	1969		President, CEO and Chairman of the Board of the Ford Motor Company	
Bob Hope	1969		Comedian & Vaudevillian	
Edgar Kaiser	1969		Member of the Committee on Urban Housing & General Manager of the Kaiser-Frazer Corporation	
Mary Lasker	1969		Philanthropist & Founder of the Lasker Foundation	
John Macy	1969		President of the United States Civil Service Commission	
Gregory Peck	1969		Actor & Humanitarian	
Laurance Rockefeller	1969		Conservationist & Philanthropist	
Dean Rusk	1969	WD	54th United States Secretary of State	
Walt Whitman Rostow	1969		6th United States National Security Advisor	
Merriman Smith	1969		White House Correspondent for United Press International & Pulitzer Prize Winning Journalist	
Cyrus Vance	1969		7th United States Secretary of the Army & 11th United States Deputy Secretary of Defense	
William S. White	1969		Pulitzer Prize Winning Journalist for the United Feature Syndicate	
Roy Wilkins	1969		Executive Director of the National Association for the Advancement of Colored People	
Whitney Young	1969		Civil Rights Leader & Member of the National Urban League	

=== Awarded by Richard Nixon ===
Richard Nixon awarded 28 medals between 1969 and 1974.

Recipient	Year	Notes	Notable as	Ref.
Buzz Aldrin	1969	WD	Astronaut, Pilot & Apollo 11 Crew Member	
Neil Armstrong	1969	WD	Astronaut, Aeronautical Engineer & Apollo 11 Crew Member	
Michael Collins	1969	WD	Astronaut, Pilot & Apollo 11 Crew Member	
Duke Ellington	1969		Jazz Pianist & Composer	
W. Averell Harriman	1969	WD	48th Governor of New York & 11th United States Secretary of Commerce	
Earl Charles Behrens	1970		Political Editor for the San Francisco Chronicle	
Edward T. Folliard	1970		Pulitzer Prize Winning Journalist for The Washington Post	
Fred Haise	1970		Astronaut, Pilot & Apollo 13 Crew Member	
William Henry	1970		Journalist & Daily Columnist for the Los Angeles Times	
Arthur Krock	1970		3x Pulitzer Prize Winning Journalist for The New York Times	
David Lawrence	1970		Founder of U.S. News & World Report	
G. Gould Lincoln	1970		Political Reporter for The Washington Evening Star	
Jim Lovell	1970		Astronaut, Pilot & Apollo 13 Crew Member	
Mission Operations Team	1970			
Raymond Moley	1970		Political Economist, Presidential Advisor to Franklin D. Roosevelt & Columnist for Newsweek & National Review	
Eugene Ormandy	1970		Violinist, Conductor & Music Director of the Philadelphia Orchestra	
Adela Rogers St. Johns	1970		Journalist for Photoplay Magazine	
Jack Swigert	1970		Astronaut, Pilot & Apollo 13 Crew Member	
Manlio Brosio	1971		4th Secretary General of NATO	
Samuel Goldwyn	1971		Film Producer & Founder of Goldwyn Pictures & Samuel Goldwyn Productions	
William J. Hopkins	1971		Executive Clerk of the White House	
John Paul Vann	1972	†	Lieutenant Colonel of the United States Army & Member of the United States Agency for International Development	
Lila Acheson Wallace	1972		Philanthropist & Co-founder of Reader's Digest	
DeWitt Wallace	1972		Co-founder of Reader's Digest	
John Ford	1973		Film Director, Naval Officer & Head of the Photography Unit of the Office of Strategic Services	
William P. Rogers	1973		63rd United States Attorney General & 55th United States Secretary of State	
Paul G. Hoffman	1974		1st Administrator of the Economic Cooperation Administration & 1st Administrator of the United Nations Development Programme	
Melvin Laird	1974		10th United States Secretary of Defense & Member of the U.S. House of Representatives	
Charles Lowman	1974		Orthopedic Surgeon & Founder of California's First Orthopedic Hospital	

=== Awarded by Gerald Ford ===
Gerald Ford awarded 28 medals between 1974 and 1977.

Recipient	Year	Notes	Notable as	Ref.
David K. E. Bruce	1976	WD	U.S. Ambassador to France, Germany, the United Kingdom, the People's Republic of China & NATO	
Martha Graham	1976	WD	Modern Dancer, Choreographer & Inventor of the Graham Technique	
Jesse Owens	1976		Olympic Track and Field Athlete	
Arthur Rubinstein	1976	WD	Classical Pianist	
Iorwith Wilbur Abel	1977		3rd President of the United Steelworkers	
John Bardeen	1977		2x Nobel Prize Winning Physicist & Engineer	
Irving Berlin	1977		Composer & Songwriter	
Norman Borlaug	1977		Nobel Prize Winning Agronomist & Leader of the Green Revolution	
Omar Bradley	1977		Senior Officer of the United States Army & 1st Chairman of the Joint Chiefs of Staff	
Arleigh Burke	1977		Admiral of the United States Navy & Chief of Naval Operations	
Alexander Calder	1977	†	Mobiles Sculptor	
Bruce Catton	1977		Pulitzer Prize Winning Popular Historian of the American Civil War	
Joe DiMaggio	1977		Professional Baseball Player	
Ariel Durant	1977		Pulitzer Prize Winning Researcher & Writer	
Will Durant	1977		Pulitzer Prize Winning Historian & Philosopher	
Arthur Fiedler	1977		Conductor of the Boston Symphony Orchestra and Boston Pops Orchestra	
Henry Friendly	1977		Senior Judge of the United States Court of Appeals for the Second Circuit	
Lady Bird Johnson	1977		First Lady of the United States	
Henry Kissinger	1977	WD	56th United States Secretary of State & 7th United States National Security Advisor	
Archibald MacLeish	1977		Modernist Poet, 9th Librarian of Congress & 1st Assistant Secretary of State for Public Affairs	
James A. Michener	1977		Pulitzer Prize Winning Writer & Philanthropist	
Georgia O'Keeffe	1977		Modernist Artist & Painter	
Nelson Rockefeller	1977		41st Vice President of the United States & 49th Governor of New York	
Norman Rockwell	1977		Painter & Illustrator	
Donald Rumsfeld	1977	WD	13th and 21st United States Secretary of Defense & Member of the U.S. House of Representatives	
Catherine Filene Shouse	1977		Philanthropist, Member of the Women's Division of the U.S. Employment Service of the Department of Labor & First Woman appointed to the Democratic National Committee	
Lowell Thomas	1977		Writer, Broadcaster & Leading Investor of Capital Cities Television Corporation	
James Watson	1977		Nobel Prize Winning Molecular Biologist & Geneticist who Co-developed the Double Helix Structure Theory for the DNA Molecule	

=== Awarded by Jimmy Carter ===
Jimmy Carter awarded 34 medals between 1977 and 1981.

Recipient	Year	Notes	Notable as	Ref.
Martin Luther King Jr.	1977	†	Baptist Minister, Prominent Leader in the Civil Rights Movement & 1st President of the Southern Christian Leadership Conference	
Jonas Salk	1977		Virologist & Developer of the Polio Vaccine	
Arthur Goldberg	1978		9th United States Secretary of Labor, 6th U.S. Ambassador to the United Nations & Associate Justice of the Supreme Court of the United States	
Margaret Mead	1979	†	Cultural Anthropologist & President of the American Association for the Advancement of Science	
Ansel Adams	1980		Landscape Photographer & Environmentalist	
Horace M. Albright	1980		2nd Director of the National Park Service & Conservationist	
Rachel Carson	1980	†	Marine Biologist, Conservationist & Leader in the Global Environmental Movement	
Lucia Chase	1980		Ballet Director, Dancer & Co-founder of the American Ballet Theatre	
Hubert Humphrey	1980	†	38th Vice President of the United States & United States Senator from Minnesota	
Iakovos	1980		Primate of the Greek Orthodox Archdiocese of North and South America & Civil Rights Activist	
Lyndon B. Johnson	1980	†	36th President of the United States	
Clarence Mitchell Jr.	1980		Civil Rights Activist & Chief Lobbyist and National Director for NAACP	
Roger Tory Peterson	1980		Naturalist, Ornithologist & One of the Founding Inspiration of the Environmental Movement	
Hyman G. Rickover	1980		Admiral in the U.S. Navy & Director of the U.S. Naval Reactors Office	
Beverly Sills	1980		Operatic Soprano	
Robert Penn Warren	1980		Poet, Literary Critic, Co-founder of New Criticism & Charter Member of the Fellowship of Southern Writers	
John Wayne	1980	†	Actor	
Eudora Welty	1980		Pulitzer Prize Winning Novelist & Short Story Writer	
Tennessee Williams	1980		Playwright & Screenwriter	
Roger Nash Baldwin	1981		Co-founder and 1st Executive Director of the American Civil Liberties Union	
Harold Brown	1981		14th United States Secretary of Defense	
Zbigniew Brzezinski	1981		9th United States National Security Advisor	
Warren Christopher	1981		5th United States Deputy Secretary of State & 9th United States Deputy Attorney General	
Walter Cronkite	1981		Broadcast Journalist & Anchorman for CBS Evening News	
Kirk Douglas	1981		Actor & Philanthropist	
Margaret McNamara	1981		Founder of Reading Is Fundamental	
Karl Menninger	1981		Psychiatrist & Co-founder of the Menninger Foundation and Menninger Clinic	
Edmund Muskie	1981		58th United States Secretary of State & United States Senator from Maine	
Esther Peterson	1981		2nd Director of the Office of Consumer Affairs & 4th Director of the United States Women's Bureau	
Gerard C. Smith	1981		Chief U.S. Delegate to the Strategic Arms Limitation Talks & 1st U.S. Chairman of the Trilateral Commission	
Robert S. Strauss	1981		6th United States Trade Representative & United States Special Envoy for the Middle East	
Elbert Tuttle	1981		Senior Judge of the United States Court of Appeals for the Fifth Circuit	
Earl Warren	1981	†	14th Chief Justice of the United States	
Andrew Young	1981		Executive Director of the Southern Christian Leadership Conference & Member of the U.S. House of Representatives	

=== Awarded by Ronald Reagan ===
Ronald Reagan awarded 86 medals between 1981 and 1989.

Recipient	Year	Notes	Notable as	Ref.
Eubie Blake	1981		Jazz Pianist & Composer	
Ella Grasso	1981	†	83rd Governor of Connecticut & Member of the U.S. House of Representatives	
Bryce Harlow	1981		Counselor to the President	
Walter Judd	1981		Member of the U.S. House of Representatives	
Morris I. Leibman	1981		Civilian Aide-At-Large to the United States Army & Partner at Sidley Austin	
Tex Thornton	1981		Founder of Litton Industries	
Philip Habib	1982		9th Under Secretary of State for Political Affairs & 9th U.S. Ambassador to Korea	
Kate Smith	1982		Singer & Actor	
George Balanchine	1983		Ballet Choreographer & Co-founder of the New York City Ballet	
Clare Boothe Luce	1983		U.S. Ambassador to Italy & Member of the U.S. House of Representatives	
Bear Bryant	1983	†	College Football Player & Head Coach of the University of Alabama Football Team	
James Burnham	1983		Political Theorist, Philosopher, Chair of the Philosophy Department at New York University & Leader of the American Conservative Movement	
James E. Cheek	1983		President of Howard University	
Buckminster Fuller	1983		Architect, Systems Theorist, Inventor, Philosopher & Futurist	
Billy Graham	1983		Evangelist, Ordained Southern Baptist Minister & President of the Billy Graham Evangelistic Association	
Eric Hoffer	1983		Moral and Social Philosopher	
Jacob Javits	1983		United States Senator from New York & 58th Attorney General of New York	
Dumas Malone	1983		Pulitzer Prize Winning Historian & Biographer	
Mabel Mercer	1983		Cabaret Singer	
Simon Ramo	1983		Engineer considered to be the Father of the Intercontinental Ballistic Missile	
Howard Baker	1984		United States Senator from Tennessee	
Pierre Baruzy	1984		French boxing champion, industrialist, and WWII resistance member who saved Allied airmen.	
James Cagney	1984		Actor, Dancer & 6th President of the Screen Actors Guild	
Whittaker Chambers	1984	†	Journalist for Time Magazine, senior editor at National Review & Key Witness against the Ware Group during the Hiss Case for perjury	
Leo Cherne	1984		Head of the International Rescue Committee & Chair of the President's Intelligence Advisory Board	
Terence Cooke	1984	†	Cardinal of the Roman Catholic Church & Archbishop of New York	
Denton Cooley	1984		Heart and Cardiothoracic Surgeon & Founder and Surgeon-In-Chief of The Texas Heart Institute who performed the first Artificial Heart Implantation	
Tennessee Ernie Ford	1984		Country and Western Singer	
Héctor García	1984		Physician, World War II Veteran, Civil Rights Advocate & Founder of the American GI Forum	
Andrew Goodpaster	1984		United States Army General, Supreme Allied Commander Europe & Commander in Chief of the United States European Command	
Henry M. Jackson	1984	†	United States Senator from Washington & Member of the U.S. House of Representatives	
Lincoln Kirstein	1984		Writer, Impresario, Philanthropist & Co-founder of the New York City Ballet	
Louis L'Amour	1984		Novelist & Short Story Writer	
Joseph Luns	1984		5th Secretary General of NATO & Minister of Foreign Affairs	
Norman Vincent Peale	1984		Protestant Clergyman, Pastor of Marble Collegiate Church, New York & Author who popularized the concept of Positive Thinking	
Jackie Robinson	1984	†	Professional Baseball Player & Civil Rights Advocate	
Carlos P. Romulo	1984		President of the United Nations General Assembly & Co-founder of the Boy Scouts of the Philippines	
Anwar el-Sadat	1984	†	3rd President of Egypt	
Eunice Kennedy Shriver			Philanthropist & Founder of the Special Olympics	
Count Basie	1985	†	Jazz Pianist, Composer & Bandleader of the Count Basie Orchestra	
Albert Coady Wedemeyer	1985		United States Army Commander, General & Member of the War Planning Board which formulated plans for the Invasion of Normandy during World War II	
Jacques Cousteau	1985		French Naval Officer, Oceanographer & Co-Inventor of the Aqua-Lung	
Jerome H. Holland	1985	†	President of Delaware State College, 9th President of Hampton University & U.S. Ambassador to Sweden	
Sidney Hook	1985		Philosopher of the Pragmatist School	
Jeane Kirkpatrick	1985		16th U.S. Ambassador to the United Nations	
George Low	1985	†	14th President of Rensselaer Polytechnic Institute & 4th Deputy Administrator of NASA	
Paul Nitze	1985		12th United States Deputy Secretary of Defense & 58th United States Secretary of the Navy	
Frank Reynolds	1985	†	Television Journalist for CBS and ABC News	
Frank Sinatra	1985		Singer & Actor	
James Stewart	1985		Actor & Brigadier General	
Mother Teresa	1985		Catholic Nun, Humanitarian & Founder of the Missionaries of Charity	
Albert Wohlstetter	1985		Political Scientist influential to the U.S. Nuclear Strategy during the Cold War	
Roberta Wohlstetter	1985		Historian of American Military Intelligence	
Chuck Yeager	1985		United States Air Force Officer, Flying Ace & Record-Setting Test Pilot who was the First Confirmed Pilot in History to Exceed the Speed of Sound during Flight	
Walter Annenberg	1986		Businessman, Philanthropist, Owner of Triangle Publications & U.S. Ambassador to the United Kingdom	
Earl Blaik	1986		American football Player & Head Coach at Dartmouth College and the United States Military Academy	
Barry Goldwater	1986		United States Senator from Arizona & United States Air Force Officer	
Helen Hayes	1986		Actress	
Vladimir Horowitz	1986		Classical Pianist & Composer	
Matthew Ridgway	1986		United States Army Senior Officer, Supreme Allied Commander of Europe & 19th Chief of Staff of the United States Army	
Vermont C. Royster	1986		Editor of The Wall Street Journal	
Albert Sabin	1986		Medical Researcher, President of the Weizmann Institute of Science & Developer of the Oral Polio Vaccine	
Anne Armstrong	1987		First Female Counselor to the President, U.S. Ambassador to the United Kingdom & Chair of the President's Intelligence Advisory Board	
Justin Whitlock Dart Sr.	1987	†	President of Dart Industries & Executive Director of Store Industries for Walgreens	
Irving Kaufman	1987		Senior Judge of the United States Court of Appeals for the Second Circuit & District Judge of the United States District Court for the Southern District of New York	
Danny Kaye	1987	†	Actor, Comedian & Singer	
Lyman Lemnitzer	1987		United States Army General, 4th Chairman of the Joint Chiefs of Staff & Supreme Allied Commander Europe of NATO	
John A. McCone	1987		6th Director of Central Intelligence	
Frederick Patterson	1987		President of Tuskegee University & Founder of the United Negro College Fund	
Nathan Perlmutter	1987		4th Director of the Anti-Defamation League	
Mstislav Rostropovich	1987		Cellist, Conductor & Human Rights Advocate	
William B. Walsh	1987		Founder of Project HOPE (USA)	
Caspar Weinberger	1987	WD	15th United States Secretary of Defense & 10th United States Secretary of Health, Education, and Welfare	
Meredith Willson	1987	†	Flutist, Bandleader, Composer, Conductor & Playwright	
Pearl Bailey	1988		Broadway Actress & Singer	
Malcolm Baldrige Jr.	1988	†	25th United States Secretary of Commerce	
Irving Brown	1988		Trade Unionist & Leader of the American Federation of Labor and the AFL-CIO	
Warren E. Burger	1988		15th Chief Justice of the United States	
Peter Carington	1988		6th Secretary General of NATO & Secretary of State for Foreign and Commonwealth Affairs	
Edward DeBartolo	1988		Businessman & Real-Estate Developer	
Milton Friedman	1988		Economist & Statistician	
Jean MacArthur	1988		Philanthropist	
J. Willard Marriott	1988	†	Entrepreneur & Founder of the Marriott Corporation	
David Packard	1988		Co-founder, President, CEO and Chairman of the Board of Hewlett-Packard, 13th United States Deputy Secretary of Defense & President of the Uniformed Services University of the Health Sciences	
Roger L. Stevens	1988		Founding Chairman of the Kennedy Center for the Performing Arts and the National Endowment for the Arts	
Mike Mansfield	1989		United States Senator from Montana	
George Shultz	1989		60th United States Secretary of State	

=== Awarded by George H. W. Bush ===
George H. W. Bush awarded 38 medals between 1989 and 1993.

Recipient	Year	Notes	Notable as	Ref.
Lucille Ball	1989	†	Actress, Comedian & Producer	
C. Douglas Dillon	1989		57th United States Secretary of the Treasury & the U.S. Ambassador to France	
Jimmy Doolittle	1989		Military General & Commander of the Doolittle Raid	
George F. Kennan	1989		1st Director of Policy Planning & the U.S. Ambassador to the Soviet Union & Yugoslavia	
Claude Pepper	1989		Member of the U.S. House of Representatives & United States Senator from Florida	
Margaret Chase Smith	1989		United States Senator from Maine	
Lech Wałęsa	1989		Chairman of the Solidarity	
James Baker	1991		10th and 16th White House Chief of Staff	
William F. Buckley Jr.	1991		Founder of the National Review Magazine	
Dick Cheney	1991		17th United States Secretary of Defense, Member of the U.S. House of Representatives & future 46th Vice president of the United States	
Luis A. Ferré	1991		Governor of Puerto Rico	
Betty Ford	1991		First Lady of the United States	
Hanna Holborn Gray	1991		9th President of the University of Chicago	
Friedrich Hayek	1991		Economist & Legal Theorist	
Tip O'Neill	1991		47th Speaker of the U.S. House of Representatives	
Javier Pérez de Cuéllar	1991		Secretary General of the United Nations	
Colin Powell	1991		12th Chairman of the Joint Chiefs of Staff	
Norman Schwarzkopf Jr.	1991		Commander of the United States Central Command	
Brent Scowcroft	1991		8th and 16th United States National Security Advisor	
Leon Sullivan	1991		Baptist Minister & Civil Rights and Social Activist	
Margaret Thatcher	1991		Prime Minister of the United Kingdom	
Russell E. Train	1991		2nd Administrator of the Environmental Protection Agency	
Vernon A. Walters	1991		10th Deputy Director of Central Intelligence & the U.S. Ambassador to the United Nations, West Germany and Germany	
William Webster	1991		14th Director of Central Intelligence & the 3rd Director of the Federal Bureau of Investigation	
Ted Williams	1991		Professional Baseball Player	
David Brinkley	1992		Newscaster for NBC and ABC	
Johnny Carson	1992		Television Host	
Ella Fitzgerald	1992		Jazz Singer	
Audrey Hepburn	1992		Actress & Humanitarian	
Richard Petty	1992		Seven Time Champion of the NASCAR Cup Series, Seven Time Winner of the Daytona 500	
Harry W. Shlaudeman	1992		U.S. Ambassador to Venezuela, Peru, Argentina, Brazil and Nicaragua	
Isaac Stern	1992		Violinist	
John W. Vessey	1992		10th Chairman of the Joint Chiefs of Staff	
Sam Walton	1992		Founder of Walmart and Sam's Club	
Elie Wiesel	1992		Political Activist, Writer & Holocaust Survivor	
I. M. Pei	1992		Architect	
Ronald Reagan	1993	WD	40th President of the United States & Governor of California	
Strom Thurmond	1993		United States Senator from South Carolina	

=== Awarded by Bill Clinton ===
Bill Clinton awarded 89 medals between 1993 and 2001.

Recipient	Year	Notes	Notable as	Ref.
Arthur Ashe	1993	†	Professional Tennis Player	
William J. Brennan Jr.	1993		Associate Justice of the Supreme Court of the United States	
Marjory Stoneman Douglas	1993		Journalist, Woman's Suffrage Advocate & Conservationist	
J. William Fulbright	1993		United States Senator from Arkansas	
Thurgood Marshall	1993	†	Associate Justice of the Supreme Court of the United States & the Supreme Court's First African-American Justice	
Colin Powell	1993	WD	12th Chairman of the Joint Chiefs of Staff	
Joseph L. Rauh Jr.	1993	†	Civil Rights and Civil Liberties Lawyer	
Martha Raye	1993		Comic Actress & Singer	
John Minor Wisdom	1993		Senior Judge of the United States Court of Appeals for the Fifth Circuit	
Herbert L. Block	1994		Editorial Cartoonist	
Cesar Chavez	1994	†	Labor Leader, Civil Rights Activist & Co-founder of the National Farm Workers Association	
Arthur Sherwood Flemming	1994		3rd United States Secretary of Health, Education and Welfare	
James P. Grant	1994		Executive Director of the United Nations Children's Emergency Fund	
Dorothy Height	1994		Civil Rights and Women's Rights Activist & President of the National Council of Negro Women	
Barbara Jordan	1994		Member of the U.S. House of Representatives	
Lane Kirkland	1994		Labour Union Leader & President of AFL-CIO	
Robert H. Michel	1994		Member of the U.S. House of Representatives	
Sargent Shriver	1994		1st Director of the Peace Corps & Founder of the Job Corps, Head Start, VISTA and Upward Bound	
Peggy Charren	1995		Founder of Action for Children's Television	
William T. Coleman Jr.	1995		4th United States Secretary of Transportation	
John Hope Franklin	1995		President of Phi Beta Kappa, the Organization of American Historians, the American Historical Association and the Southern Historical Association	
Joan Ganz Cooney	1995		Founder of Sesame Workshop	
A. Leon Higginbotham Jr.	1995		Senior Judge of the United States Court of Appeals for the Third Circuit	
Frank Minis Johnson	1995		Senior Judge of the United States Court of Appeals for the Eleventh Circuit	
C. Everett Koop	1995		13th Surgeon General of the United States	
Gaylord Nelson	1995		United States Senator from Wisconsin	
Walter Reuther	1995	†	4th President of the United Automobile Workers	
James Rouse	1995		Founder of The Rouse Company	
Willie Velasquez	1995	†	Founder of the Southwest Voter Registration Education Project	
Lew Wasserman	1995		President of MCA Inc.	
Joseph Bernardin	1996		Cardinal of the Roman Catholic Church & Archbishop of Cincinnati & Chicago	
James Brady	1996		17th White House Press Secretary	
Millard Fuller	1996		Co-founder and President for Habitat For Humanity International	
David A. Hamburg	1996		President of the Carnegie Corporation of New York	
John H. Johnson	1996		Founder of the Johnson Publishing Company	
Eugene Lang	1996		Founder of REFAC Technology Development Corporation	
Jan Nowak-Jeziorański	1996		Polish Journalist & Writer	
Antonia Pantoja	1996		Founder of ASPIRA & Boricua College	
Rosa Parks	1996		Civil Rights Activist	
Ginetta Sagan	1996		Human Rights Activist	
Mo Udall	1996		Member of the U.S. House of Representatives	
Bob Dole	1997		United States Senator from Kansas	
William J. Perry	1997		19th United States Secretary of Defense	
John Shalikashvili	1997		13th Chairman of the Joint Chiefs of Staff & the Supreme Allied Commander Europe	
Arnold Aronson	1998		Founder of the Leadership Conference on Civil Rights	
Brooke Astor	1998		Philanthropist & Chairwoman of the Vincent Astor Foundation	
Robert Coles	1998		Child Psychiatrist & Professor at Harvard University	
Justin Dart Jr.	1998		Co-founder of the American Association of People with Disabilities	
James Farmer	1998		1st National Director of the Congress of Racial Equality	
Dante Fascell	1998		Member of the U.S. House of Representatives	
Zachary Fisher	1998		Philanthropist	
Frances Hesselbein	1998		CEO of the Girl Scouts of the USA	
Fred Korematsu	1998		Civil Rights Activist	
Sol Linowitz	1998		Diplomat & Lawyer	
Wilma Mankiller	1998		Principal Chief of the Cherokee Nation	
Margaret Murie	1998		Conservationist	
Mario G. Obledo	1998		Civil Rights Leader & 41st President of LULAC	
Elliot Richardson	1998		69th United States Attorney General	
David Rockefeller	1998		CEO of Chase Manhattan Corporation	
Albert Shanker	1998	†	President of the United Federation of Teachers and the American Federation of Teachers	
Elmo Zumwalt	1998		19th Chief of Naval Operations	
Lloyd Bentsen	1999		United States Senator from Texas & 69th United States Secretary of the Treasury	
Edgar Bronfman Sr.	1999		President of the World Jewish Congress	
Jimmy Carter	1999		39th President of the United States & Humanitarian	
Rosalynn Carter	1999		First Lady of the United States & Humanitarian	
Evelyn Dubrow	1999		Labour Lobbyist for the International Ladies' Garment Workers' Union	
Isolina Ferré	1999		Roman Catholic Religious Sister & Humanitarian	
Gerald Ford	1999		38th President of the United States	
Oliver Hill	1999		Civil Rights Attorney	
Max Kampelman	1999		Counselor of the United States Department of State	
Helmut Kohl	1999		Chancellor of Germany	
George J. Mitchell	1999		United States Special Envoy for Northern Ireland & United States Senator from Maine	
Edgar Wayburn	1999		Environmentalist & President of the Sierra Club	
James E. Burke	2000		CEO of Johnson & Johnson	
John Chafee	2000	†	United States Senator from Rhode Island	
Wesley Clark	2000		Supreme Allied Commander Europe of NATO	
William J. Crowe	2000		11th Chairman of the Joint Chiefs of Staff & the 29th U.S. Ambassador to the United Kingdom	
Marian Wright Edelman	2000		Founder and President of the Children's Defense Fund	
John Kenneth Galbraith	2000		7th U.S. Ambassador to India	
George G. Higgins	2000		Catholic Priest & Labor Activist	
Jesse Jackson	2000		Political Activist & United States Shadow Senator from the District of Columbia	
Mildred Jeffrey	2000		Political and Social Activist	
Mathilde Krim	2000		Founding Chairman of amfAR, the American Foundation for AIDS Research	
George McGovern	2000		United States Senator from South Dakota	
Daniel Patrick Moynihan	2000		United States Senator from New York	
Cruz Reynoso	2000		Associate Justice of the Supreme Court of California	
Aung San Suu Kyi	2000		General Secretary of the National League for Democracy	
Gardner C. Taylor	2000		Baptist Preacher	
Simon Wiesenthal	2000		Holocaust Survivor & Nazi Hunter	

=== Awarded by George W. Bush ===
George W. Bush awarded 82 medals between 2001 and 2009.

Recipient	Year	Notes	Notable as	Ref.
Hank Aaron	2002		Professional Baseball Player	
Bill Cosby	2002		Stand-Up Comedian & Actor	
Plácido Domingo	2002		Opera Singer & Conductor	
Peter Drucker	2002		Management Consultant & Educator	
Katharine Graham	2002	†	President of The Washington Post	
Donald Henderson	2002		Epidemiologist & Dean of the Johns Hopkins School of Public Health	
Irving Kristol	2002		Journalist & Godfather of Neoconservativism	
Nelson Mandela	2002		Anti-Apartheid Activist & President of South Africa	
Gordon Moore	2002		Co-founder and Chairman of Intel Corporation	
Nancy Reagan	2002		First Lady of the United States	
Fred Rogers	2002		Television Host & Presbyterian Minister	
A. M. Rosenthal	2002		Journalist & Executive Editor of The New York Times	
Robert Bartley	2003		Editor of the Editorial Page of The Wall Street Journal	
Jacques Barzun	2003		Historian	
Julia Child	2003		Cooking Teacher & Television Personality	
Roberto Clemente	2003	†	Professional Baseball Player	
Van Cliburn	2003		Pianist	
Václav Havel	2003		President of Czechoslovakia & the Czech Republic	
Charlton Heston	2003		Actor & Political Activist	
George Robertson	2003		10th Secretary General of NATO & Secretary of State for Defence	
Edward Teller	2003		Theoretical Physicist	
Dave Thomas	2003	†	Founder and CEO of Wendy's	
Byron White	2003	†	Professional Football Player & Associate Justice of the Supreme Court of the United States	
James Q. Wilson	2003		Political Scientist	
John Wooden	2003		Basketball Coach	
Paul Bremer	2004		Administrator of the Coalition Provisional Authority of Iraq	
Edward Brooke	2004		United States Senator from Massachusetts	
Doris Day	2004		Actress, Singer & Activist	
Tommy Franks	2004		Commander of the United States Central Command	
Vartan Gregorian	2004		12th President of the Carnegie Corporation of New York	
Gilbert Melville Grosvenor	2004		President and Chairman of the National Geographic Society	
Gordon B. Hinckley	2004		15th President of the Church of Jesus Christ of Latter-day Saints	
John Paul II	2004	WD	Pope	
Estée Lauder	2004		Co-founder of the Estée Lauder Companies	
Rita Moreno	2004		Actress, Dancer & Singer	
Arnold Palmer	2004		Professional Golfer	
Arnall Patz	2004		Medical Doctor & Research Professor at Johns Hopkins University	
Norman Podhoretz	2004		Magazine Editor & Writer for Commentary Magazine	
George Tenet	2004		18th Director of Central Intelligence	
Muhammad Ali	2005		Professional Boxer & Human Rights Activist	
Walter Wriston	2005		Chairman and CEO of Citicorp	
Carol Burnett	2005		Actress & Comedian	
Vint Cerf	2005		Co-Developer of the Transmission Control Protocol and the Internet Protocol	
Robert Conquest	2005		Historian & Poet	
Aretha Franklin	2005		Singer-Songwriter & Pianist	
Alan Greenspan	2005		13th Chair of the Federal Reserve	
Andy Griffith	2005		Actor & Comedian	
Paul Harvey	2005		Radio Broadcaster for ABC News Radio	
Bob Kahn	2005		Co-Developer of the Transmission Control Protocol and the Internet Protocol	
Sonny Montgomery	2005		Member of the U.S. House of Representatives & Major General of the Mississippi National Guard	
Richard Myers	2005		15th Chairman of the Joint Chiefs of Staff	
Jack Nicklaus	2005		Professional Golfer	
Frank Robinson	2005		Professional Baseball Player	
Paul Rusesabagina	2005		Rwandan politician & Manager of the Hôtel des Mille Collines in Kigali during the Rwandan Genocide protecting 1,268 Hutu and Tutsi refugees	
Ruth Johnson Colvin	2006		Founder of ProLiteracy Worldwide	
Norman Francis	2006		President of Xavier University of Louisiana	
Paul Johnson	2006		Journalist	
B.B. King	2006		Blues Singer-Songwriter	
Joshua Lederberg	2006		Molecular Biologist	
David McCullough	2006		Popular Historian	
Norman Mineta	2006		14th United States Secretary of Transportation & Member of the U.S. House of Representatives	
Buck O'Neil	2006	†	Professional Baseball Player	
William Safire	2006		Political Columnist for The New York Times	
Natan Sharansky	2006		Israeli Politician & Human Rights Activist	
Gary Becker	2007		Economist	
Óscar Elías Biscet	2007		Human Rights and Democratic Freedoms Advocate in Cuba	
Francis Collins	2007		2nd Director of the National Human Genome Research Institute	
Benjamin Hooks	2007		Executive Director of the National Association for the Advancement of Colored People	
Henry Hyde	2007		Member of the U.S. House of Representatives	
Brian Lamb	2007		Founder, Executive Chairman and CEO of C-SPAN	
Harper Lee	2007		Novelist & Civil Rights Activist	
Ellen Johnson Sirleaf	2007		24th President of Liberia	
Ben Carson	2008		Neurosurgeon & Director of Pediatric Neurosurgery at the Johns Hopkins Children's Center	
Anthony Fauci	2008		5th Director of the National Institute of Allergy and Infectious Diseases	
Tom Lantos	2008		Member of the U.S. House of Representatives	
Peter Pace	2008		16th Chairman of the Joint Chiefs of Staff	
Donna Shalala	2008		18th United States Secretary of Health and Human Services	
Laurence Silberman	2008		Senior Judge of the United States Court of Appeals for the District of Columbia Circuit	
Tony Blair	2009		Prime Minister of the United Kingdom	
Ryan Crocker	2009		United States Ambassador to Lebanon, Kuwait, Syria, Afghanistan, Pakistan & Iraq	
John Howard	2009		25th Prime Minister of Australia	
Álvaro Uribe	2009		31st President of Colombia	

=== Awarded by Barack Obama ===
Barack Obama awarded 118 medals between 2009 and 2017.

Recipient	Year	Notes	Notable as	Ref.
Nancy Brinker	2009		Founder of the Susan G. Komen Breast Cancer Foundation	
Joe Medicine Crow	2009		War Chief of the Crow Nation	
Pedro José Greer	2009		Physician & Founding Dean for the Roseman University Health Sciences College of Medicine	
Stephen Hawking	2009		Theoretical Physicist	
Jack Kemp	2009	†	Former U.S. Secretary of Housing and Urban Development	
Ted Kennedy	2009		United States Senator from Massachusetts	
Billie Jean King	2009		Professional Tennis Player and gender equality advocate	
Joseph Lowery	2009		Co-founder of the Southern Christian Leadership Conference	
Harvey Milk	2009	†	Member of the San Francisco Board of Supervisors & Gay Rights Activist	
Sandra Day O'Connor	2009		Associate Justice of the United States Supreme Court & the Supreme Court's First Female Justice	
Sidney Poitier	2009		Actor & First African-American & Bahamian to Win an Academy Award	
Chita Rivera	2009		Actress, Singer & Dancer	
Mary Robinson	2009		7th President of Ireland	
Janet Rowley	2009		Geneticist & First Scientist to Identify a Chromosomal Translocation as the Cause of Leukemia and other Cancers.	
Desmond Tutu	2009		Anglican Bishop, Theologian & Human Rights Activist	
Muhammad Yunus	2009		Founder of Grameen Bank	
John H. Adams	2011		Founder of the Natural Resources Defense Council	
Maya Angelou	2011		Poet & Civil Rights Activist	
Warren Buffett	2011		Philanthropist & CEO of Berkshire Hathaway	
George H. W. Bush	2011		41st President of the United States	
Robert Gates	2011		22nd United States Secretary of Defense	
Jasper Johns	2011		Abstract Expressionist Painter & Printmaker	
John Lewis	2011		Civil Rights Activist & Member of the U.S. House of Representatives	
Tom Little	2011	†	Optometrist & Leader of an International Assistance Mission killed during the 2010 Badakhshan Massacre	
Yo-Yo Ma	2011		Cellist & United Nations Messenger of Peace	
Sylvia Mendez	2011		Civil Rights Activist	
Angela Merkel	2011		Chancellor of Germany	
Stan Musial	2011		Professional Baseball Player	
Bill Russell	2011		Professional Basketball Player	
Jean Kennedy Smith	2011		United States Ambassador to Ireland	
John J. Sweeney	2011		President of AFL-CIO & Labor Leader	
Gerda Weissmann Klein	2011		Author, Human Rights Activist & Holocaust Educator	
Madeleine Albright	2012		64th United States Secretary of State	
Bob Dylan	2012		Singer-Songwriter	
William Foege	2012		10th Director of the Centers for Disease Control and Prevention	
John Glenn	2012		Astronaut and United States Senator from Ohio	
Juliette Gordon Low	2012	†	Founder of the Girl Scouts of the USA	
Gordon Hirabayashi	2012	†	Sociologist, Civil Rights Activist & Plaintiff in Hirabayashi v. United States	
Dolores Huerta	2012		Labor Leader & Co-founder of the National Farmworkers Association	
Jan Karski	2012	†	Resistance-Fighter during WWII & Diplomat	
Toni Morrison	2012		Novelist & Civil Rights Activist	
Shimon Peres	2012		9th President of Israel	
John Paul Stevens	2012		Associate Justice of the Supreme Court of the United States	
Pat Summitt	2012		Women's College Basketball Head Coach	
Patricia Wald	2012		Chief Judge of the United States Court of Appeals for the District of Columbia Circuit	
Ernie Banks	2013		Professional Baseball Player	
Ben Bradlee	2013		Executive Editor of The Washington Post	
Bill Clinton	2013		42nd President of the United States	
John Doar	2013		Lawyer & Lead Special Counsel for the U.S. House Judiciary Committee's Impeachment Inquiry Staff during the Impeachment Process Against Richard Nixon	
Daniel Inouye	2013	†	United States Senator from Hawaii	
Daniel Kahneman	2013		Psychologist & Economist	
Richard Lugar	2013		United States Senator from Indiana	
Loretta Lynn	2013		Singer-Songwriter	
Mario J. Molina	2013		Chemist who discovered the Antarctic Ozone Hole	
Sally Ride	2013	†	Astronaut & Physicist	
Bayard Rustin	2013	†	Human Rights Activist	
Arturo Sandoval	2013		Jazz Trumpeter, Pianist & Composer	
Dean Smith	2013		Men's College Basketball Head Coach	
Gloria Steinem	2013		Journalist & Social Political Activist	
C. T. Vivian	2013		Minister & Civil Rights Activist	
Oprah Winfrey	2013		Talk Show Host, Actress & Philanthropist	
Alvin Ailey	2014	†	Dancer & Founder of the Alvin Ailey American Dance Theater	
Isabel Allende	2014		Author	
Tom Brokaw	2014		Network Television Journalist	
James Chaney	2014	†	Civil Rights Activist	
John Dingell	2014		Member of the U.S. House of Representatives	
Mildred Dresselhaus	2014		Nanotechnologist & Institute Professor at the Massachusetts Institute of Technology	
Andrew Goodman	2014	†	Civil Rights Activist	
Ethel Kennedy	2014		Human Rights Activist & Founder of the Robert F. Kennedy Center for Justice and Human Rights	
Abner Mikva	2014		Chief Judge of the United States Court of Appeals for the District of Columbia Circuit	
Patsy Mink	2014	†	Member of the U.S. House of Representatives	
Edward Roybal	2014	†	Member of the U.S. House of Representatives	
Michael Schwerner	2014	†	Civil Rights Activist	
Suzan Shown Harjo	2014		President of the National Council of American Indians	
Charlie Sifford	2014		Professional Golfer & the First African-American to play on the PGA Tour	
Robert Solow	2014		Economist & Institute Professor at the Massachusetts Institute of Technology	
Meryl Streep	2014		Actress	
Marlo Thomas	2014		Actress, Producer & Social Activist	
Stevie Wonder	2014		Singer-Songwriter	
Steven Spielberg	2015		Director, Producer & Screenwriter	
Emilio Estefan	2015		Musician & Producer	
Gloria Estefan	2015		Singer & Actress	
Itzhak Perlman	2015		Violinist & Conductor	
Stephen Sondheim	2015		Composer & Lyricist of Musical Theater	
Barbra Streisand	2015		Singer & Actress	
James Taylor	2015		Singer-Songwriter	
Minoru Yasui	2015	†	Lawyer & Plaintiff in Yasui v. United States	
Billy Frank Jr.	2015	†	Environmental Leader & Treaty Rights Activist	
Shirley Chisholm	2015	†	Member of the U.S. House of Representatives & First African-American Woman Elected to Congress	
Lee H. Hamilton	2015		Member of the U.S. House of Representatives	
Barbara Mikulski	2015		United States Senator from Maryland	
William Ruckelshaus	2015		1st & 5th Administrator of the Environmental Protection Agency	
Katherine Johnson	2015		Mathematician whose calculations helped with the first successful U.S. Crewed Spaceflight	
Yogi Berra	2015	†	Professional Baseball Player	
Bonnie Carroll	2015		Founder and President of the Tragedy Assistance Program for Survivors	
Willie Mays	2015		Professional Baseball Player	
Frank Gehry	2016		Architect	
Richard Garwin	2016		Physicist & Author of the First Hydrogen Bomb Design	
Maya Lin	2016		Designer of the Vietnam Veterans Memorial in Washington D.C.	
Robert Redford	2016		Actor & Filmmaker	
Robert De Niro	2016		Actor & Producer	
Tom Hanks	2016		Actor	
Cicely Tyson	2016		Actress	
Diana Ross	2016		Singer & Actress	
Bruce Springsteen	2016		Singer-Songwriter	
Grace Hopper	2016	†	Computer Scientist & Developer of the FLOW-MATIC programming language	
Margaret Hamilton	2016		Director of the Software Engineering Division of the MIT Instrumentation Laboratory	
Eduardo J. Padrón	2016		President of Miami Dade College	
Newton N. Minow	2016		Chairman of the Federal Communications Commission	
Lorne Michaels	2016		Comedian & Film and Television Producer	
Ellen DeGeneres	2016		Comedian, Television Host & Gay Rights Activist	
Bill Gates	2016		Philanthropist & Co-founder of Microsoft	
Melinda French Gates	2016		Philanthropist & Co-founder of the Bill & Melinda Gates Foundation	
Elouise P. Cobell	2016	†	Tribal Elder, Activist & Lead Plaintiff in Cobell v. Salazar	
Vin Scully	2016		Sportscaster	
Kareem Abdul-Jabbar	2016		Professional Basketball Player	
Michael Jordan	2016		Professional Basketball Player	
Joe Biden	2017	WD	47th Vice President of the United States, United States Senator from Delaware	

=== Awarded by Donald Trump (first term) ===
During his first term, Donald Trump awarded 24 medals between 2017 and 2021.

Recipient	Year	Notes	Notable as	Ref.
Miriam Adelson	2018		Physician and philanthropist	
Orrin Hatch	2018		United States Senator from Utah	
Alan Page	2018		Associate Justice of the Minnesota Supreme Court and football player	
Elvis Presley	2018	†	Singer and actor known as the "King of Rock and Roll"	
Babe Ruth	2018	†	Professional baseball player	
Antonin Scalia	2018	†	Associate Justice of the Supreme Court of the United States	
Roger Staubach	2018		Professional football player	
Bob Cousy	2019		Professional basketball player	
Arthur Laffer	2019		Economist, best known for the Laffer curve	
Edwin Meese	2019		75th United States Attorney General	
Roger Penske	2019		Professional auto racing team owner, driver, and businessman	
Mariano Rivera	2019		Professional baseball player	
Jerry West	2019		Basketball executive and Olympic professional basketball player	
Tiger Woods	2019		Professional golfer	
Dan Gable	2020		Olympic wrestler	
Lou Holtz	2020		University football coach	
Jack Keane	2020		Vice Chief of Staff of the United States Army	
Rush Limbaugh	2020	(Note: Awarded during 2020 State of the Union Address.)	Political commentator	
Jim Ryun	2020		Member of the U.S. House of Representatives and Olympic athlete	
Babe Didrikson Zaharias	2021	†	Olympic athlete	
Devin Nunes	2021		Member of the U.S. House of Representatives from California	
Jim Jordan	2021		Member of the U.S. House of Representatives from Ohio	
Gary Player	2021		Professional golfer	
Annika Sörenstam	2021		Professional golfer	

=== Awarded by Joe Biden ===
Joe Biden awarded 57 medals between 2022 and 2025.

Recipient	Year	Notes	Notable as	Ref.
Simone Biles	2022		Olympic gymnast	
Simone Campbell	2022		Roman Catholic religious sister & Member of the Sisters of Social Service	
Julieta García	2022		President of Texas Southmost College	
Gabrielle Giffords	2022		Member of the U.S. House of Representatives from Arizona & gun control activist	
Fred Gray	2022		Civil rights attorney & state legislator	
Steve Jobs	2022	†	Entrepreneur & co-founder and CEO of Apple	
Alexander Karloutsos	2022		Protopresbyter in the Greek Orthodox Archdiocese of America	
Khizr Khan	2022		Member of the U.S. Commission on International Religious Freedom & activist	
Sandra Lindsay	2022		Critical Care Nurse & First American to receive the COVID-19 Vaccine	
John McCain	2022	†	United States Senator from Arizona & Purple Heart recipient	
Diane Nash	2022		Civil rights activist & Co-founder of the Student Nonviolent Coordinating Committee	
Megan Rapinoe	2022		Olympic professional soccer player & human rights activist	
Alan Simpson	2022		United States Senator from Wyoming	
Richard Trumka	2022	†	Organized labor leader	
Wilma Vaught	2022		Brigadier General, U.S. Air Force	
Raul Yzaguirre	2022		U.S. Ambassador to the Dominican Republic & President and CEO of the National Council of La Raza	
Michael Bloomberg	2024		Entrepreneur, philanthropist and Mayor of New York City	
Greg Boyle	2024		Jesuit Catholic priest & Founder and director of the rehabilitation program Homeboy Industries	
Jim Clyburn	2024		Member of the U.S. House of Representatives from South Carolina	
Elizabeth Dole	2024		United States Senator from North Carolina, Transportation Secretary, and Labor Secretary	
Phil Donahue	2024		Former daytime talk show host	
Medgar Evers	2024	†	Civil rights activist who was murdered at age 37 in 1963	
Al Gore	2024		45th Vice President of the United States and environmentalist	
Clarence B. Jones	2024		Civil rights activist	
John Kerry	2024		U.S. Special Presidential Envoy for Climate, U.S. Secretary of State and United States Senator from Massachusetts.	
Frank Lautenberg	2024	†	United States Senator from New Jersey	
Katie Ledecky	2024		Olympic swimmer	
Opal Lee	2024		Educator and activist who pushed to make Juneteenth a national holiday	
Ellen Ochoa	2024		Astronaut	
Nancy Pelosi	2024		52nd and first female Speaker of the United States House of Representatives	
Jane Rigby	2024		Astrophysicist	
Teresa Romero	2024		President of the United Farm Workers union	
Judy Shepard	2024		Co-founder of the Matthew Shepard Foundation	
Jim Thorpe	2024	†	First Native American to win an Olympic gold medal	
Michelle Yeoh	2024		Actress and activist who also became the first person of Asian descent to win an Academy Award for Best Actress	
Jens Stoltenberg	2024		13th Secretary General of NATO & 34th Prime Minister of Norway	
Cecile Richards	2024		Activist and President of Planned Parenthood	
José Andrés	2025		Spanish-American chef, founder of World Central Kitchen	
Bono	2025		Frontman of U2 and activist against AIDS and poverty	
Ash Carter	2025	†	25th Secretary of Defense	
Hillary Clinton	2025		Former First Lady, Senator, and Secretary of State	
Michael J. Fox	2025		Actor and advocate for Parkinson's disease research	
Tim Gill	2025		Computer programmer and LGBTQ activist	
Jane Goodall	2025		Ethologist and conservationist	
Fannie Lou Hamer	2025	†	Civil rights activist	
Magic Johnson	2025		Professional basketball player	
Robert F. Kennedy	2025	†	Attorney General	
Ralph Lauren	2025		Fashion designer	
Lionel Messi	2025	(Note: Messi was unable to attend the ceremony due to prior commitments.)	Professional soccer player	
Bill Nye	2025		Science communicator and TV presenter	
George W. Romney	2025	†	43rd Governor of Michigan and 3rd Secretary of Housing and Urban Development	
David M. Rubenstein	2025		Co-founder of The Carlyle Group	
George Soros	2025		Investor and philanthropist	
George Stevens Jr.	2025		Founder of the American Film Institute	
Denzel Washington	2025	(Note: Washington was supposed to receive the award in 2022 but had to skip the ceremony after testing positive for COVID-19.)	Actor, producer & director	
Anna Wintour	2025		Chief editor at Vogue	
Pope Francis	2025	WD	Pope of the Catholic Church from 2013 to 2025	

=== Awarded by Donald Trump (second term) ===
During his second term, Donald Trump has awarded two medals and has announced four.

Recipient	Year	Notes	Notable as	Ref.
Charlie Kirk	2025	†	American conservative political activist and co-founder of Turning Point USA, assassinated in 2025	
Welles Crowther	2026	†	Volunteer firefighter and former Boston College Lacrosse player who saved at least 18 lives during the September 11 attacks	
Rudy Giuliani	TBD	Announced in 2025, not yet awarded.	108th Mayor of New York City, Former United States Attorney for the Southern District of New York, former legal representative of Donald Trump	
Ben Carson	TBD	Announced in 2025, not yet awarded.	Neurosurgeon, author, 17th United States Secretary of Housing and Urban Development.	
Connor Hellebuyck	TBD	Announced in 2026, not yet awarded.	National Hockey League goaltender for the New Jersey Devils, 2026 Winter Olympics gold medalist	
Roger Clemens	TBD	Announced in 2026, not yet awarded.	A former MLB pitcher who played 24 seasons	

== See also ==
- List of Congressional Gold Medal recipients

== Bibliography ==
- Wetterau, Bruce (1996). The Presidential Medal of Freedom: Winners and Their Achievements. Congressional Quarterly. p. 513. ISBN 978-1-56802-128-7. – contains a list of awardees from 1963 to approximately 1995
