= William J. Hopkins =

William J. Hopkins may refer to:

- William Hopkins (architect) (1820–1901), British architect
- William J. Hopkins (civil servant) (1910–2004), American civil servant
