= William H. Crook =

Bodyguard for President Abraham Lincoln and long-time White House employee

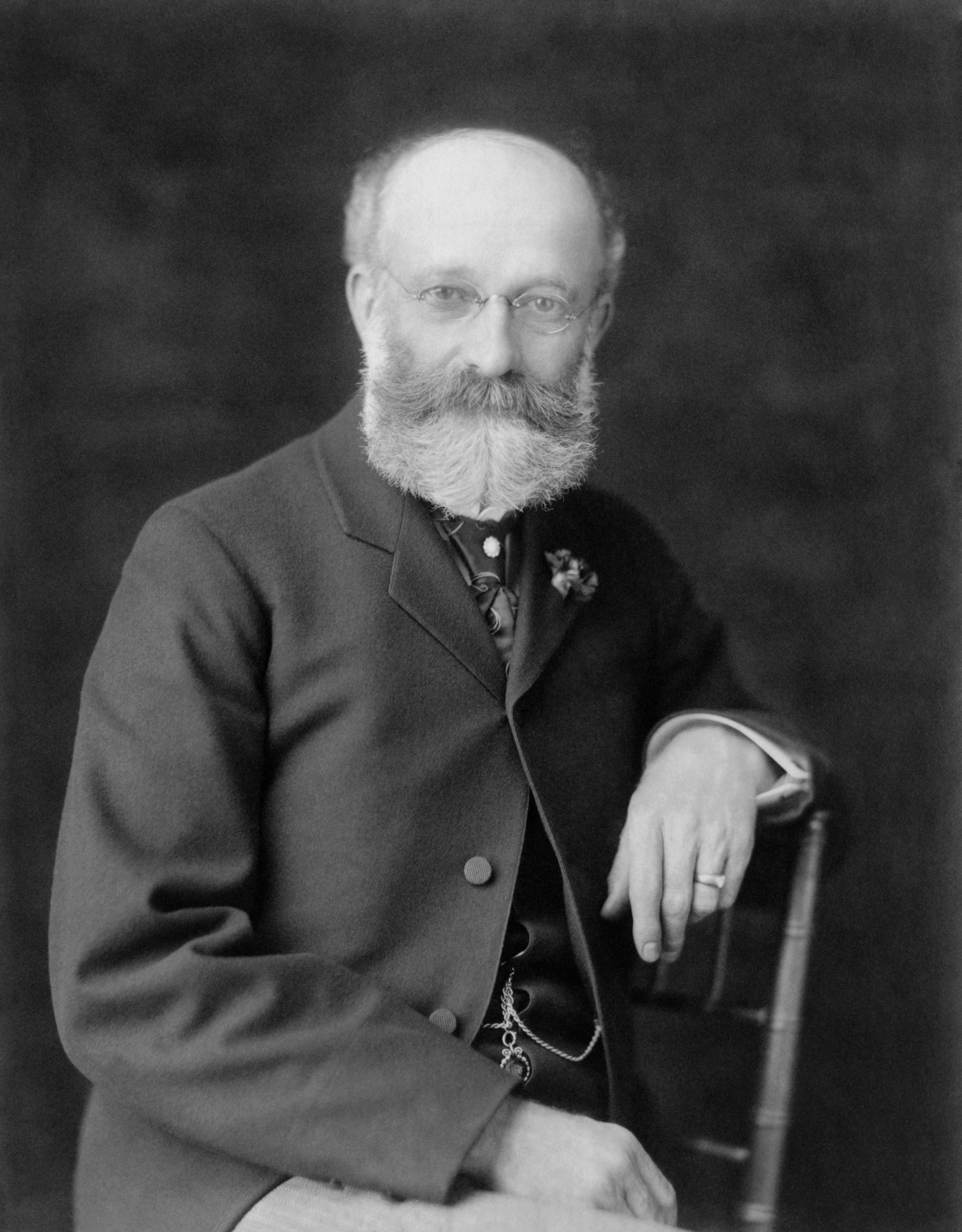
- Photograph of William H. Crook by Frances Benjamin Johnston, c. 1900

Executive Clerk of the President of the United States
- In office December 20, 1870 – 1910
- President: Ulysses S. Grant
- Succeeded by: Rudolph Forster

Personal details
- Born: William Henry Crook; October 15, 1839 Prince George's County, Maryland, U.S.
- Died: March 13, 1915 (aged 75) Washington, D.C., U.S.
- Resting place: Arlington National Cemetery, Arlington County, Virginia
- Spouses: Jane Catherine Rodbird (m. 1863; died 1895); Clara Robey (m. 1899; died 1911)
- Children: 1 son

William Henry Crook (October 15, 1839 – March 13, 1915) was one of President Abraham Lincoln's bodyguards in 1865. After Lincoln's assassination (while Crook was off duty), he continued to work in the White House for a total of more than 50 years, serving 12 presidents.

== Career ==
Even during the height of the American Civil War, presidential security was lax. Throngs of people entered the White House every day. "The entrance doors and all the doors on the Pennsylvania side of the mansion were open at all hours of the day and, often, very late into the evening." Lincoln finally gave in to concerns for his safety in November 1864, and was assigned four around-the-clock bodyguards. When one was reassigned as the White House doorkeeper, Crook, then a member of the Washington Police Force and a former Union army soldier, was selected as his replacement, beginning January 4, 1865. Lincoln's son Tad had a speech impediment and referred to Crook as "Took". When Crook was later drafted, he went to see the president, who arranged to keep his services.

On April 14, 1865, Crook began his shift at 8 a.m. He was to have been relieved by John Frederick Parker at 4 p.m., but Parker was several hours late. Lincoln had told Crook that he had been having dreams of his being assassinated for three straight nights. Crook tried to persuade the president not to attend a performance of a play, Our American Cousin, at Ford's Theatre that night, or at least allow him to go along as an extra bodyguard, but Lincoln said he had promised his wife they would go. As Lincoln left for the theater, he turned to Crook and said, "Goodbye, Crook". Before, Lincoln had always said, "Good night, Crook". Crook later recalled: "It was the first time that he neglected to say 'Good Night' to me and it was the only time that he ever said 'Good-bye'. I thought of it at that moment and, a few hours later, when the news flashed over Washington that he had been shot, his last words were so burned into my being that they can never be forgotten." Crook blamed Parker, who had left his post at the theater without permission to watch the show.

Crook also served as a bodyguard for Lincoln's successor, Andrew Johnson. It was he who brought the news to the embattled president that he had been acquitted in his impeachment trial in May 1868.

When his good friend, Ulysses S. Grant, became president, he appointed Crook "Executive Clerk of the President of the United States" in 1870, and "Chief Disbursing Officer" in 1877, the latter the position he would hold for the rest of his career. On January 5, 1915, President Woodrow Wilson and the members of the White House staff celebrated his 50 years of service and presented him with a cane.

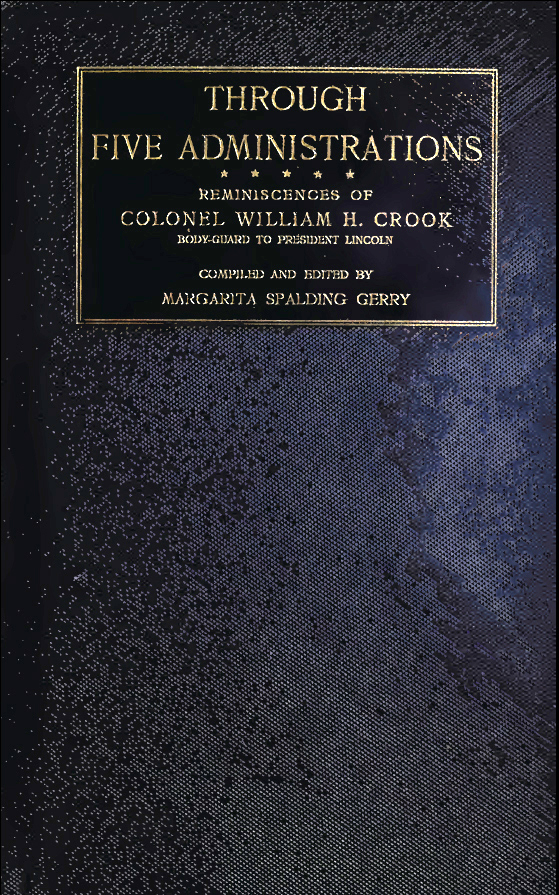
Cover of Through Five Administrations

Crook set his memoirs down on paper in the book Through Five Administrations: Reminiscences of Colonel William H. Crook, Body-Guard to President Lincoln, compiled and edited by Margarita Spalding Gerry. There are six administrations covered, however, from Lincoln to Chester A. Arthur, although James A. Garfield and Arthur are dealt with in a single chapter.

== Death ==
Crook died at his boarding house in 1915. He was predeceased by his wives, Jane Catherine Rodbird (1846–1895), and Clara Robey (1855–1911). He was buried at Arlington National Cemetery; President Wilson attended the funeral.
