= Ruth Johnson Colvin =

American literacy advocate (1916–2024)

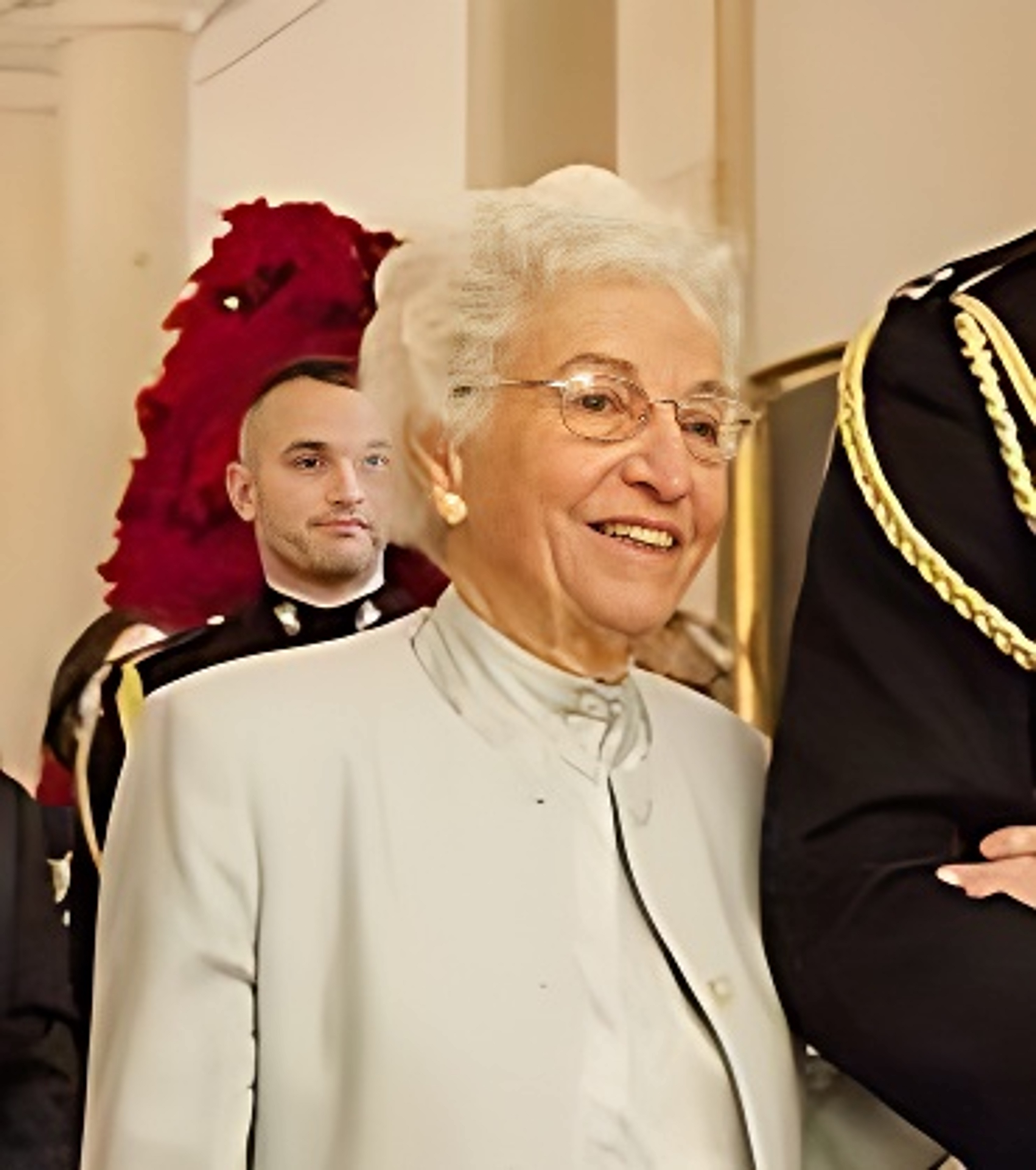
- Colvin in 2006
- Born: Ruth Johnson; December 16, 1916; Chicago, Illinois, U.S.
- Died: August 18, 2024 (aged 107); Syracuse, New York, U.S.
- Education: Syracuse University
- Known for: Founding of Literacy Volunteers of America
- Spouse: Robert Colvin (m. 1940; died 2014)
- Children: 2

Ruth Johnson Colvin (December 16, 1916 – August 18, 2024) was an American philanthropist who was the founder of the non-profit organization Literacy Volunteers of America, now called ProLiteracy Worldwide in Syracuse, New York, in 1962. She was awarded the Presidential Medal of Freedom by President George W. Bush in December 2006.

== Early years ==
Ruth Johnson was born in Chicago on December 16, 1916. She was the daughter of Lillian Johnson and Harry Johnson (1891–1929), a Swedish-American, and owner of a construction conglomerate in Chicago. She was eldest of five children.

She attended Thornton Junior College in Harvey, Illinois, where she received a two-year degree. She also attended Moser Business College in Chicago and Northwestern University in Evanston, Illinois, where she met her future husband, Robert Colvin, who was majoring in business administration at Northwestern. She also became a member of the Kappa Delta chapter.

She and Robert married in 1940. They moved to Seattle, Washington, then Syracuse, New York, where he built a "lucrative sales and consulting career" around industrial chemicals. Together, the couple had two children.

She earned a Bachelor of Science degree from Syracuse University in 1959.

== Career ==
Colvin became aware of the problem of illiteracy in her hometown of Syracuse when the 1960 census reports were released in 1962; she learned that the city had over 11,000 people functioning at the lowest level of literacy. Always an avid reader herself, she worked with reading specialists at Syracuse University and developed materials to train volunteer tutors various motivation and instruction techniques. She developed two tutor training manuals, Tutor and I Speak English, which are considered to be authoritative sources for training volunteer tutors to teach adults basic literacy or English as a second language. The first tutors who completed the program were from Colvin's church women's group.

=== Literacy Volunteers ===
In 1962, Literacy Volunteers, Inc. was founded in Syracuse. The organization was chartered in New York State in 1967 as a tax-exempt non-profit, and the name was changed to Literacy Volunteers of America, Inc. (LVA). It is a national, educational, non-profit organization with staff at the local, state and national levels and a volunteer board of directors. Colvin was the first president of the organization and a lifetime member of the board of directors.

In 1974, she created the English as a Second Language training program as well as a new reading series for learners. During the next few years she helped found the National Coalition for Literacy to increase public awareness of illiteracy. Colvin also published Student Involvement Guidelines to encourage student involvement in all aspects of literacy programs.

The organization currently has 330 programs in 42 states with over 100,000 volunteers and students. The non-profit works in conjunction with correctional facilities, adult educational programs, libraries, universities, community service programs and industry.

The non-profit looks for effective ways to teach basic literacy and English as a second language which stresses the importance of educationally sound "learner-centered" training of tutors and "ongoing support system."

From 1991 to 2001, Colvin helped with administration, training and fund development in Swaziland, in the development of the country's only literacy program. She also assessed needs and gave initial training for the Rotary Clubs of Zambia, to set up the Readers are Leaders in Zambia fund.

=== ProLiteracy worldwide ===
ProLiteracy Worldwide was formed when Laubach Literacy International and Literacy Volunteers of America, Inc. merged in 2002.

Laubach Literacy International began in 1930, when Dr. Frank C. Laubach was a missionary among the Maranao people of the Philippines. His concern about their poor living conditions led him to conclude that the ability to read and write was essential for them to begin to solve their problems. As the Maranaos learned to read, they would, in turn, teach other adults on a one-to-one basis that became known as "Each One Teach One." From 1935 to 1967, Laubach visited 105 countries answering calls for literacy help and created reading lessons in 315 languages. He founded Laubach Literacy International in Syracuse in 1955.

=== Civic contributions ===
By 1977, Colvin was on the board of directors of the Syracuse Boy's Club and Consolidated Industries. She was also active in Volunteers of Greater Syracuse.

=== Presidential medal of freedom ===
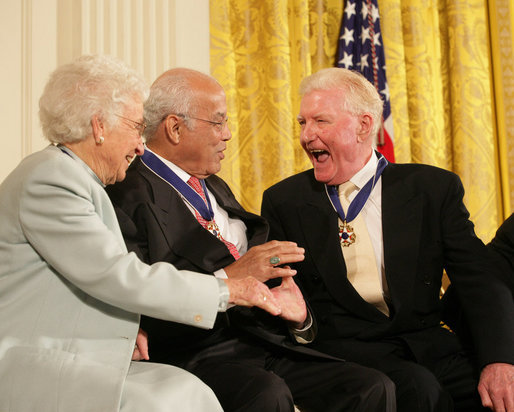
Colvin with Norman C. Francis (center) and Paul Johnson (right) at the White House in December 2006

Colvin was presented with the Presidential Medal of Freedom by President George W. Bush on December 15, 2006, in the East Room of the White House. The president noted that "Ruth Colvin is a person of intelligence and vision and heart. And she has earned the gratitude of many, and the admiration of us all."

=== Published works ===
- Tutor (1962)
- I Speak English (1962)
- Student Involvement Guidelines
- Basic Reading Workshop (video)
- Tutoring Small Groups Handbook
- Reading to Children (video)
- English as a Second Language Tutor Training Workshop
- How to Add Family Literacy to Your Program
- Maintaining the Balance: A Guide to 50/50 Management
- LVA Works: A Guide to Workplace Education
- Great Traveling After 55 (1989)
- Off the Beaten Path: Stories of People Around the World (2011)
- My Travels Through Life, Love, and Literacy: A Memoir (2020)

== Later years ==
Colvin remained active in ProLiteracy Worldwide as a volunteer tutor in the United States and abroad. She started literacy programs in Madagascar, Papua New Guinea, and Tok Pisin. She also taught in developing countries such as Madagascar, Papua New Guinea, Zambia, Guatemala, Pakistan, Somalia and China.

In China, Colvin trained teachers to incorporate conversational English in their classes. In Papua New Guinea, she initiated a literacy program, trained teachers, and wrote literacy training books in Tok Pisin. She taught ten Cambodian women to teach another 103 village women who had no formal schooling. She also trained teachers in Madagascar to teach locals English. She was invited to return to the area to start a literacy program in Malagasy.

She was a life member of ProLiteracy's board of directors.

In 2018, Colvin was chosen as commencement speaker at Le Moyne College.

== Personal life and death ==
Colvin lived in Syracuse, New York.

Her husband, Robert, died in 2014.

She turned 100 in December 2016, and died at her home on August 18, 2024, at the age of 107.

== Recognition and awards ==
Colvin had over 40 years of literacy experience and published nine books. She received 29 awards and honors for her efforts, as well as "hundreds of people stories" from the 60 countries she either worked in or visited. She received nine honorary doctorates of humane letter degrees, including one in May 1983, from her alma mater, Syracuse University.

In 1987, she received the President's Volunteer Action Award from President Ronald Reagan, the highest award given to a volunteer.

She was the recipient of numerous awards in addition to the Presidential Medal of Freedom in 2006, including the Women's Day National Award, the International Center Goodwill Ambassador Award, the Rotarian International Harris Fellow, the NE Synod Presbyterian Ecumenical Award, the President's Volunteers Action Award, and the LVA President's Special Service Award. In 1993, she was inducted into the National Women's Hall of Fame.

Colvin was inducted into sorority Kappa Delta's Hall of Honor, the highest honor the society bestows on its members.

On May 20, 2018, Colvin gave the commencement address at Le Moyne College in Syracuse, New York, and was awarded an honorary doctorate. She may be the oldest individual ever to have addressed a graduation ceremony in the United States.
