= J. Clifford MacDonald =

American businessman and philanthropist (1901-1963)

- Born: 12 October 1901; Alexandria, Louisiana
- Died: 16 August 1963 (aged 61); Tampa, Florida
- Occupation: Businessman
- Title: Arc of the United States (owner and president)

Jackson Clifford MacDonald (October 12, 1901 — August 16, 1963) was an American businessman and philanthropist. MacDonald was owner of a printing company and served as president of the Arc of the United States, then named the National Association for Retarded Children. While working with people with disabilities, MacDonald started several Floridan establishments and worked with the Hillsborough County Association for the Blind as their president from 1938 to 1954. Apart from disabilities, MacDonald worked in journalism with the New York Daily News, Tampa Tribune, St. Petersburg Times and the St. Petersburg Independent during the 1920s. MacDonald was named a recipient of the Presidential Medal of Freedom in 1963 and died before his award ceremony that year.

== Biography ==
On October 12, 1901, MacDonald was born in Alexandria, Louisiana. When MacDonald was a toddler, he was raised by his mother after his father died. During his childhood, MacDonald lived in California and New York. For his post-secondary education, MacDonald went to Columbia University for a journalism program.

For his career, MacDonald worked for the New York Daily News in the 1920s before moving to the Tampa Tribune in 1924. While in Florida, MacDonald continued his journalism career in St. Petersburg, Florida with the St. Petersburg Times and the St. Petersburg Independent. Apart from reporting, MacDonald started The Spectator and the St. Petersburg Daily News during the mid 1920s. From 1926 to 1959, MacDonald was in charge of the MacDonald Printing Company in Tampa.

Working with people with disabilities, MacDonald joined the Hillsborough County Association for the Blind as their president in 1938. He remained as their president until 1954. During this time period, MacDonald became a member of the Florida Cooperative for the Blind as their president in 1949. Throughout the early to mid 1950s, the Hillsborough Country Association for Retarded Children and the MacDonald Training Center were established by MacDonald. After launching the Florida State Council for Retarded Children, MacDonald worked for the National Association for Retarded Children during the mid to late 1950s as their president.

In 1963, MacDonald received the Presidential Medal of Freedom. President Lyndon B. Johnson said of MacDonald, upon issuing him the honor: "Businessman and philanthropist, he has directed his concern to the quiet but noble work of enlarging the lives and opportunities of the physically and mentally handicapped." President John F. Kennedy awarded MacDonald the Presidential Medal via executive order, on February 22, 1963. However, both MacDonald and Kennedy died prior to the December 6, 1963 ceremony.

MacDonald died on August 16, 1963, in Tampa, Florida from a stroke. He had a previous stroke several years before his death. Following his death, MacDonald's wife accepted his President Medal of Freedom posthumously. MacDonald was married and had a child with an intellectual disability.
