= ProLiteracy =

International nonprofit organization

ProLiteracy, also known as ProLiteracy Worldwide, is an international nonprofit organization that supports literacy programs that help adults learn to read and write. Based in Syracuse, New York, ProLiteracy has slightly less than 1,000 member programs in the U.S. and works with 21 partners in 35 developing countries.

== History ==
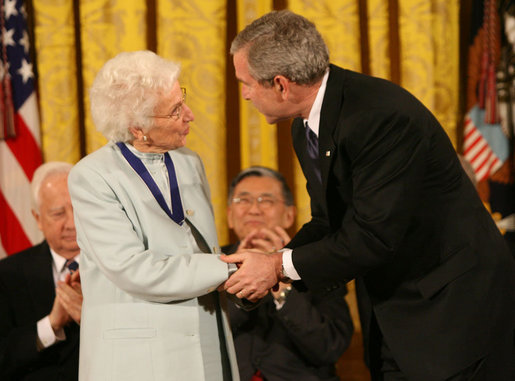
Ruth Johnson Colvin with President George W. Bush receiving the Presidential Medal of Freedom on December 15, 2006

ProLiteracy was formed when Laubach Literacy International and Literacy Volunteers of America, Inc. merged in 2002.

Laubach Literacy International’s history began in 1930, when Dr. Frank C. Laubach, missionary among the Maranao people of the Philippines, began teaching the people of Mindanao to read and write in their own language. From 1935 to 1967, Dr. Laubach visited 105 countries answering calls for literacy help and created reading lessons in 315 languages. He founded Laubach Literacy International in Syracuse, New York, in 1955.

Literacy Volunteers of America was founded in 1962 by Ruth Johnson Colvin, who developed a means to train volunteers to tutor adults.

== Overview ==
ProLiteracy’s work falls into three categories: programs, publishing, and development.

ProLiteracy's Programs division works in the U.S. and abroad. ProLiteracy has grassroots partner programs in developing countries in Asia, Africa, Latin America, and the Middle East. ProLiteracy provides training, technical assistance, and targeted local grants to support tailored programs that combine literacy with economic self-reliance, health, education, peace, human rights, and environmental sustainability projects.

In the U.S., ProLiteracy represents about 1,000 community-based volunteer and adult basic education affiliates in 49 states and the District of Columbia. ProLiteracy supports member programs with technical assistance and program and professional development services online, in regional trainings, and at a biennial conference. ProLiteracy advocates for issues related to adult literacy and lifelong learning.

New Readers Press, ProLiteracy’s publishing house, generates $7.5 million in revenue annually through the sale of materials used in adult basic education, high school equivalency test preparation, and English language learning. Proceeds from these sales support the services that ProLiteracy offers to literacy practitioners. News for You, published by New Readers Press, is a weekly online and print news source for English language learners and basic literacy students.

ProLiteracy sustains its operations through revenue generated from fee for services and contributions through donations and grants. A fee for service structure allows ProLiteracy to generate revenue by requesting or requiring payment in exchange for services and products. Contributions include individual donations, bequests, and endowments. Grants are generated through corporate and private foundations.

== Funding ==
About 77 percent of ProLiteracy’s funding comes from sales of its educational materials. About 15 percent comes from private sources, including individuals, corporations, and foundations. The remainder comes from affiliate dues and investment income. In 1997, author Nora Roberts donated damages awarded from a plagiarism lawsuit to the organization.

In 2020, more than 77 percent of donor contributions were allocated to program expenses.

== Accountability standards ==
- Charity Watch graded ProLiteracy with a B+ in 2020 and labeled ProLiteracy as a Top-Rated charity.
- ProLiteracy earned a GuideStar's Platinum Seal of Transparency in 2019 by voluntarily sharing the measures of progress and results they use to pursue their mission.
- Charity Navigator gave ProLiteracy a score of 88.7 out of 100 based on the data from FY2019 as reported on its most recent 990 filed with the IRS.
- A 2017 report by the Better Business Bureau's Wise Giving Alliance (WGA) found that ProLiteracy met all of its standards for charity accountability. The WGA found that ProLiteracy is truthful in its representations of how money is spent, does not allocate an excessive part of its budget for fundraising or administrative expenses, and makes its financial statements readily available to the public.

== Financial crisis and recovery ==
From 2009 to 2013, under then-President and CEO David C. Harvey, ProLiteracy faced severe financial issues, with a $1.8 million shortfall and a $1.7 million loss in net assets in 2012. Moving their headquarters to a revitalized warehouse and investing in the local Syracuse, New York community were contributing factors in the shortfall, including its newly-opened Ruth J. Colvin Center for Innovation and Excellence in Adult Literacy, a public computer lab designed to teach adults computer literacy.

Six months after the move to ProLiteracy's new headquarters, Harvey resigned as President. Current CEO, Kevin J. Morgan, then Chairman of the Board of Directors since 2009, stated that Harvey "went on to pursue other opportunities in the Washington, D.C., area, and let's leave it at that." Morgan later added, "the good news is that David worked for ProLiteracy for five years and did a lot of great things for the organization." Despite this, Harvey's curriculum vitae, published on May 28, 2013, appears to refer to his financial performance at ProLiteracy as having "led a turn-around operation for a $9 million international organization." Harvey has been the Executive Director of the National Coalition of STD Directors since 2016.

Morgan, who received his graduate degree in marketing from Keller Graduate School of Management, was appointed Interim President and CEO, dividing his time between ProLiteracy and Full Suspension Marketing, a small, Utah-based startup and marketing agency he founded in 2007. The ProLiteracy Board of Directors then "formed a search committee for a new president and CEO," said Morgan, concluding that "sometimes it happens quickly, other times it may take some time, depending on who you talk to".

Despite raising over $1 million in charitable donations to refurbish ProLiteracy's new headquarters in the midst of the crisis, it faced a shortfall of $1.2 million in 2013, receiving a 1-star rating on Charity Navigator following nearly a decade of fluctuating between 1- and 3-stars, which had prompted Harvey's 2010 public criticism of the charity watchdog as an "imperfect way to assess".

During the following fiscal year, ProLiteracy downsized considerably, laying off several of its full-time staff and shutting down budding investments into the local Syracuse, New York community. Furthermore, ProLiteracy reduced its international involvement from 30 to 20 countries. In effect, ProLiteracy ended its 2014 fiscal year with $3 million in revenues less expenses and nearly double their net assets, from $3.3 to $6.3 million. The search committee dissolved, as did Morgan's marketing agency, and he remains President and CEO to this day. In 2017, ProLiteracy was awarded its first 4-star rating from Charity Navigator, a composite of a 3-star rating in financial health and 4-star rating in accountability and transparency.

== Awards ==
- In 2019, ProLiteracy was named a Tier 2 Winner for the Barbara Bush Foundation Xprize Award. Presented by the Dollar General Literacy Foundation in the Communities Competition.
- In 2019, Proliteracy Worldwide received the 2019 Library of Congress Literacy Awards David M. Rubenstein Prize (US$150,000).
- In 2018, the Library of Congress named ProLiteracy as an Honoree in the Adult Literacy Program category for the 2018 Literacy Awards.
- In 2016, Syracuse University awarded ProLiteracy Worldwide with the Community Partner Award from the Chancellor’s Award for Public Engagement and Scholarship.
- In 2015, CenterState CEO of Syracuse presented ProLiteracy with the 2015 Community Visionary Award.
