= Bonnie Carroll =

American army widow and activist

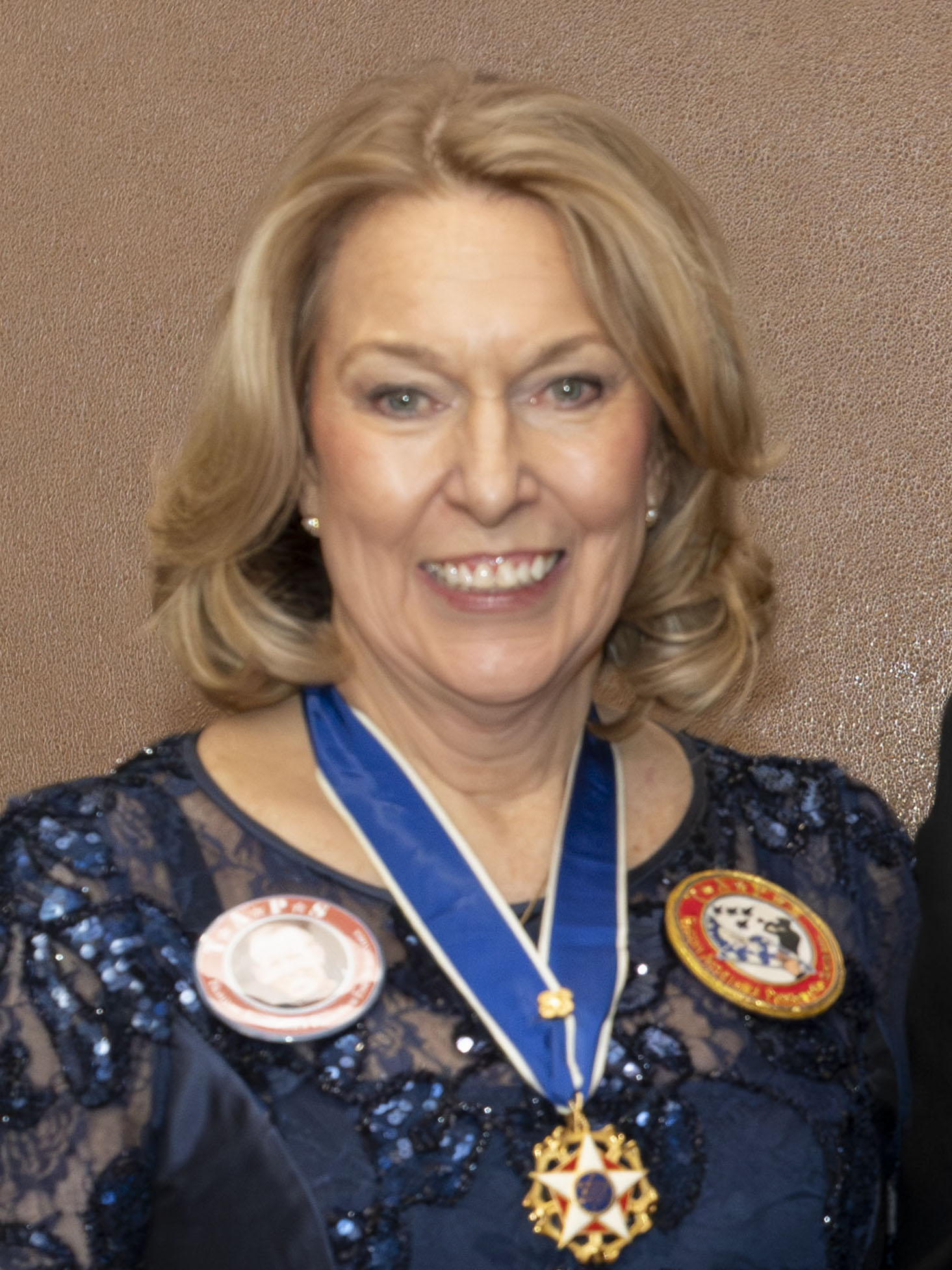
- Education: American University
- Organization: Tragedy Assistance Program for Survivors
- Notable work: Support for those who lose a Military loved one
- Spouse: Brig. Gen. Tom Carroll (died 1992)
- Awards: Presidential Medal of Freedom
- Website: taps.org

Bonnie Carroll is an American widow and the president and founder of the Tragedy Assistance Program for Survivors (TAPS), an organization that provides care, support, and resources to those who have lost a loved one in military service. She is the surviving spouse of Army Brigadier General Tom Carroll, who died in an Army C-12 crash on November 12, 1992. In 2015, she was awarded the Presidential Medal of Freedom.

== Education ==
Carroll earned a bachelor's degree in Public Administration and Political Science from American University in 1988. In 2003, she also received a Diploma in International Relations and Conflict Resolution from the John F. Kennedy School of Government, Harvard University.

== Military and national service ==
Carroll served for 16 years in the Air National Guard as the Transportation Officer, Logistics Officer, and Executive Officer. She also held the position of Chief of Casualty Operations at HQ USAF and worked at the Pentagon with the USAF National Security and Emergency Preparedness staff. Additionally, she was appointed as White House Liaison for the Department of Veterans Affairs (VA).

Carroll served under two POTUS. Under President Ronald Reagan, she worked as a liaison to the Cabinet, coordinating domestic and economic policies. Under President George H. W. Bush, she served in the Counsel's Office, assisting with the legal review of Cabinet-level presidential nominees.

She also served as Deputy Senior Advisor for Programs with Iraq’s Ministry of Communications, where she played a key role in modernizing the postal service and enhancing the country’s media and telecommunications infrastructure.

== Tragedy Assistance Program for Survivors (TAPS) ==
=== Death of husband ===
On November 12, 1992, Brig. Gen. Tom Carroll, 44, then the assistant adjutant general of the Alaska Army National Guard, was making a routine flight to a facility in Juneau from Elmendorf Air Force Base in Anchorage aboard an Army C-12F twin-engine Beechcraft, along with seven others. The guard was preparing for an instrument-aided landing when the plane crashed on the southern Chilkat Peninsula. All eight died shortly after the crash.

Tom Carroll was a member of the national advisory board of the Salvation Army. His father, Thomas P. Carroll, served as Alaska's first National Guard adjutant general, was also killed in a plane crash in 1964.

=== Organization of TAPS ===
In 1994, Carroll founded TAPS, a non-profit organization that provides care, support, and comfort to those who have lost a relative or loved ones in the military. The organization's mission is to offer compassionate care and resources to all those grieving the death of a military loved one through a national peer support network and access to grief resources, at no cost to surviving families and loved ones. Each Memorial Day weekend since 1994, TAPS has hosted the National Military Survivor Seminar and Good Grief Camp in Washington, D.C. They also organize regional seminars for survivors of all ages across the United States. 0

== Awards and recognition ==
In November 2015, Barack Obama awarded Carroll the Presidential Medal of Freedom. In Obama's words, "even by the standards of Medal of Freedom recipients, this is a class act. We are just reminded when we see these individuals here on the stage what an incredible tapestry this country is."

Carroll was also a recipient of the Veterans of Foreign Wars' James E. Van Zandt Citizenship Award (2017) and the Robert M. Yerkes Award (2017), presented by the American Psychological Association. In 2019, she received the Angel of Honor Award from the Armed Service YMCA.

== Publications ==
- Healing Your Grieving Heart After a Military Death: 100 Practical Ideas for Family and Friends (co-authored with Alan D. Wolfelt, PhD.), Companion Press (2015)
