= Tragedy Assistance Program for Survivors =

American nonprofit organization

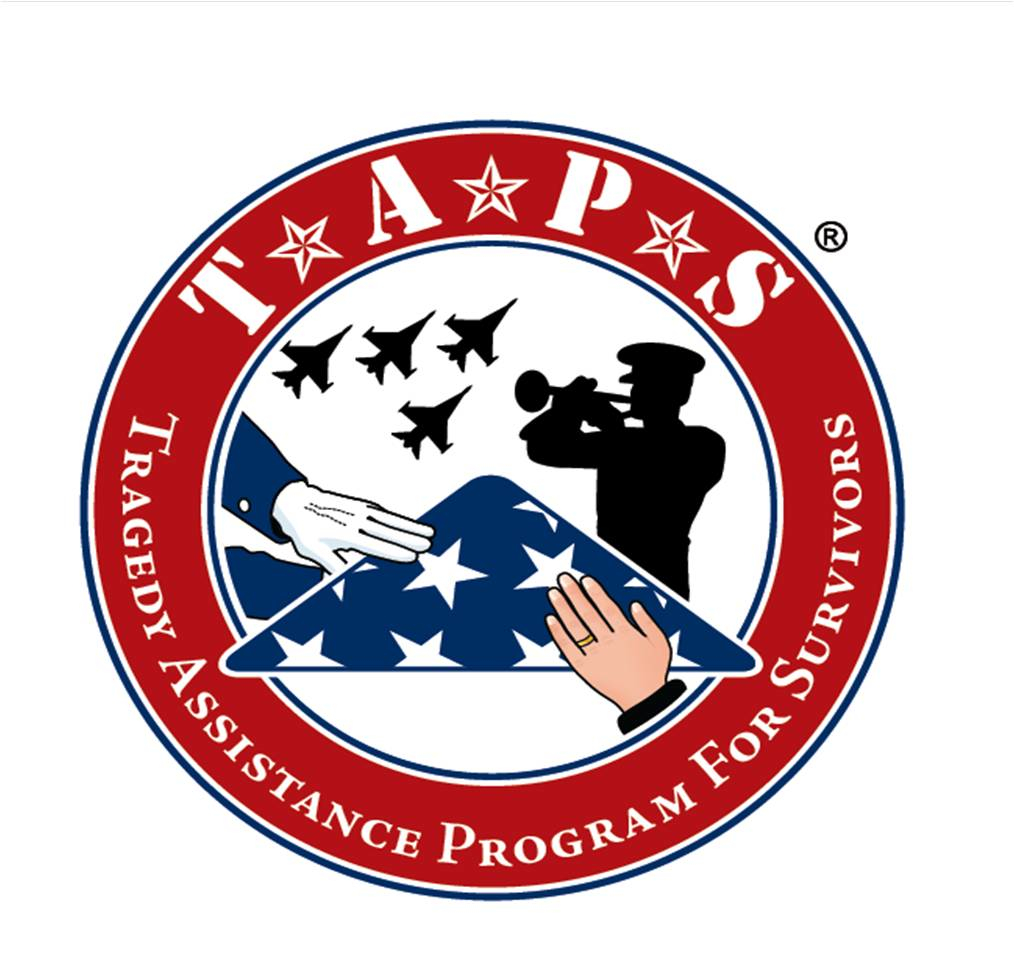
- Type: Nonprofit
- Founded: 1994; 32 years ago
- Founders: Bonnie Carroll
- Headquarters: Arlington, Virginia, U.S.
- Revenue: 11,690,840 United States dollar (2016)
- Total assets: 10,721,930 United States dollar (2022)
- Website: www.taps.org

Tragedy Assistance Program for Survivors (TAPS) is an American nonprofit organization that provides care and support to families and friends of members of the U.S. armed forces who died while serving. TAPS was founded in 1994 by Bonnie Carroll. The mission of TAPS is to provide ongoing emotional help, hope, and healing to all who are grieving the death of a loved one in military service to America. TAPS is committed to providing compassionate care to all military survivors regardless of their relationship to the deceased or the circumstances or geography of the death. This is done through long-term, peer-based emotional support, crisis response and intervention, casualty casework assistance, and grief and trauma resources and information.

== History ==
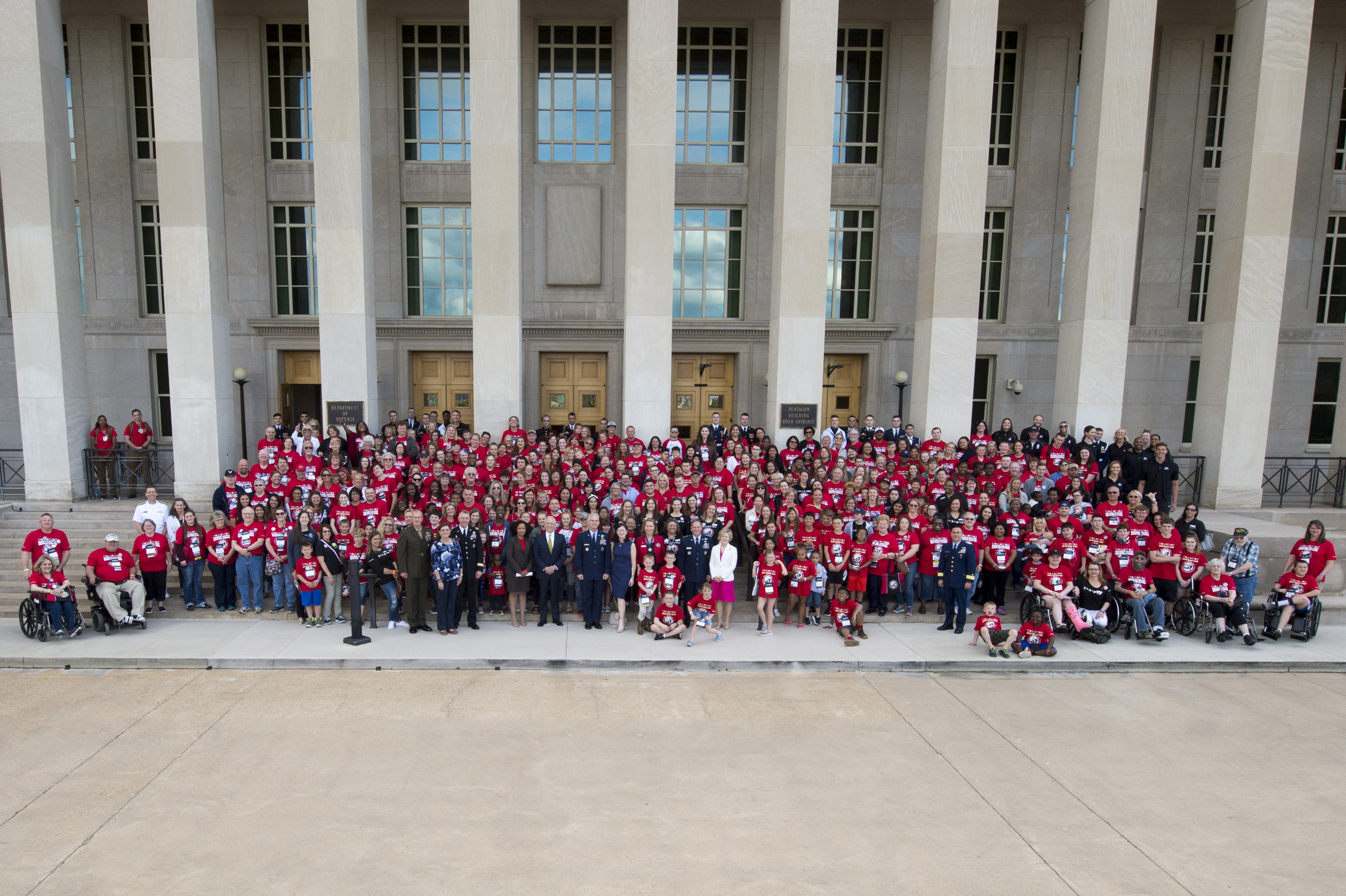
Secretary of Defense James Mattis with members of TAPS in 2017

TAPS was founded in the wake of a military tragedy, after eight soldiers were killed in a C-12 plane crash in Alaska in November 1992. Among the grieving family members was Bonnie Carroll, the military widow of Army Brigadier General Tom Carroll. At the time there was no national emotional support network for the families of America's fallen heroes. The families therefore found support amongst each other then, often right at the comfort of their own kitchen tables.

After conducting two years of research examining the resources available to support bereaved military families and benchmarking best practices at other peer-based support organizations, Carroll founded TAPS in 1994 and still serves as its president and on its board of directors.

By September 2001, the Tragedy Assistance Program for Survivors (TAPS) had established grief and peer support programs recognized by military leadership. Following the 9/11 attacks, as the United States entered prolonged military conflict, TAPS integrated into the Pentagon Family Assistance Center to offer peer-based emotional support to affected military families.

The impacts of two decades of persistent security threats and conflict have meant a stark increase in training, combat, suicide, and illness deaths across the military services and in our veteran population. In recognition of both TAPS continued commitment to provide quality compassionate care for the growing group of bereaved military family members in this post 9/11 era and Carroll's decades of selfless work on behalf of all families of the fallen, President Barack Obama awarded the Presidential Medal of Freedom to TAPS President and Founder, Bonnie Carroll in 2015. Carroll accepted this award on behalf of the entire TAPS Family.

== Mission ==
TAPS mission is caring for the families of America's fallen heroes. They do so by providing comfort, care and resources to all those grieving the death of a military loved one. Since 1994, TAPS has provided at no cost, a support network and connection to grief resources to surviving families and loved ones.

On average, TAPS reaches new survivors within days of a casualty notification.

TAPS was designed to complement services offered by other organizations, the military, or the government. They operate under Memorandums of Understanding (MOU) with the military service components, the Department of Veterans Affairs, and contractor assets with the Department of State to ensure the continuity of care for families following casualty assistance. TAPS collaborates with both the Executive and Legislative Branches of government to advocate for care and benefits for survivors of military loss.

== Survivors Helping Survivors Heal ==
Caring for families of America's fallen heroes often begins with a phone call. The TAPS National Military Survivor Helpline is a toll free 24/7/365 resource and information line at 1-800-959-TAPS (8277) through which TAPS begins to connect families with the care and benefits assistance they need. All calls are answered by a TAPS professional and not an automated system.

TAPS was founded on the principles of best practices in peer-based emotional support for bereaved survivors. Even staff members are primarily survivors of military loss who received support from TAPS after their own loss and who have now made it their profession to pay it forward.

Today, TAPS provides care to grieving military family members using these best practices. Researcher Dr. Paul Bartone has documented the impact of this work in a landmark systematic review of evidence and best practices in peer-based support. This report, "Peer Support for Bereaved Survivors: Systematic Review of Evidence and Identification of Best Practices" highlights eight ground rules for successful programs that can be benchmarked by all those working in peer-based programs.

Peer support gives those who have had a unique experience or who are facing a personal challenge the framework to connect with another with that shared experience or challenge, either individually or in a group setting.

Being heard, understood, and having a sense of community is at the heart of TAPS and is the mission focus of the TAPS Peer Mentor Program. TAPS Peer Mentors are survivors ready to be a companion in another's grief journey. They are typically at least 18 months beyond their own loss and have reached a place where they feel ready to give of their time and their heart to be a supportive presence to a new survivor. Peer Mentors receive training and become a vital part of outreach, including opportunities for leadership and facilitator roles.

One-to-one pairings of two adult military survivors offer a companion to new survivors as they face their unexpected path. In addition survivors are supported by their peers within TAPS Care Groups, TAPS Togethers, Seminars, and other special programming like expeditions and empowerment retreats.

Each year, TAPS holds several programs which welcome and support thousands of participants across the nation and overseas. The National Military Survivor Seminar and Good Grief Camp has been held annually in Washington, D.C., over Memorial Day weekend since 1994. TAPS also conducts regional survivor seminars for adults and youth programs at locations across the country, as well as expeditions and empowerment programming. Unique to TAPS Good Grief Camp and TAPS youth programs are the Military Mentors and Legacy Mentors who volunteer to provide one-on-one mentoring for the bereaved military children and teens attending TAPS events. A military mentor is someone currently serving in the military or a veteran of the armed forces who serves as a caring companion and a reminder to TAPS kids that the military never forgets them or their fallen heroes. A legacy mentor is themself a military survivor who has already graduated from Good Grief Camp and is ready to support younger survivors grieving the loss of their military loved one.

TAPS offers online resources that allow survivors to connect through peer-hosted chats, message boards, and group discussions between in-person events. In response to the COVID-19 pandemic, it expanded its online services to support continued connection and access to care.

Through its network of partners and resources, TAPS assists people through grief and loss, along with training and education for bereavement professionals. In March 2018, it launched the TAPS Institute for Hope and Healing through a partnership with the Hospice Foundation of America. The Institute seeks to be a resource and training center while also serving as a hub for collaboration among professionals working in the bereavement community.

== Suicide Loss Support and TAPS Suicide Postvention Model (TM) ==
In 2008, TAPS began building a new program specifically designed for military families bereaved by suicide deaths. Under the leadership of Kim Ruocco as Vice President of TAPS Suicide Prevention & Postvention, thousands of military family members, loved ones, and friends have received services and support for their grief related to losing a service member or veteran who has died by suicide.

TAPS offers specialized care and resources developed in part by suicide loss survivors themselves, which address the complicated grief of this population and the factors that often hinder the healing process. Rooted in peer-based support, TAPS is able to provide vital encouragement to survivors so they know they do not have to face their grief alone—the process of postvention.

Postvention is an intervention strategy of support for survivors in the aftermath of a death by suicide, which reduces the likelihood that survivors will suffer from "complicated grief," and, ultimately, gives them a pathway to healthy grieving. Postvention is an effective tool in suicide prevention that allows survivors to share their "lessons learned on the lookback" to improve best practices in mental health and reduce stigma, thereby saving lives.

TAPS uses a three-phase postvention approach called the TAPS Suicide Postvention Model, which includes Stabilization, Grief Work, and Posttraumatic Growth. Stabilization focuses on identifying and addressing suicide-specific issues that may complicate the grief journey. Grief work is the process of moving away from how a loved one dies and rebuilding a relationship that focuses on how they lived and served. Posttraumatic growth is the process of finding meaning from the loss.

One such program, the National Military Suicide Survivor Seminar and Good Grief Camp, which began in 2009. This annual event has given thousands of survivors of suicide loss the coping skills and encouragement needed to begin a path toward healing for themselves as well as their families.

The TAPS Suicide Prevention & Postvention program was created in 2017 to bring the TAPS Suicide Postvention Model to other outside organizations and providers around the world. The program's team has become a major contributing voice in the national conversation on suicide awareness, prevention, and the field of suicidology. The team continues to contribute in the areas of public messaging, specialty training, and webinars as consultants across the military, public, and private sectors.

Their work now includes partnerships with both national and international organizations, board representation on task forces, specialty committees, and other advocacy platforms (for example with the American Association of Suicidology, the American Foundation for Suicide Prevention, and the National Action Alliance for Suicide Prevention) and thought leadership among national policy discussion and legislation related to military suicide (such as with the Defense Suicide Prevention Office and the Department of Veterans Affairs).

TAPS is America's leading organization in military suicide postvention, setting the standard in best practices and quality of care for those impacted by military suicide loss. In 2020, the team was selected to be a key member of the President's Roadmap to Empower Veterans and End a National Tragedy of Suicide (PREVENTS). Enacted by Executive Order, PREVENTS is a Cabinet-level, interagency effort to develop the first federally coordinated national public health strategy to address suicide.

The PREVENTS Roadmap, released in June 2020, is a historic, national plan to raise awareness about mental health, connect veterans and others at risk of suicide to federal and local resources, and facilitate focused and coordinated research into suicide.

In January 2021 TAPS published a peer-reviewed article in the field-leading scholarly journal Death Studies entitled "TAPS Suicide Postvention Model: A Comprehensive Framework of Healing and Growth" about TAPS’ three-phase approach to care that is beneficial to both survivors and providers in the aftermath of a death by suicide. This document is the culmination of a more than decade of care to thousands of survivors of military and veteran suicide loss.

== Government relations, policy, and advocacy ==
TAPS support for survivors extends beyond grief work to advocacy and assistance with casework and benefits.

TAPS supports and advances policy and legislation to strengthen the families of America's fallen military heroes. TAPS Policy team listens to the concerns of surviving military families and advocates on their behalf. They work to educate military and veterans organizations, Members of Congress, and policymakers within the Department of Veterans Affairs, the Department of Defense, and other government agencies to ensure surviving families receive the care and benefits their loved ones have earned through their service and sacrifice.

TAPS is focused on four major policy and legislative priorities:

- Protect and Strengthen Earned Survivor Benefits
- Advance Collaborative Suicide Prevention & Postvention Strategies and Policies
- Create Toxic Exposure Awareness and Fight for Fundamental Reforms
- Strengthen Quality Education and Student Protections for Surviving Families

=== Survivor advocates ===
TAPS venture into policy work has encouraged the involvement of many surviving family members interested in taking part in advocacy initiatives to help affect change on behalf of other families of the fallen. Their willingness to reach out to lawmakers and share their own experiences has been influential in helping TAPS Policy team succeed with legislative initiatives benefiting military veterans and surviving families including:

- Post 9/11 GI Bill with several provisions for surviving family members
- Passing Veteran Suicide Prevention legislation
- Protecting Death Gratuities for the families of fallen active duty service members
- Elimination of the "Widow's Tax" and Repeal of the "Kiddie Tax"
- The "Cheryl Lankford Memorial Act to Improve Assistance for Gold Star Spouses and Other Dependents" to keep bereaved military families from slipping through the cracks and ensure that dependent children can access the benefits they are entitled to receive.
- Toxic Exposure in the American Military, or TEAM Act
- COVID-19 Benefits for Active Duty Servicemembers, the Reserve Components, and their Survivors Act of 2020
- Ensuring Survivors Benefits during COVID-19 Act of 2020
- Johnny Isakson and David P. Roe, M.D. Veterans Health Care and Benefits Improvement Act of 2020 (H.R.7105)
- Fiscal Year 2021 National Defense Authorization Act (NDAA)
- COVID Economic Relief Package

=== Toxic exposure and military caregivers ===
An emerging field in TAPS survivor advocacy is toxic exposure. Death by illness is one of the leading causes of death among military survivors. As more of these survivors reached out to TAPS for support, a common peer experience began to emerge in their stories - that of being former caregivers to veterans diagnosed with often aggressive and rare medical conditions after returning from their military deployments. While recognizing common illness loss, the growing numbers and similarities were enough to have survivors concerned that like the Vietnam era, post 9/11 veterans were also exposed to toxins known to cause terminal illnesses. TAPS works to document their stories and aggregate data to better understand the scope and types of illness. TAPS is also a leading advocate for the families, caregivers, and survivors of veterans exposed to toxins. TAPS is working with over 30 partner organizations to raise awareness about the impacts of toxic exposures on our service members and veterans, the need for comprehensive healthcare and benefit reforms, the importance of support for their caregivers and survivors, and the need to expand research and outreach.

This advocacy became the natural springboard for TAPS newest program, Caregiver to Survivor, launched April 2021 in partnership with the Elizabeth Dole Foundation and American Red Cross Military and Veteran Caregiver Network. The collaboration creates a connection for military caregivers as they deal with the impacts of isolation and complicated grief surrounding their loved one's illness and anticipated death.

== Casework and benefits ==
TAPS supports survivors through immediate and long term professional, financial, and personal decisions. TAPS Casework helps survivors with sudden employment decisions, financial planning choices, burial and benefit questions, and paperwork.

TAPS Casework maintains close relationships with government agencies and service branches to help resolve issues, such as burials, benefits, records and more. They are able to address individual needs by aligning available resources from long time partners of TAPS mission and an extensive network of third-party organizations with expertise in areas such as healthcare, financial hardships, credit counseling and civil legal issues.

These partnerships help with military benefits and entitlements and have enabled TAPS to assist military survivors impacted by natural and manmade disasters including the coronavirus pandemic.

=== Education assistance ===
One of the more robust survivor benefit services TAPS provides is assistance with education resources. TAPS Education Support Services provides scholarship information and benefits resources for military survivors. This includes a specially created searchable database of available scholarships for military survivors applying for both higher education as well as some available resources that help with costs associated with private grammar school tuition. TAPS education support coordinators assist families by explaining benefits, helping them align available financial resources with education goals, and guiding them through the application process.

In recent years, TAPS has hosted a College Experience weekend for rising high school sophomores and juniors along with their guardians to meet with experts in the areas of higher education. They learn more about the application process, explore a range of opportunities available in college curriculum and extracurricular activities, and even spend time on professional development as they look to enter the workforce.

TAPS Education Support Services continues to support students as they begin their freshman year of college with an Education Care Package designed with surviving military children and siblings in mind.

== Support for TAPS ==
As a 501(c)(3) charity, TAPS relies solely on supporters to fund and assist the programs that make the biggest difference for military families. They are a four-star rated charity on Charity Navigator, America's largest independent charity evaluator, having exceeded industry standards for financial accountability, transparency, and out performing most charities. In addition they have achieved platinum recognition by GuideStar, the highest level of recognition among charities. Points of Light certified TAPS as a Service Enterprise, recognizing it effectively delivers on its mission by strategically engaging volunteer time and talent. TAPS received the Best in America Seal of Excellence Charity by America's Best Charities. They are a part of the Four Star Alliance with America's Warrior Partnership and a member of the National Association of Veteran-Serving Organizations. TAPS is also listed as a 2020 Top-Rated NonProfit by Great NonProfits and is considered a Top-Rated Charity by Charity Watch.

Opportunities to get involved with TAPS include traditional donations, fundraising, volunteering, estate-giving, and business and event sponsorships. Some of TAPS largest fundraisers come through hosted events like golf tournaments and the Colorado Celebrity Classic, racing in honor of fallen heroes with Team TAPS, Facebook Fundraisers, and the annual TAPS Honor Guard Gala. TAPS also receives monies earned by supporters through retail partners and shop for a cause platforms including eBay and iGive. More recently, TAPS partnered to initiate a vehicle donation pilot program with Capital Auto LLC.

In 2019, TAPS teamed up with long time supporters, Roots and American Music Society, Jimmy Nichols, and Frank Myers, to launch its first fundraising album, Love Lives On. Surviving family members teamed with country songwriters—Brett Jones, Billy Montana, Richie McDonald, and Deborah Allen—and artists including Lonestar, Vince Gill, All-4-One, Pam Tillis, and Billy Ray Cyrus to create lyrics and melodies that honored their fallen heroes. The album was officially released over Memorial Day weekend in May 2020.

TAPS largest group of sponsors and partners are those who have committed significant financial contributions each year to support the mission. National partners include Boeing, The Hartwell Foundation, Prudential, and USAA.

In 2013, TAPS established programs for families of the fallen to honor their heroes through special sports (teams4taps) and entertainment (Stars4taps) partnerships. The TAPS Sports & Entertainment department has grown from its initial partnership with the Washington Capitals Courage Caps program to partnerships with hundreds of teams, athletes, celebrities, and members of the entertainment industry across the country. These partnerships span college, professional and Olympic teams in sports and with film, television, theater and music through entertainment. TAPS Sports & Entertainment events have often served as a platform for mental wellness for surviving families. In addition, partnerships have expanded to England where TAPS has built programming to support British survivors using sports as the foundation for bringing families from both the United States and the United Kingdom together.
