= Earl Charles Behrens =

American journalist

Earl C. Behrens
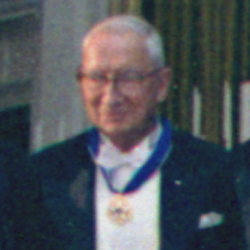
- Behrens receiving the Presidential Medal of Freedom in 1970.
- Born: Earl Charles Behrens; February 7, 1892; Shasta, California
- Died: May 13, 1985 (age 93); Menlo Park, California
- Occupations: Political journalist, editor

Earl Charles Behrens (February 7, 1892 — May 13, 1985) was a political editor for the San Francisco Chronicle from the 1920s to 1970s. Behrens started his career with the Chronicle in 1923 after working at the San Francisco Journal from 1921 to 1923 as an editor. With the Chronicle, Behrens wrote about political conventions held in the United States from 1924 to 1972 and retired from journalism in 1974. During his career, Behrens was awarded the Presidential Medal of Freedom in 1970.

== Early life and education ==
Behrens was born in Shasta, California. For his post-secondary education, Behrens graduated from Stanford University with a bachelor's degree in 1914. While attending the University of California, Berkeley for his postgraduate studies, Behrens left the university in 1917 during World War I. As a member of the American Expeditionary Forces, he traveled throughout Siberia and was injured by a land mine.

== Career ==
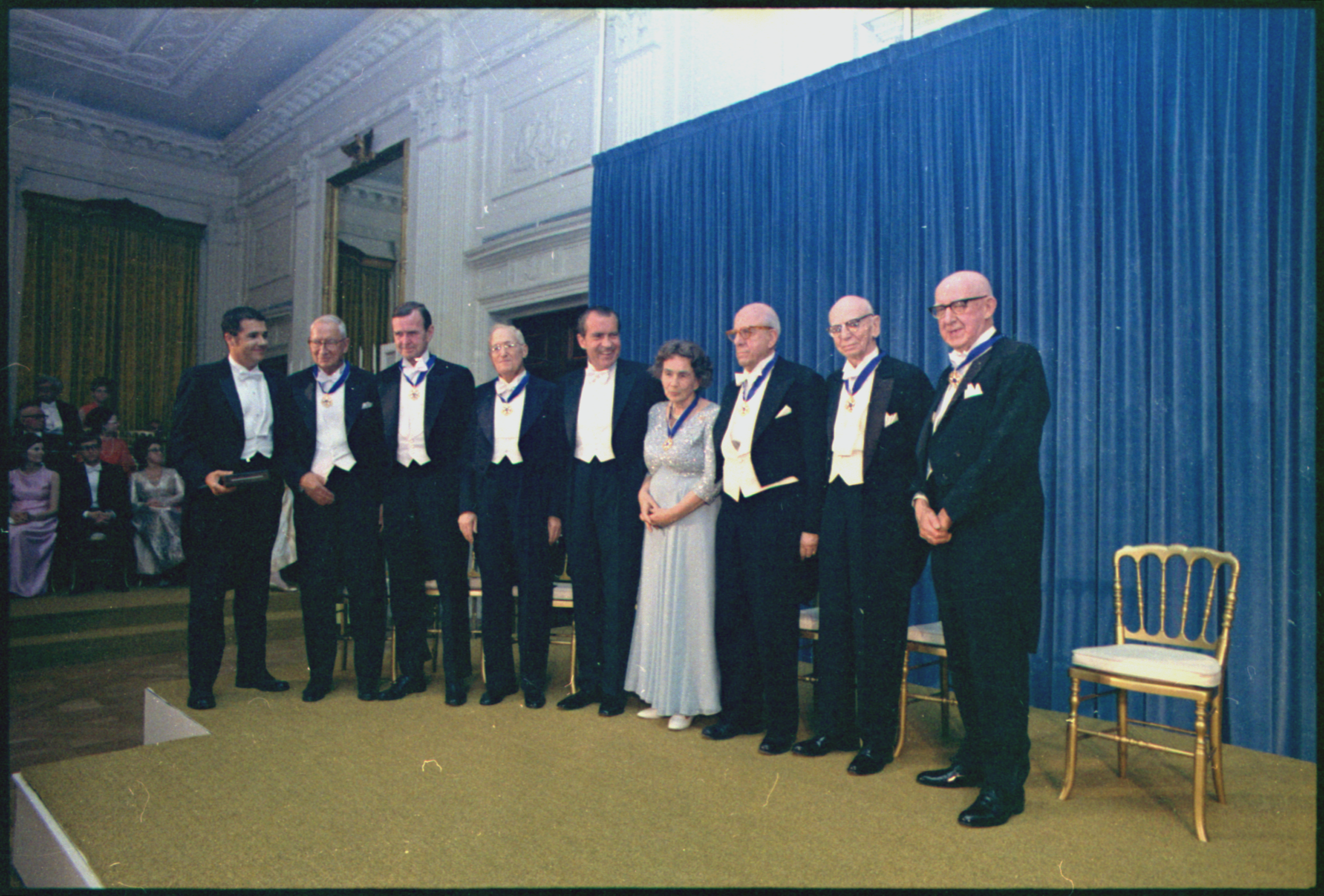
Behrens, second from the furthest left in this image (physically, not politically) accepts the Presidential Medal of Freedom from President Richard Nixon on April 22, 1970.

Behrens started his journalism career as an editor and correspondent for multiple Stanford student newspapers. After returning from the war in 1920, Behrens became an editor for the San Francisco Journal in 1921. In 1923, Behrens left the Journal for the San Francisco Chronicle and became the newspaper's political editor. During his tenure, Behrens wrote about political conventions held throughout the United States from 1924 to 1972. A few years later, Behrens ended his career when he retired from the Chronicle in 1974.

== Awards and honors ==
Behrens received the Presidential Medal of Freedom in 1970. The accompanying citation described him, in part, as "a legend among political reporters not only for his great skill but also for fairness, unfailing good humor, and consistent good sense."

== Personal life ==
On December 6, 1937, Behrens married Rae Griswold Cunningham in Las Vegas. Behrens died on May 13, 1985, in Menlo Park, California, at the age of 93. He had one child.
