= Morris I. Leibman =

American lawyer

- Died: April 21, 1992; Chicago, Illinois, U.S.
- Education: University of Chicago Law School
- Occupation: Attorney
- Spouse: Mary Leibman
- Children: 2 sons

Morris I. Leibman (died April 21, 1992) was an American attorney. He was a partner at Sidley Austin and the founder of United States Institute of Peace and a Chicago-based think tank called the National Strategy Forum. Leibman served on the Board of Trustees of Loyola University Chicago from 1971 to 1981; he was the board's first Jewish member and served mainly with Jesuits earning him the nickname "the Jewish Jesuit." He graduated from the University of Chicago Law School in 1933. He served as a civilian aide-at-large to the United States Secretary of the Army from 1964 to 1979, and he was awarded the Presidential Medal of Freedom by President Ronald Reagan in 1981.
