= White House Office of the Executive Clerk =

Staffer in charge of maintaining the US president's legal correspondence

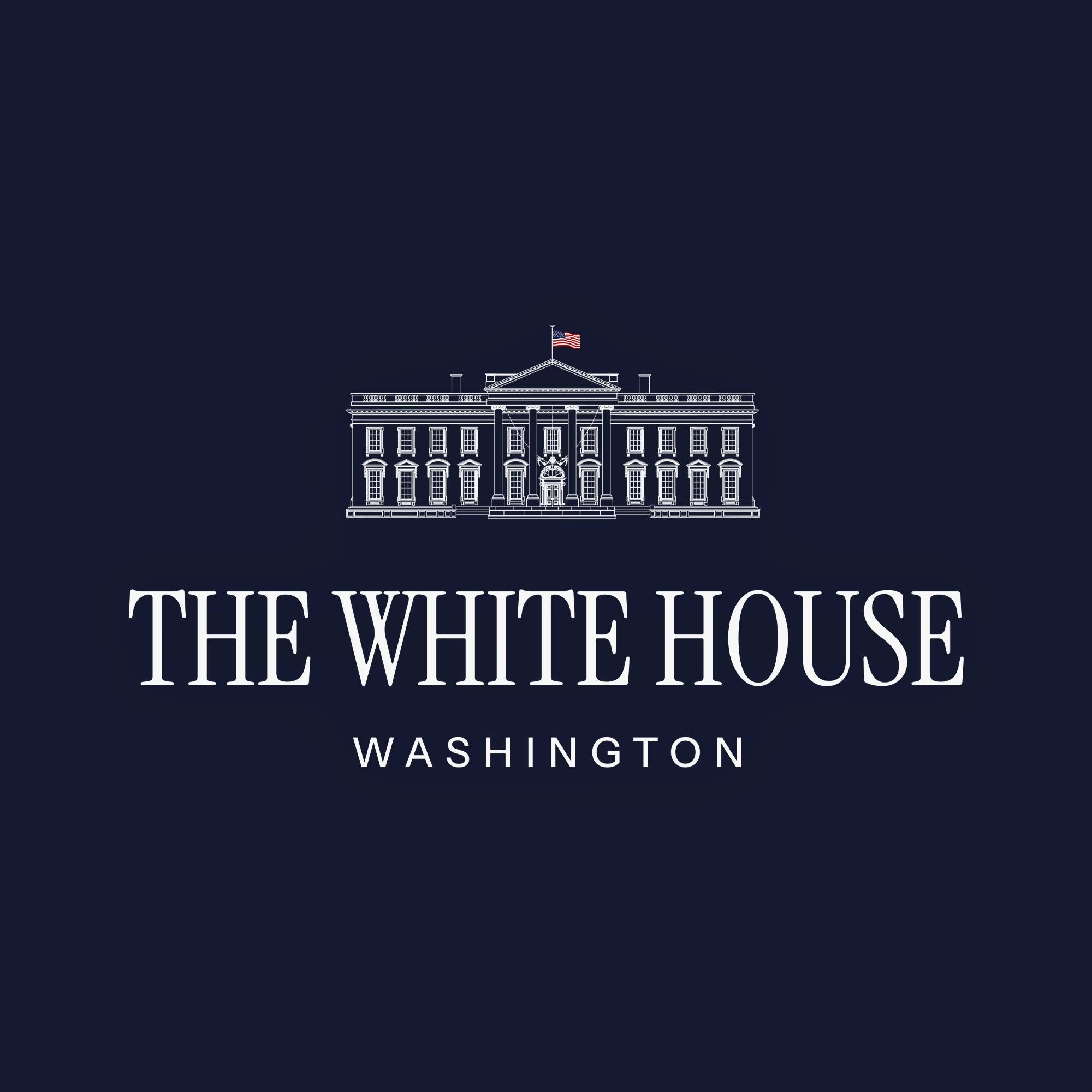

Agency overview
- Formed: 1865; 161 years ago
- Headquarters: Eisenhower Executive Office Building; Washington, D.C., U.S. 38°53′51.24″N 77°2′20.93″W
- Agency executive: David E. Kalbaugh, Executive Clerk
- Parent department: Office of the Staff Secretary

The White House Office of the Executive Clerk is responsible for managing the original legal documents signed by the president of the United States which make up his official acts—these include public laws, vetoes, treaties, executive orders, signing statements, nominations, proclamations, commissions, pardons, and certificates of awards or medals. The office is further responsible for delivering any reports or messages the president wishes to send to the United States Congress. Formed in 1865, it is one of the oldest offices in the Executive Office of the President of the United States.

== Organization ==
The Office of the Executive Clerk is currently housed within the larger White House Office of the Staff Secretary, which controls the general paper flow through the president's office. The Office of the Executive Clerk is a small component, typically composed of just the executive clerk and three to five assistants working out of Room 2 in the northwest corner of the ground floor of the Eisenhower Executive Office Building—across from the West Wing.

Unlike most components of the White House Office—where the staff are nearly all political appointees of the incumbent president—the Office of the Executive Clerk is staffed entirely by career civil servants. Also unique within the White House, the executive clerk retains many of its records from one administration to the next, rather than packing up all documents and data and delivering them to the National Archives and Records Administration as other White House offices are required to do under the Presidential Records Act. Since the founding of the office in 1865, there have been only 11 executive clerks—an average term of over 13 years per executive clerk. The current White House executive clerk, since 2012, is career civil servant Dave Kalbaugh. Kalbaugh has served in the Office of the Executive Clerk for 29 years, serving four presidents.

== History ==
Before the establishment of the White House staff secretary in 1953, the executive clerk oversaw a much broader range of White House functions, including White House finances, the messenger service, the mail room, presidential correspondence, and records management.

== Key Staff ==
- Executive Clerk: David E. Kalbaugh
  - Deputy Executive Clerk: Brian Pate

== Executive clerks ==
Partial table of former White House executive clerks:

Image	Officeholder	Term start	Term end
	William H. Crook	1870	1910
	Rudolph Forster	1910	1943
	Maurice C. Latta	1943	1948
	William J. Hopkins	1948	1971
	Noble C. Melencamp	1971	1973
	Robert D. Linder	1973	1982
	Ronald G. Geisler	1982	1994
	G. Timothy Saunders	1994	2012
	David E. Kalbaugh	2012	present
