= William J. Hopkins (civil servant) =

American civil servant

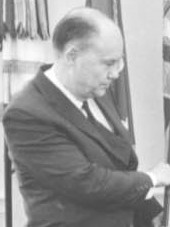
- Hopkins in 1970

White House Executive Clerk
- In office April 1948 – May 28, 1971
- President: Harry S. Truman; Dwight D. Eisenhower; John F. Kennedy; Lyndon B. Johnson; Richard Nixon
- Preceded by: Maurice C. Latta
- Succeeded by: Noble M. Melencamp

Personal details
- Born: 1910; Netawaka, Kansas, U.S.
- Died: July 29, 2004 (aged 93–94); Gainesville, Florida, U.S.
- Spouse: Marie Hopkins (m. 1934; died 2003)
- Children: 3
- Awards: Presidential Medal of Freedom (1971); President's Award for Distinguished Federal Civilian Service (1960)

William J. Hopkins (1910 – July 29, 2004) was an American civil servant. He served as the Executive Clerk of the White House from 1948 to 1971. In total, he served 40 years at the White House working for seven presidents.

== Early life and education ==
Hopkins was born in Netawaka, Kansas, in 1910. His father was a carpenter and built the family home in Netawaka. He graduated from Netawaka High School in 1927 and attended the Chillicothe Business College, in Chillicothe, Missouri. He remained there only one year but took the civil service exam while there. He took a job for the Burlington Railroad in Centerville, Iowa, and worked there until he received an offer to work for the federal government.

== Career ==
In May 1929, he moved to Washington, D.C., and began work as a junior clerk and stenographer for the Naturalization Service of the United States Department of Labor. In October 1931, during the presidency of Herbert Hoover, he was detailed to the White House Office of Presidential Correspondence. At that time, the White House Office had roughly 45 full-time employees and about the same number of detailees from various agencies, all working in the West Wing of the White House.

Hopkins remained a detailee at the White House until 1943, when Senior Executive Clerk Rudolph Forster died. Forster was succeeded by the junior executive clerk, Maurice Latta, and Hopkins was hired as the new junior executive clerk. When Latta died, in April 1948, Hopkins was promoted to succeed him as chief Executive Clerk.

In 1960, President Dwight D. Eisenhower honored Hopkins for his decades of public service by awarding him the President's Award for Distinguished Federal Civilian Service. In a 1966 ceremony, President Lyndon B. Johnson promoted Hopkins and granted him the new title Executive Assistant to the President, although his responsibilities were largely unchanged.

Hopkins retired on May 28, 1971. On June 2, 1971, President Richard Nixon held a formal retirement celebration for him in a White House Rose Garden ceremony. During his remarks, President Nixon surprised Hopkins by awarding him the Presidential Medal of Freedom—the nation's highest civilian honor. Typically, the citation which accompanies a Presidential Medal of Freedom is read by an aide while the President presents the award, but in this instance, President Nixon took the unusual step of reading the citation himself. The citation reads:

During his forty years in the White House, under seven Presidents, William J. Hopkins has written a record of skilled and devoted service unique in the annals of the Presidency. Not only has he borne heavy responsibilities with great efficiency and uncommon good sense, but each new President in turn has learned to rely on him as a fount of wisdom, a reservoir of experience and a rock of loyalty. Guiding each new administration through its initial steps, standing as a staunch friend to all, he has been, in the best sense, a selfless partisan of the Presidency, and of the Nation that these seven Presidents have been able to serve better because of the help that he gave.

== Personal life ==
Hopkins was married to his wife, Marie, for 69 years, from 1934 until her death in October 2003. He died the following summer, on July 29, 2004, aged 93 or 94, at E.T. York Hospice Care Center, in Gainesville, Florida. The Hopkins lived most of their life in Silver Spring, Maryland, but relocated to Florida in 1994. They had one son and two daughters, and, at the time of his death, 12 grandchildren and 18 great-grandchildren.
