= List of public art in Merthyr Tydfil County Borough =

Map of Wales with Merthyr Tydfil County Borough highlighted

This is a list of public art in Merthyr Tydfil County Borough in south Wales. This list applies only to works of public art on permanent display in an outdoor public space and does not, for example, include artworks in museums.

== Bedlinog ==
Image	Title / subject	Location and coordinates	Date	Artist / designer	Type	Material	Dimensions	Designation	Wikidata	Notes
	War memorial	High Street, Bedlinog	1925		Cross	Stone				

== Cefn-coed-y-cymmer ==
Image	Title / subject	Location and coordinates	Date	Artist / designer	Type	Material	Dimensions	Designation	Wikidata	Notes
	War memorial	High Street, Cefn-coed-y-cymmer	1924		Cross within gable surround	Bath stone	4m tall	Grade II	Q29504401	

== Dowlais ==
Image	Title / subject	Location and coordinates	Date	Artist / designer	Type	Material	Dimensions	Designation	Wikidata	Notes
More images	Dowlais Ironworks memorial	Dowlais	1987		Ingot mould	Cast iron				

== Merthyr Tydfil ==
Image	Title / subject	Location and coordinates	Date	Artist / designer	Type	Material	Dimensions	Designation	Wikidata	Notes
More images	William Lewis, 1st Baron Merthyr	Upper Thomas Street, Merthyr Tydfil	1898	Thomas Brock	Statue on pedestal	Bronze and granite		Grade II	Q29489929	
More images	South African war memorial	Queens Road, Merthyr Tydfil	1904	Washington Morgan	Obelisk	Granite	7m tall	Grade II	Q29489922	
More images	War memorial	Pontmorlais Circus, Merthyr Tydfil	1931	Leonard Stanford Merrifield	Statue group and surround	Bronze and Portland stone		Grade II	Q29489908	
More images	Seymour Berry, 1st Baron Buckland	Outside Carnegie Library, Merthyr Tydfil	1931	Goscombe John	Statue on pedestal	Bronze and stone		Grade II	Q29489898	
More images	Monument to Richard Trevithick	Pendarren Road, Merthyr Tydfil	1933	I.S. Williams of Cardiff	Replica steam engine on plinth	Metal and stone				
More images	War memorial	Castle Street, Merthyr Tydfil	1990		Celtic Cross	Stone				
More images	Eddie Thomas	Bethesda Gardens, Merthyr Tydfil		Peter Nicholas	Statue on pedestal	Bronze and stone				
More images	Howard Winstone	St Tydfil's Square, Merthyr Tydfil	2001	David Petersen	Statue	Bronze	2.2m tall			
More images	Johnny Owen	St Tydfil's Shopping Centre, Merthyr Tydfil	2002	James Done	Statue on plinth	Bronze				

== Trelewis ==
Image	Title / subject	Location and coordinates	Date	Artist / designer	Type	Material	Dimensions	Designation	Wikidata	Notes
	War memorial	Trelewis	1925	David Williams (sculptor), Daniel Williams of Abercynon (builder)	Statue on pedestal	Stone				Relocated & rededicated in 2002.

== Troed-y-rhiw ==
Image	Title / subject	Location and coordinates	Date	Artist / designer	Type	Material	Dimensions	Designation	Wikidata	Notes
	War memorial	Troed-y-rhiw	c.1920	C. Pryce (sculptor)	Statue on pedestal	Marble and granite		Grade II		
