= David William Reeve =

American photographer and author

- Born: 1971 (age 54–55); United States
- Education: Chapman University (BFA, Communications)
- Occupations: Photographer; author
- Known for: Gladiator School
- Website: gladiatorschool.org

David William Reeve (born 1971) is an American photographer and author. He is best known for Gladiator School: Stories from Inside YTS, a series of photo essays and oral histories documenting life in California’s most notorious juvenile facility—the Youth Training School (later the Heman G. Stark Youth Correctional Facility) in Chino, California also known among wards as “Gladiator School.”

== Early life and education ==
Reeve, born in 1971, grew up in California. He studied communications at Chapman University, where he earned a Bachelor of Fine Arts degree.

== Gladiator School ==
Gladiator School: Stories from Inside YTS is a long-form photography and oral-history project created by Reeve. The series documents life inside the Youth Training School, a California Youth Authority facility in Chino, California known for its violence, mayhem, and institutional dysfunction through images and first-person interviews. The project includes episodes like *"The boxing trophy"* (August 2024), capturing personal artifacts and stories, and *"Tattooed Tears"* (March 2025), which revisits documentary filmmakers who witnessed YTS in 1978.

Reeve also makes the series available as photo essay, and covers events such as a reunion picnic in Yucaipa where former inmates shared their experiences Medium. He has published more than twenty episodes of the *Gladiator School* project in essay form on Medium that combine photography, oral history, and narrative text.

A live exhibition of Gladiator School debuted at the University of Redlands in October 2023, displaying 21 photographs in the School of Education in addition to a lecture and panel discussion. The series was featured by the Los Angeles Times,The San Bernardino Sun, Juvenile Justice Information Exchange and Witness LA.

== Personal life ==
Reeve lives in Brea, California, with his family.
