= Sugar Ramos =

Cuban boxer (1941–2017)

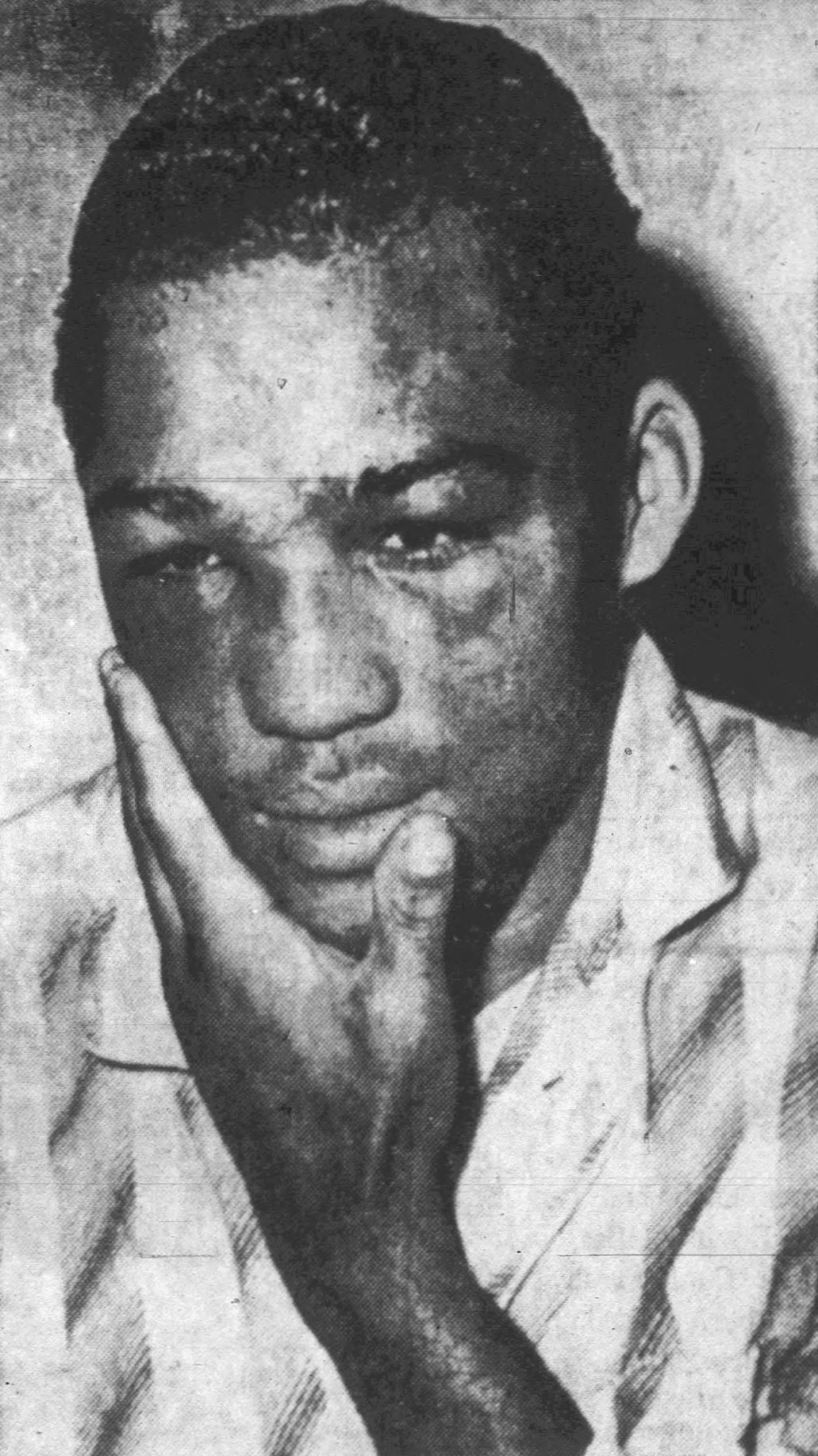
- Ramos in 1963

Personal information
- Nationality: Mexican
- Born: Ultiminio Ramos Zaqueira; 2 December 1941 Matanzas, Cuba
- Died: 3 September 2017 (aged 75) Mexico City, Mexico
- Height: 5 ft 4 1/2 in (164 cm)
- Weight: Featherweight; Lightweight

Boxing career
- Reach: 68 in (173 cm)
- Stance: Orthodox

Boxing record
- Total fights: 66
- Wins: 55
- Win by KO: 40
- Losses: 7
- Draws: 4

Ultiminio Ramos Zaqueira (2 December 1941 – 3 September 2017) was a Cuban-born Mexican professional boxer who was better known as Sugar Ramos. Ramos fought out of Mexico where he was adopted as a national hero. He was an Undisputed Featherweight Champion and member of the International Boxing Hall of Fame.

== Exile ==
Ramos won the Cuban featherweight championship belt in 1960 and defected to Mexico City when Fidel Castro came into power.

== Famous bouts ==
In Mexico, Ultiminio "Sugar" Ramos built his historical career. On 21 March 1963, Ramos had a bout scheduled at Dodger Stadium. On that day, Ramos severely beat Davey Moore. In the 10th round, Moore was knocked out. Four days later, Moore died from injuries sustained to his brain stem. This was similar to Ramos' twelfth professional fight in which José Blanco died from injuries sustained in the fight.

Ramos would defend his title three times including against Ghanaian challenger Floyd Robertson, via a controversial split decision victory.

Ramos lost his titles in 1964 to Vicente Saldivar after the fight was stopped in the twelfth round due to cuts. Ramos then moved up to lightweight, eventually earning a shot at then champion Carlos Ortiz in 1966. Ramos would lose the fight via fifth-round TKO, and then an immediate rematch by TKO in the fourth round.

He continued boxing until 1972.

== Professional boxing record ==
66 fights	55 wins	7 losses
By knockout	40	4
By decision	14	2
By disqualification	1	1
Draws	4	

No.	Result	Record	Opponent	Type	Round, time	Date	Location	Notes
66	Loss	55–7–4	Cesar Sinda	TKO	10 (10)	24 Apr 1972	The Forum, Inglewood, California, U.S.	
65	Win	55–6–4	Lyle Randolph	TKO	6 (10)	24 Mar 1971	International Amphitheatre, Chicago, Illinois, U.S	
64	Draw	54–6–4	Jimmy Robertson	PTS	10	14 Oct 1971	Olympic Auditorium, Los Angeles, California, U.S.	
63	Loss	54–6–3	Antonio Amaya	PTS	10	1 Oct 1971	Plaza de Toros Monumental, Monterrey, Mexico	
62	Loss	54–5–3	Mando Ramos	SD	10	6 Aug 1970	Olympic Auditorium, Los Angeles, California, U.S.	
61	Win	54–4–3	Raul Rojas	MD	10	26 Mar 1970	Olympic Auditorium, Los Angeles, California, U.S.	
60	Win	53–4–3	German Gatelbondo	KO	1 (10)	14 Dec 1969	Veracruz, Mexico	
59	Win	52–4–3	Chango Carmona	TKO	7 (10)	29 Sep 1969	Plaza de Toros El Toreo, Tijuana, Mexico	
58	Win	51–4–3	Rudy Gonzalez	KO	2 (10)	29 Jun 1969	Plaza de Toros México, Mexico City, Mexico	
57	Loss	50–4–3	Carlos Ortiz	TKO	4 (15)	1 Jul 1967	Hiram Bithorn Stadium, San Juan, Puerto Rico	For WBA, WBC, and The Ring lightweight titles
56	Loss	50–3–3	Carlos Ortiz	TKO	5 (15)	22 Oct 1966	Toreo de Cuatro Caminos, Mexico City, Mexico	For WBA, WBC, and The Ring lightweight titles
55	Win	50–2–3	Antonio Herrera	UD	10	12 Feb 1966	Plaza de Toros México, Mexico City, Mexico	
54	Win	49–2–3	Raul Soriano	TKO	2 (10)	11 Dec 1965	Toreo de Cuatro Caminos, Mexico City, Mexico	
53	Win	48–2–3	Raul Soriano	TKO	6 (10)	23 Aug 1965	Plaza de Toros El Toreo, Tijuana, Mexico	
52	Win	47–2–3	Delfino Rosales	TKO	1 (10)	15 Jun 1965	Plaza de Toros, Ciudad Juárez, Mexico	
51	Win	46–2–3	Antonio Rosales	UD	10	17 Apr 1965	Arena Coliseo, Acapulco, Mexico	
50	Loss	45–2–3	Vicente Saldivar	RTD	12 (15)	26 Sep 1964	Toreo de Cuatro Caminos, Mexico City, Mexico	Lost WBA, WBC, and The Ring featherweight titles
49	Win	45–1–3	Floyd Robertson	SD	15	9 May 1964	Accra Sports Stadium, Accra, Ghana	Retained WBA, WBC, and The Ring featherweight titles
48	Win	44–1–3	Mitsunori Seki	TKO	6 (15)	1 Mar 1964	Kokugikan, Tokyo, Japan	Retained WBA, WBC, and The Ring featherweight titles
47	Win	43–1–3	Vicente Milan Derado	UD	10	1 Jan 1964	Olympic Auditorium, Los Angeles, California, U.S.	
46	Win	42–1–3	Kid Anahuac	TKO	8 (10)	9 Nov 1963	Los Mochis, Mexico	
45	Win	41–1–3	Sammy McSpadden	TKO	2 (10)	22 Oct 1963	Empire Pool, Wembley, England, U.K	
44	Win	40–1–3	Rafiu King	UD	15	13 Jul 1963	Arena México, Mexico City, Mexico	Retained WBA, WBC, and The Ring featherweight titles
43	Win	39–1–3	Davey Moore	RTD	10 (15)	21 Mar 1963	Dodger Stadium, Los Angeles, California, U.S.	Won WBA, The Ring, and inaugural WBC featherweight titles; Moore dies two days later of a whiplash to his brain stem after his neck struck the bottom rope of a three-rope ring during this bout.
42	Win	38–1–3	Jose Luis Cruz	TKO	2 (10)	29 Dec 1962	Toreo de Cuatro Caminos, Mexico City, Mexico	
41	Win	37–1–3	Eloy Sanchez	TKO	3 (10)	20 Oct 1962	Mexico City, Mexico	
40	Win	36–1–3	Baby Vasquez	KO	10 (10)	3 Sep 1962	Plaza de Toros, Tijuana, Mexico	
39	Win	35–1–3	Baby Vasquez	PTS	10	14 Jul 1962	Arena México, Mexico City, Mexico	
38	Win	34–1–3	Danny Valdez	TKO	7 (10)	11 May 1962	Olympic Auditorium, Los Angeles, California, U.S.	
37	Win	33–1–3	Rafiu King	PTS	10	26 Mar 1962	Palais des Sports, Paris, France	
36	Win	32–1–3	Eddie Garcia	TKO	9 (10)	12 Jan 1962	Olympic Auditorium, Los Angeles, California, U.S.	
35	Loss	31–1–3	Rafael Camacho	DQ	4 (10)	13 Dec 1961	Puebla, Mexico	
34	Win	31–0–3	Kid Anahuac	PTS	10	30 Sep 1961	Arena Coliseo, Guadalajara, Mexico	
33	Draw	30–0–3	Alfredo Urbina	PTS	10	2 Sep 1961	Mexico City, Mexico	
32	Win	30–0–2	Alfredo Urbina	SD	12	17 Jun 1961	Mexico City, Mexico	
31	Win	29–0–2	Bobby Cervantes	KO	4 (10)	27 May 1961	Arena Coliseo, Guadalajara, Mexico	
30	Win	28–0–2	Felix Cervantes	KO	3 (10)	8 May 1961	Plaza de Toros, Tijuana, Mexico	
29	Draw	27–0–2	Juan Ramirez	TD	7 (10)	22 Apr 1961	Mexico City, Mexico	
28	Win	27–0–1	Edwin Sykes	KO	4 (10)	5 Feb 1961	Estadio Juan D. Arosemena, Panama City, Panama	
27	Win	26–0–1	Jesus Santamaria	TKO	6 (10)	23 Jan 1961	Estadio Juan D. Arosemena, Panama City, Panama	
26	Win	25–0–1	Sergio Gomez	KO	9 (10)	30 Dec 1960	Havana, Cuba	
25	Win	24–0–1	Jesus Santamaria	TKO	9 (10)	28 Aug 1960	Arena de Colon, Colón, Panama	
24	Win	23–0–1	Tony Padron	KO	8 (10)	18 Aug 1960	Coliseo Nacional, Havana, Cuba	
23	Win	22–0–1	Vernon Lynch	TKO	7 (10)	28 May 1960	Havana, Cuba	
22	Win	21–0–1	Tony Padron	TKO	8 (10)	1 Apr 1960	Caracas, Venezuela	
21	Win	20–0–1	Orlando Castillo	PTS	12	27 Feb 1960	Havana, Cuba	Won vacant Cuban featherweight title
20	Win	19–0–1	Francisco Barraez	PTS	10	20 Nov 1959	Matanzas, Cuba	
19	Draw	18–0–1	Ike Chestnut	PTS	10	31 Oct 1959	Nuevo Circo, Caracas, Venezuela	
18	Win	18–0	Johnny Bean	KO	3 (10)	1 Aug 1959	Havana, Cuba	
17	Win	17–0	Sonny Leon	PTS	10	29 Jul 1959	Nuevo Circo, Caracas, Venezuela	
16	Win	16–0	Angel Guerrero	KO	4 (10)	9 May 1959	Coliseo de la Ciudad, Havana, Cuba	
15	Win	15–0	Wally Livingston	TKO	10 (10)	28 Apr 1959	Havana, Cuba	
14	Win	14–0	Orlando Castillo	KO	10 (10)	14 Feb 1959	Havana, Cuba	
13	Win	13–0	Antonio Coria	KO	4 (?)	13 Dec 1958	Havana, Cuba	
12	Win	12–0	Jose Blanco	KO	8 (8)	8 Nov 1958	Havana, Cuba	Blanco dies of injuries sustained in this fight
11	Win	11–0	Augo Narvalle	DQ	6 (?)	11 Oct 1958	Havana, Cuba	
10	Win	10–0	Al Castillo	KO	5 (?)	20 Sep 1958	Coliseo de la Ciudad, Havana, Cuba	
9	Win	9–0	Wilfredo Gonzalez	KO	2 (?)	9 Aug 1958	Cienfuegos, Cuba	
8	Win	8–0	Manuel Perdomo	PTS	6	19 Jul 1958	Havana, Cuba	
7	Win	7–0	Hector Medina	KO	3 (?)	5 Jul 1958	Havana, Cuba	
6	Win	6–0	Humberto de la Rosa	KO	4 (?)	24 May 1958	Havana, Cuba	
5	Win	5–0	Felix Pomares	KO	2 (?)	12 Apr 1958	Havana, Cuba	
4	Win	4–0	Carlos Suarez	KO	3 (?)	7 Feb 1958	Ranchuelo, Cuba	
3	Win	3–0	Juan Machado	KO	2 (4)	11 Jan 1958	Arena Trejo, Havana, Cuba	
2	Win	2–0	Inocencio Cartas	TKO	3 (4)	30 Nov 1957	Palacio de Deportes, Havana, Cuba	
1	Win	1–0	Rene Arce	TKO	2 (4)	5 Oct 1957	Palacio de Deportes, Havana, Cuba	

== Titles in boxing ==
=== Major world titles ===
- WBA featherweight champion (126 lbs)
- WBC featherweight champion (Note: Inaugural champion.) (126 lbs)

=== The Ring magazine titles ===
- The Ring featherweight champion (126 lbs)

=== Regional/International titles ===
- Cuban featherweight champion (126 lbs)

=== Undisputed titles ===
- Undisputed featherweight champion

== Death ==
Sugar Ramos died at the age of 75 on 3 September 2017 in his adopted home of Mexico City due to complications from cancer. He was survived by his four children.

== See also ==
- List of Mexican boxing world champions
- List of world featherweight boxing champions

== Notes and references ==
=== References ===
Sporting positions
Regional boxing titles
Vacant Title last held by Martin Guije Rodriguez	Cuban featherweight champion February 27, 1960 – 1962; Professional boxing banned in Cuba	Vacant
World boxing titles
Preceded by Davey Moore	WBA featherweight champion March 21, 1963 – September 26, 1964	Succeeded by Vicente Saldivar
Inaugural champion	WBC featherweight champion March 21, 1963 – September 26, 1964	Succeeded by Vicente Saldivar
Preceded by Davey Moore	The Ring featherweight champion March 21, 1963 – September 26, 1964	Succeeded by Vicente Saldivar
Preceded by Davey Moore	Undisputed featherweight champion March 21, 1963 – September 26, 1964	Succeeded by Vicente Saldivar
Awards
Previous: José Torres vs. Willie Pastrano; Round 6	The Ring Round of the Year vs. Carlos Ortiz I Round 5; 1966	Next: Dick Tiger vs. Roger Rouse; Round 12
