= Howard Winstone =

Welsh boxer (1939-2000)

Howard Winstone MBE
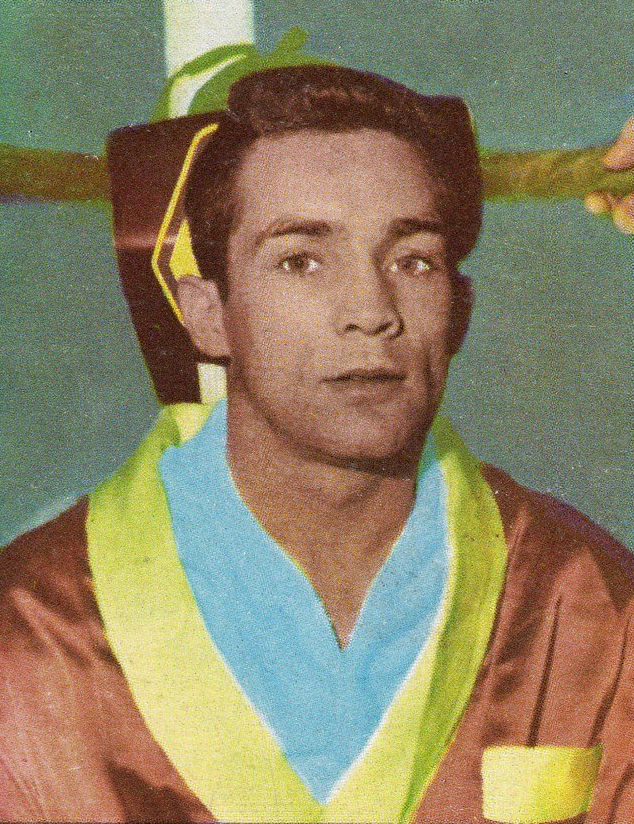

Personal information
- Nickname: The Welsh Wizard
- Nationality: British
- Born: 15 April 1939 Merthyr Tydfil, Wales
- Died: 20 September 2000 (aged 61) Merthyr Tydfil, Wales
- Height: 5 ft 5 in (1.65 m)
- Weight: Featherweight

Boxing career
- Stance: Orthodox

Boxing record
- Total fights: 67
- Wins: 61
- Win by KO: 27
- Losses: 6
Medal record
Men's Boxing
Representing Wales
Commonwealth Games
Gold medal – first place	1958 Cardiff	Bantamweight

Howard Winstone, MBE (15 April 1939 – 30 September 2000) was a Welsh world champion boxer, born in Merthyr Tydfil, Wales. As an amateur, Winstone won the Amateur Boxing Association bantamweight title in 1958, and a Commonwealth Games Gold Medal at the 1958 British Empire and Commonwealth Games in Cardiff.

== Boxing style ==
In his early amateur days Winstone was very much a two-fisted fighter, but as a teenager, whilst working in a local toy factory, he lost the tips of three fingers on his right hand in an accident. As a result, he lost much of the punching power in his right hand and so had to change his style to rely much more on a straight left.

== Amateur career ==
Winstone won 83 of his 86 amateur fights, and in 1958 he was the ABA bantamweight champion.

Representing Wales at the 1958 British Empire and Commonwealth Games in Cardiff, Winstone won the gold medal at bantamweight. Winstone won the first of his three BBC Wales Sports Personality of the Year awards the same year (1958) – winning his second in 1963 and his third in 1967.

== Professional career ==
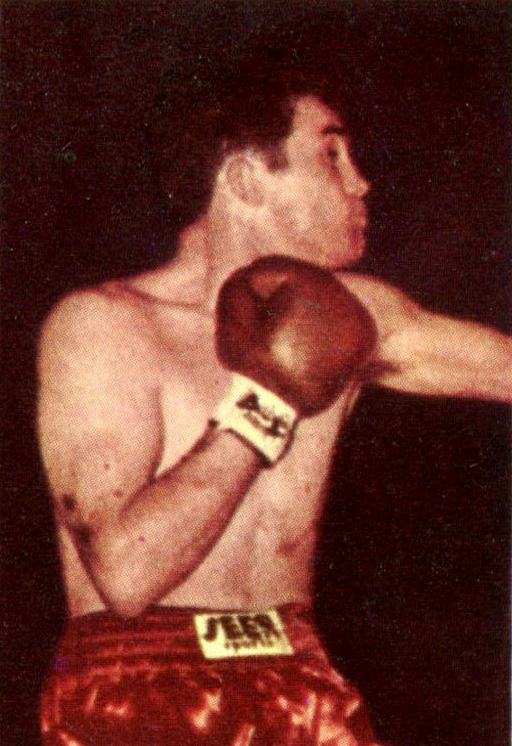
Howard Winstone c. 1967

Winstone turned professional in 1959 and was managed by former European welterweight champion, Eddie Thomas.

Winstone made his professional debut in February 1959 at Wembley Stadium, London, when he beat Billy Graydon on points over six rounds. He then proceeded to win his first 24 fights, at which point he was considered ready for a shot at the British featherweight title.

In May 1961 he fought Terry Spinks the holder of the British featherweight title at the Empire Pool, Wembley. He out-boxed Spinks, forcing him to retire after ten rounds, and so claimed the British title.

He continued to win all his contests and in April 1962 he defended his title against Derry Treanor, at the Empire Pool, winning by a technical knockout in the fourteenth round. The next month he defended his title against Harry Carroll in Cardiff forcing him to retire after six rounds.

His first defeat came in November 1962 his 35th fight after 34 straight wins. He was beaten by Leroy Jeffery, an American featherweight, by a technical knockout in the second round after having been knocked down three times.

In January 1963, he defended his British title for the third time, defeating Johnny Morrisey by a technical knockout in the eleventh, in Glasgow.

In July 1963, he challenged for the European featherweight title, fighting Italian holder, Alberto Serti in Cardiff. Winstone won the title when the referee stopped the fight in the fourteenth round.

One month later he defended both titles against Billy Calvert in Porthcawl, winning on points over fifteen rounds. In December 1963 he again defended his titles against John O'Brien, again winning on points.

In January 1964 he suffered only his second defeat in 45 fights, losing to the American, Don Johnson.

In May 1964 he defended his European title against Italian, Lino Mastellaro at the Empire Pool, winning by a technical knockout in the Eighth round.

In January 1965 he defended his European title again, against Frenchman, Yves Desmarets in Rome. He won on points over fifteen rounds.

== World title fights ==
In September 1965 he challenged for the WBA and WBC world featherweight titles held by the Mexican southpaw, Vicente Saldivar. The fight was held at Earls Court Arena, London and Saldivar won on points over fifteen rounds.

In March 1966 he defended his European title against Andrea Silanos in Italy winning by a technical knockout in the fifteenth round. In September 1966 he defended it against Belgian, Jean de Keers at Wembley and won on a technical knockout in three rounds.

In December 1966 he defended his British and European titles against the Welsh featherweight, Lennie Williams, defeating him at Port Talbot in eight rounds.

In June 1967 he was ready for another world title challenge against Vicente Saldivar, this time in Cardiff, but again lost on points, although the decision favoured Saldivar by only half a point.

Four months later, in October 1967, he fought Saldivar again, this time in Mexico City, but lost after being knocked down in the seventh and twelfth rounds. His manager threw in the towel in the twelfth.

After his latest successful defence, Saldivar announced his retirement leaving his world title vacant. In January 1968, Winstone fought the Japanese, Mitsunori Seki for the vacant WBC world featherweight title at the Royal Albert Hall. He won when the fight was stopped in the ninth due to a cut eye, and so finally gained a world title. Saldivar was in the audience to see his vacated title won by his old rival.

In July 1968 he defended his newly won world title against the Cuban, José Legrá, at Porthcawl, Wales. Although Winstone had beaten Legra twice before, he was knocked down twice in the first round. He continued fighting, but unfortunately he sustained a badly swollen left eye, which caused the bout to be stopped in the fifth round. Having lost the world title in his first defence, Winstone decided to retire at the age of 29.

== Professional boxing record ==
67 fights	61 wins	6 losses
By knockout	27	3
By decision	33	3
By disqualification	1	0

No.	Result	Record	Opponent	Type	Round, time	Date	Location	Notes
67	Loss	61–6	José Legrá	TKO	5 (15)	1968-07-24	Coney Beach Arena, Porthcawl, Wales, U.K.	Lost WBC featherweight title
66	Win	61–5	Jimmy Anderson	PTS	10 (10)	1968-04-09	Empire Pool, London, England, U.K.	
65	Win	60–5	Mitsunori Seki	TKO	9 (15)	1968-01-23	Royal Albert Hall, London, England, U.K.	Won vacant WBC featherweight title
64	Loss	59–5	Vicente Saldivar	TKO	12 (15)	1967-10-14	Estadio Azteca, Mexico City, Distrito Federal, Mexico	For WBA, WBC & The Ring featherweight titles
63	Loss	59–4	Vicente Saldivar	PTS	15 (15)	1967-06-15	Ninian Park, Cardiff, Wales, U.K.	For WBA, WBC & The Ring featherweight titles
62	Win	59–3	Richard Sue	PTS	10 (10)	1967-01-17	Royal Albert Hall, London, England, U.K.	
61	Win	58–3	Lennie Williams	TKO	8 (15)	1966-12-07	Afan Lido, Port Talbot, Wales, U.K.	Retained British & European featherweight titles
60	Win	57–3	Don Johnson	DQ	4 (10)	1966-10-10	Free Trade Hall, Manchester, England, U.K.	
59	Win	56–3	Jean De Keers	TKO	3 (15)	1966-09-06	Empire Pool, London, England, U.K.	Retained European featherweight title
58	Win	55–3	Andrea Silanos	TKO	15 (15)	1966-03-07	Teatro Verdi, Sassari, Italy	Retained European featherweight title
57	Win	54–3	Brian Cartwright	TKO	9 (10)	1965-12-13	National Sporting Club, London, England, U.K.	
56	Loss	53–3	Vicente Saldivar	PTS	15 (15)	1965-09-07	Earls Court Exhibition Centre, London, England, U.K.	For WBA, WBC & The Ring featherweight titles
55	Win	53–2	José Legrá	PTS	10 (10)	1965-06-22	Winter Gardens, Blackpool, England, U.K.	
54	Win	52–2	Eduardo Guerrero	TKO	5 (10)	1965-06-01	Empire Pool, London, England, U.K.	
53	Win	51–2	Don Johnson	PTS	10 (10)	1965-03-29	Market Hall, Carmarthen, Wales, U.K.	
52	Win	50–2	Yves Desmarets	PTS	15 (15)	1965-01-22	Palazzetto dello Sport, Roma, Italy	Retained European featherweight title
51	Win	49–2	Boualem Belouard	PTS	10 (10)	1964-12-14	Ice Rink, Nottingham, England, U.K.	
50	Win	48–2	Baby Luis	PTS	10 (10)	1964-12-01	Empire Pool, London, England, U.K.	
49	Win	47–2	Jose Bisbal	PTS	10 (10)	1964-09-21	Midland Hotel, Manchester, England, U.K.	
48	Win	46–2	Phil Lundgren	TKO	7 (10)	1964-06-22	National Sporting Club, London, England, U.K.	
47	Win	45–2	Lino Mastellaro	TKO	8 (15)	1964-05-12	Empire Pool, London, England, U.K.	Retained European featherweight title
46	Win	44–2	Rafiu King	PTS	10 (10)	1964-03-24	Empire Pool, London, England, U.K.	
45	Loss	43–2	Don Johnson	PTS	10 (10)	1964-01-28	Olympia, London, England, U.K.	
44	Win	43–1	John O'Brien	PTS	15 (15)	1963-12-09	National Sporting Club, London, England, U.K.	Retained British & European featherweight titles
43	Win	42–1	Miguel Calderin	PTS	10 (10)	1963-09-20	Corwen Pavilion, Corwen, Wales, U.K.	
42	Win	41–1	Billy Calvert	PTS	15 (15)	1963-08-20	Coney Beach Arena, Porthcawl, Wales, U.K.	Retained British & European featherweight titles
41	Win	40–1	Alberto Serti	TKO	14 (15)	1963-07-09	Maindy Stadium, Cardiff, Wales, U.K.	Won European featherweight title
40	Win	39–1	Juan Cardenas	PTS	8 (8)	1963-05-13	National Sporting Club, London, England, U.K.	
39	Win	38–1	Gracieux Lamperti	TKO	8 (10)	1963-04-29	Sophia Gardens Pavilion, Cardiff, Wales, U.K.	
38	Win	37–1	Johnny Morrisey	TKO	11 (15)	1963-01-31	Kelvin Hall, Glasgow, Scotland, U.K.	Retained British featherweight title
37	Win	36–1	Teddy Rand	TKO	3 (10)	1962-12-27	National Sporting Club, London, England, U.K.	
36	Win	35–1	Freddie Dobson	TKO	3 (8)	1962-12-10	Kings Hall, Manchester, England, U.K.	
35	Loss	34–1	Leroy Jeffery	TKO	2 (10)	1962-11-05	Queens Hall, Leeds, England, U.K.	
34	Win	34–0	Billy Davis	TKO	7 (10)	1962-09-11	Empire Pool, London, England, U.K.	
33	Win	33–0	George Bowes	PTS	10 (10)	1962-08-18	Newtown Pavilion, Newtown, Wales, U.K.	
32	Win	32–0	Dennis Adjei	PTS	8 (8)	1962-08-02	Sophia Gardens Pavilion, Cardiff, Wales, U.K.	
31	Win	31–0	Harry Carroll	RTD	6 (15)	1962-05-30	Maindy Stadium, Cardiff, Wales, U.K.	Retained British featherweight title
30	Win	30–0	Derry Treanor	TKO	14 (15)	1962-04-10	Empire Pool, London, England, U.K.	Retained British featherweight title
29	Win	29–0	Oripes dos Santos	PTS	8 (8)	1962-01-09	Royal Albert Hall, London, England, U.K.	
28	Win	28–0	Olli Mäki	PTS	8 (8)	1961-11-20	Ice Rink, Nottingham, England, U.K.	
27	Win	27–0	Gene Fosmire	PTS	10 (10)	1961-09-04	Sophia Gardens Pavilion, Cardiff, Wales, U.K.	
26	Win	26–0	Aryee Jackson	PTS	10 (10)	1961-08-24	Liverpool Stadium, Liverpool, England, U.K.	
25	Win	25–0	Terry Spinks	TKO	10 (15)	1961-05-02	Empire Pool, London, England, U.K.	Won British featherweight title
24	Win	24–0	Floyd Robertson	PTS	10 (10)	1961-01-19	Sophia Gardens Pavilion, Cardiff, Wales, U.K.	
23	Win	23–0	Roy Jacobs	PTS	10 (10)	1960-11-28	Market Hall, Carmarthen, Wales, U.K.	
22	Win	22–0	Jean Renard	PTS	10 (10)	1960-10-25	Empire Pool, London, England, U.K.	
21	Win	21–0	Jean Renard	TKO	8 (10)	1960-09-22	Sophia Gardens Pavilion, Cardiff, Wales, U.K.	
20	Win	20–0	Sergio Milan	TKO	6 (10)	1960-08-15	Ynys Field, Aberdare, Wales, U.K.	
19	Win	19–0	Phill Jones	PTS	10 (10)	1960-07-27	Coney Beach Arena, Porthcawl, Wales, U.K.	
18	Win	18–0	Noel Hazard	TKO	3 (10)	1960-06-23	Embassy Sportsdrome, Birmingham, England, U.K.	
17	Win	17–0	Con Mount Bassie	PTS	10 (10)	1960-05-19	Embassy Sportsdrome, Birmingham, England, U.K.	
16	Win	16–0	George Carroll	TKO	4 (10)	1960-05-09	Vetch Field, Swansea, Wales, U.K.	
15	Win	15–0	Gordon Blakey	RTD	8 (10)	1960-03-31	Sophia Gardens Pavilion, Cardiff, Wales, U.K.	
14	Win	14–0	Terry Rees	TKO	8 (10)	1960-02-24	Sophia Gardens Pavilion, Cardiff, Wales, U.K.	
13	Win	13–0	Colin Salcombe	TKO	6 (8)	1960-02-04	Embassy Sportsdrome, Birmingham, England, U.K.	
12	Win	12–0	Robbie Wilson	PTS	8 (8)	1960-01-25	National Sporting Club, London, England, U.K.	
11	Win	11–0	George O'Neill	RTD	7 (8)	1960-01-14	Drill Hall, Cardiff, Wales, U.K.	
10	Win	10–0	Billy Calvert	PTS	8 (8)	1959-12-14	National Sporting Club, London, England, U.K.	
9	Win	9–0	Joe Taylor	TKO	4 (8)	1959-09-14	Welfare Ground, Ebbw Vale, Wales, U.K.	
8	Win	8–0	Billy Calvert	TKO	7 (8)	1959-09-01	Ynys Field, Aberdare, Wales, U.K.	
7	Win	7–0	Hugh O'Neill	PTS	6 (6)	1959-08-08	Welfare Ground, Ebbw Vale, Wales, U.K.	
6	Win	6–0	Ollie Wyllie	PTS	6 (6)	1959-07-14	Ynys Field, Aberdare, Wales, U.K.	
5	Win	5–0	Jake O'Neale	PTS	6 (6)	1959-06-24	Coney Beach Arena, Porthcawl, Wales, U.K.	
4	Win	4–0	Jackie Bowers	PTS	6 (6)	1959-05-27	Sophia Gardens Pavilion, Cardiff, Wales, U.K.	
3	Win	3–0	Tommy Williams	PTS	6 (6)	1959-04-15	Sophia Gardens Pavilion, Cardiff, Wales, U.K.	
2	Win	2–0	Peter Sexton	PTS	6 (6)	1959-03-14	Stow Hill Drill Hall, Newport, Wales, U.K.	
1	Win	1–0	Billy Graydon	PTS	6 (6)	1959-02-24	Wembley Stadium, London, England, U.K.	

== Retirement ==
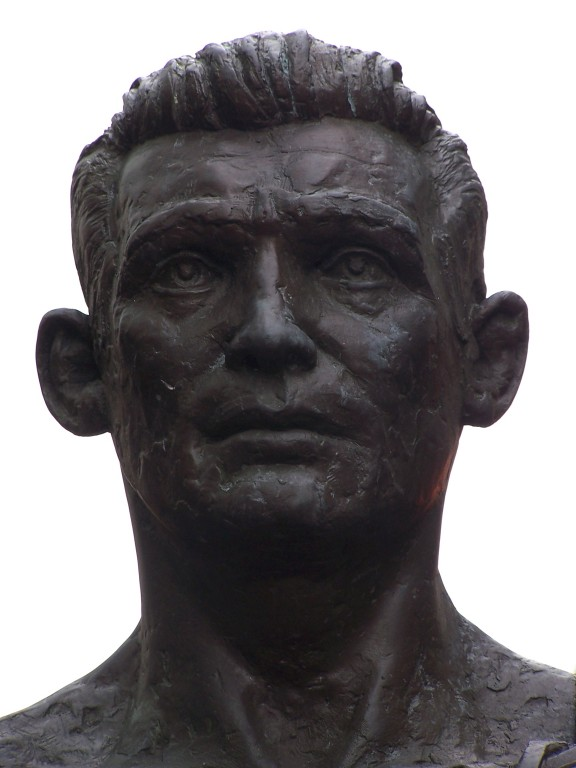
Bronze statue of Howard Winstone

He continued living in Merthyr Tydfil after retirement. In 1968 he was awarded the MBE. Later, he was made a Freeman of Merthyr Tydfil due to his boxing accomplishments. He died from kidney disease on 30 September 2000, aged 61.

In 2001, one year after his death, a bronze statue of Winstone by Welsh sculptor David Petersen was unveiled in St. Tydfil's Square, Merthyr Tydfil.

In 2005, he beat Owen Money, Richard Trevithick, Joseph Parry and Lady Charlotte Guest to be named "Greatest Citizen of Merthyr Tydfil", in a public vote competition run by Cyfarthfa Castle and Museum as part of the centenary celebrations to mark Merthyr's incorporation as a county borough in 1905.

His brother, Glyn Winstone continues to run a café business in the town's bus station under the boxing-themed trading-style "The Lonsdale Bar".

== Film ==
The life of Howard Winstone was made into a feature film called Risen Starring British actor Stuart Brennan as Howard Winstone which was released in 2011.

== See also ==
- List of outright winners of the Lonsdale belt
- List of Welsh world boxing champions
- List of British world boxing champions
- List of world featherweight boxing champions

Sporting positions
Amateur boxing titles
Previous: Johnny Morrissey	ABA Bantamweight champion 1958	Next: Don Weller
Regional boxing titles
Preceded by Terry Spinks	British featherweight champion 2 May 1961 – 1967; Vacated	Vacant Title next held by Jimmy Revie
Preceded by Alberto Serti	EBU featherweight champion 9 July 1963 – 1967; Vacated	Vacant Title next held by José Legrá
World boxing titles
Vacant Title last held by Vicente Saldivar	WBC featherweight champion 23 January 1968 – 24 July 1968	Succeeded by José Legrá
