= Fred C. Nelles Youth Correctional Facility =

Former youth detention center in Whittier, California

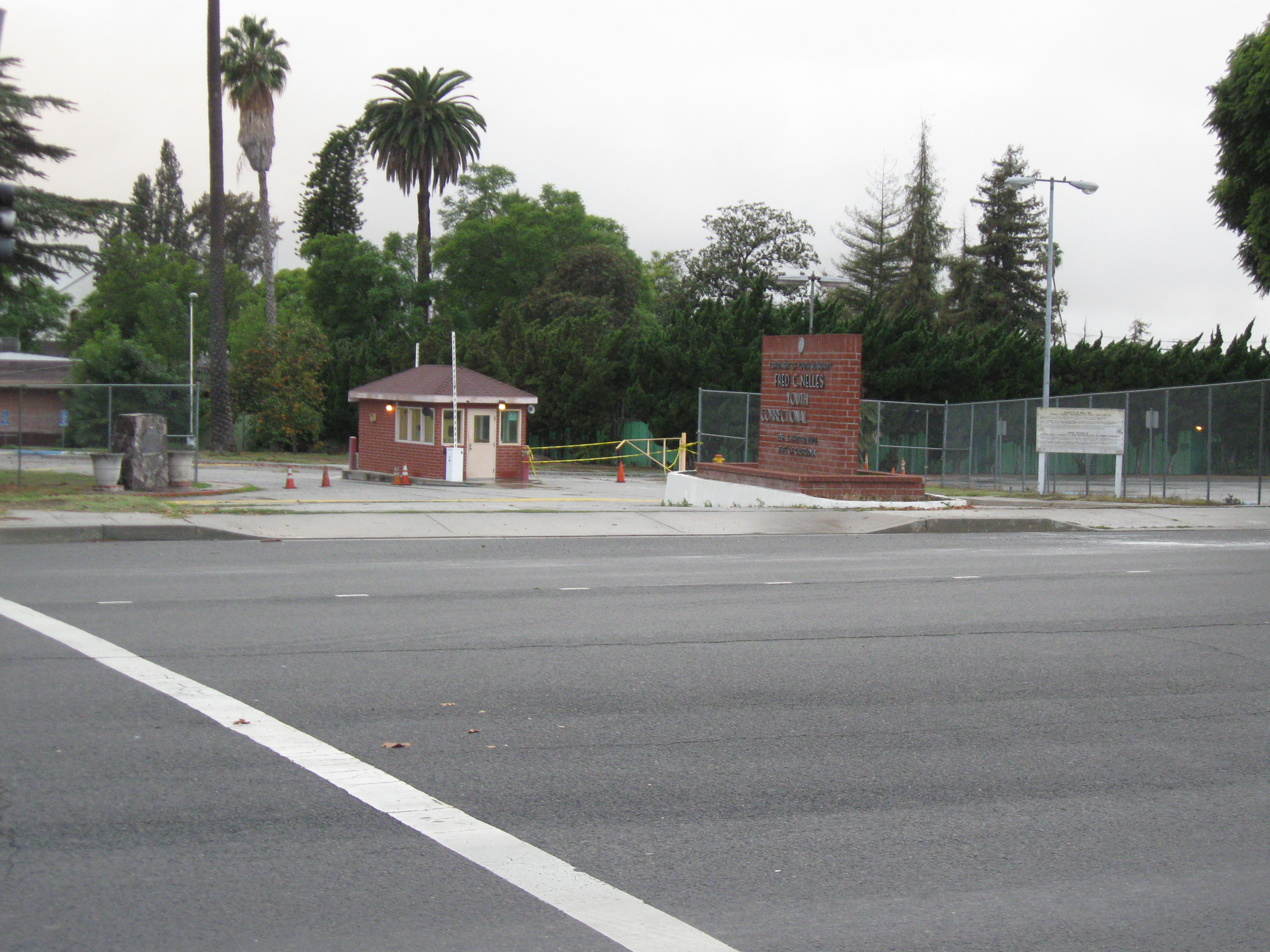
- Interactive map of Fred C. Nelles Youth Correctional Facility
- Location: Whittier, California; 33.975974°N 118.050982°W
- Status: Demolished in 2018
- Opened: 1891
- Closed: 2004
- Former name: Whittier State School; Nelles School for Boys

California Historical Landmark
- Official name: Reform School For Juvenile Offenders (Fred C. Nelles School)
- Reference no.: 947

The Fred C. Nelles Youth Correctional Facility was in essence a prison for youth located on Whittier Boulevard, in Whittier, California. Operated by the California Youth Authority, now part of California Department of Corrections, it once quartered young people incarcerated for law-breaking until it was closed by the state of California in June 2004. Open for 113 years, it had been the oldest juvenile facility in the state, and became registered as California Historical Landmark #947. It was closed because of the reduction in the number of juveniles being housed.

== History ==
Originally it was called the Whittier State School, when it opened in July 1891 as a reform school for boys and girls. The March 11, 1889 Act of the California Legislature authorized the establishment of a school for juvenile offenders.

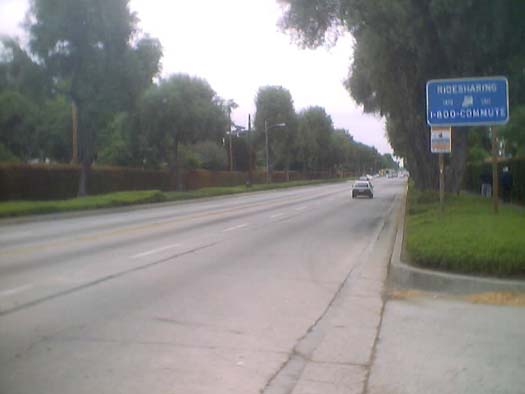
Picturesque Whittier Boulevard, near Fred C. Nelles Youth Correctional Facility

The state school was considered to have some of the best job training and music courses in the state for the first part of the twentieth century. In 1913, the girls were transferred to the newly established Ventura School for Girls and Whittier State Reformatory became a "Boys' School." In 1933, Erastus J. Milne, a former judge and bond salesman, was appointed superintendent of the School; Milne's tenure was marred by incompetence, especially by the deaths of wards Edward Leiva and Benny Moreno. Moreno's death was considered a suicide, however historian Jack Hodgson points to a culture of physical, psychological, and sexual abuse within Whittier, as well as inconsistencies in the state's official version of events to suggest that foul play cannot be ruled out.

Whittier was renamed 'Fred C. Nelles School for Boys' in 1941, to honor the longtime former superintendent of the school from 1912 to 1927. The 'For Boys' was eliminated from the name around 1970. In Roosevelt Hall, the dormitory, there was a complete lack of privacy. In fact, wards had to earn a private cell. The high school boys team was a notorious football rival of Whittier High School, but "every time someone broke out, all the Whittier schools would be notified," inevitably upsetting the community. It was also reported that chemical restraints were used in 274 incidents. Later in the 20th century, the daily population averaged 439 young people, the school had at one time housed nearly 1,000 wards. The last boy left the school in May 2004.

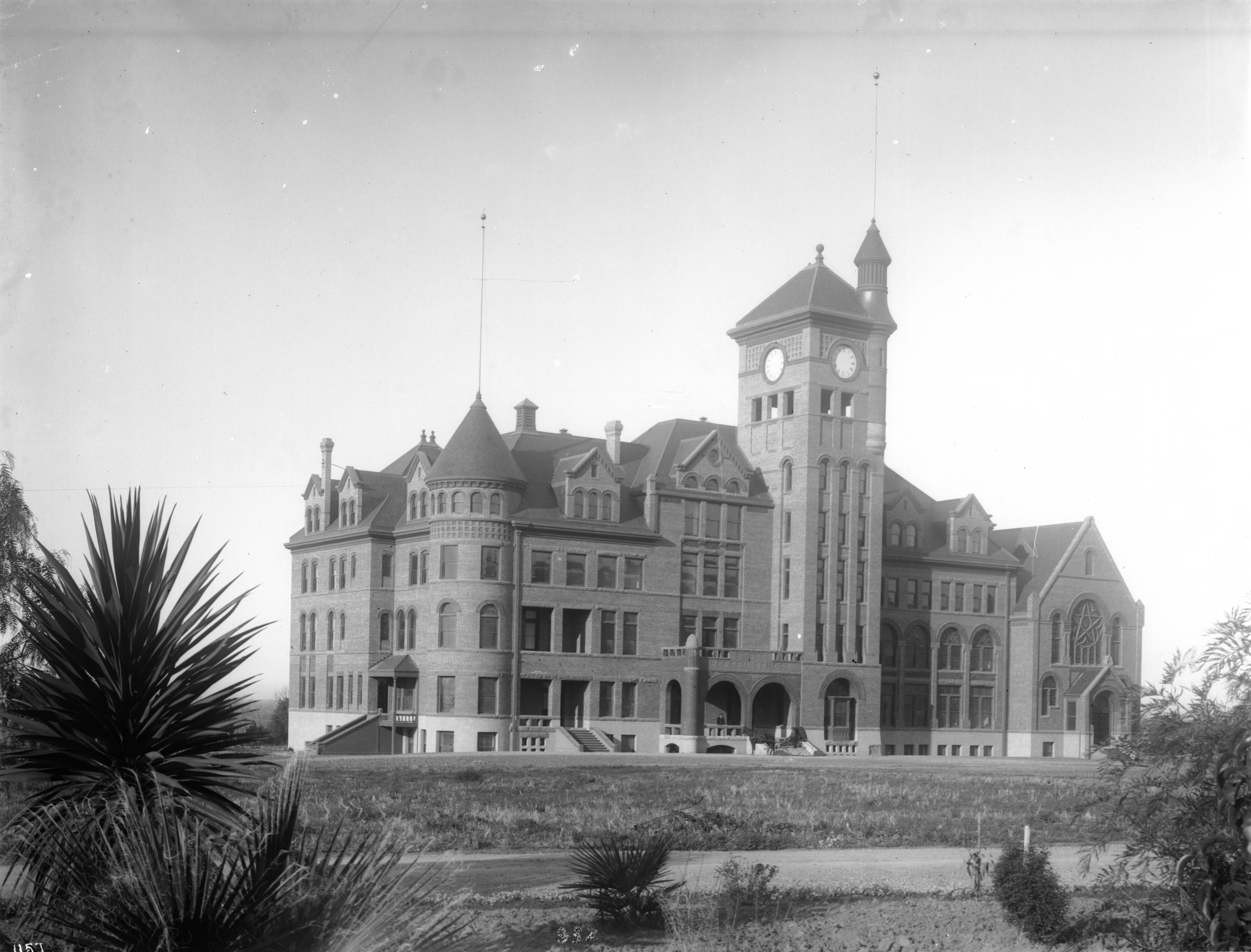
In 1901

== Land controversy ==
The Fred C. Nelles facility is located on a highly visible and significant section of Whittier Blvd., the town's major throughway. Whittier has grown into a fully developed city, with homes and businesses gradually surrounding the old facility. The concept of Nelles becoming a prison facility again was enabled by Assembly Bill 5 and Senate Bill 2. But, according to the San Gabriel Valley Tribune on April 25, 2010, historical protection and development of Nelles as a commercial center are likely to be in serious conflict. Nelles' 74-acres have been added to the list of state historical landmarks. Taken separately, the administration building that was constructed in 1928–29 has its own historical designation and must be protected, according to the State of California. On the campus there is also the superintendent's residence, the Catholic and Protestant chapels, and a gymnasium to be considered. The San Gabriel Valley Tribune, in its 2010 Thanksgiving edition, gave thanks for "The plans to revitalize Whittier Boulevard and properly develop the former Fred C. Nelles Youth Correctional Facility." The State of California has surmised that: "The Fred C. Nelles Youth Correctional Facility has a multi-layered history, which is significant to the City of Whittier and to the State of California." In 2014, Brookfield Residential Properties announced plans for a large retail, commercial and residential project on the site.

At the May 2015 Planning Commission and June 2015 City Council Public Hearings, the conflict between the preservation of historic monuments and the commercial development of the site stirred up significant controversy in the city of 86,000.

In June 2015, the Whittier Conservancy filed a lawsuit against the State of California to block the sale because the state was violating the state's own laws on the matter.

== Behind the fence ==
The location is currently used as a backlot for television and motion picture filming. The television show, The Othersiders, visited the facility. Ultimately, The Othersiders agreed that the Fred C. Nelles Youth Correctional Facility is haunted. They reported that you can "hear girls laughing in the chapel and ghostly bangs in the gym and garage." A recent visitor said that "I know every street here in Whittier and now I've come to a whole new area. It feels like I'm not in Whittier, like I've been transported to another state or another area in the country." Blow, a film starring Johnny Depp and Penélope Cruz contains scenes that were filmed at the Fred C. Nelles Youth Correctional Facility. Exteriors of a fictional state execution facility were filmed there with the facility's name seen in multiple shots.

=== Boot Camp ===
Abstract

"The boot camp model became a correctional panacea for juvenile offenders during the early 1990s, promising the best of both worlds—less recidivism and lower operating costs. Although there have been numerous studies of boot camp programs since that time, most have relied on non-randomized comparison groups. The California Youth Authority (CYA) experimental study of its juvenile boot camp and intensive parole program (called LEAD)—versus standard custody and parole—was an important exception, but its legislatively mandated in-house evaluation was prepared before complete outcome data was available. The present study capitalizes on full and relatively long-term follow-up arrest data for the LEAD evaluation provided by the California Department of Justice in August 2002. Using both survival models and negative binomial regression models, the results indicate that there were no significant differences between groups in terms of time to first arrest or average arrest frequency."

== Use in film, television, and music ==
Bad Teacher, a 2011 film starring Cameron Diaz and Jason Segel, shot some school scenes at the facility.

In July/August 2013, indie Sundance drama Camp X-Ray, starring Kristen Stewart and Peyman Moaadi filmed its prison scenes at the facility.

In late 2010 Kevin Smith shot his film Red State at the facility.

Prison Break filmed at the Fred C. Nelles Youth Correctional Facility.

The Game shot his music video for "Martians vs. Goblins" at the facility.

Tim Sullivan shot his film Driftwood at the Fred C. Nelles Youth Correctional Facility in 2006

Lexi DiBenedetto starred in the award-winning short film Love, is all you need? at the Fred C. Nelles Youth Correctional Facility in 2010, winning her Best Actress at the Sonoma International Film Festival.

Teen drama South of Nowhere used the facility as the location for King High School.

Various sketches for the Comedy Central Series Key & Peele were shot here including "I Said Biiiiitch" and "Das Negroes"

== California Historical Landmark Marker ==
California Historical Landmark Marker NO. 947 at the site reads:

- NO. 947 REFORM SCHOOL FOR JUVENILE OFFENDERS (FRED C. NELLES SCHOOL) - The March 11, 1889 Act of the California Legislature authorized the establishment of a school for juvenile offenders. Dedication and laying of cornerstone was done by Governor R. W. Waterman on February 12, 1890. Officially opened as 'Whittier State School' for boys and girls on July 1, 1891. Girls were transferred in 1916 and only boys have been in residence since that time. Renamed 'Fred C. Nelles School for Boys' in 1941 ('For Boys' was dropped around 1970). This school has been in continuous operation serving the needs of juvenile offenders since 1891.

== Gallery ==
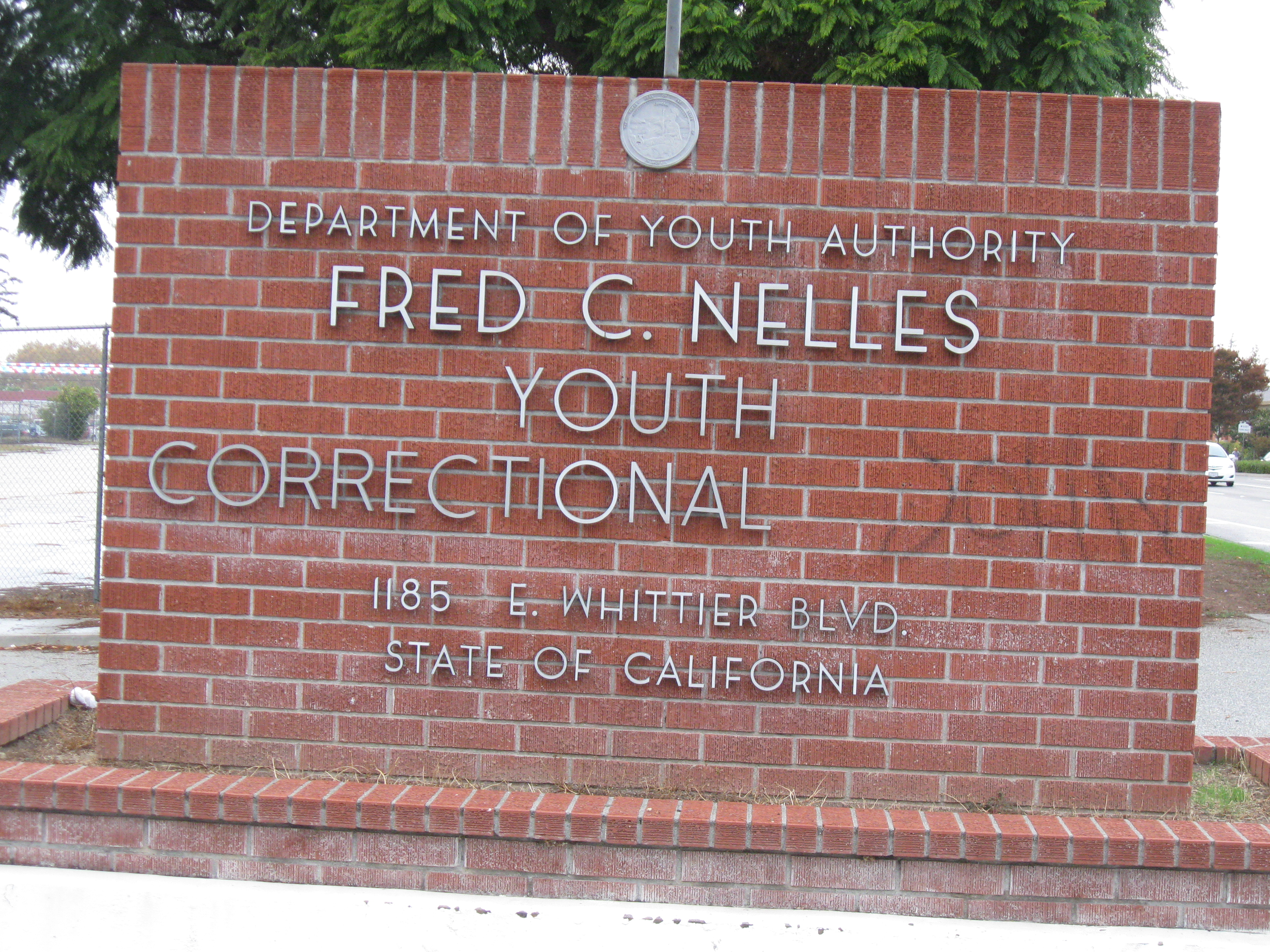
Sign at entrance

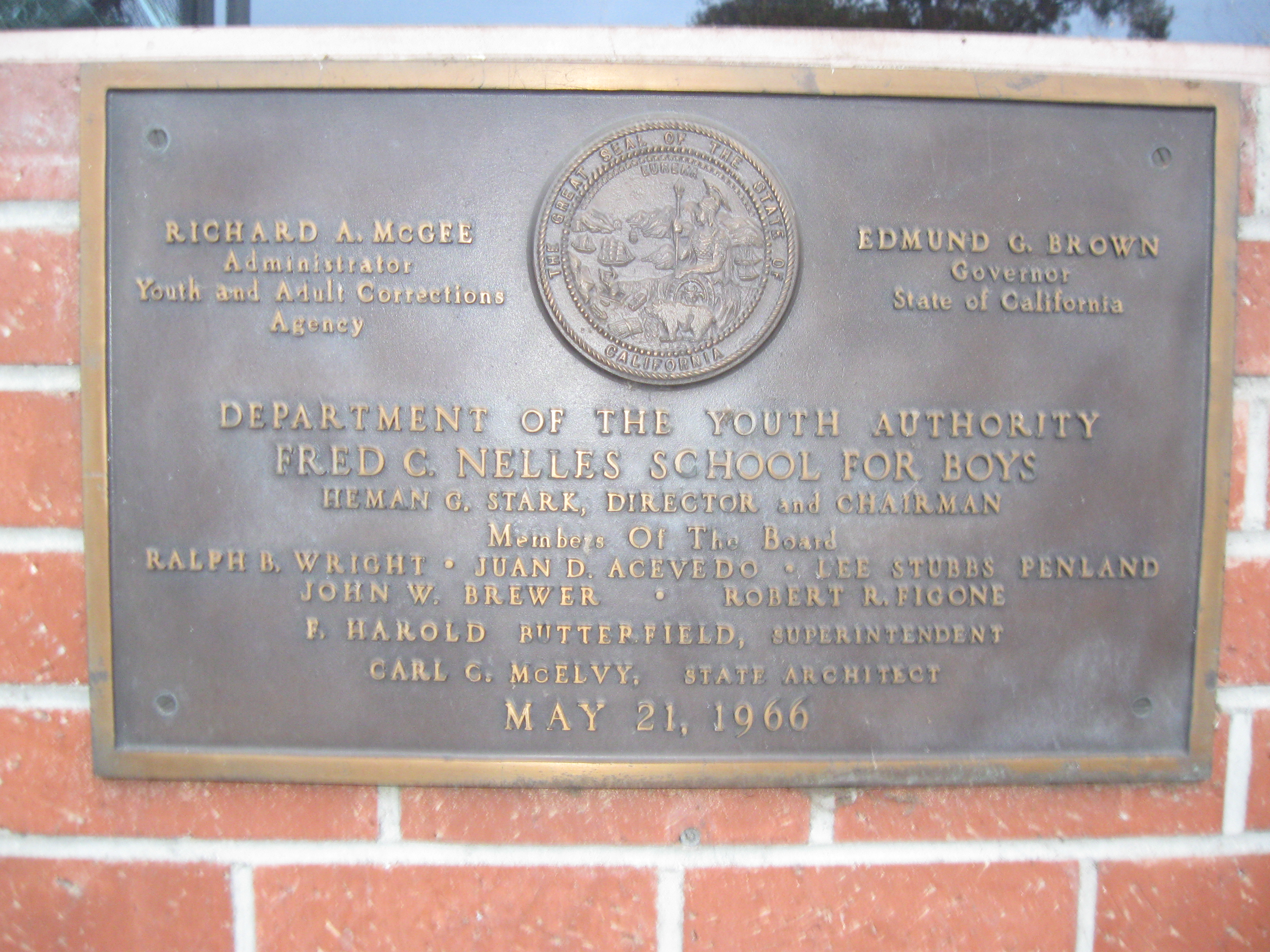
Large plaque at entrance, dated May 21, 1966

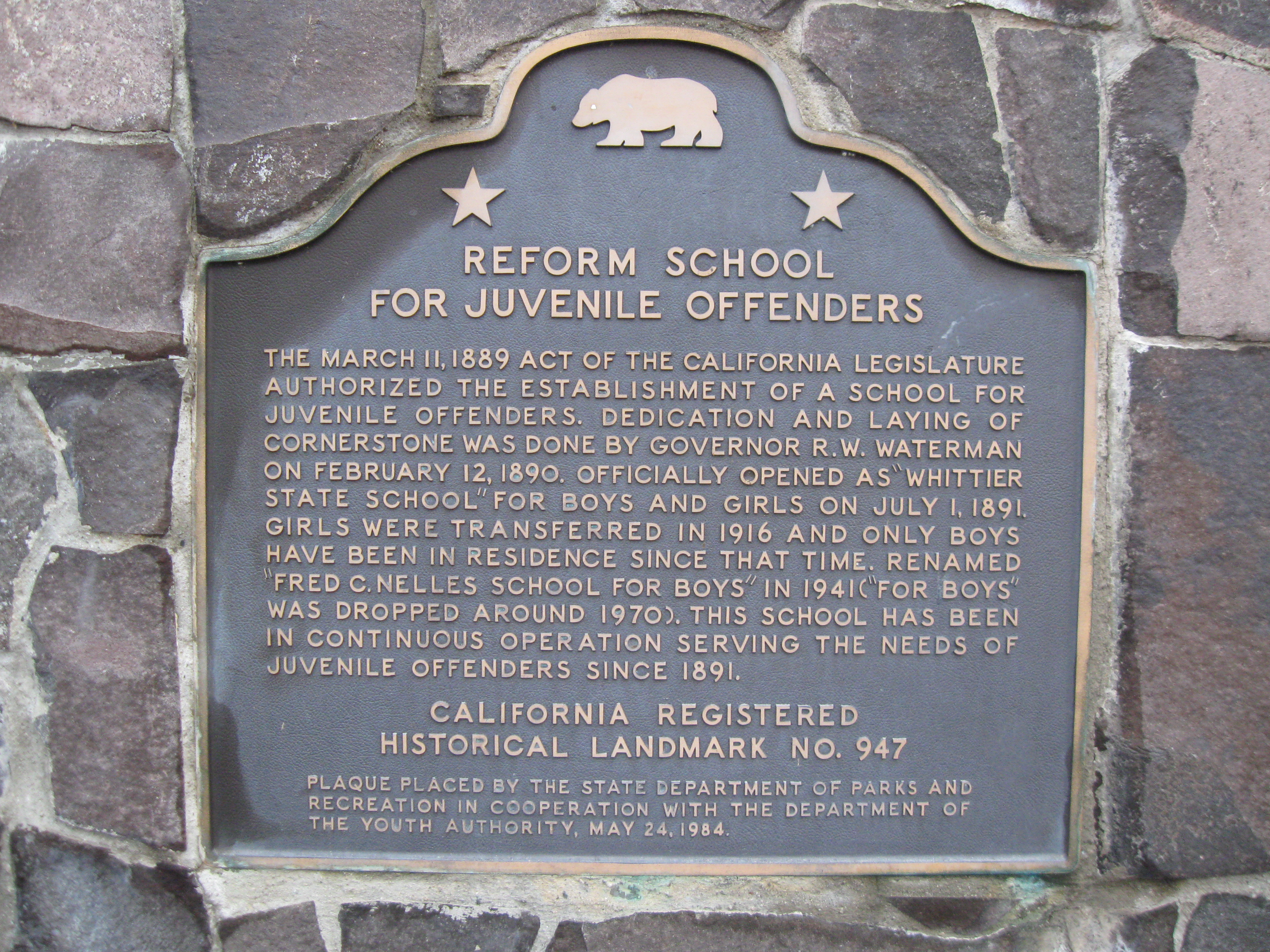
Landmark designation, dated May 24, 1984

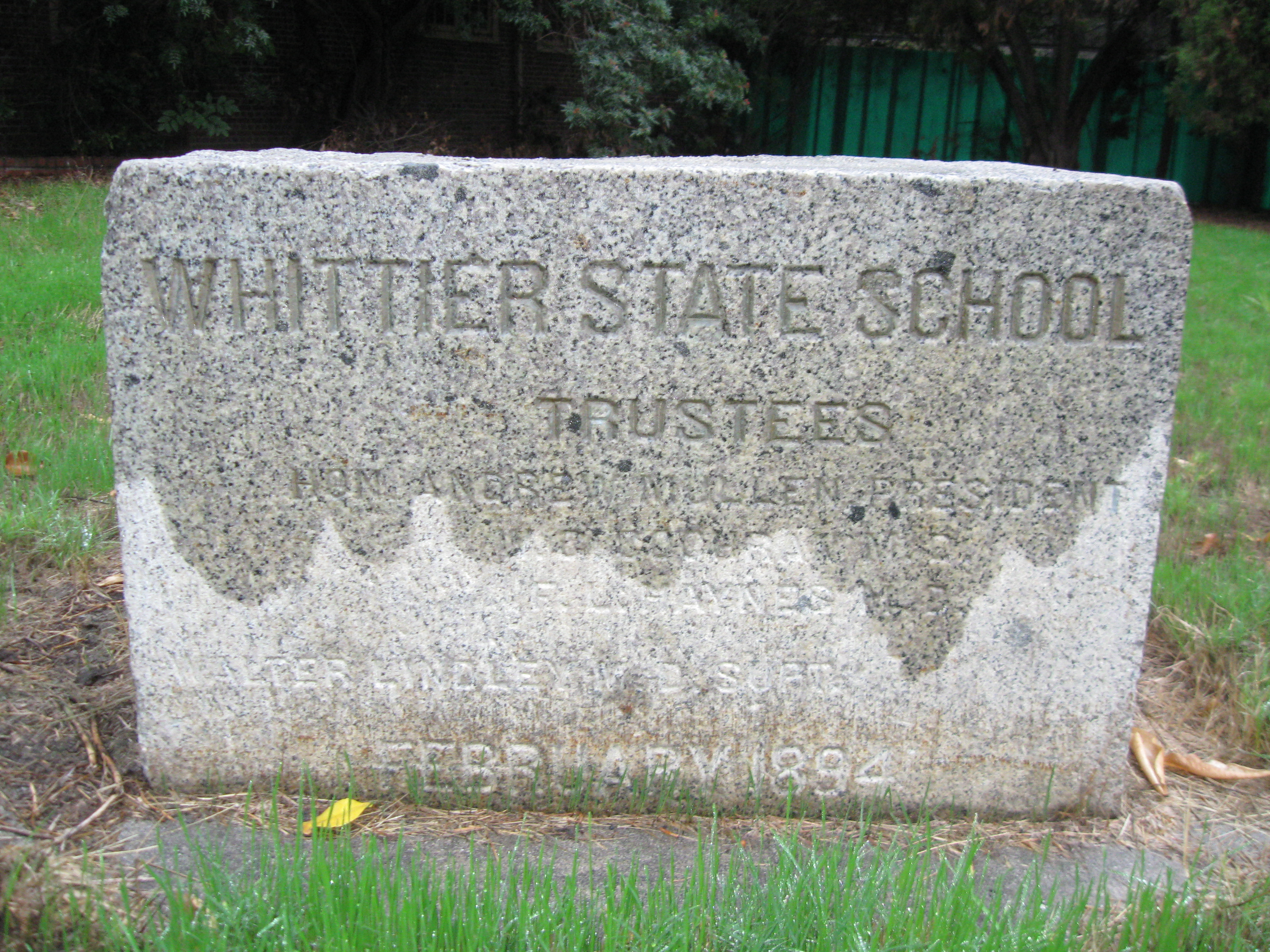
Stone with an 1894 date

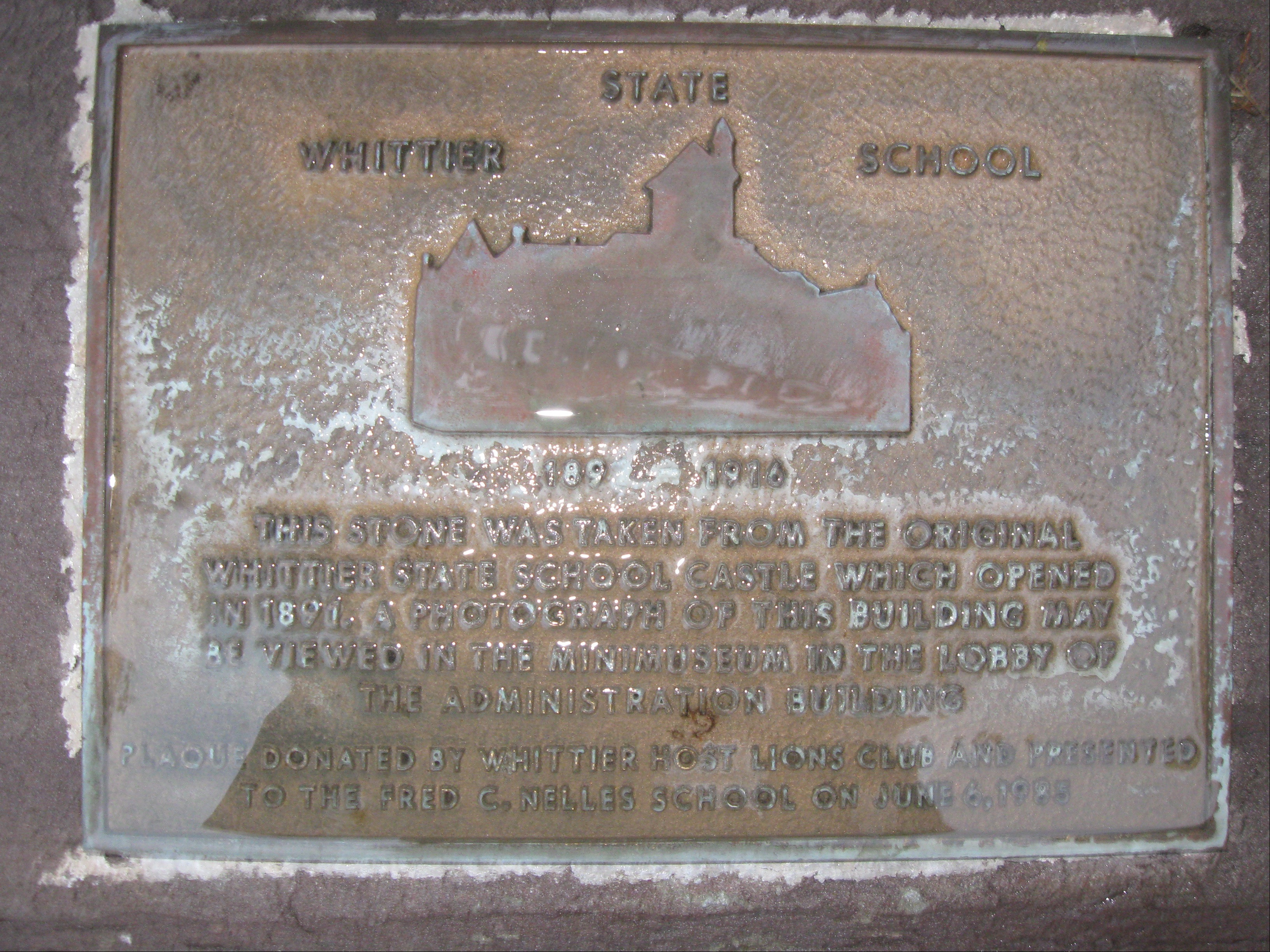
Plaque on a stone from old Castle building, dated June 6, 1985

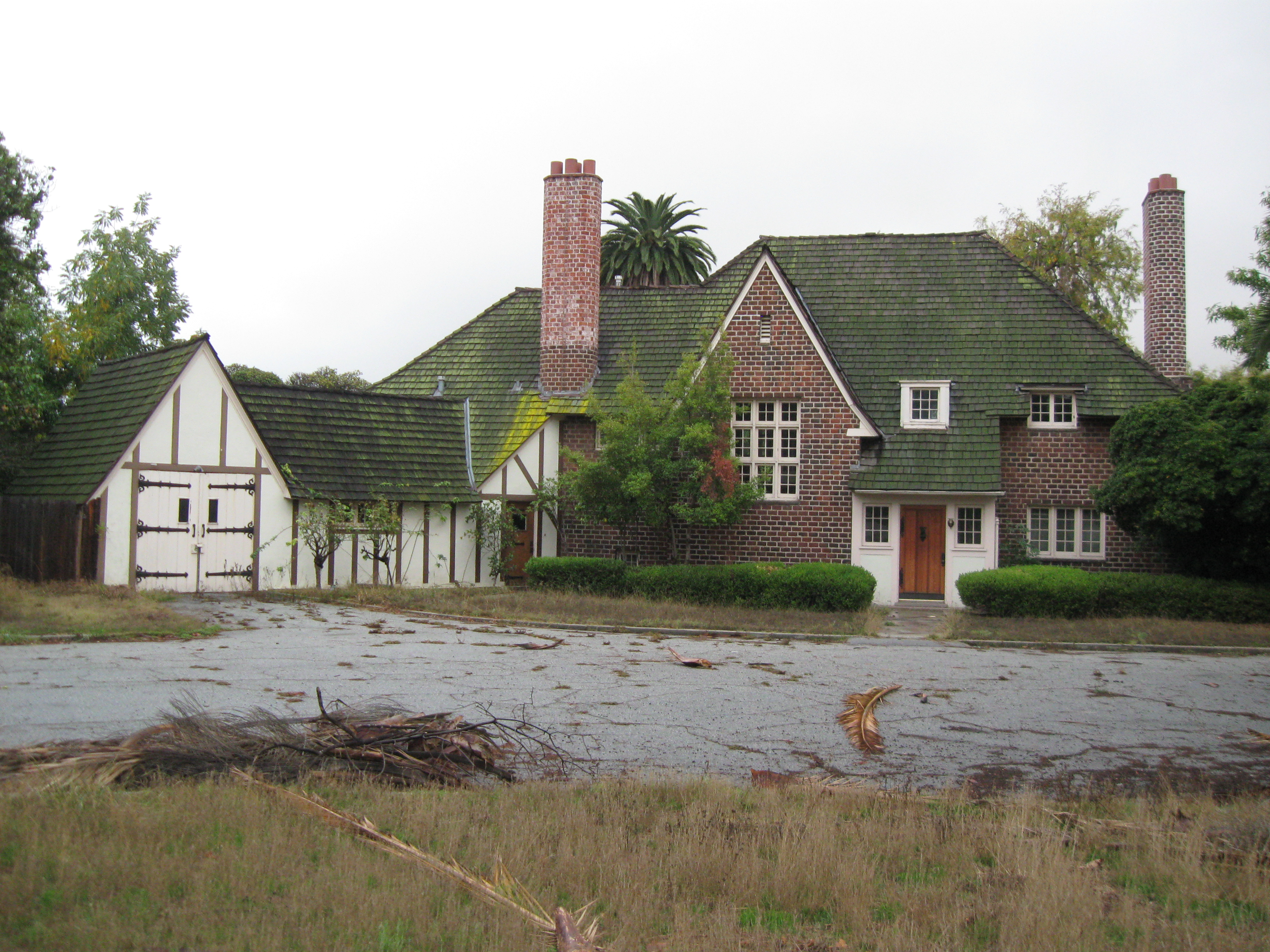
A private residence

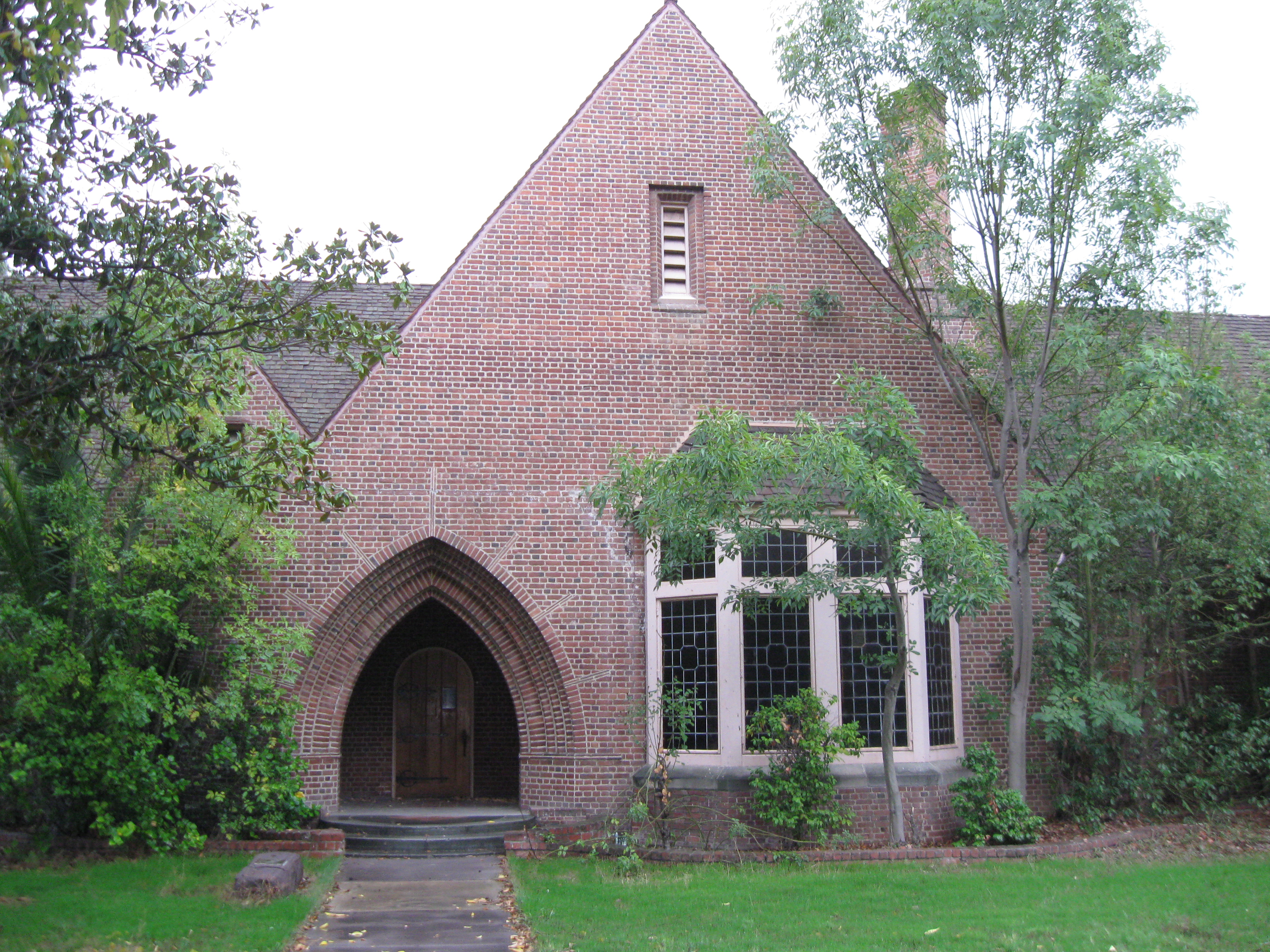
One of several older buildings

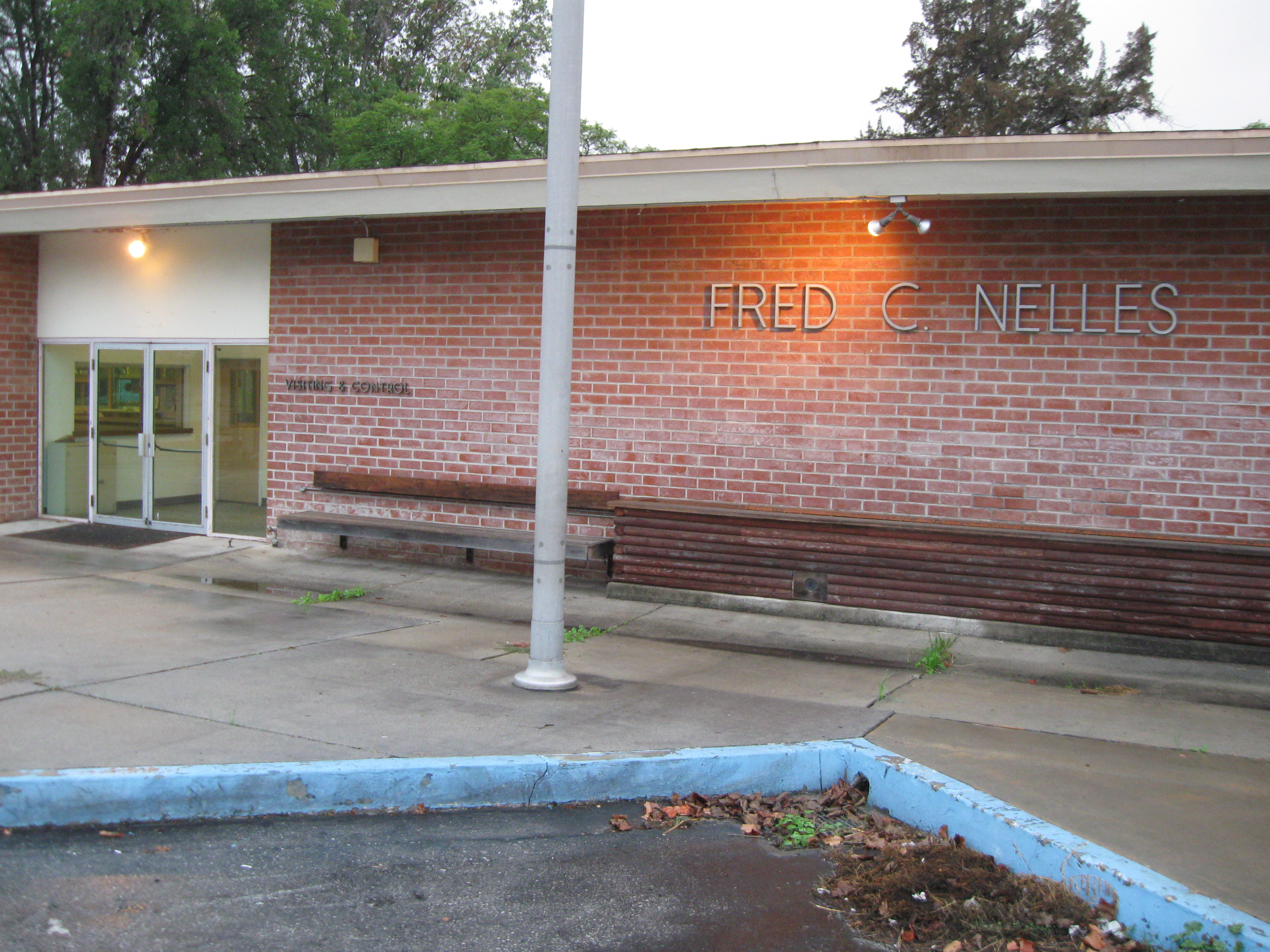
Entrance where persons are searched and controlled when entering or leaving facility
