= Vicente Saldivar =

Mexican boxer

Vicente Saldiver
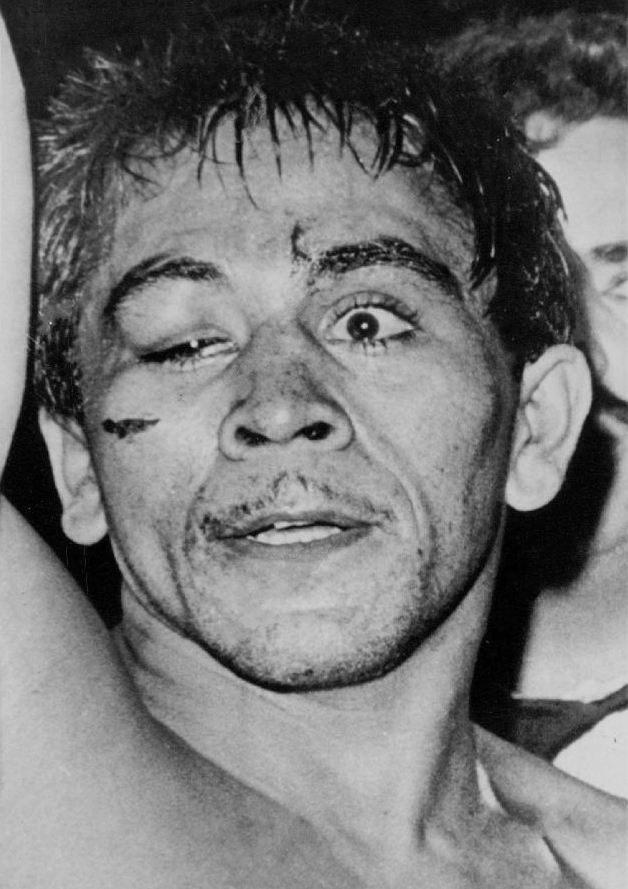
- Saldivar after the bout with Raul Rojas in 1965

Personal information
- Nicknames: El Zurdo de Oro (The Golden Southpaw)
- Born: Vicente Samuel Saldivar García; May 3, 1943 Mexico City, Mexico
- Died: July 18, 1985 (aged 42) Mexico City, Mexico
- Height: 5 ft 3 in (160 cm)
- Weight: Featherweight

Boxing career
- Reach: 66 1/2 in (169 cm)
- Stance: Southpaw

Boxing record
- Total fights: 40
- Wins: 37
- Win by KO: 26
- Losses: 3

Vicente Samuel Saldívar García (May 3, 1943 – July 18, 1985) was a Mexican professional boxer who competed between 1961 and 1973. He was a two-time featherweight champion, having held the WBA, WBC, and The Ring titles from 1964 until his retirement in 1967. He came back and once again held the WBC and The Ring titles in 1970. Saldivar has frequently been ranked amongst the greatest in the history of that division by many noted boxing historians and critics. He currently holds the record for the most wins in unified featherweight title bouts and the longest unified featherweight championship reign in boxing history at 8 title bouts and 7 title defenses respectively. Saldívar fought in front of the fourth largest crowd ever, 90,000 in Estadio Azteca, and has also regularly been cited as one of the finest left-handed fighters of all time.

== Childhood ==
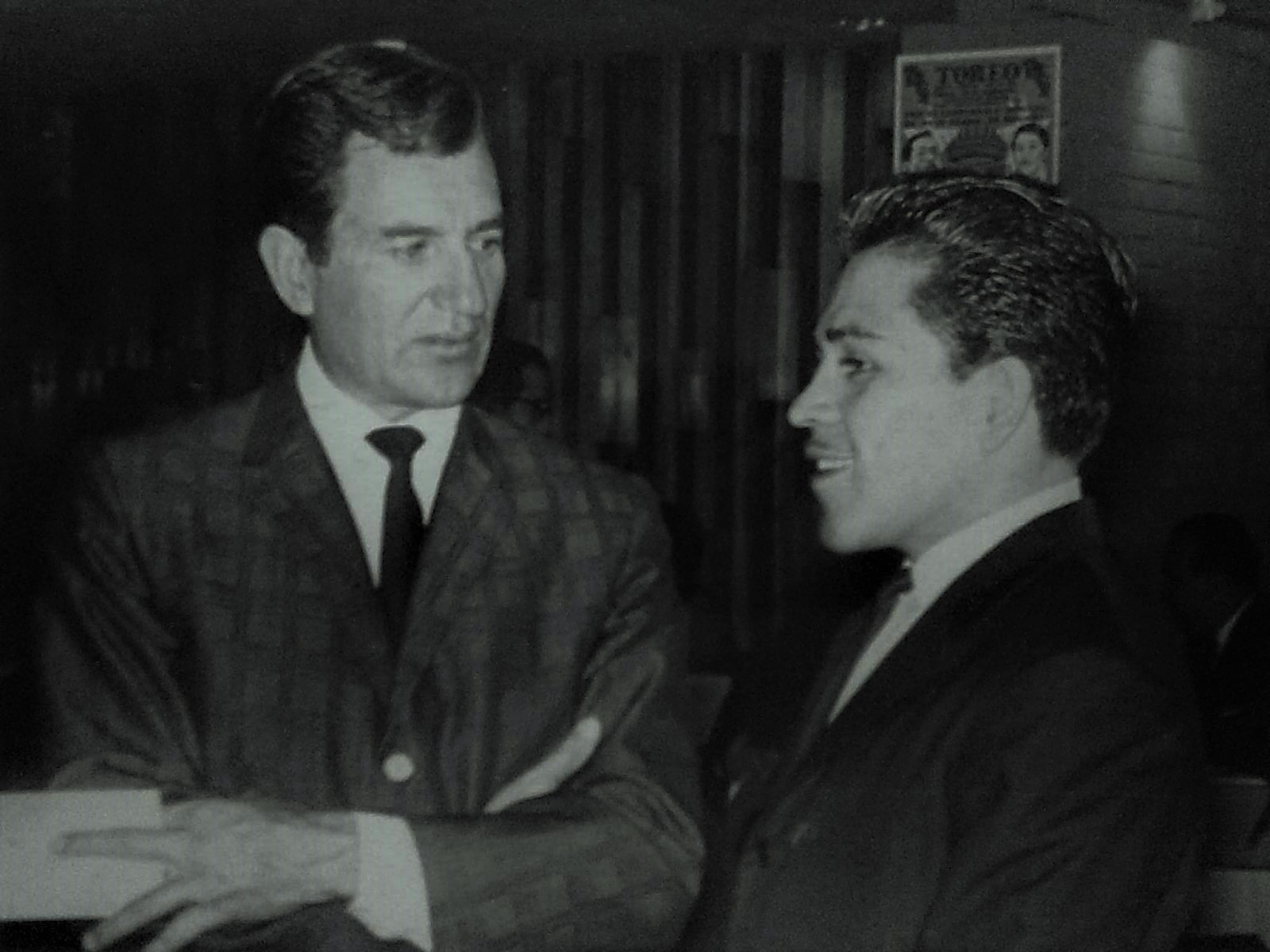
entrevista a vicente zaldivar 1964

Saldívar was born in one of the many poor quarters of Mexico City and is one of seven children. He used to get in fights on the streets and in school, so his father decided to channel the misguided energy into boxing. Like many other Mexicans his father was a big boxing fan, so it was a logical move. He was taught by Jose Moreno, a veteran trainer of a nearby Mexico City boxing gym.

== Fighting style ==
As a southpaw, Saldívar was a dynamic fighter in the ring. He could box or brawl, and often softened opponents with a brutal body attack. Among his greatest assets was his stamina; he scored seven knockouts after the 7th round. Saldívar had an unusually slow heart and pulse rate, which he claimed was the secret of the phenomenal pace he was able to maintain in the ring.

== Amateur career ==
Saldívar had a successful amateur career, crowned with a Mexican Golden Gloves title at bantamweight. At seventeen years old, he was included into the 1960 Olympic team, but was eliminated in the first bout of the Rome tournament by Ernst Chervet of Switzerland.

== Professional career ==
Saldívar turned professional in 1961 and won the Mexican featherweight title with a second-round knockout of Juan Ramírez on February 8, 1964. His first major victory came on June 1 of that same year when he defeated future lightweight champion and hall of fame member Ismael Laguna. Before challenging for a world title, he accumulated a record of 25–1, with his sole loss avenged by knockout.

=== WBC and WBA Featherweight Championships ===
On September 26, 1964, Saldívar won the WBA and WBC Featherweight titles by upsetting fellow Mexican fighter and future hall of famer Sugar Ramos with an 11th-round knockout in an extremely bloody battle. His first reign as champion would last three years, in which Saldívar made eight successful title defenses. The reign was highlighted by his trilogy with Howard Winstone.

In his first title defense, he defeated future champion Raul Rojas. On September 7, 1965, he defeated Winstone in their first meeting with a 15-round decision . Following that victory, he defeated Floyd Robertson by second round knock out. He then defeated Mitsunori Seki in two consecutive bouts. On June 15, 1967, Saldívar defeated Winston once again by a 15-round decision. In 1996, Ring magazine included their second meeting on their list of the 100 greatest title fights of all-time. In the final installment of their trilogy, he defeated Winston by 12th round knock out. Saldivar announced his retirement after that contest in October 1967. Three months later, Winstone won recognition as WBC featherweight champion, claiming the belt left vacant by Saldivar, by defeating Mitsunori Seki with a 9th-round stoppage due to a cut right eye.

=== Return to the ring ===
After 21 months of inactivity, Saldívar returned to the ring on July 18, 1969, and won a 10-round unanimous decision over another former as well as future Featherweight champion, José Legra. Then on May 9, 1970, he regained the featherweight title with a 15-round unanimous decision over Johnny Famechon. This reign, however, was short-lived. Saldívar lost the crown seven months later in his first defense against Kuniaki Shibata.

=== Retirement and comeback ===
He would fight once more before retiring again in 1971, however, the lure of the ring was too strong. He returned at the age of 30 after 2 years and 3 months of inactivity for another title attempt on October 21, 1973. His opponent was fellow Hall of Famer and former bantamweight champion Éder Jofre. Jofre, who was 37, had won the Featherweight crown after coming out of his own retirement (albeit a brief 7 month one). Saldívar's skills had greatly diminished and Jofre won the contest with a fourth-round knockout in Brazil. After the fight, Saldívar retired for good.

== Professional boxing record ==
40 fights	37 wins	3 losses
By knockout	26	3
By decision	10	0
By disqualification	1	0

No.	Result	Record	Opponent	Type	Round, time	Date	Location	Notes
40	Loss	37–3	Éder Jofre	KO	4 (15)	Oct 21, 1973	Ginásio de Esportes, Salvador, Bahia, Brazil	For WBC featherweight title
39	Win	37–2	Frankie Crawford	UD	10	Jul 15, 1971	Olympic Auditorium, Los Angeles, California, U.S.	
38	Loss	36–2	Kuniaki Shibata	RTD	12 (15)	Dec 11, 1970	Auditorio Municipal, Tijuana, Baja California, Mexico	Lost WBC and The Ring featherweight titles
37	Win	36–1	Johnny Famechon	UD	15	May 9, 1970	PalaEur, Rome, Lazio, Italy	Won WBC and The Ring featherweight titles
36	Win	35–1	José Legrá	UD	10	Jul 18, 1969	The Forum, Inglewood, California, U.S.	
35	Win	34–1	Howard Winstone	TKO	12 (15)	Oct 14, 1967	Estadio Azteca, Mexico City, Mexico	Retained WBA, WBC, and The Ring featherweight titles
34	Win	33–1	Howard Winstone	PTS	15	Jun 15, 1967	Ninian Park, Cardiff, Wales, U.K.	Retained WBA, WBC, and The Ring featherweight titles
33	Win	32–1	Mitsunori Seki	TKO	7 (15)	Jan 29, 1967	Toreo de Cuatro Caminos, Mexico City, Mexico	Retained WBA, WBC, and The Ring featherweight titles
32	Win	31–1	Mitsunori Seki	UD	15	Aug 7, 1966	Toreo de Cuatro Caminos, Mexico City, Mexico	Retained WBA, WBC, and The Ring featherweight titles
31	Win	30–1	Floyd Robertson	KO	2 (15)	Feb 12, 1966	Plaza de Toros México, Mexico City, Mexico	Retained WBA, WBC, and The Ring featherweight titles
30	Win	29–1	Howard Winstone	PTS	15	Sep 7, 1965	Earls Court Arena, London, England, U.K.	Retained WBA, WBC, and The Ring featherweight titles
29	Win	28–1	Raul Rojas	TKO	15 (15)	May 7, 1965	Memorial Coliseum, Los Angeles, California, U.S.	Retained WBA, WBC, and The Ring featherweight titles
28	Win	27–1	Delfino Rosales	TKO	11 (12)	Dec 6, 1964	Plaza de Toros La Luz, León, Guanajuato, Mexico	Retained Mexican featherweight title
27	Win	26–1	Sugar Ramos	RTD	12 (15)	Sep 26, 1964	Toreo de Cuatro Caminos, Mexico City, Mexico	Won WBA, WBC, and The Ring featherweight titles
26	Win	25–1	Ismael Laguna	UD	10	Jun 1, 1964	Plaza de Toros, Tijuana, Baja California, Mexico	
25	Win	24–1	Eduardo Guerrero	UD	12	Apr 4, 1964	Arena México, Mexico City, Mexico	Retained Mexican featherweight title
24	Win	23–1	Juan Ramírez	TKO	2 (12)	Feb 8, 1964	Arena México, Mexico City, Mexico	Won Mexican featherweight title
23	Win	22–1	Félix Gutiérrez	TKO	3 (10)	Dec 16, 1963	Cuernavaca, Morelos, Mexico	
22	Win	21–1	Beresford Francis	TKO	2 (10)	Sep 21, 1963	Arena México, Mexico City, Mexico	
21	Win	20–1	Eloy Sánchez	KO	1 (10)	Jul 13, 1963	Arena México, Mexico City, Mexico	
20	Win	19–1	Baby Luis	TKO	8 (10)	Jun 15, 1963	Mexico City, Mexico	
19	Win	18–1	Dwight Hawkins	KO	5 (10)	Apr 19, 1963	Monterrey, Nuevo León, Mexico	
18	Win	17–1	Luis Hernández	KO	2 (10)	Mar 16, 1963	Los Mochis, Sinaloa, Mexico	
17	Loss	16–1	Baby Luis	TKO	7 (10)	Dec 29, 1962	Toreo de Cuatro Caminos, Mexico City, Mexico	
16	Win	16–0	Jorge Salazar	KO	5 (10)	Dec 16, 1962	Matamoros, Tamaulipas, Mexico	
15	Win	15–0	José López	PTS	10	Nov 17, 1962	Monterrey, Nuevo León, Mexico	
14	Win	14–0	Luis Hernández	KO	1 (10)	Oct 11, 1962	Los Mochis, Sinaloa, Mexico	
13	Win	13–0	Alberto Soto	TKO	2 (10)	Aug 22, 1962	Arena Coliseo, Mexico City, Mexico	
12	Win	12–0	Indio Fernández	TKO	6 (10)	Jun 27, 1962	Mexico City, Mexico	
11	Win	11–0	Genaro González	DQ	8 (10)	May 2, 1962	Mexico City, Mexico	
10	Win	10–0	Jorge Salazar	KO	4 (10)	Apr 4, 1962	Matamoros, Tamaulipas, Mexico	
9	Win	9–0	Juan Zavala	KO	10 (10)	Mar 18, 1962	Tuxtla Gutiérrez, Chiapas, Mexico	
8	Win	8–0	Rosendo Martínez	TKO	5 (10)	Feb 8, 1962	Huauchinango, Puebla, Mexico	
7	Win	7–0	Ernesto Beltrán	KO	6 (10)	Jan 6, 1962	Acapulco, Guerrero, Mexico	
6	Win	6–0	Juan Rodríguez	TKO	6 (10)	Dec 3, 1961	León, Guanajuato, Mexico	
5	Win	5–0	José Luis Mora	PTS	10	Oct 14, 1961	Huauchinango, Puebla, Mexico	
4	Win	4–0	Babe López	KO	3 (8)	May 20, 1961	León, Guanajuato, Mexico	
3	Win	3–0	Eduardo Meza	KO	3 (8)	Apr 16, 1961	Oaxaca City, Oaxaca, Mexico	
2	Win	2–0	Frijol González	KO	4 (6)	Mar 22, 1961	Oaxaca City, Oaxaca, Mexico	
1	Win	1–0	Baby Palacios	KO	1 (6)	Feb 18, 1961	Oaxaca City, Oaxaca, Mexico	

== Titles in boxing ==
=== Major world titles ===
- WBA featherweight champion (126 lbs)
- WBC featherweight champion (126 lbs) (2×)

=== The Ring magazine titles ===
- The Ring featherweight champion (126 lbs) (2×)

=== Regional/International titles ===
- Mexican featherweight champion (126 lbs)

=== Undisputed titles ===
- Undisputed featherweight champion

== Death ==
He died of cancer on July 18, 1985, aged only 42. In 1999 he was inducted into the International Boxing Hall of Fame.

== See also ==
- List of southpaw stance boxers
- List of Mexican boxing world champions
- List of world featherweight boxing champions

Sporting positions
Regional boxing titles
Preceded by Juan Ramirez	Mexican featherweight champion February 8, 1964 – 1965; Vacated	Vacant Title next held by Mario Díaz
World boxing titles
Preceded by Sugar Ramos	WBA featherweight champion September 26, 1964 – October 14, 1967; Retired	Vacant Title next held by Raul Rojas
Preceded by Sugar Ramos	WBC featherweight champion September 26, 1964 – October 14, 1967; Retired	Vacant Title next held by Howard Winstone
Preceded by Sugar Ramos	The Ring featherweight champion September 26, 1964 – October 14, 1967; Retired	Vacant Title next held by Johnny Famechon
Preceded by Sugar Ramos	Undisputed featherweight champion September 26, 1964 – October 14, 1967; Retired	Vacant
Vacant Title last held by Johnny Famechon	WBC featherweight champion May 9, 1970 – December 11, 1970	Vacant Title next held by Kuniaki Shibata
Vacant Title last held by Johnny Famechon	The Ring featherweight champion May 9, 1970 – December 11, 1970	Vacant Title next held by Kuniaki Shibata
