= Los Angeles County Probation Department =

Probation Department in Los Angeles County, California

Department overview
- Formed: 1903
- Jurisdiction: Los Angeles County
- Headquarters: 9150 East Imperial Highway; Downey, California 90242–9986; 33.916343°N 118.132190°W
- Employees: 6,136 (2010)
- Annual budget: US$692,808,000 (2010)
- Department executive: Guillermo Viera Rosa, Chief Probation Officer
- Website: probation.lacounty.gov

The Los Angeles County Probation Department provides services for those placed on probation within Los Angeles County, California. Guillermo Viera Rosa is the current chief probation officer. The department is the largest probation department in the world.

== History ==
The department was established in 1903 with the enactment of California's first probation laws. Captain Augustus C. Dodds was appointed as first chief probation officer of Los Angeles County. The first juvenile detention facility, now known as Central Juvenile Hall, was established on Eastlake Avenue in the city of Los Angeles in 1912. Also in 1912, the new Los Angeles County Charter made the county probation officer a county administrative officer and brought all department employees under the merit system. The El Retiro School for Girls was established in Sylmar in 1919. By 1920, the department had 27 deputy probation officers, handling 1,893 juvenile court petitions and 690 adult cases each month. In 1921, W.H. Holland was named chief probation officer. In 1928, the department opened its first branch office, in Long Beach.

In 1931, Kenyon J. Scudder was appointed chief probation officer. The department began its forestry camp program and established the first Community Coordination Council, initiatives which later were models for the California Conservation Corps and other programs. In 1935, the department opened its second branch area office, in Pasadena. In 1938, probation services were extended to Los Angeles Municipal Courts. In 1939, Karl Holton was appointed chief probation officer; he left in 1943 to assume the position of first director of the newly created California Youth Authority; John M. Zuck was appointed to replace him.

By 1940, the department has 108 staff members handling 4,063 juvenile and 5,299 adult probation cases. The 1940s saw the creation of the group's guidance program to work with juvenile gangs. In 1946, a year-long deputy probation officer trainee program was established.

In 1952, Karl Holton returned to the department as chief probation officer and "instituted full-scale reorganization and decentralization of the department," with numerous area offices opening countywide. In 1954, Harold R. Muntz was appointed new chief deputy probation officer. Los Padrinos, the second juvenile hall, opened in 1957, and responsibility for juvenile halls was officially transferred to the probation department from the old probation committee.

In 1960, the department had grown to have 2,200 staff members and reorganized itself into four divisions: field services, juvenile facilities, administrative services, and a medical division. Five hundred field services deputy probation officers "investigated 25,000 adult and 16,500 juvenile cases each year and supervised 24,500 adult and 15,000 juvenile probationers from 11 area offices," and an additional hundred deputies "worked with almost 1,000 boys in 10 camps."

In 1961, the California State Legislature adopted juvenile court reform laws, following recommendations from the governor's commission, in the first major reform since 1903. In 1962, the department's headquarters moved to the new Los Angeles County Hall of Records at Civic Center, and Leland C. Carter was appointed chief probation officer.

In 1965, the department opened the San Fernando Valley Juvenile Hall in the San Fernando Valley in the county's northeast, relieving overcrowding elsewhere. That year, there were more than 3,300 employees in thirteen area offices, four specialized offices, fourteen camps and schools, and four juvenile detention facilities. Longtime Probation Department employee Kenneth E. Kirkpatric was appointed chief probation officer in 1968.

== SYTF Campuses, Juvenile Halls and Camps ==
Probation department personnel oversee the following two juvenile halls, seventeen juvenile camps, and two SYTF campuses:

SYTF (Secure Youth Treatment Facility)

- Barry J. Nidorf Juvenile Hall, Sylmar
- Camp Vernon Kilpatrick, Malibu

Juvenile halls:

- Central Juvenile Hall (Eastlake), Los Angeles
- Los Padrinos Juvenile Hall, Downey

Juvenile camps:

- Camp Afflerbaugh-Paige, La Verne
  - Consists of Camp Clinton B. Afflerbaugh and Camp Joseph M. Paige
- Camp David Gonzales, Calabasas (Closed)
- Camp Karl Holton, Sylmar (rented out to State of California; inmates are housed in Camp Smith) (Closed)
- Camp Vernon Kilpatrick, Malibu
- Camp William Mendenhall, Lake Hughes (Closed)
- Camp Fred Miller, Malibu (Closed)
- Camp John Munz, Lake Hughes (Closed)
- Camp Glenn Rockey, San Dimas
- Camp Louis Routh, Tujunga (Closed)
- Camp Joseph Scott, Santa Clarita (female inmates) (notable for also housing a charter school to educate its inmates)
- Camp Kenyon Scudder, Santa Clarita (female inmates with mental health issues)
- Challenger Memorial Youth Center, Lancaster
  - Facility including six juvenile camps: Camp Michael Smith, Camp Francis J. Scobee, Camp Judith Resnik, Camp Ellison Onizuka, Camp Gregory Jarvis, Camp Ronald McNair (Closed)
- Dorothy F. Kirby Center, Los Angeles (mental health facility for male and females)
