= Karl Holton =

American youth probation administrator (1898-1978)

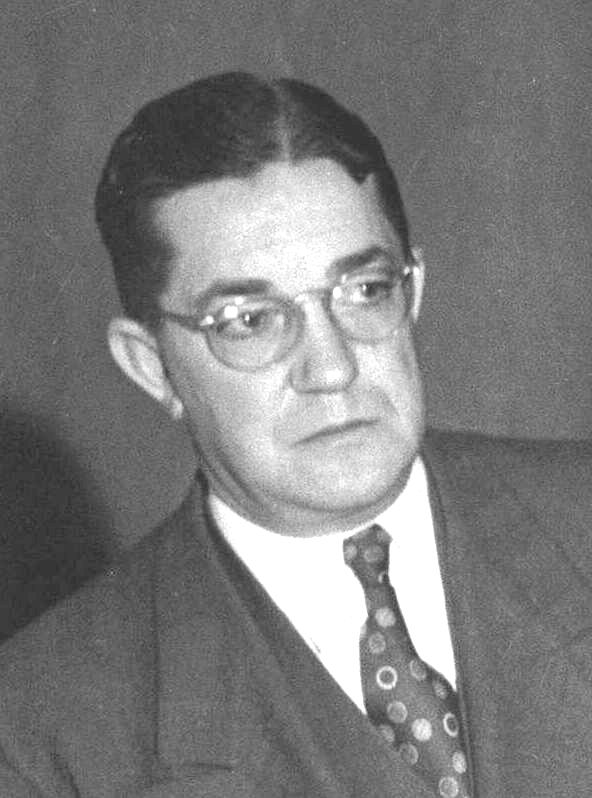
Holton in 1943.

Karl Holton (April 10, 1898 — January 9, 1978) worked at the Los Angeles County Probation Department from the late 1920s to early 1960s. During his career, Holton became the head of the county's probation department in 1938 before moving to the California Youth Authority in 1943. From 1943 to 1952, Holton served as the Youth Authority's director before he returned to Los Angeles County in 1952. With the Probation Department, Holton continued his head probation officer position until his 1963 retirement. The year he retired, Holton received the Presidential Medal of Freedom.

== Biography ==
On April 10, 1898, Holton was born in Blaine, Kentucky. Holton started his post-secondary education at the University of Washington and received a Bachelor of Science in 1923. For his graduate studies, Holton attended multiple social sciences programs in Californian universities during the 1920s.

After university, Holton joined the Los Angeles County Probation Department in 1928 as a probation officer. With Los Angeles County, Holton held multiple positions before being named head of the county's probation department in 1938. Holton remained in his executive role until he was selected to lead the California Youth Authority in 1943. At the youth authority, Holton conducted research on Californian correctional facilities and co-structured the crime prevention department of the United States Children's Bureau.

In 1952, Holton left the youth authority to resume his probation department lead position for Los Angeles County. Outside of California, Holton examined Washington's correctional services for juveniles in 1957. He was later asked by Nelson Rockefeller to talk about New York's youth crime prevention plan in 1959. Holton remained in his executive role until his 1963 retirement and received the Presidential Medal of Freedom the same year. In his personal life, Holton had one child before he died on January 9, 1978, in Newport Beach, California.
