= Camp Joseph Scott =

Juvenile detention camp in Los Angeles County. California

Coordinates: 34.457465°N 118.485886°W

Camp Joseph Scott is one of the 18 juvenile camps in Los Angeles County. The camp is located in Santa Clarita, California in the Santa Clarita Valley of Los Angeles County. It neighbors Camp Kenyon Scudder. Camp Scott is a camp for female inmates with a charter school education system supervised by the Los Angeles Unified School District.

The charter system was voted by Los Angeles education supervisors in 2008, when Camp Scott had about 100 female inmates. Camp Joseph Scott was the first facility in the county camp system to establish a charter school education.
