= David Petersen (sculptor) =

Welsh sculptor (born 1944)

David Petersen (born 1944) is a Welsh sculptor, cultural commentator and television presenter based in St. Clears, Carmarthenshire. He is particularly known for his metal sculptures of dragons.

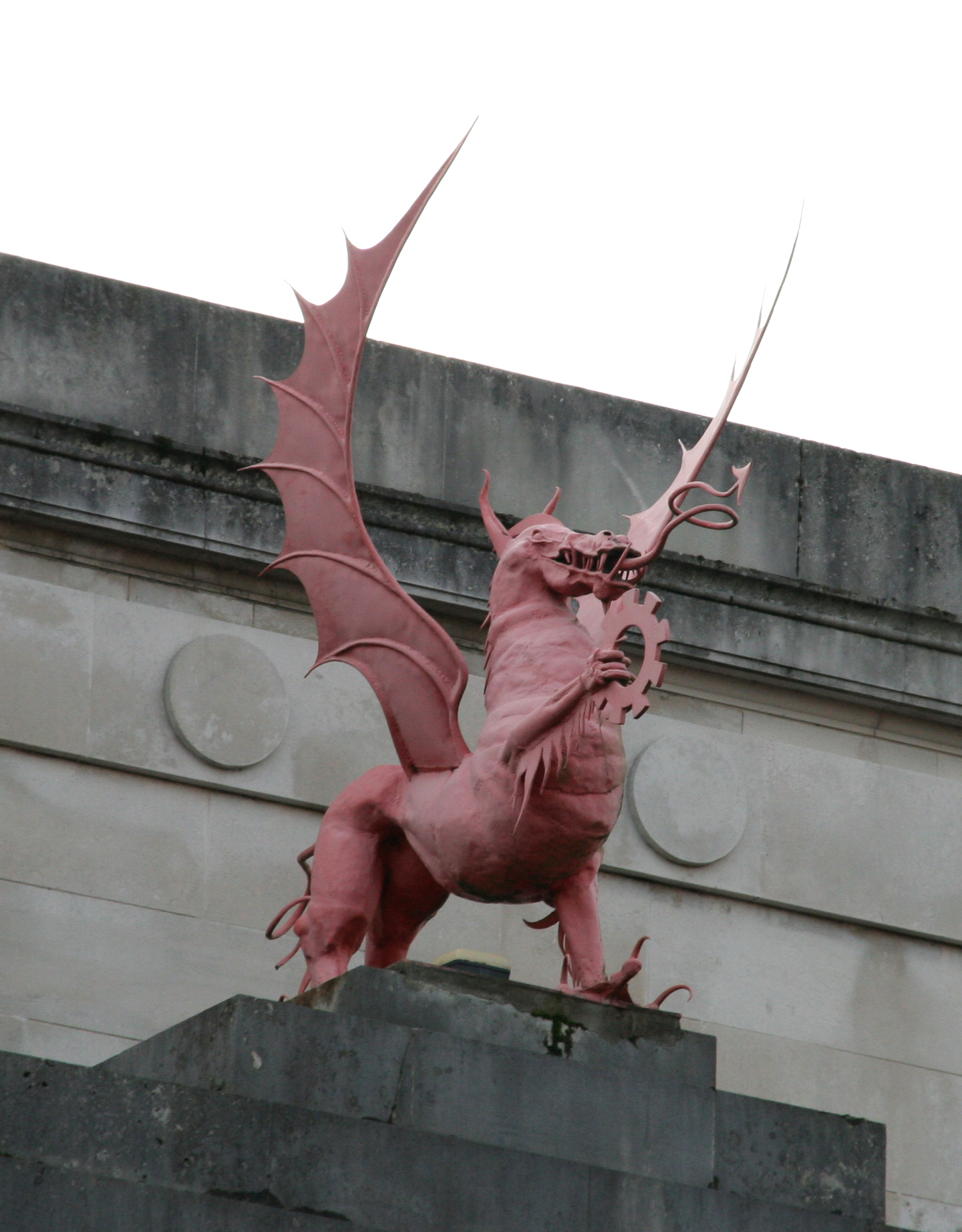
Red Dragon, Cardiff University (1984)

Petersen was born in Cardiff in 1944, the son of Jack Petersen (1911–1990), a boxer who held the British Heavyweight title on two occasions.

Petersen worked in the GKN steelworks in Cardiff before studying fine art at Newport College of Art (1961–1965). He is an elected member of the Royal Cambrian Academy, and has served as chairman of the British Artist Blacksmiths Association.

For several years Petersen led the Welsh delegation to the Festival Interceltique de Lorient in Brittany. He resigned from the festival committee in 2008 in protest at the content of the Welsh pavilion.

Petersen's sons Aaron, Toby and Gideon are sculptors who sometimes work collaboratively with their father.

== Major works ==
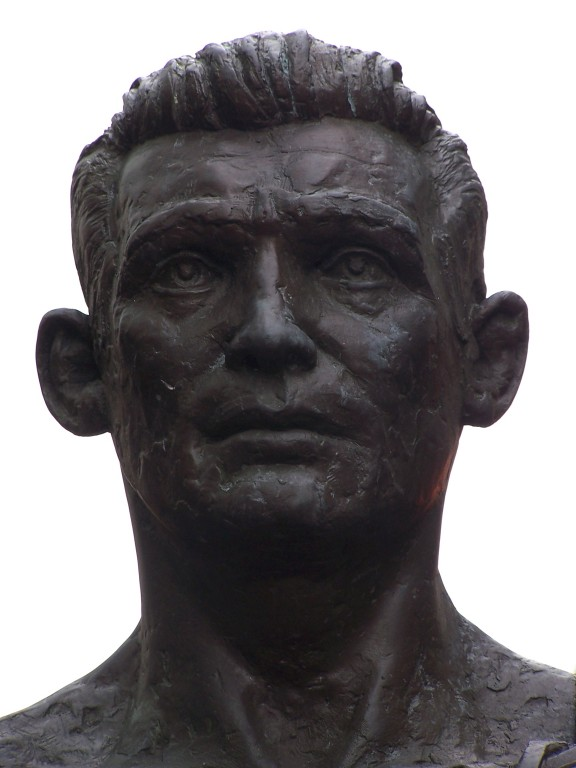
Statue of Howard Winstone, 2001 (detail)

=== Mametz Wood Memorial (1987) ===
The Mametz Wood memorial commemorates an action of the 38th (Welsh) Division of the British Army during the First Battle of the Somme in 1916. The memorial, located on the site of the action in northern France, is of a large red dragon holding barbed wire, mounted on a stone plinth.

=== Coal, Steel and Water (1989) ===
A steel sculpture mounted on polished granite located in the foyer of County Hall, Cardiff. Commissioned by Allied Steel and Wire as a gift to South Glamorgan County Council.

=== National Millennium Beacon (1999) ===
Together with his sons, Petersen won a competition to make the National Millennium Beacon for the millennium celebrations. The large stainless steel sculpture was erected on the porch of Cardiff City Hall.

=== Postage stamp (1999) ===
Petersen designed the definitive issue of the Welsh second class postage stamp, which features a leek carved from wood. Petersen's sons Toby and Gideon designed the first class stamp which features a dragon.

=== Howard Winstone (2001) ===
A bronze statue of the world champion boxer Howard Winstone (1939–2000), located in a shopping centre in Merthyr Tydfil.

== Television ==
Petersen is also known as a television presenter on historical and cultural topics. His work includes Stop, Look, Listen: Tales from Wales (Channel 4, 2002) and When the Romans Came to Wales (Channel 4, 2003).

== Political activity ==
Petersen was a Plaid Cymru candidate in the 1999 National Assembly election for the Brecon and Radnorshire constituency. He gained 2,356 votes, 8.1% of the overall vote.
