= Raul Rojas =

American boxer

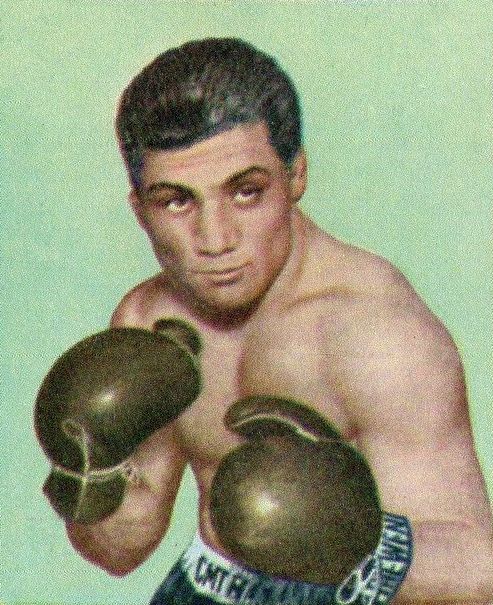
- Rojas c. 1968

Personal information
- Born: November 5, 1941 San Pablo, California, United States
- Died: May 20, 2012 (aged 70) Los Angeles, California, United States
- Height: 1.63 m (5 ft 4 in)
- Weight: Featherweight

Boxing career
- Reach: 1.57 m (5 ft 2 in)
- Stance: Orthodox

Boxing record
- Total fights: 47
- Wins: 38
- Win by KO: 24
- Losses: 7
- Draws: 2

Raul Rojas (November 5, 1941 – May 20, 2012) was an American featherweight boxer. He accumulated a record of 38 wins (24 by KO), 7 losses and 2 draws. On March 28, 1968, Rojas defeated Enrique Higgins to win the WBA Featherweight Title, which Vicente Saldivar had vacated after announcing his retirement. He lost the title on September 27, 1968 to Shozo Saijo. Rojas was inducted into the California Boxing Hall of Fame.

Rojas who was of Mexican descent grew up as a gangster, leading the group "Little Roy's Gang". Two of his brothers were sent to San Quentin State Prison, while Rojas spent time at the California Division of Juvenile Justice. He once said that "If it were not for boxing, I'd probably either be in San Quentin or would already have made the trip to the gas chamber." He died of natural causes at the age of 70. He was survived by daughters Rebecca and Guadalupe.

Achievements
Vacant Title last held by Vicente Saldivar	WBA Featherweight Champion; March 28, 1968 – September 27, 1968	Succeeded by Shozo Saijo
