= California Division of Juvenile Justice =

Law enforcement agency in California, US

Agency overview
- Formed: 1941; 85 years ago
- Preceding agency: California Youth Authority (1943–2004); Youth Corrections Authority (1941-1943)
- Dissolved: 2023; 3 years ago

Jurisdictional structure
- Operations jurisdiction: California, USA
- Map of California Division of Juvenile Justice's jurisdiction
- Area: 163,696 square miles (423,970 km^{2})
- Population: 39,536,653 (2017 est.)
- Legal jurisdiction: As per operations jurisdiction

Operational structure
- Headquarters: Sacramento, California
- Parent agency: California Department of Corrections and Rehabilitation (2005–present); Youth and Adult Correctional Agency (1980–2004); Human Relations/Health and Welfare Agency (1969-1979); Youth and Adult Corrections Agency (1961-1968)

Website
- www.cdcr.ca.gov/juvenile-justice/

The California Division of Juvenile Justice (DJJ), previously known as the California Youth Authority (CYA), was a division of the California Department of Corrections and Rehabilitation that provided education, training, and treatment services for California's most serious youth offenders, until its closure in 2023. These youths were committed by the juvenile and criminal courts to DJJ's eleven correctional facilities, four conservation camps and two residential drug treatment programs. The DJJ provided services to juvenile offenders, ranging in age from twelve to 25, in facilities and on parole, and worked closely with law enforcement, the courts, district attorneys, public defenders, probation offices and other public and private agencies involved with the problems of youth. At its peak, the DJJ was housing 10,000 youth within 11 facilities and numerous fire camps. The DJJ underwent reorganization as required by a court agreement and the California State Legislature after widespread criticisms of conditions at its youth prisons. The agency's headquarters were in Sacramento, California.

== Mission and Vision ==
The DJJ's stated mission is:

- "To provide opportunities for growth and change by identifying and responding to the unique needs of our youth. We do this through effective treatment, education and interventions in order to encourage positive lifestyles, reduce recidivism, strengthen families and protect our communities."

== Education ==
The DJJ was legally required to provide a high school education for every ward who does not already have a diploma. However, students are sometimes kept from class because of safety and security situations or teacher vacancies. Validated gang associates are sometimes kept from classroom or vocational training for institutional safety and security reasons relative to gang tensions or conflict. Academic teachers and vocational instructors are credentialed through the California Commission on Teacher Credentialing. The education area of the institution is referred to as the "Education Corridor" or "Trade Line", reflecting the vocational training focus of the institution. The Trade Line is monitored by security professionals known as "Youth Correctional Officers" (YCO). Students are escorted to the Trade Line from their living areas by "Youth Correctional Counselors" (YCC). The educational system in the DJJ is part of the California Department of Education, and each site is required to maintain accreditation through the Western Association of Schools and Colleges.

== Conditions ==
On non-school days, maximum security inmates were locked in their cells for 23 hours a day. A spokesman for Governor Arnold Schwarzenegger's prisons department said lengthy lockdowns at DJJ facilities were no longer used as punishment, but were sometimes necessary to maintain order. One of the justifications for such treatment is gang affiliation and the threat of corresponding violence.

Many of the Youthful Offenders at some DJJ facilities arrived on or are placed on psychotropic medications, a matter that has triggered protests and litigation.

The threat of violence was a constant distraction at DJJ facilities. In 2004, a six-month investigation by the San Jose Mercury News uncovered deep systemic flaws, concluding that violence was predominant, gangs ruled, and fear was pervasive. The Mercury News reported that, at any given time, dozens of young men are held in isolation cells for fighting or other offenses at the state's two maximum security facilities, and that wards sometimes threw human waste, blood or semen through the slots in their cell doors.

Experts who have studied the prisons have declared them the most violent in the nation, and there have been six suicides in California's juvenile jails between 2000 and 2005.

In January 2005, Chief Deputy Inspector General Brett Morgan issued a report calling for the elimination of 23-hour-a-day incarceration policies for wards placed in administrative segregation and criticized the DJJ for failing to end the practice. The inspector general's report outlines Maldonado's history and offers a portrait of Chaderjian as a violent lockup where gang leaders seem to have more clout than the Youth Correctional Officers.

== Litigation ==
Beginning in 2000, CYA was featured regularly in news headlines across the state. Local and national media reported rampant violence, staff-on-ward beatings, canine attacks, multiple suicides, extended 23-hour lockdowns, and children attending classes while confined in cages. That year, a Sacramento federal judge rejected a class action suit on behalf of all CYA inmates, declaring they had failed to back up claims forming the basis of their bid for sweeping revisions of CYA policies and procedures.

The judge did allow three defined groups of wards to sue in three specific categories of contention on constitutional grounds. Wards forcibly medicated with a psychotropic drug without a hearing were enabled to challenge CYA's forced drugging policy. Wards committed for sexual offenses were allowed to challenge sex offender treatment programs in which they were placed. Wards placed in isolation for their own safety without a hearing were also allowed to proceed with litigation.

In a separate lawsuit, the Prison Law Office complained that "Rehabilitation cannot succeed when the classroom is a cage and wards live in constant fear of physical and sexual violence from CYA staff and other wards." In January 2002, a federal conditions lawsuit was filed against CYA by a coalition including the Prison Law Office. The suit was refiled In January 2003, as Farrell v. Harper (later renamed Farrell v. Hickman. The parties agreed to jointly select national experts to determine the nature and extent of the CYA's problems. By 2004, Governor Schwarzenegger had settled that lawsuit and pledged to make significant changes, but his administration has missed several court-imposed deadlines to implement reforms, including policies regarding suicide prevention, according to Specter. A special master was appointed to oversee reform implementation.

In 2001, another lawsuit against CYA prompted a San Francisco judge to direct the CYA to obtain licenses for all eleven of its health care facilities within two years.

DJJ previously housed over 6,000 youths; now with court-ordered reforms, numbers are down by two-thirds. Plaintiff's attorneys who document these changes also note many changes in the conditions of confinement, health services, etc.

Its predecessor, CYA, had a $387 million annual budget as of 2004. Each year, well over 2,000 young offenders are admitted to DJJ, while a similar number are released. Most wards are committed for violent crimes, and are institutionalized for over two years on average, at a cost to the state of over $71,000 per inmate each year, an increase of over 130%, from $30,783 in 1990. In recent years, California's juvenile justice system has received intense and increasing criticism from experts nationwide for running draconian youth prisons.

== Stockton: N.A. Chaderjian Youth Correctional Facility ==
The N.A. Chaderjian Youth Correctional Facility in Stockton is one of the CYA's two maximum security lockups and holds those aged 18–24, and was described as the home for the worst-of-the-worst juvenile offenders. Chaderjian, also known as "Chad", earned national headlines in 2004 "when guards were captured on film kicking and punching wards."

In August 2005, 18-year-old Joseph Daniel Maldonado hanged himself at Chaderjian, sparking yet another round of outcries about conditions and calls for closure. In the eight weeks before he died, Maldonado had rarely been let out of his cell and was denied family visits, mental health care, and educational services. A report by California's Office of the Inspector General states "the effects of this eight-week isolation and service deprivation may have contributed to the Ward’s suicide." Don Specter, director of the Prison Law Office, was quoted as saying "This is the first report that directly links their [i.e., the guards'] practices with a death."

The extended lockdown at the facility was contrary to the rehabilitative mission of the state's youth corrections system, according to state officials. Deputy Inspector Morgan said the eight-week lockdown was known about by at least two top-level juvenile corrections officials in Sacramento.

During lockdowns, wards are allowed showers three times a week, but are allowed no time to attend school, exercise or interact with mental health professionals.

The Prison Law Office website notes recent mission changes include reducing the number of the offenders and decreasing lockdowns. "It appears that the steps that CDCR and DJJ have taken since June 2007 have improved DJJ’s management effectiveness and the capacity of CDCR/DJJ business systems; however, issues of effectiveness and capacity continue to interfere with DJJ’s progress towards compliance with the remedial plans."

The same report notes that in 2007 Chad hired a Chief Psychologist, Dr. Eric Kunkel, who in turn brought on many more psychologists, licensed psychiatric technicians and psychiatrists to attend to youth needs.

== Female Wards ==
In 1913, girls were transferred to the newly established Ventura School for Girls from the formerly coed Whittier State Reformatory. The Ventura School for Girls moved from its Ventura location to Camarillo in 1962 and became co-educational in 1970. The Ventura Youth Correctional Facility returned to being a females-only facility in 2004. The facility closed in 2023 and was shuttered. The S. Carraway Public Service and Fire Protection Center was closed in 2011 and fire crews were consolidated in the Pine Grove facility.

== Foster grandparent programs ==
Because few parents participate, foster grandparents at DJJ facilities fill the role of surrogate parents. All foster grandparents receive training from Special Education Resource Specialists and multi-language training.

== Reform ==
Juvenile Justice Division reports, spurred by litigation against the CYA, were released in January 2004. Their reports confirmed serious abuses and major deficiencies in virtually every aspect of the CYA's operation and criticized the agency for failing in its rehabilitative and public safety mission. The experts found the CYA to be incompetent in every area reviewed: the safety of the facilities, the quality of education and health care, and the efficacy of the mental health, substance abuse and other treatment programs. The system, according to the experts, was not simply failing to rehabilitate, it was demonstrably inflicting damage on incarcerated youths, who were often discharged with increased criminal sophistication, entrenched gang involvement and exacerbated mental illness.

On September 1, 2005, DJJ submitted a report on youth corrections reform to the California Legislature. The report required DJJ to file quarterly reports on steps taken, using $1.2 million in fiscal year 2005-06 planning funds, toward implementing an overall reform plan, including any proposed changes in population, jurisdiction or length of stay or changes in state-local juvenile justice responsibilities and "specific objectives, tasks and timelines." However, DJJ presented no objectives, tasks or timelines for reform. Nor did it offer new plans to adjust the institutionalized population. Rather, DJJ said that "at this time" the department does not propose to change any state laws with respect to "jurisdictional eligibility criteria, including age, gender, offense criteria, medical or mental health needs or length of confinement".

== Criticism and calls for closure ==
There have been many calls to shut down DJJ/CYA altogether. A spate of such calls came in the wake of scandals arising after a video tape surfaced, in 2004, of a youth being punched in the head repeatedly by a guard at the Stockton facility and two youths dying there.

Critics point to reports that over 90% of those released from DJJ (then CYA) ended up in adult prison, and that within three years five percent are dead and only four percent are in school or working. DJJ does have a ward data system, the Offender Based Information Tracking System (OBITS), which compiles some demographic data, drug test results and length of incarceration.

DJJ officers and guards are not armed — no firearms are allowed within juvenile institutions. Officers carry a firearm on their person outside of the institution or transporting a youthful offender to Court or a medical facility. Youthful Offenders are no longer kept in cages following Farrell reforms.

Teens with mental health problems were made worse, not better, by a system that is failing to rehabilitate kids, according to reports by independent experts.

Among larger states, California consistently has had the highest youth incarceration rate, with more than double the national average youth incarceration rate, which critics decry for contributing to chronic overcrowding, unsafe conditions, poor health services, and numerous related problems, including gang violence.

A July 2008 report by California's Little Hoover Commission recommended that the state "eliminate its juvenile justice operations by 2011" by "turning supervision of all youth offenders over to counties and providing the resources for counties and county consortiums to supervise the most serious youth offenders".

Some California Youth Authority juvenile prisons were known as "Gladiator Schools" by the wards who were incarcerated there. An oral history of stories from inside the California Youth Authority is documented by David Reeve (2017-2024). "Gladiator School: Stories from Inside YTS (An oral history from those who were incarcerated in the California Youth Authority)".

All Division of Juvenile Justice facilities closed on July 1, 2023.

== Former facilities ==
- Preston Youth Correctional Facility (Ione) - CDCR announced on Thursday October 21, 2010 that Preston is closing, and is now closed.
- Camp Joseph Scott - located in Los Angeles County
- Fred C. Nelles Youth Correctional Facility - located in Whittier, California

== Notable people ==
=== Inmates ===
- Abraham Acosta, one of two murderers of Stuart Tay
- Lawrence Bittaker (1940-2019), serial killer and one of the two "Tool Box Killers"; sentenced for car theft, a hit and run, and evading arrest
- Steven David Catlin (born 1944), serial killer; served 9 months at age 19 for forgery charges
- Fleeta Drumgo (1945-1979), member of the San Quentin Six; was referred for first degree burglary
- Chol Soo Lee (1952-2014), immigrant wrongfully convicted of murder; served 13 months at CYA in 1967
- Bruce Lisker (born 1965), wrongfully convicted of murder; served time in several prisons, including CYA
- Marlene Olive (born 1959), one of two perpetrators of the 1975 "Barbeque murders"; was released at age 21
- Juan Pena, accomplice of gangster and murderer Joe Saenz; died of leukemia at CYA in 2001
- Raul Rojas (1941-2012), featherweight boxer; was incarcerated as a gang leader in his youth
- Shorty Rossi (born 1969), productions owner and actor; was sentenced for several felonies
- Andre DeSean Wicker (born 1970), rapper better known as "Dresta"; was sentenced for assault
- Keith Daniel Williams (1947-1996), triple murderer; was sentenced as a juvenile for auto theft, attempted forgery, and several burglaries
- Anthony Wimberly (born 1962), serial killer; sentenced for robbery and later burglary

=== Staff ===
- B. T. Collins (1940-1993), politician; director
- Karl Holton (1898-1978), probation officer
- Regina Louise, author and child advocate; was a ward
- William S. Mailliard (1917-1992), banker and WW2 veteran; was assistant director
- William G. Steiner (born 1937), children's advocate

== See also ==
- Incarceration in California
- Youth incarceration in the United States
- Teenage suicide in the United States
