= Floyd Robertson (boxer) =

Ghanaian boxer

Personal information
- Nickname: Klutei
- Nationality: Ghanaian
- Born: Floyd Clottey Quartey; 7 January 1937 Accra, Ghana
- Died: 1 January 1983 (aged 45)
- Height: 5 ft 5 1/2 in (1.66 m)
- Weight: feather/super feather/lightweight

Boxing career

Boxing record
- Total fights: 51
- Wins: 34 (KO 11)
- Losses: 13 (KO 3)
- Draws: 4

Floyd "Klutei" Robertson (7 January 1937 – 1 January 1983) born in Accra was a Ghanaian professional feather/super feather/lightweight boxer of the 1950s and '60s who won the Ghanaian featherweight title, West African Featherweight Title, and Commonwealth super featherweight title, and was a challenger for the World Boxing Council (WBC) featherweight title, and World Boxing Association (WBA) World featherweight title against Sugar Ramos, and Vicente Saldivar, his professional fighting weight varied from 124 1/4 lb (56.4 kg; 8 st 12.3 lb), i.e. featherweight to 135 lb (61 kg; 9 st 9 lb), i.e. lightweight.
