= Boxing at the 1988 Summer Olympics – Featherweight =

Olympic boxing tournament

Featherweight boxing at the Games of the XXIV Olympiad
- Venue: Jamsil Students' Gymnasium
- Dates: 18 September – 2 October 1988
- Competitors: 48 from 48 nations

Medalists
1st place, gold medalist(s)		Giovanni Parisi	Italy
2nd place, silver medalist(s)		Daniel Dumitrescu	Romania
3rd place, bronze medalist(s)		Lee Jae-hyuk	South Korea
3rd place, bronze medalist(s)		Abdelhak Achik	Morocco

The men's featherweight event was part of the boxing programme at the 1988 Summer Olympics. The weight class allowed boxers of up to 57 kilograms to compete. The competition was held from 18 September to 2 October 1988. 48 boxers from 48 nations competed. Giovanni Parisi won the gold medal.

== Medalists ==
Gold	Giovanni Parisi; Italy
Silver	Daniel Dumitrescu; Romania
Bronze	Lee Jae-hyuk; South Korea
Bronze	Abdelhak Achik; Morocco

== Results ==
The following boxers took part in the event:

Rank	Name	Country
1	Giovanni Parisi	Italy
2	Daniel Dumitrescu	Romania
3T	Lee Jae-hyuk	South Korea
3T	Abdelhak Achik	Morocco
5T	Liu Dong	China
5T	Ya'acov Shmuel	Israel
5T	Regilio Tuur	Netherlands
5T	Tomasz Nowak	Poland
9T	Omar Catari	Venezuela
9T	Serge Bouemba	Gabon
9T	Mekhak Ghazaryan	Soviet Union
9T	Richard Pittman	Cook Islands
9T	Wanchai Pongsri	Thailand
9T	Dave Anderson	Great Britain
9T	Andre Seymour	Bahamas
9T	Kirkor Kirkorov	Bulgaria
17T	Frank Avelar	El Salvador
17T	Moussa Kagambega	Burkina Faso
17T	John Francis	India
17T	Ilham Lahia	Indonesia
17T	Ljubiša Simić	Yugoslavia
17T	Lu Chih-hsiung	Chinese Taipei
17T	John Mirona	Sudan
17T	Dumsane Mabuza	Swaziland
17T	Wataru Yamada	Japan
17T	Esteban Flores	Puerto Rico
17T	John Wanjau	Kenya
17T	Paul Fitzgerald	Ireland
17T	Ulaipalota Tauatama	Western Samoa
17T	Jarmo Eskelinen	Finland
17T	Jamie Pagendam	Canada
17T	Darrell Hiles	Australia
33T	Bakary Fofana	Ivory Coast
33T	Anthony Konyegwachie	Nigeria
33T	Patrick Mwamba	Zambia
33T	Ali Mohamed Jaffer	South Yemen
33T	László Szőke	Hungary
33T	Kelcie Banks	United States
33T	Domingo Damigella	Argentina
33T	Emilio Villegas	Dominican Republic
33T	Evance Malenga	Malawi
33T	Djingarey Mamoudou	Niger
33T	Orlando Dollente	Philippines
33T	Serigne Fall	Guinea
33T	Tserendorjiin Amarjargal	Mongolia
33T	Diego Drumm	East Germany
33T	Ali Çelikiz	Turkey
33T	Miguel Angel González	Mexico

=== First round ===
- Wataru Yamada (JPN) def. Bakary Fofana (IVC), RSC-1
- Daniel Dumitrescu (ROU) def. Anthony Konyegwachie (NGA), 5:0
- Esteban Flores (PUR) def. Patrick Mwamba (ZAM), 4:1
- Wanchai Pongsri (THA) def. Ali Mohamed Jafer (YMD), RSC-1
- John Wanjau (KEN) def. László Szõke (HUN), 3:2
- Regilio Tuur (HOL) def. Kelcie Banks (USA), KO-1
- David Anderson (GBR) def. Domingo Damigella (ARG), 4:1
- Patrick Fitzgerald (IRL) def. Emilio Villegas (DOM), 4:1
- Ulaipalota Tautauma (SAM) def. Evance Malenga (MLW), 5:0
- Tomasz Nowak (POL) def. Djingarey Mamodou (NIG), 5:0
- Eugene Seymour (BAH) def. Orlando Dollente (PHI), 5:0
- Jarmo Eskelinen (FIN) def. Serigne Fall (GUI), 5:0
- Jamie Pagendam (CAN) def. Tserendorj Amarjargal (MGL), RSC-2
- Kirkor Kirkorov (BUL) def. Diego Drumm (GDR), 5:0
- Darren Hiles (AUS) def. Ali Celikiz (TUR), 5:0
- Lee Jae-Hyuk (KOR) def. Miguel Ángel González (MEX), 5:0

=== Second round ===
- Abdelhak Achik (MAR) def. Francisco Avelar (ELS), 4:1
- Omar Catari (VEN) def. Moussa Kagambega (BUF), KO-1
- Liu Dong (CHN) def. John Francis (IND), 3:2
- Serge Bouemba (GAB) def. Ilham Lahia (INA), 4:1
- Mikhail Kazaryan (URS) def. Ljubiša Simić (YUG), 5:0
- Giovanni Parisi (ITA) def. Lu Chih Hsiung (TPE), 5:0
- Ya'acov Shmuel (ISR) def. John Mirona (SUD), RSC-1
- Richard Pittman (CIS) def. Dumsane Mabuza (SWZ), 4:1
- Daniel Dumitrescu (ROU) def. Wataru Yamada (JPN), 5:0
- Wanchai Pongsri (THA) def. Esteban Flores (PUR), 5:0
- Regilio Tuur (HOL) def. John Wanjau (KEN), 4:1
- David Anderson (GBR) def. Patrick Fitzgerald (IRL), 5:0
- Tomasz Nowak (POL) def. Ulaipalota Tautauma (SAM), walk-over
- Eugene Seymour (BAH) def. Jarmo Eskelinen (FIN), walk-over
- Kirkor Kirkorov (BUL) def. Jamie Pagendam (CAN), walk-over
- Lee Jae-Hyuk (KOR) def. Darren Hiles (AUS), 3:2

=== Third round ===
- Abdelhak Achik (MAR) def. Omar Catari (VEN), KO-1
- Liu Dong (CHN) def. Serge Bouemba (GAB), 5:0
- Giovanni Parisi (ITA) def. Mikhail Kazaryan (URS), RSC-2
- Ya'acov Shmuel (ISR) def. Richard Pittman (CIS), 5:0
- Daniel Dumitrescu (ROU) def. Wanchai Pongsri (THA), 3:2
- Regilio Tuur (HOL) def. David Anderson (GBR), RSC-2
- Tomasz Nowak (POL) def. Eugene Seymour (BAH), 5:0
- Lee Jae-Hyuk (KOR) def. Kirkor Kirkorov (BUL), 5:0

=== Quarterfinals ===
- Abdelhak Achik (MAR) def. Liu Dong (CHN), KO-1
- Giovanni Parisi (ITA) def. Ya'acov Shmuel (ISR), 5:0
- Daniel Dumitrescu (ROU) def. Regilio Tuur (HOL), 5:0
- Lee Jae-Hyuk (KOR) def. Tomasz Nowak (POL), 5:0

=== Semifinals ===
- Giovanni Parisi (ITA) def. Abdelhak Achik (MAR), RSC-1
- Daniel Dumitrescu (ROU) def. Lee Jae-Hyuk (KOR), 5:0

=== Final ===
- Giovanni Parisi (ITA) def. Daniel Dumitrescu (ROU), KO-1
