= Boxing at the 1984 Summer Olympics – Featherweight =

Olympic boxing tournament

Featherweight boxing at the Games of the XXIII Olympiad
- Venue: Los Angeles Memorial Sports Arena
- Dates: 29 July – 11 August 1984
- Competitors: 36 from 36 nations

Medalists
1st place, gold medalist(s)		Meldrick Taylor	United States
2nd place, silver medalist(s)		Peter Konyegwachie	Nigeria
3rd place, bronze medalist(s)		Omar Catarí	Venezuela
3rd place, bronze medalist(s)		Turgut Aykaç	Turkey

The men's featherweight event was part of the boxing programme at the 1984 Summer Olympics. The weight class allowed boxers of up to 57 kilograms to compete. The competition was held from 29 July to 11 August 1984. 36 boxers from 36 nations competed.

== Medalists ==
Gold	Meldrick Taylor; United States
Silver	Peter Konyegwachie; Nigeria
Bronze	Omar Catarí; Venezuela
Bronze	Turgut Aykaç; Turkey

== Results ==
The following boxers took part in the event:

Rank	Name	Country
1	Meldrick Taylor	United States
2	Peter Konyegwachie	Nigeria
3T	Omar Catarí	Venezuela
3T	Turgut Aykaç	Turkey
5T	Park Hyeong-ok	South Korea
5T	John Wanjau	Kenya
5T	Mohamed Hegazi	Egypt
5T	Charles Lubulwa	Uganda
9T	Kevin Taylor	Great Britain
9T	Satoru Higashi	Japan
9T	Rajabu Hussen	Tanzania
9T	Javier Camacho	Mexico
9T	Abraham Mieses	Dominican Republic
9T	Alexander Wassa	Indonesia
9T	Rafael Zuñiga	Colombia
9T	Paul Fitzgerald	Ireland
17T	Jonathan Magagula	Swaziland
17T	Nirmal Lorick	Trinidad and Tobago
17T	Noureddine Boughanmi	Tunisia
17T	Azzedine Saïd	Algeria
17T	Ed Pollard	Barbados
17T	Christian Kpakpo	Ghana
17T	Jean-Luc Bezoky	Madagascar
17T	Nicolae Talpoş	Romania
17T	Raúl Trapero	Spain
17T	Christopher Mwamba	Zambia
17T	Ayi Sodogah	Togo
17T	Orlando Fernández	Puerto Rico
17T	Ali Faki	Malawi
17T	Dieudonné Mzatsi	Gabon
17T	Steve Pagendam	Canada
32T	Stamatios Kolethras	Greece
32T	Shane Knox	Australia
32T	Steve Frank	Guyana
32T	Tobi Pelly	Sudan
32T	Boubagar Soumana	Niger

=== First round ===
- Ali Faki (MLW) def. Stamatos Kolethras (GRE), 4:1
- Charles Lubulwa (UGA) def. Shane Knox (AUS), 4:1
- Dieudonne Mzatsi (GAB) def. Steven Frank (GUY), 5:0
- Paul Fitzgerald (IRL) def. Tobi Pelly (SUD), 5:0
- Steve Pagendam (CAN) def. Boubacar Soumana (NIG), RSC-3

=== Second round ===
- Kevin Taylor (GBR) def. Jonathan Magagula (SWZ), 5:0
- Park Hyung-Ok (KOR) def. Nirmal Lorick (TRI), 3:2
- Satoru Higashi (JPN) def. Noureddine Boughani (TUN), 4:1
- Omar Catari (VEN) def. Azzedine Said (ALG), RSC-2
- Rajabu Hussen (TNZ) def. Edward Pollard (BRB), 5:0
- John Wanjau (KEN) def. Christian Kpakpo (GHA), 5:0
- Javier Camacho (MEX) def. Jean Bezooki (MDG), RSC-3
- Meldrick Taylor (USA) def. Nicolae Talpos (ROU), 5:0
- Türgüt Aykaç (TUR) def. Raul Trapero (ESP), 5:0
- Abraham Mieses (DOM) def. Chris Mwamba (ZAM), 4:1
- Mohamed Hegazi (EGY) def. Avi Soodogah (TOG), 5:0
- Alex Wassa (INA) def. Wisut Meesuanthong (THA), walk-over
- Rafael Zuñiga (COL) def. Orlando Fernandez (PUR), RSC-3
- Peter Konyegwachie (NGR) def. Ali Faki (MLW), 5:0
- Charles Lubulwa (UGA) def. Dieudonne Mzatsi (GAB), 5:0
- Paul Fitzgerald (IRL) def. Steve Pagendam (CAN), 3:2

=== Third round ===
- Park Hyung-Ok (KOR) def. Kevin Taylor (GBR), 3:2
- Omar Catari (VEN) def. Satoru Higashi (JPN), 4:1
- John Wanjau (KEN) def. Rajabu Hussen (TNZ), 4:1
- Meldrick Taylor (USA) def. Javier Camacho (MEX), 5:0
- Türgüt Aykaç (TUR) def. Abraham Mieses (DOM), RSC-3
- Mohamed Hegazi (EGY) def. Alex Wassa (INA), 3:2
- Peter Konyegwachie (NGR) def. Rafael Zuñiga (COL), 4:1
- Charles Lubulwa (UGA) def. Paul Fitzgerald (IRL), 3:2

=== Quarterfinals ===
- Omar Catari (VEN) def. Park Hyung-Ok (KOR), 4:1
- Meldrick Taylor (USA) def. John Wanjau (KEN), RSC-3
- Türgüt Aykaç (TUR) def. Mohamed Hegazi (EGY), RSC-1
- Peter Konyegwachie (NGR) def. Charles Lubulwa (UGA), 5:0

=== Semifinals ===
- Meldrick Taylor (USA) def. Omar Catari (VEN), 5:0
- Peter Konyegwachie (NGR) def. Türgüt Aykaç (TUR), 5:0

=== Final ===
- Meldrick Taylor (USA) def. Peter Konyegwachie (NGR), 5:0
