= Venezuela at the 1984 Summer Olympics =

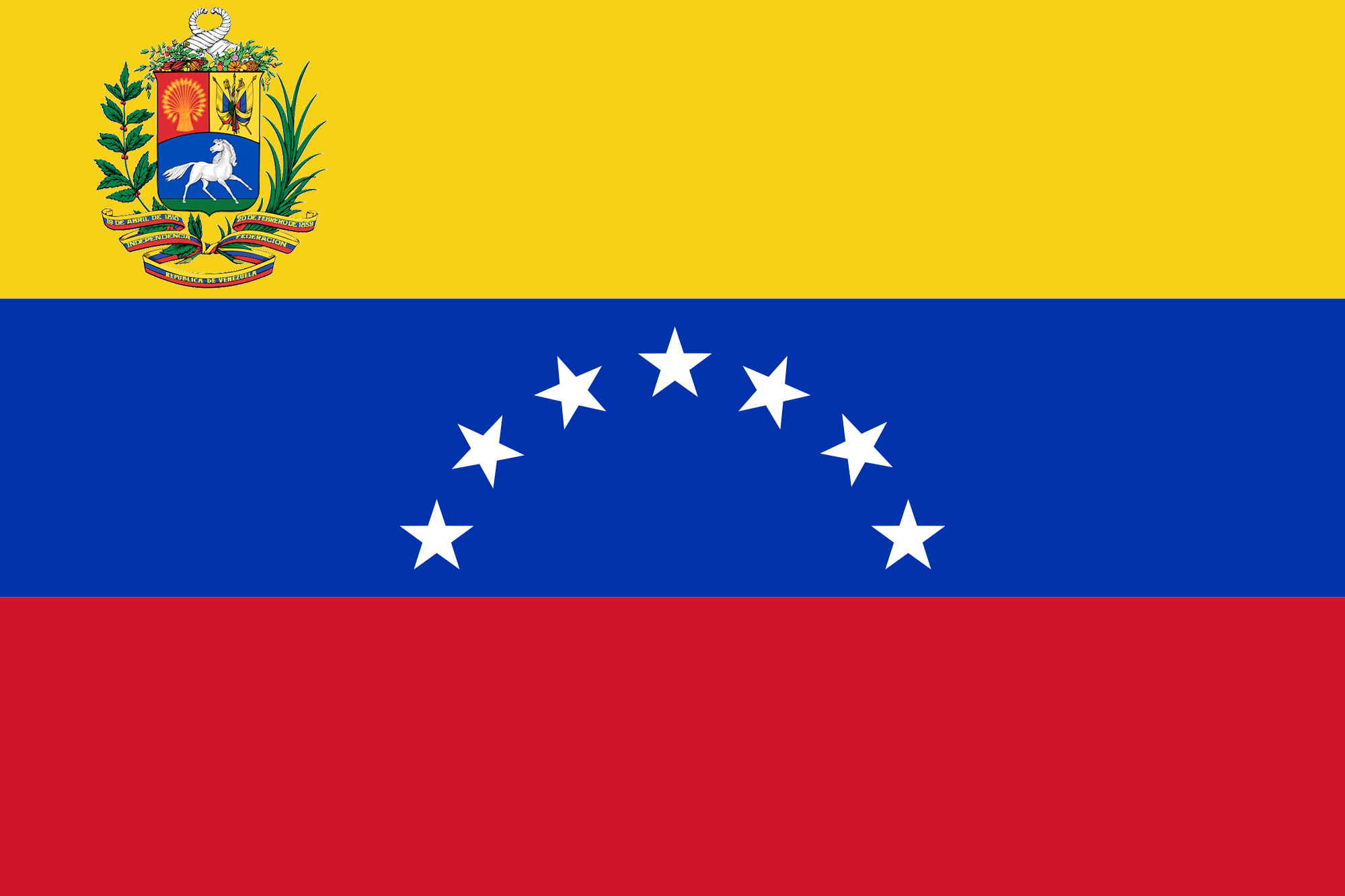
- IOC code: VEN
- NOC: Venezuelan Olympic Committee

in Los Angeles
- Competitors: 26 in 10 sports
- Flag bearer: William Wuycke
- Medals Ranked 40th: Gold 0 Silver 0 Bronze 3 Total 3

Summer Olympics appearances (overview)
- 1948; 1952; 1956; 1960; 1964; 1968; 1972; 1976; 1980; 1984; 1988; 1992; 1996; 2000; 2004; 2008; 2012; 2016; 2020; 2024

Venezuela competed at the 1984 Summer Olympics in Los Angeles, United States. 26 competitors, 25 men and 1 woman, took part in 29 events in 10 sports.

== Medalists ==
Medal	Name	Sport	Event	Date
Bronze	Rafael Vidal	Swimming	Men's 200 metre butterfly	3 August
Bronze	Marcelino Bolivar	Boxing	Men's light-flyweight	9 August
Bronze	Omar Catarí	Boxing	Men's featherweight	9 August

== Athletics ==
Men's Decathlon

- Douglas Fernández

- Final Result — 7553 points (→ 18th place)

== Boxing ==
Men's Light Flyweight (– 48 kg)

- Marcelino Bolivar → Bronze Medal
  1. First Round — Defeated Nelson Jamili (Philippines), on points (5:0)
  2. Second Round — Defeated Agapito Gómez (Spain), on points (4:1)
  3. Quarterfinals — Defeated Carlos Motta (Guatemala), on points (5:0)
  4. Semifinals — Lost to Paul Gonzales (United States), on points (1:4)

Men's Bantamweight (– 54 kg)

- Manuel Vilchez
  1. First Round — Lost to John Siryakibbe (Uganda), on points (2:3)

Men's Featherweight (– 57 kg)

- Omar Catari → Bronze Medal
  1. First Round — Bye
  2. Second Round — Defeated Azzedine Said (Algeria), RSC-2
  3. Third Round — Defeated Satoru Higashi (Japan), on points (4:1)
  4. Quarterfinals — Defeated Park Hyung-Ok (South Korea), on points (4:1)
  5. Semifinals — Lost to Meldrick Taylor (United States), on points (0:5)

== Cycling ==
Two cyclists represented Venezuela in 1984.

Individual road race

- Enrique Campos
- Fernando Correa

== Diving ==
Men's 3m Springboard

- Carlos Isturiz

- Preliminary Round — 483.00 (→ did not advance, 21st place)

== Fencing ==
Two fencers, both men, represented Venezuela in 1984.

Men's foil

- José Rafael Magallanes

Men's épée

- José Rafael Magallanes

Men's sabre

- Ildemaro Sánchez

== Swimming ==
Men's 100m Freestyle

- Alberto Mestre Sosa

- Heat — 50.99
- Final — 50.70 (→ 6th place)

Men's 200m Freestyle

- Alberto Mestre Sosa

- Heat — 1:50.73
- Final — 1:50.23 (→ 5th place)

- Jean-Marie François

- Heat — 1:55.28 (→ did not advance, 29th place)

Men's 400m Freestyle

- Jean-Marie François

- Heat — 4:03.08 (→ did not advance, 24th place)

Men's 100m Backstroke

- Giovanni Frigo

- Heat — 59.34 (→ did not advance, 25th place)

Men's 200m Backstroke

- Giovanni Frigo

- Heat — 2:07.56 (→ did not advance, 21st place)

Men's 100m Breaststroke

- Jorge Henão

- Heat — 1:09.01 (→ did not advance, 40th place)

Men's 200m Breaststroke

- Jorge Henão

- Heat — 2:28.03 (→ did not advance, 31st place)

Men's 100m Butterfly

- Rafael Vidal Castro

- Heat — 54.33
- Final — 54.27 (→ 4th place)

Men's 200m Butterfly

- Rafael Vidal Castro

- Heat — 1:59.15
- Final — 1:57.51 (→ Bronze Medal)

- Alberto José Umana

- Heat — 2:05.29 (→ did not advance, 23rd place)

Men's 4 × 100 m Freestyle Relay

- Alberto Mestre Sosa, Alberto José Umana, Rafael Vidal, and Jean-Marie François

- Heat — 3:30.24 (→ did not advance, 12th place)

Men's 4 × 200 m Freestyle Relay

- Jean-Marie François, Alberto José Umana, Rafael Vidal Castro, and Alberto Mestre Sosa

- Heat — 7:31.79 (→ did not advance, 10th place)

Men's 4 × 100 m Medley Relay

- Giovanni Frigo, Jorge Henão, Rafael Vidal Castro, and Alberto Mestre Sosa

- Heat — 3:55.12 (→ did not advance, 13th place)
