= Regilio Tuur =

Dutch boxer (born 1967)

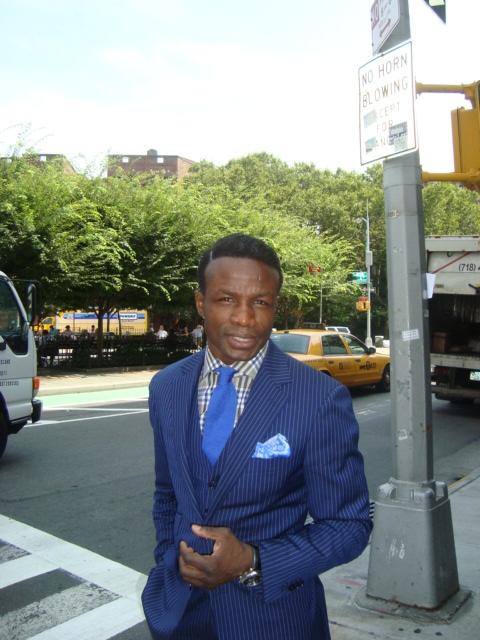

Personal information
- Nicknames: Turbo, Tuurrific
- Nationality: Dutch
- Born: Regilio Benito Tuur; 12 August 1967 (age 59) Paramaribo, Suriname
- Height: 5 ft 7.5 in (1.71 m)
- Weight: Super featherweight; Lightweight

Boxing career
- Stance: Orthodox

Boxing record
- Total fights: 51
- Wins: 46
- Win by KO: 30
- Losses: 4
- Draws: 1
Medal record
Men's Boxing
Representing the Netherlands
European Amateur Championships
Bronze medal – third place	1987 Turin	Featherweight

Regilio Benito Tuur (born 12 August 1967) is a Dutch former boxer who was WBO super featherweight champion.

Prior to turning professional and winning the world title, Tuur knocked out reigning world champion Kelcie Banks in the first round at the 1988 Summer Olympics in Seoul.

== Amateur career ==
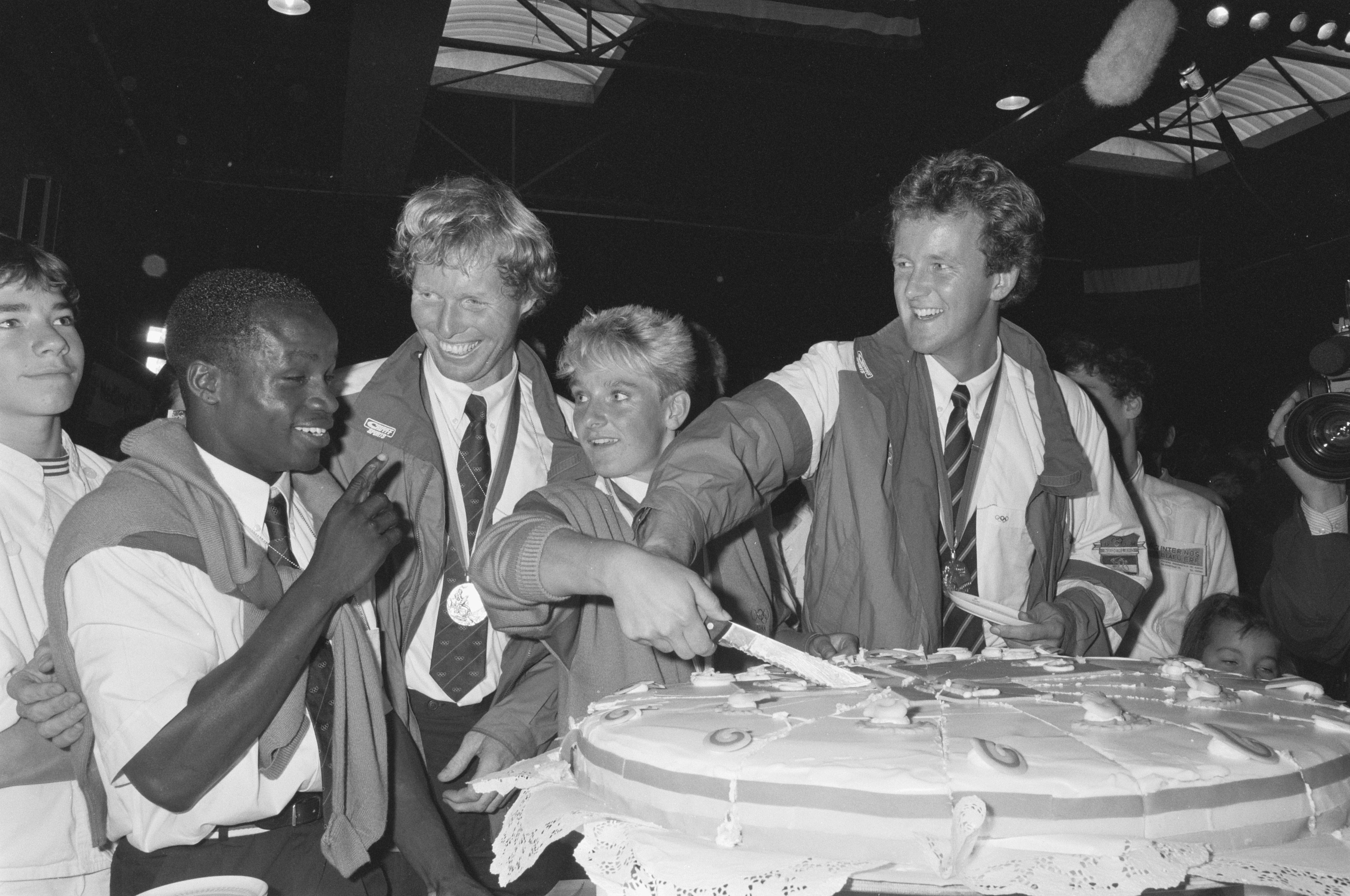
Tuur in 1988 with fellow Dutch Olympians Ronald Florijn, Monique Knol and Nico Rienks

After winning a bronze medal at the 1987 European Amateur Boxing Championships, Tuur was selected to participate at the Olympics.

His 1988 Olympic Results as a featherweight are:

- Defeated Kelcie Banks, USA KO 1
- Defeated John Wanjau, Kenya 4-1
- Defeated David Anderson, Great Britain RSC 2
- Lost to Daniel Dumitrescu, Romania 0-5 (quarterfinals)

== Professional career ==
In 1989, Tuur turned professional with his first fight held in New York. On 3 December 1992, he won the European super featherweight title by beating Jacobin Yoma by way of points. However, in his second defense, he lost the title in a rematch against Yoma by split decision.

On 24 September 1994, Tuur won the vacant WBO super featherweight world title by beating Eugene Speed by unanimous decision in his hometown Rotterdam. He subsequently defended the title against Tony Pep, Pete Taliaferro, Luis Mendoza, Giorgio Campanella, Narciso Valenzuela, and Jose Vida Ramos, before retiring in 1996.

In August 2001, Tuur made a comeback and fought four more bouts until May 2002, winning three of them. His defeat came in November 2001 against Orlando Salido by split decision.

== Professional boxing record ==
51 fights	46 wins	4 losses
By knockout	30	0
By decision	16	4
Draws	1	

No.	Result	Record	Opponent	Type	Round, time	Date	Location	Notes
51	Win	46–4–1	(United States) Jimmy Zeikle	KO	2 (10)	May 2, 2002	Rijnhal, Arnhem, Netherlands	
50	Win	45–4–1	(United States) Shawn Simmons	KO	2 (10)	Dec 20, 2001	Topsportcentrum Rotterdam, Rotterdam, Netherlands	
49	Loss	44–4–1	(Mexico) Orlando Salido	SD	8	Nov 23, 2001	(United States) Roseland Ballroom, New York City, New York, U.S.	
48	Win	44–3–1	(Dominican Republic) Freddy Cruz	UD	8	Aug 30, 2001	(United States) The Roxy, Boston, Massachusetts, U.S.	
47	Win	43–3–1	(Dominican Republic) Jose Vida Ramos	KO	1 (12)	Sep 6, 1996	(United States) Ballys Park Place Hotel Casino, Atlantic City, New Jersey, U.S.	Retained WBO super featherweight title
46	Win	42–3–1	(Mexico) Narciso Valenzuela Romo	KO	1 (12)	Apr 1, 1996	Sporthal Maaspoort, Den Bosch, Netherlands	Retained WBO super featherweight title
45	Win	41–3–1	(Italy) Giorgio Campanella	UD	12	Dec 23, 1995	RAI Amsterdam, Amsterdam, Netherlands	Retained WBO super featherweight title
44	Win	40–3–1	(Colombia) Luis Mendoza	RTD	10 (12)	Sep 16, 1995	Sportcentrum Valkenhuizen, Arnhem, Netherlands	Retained WBO super featherweight title
43	Win	39–3–1	(United States) Pete Taliaferro	TKO	5 (12)	Jun 17, 1995	(United States) Performing Arts Theater, New Orleans, Louisiana, U.S.	Retained WBO super featherweight title
42	Win	38–3–1	(Canada) Tony Pep	UD	12	Jul 10, 1993	Martinihal, Groningen, Netherlands	Retained WBO super featherweight title
41	Win	37-3–1	(United States) Eugene Speed	UD	12	Sep 24, 1994	Sportpaleis Ahoy, Rotterdam, Netherlands	Won vacant WBO super featherweight title
40	Win	36–3–1	(United States) Bobby Johnson	TKO	4 (10)	Apr 18, 1994	Sportpaleis Ahoy, Rotterdam, Netherlands	
39	Win	35–3–1	(Russia) Boris Sinitsin	UD	10	Mar 7, 1994	Sportpaleis Ahoy, Rotterdam, Netherlands	
38	Win	34–3–1	(Mexico) Gabriel Castro	TKO	6 (10), 1:04	Dec 18, 1993	(United States) Caesars Tahoe, Stateline, Nevada, U.S.	
37	Win	33–3–1	(United States) Tommy Parks	PTS	10	Aug 30, 1993	(United States) Kemper Arena, Kansas City, Missouri, U.S.	
36	Loss	32–3–1	(French Guiana) Jacobin Yoma	SD	12	Jun 11, 1993	(France) Cayenne, French Guiana	Lost European super featherweight title
35	Win	32–2–1	(Italy) Michele La Fratta	TKO	7 (12)	Mar 23, 1993	Sportpaleis Ahoy, Rotterdam, Netherlands	Retained European super featherweight title
34	Win	31–2–1	(French Guiana) Jacobin Yoma	PTS	12	Dec 3, 1992	Sportpaleis Ahoy, Rotterdam, Netherlands	Won vacant European super featherweight title
33	Win	30–2–1	(United States) Richard Salazar	TKO	3 (10), 1:45	Sep 25, 1992	(United States) Friar Tuck Inn, Catskill, New York, U.S.	
32	Win	29–2–1	(United Kingdom) Paul Harvey	KO	5 (8)	Jun 2, 1992	Weenahal, Rotterdam, Netherlands	
31	Loss	28-2-1	(United States) Calvin Grove	SD	10	Mar 27, 1992	(United States) Friar Tuck Inn, Catskill, New York, U.S.	
30	Win	28–1–1	(Mexico) Armando Morales Terron	TKO	2 (10)	Mar 3, 1992	Jaap Edenhal, Amsterdam, Netherlands	
29	Win	27–1–1	(Democratic Republic of the Congo) Tshoza Mukuta	TKO	2 (10)	Jan 31, 1992	Waregem, Belgium	
28	Win	26–1–1	(United States) Bobby Brewer	UD	10	Dec 5, 1991	(United States) Memorial Auditorium, Greenville, South Carolina, U.S.	
27	Win	25–1–1	(Dominican Republic) Danilo Cabrera	RTD	6 (10), 3:00	Oct 4, 1991	Waregem, Belgium	
26	Win	24–1–1	(Colombia) Wilson Fontalvo	PTS	10	Aug 31, 1991	Sentro Deportivo Korsou, Willemstad, Curaçao	
25	Win	23–1–1	(Venezuela) José Sanabria	SD	10	Jul 23, 1991	(United States) Kushers Country Club, Monticello, New York, U.S.	
24	Win	22–1–1	(Panama) Tomas Arguelles	KO	4 (10), 2:44	Jun 14, 1991	(United States) Ramada Hotel, New York City, New York, U.S.	
23	Win	21–1–1	(France) Jean Pierre Dibateza	PTS	8	May 27, 1991	Weenahal, Rotterdam, Netherlands	
22	Win	20–1–1	(Dominican Republic) Manuel Batista	KO	1 (10)	Mar 25, 1991	(United States) Meadowlands Convention Center, Secaucus, New Jersey, U.S.	
21	Win	19–1–1	(United States) Steve Whetstone	TKO	2 (10)	Feb 12, 1991	Sportpaleis Ahoy, Rotterdam, Netherlands	
20	Win	18–1–1	(Mali) Moussa Sangare	KO	7 (10)	Nov 12, 1990	World Trade Center, Rotterdam, Netherlands	
19	Win	17–1–1	(United States) Jose Ramon Tirado	TKO	1 (10), 2:20	Oct 30, 1990	(United States) Pines Hotel, South Fallsburg, New York, U.S.	
18	Win	16–1–1	(Guyana) Jeff Roberts	KO	2 (8), 1:58	Aug 23, 1990	(United States) Villa Roma Resort, Callicoon, New York, U.S.	
17	Win	15–1–1	(United States) Alberto Rendon	UD	6	Jul 22, 1990	(United States) Harrah's Marina Hotel Casino, Atlantic City, New Jersey, U.S.	
16	Win	14–1–1	(United Kingdom) Andy DeAbreu	RTD	4 (8), 3:00	Jun 19, 1990	France	
15	Win	13–1–1	(Mexico) Victor Navarro	TKO	1 (6), 2:08	May 25, 1990	(United States) Trump Plaza Hotel, Atlantic City, New Jersey, U.S.	
14	Win	12–1–1	(Uganda) Patrick Kamy	KO	4 (8)	May 7, 1990	Rijnhal, Arhnem, Netherlands	
13	Win	11–1–1	(United States) Johnny Glen Alvarado	TKO	5 (8)	Mar 31, 1990	(United States) Trump Castle, Atlantic City, New Jersey, U.S.	
12	Win	10–1–1	(United Kingdom) Colin Lynch	TKO	3 (8)	Feb 21, 1990	Rotterdam, Netherlands	
11	Win	9–1–1	(United Kingdom) Dean Lynch	UD	6	Feb 19, 1990	Rijnhal, Arnhem, Netherlands	
10	Draw	8–1–1	(French Guiana) Jacobin Yoma	MD	6	Feb 12, 1990	(United States) Westchester County Center, White Plains, New York, U.S.	
9	Loss	8–1	(United States) Fernando Rodriguez	MD	6	Jan 29, 1990	(United States) Trump Plaza Hotel, Atlantic City, New Jersey, U.S.	
8	Win	8–0	(United States) Juan Ramon Muriel	PTS	6	Jan 12, 1990	(United States) Hofstra University, Hempstead, New York, U.S.	
7	Win	7–0	(United Kingdom) Karl Taylor	TKO	2 (8)	Dec 23, 1989	Sporthal Hoogvliet, Rotterdam, Netherlands	
6	Win	6–0	(United States) Willie McNeal	TKO	1	Nov 30, 1989	(United States) Trump Plaza Hotel, Atlantic City, New Jersey, U.S.	
5	Win	5–0	(Mexico) Jose Luis Soto	TKO	3	Nov 13, 1989	Houtrusthallen, The Hague, Netherlands	
4	Win	4–0	(France) Pierre Conan	KO	2	Oct 30, 1989	Houtrusthallen, The Hague, Netherlands	
3	Win	3–0	(Puerto Rico) Agustin Silva	KO	3 (4)	Aug 24, 1989	(United States) Felt Forum, New York City, New York, U.S.	
2	Win	2–0	(Mexico) Manuel Gomez	UD	2 (4), 2:49	Aug 10, 1989	(United States) Felt Forum, New York City, New York, U.S.	
1	Win	1–0	(Puerto Rico) Daniel Pantoja	TKO	1 (4), 2:06	Jul 27, 1989	(United States) Felt Forum, New York City, New York, U.S.	

== Personal life ==
Tuur was born in Paramaribo, Suriname in a family of ten children. His mother emigrated with his stepfather to the Netherlands. At the age of six, Tuur also moved to the Netherlands, where he grew up in Rotterdam.

He lived in Hempstead, Long Island for several years with his wife and daughter.

In 2003, he was sentenced to twenty months in prison for various violent offences, including beating his wife and assaulting a police officer.

Sporting positions
Regional boxing titles
Vacant Title last held by Jimmi Bredahl	European super featherweight champion 3 December 1992 – 11 June 1993	Succeeded by Jacobin Yoma
World boxing titles
Vacant Title last held by Oscar De La Hoya	WBO super featherweight champion 24 September 1994 – 17 January 1997; Vacated	Vacant Title next held by Barry Jones
Awards
Preceded by Pieter Slot	Rotterdam Sportsman of the Year; 1988	Succeeded by Koos Maasdijk
Preceded by Jeroen van Dijk	Rotterdam Sportsman of the Year; 1992	Succeeded by John den Braber
Preceded by John den Braber	Rotterdam Sportsman of the Year; 1994 – 1995	Succeeded by Koos Maasdijk
Preceded by Falko Zandstra	Dutch Sportsman of the Year; 1994	Succeeded by Danny Nelissen
