= Indonesia at the 1988 Summer Olympics =

- IOC code: INA
- NOC: Indonesian Olympic Committee

in Seoul
- Competitors: 29 in 11 sports
- Flag bearer: Tonny Maringgi
- Medals Ranked 36th: Gold 0 Silver 1 Bronze 0 Total 1

Summer Olympics appearances (overview)
- 1952; 1956; 1960; 1964; 1968; 1972; 1976; 1980; 1984; 1988; 1992; 1996; 2000; 2004; 2008; 2012; 2016; 2020; 2024

Indonesia competed at the 1988 Summer Olympics in Seoul, South Korea. The nation won its first ever Olympic medal. 29 competitors, 26 men and 3 women, took part in 32 events in 11 sports.

== Medalists ==
| Medal | Name | Sport | Event | Date |
|---|---|---|---|---|
| Silver | Lilies Handayani; Nurfitriyana Saiman; Kusuma Wardhani | Archery | Women's team | 1 October |

== Competitors ==
The following is the list of number of competitors in the Games.

| Sport | Men | Women | Total |
|---|---|---|---|
| Archery | 1 | 3 | 4 |
| Athletics | 5 | 0 | 5 |
| Boxing | 2 | – | 2 |
| Fencing | 1 | 1 | 2 |
| Sailing | 2 | 0 | 2 |
| Shooting | 0 | 1 | 1 |
| Swimming | 2 | 0 | 2 |
| Table tennis | 1 | 0 | 1 |
| Tennis | 2 | 1 | 3 |
| Weightlifting | 5 | – | 5 |
| Wrestling | 2 | – | 2 |
| Total | 23 | 6 | 29 |

== Archery ==
In Indonesia's fourth Olympic archery competition, the women's team won the nation's first Olympic medal of any sport. Their one-point lead over the Soviet Union put them in a tie with the United States for second place behind the dominant Korean team and guaranteeing the Indonesians a medal. A 72–67 shootout victory made it a silver.

Women's Individual Competition:

- Nurfitriyana Saiman – Semifinal (→ 9th place)
- Kusuma Wardhani – 1/8 final (→ 19th place)
- Lilies Handayani – Preliminary Round (→ 30th place)

Men's Individual Competition:

- Syafrudin Mawi – Preliminary Round (→ 48th place)

Women's Team Competition:

- Nurfitriyana Saiman, Kusuma Wardhani, and Lilies Handayani – Final (→ Silver medal)

== Athletics ==
Key

- Note–Ranks given for track events are within the athlete's heat only
- Q = Qualified for the next round
- q = Qualified for the next round as a fastest loser or, in field events, by position without achieving the qualifying target
- NR = National record
- N/A = Round not applicable for the event
- Bye = Athlete not required to compete in round

Men's Track
| Athlete | Event | Heat | | Quarterfinal | | Semifinal | | Final | |
| Athlete | Event | Result | Rank | Result | Rank | Result | Rank | Result | Rank |
|---|---|---|---|---|---|---|---|---|---|
| Mardi Lestari | 100 metres | 10.40 | 3 (Heat 2) | 10.32 | 2 (Heat 6) | 10.39 | 7 (Heat 1) | Did not advance | |
| Eduardus Nabunome | 5000 metres | 14:19.40 | 14 (Heat 2) | Did not advance | | | | | |
| Eduardus Nabunome | 10,000 metres | 29:55.23 | 17 (Heat 1) | Did not advance | | | | | |
| Mardi Lestari; Kresno Eko Pambudi; Elieser Wattebosi; Mohamed Yusuf | 4 × 100 metres | —N/a | | DNF | DNF (Heat 2) | Did not advance | | | |

== Boxing ==
| Athlete | Event | Round of 32 | Round of 16 | Quarterfinals | Semifinals | Final | |
| Athlete | Event | Opposition Result | Opposition Result | Opposition Result | Opposition Result | Opposition Result | Rank |
|---|---|---|---|---|---|---|---|
| Ilham Lahia | Featherweight | Bouemba (GAB); L 1-4 | Did not advance | | | | |
| Adrian Taroreh | Lightweight | Kane (GBR); L 0-5 | Did not advance | | | | |

== Fencing ==
Two fencers, one man and one woman, represented Indonesia in 1988.

Men's foil

- Alkindi

Women's foil

- Silvia Koeswandi

== Sailing ==
Men

| Athlete | Event | Race | | | | | | | Net points | Final rank |
| Athlete | Event | 1 | 2 | 3 | 4 | 5 | 6 | 7 | Net points | Final rank |
|---|---|---|---|---|---|---|---|---|---|---|
| Abdul Malik Faisal | Men's Division II | 31 | 24 | 20 | 32 | ~~RET~~ | 30 | 21 | 246 | 27th place |
| Eddy S. Suprapto | Finn | 25 | 27 | 29 | 26 | ~~DNF~~ | 25 | ~~RET~~ | 242 | 31st place |

== Shooting ==
Women's Sporting Pistol 25 metres

- Selvyana Adrian-Sofyan - 568 points, 35th place

== Swimming ==
| Athlete | Event | Heat | | |
| Athlete | Event | Time | Rank | Note |
|---|---|---|---|---|
| Richard Sam Bera | Men's 50 metre freestyle | 24.63 | 3 (Heat 4) | Did not advance |
| Richard Sam Bera | Men's 100 metre freestyle | 53.59 | 6 (Heat 5) | Did not advance |
| Richard Sam Bera | Men's 200 metre freestyle | 1:57.60 | 4 (Heat 4) | Did not advance |
| Richard Sam Bera | Men's 400 metre freestyle | 4:08.70 | 3 (Heat 2) | Did not advance |
| Richard Sam Bera | Men's 200 metre individual medley | 2:13.90 | 2 (Heat 3) | Did not advance |
| Wirmandi Sugriat | Men's 50 metre freestyle | 25.55 | 7 (Heat 3) | Did not advance |
| Wirmandi Sugriat | Men's 100 metre breaststroke | 1:06.22 | 4 (Heat 3) | Did not advance |
| Wirmandi Sugriat | Men's 200 metre breaststroke | 2:26.17 | 2 (Heat 2) | Did not advance |
| Wirmandi Sugriat | Men's 200 metre individual medley | 2:13.93 | 6 (Heat 4) | Did not advance |

== Table tennis ==
Men's singles

- Tonny Maringgi - 6 of 8, Group B

== Tennis ==
| Athlete | Event | Round of 32 | Round of 16 | Quarterfinals | Semifinals | Final / BM | |
| Athlete | Event | Opposition Score | Opposition Score | Opposition Score | Opposition Score | Opposition Score | Rank |
|---|---|---|---|---|---|---|---|
| Hary Suharyadi; Donald Wailan-Walalangi | Men's doubles | Flach / Seguso (USA); L 3–6, 1–6, 5–7 | Did not advance | | | | |
| Yayuk Basuki | Women's singles | Suire (FRA); L 3–6, 6–3, 0-6 | Did not advance | | | | |

== Weightlifting ==
| Athlete | Event | Snatch | | Clean & jerk | | Total | Rank |
| Athlete | Event | Result | Rank | Result | Rank | Total | Rank |
|---|---|---|---|---|---|---|---|
| Sodikin | Flyweight | 95.0 | =16 | 122.5 | 16 | 217.5 | 15 |
| Dirdja Wihardja | Bantamweight | 112.5 | =4 | 142.5 | =4 | 255.0 | 4 |
| Yon Haryono | Bantamweight | 100.0 | 18 | 137.5 | =8 | 237.5 | 18 |
| Catur Mei Studi | Featherweight | ~~110.0~~ | DNF | — | DNF | — | DNF |
| I Nyoman Sudarma | Middleweight | 145.0 | 11 | 175.0 | =12 | 320.0 | 10 |

== Wrestling ==
Men's freestyle 48 kg

- Suryadi Gunawan - Group stage

Men's freestyle 52 kg

- Surya Saputra - Group stage
