= Turgut Aykaç =

Turkish boxer (born 1958)

Olympic medal record

Men's Boxing

Representing Turkey

Olympic Games
Bronze medal – third place	1984 Los Angeles	Featherweight

Turgut Aykaç (born January 1, 1958, in Adana, Turkey) is a former boxer from Turkey. At the 1984 Summer Olympics, he won the bronze medal in the men's featherweight division (– 57 kg), alongside Omar Catari of Venezuela. In the semifinals he was defeated by eventual silver medalist Peter Konyegwachie of Nigeria.

He began boxing in 1975 for Adanaspor and fought 27 times for the national team. He was one of the three Turkish boxers along with Eyüp Can and Malik Beyleroğlu, who won the first Olympic medals in boxing for Turkey. They were also Turkey's first Olympic medals in other sport than wrestling.

== Olympic results ==
- 1st round bye
- Defeated Raul Trapero (Spain) 5-0
- Defeated Abraham Mieses (Dominican Republic) RSC 3
- Defeated Mohamed Hegazy (Egypt) RSC 1
- Lost to Peter Konyegwachie (Nigeria) 0-5
