= Lee Jae-hyuk =

South Korean boxer (born 1969)

Medal record

Men's boxing

Representing South Korea

Olympic Games
Bronze medal – third place	1988 Seoul	Featherweight

Lee Jae-Hyuk (Korean: 이재혁; Hanja: 李在赫; born May 20, 1969, in Andong, North Gyeongsang Province, South Korea) is a retired South Korean amateur boxer.

== Career ==
Lee won a bronze medal in the men's featherweight (57 kg) division at the 1988 Summer Olympics in Seoul. In the tournament, he beat future WBC Lightweight champion Miguel Ángel González and future World Amateur Championship gold medalist Kirkor Kirkorov by unanimous decision.

== Results ==
1988 Summer Olympics
Event	Round	Result	Opponent	Score
Featherweight	First	Win	(Mexico) Miguel Ángel González	5-0
Featherweight	Second	Win	(Australia) Darren Hiles	3-2
Featherweight	Third	Win	(Bulgaria) Kirkor Kirkorov	5-0
Featherweight	Quarterfinal	Win	(Poland) Tomasz Nowak	5-0
Featherweight	Semifinal	Loss	(Romania) Daniel Dumitrescu	0-5
