= John Frank =

John Frank may refer to:

- John Frank (epidemiologist) (born 1949), Canadian epidemiologist
- John B. Frank (born 1956), managing principal of Oaktree Capital Management
- John Frank (tight end) (born 1962), American football player
- John G. Frank (1831–?), Wisconsin legislator
- John Paul Frank (1917–2002), American lawyer and scholar
- John Frank (defensive end) (born 1974), gridiron football player

== See also ==
- John "Johnny" Franck (born 1990), American musician
- John Francis (disambiguation)
- John Franks (disambiguation)
