= Abdelhak Achik =

Moroccan boxer (born 1959)

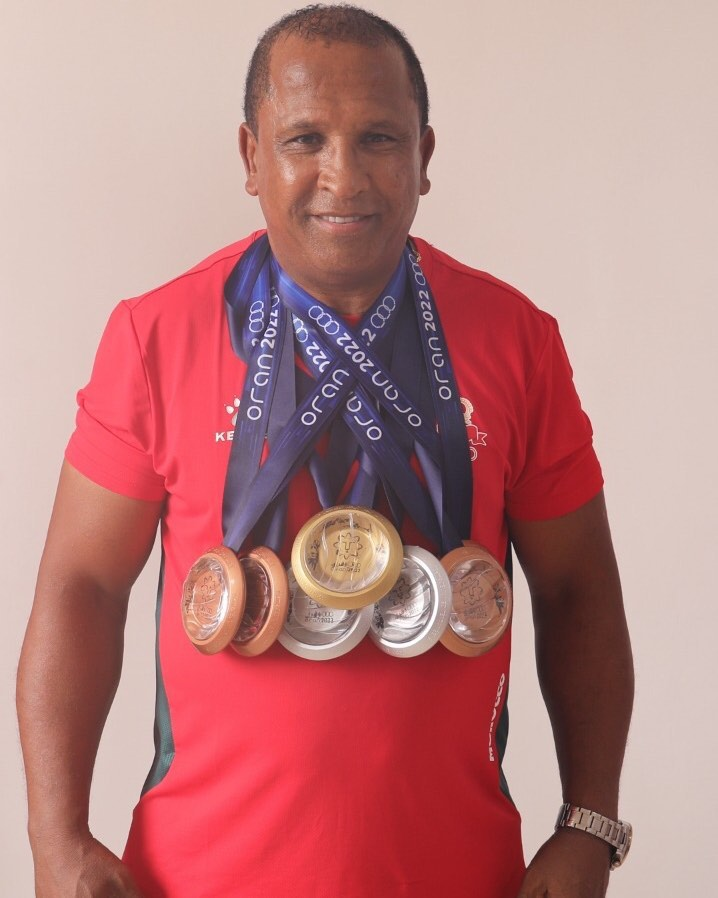

Personal information
- Born: March 11, 1959 (age 67) Casablanca, Morocco
Medal record
Men's Boxing
Representing Morocco
Olympic Games
Bronze medal – third place	1988 Seoul	Featherweight
Mediterranean Games
Gold medal – first place	1983 Casablanca	Bantamweight
Gold medal – first place	1987 Latakia	Featherweight

Abdelhak Achik (born March 11, 1959) is a former Moroccan amateur boxer, who won the bronze medal in the men's featherweight (– 57 kg) category at the 1988 Summer Olympics in Seoul.

== 1988 Olympic results ==
Below is the record of Abdelhak Achik, a Moroccan featherweight boxer who competed at the 1988 Seoul Olympics:

- Round of 64: bye
- Round of 32: Defeated Francisco Avelar (El Salvador) by decision, 4-1
- Round of 16: Defeated Omar Catari (Venezuela) KO 1
- Quarterfinal: Defeated Liu Dong (China) KO 1
- Semifinal: Lost to Giovanni Parisi (Italy) referee stopped contest in the first round (was awarded bronze medal)
