= Charles Lubulwa =

Ugandan boxer

Personal information
- Nationality: Ugandan
- Born: 28 December 1964 (age 60); Naguru, Uganda

Sport
- Sport: Boxing

Charles Lubulwa (born 28 December 1964) is a Ugandan former boxer. He competed at the 1980 Summer Olympics where he became the youngest Ugandan athlete to have competed at an Olympic Games, suffering a first round defeat. He also fought in the 1984 Summer Olympics, reaching the quarter-finals, and the 1988 Summer Olympics.

== Early life ==
Lubulwa was born in the city of Naguru in Uganda. He attended St Judes Primary School where he took up boxing, initially in secret, against his father's wishes. Two of Lubulwa's brothers, Fred Mutuweta and Robin Lukanga, also became boxers. He qualified for the 1977 national championships but his father transferred Lubulwa to a new school, St Charles Lwanga, for his O-levels. The move was also designed to move Lubulwa out of boxing but he kept training in private as the school had no suitable facilities.

Lubwula's former coach, Fred Genza, approached the school in a bid to allow Lubwula to compete in a national boxing event. The school's headmaster agreed and Lubwula travelled to Kampala, living with Genza to conceal his entry into the competition from his father. He won a silver medal in the novice category. When he returned to his school he found that the other children had been following his progress and such was the interest in the sport, the school soon introduced its own boxing program.

== Career ==
Lubulwa's performances attracted the attention of Grace Sseruwagi, the head coach of the nations boxing team. Sseruwagi selected Lubwula in his squad to compete in the 1980 Summer Olympics in Moscow. Aged 15 years and 206 days at the start of the competition, Lubulwa remains the youngest Ugandan athlete to have competed at an Olympic Games. After receiving a bye through his first round, Lubulwa faced Hungarian György Gedó. His opponent was considerably more experienced; Gedó was competing in his fourth Olympic Games and had won gold at the 1972 Summer Olympics. Gedó defeated Lubulwa by TKO in the first round of the bout.

Lubulwa was selected by Sseruwagi again for the 1982 Commonwealth Games in Brisbane, Australia. He reached the quarter-finals of the competition before being defeated. He retained his place in the Ugandan squad for the 1984 Summer Olympics in Los Angeles, United States. In the first round Lubulwa claimed his first Olympic victory by defeating Australian Shane Knox on points. Further victories over Dieudonné Mzatsi and Paul Fitzgerald advanced Lubulwa to the quarter-final. He was defeated by Nigerian Peter Konyegwachie who went on to win the silver medal.

In 1985, Lubulwa won a gold medal at a boxing tournament in Germany only for his medal to be lost the following year. Lubulwa had loaned the medal to a government official who took the medal to the Parliament of Uganda to help him gain recognition for his achievements. However, the medal was lost during a panic following a rumour of the approach of the National Resistance Army.

Lubulwa was selected to compete in the 1988 Summer Olympics in Seoul, South Korea, his third Olympic Games. He was selected as captain of the Ugandan squad for the Games, which also featured his brother Fred Mutuweta. Lubulwa was defeated in the first round by Blessing Onoko of Nigeria after the referee stopped the bout in the third round. The pair also entered the 1990 Commonwealth Games in Auckland, New Zealand. Lubulwa was forced to pull out of the competition after contracting Malaria just days before the start of the Games. The disappointment ultimately led to Lubulwa's retirement from the sport.

== Later life ==
After retiring from boxing, Lubulwa took up coaching the sport and became the Head coach of the Kampala Capital City Authority Boxing Club.
