= Steven Frank =

Steven Frank may refer to:

- Steven Frank (biologist) (born 1957), evolutionary theorist
- Steve Frank (boxer) (born 1965), Guyanese Olympic boxer
- Steve Frank (soccer) (1948–2024), American soccer midfielder
- Steve Frank (American football) (born 1950), American football player and coach

== See also ==
- Steve Franks, American screenwriter
- Stephen Franks (born 1950), New Zealand lawyer
