= Tomasz Nowak =

Tomasz Nowak can refer to:

- Tomasz Nowak (politician) (born 1956), a Polish politician
- Tomasz Nowak (boxer) (1960-2013), a Polish boxer
- Tomasz Nowak (footballer) (born 1985), a Polish footballer
