= Emilio Villegas =

Dominican Republic boxer (born 1968)

Personal information
- Nationality: Dominican
- Born: 23 September 1968 (age 57)

Sport
- Sport: Boxing
Medal record
Men's amateur boxing
Representing Dominican Republic
Pan American Games
| Silver medal – second place | 1987 Indianapolis | Featherweight |

Emilio Villegas (born 23 September 1968) is a Dominican Republic boxer. He competed in the men's featherweight event at the 1988 Summer Olympics, losing to Paul Fitzgerald of Ireland. He also won a silver medal in the featherweight event at the 1987 Pan American Games.
