= Jacobin Yoma =

French Guianan former boxer (born 1966)

Personal information
- Nickname: l'Ouragan de Cayenne
- Nationality: (French Guiana) French Guianan
- Born: 6 October 1966 (age 59) Maripasoula, French Guiana
- Height: 5 ft 5 1/2 in (166 cm)
- Weight: Super-featherweight

Boxing career
- Stance: Orthodox

Boxing record
- Total fights: 54
- Wins: 40
- Win by KO: 21
- Losses: 11
- Draws: 1

Jacobin Yoma (born 6 October 1966) is a French Guianan former professional boxer who competed from 1989 to 1999, and held the European super-featherweight title from 1993 to 1995.

He was nicknamed l'Ouragan de Cayenne (The Cayenne Hurricane) for the impressive speed of his hands.

== Early life ==
Yoma was born on 6 October 1966 in Maripasoula, French Guiana, as a member of the Aluku tribe, but settled in the capital city of Cayenne at a young age. At the age of 13 he was diagnosed with a heart murmur and began boxing when he was advised to pick up a sport. He became French amateur champion in 1989 under coach Jacques Chinon and decided to go pro later that year.

== Professional career ==
Yoma made his professional debut on 6 October 1989, defeating Brazilian opponent Geraldo Leite by points in Cayenne. In his fifth bout, he traveled to the United States and fought Regilio Tuur to a majority draw – the first blemish on his record and the first matchup in their trilogy. In the next year, he picked up both the French and WBC FECARBOX super-featherweight titles as he continued to rack up wins. On 14 June 1991 he faced a 37-year-old Daniel Londas for his European super-featherweight title in Reims, and suffered his first career defeat by decisive unanimous decision (UD). Yoma again captured the French and FECARBOX titles before he received another shot at the European crown in Rotterdam on 3 December 1992, falling to Regilio Tuur by way of points in front of a crowd of 7,000 that included John de Wolf and Jules Deelder. Four months later he lost a decision to Guyanese prospect Joseph Murray in Georgetown for the vacant FECARBOX title – his third defeat.

He finally defeated Tuur on 11 June 1993 by split decision in his hometown of Cayenne to become European super-featherweight champion. Over the next two years he successfully defended the European belt on four occasions, with the first three taking place in the hot humidity of Cayenne. His last successful defense was a UD victory over former world champion Jimmi Bredahl in Copenhagen on 7 October 1994. He lost the title on 4 July 1995, suffering a UD defeat in the Paris suburb of Thiais to Russian future world champion Anatoly Alexandrov. Yoma captured the French title once more the following year before retiring in 1999 with a record of 40–11–3.

== Professional boxing record ==
54 fights	40 wins	11 losses
By knockout	21	1
By decision	19	10
Draws	3	

No.	Result	Record	Opponent	Type	Round, time	Date	Location	Notes
54	Loss	40–11–3	(France) Didier Tual	PTS	8	26 Jun 1999	Reims, France	
53	Win	40–10–3	(France) Franck Requier	PTS	8	28 May 1999	Saint-Lô, France	
52	Loss	39–10–3	(Romania) Adrian Parlogea	PTS	8	6 Mar 1999	Saint-Quentin, France	
51	Win	39–9–3	(Barbados) Lennox Jones	PTS	8	9 Jan 1999	Ducos, Martinique	
50	Loss	38–9–3	(Algeria) Affif Djelti	PTS	10	28 Mar 1998	Cayenne, French Guiana	For French super-featherweight title
49	Loss	38–8–3	(Algeria) Affif Djelti	PTS	10	7 Jun 1997	Le Havre, France	Lost French super-featherweight title
48	Win	38–7–3	(Algeria) Hocine Hassani	PTS	10	1 Mar 1997	Cayenne, French Guiana	
47	Loss	37–7–3	(Burkina Faso) Dramane Nabaloum	PTS	8	10 Dec 1996	Ouagadougou, Burkina Faso	
46	Win	37–6–3	(Dominican Republic) Víctor Torres	RTD	6 (?)	9 Nov 1996	Cayenne, French Guiana	
45	Win	36–6–3	(Algeria) Affif Djelti	TKO	1 (10)	29 Jun 1996	Saint-Laurent-du-Maroni, French Guiana	Won French super-featherweight title
44	Win	35–6–3	(Dominican Republic) Radames Bido	TKO	1 (?)	12 Apr 1996	Cayenne, French Guiana	
43	Loss	34–6–3	(Algeria) Affif Djelti	TKO	6 (?)	15 Dec 1995	Rouen, France	
42	Win	34–5–3	(Brazil) Luiz Ferreira	RTD	3 (?)	10 Nov 1995	Cayenne, French Guiana	
41	Loss	33–5–3	(Russia) Anatoly Alexandrov	UD	12	4 Jul 1995	Thiais, France	Lost European super-featherweight title
40	Win	33–4–3	(United States) Joey Negron	PTS	8	14 Feb 1995	Thiais, France	
39	Win	32–4–3	(Algeria) Hocine Hassani	MD	8	4 Dec 1994	Palais Omnisports de Thiais, Thiais, France	
38	Win	31–4–3	(Denmark) Jimmi Bredahl	UD	12	7 Oct 1994	K.B. Hallen, Copenhagen, Denmark	Retained European super-featherweight title
37	Loss	30–4–3	(Trinidad and Tobago) Alric Johnson	PTS	10	11 Jun 1994	Pointe-à-Pitre, Guadeloupe	
36	Draw	30–3–3	(Burkina Faso) Dramane Nabaloum	PTS	8	3 Jun 1994	Abidjan, Ivory Coast	
35	Win	30–3–2	(United Kingdom) Neil Haddock	RTD	6 (12)	14 May 1994	Cayenne, French Guiana	Retained European super-featherweight title
34	Win	29–3–2	(Puerto Rico) Víctor Laureano	PTS	8	8 Apr 1994	Cayenne, French Guiana	
33	Win	28–3–2	(Lithuania) Rimvydas Bilius	TKO	8 (12)	28 Jan 1994	Cayenne, French Guiana	Retained European super-featherweight title
32	Win	27–3–2	(Brazil) Arao Macedo	PTS	10	5 Nov 1993	Cayenne, French Guiana	
31	Win	26–3–2	(France) Areski Bakir	TKO	8 (12)	2 Oct 1993	Cayenne, French Guiana	Retained European super-featherweight title
30	Win	25–3–2	(Netherlands) Regilio Tuur	SD	12	11 Jun 1993	Cayenne, French Guiana	Won European super-featherweight title
29	Loss	24–3–2	(Guyana) Joseph Murray	UD	12	18 Apr 1993	National Sports Hall, Georgetown, Guyana	For vacant WBC FECARBOX super-featherweight title
28	Draw	24–2–2	(Tunisia) Kamel Bou Ali	MD	8	6 Feb 1993	Cirque d'hiver, Paris, France	
27	Loss	24–2–1	(Netherlands) Regilio Tuur	PTS	12	3 Dec 1992	Sportpaleis Ahoy, Rotterdam, Netherlands	For vacant European super-featherweight title
26	Win	24–1–1	(Dominican Republic) Danilo Cabrera	KO	6 (?)	30 Oct 1992	Cayenne, French Guiana	
25	Win	23–1–1	Hector Padilla	TKO	4 (?)	4 Jul 1992	Lamentin, Guadeloupe	
24	Win	22–1–1	(Algeria) Hocine Hassani	RTD	6 (10)	12 Jun 1992	Cayenne, French Guiana	Won vacant French super-featherweight title
23	Win	21–1–1	(France) Jean Pierre Dibateza	PTS	10	15 May 1992	Cayenne, French Guiana	
22	Win	20–1–1	(France) Alain Pernice	PTS	8	3 Apr 1992	Clermont-Ferrand, France	
21	Win	19–1–1	(United States) Bobby Brewer	PTS	8	27 Feb 1992	Paris, France	
20	Win	18–1–1	(Mali) Moussa Sangare	MD	8	30 Jan 1992	Paris, France	
19	Win	17–1–1	(Colombia) Wilson Fontalvo	RTD	6 (12), 3:00	17 Jan 1992	Cayenne, French Guiana	Won vacant WBC FECARBOX super-featherweight title
18	Win	16–1–1	(Barbados) Ed Pollard	TKO	3 (?)	30 Nov 1991	Pointe-à-Pitre, Guadeloupe	
17	Win	15–1–1	(France) Alain Simoes	PTS	8	25 Oct 1991	Cayenne, French Guiana	
16	Loss	14–1–1	(France) Daniel Londas	UD	12	14 Jun 1991	Reims, France	For European super-featherweight title
15	Win	14–0–1	(Dominican Republic) Rodolfo Chirino	RTD	8 (12)	4 May 1991	Cayenne, French Guiana	Retained WBC FECARBOX super-featherweight title
14	Win	13–0–1	(Guyana) Junior Drakes	TKO	1 (?)	27 Mar 1991	Cayenne, French Guiana	
13	Win	12–0–1	(Venezuela) Luis Rodríguez	KO	2 (8)	23 Feb 1991	Stade du Futbol, Pointe-à-Pitre, Guadeloupe	
12	Win	11–0–1	(Dominican Republic) Christino Suero	KO	5 (12), 1:09	18 Jan 1991	National Hall of Sports, Cayenne, French Guiana	Won vacant WBC FECARBOX super-featherweight title
11	Win	10–0–1	(United States) Jesse Torres	PTS	10	7 Dec 1990	Sports Hall, Cayenne, French Guiana	
10	Win	9–0–1	(United States) Curtis Strong	PTS	8	3 Nov 1990	Deauville, France	
9	Win	8–0–1	(Republic of Ireland) Richie Foster	KO	4 (?)	12 Oct 1990	Cayenne, French Guiana	
8	Win	7–0–1	(France) Mohammed Bennama	RTD	9 (10)	18 May 1990	Cayenne, French Guiana	Won vacant French super-featherweight title
7	Win	6–0–1	(France) Pierre Lorcy	PTS	10	6 Apr 1990	Cayenne, French Guiana	
6	Win	5–0–1	(United States) Lloyd Ratalsky	KO	4 (?)	16 Mar 1990	Sports Hall, Cayenne, French Guiana	
5	Draw	4–0–1	(Netherlands) Regilio Tuur	MD	6	12 Feb 1990	(United States) Westchester County Center, White Plains, New York, U.S.	
4	Win	4–0	(Algeria) Belaid Khaldi	TKO	1 (?)	19 Jan 1990	Cayenne, French Guiana	
3	Win	3–0	(United States) Jose Gonzales	RTD	3 (?), 3:00	8 Dec 1989	Sports Hall, Cayenne, French Guiana	
2	Win	2–0	(Puerto Rico) Silverio Flores	PTS	6	10 Nov 1989	Cayenne, French Guiana	
1	Win	1–0	(Brazil) Geraldo Leite	PTS	6	6 Oct 1989	Cayenne, French Guiana	

== Personal life ==
Yoma is a member of the Aluku tribe, descendants of the Maroon slaves who fled from the plantations of Dutch Guiana in the eighteenth century.

In 2009, he was handed a six-month suspended prison sentence in a Cayenne courtroom for driving under the influence and causing an accident that injured several people.

In 2015 the Salle de Boxe Jacques Chinon et Jacobin Yoma, named after Yoma and his former coach, was inaugurated in Cayenne.
