= László Szőke (boxer) =

Hungarian boxer (born 1966)

Personal information
- Nationality: Hungarian
- Born: 21 August 1966 (age 58); Budapest, Hungary

Sport
- Sport: Boxing

László Szőke (born 21 August 1966) is a Hungarian boxer. He competed in the men's featherweight event at the 1988 Summer Olympics. At the 1988 Summer Olympics, he lost to John Wanjau of Kenya.
