= Anatoly Alexandrov (boxer) =

Russian boxer (born 1967)

Anatoly Alexandrov Анатолий Ильич Александров
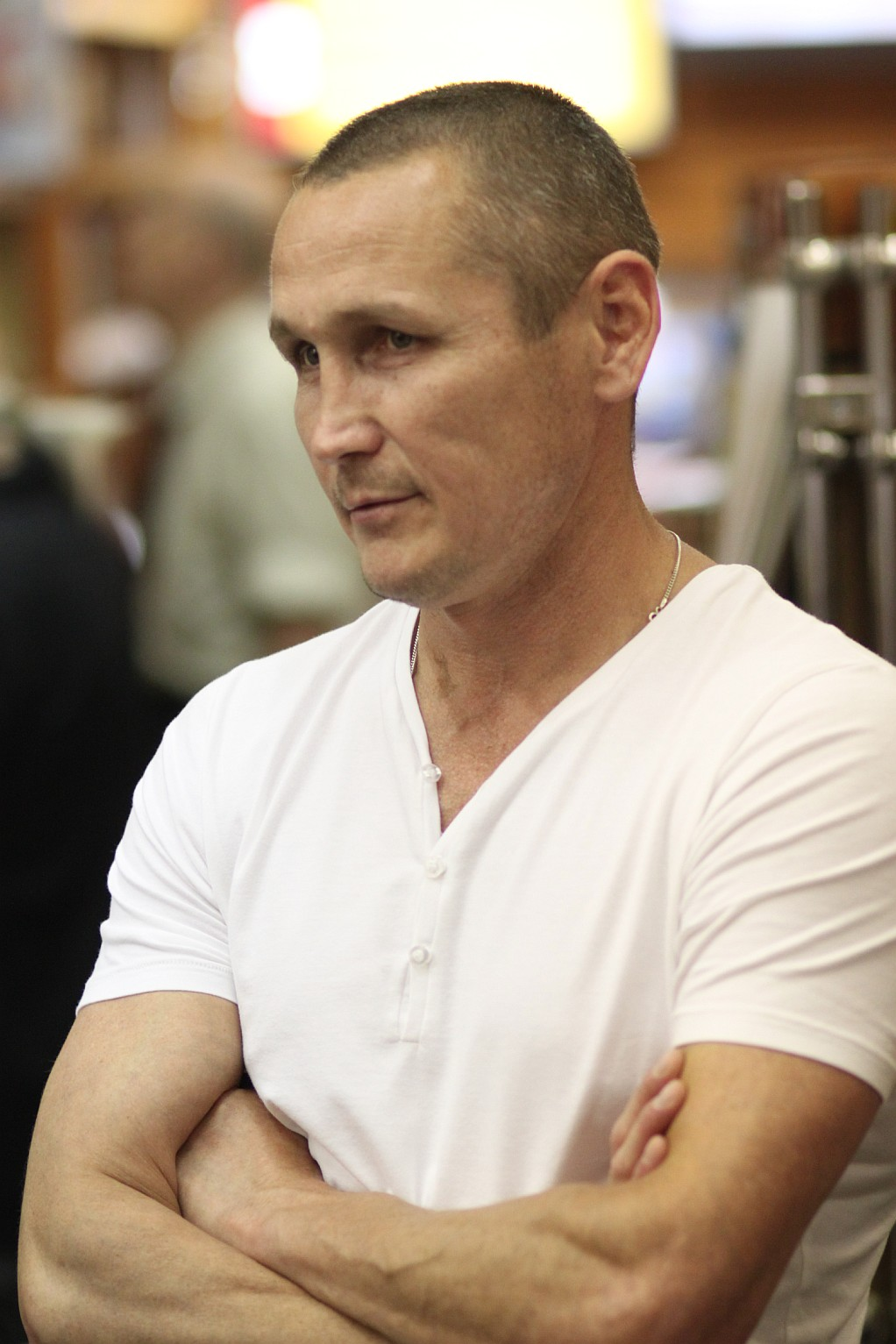
- Anatoly Alexandrov

Personal information
- Nationality: Russian
- Born: February 3, 1967 (age 59) Shakhtinsk, Kazakh SSR
- Height: 5 ft 6 in (168 cm)
- Weight: Super featherweight

Boxing career
- Stance: Orthodox

Boxing record
- Total fights: 43
- Wins: 37
- Win by KO: 15
- Losses: 6

Anatoly Alexandrov (Russian: Анатолий Ильич Александров; born February 3, 1967), is a Russian former professional boxer who competed from 1990 to 2001. He held the WBO super featherweight title from 1998 to 1999.

== Professional career ==
Alexandrov turned professional in 1990 & amassed a record of 32-4 before beating French boxer Julien Lorcy & winning the vacant WBO super featherweight world title. He would go on to lose the title in his second defense against Brazilian contender Acelino Freitas.

== Professional boxing record ==
43 fights	37 wins	6 losses
By knockout	15	2
By decision	22	4

No.	Result	Record	Opponent	Type	Round, time	Date	Location	Notes
43	Loss	37–6	Tontcho Tontchev	TKO	1 (12)	2001-01-20	York Hall, London, England, U.K.	For EBU super featherweight title
42	Win	37–5	Pedro Garcia	PTS	8 (8)	2000-05-25	Elancourt, France	
41	Win	36–5	Kamel Ikene	TKO	4 (?)	2000-01-31	Paris, France	
40	Loss	35–5	Acelino Freitas	KO	1 (12)	1999-08-07	La Palestre, Le Cannet, France	Lost WBO super featherweight title
39	Win	35–4	Arnulfo Castillo	TKO	8 (12)	1999-01-25	Palais des Sports Porte de Versailles, Paris, France	Retained WBO super featherweight title
38	Win	34–4	Pedro Ferradas	TKO	12 (12)	1998-09-01	Vigo, Spain	Retained EBU super featherweight title
37	Win	33–4	Julien Lorcy	MD	12 (12)	1998-05-16	Palais Omnisport de Paris-Bercy, Paris, France	Won vacant WBO super featherweight title
36	Win	32–4	Djamel Lifa	PTS	12 (12)	1998-02-21	Palais Omnisport de Paris-Bercy, Paris, France	Won EBU super featherweight title
35	Win	31–4	Maxim Pugachev	TKO	4 (8)	1997-09-27	Circus, Moscow, Russia	
34	Loss	30–4	Genaro Hernández	SD	12 (12)	14 Jun 1997	Alamodome, San Antonio, Texas, U.S.	For WBC super featherweight title
33	Win	30–3	Joseph Figueroa	PTS	8 (8)	1997-02-22	Convention Hall, Atlantic City, New Jersey, U.S.	
32	Win	29–3	Karl Taylor	TKO	7 (8)	1996-12-20	Bilbao, Spain	
31	Win	28–3	Pedro Ferradas	TKO	10 (12)	1996-09-17	O Porriño, Spain	Retained EBU super featherweight title
30	Win	27–3	Didier Schaeffer	PTS	12 (12)	1996-03-23	Grande-Synthe, France	Retained EBU super featherweight title
29	Win	26–3	Djamel Lifa	PTS	12 (12)	1996-02-03	Palais des sports Marcel-Cerdan, Paris, France	Retained EBU super featherweight title
28	Win	25–3	Rolando Gamboa	TKO	3 (8)	1995-11-03	Saint Petersburg, Russia	
27	Win	24–3	Jacobin Yoma	UD	12 (12)	1995-07-04	Thiais, France	Won EBU super featherweight title
26	Win	23–3	Hocine Hassani	PTS	8 (8)	1995-02-14	Thiais, France	
25	Win	22–3	Yuri Balagurov	TKO	3 (8)	1994-08-18	Shymkent, Kazakhstan	
24	Win	21–3	Joseph Murray	KO	2 (12)	1994-05-07	Sports Palace, Perm, Russia	Retained WBC International super featherweight title
23	Win	20–3	Vladimir Kryuchkov	PTS	8 (8)	1994-04-21	Saint Petersburg, Russia	
22	Win	19–3	November Ntshingila	UD	12 (12)	1994-01-26	Indoor Centre, Springs, South Africa	Won WBC International super featherweight title
21	Win	18–3	Roberto Granciosa	UD	10 (10)	1993-11-11	Sheraton Waikiki Hotel, Honolulu, Hawaii, U.S.	
20	Win	17–3	November Ntshingila	UD	8 (8)	1993-07-16	CSKA, Moscow, Russia	
19	Win	16–3	Serik Atabayev	TKO	4 (?)	1993-06-12	Karaganda, Kazakhstan	
18	Win	15–3	Valery Blagodarny	PTS	8 (8)	1992-10-25	Grozny, Russia	
17	Loss	14–3	Felix Garcia Losada	PTS	8 (8)	1992-07-17	Salamanca, Spain	
16	Win	14–2	Vladimir Alexandrov	PTS	10 (10)	1992-05-26	Kropyvnytskyi, Ukraine	
15	Win	13–2	Yuri Alexandrov	RTD	8 (10)	1992-04-17	Simferopol, Ukraine	Won CISBB super featherweight title
14	Win	12–2	Temirzhan Kurkembayev	PTS	8 (8)	1992-01-25	Moscow, Russia	
13	Loss	11–2	Vadim Prisyazhnyuk	PTS	10 (10)	1991-12-21	Kostanay, Soviet Union	
12	Win	11–1	Ibrahim Hairulov	PTS	8 (8)	1991-11-08	Arkhangelsk, Soviet Union	
11	Loss	10–1	Rimvydas Bilius	PTS	6 (6)	1991-10-06	Baku, Soviet Union	
10	Win	10–0	Vladimir Mikhailov	PTS	8 (8)	1991-10-02	Baku, Soviet Union	
9	Win	9–0	Vitali Kayakhov	TKO	3 (?)	1991-09-01	Karaganda, Soviet Union	
8	Win	8–0	Hvicha Hdrian	TKO	7 (?)	1991-07-28	Ashgabat, Soviet Union	
7	Win	7–0	Sergey Chaplygin	TKO	6 (?)	1991-04-20	Sports Complex Irtysh, Omsk, Soviet Union	
6	Win	6–0	Talgat Tusupov	PTS	8 (8)	1991-03-18	Barnaul, Soviet Union	
5	Win	5–0	Valery Blagodarny	TKO	5 (?)	1991-02-24	Grozny, Soviet Union	
4	Win	4–0	Serhiy Sukhodoyev	PTS	8 (8)	1991-02-03	Riga, Soviet Union	
3	Win	3–0	Alexander Ageev	PTS	6 (6)	1990-12-28	Riga, Soviet Union	
2	Win	2–0	Hvicha Hdrian	PTS	6 (6)	1990-12-01	Barnaul, Soviet Union	
1	Win	1–0	Nikolai Dolmatov	PTS	4 (4)	1990-09-29	Rostov-na-Donu, Soviet Union	

== See also ==
- List of world super-featherweight boxing champions

Sporting positions
Regional boxing titles
Preceded by Jacobin Yoma	EBU Super featherweight champion July 4, 1995 – 1996; Vacated	Vacant Title next held by Julien Lorcy
Preceded by Djamel Lifa	EBU Super featherweight champion February 21, 1998 – 1998; Vacated	Vacant Title next held by Dennis Holbæk Pedersen
World boxing titles
Vacant Title last held by Barry Jones	WBO super featherweight champion May 16, 1998 – August 7, 1999	Succeeded by Acelino Freitas
