= Ali Çelikiz =

Turkish boxer

Personal information
- Nationality: Turkish
- Born: 31 August 1963 (age 61)

Sport
- Sport: Boxing

Ali Çelikiz (born 31 August 1963) is a Turkish boxer. He competed in the men's featherweight event at the 1988 Summer Olympics. At the 1988 Summer Olympics, he lost to Darrell Hiles of Australia.
