= Tony Pep =

Canadian boxer

Personal information
- Born: September 14, 1964 (age 61) New Westminster, British Columbia, Canada
- Height: 6 ft 1.5 in (187 cm)
- Weight: Featherweight; Super featherweight; Lightweight

Boxing career
- Stance: Orthodox stance

Boxing record
- Total fights: 53
- Wins: 42
- Win by KO: 22
- Losses: 10
- Draws: 1

Tony Pep (born September 14, 1964) is a Canadian former professional boxer. He has a record of 42 wins (22 of which were by knockout), 10 losses, and 1 draw.

== Early life ==
Pep grew up in east Vancouver. When Pep was 11 years old his mother died from an overdose of drugs. Pep never met his father and was put in several group homes.

== Boxing career ==
During his career, Pep held the Commonwealth super featherweight title, the IBO lightweight title and the Canadian lightweight and featherweight titles. In December 1985 Pep defeated Ian Clyde to win the Canadian featherweight championship. In February 1992 Pep defeated Paul Harvey to win the Commonwealth super featherweight title. He made an unsuccessful bid for the WBO super featherweight title, losing a 12-round unanimous decision to Regilio Tuur on March 9, 1995. In September of 1995 Pep lost the Commonwealth super featherweight title to Justin Juuko.

In March 1996 Pep defeated Johar Abu Lashin to win the vacant IBO lightweight title. In December 1996 Pep defeated Louie Espinoza to retain his IBO title. On June 14, 1998, Tony Pep fought a 16-0 Floyd Mayweather Jr. and lost by unanimous decision. In September 2000 Pep defeated Mario Lechowski to win the Canadian lightweight championship. In March 2001 Pep lost to Ricky Hatton in a bout for the vacant WBU Super Lightweight title. In September 2001 Pep lost his Canadian lightweight title in a rematch against Mario Lechowski.

== Professional boxing record ==
All information in this section is derived from BoxRec, unless otherwise stated.

53 fights	42 wins	10 losses
By knockout	22	2
By decision	20	8
Draws	1	

No.	Result	Record	Opponent	Type	Round, time	Date	Location	More
