= Anthony Konyegwachie =

Nigerian boxer

Personal information
- Nationality: Nigerian
- Born: 10 May 1970 (age 54)

Sport
- Sport: Boxing

Anthony Konyegwachie (born 10 May 1970) is a Nigerian boxer. He competed in the men's featherweight event at the 1988 Summer Olympics. At the 1988 Summer Olympics, he lost to Daniel Dumitrescu of Romania.
