= Wataru Yamada =

Japanese boxer

Personal information
- Nationality: Japanese
- Born: 10 December 1966 (age 58)

Sport
- Sport: Boxing

Wataru Yamada (山田 渉, Yamada Wataru, born 10 December 1966) is a Japanese boxer. He competed in the men's featherweight event at the 1988 Summer Olympics.
