= Koos Maasdijk =

Dutch rower (born 1968)

Medal record

Men's rowing

Representing the Netherlands

Olympic Games
| Gold medal – first place | 1996 Atlanta | Eight |

Jacob "Koos" Arnold Maasdijk (born 19 September 1968 in Rotterdam, South Holland) is a former rower from the Netherlands, who won the gold medal with the men's eights at the 1996 Summer Olympics in Atlanta, Georgia. He had also competed at the 1992 Summer Olympics, finishing fifth in the men's fours.

Awards
| Preceded by None | Rotterdam Sportsman of the Year; 1986 | Succeeded by Pieter Slot |
| Preceded by Regilio Tuur | Rotterdam Sportsman of the Year; 1989 | Succeeded by Robert Eenhoorn |
| Preceded by Regilio Tuur | Rotterdam Sportsman of the Year; 1996 | Succeeded by Don Diego Poeder |
