= Robert Eenhoorn =

Dutch baseball player (born 1968)

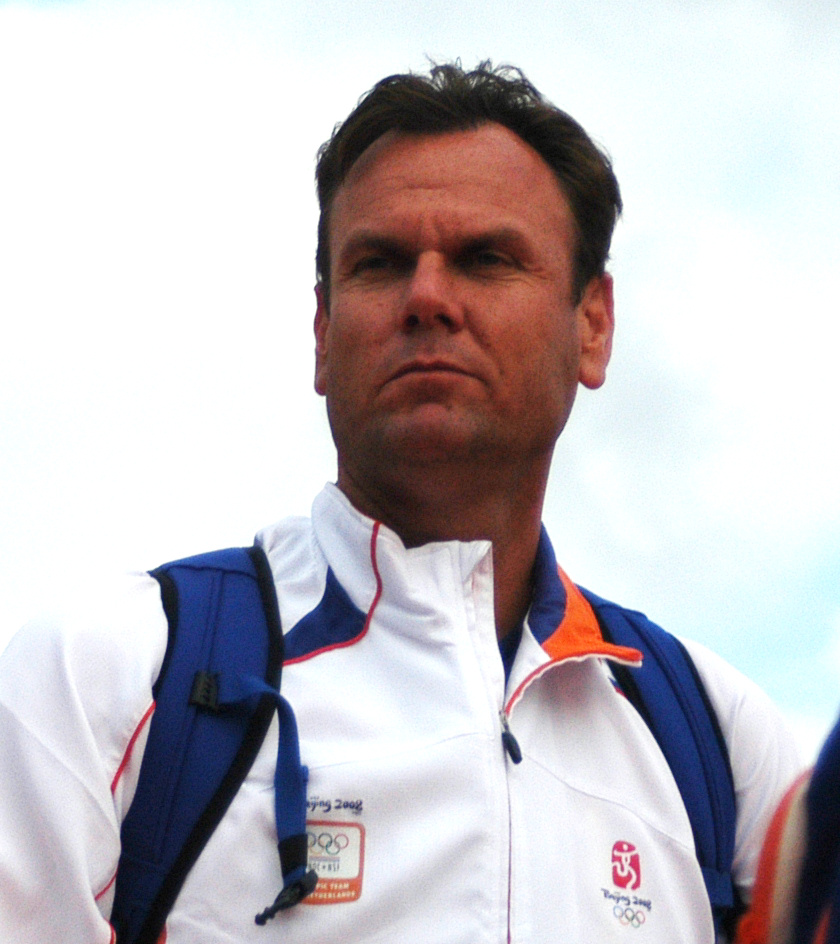
- Robert Eenhoorn in 2007
- Second baseman/Shortstop
- Born: February 9, 1968 (age 58); Rotterdam, Netherlands
- Batted: Right Threw: Right

MLB debut
- April 27, 1994, for the New York Yankees

Last MLB appearance
- September 28, 1997, for the Anaheim Angels

MLB statistics
- Batting average: .239
- Home runs: 1
- Runs batted in: 10
- Stats at Baseball Reference

Teams
- As player: New York Yankees (1994–1996); California/Anaheim Angels (1996–1997); As manager: Netherlands (2001–2008)

Member of the Netherlands

Baseball Hall of Fame
- Induction: 2018

Robert Franciscus Eenhoorn (born February 9, 1968) is a Dutch former professional baseball player and manager. He played four seasons of Major League Baseball as a utility infielder for the New York Yankees and California/Anaheim Angels. On September 27, 1997, Eenhoorn became the first Dutch-born player to hit a home run in the major leagues since Jack Lelivelt in 1912. (Many other Dutch MLB players to have hit home runs were born elsewhere, mainly in the Netherlands Antilles, including Andruw Jones, Xander Bogaerts, and Ozzie Albies.)

From 2009 to 2014, Eenhoorn served as the technical director for the Netherlands national baseball team.

From 2014 to 2024, Eenhoorn was the general director of the Dutch football club AZ Alkmaar. In March 2015, he hired another former major leaguer, Billy Beane, as an advisor.

== Early life ==
Eenhoorn was born in Rotterdam, Netherlands. His father played baseball during World War II as an act of Dutch rebellion against the German occupation. Eenhoorn played association football and baseball growing up and credited his football play with helping his footwork on the baseball diamond.

== Dutch baseball career ==
Eenhoorn played for Neptunus and Haarlem Nicols in the Dutch Honkbal Hoofdklasse, the top baseball league in the Netherlands, from 1984 through 1990. He won the Ron Fraser Award as the top Dutch youth player in 1984.

Eenhoorn also played on the Netherlands national team that won the 1987 European Baseball Championship. He also played for the Dutch team in the 1988 Seoul Olympics and the 1988 Baseball World Cup, slashing .256/.283/.395 with a .887 fielding percentage, committing 8 errors in 11 games at shortstop. He also was on the Dutch roster for the team that won the 1999 European Championship.

== American baseball career ==
Eenhoorn was named the third-team All-American shortstop by Baseball America in 1990 while attending Davidson College in North Carolina. The New York Yankees drafted Eenhoorn in the second round (45th overall) of the 1990 Major League Baseball draft, with a compensation pick obtained for the loss of free agent Walt Terrell to the Pittsburgh Pirates.

Eenhoorn began his professional career with the pennant-winning Class-A Oneonta Yankees in the New York–Penn League and hit .268/.324/.355. He stole 11 bases in 15 attempts. He was voted to the league's All-Star team as a utility infielder and was labeled a "defensive genius" by Baseball America. He led league shortstops in fielding percentage (.960). According to Baseball America, he was the top prospect in the league.

In 1991, Eenhoorn hit .350/.395/.575 for the Gulf Coast League Yankees and .241/.320/.343 for the Class-A Advanced Prince William Cannons. The next season, he batted .305/.370/.409 with the Class-A Advanced Fort Lauderdale Yankees and .235/.271/.327 for the Double-A Albany-Colonie Yankees after entering the season as the #6 prospect in the Yankees system according to Baseball America. He was downgraded to #7 after the year, behind Derek Jeter and ahead of Dave Silvestri among Yankees shortstops.

Eenhoorn batted .280/.324/.433 in 1993 with Albany-Colonie. He was the All-Star shortstop in the Eastern League. He was removed from the top Yankee prospect list after that year. Eenhoorn batted .239/.270/.324 for the Triple-A Columbus Clippers in 1994. He made his MLB debut on April 27, hitting a double and scoring a run. He appeared in two mid-May games. In three MLB games, all coming off the bench, he batted 2-for-4.

On May 28, 1995, Eenhoorn was the last player to start at shortstop for the Yankees before Jeter's debut. Due to Jeter's ascent, the Yankees shifted Eenhoorn to second base. He batted .252/.300/.352 in Triple-A that year and 2-for-14 in the majors. In 1996, he hit .337/.406/.448 for the International League-champion Clippers but only 1-for-14 in the major leagues.

The Yankees placed Eenhoorn on waivers in September 1996, and he was claimed by the Anaheim Angels. In 1997, he hit .308/.350/.473 for the Triple-A Vancouver Canadians. He was 7-for-20 with Anaheim, with his only MLB home run.

On April 14, 1998, Eenhoorn signed a minor-league contract with the New York Mets. In 94 games with the Norfolk Tides in the International League, he hit .233/.279/.352 with 7 home runs and 38 runs batted in.

== Managing career ==
Back in Rotterdam, Eenhoorn became player-manager of Neptunus in the Hoofdklasse. He ended his playing career in 2000, when he was named the most valuable player and best coach, the first person to win both awards in one season. Neptunus won the Hoofdklasse regular season and Holland Series three consecutive years from 1999 to 2001. The team also had international success when it won the World Port Tournament in 1999 and the European Cup in 2000 and 2001. In the 1999 World Port Tournament, Eenhoorn was named co-MVP with Ken Brauckmiller. Eenhoorn also played for the Netherlands national team at the 2000 Summer Olympics. He was not productive in those Olympics, going 3-for-26 with one walk. He was caught stealing in both of his attempts. Neptunus retired Eenhoorn's #16 in 2002.

Eenhoorn managed the Netherlands national team between 2001 and 2008, winning four consecutive European Baseball Championships and qualifying for the 2004 and 2008 Olympic Games. He retired to take up the position of technical director for the Dutch baseball federation, the KNBSB, similar to the position of general manager, succeeded by Rod Delmonico as manager. Eenhoorn left the national team in sixth place of the IBAF World Rankings.

Eenhoorn then set up the first baseball academy in Europe, Unicorns academy (Eenhoorn is Dutch for unicorn). The baseball academy model has been duplicated in other European countries and has led to a significant increase in the number of European players signing with MLB clubs.

== Personal life ==
Eenhoorn's son Ryan died at age 6 of a Wilms tumor in 2003. Eenhoorn and his wife have one other son.

On November 11, 2011, Eenhoorn was knighted on the order of Queen Beatrix, after he led the Dutch team to the 2011 Baseball World Cup title in his role as technical director. It was the first global baseball tournament won by the Netherlands. Also knighted were manager Brian Farley and catcher Sidney de Jong.

Awards
Preceded by Koos Maasdijk	Rotterdam Sportsman of the Year; 1990	Succeeded by Jeroen van Dijk
Preceded by Jeroen van Dijk	Rotterdam Sportsman of the Year; 1999	Succeeded by Raemon Sluiter
Preceded by Gerard Kemkers	Dutch Coach of the Year; 2007	Succeeded by Robin van Galen
