= Omar Catarí =

Venezuelan boxer (born 1964)

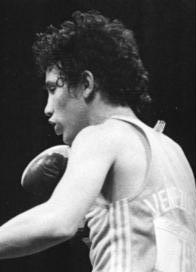

Medal record

Men's Boxing

Representing Venezuela

Olympic Games
Bronze medal – third place	1984 Los Angeles	Featherweight

Central American and Caribbean Games
Bronze medal – third place	1986 Santiago	Featherweight

Omar Catarí Peraza (born April 25, 1964 in Barquisimeto, Lara) is a former Venezuelan boxer. At the 1984 Summer Olympics he won the bronze medal in the men's featherweight division (– 57 kg), along with Türgüt Aykaç of Turkey.

== Olympic results ==
1984 – Los Angeles

- Round of 64 bye
- Round of 32: Defeated Azzedine Said (Algeria) referee stopped contest in second round
- Round of 16: Defeated Satoru Higashi (Japan) by decision, 4-1
- Quarterfinal: Defeated Park Hyung-Ok (South Korea) by decision, 4-1
- Semifinals: Lost to Meldrick Taylor (United States) by decision, 0-5 (was awarded bronze medal)

1988 – Seoul

- 1st round bye
- Defeated Moussa Kagambega (Burkina Faso) by first-round knockout
- Lost to Abdelhak Achik (Morocco) by first-round knockout
