= Barry Jones (boxer) =

Welsh boxer (born 1974)

Personal information
- Nationality: British
- Born: 3 May 1974 (age 52) Cardiff, Wales
- Height: 170 cm (5 ft 7 in)
- Weight: Super featherweight

Boxing career

Boxing record
- Total fights: 20
- Wins: 18
- Win by KO: 1
- Losses: 1
- Draws: 1
- No contests: 0

Barry Jones (born 3 May 1974) is a Welsh former professional boxer who competed from 1992 to 2000, and has since worked as a boxing analyst and commentator. He won the WBO super featherweight championship in 1997, but was stripped of the title when his license was revoked by the British Boxing Board of Control after an anomaly was discovered during a brain scan.

== Amateur career ==
Jones began boxing at the age of ten, during which he trained at Ray Thorogood's Highfields gym. He was a junior fighter of note, claiming a silver medal at European level as well as competing in the World Amateur Boxing Championships.

== Professional career ==
Jones turned professional in 1992 at the age of eighteen, and was trained by former British welterweight champion Pat Thomas.

Jones' first four professional fights were all held in his home city of Cardiff and all set for six rounds. Jones beat emerging fighter Con McMullen, before a victory over journeyman Miguel Matthews followed by wins over Mike Deveney and Greg Upton. He followed these fights with his first professional bouts outside Wales, beating first Colin MacAuley in Solihull in April 1993, then a points victory over John White in an undercard fight in the build up to the Nigel Benn vs. Chris Eubank II bout at the Old Trafford in October. In November 1993 he fought twice, beating Neil Swain at Ystrad Mynach and then Peter Buckley in Cardiff. He finished the year with another points victory, against Midlands fighter Elvis Parsley.

In January 1994, Jones beat Peter Buckley in Cardiff, his tenth straight professional win. His following bout against Kelton McKenzie was again on the undercard to another world title bout, Eubank's WBO super middleweight win over Sam Storey. Jones had three fights in 1995; the first on 25 May was his first ten-round bout, a points win over Justin Murphy in an eliminator for the British featherweight title. He completed the year with victories over Chris Jickells and Peter Buckley.

Personal problems forced Jones to take a year out, working in Ireland. His return on 30 November 1996 saw him harshly awarded a draw against fellow Cardiff boxer, David Morris. Despite this, fight promoter Frank Warren managed to set up a match with the IBF Inter-Continental super featherweight champion Peter Judson. Fought at the Hillsborough Leisure Centre in Sheffield, the fight went the full distance of twelve rounds, Jones taking the title on points. He then successfully defended the title against Frenchman Affif Djelti.

Warren then secured Jones a challenge for the vacant WBO super featherweight title, against Colombian Wilson Palacio. The fight took place at the London Arena on 19 December 1997, and Jones took the title via unanimous decision (116–112, 118–110, 118–110). A lucrative defence was planned against talented French fighter Julien Lorcy, but a routine brain scan four months later revealed an anomaly. There was a small gap in his membrane, which doctors were unable to diagnose whether as a boxer, this would increase his likelihood of brain damage. In the wake of fellow British boxer Michael Watson's brain injury in 1991, the British Boxing Board of Control were sensitive to any risk and suspended Jones while they investigated further. It took seven months of discussion to finally assure the board that there was no undue cause for concern, and although his license was restored the WBO had already stripped Jones of his title. The WBO promised Jones another attempt at the title when he returned, but by the time he was fit the title was held by the heavy hitting Brazilian Acelino Freitas.

Jones and Freitas met on 15 January 2000, with Jones having fought professionally just once since his return. Jones had only won via knockout once, so it was a surprise when he put the champion down in the first few seconds of the first round. This, however, turned out to be only a small moment of supremacy before Freitas went on to dominate the rest of the match; Jones was knocked down six times and his corner threw in the towel in the eighth round. He never fought professionally again and currently works as a commentator for the TV channels BoxNation, Sky Sports, BT Sport and for MTK Global on iFL TV.

== Personal life ==
Jones is of partial Yemeni descent, through his grandfather.

== See also ==
- List of Welsh boxing world champions

== Bibliography ==
- Hignall, Andrew; Prescott, Gwyn (2007). Cardiff: Sporting Greats. Stroud: Stadia. ISBN 978-0-7524-4286-0.

Sporting positions
Preceded by Regilio Tuur	WBO Super Featherweight Champion; 19 December 1997 – 1998; Vacated	Succeeded by Anatoly Alexandrov
