= Ulaipalota Tauatama =

Samoan boxer

Personal information
- Nationality: Samoan
- Born: 7 February 1970 (age 55)

Sport
- Sport: Boxing

Ulaipalota Tauatama (born 7 February 1970) is a Samoan boxer. He competed in the men's featherweight event at the 1988 Summer Olympics.
