= Shane Knox =

Australian boxer

Personal information
- Nationality: Australian
- Born: 8 September 1965 (age 59)

Sport
- Sport: Boxing

Shane Knox (born 8 September 1965) is an Australian boxer. He competed in the men's featherweight event at the 1984 Summer Olympics. At the 1984 Summer Olympics, he lost to Charles Lubulwa of Uganda.
