= Javier Camacho =

Mexican boxer (born 1964)

Personal information
- Full name: Francisco Javier Camacho Gómez
- Nationality: Mexican
- Born: 27 October 1964 (age 60)

Sport
- Sport: Boxing

Francisco Javier Camacho Gómez (born 27 October 1964) is a Mexican boxer. He competed in the men's featherweight event at the 1984 Summer Olympics.

A native of Monterrey, he is the son of a boxing judge, also named Javier Camacho.
