= Stamatios Kolethras =

Greek boxer (born 1964)

Personal information
- Nationality: Greek
- Born: 6 February 1964 (age 61)

Sport
- Sport: Boxing

Stamatios Kolethras (born 6 February 1964) is a Greek boxer. He competed in the men's featherweight event at the 1984 Summer Olympics. At the 1984 Summer Olympics, he lost to Ali Faki of Malawi.
