= Noureddine Boughanmi =

Tunisian boxer (born 1960)

Personal information
- Nationality: Tunisian
- Born: 3 November 1960
- Died: 23 February 2023 (aged 62)

Sport
- Sport: Boxing

Noureddine Boughanmi (3 November 1960 – 23 February 2023) was a Tunisian boxer. He competed in the men's featherweight event at the 1984 Summer Olympics.
