= Lu Chih-hsiung =

Taiwanese boxer

Personal information
- Full name: 盧 志雄, Pinyin: Lú Zhì-xióng
- Nationality: Taiwanese
- Born: 25 September 1964 (age 60)

Sport
- Sport: Boxing

Lu Chih-hsiung (born 25 September 1964) is a Taiwanese boxer. He competed in the men's featherweight event at the 1988 Summer Olympics.
