= John Franks =

John Franks may refer to:

- John A. Franks, American businessman
- John Franks (judge), Irish Indian judge

== See also ==
- Jack D. Franks, Illinois attorney and politician
- John Frank (disambiguation)
