= Boxing at the 1987 Pan American Games =

The Men's Boxing Tournament at the 1987 Pan American Games was held in the Indiana Convention Center in Indianapolis, United States from August 8 to August 23.

== Clash between Cuban athletes and anti-Castro protestors ==
Tension between Cuba and the United States had already been an issue with the selection of Indianapolis over Havana for the site of the games, and a Cuban boycott had been avoided only when Fidel Castro received a promise that the 1991 Pan American Games would be held in Havana. After the incident with a plane flying a banner urging Cuban athletes to defect in the opening ceremony, Cuban immigrants to the United States continued to use the games as a way to confront the Castro regime, using the Cuban athletes as a proxy. This games marked the first time since the Cuban Revolution that Cuban athletes had participated in the United States. During boxing events at the Indiana Convention Center, anti-Castro Cuban-American protestors mocked the Cuban boxers from the stands. The police were unable to stop the Cuban boxers from entering the stands and punching the protestors in retaliation. According to witnesses, up to a dozen Cuban boxers, including Pablo Romero, as well as a hundred spectators were involved. Two people were hospitalized. After these incidents Manuel Gonzalez Guerra, who was Cuba's top sports official, publicly demanded that organizers keep the anti-Castro protestors away from the Cuban athletes. In private, he also unsuccessfully asked the Indianapolis police chief to lock the activists up. Mark Miles, the president of the organizing committee, made a phone call to the Ronald Reagan administration in the White House, who subsequently pressed Cuban-American activists groups to dial down the pressure by the final week.

== Medal winners ==
Event	Gold	Silver	Bronze
Light Flyweight (– 48 kilograms)	Luis Román Rolón; Puerto Rico	Michael Carbajal; United States	Juan Torres Odelin; Cuba Jesus Herrera; Dominican Republic
Flyweight (– 51 kilograms)	Adalberto Regalado; Cuba	David Griman; Venezuela	Hamilton Rodrigues; Brazil Rafael Ramos; Puerto Rico
Bantamweight (– 54 kilograms)	Manuel Martínez; Cuba	Michael Collins; United States	Domino Domigella; Argentina Rafael del Valle; Puerto Rico
Featherweight (– 57 kilograms)	Kelcie Banks; United States	Emilio Villegas; Dominican Republic	Frank Avelar; El Salvador Esteban Flores; Puerto Rico
Lightweight (– 60 kilograms)	Julio González; Cuba	José Perez; Venezuela	Hector Arroyo; Puerto Rico Marc Menard; Canada
Light Welterweight (– 63.5 kilograms)	Candelario Duvergel; Cuba	Todd Foster; United States	Wanderley Oliveira; Brazil Daniel Cueto; Panama
Welterweight (– 67 kilograms)	Juan Carlos Lemus; Cuba	Kenneth Gould; United States	Pedro Frias; Dominican Republic Rey Rivera; Puerto Rico
Light Middleweight (– 71 kilograms)	Orestes Solano; Cuba	Freddy Sanchez; Puerto Rico	Frank Liles; United States Gary Smikle; Jamaica
Middleweight (– 75 kilograms)	Ángel Espinosa Capó; Cuba	Otis Grant; Canada	Carlos Herrera; Venezuela Juan Montiel; Uruguay
Light Heavyweight (– 81 kilograms)	Pablo Romero Hernandez; Cuba	Nelson Adams; Puerto Rico	Wilfred Moses; Guyana Andrew Maynard; United States
Heavyweight (– 91 kilograms)	Félix Savón; Cuba	Juan Antonio Díaz; Argentina	Domenico d'Amico; Canada Michael Bentt; United States
Super Heavyweight (+ 91 kilograms)	Jorge Luis González; Cuba	Lennox Lewis; Canada	Carlos Barcelete; Brazil Riddick Bowe; United States

== Medal table ==
Rank	Nation	Gold	Silver	Bronze	Total
1	Cuba	10	0	1	11
2	United States	1	4	4	9
3	Puerto Rico	1	2	5	8
4	Canada	0	2	2	4
5	Venezuela	0	2	1	3
6	Dominican Republic	0	1	2	3
7	Argentina	0	1	1	2
8	Brazil	0	0	3	3
9	El Salvador	0	0	1	1
9	Guyana	0	0	1	1
9	Jamaica	0	0	1	1
9	Panama	0	0	1	1
9	Uruguay	0	0	1	1
Totals (13 entries)		12	12	24	48

== See also ==
- Boxing at the 1988 Summer Olympics
