= Joseph Murray (Guyanese boxer) =

Guyanese boxer

Personal information
- Nationality: Guyanese
- Born: 6 May 1967 (age 59) Georgetown, Guyana
- Weight: Featherweight; Super-featherweight; Lightweight

Boxing career
- Stance: Orthodox

Boxing record
- Total fights: 25
- Wins: 19
- Win by KO: 10
- Losses: 6

Joseph Ignatius Murray (born 6 May 1967) is a Guyanese former professional boxer who competed from 1987 to 2000, holding the WBC FECARBOX super-featherweight title in 1993.

He was a protégé of legendary Guyanese trainer Maurice ‘Bizzy’ Boyce.

== Professional career ==
Murray made his professional debut on 18 October 1987, defeating Keith Anthony by first-round knockout (KO) in his hometown of Georgetown, Guyana. After winning 10 of his first 11 fights he defeated Lalta Narine for the vacant national featherweight title on 26 December 1990, retaining once against former Olympian Michael Anthony. From there he moved up two weight classes to capture the vacant national lightweight title in 1991 by beating Winston Goodridge, the man who had handed him his first defeat three years prior.

On 18 April 1993, he defeated Jacobin Yoma by unanimous decision in Georgetown for the vacant WBC FECARBOX super-featherweight title, considered to be the best performance of his 13-year career and one of the best bouts to have ever taken place on Guyanese soil. After two more victories, he faced Anatoly Alexandrov in Russia for the WBC International super-featherweight title, but was knocked out in the second round. He lost four of his next five fights, including a third-round technical knockout (TKO) at the hands of future world champ Shane Mosley, before hanging up his gloves in 2000 with a record of 19–6.

After his retirement, he became a boxing trainer in his homeland, working with a number of young prospects.

== Professional boxing record ==
25 fights	19 wins	6 losses
By knockout	10	5
By decision	9	1

No.	Result	Record	Opponent	Type	Round, time	Date	Location	Notes
25	Loss	19–6	(Guyana) Vincent Howard	TKO	4 (10)	26 Dec 2000	Cliff Anderson Sports Hall, Georgetown, Guyana	
24	Loss	19–5	(United States) Shane Mosley	TKO	3 (10)	21 Dec 1996	(United States) Mohegan Sun Arena, Montville, Connecticut, U.S.	
23	Loss	19–4	(Mexico) Ricardo Vázquez	KO	1 (10), 2:26	28 Sep 1995	Westin Harbour Castle Hotel, Toronto, Ontario, Canada	
22	Win	19–3	(Guyana) Eion Bancroft	PTS	10	26 Feb 1995	Pegasus Hotel, Georgetown, Guyana	
21	Loss	18–3	(South Africa) Ditau Molefyane	RTD	6 (10)	3 Aug 1994	Village Green, Durban, South Africa	
20	Loss	18–2	(Russia) Anatoly Alexandrov	KO	2 (12)	7 May 1994	Sports Palace, Perm, Russia	For WBC International super-featherweight title
19	Win	18–1	(Puerto Rico) Víctor Laureano	PTS	8	22 Feb 1994	National Sports Hall, Georgetown, Guyana	
18	Win	17–1	(Barbados) Anthony Williams	TKO	1 (10)	8 Aug 1993	National Sports Hall, Georgetown, Guyana	
17	Win	16–1	(French Guiana) Jacobin Yoma	UD	12	18 Apr 1993	National Sports Hall, Georgetown, Guyana	Won vacant WBC FECARBOX super-featherweight title
16	Win	15–1	(Trinidad and Tobago) Learie Bruce	TKO	7 (?)	31 Jan 1993	National Sports Hall, Georgetown, Guyana	
15	Win	14–1	(Guyana) Eion Bancroft	TKO	7 (12)	26 Dec 1992	National Park, Georgetown, Guyana	Retained Guyanese lightweight title
14	Win	13–1	(Guyana) Winston Goodridge	PTS	12	26 Dec 1991	Georgetown, Guyana	Won vacant Guyanese lightweight title
13	Win	12–1	(Guyana) Michael Anthony	PTS	12	28 Sep 1991	National Sports Hall, Georgetown, Guyana	Retained Guyanese featherweight title
12	Win	11–1	(Guyana) Lalta Narine	TKO	4 (12)	26 Dec 1990	National Sports Hall, Georgetown, Guyana	Won vacant Guyanese featherweight title
11	Win	10–1	(Barbados) Anthony Williams	UD	10	25 Nov 1990	National Sports Hall, Georgetown, Guyana	
10	Win	9–1	(The Bahamas) Cornbread Williams	PTS	10	30 Jan 1989	(The Bahamas) Nassau, Bahamas	
9	Loss	8–1	(Guyana) Winston Goodridge	UD	10	26 Dec 1988	National Park, Georgetown, Guyana	
8	Win	8–0	(Guyana) Carlton Griffith	TKO	1 (8)	14 Aug 1988	Georgetown, Guyana	
7	Win	7–0	(Guyana) Andrew Williams	TKO	3 (?)	5 Jun 1988	National Park, Georgetown, Guyana	
6	Win	6–0	(Guyana) Ray Jones	UD	8	1 May 1988	National Sports Hall, Georgetown, Guyana	
5	Win	5–0	(Guyana) Malcolm Hawker	PTS	6	28 Feb 1988	Georgetown, Guyana	
4	Win	4–0	(Guyana) Mike Grant	RTD	4 (6), 3:00	31 Jan 1988	National Sports Hall, Georgetown, Guyana	
3	Win	3–0	(Guyana) Wayne Coates	KO	3 (?)	19 Dec 1987	Albion Sports Complex, Albion, Guyana	
2	Win	2–0	(Guyana) Malcolm Darson	TKO	2 (6)	29 Nov 1987	National Sports Hall, Georgetown, Guyana	
1	Win	1–0	(Guyana) Keith Anthony	KO	1 (?), 2:50	18 Oct 1987	National Sports Hall, Georgetown, Guyana	
