= Rotterdam Sportsman of the year =

Annual election

The Rotterdam Sportsman and Sportswoman of the Year is an annual election, organised by the city's division for topsport named Rotterdam Topsport. The award goes to sportspeople who were born or have lived in Rotterdam. Rotterdam was the first city in the Netherlands to honour its sportspeople for their achievements at the end of the year.

== Winners ==
| Year | Men's winner | Men's sport | Women's winner | Women's sport |
|---|---|---|---|---|
| 1986 | Koos Maasdijk | rowing | Elly van Hulst | athletics |
| 1987 | Pieter Slot | waterskiing | Elly van Hulst | athletics |
| 1988 | Regilio Tuur | boxing | None | – |
| 1989 | Koos Maasdijk | rowing | Elly van Hulst | athletics |
| 1990 | Robert Eenhoorn | baseball | Petra Kamstra | tennis |
| 1991 | Jeroen van Dijk | badminton | Letitia Vriesde | athletics |
| 1992 | Regilio Tuur | boxing | Petra Kamstra | tennis |
| 1993 | John den Braber | cycling | Jacqueline Goormachtigh | athletics |
| 1994 | Regilio Tuur | boxing | None | – |
| 1995 | Regilio Tuur | boxing | Letitia Vriesde | athletics |
| 1996 | Koos Maasdijk | rowing | Francis Hoenselaar | darts |
| 1997 | Don Diego Poeder | boxing | Francis Hoenselaar | darts |
| 1998 | Jeroen van Dijk | badminton | Leontien van Moorsel | cycling |
| 1999 | Robert Eenhoorn | baseball | Leontien van Moorsel | cycling |
| 2000 | Raemon Sluiter | tennis | Leontien van Moorsel | cycling |
| 2001 | Raemon Sluiter | tennis | Sissy van Alebeek | cycling |
| 2002 | Raemon Sluiter | tennis | Leontien van Moorsel | cycling |
| 2003 | Francisco Elson | basketball | Leontien van Moorsel | cycling |
| 2004 | Koos de Ronde | equestrian | Leontien van Moorsel | cycling |
| 2005 | Robert Doornbos | auto racing | Elisabeth Willebroordse | judo |
| 2006 | Robin van Persie | football | Fatima Moreira de Melo | field hockey |
| 2007 | Francisco Elson | basketball | Elisabeth Willebroordse | judo |
| 2008 | Robert Lathouwers | athletics | Deborah Gravenstijn | judo |
| 2009 | David Kuiper | rowing | Marhinde Verkerk | judo |
| 2010 | Francisco Elson | basketball | Elisabeth Willeboordse | judo |
| 2011 | Diegomar Markwell | baseball | Edith Bosch | judo |
| 2012 | Robin van Persie | football | Edith Bosch | judo |
| 2013 | Joost Luiten | golf | Lisette Theunissen | swimming |
| 2014 | Joost Luiten | golf | Nouchka Fontijn | boxing |
| 2015 | Rutger van Schaardenburg | sailing | Marhinde Verkerk | judo |
| 2016 | Thomas Verhaar | football | Nouchka Fontijn | boxing |
| 2017 | Karim El Ahmadi | football | Chantal van den Broek-Blaak | cycling |
| 2018 | Michael van der Mark | motorcycle racing | Nouchka Fontijn | boxing |
| 2019 | Georginio Wijnaldum | football | Kelly Dulfer | handball |
| 2021 | Liemarvin Bonevacia | athletics | Lucinda Brand | cycling |
| 2022 | Thomas van Wanrooij | para swimmer | Pien Sanders | field hockey |
| 2023 | Menno van Gorp | breaking | Eythora Thorsdottir | gymnastics |
| 2024 | Isaya Klein Ikkink | athletics | Annette Duetz | sailing |

== See also ==
- Dutch Sportsman of the year
- Amsterdam Sportsman of the year
