= Nicolae Talpoș =

Romanian boxer

Personal information
- Nationality: Romanian
- Born: 19 February 1962
- Died: 20 February 1990 (aged 28) Mădăraș, Romania

Sport
- Sport: Boxing

Nicolae Talpoș (19 February 1962 – 20 February 1990) was a Romanian boxer. He competed in the men's featherweight event at the 1984 Summer Olympics.
