= Alexander Wassa =

Indonesian boxer

Personal information
- Nationality: Indonesian
- Born: 13 March 1963 (age 62) Balikpapan, East Kalimantan, Indonesia

Sport
- Sport: Boxing

Alexander Wassa (born 13 March 1963) is an Indonesian boxer. He competed in the men's featherweight event at the 1984 Summer Olympics.
