= Ayi Sodogah =

Togolese boxer (born 1959)

Personal information
- Nationality: Togolese
- Born: 7 May 1959 (age 65)

Sport
- Sport: Boxing

Ayi Sodogah (born 7 May 1959) is a Togolese boxer. He competed in the men's featherweight event at the 1984 Summer Olympics.
