= John Francis =

John Francis may refer to:

== Arts and entertainment ==
- John Francis (sculptor) (1780–1861), English sculptor
- John F. Francis (1808–1886), American painter
- John Deffett Francis (1815–1901), Welsh portrait painter and art collector
- John J. Francis (musician) (1945-2022), Australian musician

== Law and politics ==
- John Brown Francis (1791–1864), United States senator from Rhode Island
- John M. Francis (1823–1897), American diplomat
- J. J. Francis (John Joseph Francis, 1839–1901), Irish counsel in the British Colony of Hong Kong
- John J. Francis (judge) (1903–1984), American politician and State Supreme Court Justice

== Sports ==
- John Francis (New Zealand cricketer) (1846–1891), New Zealand cricketer
- Jack Francis (John Charles Francis, 1908–2001), Australian cricketer and Australian rules football player
- John Francis (footballer) (born 1963), English association football player
- John Francis (boxer) (born 1965), Indian Olympic boxer
- John Francis (English cricketer) (born 1980), English cricketer
- John Francis (rugby union), Australian international rugby union player

== Others ==
- John Francis (priest) (died 1724), Irish Anglican priest
- John Francis (publisher) (1811–1882), English businessman and campaigner against "taxes on knowledge"
- John Francis (bushranger) (c. 1825–?), Australian bushranger
- John R. Francis (1856–1913), American physician and educator
- John G. F. Francis (born 1934), English computer scientist
- John Francis (environmentalist) (born 1946), American environmentalist
- John Michael Francis (born 1968), Canadian historian

== See also ==
- Jon Francis (born 1964), American football player
- John Francis Regis (1597–1640), French saint of the Roman Catholic Church
