= Orlando Dollente =

Filipino boxer

Personal information
- Nationality: Filipino
- Born: October 24, 1964 (age 61)
- Height: 5 ft 9 in (175 cm)
- Weight: 126 lb (57 kg)

Sport
- Sport: Boxing

Orlando Dollente (born October 24, 1964) is a Filipino boxer. He competed in the men's featherweight event at the 1988 Summer Olympics.
