= Richard Pittman (boxer) =

New Zealand-Cook Islands boxer

Personal information
- Nationality: New Zealander
- Born: Richard Pittman; 10 May 1957 (age 69) Cook Islands
- Height: 1.78 m (5 ft 10 in)
- Weight: 57 kg (126 lb)

Sport
- Country: Cook Islands
- Sport: Boxing

Richard Pittman (born 10 May 1957) is a former New Zealand boxer who competed for the Cook Islands.

Pittman competed at the 1988 Summer Olympics in Seoul as an entrant in the featherweight division. He received a bye in the first round and then beat Dumsane Mabuza from Swaziland 4–1 on points before losing to Ya'acov Shmuel from Israel 0–5 on points. He also competed at the 1978 and 1990 Commonwealth Games.

In 1992 he made his professional debut, and over the nine years he had 15 fights winning 8 and losing 7.
