= John Francis (boxer) =

Indian boxer

Personal information
- Full name: John William Francis
- Nationality: Indian
- Born: 24 April 1965 (age 59)

Sport
- Sport: Boxing

John Francis (born 24 April 1965) is an Indian boxer. He competed in the men's featherweight event at the 1988 Summer Olympics. At the 1988 Summer Olympics, he lost to Liu Dong of China.
