= Nirmal Lorick =

Trinidad and Tobago boxer (born 1965)

Personal information
- Nationality: Trinidad and Tobago
- Born: 10 September 1965 (age 59)

Sport
- Sport: Boxing

Nirmal Lorick (born 10 September 1965) is a Trinidad and Tobago boxer. He competed in the men's featherweight event at the 1984 Summer Olympics.
