= Domingo Damigella =

Argentine boxer

Domingo Nicolas Damigella (born January 6, 1968, in Tandil, Buenos Aires) is a former featherweight boxer from Argentina, who represented his native country at the 1988 Summer Olympics in Seoul, South Korea. There he was eliminated in the first round by Great Britain's David Anderson. Nicknamed Minguito, Damigella made his professional debut on November 26, 1988.

== 1988 Olympic results ==
Below is the record of Domingo Damigella, an Argentinian featherweight boxer who competed at the 1988 Seoul Olympics:

- Round of 64: lost to David Anderson (Great Britain) by decision, 1-4

== Title bouts ==
Date	Title	Opponent	Venue	Result	By
February 4, 1995	WBO Featherweight Title	Steve Robinson	Cardiff, Wales	Lost	UD
September 12, 1998	WBU Featherweight Title	Cassius Baloyi	Pottsville, Pennsylvania	Lost	TKO
June 2, 2001	WBU Super Featherweight Title	Phillip N'dou	Brakpan, South Africa	Lost	TKO
