= Mike Deveney =

Scottish boxer

Personal information
- Nationality: British
- Born: 14 December 1965 (age 60) Elderslie, Scotland
- Height: 5 ft 5 in (165 cm)
- Weight: Featherweight

Boxing career

Boxing record
- Total fights: 42
- Wins: 22
- Win by KO: 4
- Losses: 19
- Draws: 1

Michael Deveney (born 14 December 1965) is a Scottish former boxer, who represented the UK at the 1988 Summer Olympics before a professional career that included winning the British featherweight title in 1995.

== Career ==
Born in Elderslie, Deveney first made his mark as an amateur, representing the UK at the 1998 Olympics in Seoul at bantamweight.

He made his professional debut in February 1991 with a points win over the unbeaten John George. A mixed record in his first four years as a professional included defeats at the hands of Barry Jones and Elvis Parsley, but in January 1995 he got a shot at the vacant British featherweight title against Wilson Docherty; Deveney won narrowly on points to become British champion. Deveney lost the title in his first defence eight months later, when he was outpointed by Jon Jo Irwin. Previous to that title defence, he lost an 8-round non-title fight against Dean Phillips, who floored him twice en route to losing 5 of the 8 rounds to the Welshman.

Deveney twice made unsuccessful challenges for the BBBofC Scottish Area title in 1996, both against Brian Carr.

He continued boxing until 1998, finishing with a record of 22 wins, 19 losses, and 1 draw.
