= Esteban Flores =

Puerto Rican boxer (born 1967)

Personal information
- Nationality: Puerto Rican
- Born: 8 August 1967 (age 58)

Sport
- Sport: Boxing
Medal record
Men's amateur boxing
Representing Puerto Rico
Pan American Games
Bronze medal – third place	1987 Indianapolis	Featherweight

Esteban Flores (born 8 August 1967) is a Puerto Rican boxer. He competed in the men's featherweight event at the 1988 Summer Olympics.
