= Rajabu Hussen =

Tanzanian boxer (born 1947)

Personal information
- Nationality: Tanzanian

Sport
- Sport: Boxing

Rajabu Hussen (born 18 February 1947) is a former Tanzanian boxer who competed in the men's featherweight event at the 1984 Summer Olympics in Los Angeles, United States. He also participated in several professional bouts and became a national champion in his weight class.
