= Serigne Fall =

Guinean boxer (born 1960)

Personal information
- Nationality: Guinean
- Born: 1960 (age 64–65)

Sport
- Sport: Boxing

Serigne Fall (born 1960) is a Guinean boxer. He competed in the men's featherweight event at the 1988 Summer Olympics.
