= Diego Drumm =

German boxer

Personal information
- Nationality: German
- Born: 18 December 1968 (age 57) Leipzig, East Germany

Sport
- Sport: Boxing

Diego Drumm (born 18 December 1968) is a German boxer. He competed in the men's featherweight event at the 1988 Summer Olympics, representing East Germany. At the 1988 Summer Olympics, he lost to Kirkor Kirkorov of Bulgaria.
