= Sodikin =

Indonesian weightlifter (born 1969)

Personal information
- Nationality: Indonesian
- Born: 5 April 1969 (age 56)

Sport
- Sport: Weightlifting

Sodikin (born 5 April 1969) is an Indonesian weightlifter. He competed at the 1988 Summer Olympics and the 1992 Summer Olympics.
