= José Umaña =

Venezuelan swimmer (born 1965)

Personal information
- Full name: Alberto José Umaña
- Born: August 2, 1965 (age 60)

Sport
- Sport: Swimming
- Strokes: Butterfly
Medal record
Representing Venezuela
Central American and Caribbean Games
Gold medal – first place	1982 Havana	4x200m freestyle relay
Gold medal – first place	1986 Santiago	200m butterfly
Gold medal – first place	1986 Santiago	4x100m medley relay

Alberto José Umaña (born 2 August 1965) is a former Venezuelan swimmer who competed in the 1984 Summer Olympics.
