= Tserendorj Amarjargal =

Mongolian boxer (born 1964)

Tserendorj Amarjargal (born June 25, 1964) is a boxer from Mongolia, who competed in the featherweight (– 57 kg) division at the 1988 Summer Olympics.

At the 1988 Olympics, he lost his opening bout to Jamie Pagendam of Canada in unusual circumstances. In the second round, Tserendorj was give a standing-8 count. Pagendam was subsequently knocked down once in the second round, then climbed off the floor and soon knocked down Tserendorj. After that, Ivorian referee Joseph Lougbo gave another standing-8 count against the Mongolian, which should have terminated the bout, according to international rules. In the third round, however, Pagendam was rocked by a punch to the head by Tserendorj, and Lougbo stopped the bout, awarding the Mongolian the win. Afterwards, Canada protested, contending that Pagendam had actually won the bout in the second round. The protest was upheld, and AIBA announced that the referee was suspended for the rest of the Games. Later however, the Canadians were informed that although Pagendam was the winner of the bout, he could not continue in the tournament for medical reasons. According to AIBA rules, fighters whose bouts are stopped because of head blows may not fight again for 60 days.

Tserendorj also represented Mongolia in the bantamweight (– 54 kg) division at the 1984 Friendship Games in Havana, losing his opening bout to Tibor Botos of Hungary as well as at the 1986 Goodwill Games in Moscow, where he lost his first fight to Bernard Price of the United States. At the 1989 World Amateur Boxing Championships in Moscow, he lost his opening bout in the featherweight division to eventual bronze medalist James Nicolson of Australia.
