= Jamie Pagendam =

Canadian boxer (born 1965)

James Pagendam (born December 1, 1965, in Toronto, Ontario) is a boxer from Canada, competing in the featherweight (– 57 kg) division.

A resident of St. Catharines, Ontario, he represented his native country at the 1988 Summer Olympics in Seoul, South Korea. He was involved in one of the many controversies that engulfed the Olympic boxing tournament.

In Pagendam's opening bout versus Tserendorj Amarjargal of Mongolia, Ivorian referee Joseph Lougbo gave Tserendorj a standing-8 count in the second round. Pagendam was subsequently knocked down once in the second round, then climbed off the floor and soon knocked down Tserendorj. After that, the referee gave another standing-8 count against the Mongolian, which should have terminated the bout, according to international rules. In the third round, however, Pagendam was rocked by a punch to the head, and Lougbo stopped the bout, awarding the Mongolian the win. Afterwards, Canada protested, contending that Pagendam had actually won the bout in the second round. The protest was upheld, and AIBA announced that the referee was suspended from the rest of the Games' boxing tournament. Later however, the Canadians were informed that although Pagendam was the winner of the bout, he could not continue in the tournament for medical reasons. According to AIBA rules, fighters whose bouts are stopped because of head blows may not fight again for 60 days.

He also represented Canada at the 1994 Commonwealth Games, losing his opening bout to Peter Richardson of England. Jamie is the brother of Steve Pagendam. Steve, a featherweight, competed for Canada in the boxing tournament at the 1984 Los Angeles Olympics.
