= Daniel Londas =

French boxer

Personal information
- Nationality: French
- Born: 17 May 1954 (age 72) Fort-de-France, Martinique
- Height: 166 cm (5 ft 5 in)
- Weight: Super featherweight; Lightweight

Boxing career

Boxing record
- Total fights: 68
- Wins: 58
- Win by KO: 25
- Losses: 9
- Draws: 1

Daniel Londas (born 17 May 1954) is a French former boxer who competed for France in the men's featherweight competition at the 1980 Summer Olympics in Moscow. After a first-round bye, he was eliminated in the second round by Soviet Viktor Rybakov (0-5).

Londas then became a professional, recording 58 wins (25 knockouts), 9 losses and 1 no-decision. In 1992 he took the WBO Junior Lightweight title.

== Olympic Results ==
Below is the Olympic record of Daniel Londas, a French featherweight boxer who competed at the 1980 Moscow Olympics

- Round of 64: bye
- Round of 32: lost to Viktor Rybakov (Soviet Union) by decision, 0-5.

== See also ==
- List of super-featherweight boxing champions

Achievements
Preceded by Kamel Bou-Ali	WBO super featherweight champion 21 March 1992 - 4 September 1992	Succeeded by Jimmi Bredahl
