= Steve Frank (American football) =

American football player and coach (born 1950)

Biographical details
- Born: 1950 (age 75–76)

Playing career
- 1968–1971: Bridgeport
- 1973: Bridgeport Jets
- Position: Center

Coaching career (HC unless noted)
- 1974–1977: Norwich (assistant)
- 1978–1982: Davidson (assistant)
- 1983–1984: Princeton (assistant)
- 1985–1999: Hamilton

Head coaching record
- Overall: 55–63–1

Steve Frank (born 1950) is an American former football player and coach. He served as the head football coach at Hamilton College in Clinton, New York from 1985 to 1999, compiling a record of 55–63–1. Frank played college football at the University of Bridgeport from 1968 to 1971.
