= Serge Bouemba =

Gabonese boxer (born 1967)

Personal information
- Nationality: Gabonese
- Born: 7 January 1967 (age 58); Zawiya, Libya

Sport
- Sport: Boxing

Serge Bouemba (born 7 January 1967) is a Gabonese boxer. He competed in the men's featherweight event at the 1988 Summer Olympics.
