= Ya'acov Shmuel =

Israeli boxer

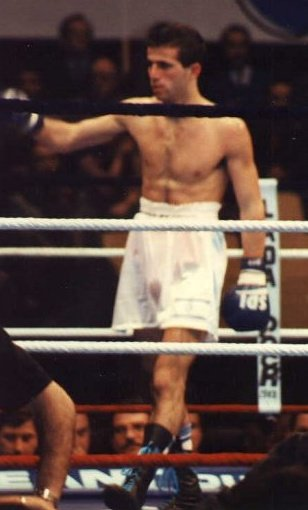
- ya'acov shmuel professional boxing fight 1990

Personal information
- Born: יעקב שמואל; August 7, 1968 (age 58) Israel
- Height: 5 ft 6.5 in (169 cm)
- Weight: 126 lb (57 kg)

Boxing career
- Stance: boxing

Boxing record
- Total fights: 7
- Wins: 2
- Losses: 5

Ya'acov Shmuel (Hebrew: יעקב שמואל; born August 7, 1968) is an Israeli former Olympic boxer. He was undefeated in seven fights as a professional.

== Personal life ==
When he competed, Shmuel was 5 ft 6.5 in (169 cm) tall, and weighed 126 lb (57 kg). He was born in Israel, and is Jewish.

== Boxing career ==
Shmuel competed for Israel at the 1988 Summer Olympics, boxing in the Men's Featherweight category, and came in tied for fifth. He was 20 years of age. He received a bye in the first round, defeated John Mirona of Sudan in the second round (knocking out Mirona at 1:15 of the bout's first round), beat Richard Pittman of the Cook Islands in the third round, and lost to ultimate gold medalist Giovanni Parisi of Italy in the quarter-finals.

He became a professional after the Olympics. Fighting as a professional from 1988 to 2000, Shmuel was undefeated at 7–0 in fights in Israel and France.
