= Jorge Henão =

Venezuelan swimmer (born 1962)

Personal information
- Born: July 13, 1962 (age 63)

Sport
- Sport: Swimming
- Strokes: Breaststroke
Medal record
Representing Venezuela
Central American and Caribbean Games
Gold medal – first place	1986 Santiago	4x100m medley relay

Jorge Henão (born 13 July 1962) is a former Venezuelan swimmer who competed in the 1984 Summer Olympics.
