= Rafael Zuñiga =

Colombian boxer (born 1963)

Personal information
- Born: May 6, 1963 (age 63)
Medal record
Men's Boxing
Representing Colombia
Pan American Games
Bronze medal – third place	1983 Caracas	Featherweight

Rafael Zuñiga Medrano (born May 6, 1963, in Bolívar) is a retired Colombian boxer, who represented his native country at the 1984 Summer Olympics in Los Angeles in the Men's Featherweight division. Zuñiga won the bronze medal in the same weight category a year earlier at the 1983 Pan American Games.
