= Dumsane Mabuza =

Swazi boxer (born 1968)

Personal information
- Nationality: Swazi
- Born: 18 May 1968 (age 56)

Sport
- Sport: Boxing

Dumsane Mabuza (born 18 May 1968) is a Swazi boxer. He competed in the men's featherweight event at the 1988 Summer Olympics.
