= I Nyoman Sudarma =

Indonesian weightlifter (born 1968)

Personal information
- Nationality: Indonesian
- Born: 20 September 1968 (age 56)

Sport
- Sport: Weightlifting

I Nyoman Sudarma (born 20 September 1968) is an Indonesian weightlifter. He competed at the 1988 Summer Olympics and the 1992 Summer Olympics.
