= Abraham Mieses =

Dominican Republic boxer

Personal information
- Nationality: Dominican

Sport
- Sport: Boxing

Abraham Mieses is a Dominican Republic boxer. He competed in the men's featherweight event at the 1984 Summer Olympics.
