= John Frank (epidemiologist) =

Canadian epidemiologist

Professor John Frank FRCPC FCAHS FRSE FFPH

Professor of Public Health Research and Policy, University of Edinburgh
- In office 2008–2022

Personal details
- Born: June 23, 1949 (age 76) Guelph, Ontario, Canada

John William Frank (born June 23, 1949) is a Canadian epidemiologist.

== Career ==
He was trained in medicine and community medicine at the University of Toronto, in family medicine at McMaster University, and in epidemiology at the London School of Hygiene and Tropical Medicine.

He was the founding Director of Research at the Institute for Work & Health in Toronto from 1991 until 1997, and was a Senior Scientist at that Institute until 2008.

Frank was a Fellow with the Canadian Institute for Advanced Research Population Health Program until it closed in 2003, and professor at the University of Toronto in the Department of Public Health Sciences (now the Dalla Lana School of Public Health) from 1983 until 2008.

Frank was Provostial Advisor on Population Health at the University of Toronto from 1994 to 1997. From 1997 to 2001, he was adjunct professor at the School of Public Health at the University of California, Berkeley, where he received the Distinguished Teacher and Mentor of the Year Award.

In December 2000, he was appointed Scientific Director of the Canadian Institutes of Health Research's Institute of Population and Public Health.

In July 2008, he was appointed chair, Public Health Research and Policy, at the University of Edinburgh, having been competitively hired as Director of a new Centre, the Scottish Collaboration for Public Health Research and Policy.

== Selected publications ==
- Frank JW. Paradoxical Aspects of Low Back Pain in Workers’ Compensation Settings. IN: Hyatt D, Gunderson M (Eds.) Workers’ Compensation: Foundations for Reform. Toronto: University of Toronto Press, 2000, 96–117.
- Frank JW, Maetzel A. Determining What Constitutes an Occupational Disorder: Can this Camel Really Carry More Straw? (Commissioned paper for the Royal Commission on Workers Compensation of British Columbia.) IN: Sullivan TJ (Ed.) Injury and the New World of Work. Vancouver: University of British Columbia Press, 2000, 265–283.
- Frank JW, Mustard C, Dunn J, Ross N, Di Ruggiero E. Assessing and Addressing Health Inequalities: The Canadian Experience (Chapter 5). IN: A Killoran, C Swann and M Kelly (Eds). Public Health Evidence: Tackling Health Inequalities. Oxford University Press: London, 2006; pp 485–508. (commissioned by the U.K. Health Development Agency)
- Frank JW, Jepson R. High-Risk Versus Population Prevention Strategies For Chronic Disease: Geoffrey Rose Revisited In The 21st Century. In: McQueen, D. (Ed.) Global Handbook on Non-communicable Disease and Health Promotion. Springer: New York, 2013, pp 3–19.
- Frank JW, Jepson R, Williams AJ. Disease Prevention: A Critical Toolkit. Oxford: Oxford University Press, 2016 (215 pages). ISBN 978-0-19-872586-2.
- Frank J, Bernstein A. "Population Health" in Barer M et al. (Eds.) Chapter in Festschrift volume for Professor Robert G. Evans, University of British Columbia, 2017
