= Raúl Trapero =

Spanish boxer

Personal information
- Nationality: Spanish
- Born: 12 April 1963; León, Spain
- Died: 15 September 2010 (aged 47); Alfaro, Spain

Sport
- Sport: Boxing

Raúl Trapero (12 April 1963 – 15 September 2010) was a Spanish boxer. He competed in the men's featherweight event at the 1984 Summer Olympics.
