= John Mirona =

Sudanese boxer (born 1962)

Personal information
- Nationality: Sudan
- Born: جون ميشيل ميرونا; 1962 (age 63–64)

Boxing career

John Michel Mirona (جون ميشيل ميرونا; born 1962) is a former Olympic boxer from Sudan.

== Boxing career ==
He competed for Sudan at the 1988 Summer Olympics in Seoul, South Korea in boxing. In Men's Featherweight he came in tied for 17th.

He received a bye in the first round, and was defeated by Ya'acov Shmuel of Israel in the second round. Shmuel knocked out Mirona in their 125.5-lb bout at 1:15 of the first round.
