= Moussa Kagambega =

Burkinabé boxer (born 1965)

Personal information
- Born: 30 June 1965 (age 61)

Sport
- Sport: Boxing

Moussa Kagambega (born 30 June 1965) is a Burkinabé boxer who competed at the 1988 Summer Olympics.

Kagambega competed in the featherweight classification. He received a bye in the opening round of the tournament (the round of 64). In the round of 32 he boxed against Omar Catarí of Venezuela. Kagambega was knocked out in round one after 2 minutes and 5 seconds.

== 1988 Olympic results ==
Below is the record of Moussa Kagambega, a featherweight boxer from Burkina Faso who competed at the 1988 Seoul Olympics:

- Round of 64: bye
- Round of 32: lost to Omar Catarí (Venezuela) by first-round knockout
