= Steve Frank (boxer) =

Guyanese boxer

Personal information
- Nationality: Guyanese
- Born: 14 April 1965 (age 60)

Sport
- Sport: Boxing

Steve Frank (born 14 April 1965) is a Guyanese boxer. He competed in the men's featherweight event at the 1984 Summer Olympics. He was inducted in the Florida Boxing Hall of Fame.
