= Jimmi Bredahl =

Danish boxer

Personal information
- Born: Jimmy Bredahl Johansen; 26 August 1967 (age 59) Copenhagen, Denmark
- Height: 178 cm (5 ft 10 in)
- Weight: Super featherweight

Boxing career
- Reach: 171 cm (67 in)
- Stance: Southpaw

Boxing record
- Total fights: 29
- Wins: 26
- Win by KO: 7
- Losses: 3

Jimmi Bredahl Johansen (born 26 August 1967), known professionally as Jimmi Bredahl or Jimmy Bredahl, is a Danish former professional boxer. He is the former WBO world super featherweight champion. He is the older brother of former two-division world champion of boxing, Johnny Bredahl.

== Professional career ==
In March 1989, Bredahl turned professional winning his first fight in Brædstrup, when Bredahl beat England's Des Gargano with a points decision over six rounds.

=== Title fights ===
Bredahl won his first title belt, the vacant EBU (European) super featherweight title, in March 1992 with an eleventh-round knockout win over France's Pierre Lorcy. The following weekend his brother Johnny won the bantamweight version of the European title.

In his next fight, later that year Bredahl won the WBO super featherweight title with a win over Daniel Londas. On the same bill his brother Johnny won the super flyweight version of the WBO title.

=== De La Hoya fight ===
Bredahl's highest profile fight in March 1994 at the Olympic Auditorium, Los Angeles, in the United States when he defended his WBO Super Featherweight belt super featherweight title. against Oscar De La Hoya. However, Bredahl suffered the first defeat of his career when De La Hoya beat him. After being on the canvas in the first and second rounds Bredahl lost by knockout in the tenth round to lose his title.

Bredahl then lost a European super featherweight title fight later that year to Jacobin Yoma.

== Later career ==
After suffering these two straight defeats Bredahl then returned to the ring five months later and went on a string of ten straight victories including winning the IBO super featherweight title in 1996.

In his last fight of his career, Bredahl faced little fancied American Troy Dorsey. Bredahl retired from the fight between the 7th and 8th rounds and would never fight again.

== See also ==
- List of super-featherweight boxing champions

Sporting positions
Major world boxing titles
Preceded by Daniel Londas	WBO super featherweight champion 4 September 1992 - 5 March 1994	Succeeded by Oscar De La Hoya
Minor world boxing titles
Vacant Title last held by Israel Cardona	IBO super featherweight champion 29 March 1996 - 1996; Vacates	Vacant Title next held by Israel Cardona
