= Giovanni Frigo =

Venezuelan swimmer (born 1963)

Personal information
- Full name: Giovanni Carlos Frigo Luque
- Born: September 21, 1963 (age 62) Venezuela
- Height: 1.97 m (6 ft 6 in)
- Weight: 83 kg (183 lb)

Sport
- Sport: Swimming
- Strokes: Backstroke
- Club: Paraiso GT
Medal record
Men's swimming
Representing Venezuela
Pan American Games
Bronze medal – third place	1983 Caracas	4x100m medley

Giovani Carlos Frigo Luque (born 21 September 1963) is a Venezuelan former swimmer who competed in the 1984 Summer Olympics.
