= Kelcie Banks =

American boxer (born 1965)

Personal information
- Nickname: Mr. Mix
- Born: Kelcie Herron Banks; May 8, 1965 (age 61) Chicago, Illinois, U.S.
- Height: 6 ft 0 in (183 cm)

Boxing career
- Stance: Southpaw

Boxing record
- Total fights: 30
- Wins: 22
- Win by KO: 11
- Losses: 6
- Draws: 2
Medal record
Men's Boxing
Representing the United States
World Cup
Silver medal – second place	1985 Seoul	Featherweight
World Amateur Championships
Gold medal – first place	1986 Reno	Featherweight
Pan American Games
Gold medal – first place	1987 Indianapolis	Featherweight

Kelcie Herron Banks (born May 8, 1965) is an American former professional boxer. As an amateur, he won the gold medal at the 1986 World Championships in Reno and at the 1987 Pan American Games in Indianapolis. Inducted to the USA Boxing Hall of Fame in 1993. He represented his native country at the 1988 Summer Olympics in Seoul, South Korea, where he was surprisingly knocked out cold in the first round by the Netherlands' Regilio Tuur.

== Amateur highlights ==
- Claimed a record of 460-86
- 1986 United States Amateur Featherweight champion
- 1986 World Amateur Featherweight champion
- 1987 United States Amateur Featherweight champion
- 1987 Gold Medalist at Pan-American Games in Indianapolis as a Featherweight
- Qualified for the United States Olympic Team as a Featherweight. Defeated Jesse James Leija and Eddie Hopson to earn a berth
- Was knocked out in the 1st round of opening round match, by Regilio Tuur (Netherlands).

Banks had an amateur record of reportedly 500+ fights by 1985 already.

== 1988 Olympic results ==
Below is the record of Kelcie Banks, an American featherweight boxer who competed at the 1988 Seoul Olympics:

- Round of 64: lost to Regilio Tuur (Netherlands) by first-round knockout

== Professional career ==
In his professional career Banks retired in 1997, with a record of 22 wins (11 knockouts), six losses and two draws. Banks tried to return to boxing in 2002, but a license was denied by the Nevada State Athletic Commission.
