= Ed Pollard =

Barbadian boxer (born 1962)

Personal information
- Nationality: Barbadian
- Born: 26 September 1962 (age 62)

Sport
- Sport: Boxing

Ed Pollard (born 26 September 1962) is a Barbadian former professional boxer who competed from 1985 to 1996. As an amateur, he represented his country in the men's featherweight event at the 1984 Summer Olympics. Pollard also represented Barbados at the 1983 Pan American Games.
