= Frank Avelar =

Salvadoran boxer (born 1969)

Personal information
- Full name: Francisco José Avelar
- Born: 15 December 1969 (age 56) San Salvador, El Salvador

Sport
- Sport: Boxing
Medal record
Men's amateur boxing
Representing El Salvador
Pan American Games
Bronze medal – third place	1987 Indianapolis	Featherweight

Francisco José Avelar (born 15 December 1969) is a Salvadoran boxer. He competed in the men's featherweight event at the 1988 Summer Olympics.
