= Ilham Lahia =

Indonesian boxer

Personal information
- Full name: Ilham B. Lahia
- Nationality: Indonesian
- Born: 29 December 1967 (age 57)

Sport
- Sport: Boxing

Ilham Beltasar Lahia (born 29 December 1967) is an Indonesian boxer. He competed in the men's featherweight event at the 1988 Summer Olympics.
