= Dave Anderson (boxer) =

British boxer

Personal information
- Full name: David Anderson
- Born: 23 October 1965 (age 60) Glasgow, Scotland

Sport
- Sport: Boxing
Medal record
Boxing
Representing Scotland
European Championships
Bronze medal – third place	1989 Athens	Lightweight
Commonwealth Games
Bronze medal – third place	1990 Auckland	Lightweight

David Anderson (born 23 December 1965) is a British boxer. He competed in the men's featherweight event at the 1988 Summer Olympics.

Anderson won the 1988 Amateur Boxing Association British featherweight title, when boxing out of the Bellahouston BC.
