= Paul Harvey (boxer) =

English boxer

Personal information
- Nationality: English
- Born: 10 November 1964 (age 61) Islington, England
- Height: 5 ft 8 in (1.73 m)
- Weight: feather/super feather/lightweight

Boxing career
- Stance: Orthodox

Boxing record
- Total fights: 22
- Wins: 16 (KO 10)
- Losses: 5 (KO 1)
- Draws: 1

Paul Harvey (born 10 November 1964) is an English professional boxer of the 1980s and '90s who won the Commonwealth super featherweight title and was a challenger for the World Boxing Board (WBB) featherweight title against Steve Robinson, and Wilson Docherty, his professional fighting weight varied from 125 lb (57 kg; 8 st 13 lb), i.e. featherweight to 133 lb (60 kg; 9 st 7 lb), i.e. lightweight. He was trained by his father, Lennox Harvey, who had moved to the country from Trinidad and worked as a local bus driver. Paul had a record of 16-1-5 over his 22 fights.
