= Liu Dong (boxer) =

Chinese boxer

Personal information
- Nationality: Chinese
- Born: 30 August 1968 (age 56)

Sport
- Sport: Boxing

Liu Dong (born 30 August 1968) is a Chinese boxer. He competed in the men's featherweight event at the 1988 Summer Olympics.
