= Tomasz Nowak (boxer) =

Polish boxer

Personal information
- Nationality: Polish
- Born: 30 August 1960 Warsaw, Poland
- Died: 1 August 2013 (aged 52) Warsaw, Poland

Sport
- Sport: Boxing
Medal record
Men's amateur boxing
Representing Poland
European Championships
Bronze medal – third place	1985 Budapest	Featherweight

Tomasz Nowak (30 August 1960 – 1 August 2013) was a Polish boxer. He competed in the men's featherweight event at the 1988 Summer Olympics.
