= Peter Konyegwachie =

Nigerian boxer (born 1965)

Medal record

Men's boxing

Representing Nigeria

Olympic Games
Silver medal – second place	1984 Los Angeles	Featherweight

Commonwealth Games
Gold medal – first place	1982 Brisbane	Featherweight

Peter Konyegwachie (MON born 26 November 1965) was a Nigerian boxer from Ogwashi-Uku. Konyegwachie attended Adaigbo Secondary School. At the 1984 Summer Olympics he won Nigeria's first ever silver medal in the men's Featherweight (54–57 kg) category.

Konyegwachie became professional in 1986 and won his first 15 fights prior to getting stopped by a journeyman in 1990. He retired after the bout at 15-1-0.
