= Daniel Dumitrescu =

Romanian boxer

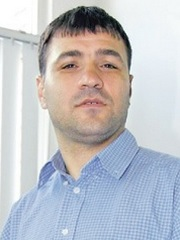

Personal information
- Born: 23 September 1968 (age 57) Bucharest, Romania
- Height: 171 cm (5 ft 7 in)

Sport
- Sport: Boxing
Medal record
Representing Romania
Olympic Games
Silver medal – second place	1988 Seoul	-57 kg
European Amateur Championships
Silver medal – second place	1989 Athens	-60 kg

Daniel Dumitrescu (born 23 September 1968) is a retired Romanian boxer who won silver medals at the 1988 Summer Olympics and 1989 European Amateur Boxing Championships. In 1989 he fled from Romania to Greece and then to Germany, where he stayed for one year. He also participated in the 1992 Summer Olympics. In 1993 he turned professional and retired in 1997 with a record of five victories and two losses. In 2009, he was arrested in Rome for stealing wallets.
