= Darrell Hiles =

Australian boxer

Personal information
- Nationality: Australian
- Born: 10 January 1969
- Height: 5 ft 8 1/2 in (174 cm)

Boxing career

Boxing record
- Total fights: 37
- Wins: 20
- Win by KO: 7
- Losses: 17

Darrell Hiles (born 10 January 1969) is an Indigenous Australian boxer who competed at the 1988 Seoul Olympics in the featherweight division.

On March 1 1992, Hiles faced Kostya Tszyu in the future champion's professional debut, losing by a first-roind knockout at one minute and ten seconds Hiles eventually retired from professional boxing with a record of 20 wins and 17 losses.
