= Azzedine Saïd =

Algerian boxer (born 1961)

Personal information
- Nationality: Algerian
- Born: 20 May 1961 (age 63)

Sport
- Sport: Boxing

Azzedine Saïd (born 20 May 1961) is an Algerian boxer. He competed at the 1984 Summer Olympics and the 1988 Summer Olympics.
