= Satoru Higashi =

Japanese boxer (born 1963)

Personal information
- Nationality: Japanese
- Born: 18 July 1963 (age 61); Tokyo, Japan

Sport
- Sport: Boxing

Satoru Higashi (東 悟, Higashi Satoru, born 18 July 1963) is a Japanese boxer. He competed at the 1984 Summer Olympics and the 1988 Summer Olympics.
