= Paul Fitzgerald (boxer) =

Irish boxer (born 1963)

Personal information
- Nationality: Irish
- Born: 7 January 1963 (age 62)

Sport
- Sport: Boxing

Paul Fitzgerald (born 7 January 1963) is an Irish boxer. He competed at the 1984 Summer Olympics and the 1988 Summer Olympics.
