= John Wanjau =

Kenyan boxer (born 1958)

Personal information
- Nationality: Kenyan
- Born: 3 June 1958 (age 67)

Sport
- Sport: Boxing

John Wanjau (born 3 June 1958) is a Kenyan boxer. He competed at the 1984 Summer Olympics and the 1988 Summer Olympics.
