= Akhmed Kotiev =

Russian boxer

Akhmed Kotiev Ахмед Котиев
Personal information
- Nationality: Russian
- Born: January 15, 1968 (age 58) Vladikavkaz, Russian SFSR, USSR (now Russia)
- Height: 5 ft 8 in (173 cm)
- Weight: Lightweight; Light welterweight

Boxing career
- Stance: Orthodox

Boxing record
- Total fights: 30
- Wins: 27
- Win by KO: 15
- Losses: 2
- No contests: 1

Akhmed Yakubovich Kotiev (Russian: Ахмед Якубович Котиев; born January 15, 1968) is a Russian former professional boxer who competed from 1991 to 2000. He held the WBO welterweight title from 1998 to 2000.

== Professional career ==
Kotiev turned professional in 1991 and amassed a record of 22-1 (1 NC) before beating American boxer Leonard Townsend and winning the interim WBO welterweight title. He was eventually promoted to full champion after the incumbent champion Mihai Leu, retired from the sport. In his fourth title defense, he won a tightly contested bout against Puerto Rican contender Daniel Santos. He lost the rematch against Santos five months later.

== Professional boxing record ==
| 30 fights | 27 wins | 2 losses |
|---|---|---|
| By knockout | 15 | 1 |
| By decision | 12 | 1 |
| No contests | 1 | |

| No. | Result | Record | Opponent | Type | Round, time | Date | Location | Notes |
|---|---|---|---|---|---|---|---|---|
| 30 | Loss | 27–2 (1) | Daniel Santos | KO | 5 (12) | 2000-05-06 | Swissotel, Neuss, Germany | Lost WBO welterweight title |
| 29 | Win | 27–1 (1) | Daniel Santos | SD | 12 (12) | 1999-11-27 | Hansehalle, Lübeck, Germany | Retained WBO welterweight title |
| 28 | Win | 26–1 (1) | Peter Malinga | TKO | 3 (12) | 1999-04-24 | Circus Krone, Munich, Germany | Retained WBO welterweight title |
| 27 | Win | 25–1 (1) | Santos Cardona | UD | 12 (12) | 1998-11-28 | Hansehalle, Lübeck, Germany | Retained WBO welterweight title |
| 26 | Win | 24–1 (1) | Paulo Alejandro Sanchez | UD | 12 (12) | 1998-05-23 | Oberrheinhalle, Offenburg, Germany | Retained WBO welterweight title |
| 25 | Win | 23–1 (1) | Leonard Townsend | UD | 12 (12) | 1998-02-14 | Maritim Hotel, Stuttgart, Germany | Won interim WBO welterweight title |
| 24 | Win | 22–1 (1) | Douglas Bellini | TKO | 5 (12) | 1998-01-30 | Berdux Filmstudios, Munich, Germany | Won vacant WBO Inter-Continental welterweight title |
| 23 | NC | 21–1 (1) | Michele Cusumano | ND | 3 (?) | 1997-11-29 | Rheinstrandhalle, Karlsruhe, Germany | |
| 22 | Win | 21–1 | Juraj Kurti | KO | 1 (?) | 1997-06-27 | Oberrheinhalle, Offenburg, Germany | |
| 21 | Win | 20–1 | Donald Jenkins | TKO | 3 (?) | 1997-06-14 | Saaltheater Geulen, Aachen, Germany | |
| 20 | Win | 19–1 | Anthony Ivory | PTS | 6 (6) | 1997-02-15 | Stadthalle, Cottbus, Germany | |
| 19 | Win | 18–1 | Aladar Horvath | KO | 2 (?) | 1997-01-25 | Maritim Hotel, Stuttgart, Germany | |
| 18 | Win | 17–1 | Leroy Owens | PTS | 8 (8) | 1995-11-25 | Stadthalle, Braunschweig, Germany | |
| 17 | Win | 16–1 | Jorge Ramirez | UD | 8 (8) | 1995-11-04 | Sartory-Saal, Cologne, Germany | |
| 16 | Win | 15–1 | Anthony Ivory | PTS | 8 (8) | 1995-10-07 | Festhalle, Frankfurt, Germany | |
| 15 | Win | 14–1 | Mark Ramsey | KO | 6 (12) | 1995-05-20 | Sporthalle, Alsterdorf, Germany | |
| 14 | Win | 13–1 | David Taylor | UD | 8 (8) | 1995-03-11 | Deutz Sporthalle, Cologne, Germany | |
| 13 | Win | 12–1 | Mike Powell | KO | 2 (8) | 1995-01-28 | Sporthalle, Schoeneberg, Germany | |
| 12 | Win | 11–1 | Steve McGovern | TKO | 4 (?) | 1994-12-17 | Sporthalle, Alsterdorf, Germany | |
| 11 | Win | 10–1 | Gejza Stipak | TKO | 3 (?) | 1994-11-13 | Universum Gym, Wandsbek, Germany | |
| 10 | Win | 9–1 | Mark McCreath | TKO | 6 (8) | 1994-07-23 | Sportforum, Lichtenberg, Germany | |
| 9 | Win | 8–1 | Zdenek Vyskala | TKO | 1 (?) | 1994-06-25 | Schwante, Germany | |
| 8 | Win | 7–1 | Azedine Touati | KO | 4 (?) | 1994-04-23 | Sporthalle Bildungszentrum, Halle an der Saale, Germany | |
| 7 | Win | 6–1 | Stefan Magyar | TKO | 3 (?) | 1994-03-13 | Universum Gym, Hamburg, Germany | |
| 6 | Win | 5–1 | Laszlo Murguly | PTS | 6 (6) | 1994-02-19 | Germany | |
| 5 | Win | 4–1 | Joze Cupar | KO | 2 (?) | 1993-12-19 | Universum Gym, Hamburg, Germany | |
| 4 | Win | 3–1 | Reino van der Hoek | TKO | 6 (6) | 1993-10-02 | Barbarossa Halle, Kaiserslautern, Germany | |
| 3 | Loss | 2–1 | Viktor Baranov | UD | 10 (10) | 1992-02-25 | Soviet Wings Sport Palace, Moscow, Russia | For vacant Russian light-welterweight title |
| 2 | Win | 2–0 | Gregor Chtov | PTS | 6 (6) | 1991-11-19 | Moscow, Russia | |
| 1 | Win | 1–0 | Sergey Balalaev | PTS | 6 (6) | 1991-08-14 | Russia | |

== See also ==
- List of world welterweight boxing champions

Sporting positions
Regional boxing titles
| Vacant Title last held by Larry Barnes | WBO Inter-Continental welterweight champion January 30, 1998 – February 14, 1998; Won interim title | Vacant Title next held by Michel Trabant |
World boxing titles
| Vacant Title last held by Manning Galloway | WBO welterweight champion Interim title February 14, 1998 – 1998; Promoted | Vacant Title next held by Kermit Cintrón |
| Preceded by Mihai Leu; Retired | WBO welterweight champion 1998 – May 6, 2000 | Succeeded by Daniel Santos |
