= Tom Meadows =

Tom Meadows may refer to:

- Tom Meadows, character in 31 North 62 East
- Tom Meadows (boxer), see Paddy Duffy
- Tom Meadows (coach), see Ron Balicki
- Thomas Meadows, Freight forwarder
