= Francisco Sierra (boxer) =

Mexican boxer

Personal information
- Nickname: Panchito
- Born: Francisco Santiago Sierra Ledezma; December 28, 1987 (age 38) San Francisco Coacalco, State of Mexico, Mexico
- Height: 6 ft 1 in (1.85 m)
- Weight: Super Middleweight

Boxing career
- Reach: 74 in (189 cm)
- Stance: orthodox

Boxing record
- Total fights: 37
- Wins: 26
- Win by KO: 23
- Losses: 10
- Draws: 1
- No contests: 0

Francisco Santiago Sierra Ledezma (born December 28, 1987) is a Mexican professional boxer.

== Professional career ==
Sierra lost a by knockout to Edison Miranda at Tachi Palace Hotel & Casino in Lemoore, California for the interim WBO NABO super middleweight title on October 22, 2009.

Panchito upset the return of former WBO World Champion Jose Luis Lopez in a 6-round TKO.

On July 30, 2009, Sierra won undefeated Super Middleweight contender, Don George (20–0–1, 17KO's) by Technical Decision at the Buffalo Run Casino, Miami, Oklahoma for the vacant WBO NABO super middleweight title. George went down once in the 7 round. Sierra went on to win on points but, because he had struck him after the bell had rung he was docked two points.

== Professional boxing record ==
Result	Opponent	Type	Rd., Time	Date	Location	Notes
Loss	(United States) Marcus Browne	TKO	4 (10), 0:01	2015-12-05	(United States) Barclays Center, Brooklyn, New York, U.S.	
Loss	(Ukraine) Oleksandr Gvozdyk	RTD	5 (8), 3:00	2015-09-19	(United States) Sportsmans Lodge, Studio City, California, U.S.	
Loss	(Sweden) Badou Jack	TKO	6 (10), 1:58	2014-12-12	(United States) Alamodome, San Antonio, Texas, U.S.	
Win	(Mexico) Francisco Rios	RTD	5 (8), 3:00	2014-11-14	Golden Lion Casino, Mexicali, Mexico	
Loss	(Mexico) Marco Antonio Periban	MD	10	2012-11-17	(Mexico) Teatro del Pueblo, Cuautlancingo	
Loss	(United Kingdom) George Groves	TKO	6 (10), 2:15	2012-07-28	(United States) HP Pavilion, San Jose, California, U.S.	
Win	(Mexico) Rogelio Ruvalcaba	UD	6	2012-06-02	El Foro, Tijuana, Mexico	
Loss	(South Africa) Thomas Oosthuizen	TKO	11 (12), 2:59	2011-11-23	Emperors Palace, Kempton Park, South Africa	For IBO Super Middleweight Title.
Loss	(United States) Jesús González	UD	12 (12)	2011-07-08	(United States) US Airway Centre, Phoenix, Arizona, U.S.	For vacant NABF Super Middleweight Title.
Win	(Mexico) Ulises Duarte	KO	2 (8)	2011-05-21	Arena Jorge Cuesy Serrano, Tuxtla Gutierrez, Mexico	
Draw	(United States) Dyah Davis	MD	10	2011-02-05	(United States) Maywood Activity Center, Maywood, California, U.S.	
Win	(Mexico) Ricardo Campillo	KO	1 (8), 2:38	2010-09-15	El Palenque de la Feria, Tepic, Nayarit, Mexico	
Win	(United States) Don George	TD	7 (10)	2010-07-30	(United States) Buffalo Run Casino, Miami, Oklahoma, U.S.	Won vacant WBO NABO super middleweight title.
Win	(Mexico) Jose Luis Lopez	RTD	5 (8), 3:00	2010-05-29	Sports Center Fair, Leon, Guanajuato, Mexico	
Loss	(Colombia) Edison Miranda	KO	1 (12), 2:16	2009-10-22	(United States) Tachi Palace Hotel & Casino, Lemoore, California, U.S.	For interim WBO NABO super middleweight title.
Win	(Mexico) Roberto Baro	KO	3 (12)	2009-03-07	Gimnasio INDEJ, Tepic, Nayarit, Mexico	Won vacant Mexico super middleweight title.
Win	(Mexico) Octavio Castro	KO	2 (10)	2008-12-06	Palenque de la Feria, Lagos de Moreno, Jalisco, Mexico	
Win	(Mexico) Eduardo Ayala	TKO	2 (6), 1:00	2008-11-02	La Feria de San Marcos, Aguascalientes, Aguascalientes, Mexico	
Win	(Mexico) Javier De la Rosa	RTD	2 (8), 3:00	2008-06-21	Auditorio Municipal, Tijuana, Baja California, Mexico	
Win	(Mexico) Carlos Parra	KO	6 (8), 1:06	2008-04-26	Plaza de Toros Juriquilla, Querétaro, Querétaro, Mexico	
Win	(Costa Rica) Henry Porras	TKO	9 (10), 1:08	2008-02-16	Gimnasio Nacional, San Jose, Costa Rica	
Win	(Mexico) Roberto Lopez	RTD	2 (6), 3:00	2007-10-26	Auditorio el Barretal, Tijuana, Baja California, Mexico	
Win	(Mexico) Esteban Camou	RTD	6 (12), 3:00	2007-07-20	Forum del Mayo, Navojoa, Sonora, Mexico	Won Mexico super middleweight title.
Win	(Mexico) Mike Bryan	KO	1 (10)	2007-04-27	Puerto Vallarta, Jalisco, Mexico	
Loss	(Mexico) Rigoberto Alvarez	KO	10 (10)	2006-12-15	Guadalajara, Jalisco, Mexico	
Win	(Mexico) Iran Rodriguez	TKO	6 (12)	2006-09-09	Puerto Vallarta, Jalisco, Mexico	Won WBC FECARBOX Light Heavyweight title.
Win	(Mexico) Luis Montoya	KO	2 (10)	2006-08-18	Arena Coliseo, Monterrey, Nuevo León, Mexico	
Win	(Mexico) Jose Arelis Lopez	KO	2 (10)	2006-07-28	Mexico	
Win	(Mexico) Juventino Barrera	KO	10 (10)	2006-06-01	Tepic, Nayarit, Mexico	
Loss	(Mexico) Rigoberto Alvarez	PTS	12	2006-04-15	Tuxpan, Nayarit, Mexico	
Win	(Mexico) Ramon Mendivil	KO	1 (10)	2006-03-18	Tuxpan, Nayarit, Mexico	
Win	(Mexico) Jaime Enriquez	KO	1 (10)	2006-02-25	Tuxpan, Nayarit, Mexico	
Win	(Mexico) Juan Carlos Sanchez	KO	3 (8)	2006-01-21	Tuxpan, Nayarit, Mexico	
Win	(Mexico) Iran Rodriguez	MD	8	2005-12-17	Collage Club, Puerto Vallarta, Jalisco, Mexico	
Win	(Mexico) Fabian Pina	KO	5 (6)	2005-11-18	Tepic, Nayarit, Mexico	
Win	(Mexico) Fernando Canelero	KO	2 (4)	2005-10-01	El Palenque de la Feria, Tepic, Nayarit, Mexico	
Win	(Mexico) Juan Carlos Sanchez	KO	3 (4)	2005-09-17	Villa Hidalgo, Jalisco, Mexico	
