= Gert Bo Jacobsen =

Danish boxer

Personal information
- Born: December 28, 1961 (age 64) Østrup, Denmark
- Height: 5 ft 9 1/2 in (177 cm)
- Weight: Lightweight; Light welterweight; Welterweight

Boxing career
- Stance: Orthodox

Boxing record
- Total fights: 49
- Wins: 43
- Win by KO: 30
- Losses: 5
- No contests: 1

Gert Bo Jacobsen (born 28 December 1961) is a Danish former professional boxer who competed between 1982 and 1995. He held the WBO welterweight title from February to October 1993.

== Professional career ==
Jacobsen turned professional in 1982 & compiled a record of 26–0 before facing for the IBF lightweight title, he would lose via tenth round stoppage.

Jacobsen's greatest fights were against Manning Galloway which were all fought in Randers Hallen, Randers, Denmark. The first fight, Jacobsen lost due to a corner retirement, the second fight was a no contest, but Jacobsen finally won the WBO welterweight title from Galloway in the 3rd fight by a decision. He was stripped of the title after being forced to withdraw from a fight against Eamonn Loughran because of suffering from the flu.

== Professional boxing record ==
49 fights	43 wins	5 losses
By knockout	30	5
By decision	12	0
By disqualification	1	0
No contests	1	

No.	Result	Record	Opponent	Type	Round, time	Date	Location	Notes
49	Loss	43–5 (1)	Khalid Rahilou	TKO	9 (12)	28 Apr 1995	Randers Hallen, Randers, Denmark	For EBU light-welterweight title
48	Win	43–4 (1)	Shawn Spinda	KO	1 (8)	17 Mar 1995	K.B. Hallen, Copenhagen, Denmark	
47	Win	42–4 (1)	Mike Bryan	TKO	1 (8)	13 Jan 1995	Aalborg Hallen, Aalborg, Denmark	
46	Loss	41–4 (1)	Khalid Rahilou	TKO	3 (12)	11 Nov 1994	Randers Hallen, Randers, Denmark	For EBU light-welterweight title
45	Win	41–3 (1)	George Sams	KO	1 (8)	16 Sep 1994	Aalborg Hallen, Aalborg, Denmark	
44	Win	40–3 (1)	Jackie Beard	KO	3 (8)	10 Jun 1994	Kolding Hallen, Kolding, Denmark	
43	Win	39–3 (1)	David Santos	DQ	6 (8)	22 Apr 1994	Aalborg Hallen, Aalborg, Denmark	
42	Win	38–3 (1)	Terry Ford	KO	3 (8)	25 Mar 1994	Aakirkeby Hallerne, Aakirkeby, Denmark	
41	Win	37–3 (1)	Johar Abu Lashin	TKO	2 (8)	18 Feb 1994	Randers Hallen, Randers, Denmark	
40	Win	36–3 (1)	Roland Commings	PTS	8	3 Dec 1993	Randers Hallen, Randers, Denmark	
39	Win	35–3 (1)	Robert Campos	KO	3 (8)	17 Sep 1993	Circus Building, Copenhagen, Denmark	
38	Win	34–3 (1)	David Taylor	UD	8	11 Jun 1993	Randers Hallen, Randers, Denmark	
37	Win	33–3 (1)	Bobby Butters	TKO	6 (8)	26 Mar 1993	Circus Building, Copenhagen, Denmark	
36	Win	32–3 (1)	Manning Galloway	UD	12	12 Feb 1993	Randers Hallen, Randers, Denmark	Won WBO welterweight title
35	NC	31–3 (1)	Manning Galloway	NC	1 (12)	27 Nov 1992	Randers Hallen, Randers, Denmark	For WBO welterweight title; The bout was declared a no-contest due to clash of heads
34	Win	31–3	Rocky Berg	KO	1 (8)	4 Sep 1992	Parken Stadium, Copenhagen, Denmark	
33	Win	30–3	William Betts	KO	1 (8)	4 Jun 1992	Randers Hallen, Randers, Denmark	
32	Loss	29–3	Manning Galloway	RTD	8 (12)	15 Feb 1991	Randers Hallen, Randers, Denmark	For WBO welterweight title
31	Win	29–2	Felix Dubray	KO	5 (8)	8 Dec 1990	Aalborg Hallen, Aalborg, Denmark	
30	Win	28–2	Jeff Bumpus	KO	4 (8)	19 Oct 1990	Skive Hallerne, Skive, Denmark	
29	Win	27–2	Keheven Johnson	KO	1 (8)	17 May 1990	Nordjysk Messecenter, Aars, Denmark	
28	Loss	26–2	Poli Díaz	TKO	6 (12)	14 Jun 1989	Palacio de los Deportes, Madrid, Spain	For EBU lightweight title
27	Loss	26–1	Greg Haugen	TKO	10 (12)	28 Oct 1988	Brøndby Hall, Copenhagen, Denmark	For IBF lightweight title
26	Win	26–0	Marvin Garris	PTS	8	12 May 1988	Idrætshuset, Copenhagen, Denmark	
25	Win	25–0	Joey Medina	TKO	7 (8)	5 Feb 1988	Caesars Palace, Paradise, Nevada, U.S.	
24	Win	24–0	Herbie Bivalacqua	KO	4 (8)	15 Jan 1988	Skive Hallerne, Skive, Denmark	
23	Win	23–0	Claudio Nitti	KO	4 (12)	2 Oct 1987	Idrætshuset, Copenhagen, Denmark	Retained EBU lightweight title
22	Win	22–0	Alain Simoes	TKO	8 (12)	8 Jun 1987	Mérignac, Gironde, France	Retained EBU lightweight title
21	Win	21–0	Felipe Julio	TKO	5 (10)	28 Mar 1987	K.B. Hallen, Copenhagen, Denmark	
20	Win	20–0	José Antonio Hernando	UD	12	27 Feb 1987	Randers Hallen, Randers, Denmark	Retained EBU lightweight title
19	Win	19–0	Joey Joynson	KO	1 (8)	6 Feb 1987	Herning Kongrescenter, Herning, Denmark	
18	Win	18–0	Fernando Blanco	UD	12	17 Oct 1986	Randers Hallen, Randers, Denmark	Retained EBU lightweight title
17	Win	17–0	Alfred Raininger	UD	12	18 Apr 1986	Randers Hallen, Randers, Denmark	Retained EBU lightweight title
16	Win	16–0	René Weller	TKO	8 (12)	10 Jan 1986	Randers Hallen, Randers, Denmark	Won EBU lightweight title
15	Win	15–0	Rene Nelson Trujillo	TKO	10 (10)	7 Dec 1985	Circus Building, Copenhagen, Denmark	
14	Win	14–0	José Antonio Garcia	TKO	2 (8)	1 Nov 1985	Idrætshuset, Copenhagen, Denmark	
13	Win	13–0	Claude Lancastre	KO	4 (8)	20 Jun 1985	Idrætshuset, Copenhagen, Denmark	
12	Win	12–0	José Ortiz	KO	2 (8)	9 Mar 1985	K.B. Hallen, Copenhagen, Denmark	
11	Win	11–0	Vicente Jorge	PTS	8	9 Nov 1984	K.B. Hallen, Copenhagen, Denmark	
10	Win	10–0	Jesus Matilla	TKO	3 (8)	5 Oct 1984	Randers Hallen, Randers, Denmark	
9	Win	9–0	José Luis Vicho	PTS	8	18 Feb 1984	Idrætshuset, Copenhagen, Denmark	
8	Win	8–0	Charles Jurietti	KO	1 (8)	13 Jan 1984	Randers Hallen, Randers, Denmark	
7	Win	7–0	Aldo Di Benedetto	KO	2 (8)	1 Dec 1983	Idrætshuset, Copenhagen, Denmark	
6	Win	6–0	Gary Lucas	KO	4 (6)	6 Oct 1983	Idrætshuset, Copenhagen, Denmark	
5	Win	5–0	Hugo Carrizo	PTS	6	8 Apr 1983	K.B. Hallen, Copenhagen, Denmark	
4	Win	4–0	Eddie Morgan	KO	3 (4)	11 Feb 1983	K.B. Hallen, Copenhagen, Denmark	
3	Win	3–0	Benito Murillo	PTS	4	2 Dec 1982	Randers Hallen, Randers, Denmark	
2	Win	2–0	Gilbert Helluin	PTS	4	5 Nov 1982	K.B. Hallen, Copenhagen, Denmark	
1	Win	1–0	Chris McCallum	KO	1 (4)	7 Oct 1982	K.B. Hallen, Copenhagen, Denmark	

== Personal life ==
Jacobsen appeared in a television show named Dalton, that was shown in Denmark in 1993.

Jacobsen owns an auto shop in Denmark.

== See also ==
- List of Danish world boxing champions
- List of world welterweight boxing champions

Sporting positions
Regional boxing titles
Preceded by René Weller	European lightweight champion 10 January 1986 – 1988; Vacated	Vacant Title next held by René Weller
World boxing titles
Preceded by Manning Galloway	WBO welterweight champion 12 February 1993 – 13 October 1993; Stripped	Vacant Title next held by Eamonn Loughran
