= Manning Galloway =

American boxer

Personal information
- Nickname: The Spoiler
- Born: April 27, 1960 (age 66) Columbus, Ohio, U.S.
- Height: 5 ft 9 in (175 cm)
- Weight: Light welterweight; Welterweight; Light middleweight

Boxing career
- Stance: Southpaw

Boxing record
- Total fights: 85
- Wins: 63
- Win by KO: 14
- Losses: 19
- Draws: 1
- No contests: 2

Manning Galloway (born April 27, 1960) is the former WBO welterweight champion of the world.

== Professional career ==
Galloway turned professional in 1978 & compiled a record of 42–11–1 before beating Veabro Boykin to win the vacant WBO welterweight title. He defended the title seven times including against Englishman Pat Barrett, and Danish contender Gert Bo Jacobsen, first with a corner retirement then via a no contest. He would lose the title in his next fight, a third encounter with Jacobsen on points.

== Professional boxing record ==
85 fights	63 wins	19 losses
By knockout	14	6
By decision	49	13
Draws	1	
No contests	2	

No.	Result	Record	Opponent	Type	Round, time	Date	Location	Notes
85	Loss	63–19–1 (2)	Saúl Román	TKO	7 (8)	2006-02-25	Emerald Queen Casino, Tacoma, Washington, U.S.	
84	NC	63–18–1 (2)	Lenord Pierre	NC	4 (8)	2005-10-07	Monticello Raceway, Monticello, New York, U.S.	
83	Loss	63–18–1 (1)	Mihaly Kotai	KO	7 (12)	2004-12-18	Bujtosi Fitness Centrum, Nyíregyháza, Hungary	For World Boxing Foundation light-middleweight title
82	Win	63–17–1 (1)	Said Ouali	UD	8 (8)	2004-08-10	Essex County College, Newark, New Jersey, U.S.	
81	Win	62–17–1 (1)	Bryon Mackie	SD	8 (8)	2004-04-17	Hershey Centre, Mississauga, Ontario, Canada	
80	Win	61–17–1 (1)	Ricardo Williams	SD	10 (10)	2004-04-03	Mitchell Armory, Cincinnati, Ohio, U.S.	
79	Loss	60–17–1 (1)	Troy Rowland	MD	10 (10)	2004-02-13	DeltaPlex Arena, Walker, Michigan, U.S.	
78	Loss	60–16–1 (1)	Rodney Jones	KO	6 (10)	2003-09-25	Memorial Civic Auditorium, Stockton, California, U.S.	
77	Win	60–15–1 (1)	Joe Haynes	UD	6 (6)	2003-06-26	PromoWest Pavilion, Columbus, Ohio, U.S.	
76	Loss	59–15–1 (1)	Emmett Linton	MD	10 (10)	2003-01-23	Convention Center, Charlotte, North Carolina, U.S.	
75	Win	59–14–1 (1)	Ed Lee Humes	TKO	2 (6)	2002-07-11	The Big Easy, Reynoldsburg, Ohio, U.S.	
74	Win	58–14–1 (1)	Marlon Thomas	SD	8 (8)	2002-01-31	The Roostertail, Detroit, Michigan, U.S.	
73	Win	57–14–1 (1)	Dennis Lowe	PTS	6 (6)	2001-10-20	Akron, Ohio, U.S.	
72	Win	56–14–1 (1)	Jerome Davis	UD	4 (4)	2001-08-03	Robarts Arena, Sarasota, Florida, U.S.	
71	Loss	55–14–1 (1)	Aaron Mitchell	RTD	5 (8)	2001-06-21	Michael's Eighth Avenue, Glen Burnie, Maryland, U.S.	
70	Win	55–13–1 (1)	Sean Crowdus	TKO	3 (6)	2000-04-27	Club Dance, Reynoldsburg, Ohio, U.S.	
69	Win	54–13–1 (1)	Robert West	PTS	10 (10)	1995-07-22	Veterans Memorial Auditorium, Columbus, Ohio, U.S.	
68	Win	53–13–1 (1)	Reggie Strickland	UD	6 (6)	1995-03-29	Shoemaker Center, Cincinnati, Ohio, U.S.	
67	Loss	52–13–1 (1)	Eamonn Loughran	TD	4 (12)	1994-12-10	G-Mex Centre, Manchester, England, U.K.	For WBO welterweight title
66	Win	52–12–1 (1)	Anthony Jones	TKO	6 (12)	1994-08-13	Coliseo Rubén Rodríguez, Bayamón, Puerto Rico	Won interim WBO welterweight title
65	Win	51–12–1 (1)	Tim Payton	TKO	7 (?)	1994-06-10	Erie, Pennsylvania, U.S.	
64	Loss	50–12–1 (1)	Gert Bo Jacobsen	UD	12 (12)	1993-02-12	Arena Randers, Randers, Denmark	Lost WBO welterweight title
63	NC	50–11–1 (1)	Gert Bo Jacobsen	NC	1 (12)	1992-11-27	Arena Randers, Randers, Denmark	Retained WBO welterweight title
62	Win	50–11–1	Pat Barrett	UD	12 (12)	1992-07-25	G-Mex Centre, Manchester, England, U.K.	Retained WBO welterweight title
61	Win	49–11–1	Nika Khumalo	SD	12 (12)	1991-12-14	Green Point Stadium, Cape Town, South Africa	Retained WBO welterweight title
60	Win	48–11–1	Jeff Malcolm	UD	12 (12)	1991-09-15	Jupiters Hotel & Casino, Broadbeach, Australia	Retained WBO welterweight title
59	Win	47–11–1	Racheed Lawal	RTD	7 (12)	1991-05-17	K.B. Hallen, Copenhagen, Denmark	Retained WBO welterweight title
58	Win	46–11–1	Gert Bo Jacobsen	RTD	8 (12)	1991-02-15	Arena Randers, Randers, Denmark	Retained WBO welterweight title
57	Win	45–11–1	Nika Khumalo	UD	12 (12)	1990-08-25	Central Maine Civic Center, Lewiston, Maine, U.S.	Retained WBO welterweight title
56	Win	44–11–1	Juan Estrada	TKO	8 (10)	1990-06-23	Longhorn Ballroom, Dallas, Texas, U.S.	
55	Win	43–11–1	Veabro Boykin	PTS	12 (12)	1989-12-15	Yabucoa, Puerto Rico	Won vacant WBO welterweight title
54	Win	42–11–1	Eric Hernandez	UD	12 (12)	1989-03-31	Bally's Las Vegas, Paradise, Nevada, U.S.	Retained USBA welterweight title
53	Win	41–11–1	Said Skouma	MD	10 (10)	1989-01-23	Stade Pierre de Coubertin, Paris, France	
52	Win	40–11–1	Charles Hollis	UD	10 (10)	1988-12-05	Harvey Hall, Tyler, Texas, U.S.	
51	Win	39–11–1	Rollin Williams	MD	12 (12)	1988-07-06	Bingo Wonderland, Houston, Texas, U.S.	Won USBA welterweight title
50	Win	38–11–1	Anthony Releford	TKO	7 (8)	1988-05-10	Bingo Wonderland, Houston, Texas, U.S.	
49	Win	37–11–1	Oscar Pena	UD	8 (8)	1988-01-14	Houston, Texas, U.S.	
48	Win	36–11–1	Milton Seward	PTS	6 (6)	1987-09-21	Jackie Lee Entertainment Center, Akron, Ohio, U.S.	
47	Loss	35–11–1	Young Dick Tiger	UD	12 (12)	1987-04-27	The Forum, Inglewood, California, U.S.	For vacant CSAC welterweight title
46	Loss	35–10–1	Luis Santana	TD	8 (10)	1986-06-25	The Forum, Inglewood, California, U.S.	
45	Win	35–9–1	Veabro Boykin	UD	10 (10)	1986-05-20	Americana Congress Hotel, Chicago, Illinois, U.S.	
44	Win	34–9–1	Diomedes Colome	UD	12 (12)	1985-12-17	The Forum, Inglewood, California, U.S.	Won vacant Mid American welterweight title
43	Win	33–9–1	Jerome Kinney	MD	10 (10)	1985-11-21	The Forum, Inglewood, California, U.S.	
42	Win	32–9–1	Al Long	SD	10 (10)	1985-08-20	The Forum, Inglewood, California, U.S.	
41	Win	31–9–1	Sammy Brooks	SD	10 (10)	1985-07-13	Convention Center, Oklahoma City, Oklahoma, U.S.	
40	Win	30–9–1	Lloyd Taylor	PTS	10 (10)	1985-04-04	Washington, D.C., U.S.	
39	Win	29–9–1	Earl Caldwell	TKO	4 (?)	1984-10-18	Columbus, Ohio, U.S.	
38	Win	28–9–1	Alonso Cates	PTS	8 (8)	1984-07-09	East Dallas Club, Columbus, Ohio, U.S.	
37	Win	27–9–1	Earl Caldwell	PTS	8 (8)	1984-05-21	East Dallas Club, Columbus, Ohio, U.S.	
36	Win	26–9–1	Sam Gervins	TKO	7 (8)	1984-04-30	East Dallas Club, Columbus, Ohio, U.S.	
35	Win	25–9–1	Greg Harper	KO	8 (8)	1984-03-12	East Dallas Club, Columbus, Ohio, U.S.	
34	Win	24–9–1	Forrest Pitts	TKO	8 (8)	1984-02-06	East Dallas Club, Columbus, Ohio, U.S.	
33	Win	23–9–1	Greg Netter	PTS	8 (8)	1983-12-19	Columbus, Ohio, U.S.	
32	Win	22–9–1	Kenny Snow	UD	10 (10)	1983-12-02	Curtis Hixon Hall, Tampa, Florida, U.S.	
31	Loss	21–9–1	Nino La Rocca	UD	8 (8)	1983-10-08	Saint-Vincent, Italy	
30	Win	21–8–1	Darnell Knox	SD	10 (10)	1983-04-05	The Breakaway Night Club, Akron, Ohio, U.S.	
29	Win	20–8–1	Dennis Fain	UD	10 (10)	1983-02-04	Cascade Holiday Inn, Akron, Ohio, U.S.	
28	Loss	19–8–1	Calvin Porter	UD	8 (8)	1982-10-23	Lancaster Host Resort, Lancaster, Pennsylvania, U.S.	
27	Win	19–7–1	Dennis Fain	SD	12 (12)	1982-10-14	Cascade Holiday Inn, Akron, Ohio, U.S.	Won vacant Ohio Athletic Commission light-middleweight title
26	Loss	18–7–1	Charlie Weir	TKO	7 (10)	1982-10-02	Ellis Park Tennis Stadium, Johannesburg, South Africa	
25	Win	18–6–1	Lloyd Taylor	UD	8 (8)	1982-07-16	Hyatt Regency, Washington, D.C., U.S.	
24	Draw	17–6–1	Roy Gumbs	PTS	10 (10)	1982-04-16	Massey Hall, Toronto, Ontario, Canada	
23	Win	17–6	Wendell Rutledge	TKO	2 (?)	1982-03-05	Memorial Arena, Johnstown, Pennsylvania, U.S.	
22	Win	16–6	Greg Netter	UD	8 (8)	1982-01-23	Morgan High School, McConnelsville, Ohio, U.S.	
21	Win	15–6	Jerome Kinney	PTS	8 (8)	1981-09-10	The 20 Grand, Detroit, Michigan, U.S.	
20	Win	14–6	Art Harris	SD	10 (10)	1981-04-26	Memorial Civic Center, Canton, Ohio, U.S.	
19	Win	13–6	Bruce Johnson	UD	10 (10)	1981-04-02	Curtis Hixon Hall, Tampa, Florida, U.S.	
18	Loss	12–6	Willie Rodriguez	UD	12 (12)	1981-01-08	Ohio Convention Center, Columbus, Ohio, U.S.	For vacant Ohio Athletic Commission light-welterweight title
17	Win	12–5	Shelby Wilkerson	UD	8 (8)	1980-11-29	Huntington, West Virginia, U.S.	
16	Win	11–5	Don Morgan	PTS	8 (8)	1980-10-04	East High School Gym, Morristown, Tennessee, U.S.	
15	Loss	10–5	Danny Paul	PTS	8 (8)	1980-05-30	Wyandotte, Michigan, U.S.	
14	Loss	10–4	Curtis Taylor	KO	2 (10)	1980-05-16	Rupp Arena, Lexington, Kentucky, U.S.	
13	Loss	10–3	W C Honeycutt	PTS	6 (6)	1980-03-29	Detroit, Michigan, U.S.	
12	Win	10–2	Tony Taylor	PTS	10 (10)	1980-03-01	State Fairgrounds Arena, Columbus, Ohio, U.S.	
11	Win	9–2	Dale Gordon	UD	6 (6)	1980-02-09	Nathan Goff Armory, Clarksburg, West Virginia, U.S.	
10	Win	8–2	Greg Netter	UD	10 (10)	1979-12-28	Veterans Memorial Auditorium, Columbus, Ohio, U.S.	Won vacant Ohio Athletic Commission welterweight title
9	Win	7–2	Woody Harris	PTS	6 (6)	1979-12-01	Northwest Activities Center, Detroit, Michigan, U.S.	
8	Win	6–2	Larry McCall	UD	8 (8)	1979-09-30	Memorial Civic Center, Canton, Ohio, U.S.	
7	Win	5–2	Calvin Straughter	PTS	4 (4)	1979-08-01	Columbus, Ohio, U.S.	
6	Win	4–2	Phil Batie	KO	2 (6)	1979-06-28	Lausche Building, Columbus, Ohio, U.S.	
5	Loss	3–2	Forrest Winchester	PTS	6 (6)	1979-05-17	Rhodes Center, Columbus, Ohio, U.S.	
4	Win	3–1	Calvin Straughter	PTS	6 (6)	1979-05-09	Veterans Memorial Auditorium, Columbus, Ohio, U.S.	
3	Loss	2–1	Mike Blunt	PTS	6 (6)	1979-04-27	Convention Center, Dayton, Ohio, U.S.	
2	Win	2–0	Melvin Hauser	PTS	6 (6)	1979-01-24	Masonic Auditorium, Cleveland, Ohio, U.S.	
1	Win	1–0	Eugene Ellington	PTS	6 (6)	1978-12-06	Masonic Auditorium, Cleveland, Ohio, U.S.	

== See also ==
- List of southpaw stance boxers
- List of world welterweight boxing champions

Sporting positions
Regional boxing titles
Vacant Title last held by Jack Manley	Ohio Athletic Commission welterweight champion December 28, 1979 – October 14, 1982; Won light-middleweight title	Vacant Title next held by Tommy Ayers
New title	Ohio Athletic Commission light-middleweight champion October 14, 1982 – December 15, 1989; Won world title	Vacant Title next held by Henry Hughes
New title	Mid American welterweight champion December 17, 1985 – 1989; Vacated	Vacant Title next held by Greg Dickson
Preceded by Rollin Williams	USBA welterweight champion July 6, 1988 – December 15, 1989; Won world title	Vacant Title next held by Glenwood Brown
World boxing titles
Vacant Title last held by Genaro León	WBO welterweight champion December 15, 1989 – February 12, 1993	Succeeded by Gert Bo Jacobsen
New title	WBO welterweight champion Interim title August 13, 1994 – December 10, 1994; Lost bid for full title	Vacant Title next held by Akhmed Kotiev
