= James Page (boxer) =

American boxer (born 1971)

Personal information
- Nickname: Mighty Quinn
- Born: James Quindale Page; April 1, 1971 (age 55) Pittsburg, California, U.S.
- Height: 5 ft 11 in (180 cm)
- Weight: Welterweight

Boxing career
- Reach: 73 in (185 cm)
- Stance: Orthodox

Boxing record
- Total fights: 30
- Wins: 25
- Win by KO: 19
- Losses: 5

James Page (born April 1, 1971) is an American former professional boxer who competed from 1990 to 2012. He held the World Boxing Association (WBA) welterweight title from 1998 to 2000.

== Pro boxing career ==
Nicknamed "Mighty Quinn", Page turned pro in 1990 and beat Andrei Pestriaev in 1998 to capture the Vacant WBA Welterweight Title. He defended the title three times until he was stripped, in 2000, for failing to turn up for a mandatory title defense in Las Vegas. Page fought for the Vacant WBA Welterweight Title yet again, against Andrew Lewis in 2001. Page lost via TKO in the 7th round. He retired after the bout.

== Professional boxing record ==
30 fights	25 wins	5 losses
By knockout	19	2
By decision	6	3

No.	Result	Record	Opponent	Type	Round(s), time	Date	Age	Location	Notes
30	Loss	25–5	Rahman Mustafa Yusubov	TKO	2 (6), 1:31	Nov 17, 2012	41 years, 230 days	Four Points by Sheraton, Sacramento, California, U.S.	
29	Loss	25–4	Andrew Lewis	TKO	7 (12), 1:13	Feb 17, 2001	29 years, 322 days	MGM Grand Garden Arena, Las Vegas, Nevada, U.S.	For vacant WBA welterweight title
28	Win	25–3	Freddie Pendleton	TKO	11 (12), 2:25	Jul 24, 1999	28 years, 114 days	Flamingo Hilton, Paradise, Nevada, U.S.	Retained WBA welterweight title
27	Win	24–3	Sam Garr	UD	12	Mar 13, 1999	27 years, 348 days	Madison Square Garden, New York City, New York, U.S.	Retained WBA welterweight title
26	Win	23–3	José Luis López	UD	12	Dec 5, 1998	27 years, 248 days	Convention Center, Atlantic City, New Jersey, U.S.	Retained WBA welterweight title
25	Win	22–3	Andrey Pestryayev	KO	2 (12), 0:45	Oct 10, 1998	27 years, 192 days	Palais Omnisport de Paris-Bercy, Paris, France	Won vacant WBA welterweight title
24	Win	21–3	Anthony Perry	TKO	6 (12), 2:29	Aug 29, 1998	27 years, 150 days	Las Vegas Hilton, Winchester, Nevada, U.S.	Retained WBA Fedelatin welterweight title
23	Win	20–3	Eric Alexander	KO	5 (12), 1:05	May 29, 1998	27 years, 58 days	Las Vegas Hilton, Winchester, Nevada, U.S.	Retained WBA Fedelatin welterweight title
22	Win	19–3	Luis Carmona	TKO	3 (12), 0:35	Apr 3, 1998	27 years, 2 days	Coliseo Rubén Rodríguez, Bayamon, Puerto Rico	Won vacant WBA Fedelatin welterweight title
21	Win	18–3	Bill Bradley	TKO	1 (10), 0:35	Feb 21, 1998	26 years, 326 days	Miccosukee Resort & Gaming, Miami, Florida, U.S.	
20	Loss	17–3	Robert West	SD	10	Aug 9, 1996	25 years, 130 days	Casino Magic, Bay Saint Louis, Missouri, U.S.	
19	Win	17–2	Jaime Balboa	TKO	3 (10), 1:50	Jun 23, 1996	25 years, 83 days	Summit, Houston, Texas, U.S.	
18	Win	16–2	Ross Thompson	UD	10	Feb 25, 1996	24 years, 330 days	Arizona Charlie's, Las Vegas, Nevada, U.S.	
17	Win	15–2	Genaro Léon	TKO	2 (?)	Oct 27, 1995	24 years, 209 days	Pavilion, Concord, California, U.S.	
16	Win	14–2	Alberto Alcaraz	KO	2 (12)	Jun 29, 1995	24 years, 89 days	Concord Hilton, Concord, California, U.S.	
15	Win	13–2	Alfred Ankamah	TKO	1 (12), 2:23	Mar 6, 1995	23 years, 339 days	Great Western Forum, Inglewood, California, U.S.	
14	Win	12–2	Jose Munoz	KO	3 (?)	May 19, 1994	23 years, 48 days	Civic Auditorium, San Jose, California, U.S.	
13	Win	11–2	Rod Sequenan	UD	8	Mar 25, 1994	22 years, 358 days	Aladdin Hotel & Casino, Paradise, Nevada, U.S.	
12	Loss	10–2	Stevie Johnston	MD	8	Oct 22, 1993	22 years, 204 days	Civic Auditorium, Santa Cruz, California, U.S.	
11	Win	10–1	Augustine Renteria	RTD	3 (?)	Jul 16, 1993	22 years, 106 days	Expo Center, San Mateo, California, U.S.	
10	Win	9–1	Danny Perez	UD	10	Apr 29, 1993	22 years, 28 days	Marriott Hotel, Irvine, California, U.S.	
9	Win	8–1	Damon Franklin	KO	1 (?)	May 1, 1992	21 years, 30 days	Stockton, California, U.S.	
8	Loss	7–1	Zack Padilla	UD	6	Nov 15, 1991	20 years, 228 days	Civic Auditorium, San Francisco, California, U.S.	
7	Win	7–0	Hector Pena	KO	6 (6), 1:06	Oct 2, 1991	20 years, 184 days	Pavilion, Concord, California, U.S.	
6	Win	6–0	Peter Waswa	UD	6	Aug 6, 1991	20 years, 127 days	Civic Auditorium, San Francisco, California, U.S.	
5	Win	5–0	Jesus Magana	KO	1 (?)	Jun 21, 1991	20 years, 81 days	Civic Auditorium, San Jose, California, U.S.	
4	Win	4–0	Francisco Lopez	KO	2 (4)	Mar 2, 1991	19 years, 335 days	Exhibit Hall, San Jose, California, U.S.	
3	Win	3–0	Sergio Alonso	KO	2 (4)	Jan 31, 1991	19 years, 305 days	Fairmont Hotel, San Jose, California, U.S.	
2	Win	2–0	Rick Basler	TKO	1 (4), 1:14	Jan 15, 1991	19 years, 289 days	Bally's Hotel & Casino, Reno, Nevada, U.S.	
1	Win	1–0	Luis Silva	TKO	1 (4)	Dec 19, 1990	19 years, 262 days	Concord Hilton, Concord, California, U.S.	

== Troubles outside the ring ==
=== 2001 arrest ===
Page was arrested in December 2001, 45 minutes after he robbed a Bank of America Branch in Atlanta. Police said they saw his 1999 Cadillac, which he bought with his championship earnings, parked outside a bar four miles from the bank. They found almost $6,000 in his pocket.

Earlier that day, Page had attempted to rob another bank, according to court records, which said he also robbed an Alpharetta bank a week earlier. Page had previous convictions for robbery and drug offenses. He was sentenced to 11 years in Federal prison.

=== 2013 arrest ===
On June 10, 2013, Page, whose stint in prison had not reformed him, was arrested in West Oakland, California, as a result of the “button-down bandit” serial bank robber investigation. The "button-down bandit" was charged in connection with six bank robberies in the East San Francisco Bay Area between March and June 2013. In each robbery, the robber wore various button-down, collared, long-sleeved shirts, leading investigators to dub the suspect the “button-down bandit.” Surveillance photographs were disseminated to law enforcement agencies and the public during the investigation and led a police officer in Oakley to identify Page. The officer had previous law enforcement contact with Page during his patrols, according to the FBI. Page was arrested in connection with the robbing of two Chase Banks, three Wells Fargo Banks, two U.S. banks, and a Bank of America across the East Bay. Page was booked into the Martinez Detention Facility (MDF).

=== 2014 ===
On August 19, Page pleaded guilty to the San Francisco Bay Area bank robberies in February. A judge sentenced him to 7 years in prison.

== See also ==
- List of world welterweight boxing champions

Sporting positions
World boxing titles
Vacant Title last held by Ike Quartey	WBA welterweight champion October 10, 1998 – August 2000; Stripped	Vacant Title next held by Andrew Lewis
