= José Luis López (boxer) =

Mexican boxer

Personal information
- Nickname: Maestrito
- Born: May 28, 1973 (age 53) Durango, Durango, Mexico
- Height: 5 ft 8 in (173 cm)
- Weight: Welterweight

Boxing career
- Reach: 70 in (178 cm)
- Stance: Orthodox

Boxing record
- Total fights: 58
- Wins: 51
- Win by KO: 39
- Losses: 5
- Draws: 2

Jose Luis Lopez (born May 28, 1973) is a Mexican former professional boxer.

== Professional career ==
Lopez turned pro at the age of 15 in 1989 when he defeated Raul Contreras.

Handpicked as an "easy" opponent against then champion Eamonn Loughran in 1996, he knocked down the WBO Welterweight Champion three times and ended up winning by KO in the first round. After a win over Luis Ramon Campas, he relinquished the title. He then defeated former welterweight champion Jorge Vaca by technical knockout, and on June 7, 1997, he defeated another former welterweight champion Aaron Davis by decision.

Lopez drew against Ike Quartey in 1997 for the WBA welterweight title, in a fight where he spent most of the rounds languishing on the outside, only to come alive in the late rounds. Lopez put Quartey down in the 2nd and 11th. The fight initially awarded to Quartey by MD, changed after error in scoring discovered. In his last fight before a four year hiatus, he surprisingly lost a championship bout against underdog James Page for the WBA welterweight title in 1998, this despite Page being knocked down in rounds 3 and 9.

== Professional boxing record ==
58 fights	51 wins	5 losses
By knockout	39	1
By decision	11	4
By disqualification	1	0
Draws	2	

No.	Result	Record	Opponent	Type	Round, time	Date	Location	Notes
58	Win	51–5–2	Guadalupe Rodriguez	KO	1 (10)	2010-12-18	Palenque de la Feria, Durango, Mexico	
57	Loss	50–5–2	Francisco Sierra	RTD	5 (8)	2010-05-29	Fair Show Center, León, Mexico	
56	Win	50–4–2	Juan Carlos Barreto	TKO	1 (10)	2010-04-10	Palenque de la Feria, Durango, Mexico	
55	Win	49–4–2	Vinroy Barrett	UD	10 (10)	2005-10-14	Cicero Stadium, Cicero, Illinois, U.S.	
54	Win	48–4–2	Alberto Mercedes	KO	7 (8)	2005-05-07	Mandalay Bay Resort & Casino, Paradise, Nevada, U.S.	
53	Win	47–4–2	Hugo Lomeli	SD	10 (10)	2005-03-11	Restaurante Arroyo, Mexico City, Mexico	
52	Win	46–4–2	Warren Moore	TKO	4 (10)	2004-10-16	Oakland Arena, Oakland, California, U.S.	
51	Win	45–4–2	David Lewter	RTD	8 (10)	2000-12-01	MGM Grand Garden Arena, Paradise, Nevada, U.S.	
50	Win	44–4–2	Leroy Owens	KO	1 (?)	2000-05-06	Chihuahua, Mexico	
49	Loss	43–4–2	James Page	UD	12 (12)	1998-12-05	Boardwalk Hall, Atlantic City, New Jersey, U.S.	For WBA welterweight title
48	Win	43–3–2	Ed Goins	TKO	3 (10)	1998-08-22	Boardwalk Hall, Atlantic City, New Jersey, U.S.	
47	Win	42–3–2	Sammy Fuentes	TKO	2 (12)	1998-05-09	ARCO Arena, Sacramento, California, U.S.	
46	Win	41–3–2	Ron Johnson	TKO	5 (10)	1997-12-13	Foxwoods Resort Casino, Ledyard, Connecticut, U.S.	
45	Draw	40–3–2	Ike Quartey	MD	12 (12)	1997-10-17	Foxwoods Resort Casino, Ledyard, Connecticut, U.S.	For WBA welterweight title
44	Win	40–3–1	Aaron Davis	MD	10 (10)	1997-06-07	ARCO Arena, Sacramento, California, U.S.	
43	Win	39–3–1	Jorge Vaca	TKO	6 (10)	1997-03-25	Civic Auditorium, Oxnard, California, U.S.	
42	Win	38–3–1	Yori Boy Campas	RTD	5 (12)	1996-10-06	Sports Arena, Los Angeles, California, U.S.	Retained WBO welterweight title
41	Win	37–3–1	Eamonn Loughran	TKO	1 (12)	1996-04-13	Everton Park Sports Centre, Liverpool, England, U.K.	Won WBO welterweight title
40	Win	36–3–1	Oscar Burgos	KO	4 (?)	1996-03-15	Durango, Mexico	
39	Win	35–3–1	Ultiminio Segura	TKO	5 (?)	1995-10-20	Durango, Mexico	
38	Win	34–3–1	Gabino Mendoza	TKO	4 (12)	1995-08-04	Durango, Mexico	Retained Mexican welterweight title
37	Win	33–3–1	Arturo Lopez Trujillo	KO	2 (12)	1994-10-14	Durango, Mexico	Retained Mexican welterweight title
36	Win	32–3–1	Rene Francisco Herrera	UD	12 (12)	1994-03-25	Durango, Mexico	Won Mexican welterweight title
35	Loss	31–3–1	Rene Francisco Herrera	SD	12 (12)	1993-12-10	Ciudad Juárez, Mexico	For Mexican welterweight title
34	Win	31–2–1	Alberto Santana Llanes	KO	4 (?)	1993-07-02	Durango, Mexico	
33	Win	30–2–1	Rogelio Vigniolle	KO	2 (?)	1993-05-28	Durango, Mexico	
32	Win	29–2–1	Ignacio Jacome	TKO	4 (?)	1993-02-26	Durango, Mexico	
31	Draw	28–2–1	Hernan Gutierrez	PTS	10 (10)	1992-12-14	Frontón México, Mexico City, Mexico	
30	Loss	28–2	Juan Carlos Rodríguez	PTS	10 (10)	1992-08-24	Frontón México, Mexico City, Mexico	
29	Win	28–1	Mario Zarate	DQ	3 (4)	1992-07-02	Eldorado Hotel & Casino, Reno, Nevada, U.S.	
28	Win	27–1	Maximino Rosario Llano	PTS	10 (10)	1992-06-05	Durango, Mexico	
27	Win	26–1	Juan Carlos Martinez	KO	3 (?)	1992-05-01	Durango, Mexico	
26	Win	25–1	Jesus Rojas	KO	10 (?)	1992-01-31	Durango, Mexico	
25	Win	24–1	Gerardo Sanchez	TKO	2 (?)	1992-01-01	Durango, Mexico	
24	Win	23–1	Roberto Ponce	KO	5 (?)	1991-10-25	Durango, Mexico	
23	Win	22–1	Jesus Morgan Hernandez	TKO	5 (?)	1991-09-20	Durango, Mexico	
22	Win	21–1	Antonio Martinez	TKO	6 (?)	1991-07-16	Durango, Mexico	
21	Win	20–1	Fermin De Leon	KO	4 (?)	1991-06-15	Durango, Mexico	
20	Win	19–1	Tony Soto	TKO	5 (?)	1991-04-30	Durango, Mexico	
19	Win	18–1	Jorge Sandoval	TKO	4 (?)	1991-03-18	Durango, Mexico	
18	Win	17–1	Jaime Olvera	TKO	3 (?)	1991-02-15	Durango, Mexico	
17	Win	16–1	German Vazquez	TKO	1 (?)	1990-11-30	Monterrey, Mexico	
16	Win	15–1	Arturo Del Toro	PTS	6 (6)	1990-11-23	Ciudad Lerdo, Mexico	
15	Win	14–1	Martin Moreno	KO	2 (?)	1990-11-09	Los Mochis, Mexico	
14	Win	13–1	Jorge Samano	PTS	10 (10)	1990-09-21	Monterrey, Mexico	
13	Win	12–1	Jose Luis Baltazar	KO	4 (?)	1990-08-03	Monterrey, Mexico	
12	Win	11–1	Mario Escamilla	TKO	3 (?)	1990-06-06	Durango, Mexico	
11	Win	10–1	Albino Rosas	TKO	4 (?)	1990-05-01	Durango, Mexico	
10	Win	9–1	Hugo Torres	PTS	6 (6)	1989-12-22	Durango, Mexico	
9	Win	8–1	Juan Flores	TKO	3 (?)	1989-11-03	Durango, Mexico	
8	Win	7–1	Arturo Del Toro	PTS	4 (4)	1989-09-01	Durango, Mexico	
7	Win	6–1	Ismael Cole	TKO	2 (?)	1989-08-04	Durango, Mexico	
6	Win	5–1	Juan Molina	TKO	4 (?)	1989-07-14	Durango, Mexico	
5	Win	4–1	Antonio Rodriguez	TKO	3 (?)	1989-06-16	Monterrey, Mexico	
4	Win	3–1	Jorge Ruiz	PTS	4 (4)	1989-06-02	Durango, Mexico	
3	Loss	2–1	Arturo Del Toro	PTS	4 (4)	1989-05-05	Durango, Mexico	
2	Win	2–0	Juanito Flores	TKO	4 (?)	1989-02-15	Durango, Mexico	
1	Win	1–0	Raul Contreras	PTS	4 (4)	1989-01-01	Durango, Mexico	

== See also ==
- List of Mexican boxing world champions
- List of world welterweight boxing champions

Sporting positions
Regional boxing titles
Preceded by Rene Francisco Herrera	Mexican welterweight champion March 25, 1994 – April 13, 1996; Won world title	Vacant Title next held by Marco Antonio Lizarraga
World boxing titles
Preceded by Eamonn Loughran	WBO welterweight champion April 13, 1996 – 1996; Vacated	Vacant Title next held by Mihai Leu
