= Genaro León =

Mexican boxer

Personal information
- Born: Genaro León Quintero; 10 August 1960 (age 65) Culiacán, Sinaloa, Mexico
- Height: 5 ft 9 in (175 cm)
- Weight: Welterweight

Boxing career
- Stance: Orthodox

Boxing record
- Total fights: 61
- Wins: 48
- Win by KO: 43
- Losses: 11
- Draws: 2
Medal record
Men's Amateur boxing
Representing Mexico
Pan American Games
Bronze medal – third place	1983 Caracas	Light welterweight
Central American and Caribbean Games
Silver medal – second place	1982 Havana	Welterweight

Genaro León (born 10 August 1960) is a Mexican former professional boxer who competed from 1984 to 2001. He held the WBO welterweight title in 1989. As an amateur, he competed at the 1984 Summer Olympics.

== Amateur career ==
León represented Mexico at the 1984 Los Angeles Olympic Games, as a welterweight. His results were:

- Defeated Daniel Domínguez (Argentina) 5-0
- Defeated Akinobu Hiranaka (Japan) 5-0
- Defeated Khemais Refai (Tunisia) 3-2
- Lost to Mark Breland (United States) KO by 1

== Professional career ==
León turned pro in 1984 and in 1989 captured the inaugural and vacant WBO welterweight title with a KO win over Danny Garcia. He vacated the title without defending it. In 1993 he challenged WBC welterweight title holder James McGirt, but lost a decision.

== Professional boxing record ==
61 fights	48 wins	11 losses
By knockout	43	8
By decision	4	2
By disqualification	1	1
Draws	2	

No.	Result	Record	Opponent	Type	Round, time	Date	Location	Notes
61	Win	48–11–2	Carlos Antonio Escobar	KO	7 (?)	2001-07-21	Arena México, Mexico City, Mexico	
60	Loss	47–11–2	Gustavo Alonso Soto	TKO	6 (?)	1998-06-19	Mexico	
59	Loss	47–10–2	Saïd Ben Najem	TKO	6 (?)	1998-02-21	Palais Omnisport de Paris-Bercy, Paris, France	
58	Loss	47–9–2	Mario Iribarren	TKO	3 (10)	1996-11-01	Exhibition Center, Coconut Grove, Florida, U.S.	
57	Win	47–8–2	Armando Campas	TKO	6 (10)	1996-04-19	35th Ave Swap Meet, Phoenix, Arizona, U.S.	
56	Loss	46–8–2	James Page	TKO	2 (?)	1995-10-27	Pavilion, Concord, California, U.S.	
55	Loss	46–7–2	Yori Boy Campas	TKO	3 (12)	1995-08-07	Tijuana, Mexico	For NABO welterweight title
54	Win	46–6–2	Arturo Lopez Trujillo	TKO	2 (?)	1995-04-28	Los Mochis, Mexico	
53	Loss	45–6–2	Rene Francisco Herrera	PTS	10 (10)	1994-08-06	Plaza de Toros, Ciudad Juárez, Mexico	
52	Loss	45–5–2	Jesus Cardenas	DQ	3 (12)	1994-04-23	Mexico City, Mexico	For WBC Continental Americas welterweight title
51	Win	45–4–2	Luis Francisco Perez	TKO	9 (10)	1993-11-13	Mexico City, Mexico	
50	Win	44–4–2	Juan Hernandez	TKO	6 (?)	1993-10-09	Mexico City, Mexico	
49	Loss	43–4–2	Miguel González	TKO	8 (?)	1993-05-15	Cancún, Mexico	
48	Loss	43–3–2	Buddy McGirt	UD	12 (12)	1993-01-12	Paramount Theater, New York City, New York, U.S.	For WBC welterweight title
47	Win	43–2–2	Edison Benitez	TKO	1 (?)	1992-08-24	Frontón México, Mexico City, Mexico	
46	Win	42–2–2	Jerry Grant	TKO	1 (?)	1992-05-22	Toreo de Cuatro Caminos, Mexico City, Mexico	
45	Win	41–2–2	Ramon Ramos	TKO	2 (12)	1992-03-16	Frontón México, Mexico City, Mexico	Retained WBC Continental Americas welterweight title
44	Win	40–2–2	Charles Duffy	TKO	7 (10)	1992-01-30	Paris, France	
43	Win	39–2–2	Saoul Mamby	PTS	8 (8)	1991-10-20	Paris, France	
42	Win	38–2–2	Newton Barnett	KO	2 (8)	1991-07-13	Forges-les-Eaux, France	
41	Win	37–2–2	Delfino Marin	TKO	2 (?)	1991-06-19	Paris, France	
40	Win	36–2–2	Miguel Angel Dominguez	TKO	4 (12)	1991-03-27	Mexico City, Mexico	Retained WBC Continental Americas welterweight title
39	Draw	35–2–2	Judas Clottey	PTS	8 (8)	1990-12-15	Salle des Étoiles, Monte Carlo, Monaco	
38	Win	35–2–1	David Silva	TKO	3 (?)	1990-11-22	Palacio de los Deportes, Madrid, Spain	
37	Win	34–2–1	Ruben Villaman	TKO	5 (?)	1990-04-05	Mazatlán, Mexico	
36	Win	33–2–1	Sulio Sanchez	TKO	1 (12)	1989-12-16	Palacio de los Deportes, Mexico City, Mexico	Won vacant WBC Continental Americas welterweight title
35	Draw	32–2–1	Miguel Angel Dominguez	TD	7 (10)	1989-11-24	Hermosillo, Mexico	
34	Win	32–2	Alberto Alcaraz	TKO	4 (?)	1989-09-29	Hermosillo, Mexico	
33	Win	31–2	Danny Garcia	KO	1 (12)	1989-05-06	Santa Ana Stadium, Santa Ana, California, U.S.	Won inaugural WBO welterweight title
32	Win	30–2	Agustin Caballero	KO	4 (?)	1989-03-09	Sports Arena, Los Angeles, California, U.S.	
31	Win	29–2	Young Dick Tiger	MD	10 (10)	1988-09-22	Sports Arena, Los Angeles, California, U.S.	
30	Win	28–2	Charlie Brown	KO	2 (10)	1988-07-23	Tijuana, Mexico	
29	Win	27–2	Ramon Cardenas	TKO	2 (?)	1988-06-04	Mazatlán, Mexico	
28	Loss	26–2	David Taylor	TKO	1 (?)	1988-02-06	Stade Pierre de Coubertin, Paris, France	
27	Win	26–1	Joel Brival	KO	4 (6)	1987-11-06	Salle Sallusse Santoni, Antibes, France	
26	Win	25–1	Frankie Lake	KO	1 (8)	1987-10-10	Le Zénith, Paris, France	
25	Win	24–1	Ruben Villaman	KO	1 (?)	1987-07-17	Hermosillo, Mexico	
24	Win	23–1	Ariel Conde	KO	1 (6)	1987-05-29	La Paz, Mexico	
23	Win	22–1	Jaime Castorena	KO	4 (?)	1987-04-14	Tijuana, Mexico	
22	Win	21–1	Ricardo Munoz	KO	5 (?)	1987-03-09	Tijuana, Mexico	
21	Win	20–1	Jorge Hernandez	TKO	2 (?)	1987-02-02	Tijuana, Mexico	
20	Win	19–1	Raffaele Paoletti	TKO	3 (?)	1986-11-07	Bordeaux, France	
19	Win	18–1	Carlos Cesar Prieto	DQ	7 (?)	1986-10-25	Le Zénith, Paris, France	
18	Win	17–1	Patrick Boon	PTS	6 (6)	1986-10-03	La Rochelle, France	
17	Win	16–1	Sergio Aguirre	TKO	4 (?)	1986-08-29	Arena Naucalpan, Naucalpan, Mexico	
16	Win	15–1	Jaime Montano	KO	1 (?)	1986-05-15	Ciudad Obregón, Mexico	
15	Win	14–1	Sergio Aguirre	TKO	1 (?)	1986-05-03	Mexico City, Mexico	
14	Win	13–1	José Luis Bueno	TKO	1 (?)	1986-03-21	Hermosillo, Mexico	
13	Win	12–1	Mario Olmedo	PTS	10 (10)	1986-02-22	Mexico City, Mexico	
12	Loss	11–1	Ruben Villaman	TKO	5 (?)	1985-12-07	Mazatlán, Mexico	
11	Win	11–0	Joel Soto	KO	1 (?)	1985-11-22	Guamúchil, Mexico	
10	Win	10–0	Rey Morales	KO	7 (?)	1985-09-13	Ciudad Juárez, Mexico	
9	Win	9–0	Jose Luis Alejo	KO	2 (?)	1985-07-29	Arena Tijuana 72, Tijuana, Mexico	
8	Win	8–0	Lalo Galindo	KO	1 (?)	1985-05-17	San Luis Potosí, Mexico	
7	Win	7–0	Aaron Brown	KO	1 (8)	1985-05-09	Olympic Auditorium, Los Angeles, California, U.S.	
6	Win	6–0	Daniel Contreras	KO	2 (?)	1985-03-28	La Paz, Mexico	
5	Win	5–0	Jose Lopez	KO	2 (?)	1985-03-18	Tijuana, Mexico	
4	Win	4–0	Gilberto Canchola	KO	7 (?)	1984-12-21	Culiacán, Mexico	
3	Win	3–0	Fidencio Cebreros	KO	2 (?)	1984-11-23	Mazatlán, Mexico	
2	Win	2–0	Jose Luis Millan	TKO	9 (?)	1984-11-09	Culiacán, Mexico	
1	Win	1–0	Ramon Cardoso	KO	2 (?)	1984-09-28	Culiacán, Mexico	

== See also ==
- List of Mexican boxing world champions
- List of world welterweight boxing champions

Sporting positions
Regional boxing titles
Vacant Title last held by Aaron Davis	WBC Continental Americas welterweight champion December 16, 1989 – 1993; Vacated	Vacant Title next held by Jesus Cardenas
World boxing titles
Inaugural champion	WBO welterweight champion May 6, 1989 – 1989; Vacated	Vacant Title next held by Manning Galloway
