= Jorge Vaca =

Mexican boxer (born 1959)

Personal information
- Born: 14 December 1959 (age 66) Guadalajara, Jalisco, Mexico
- Height: 5 ft 10 1/2 in (179 cm)
- Weight: Welterweight; Light middleweight

Boxing career
- Reach: 73 in (185 cm)
- Stance: Orthodox

Boxing record
- Total fights: 93
- Wins: 65
- Win by KO: 50
- Losses: 26
- Draws: 2

Jorge Vaca (born 14 December 1959) is a Mexican former professional boxer who held the World Welterweight Championship.

== Professional career ==
Vaca turned pro in 1978 and captured the WBC and Lineal welterweight title by beating Lloyd Honeyghan via 8th round technical decision in 1987, but lost the belt to Honeyghan via 3rd KO in a rematch in 1988. Later that year he took on IBF Welterweight Title holder Simon Brown, but lost the bout via 3rd TKO. Vaca did get one more big victory in a TKO 6 win over Mark Breland in 1991. Although he never got a shot again at another major title, Vaca was destroyed by a relatively young Roy Jones Jr. in one round, in the Light-Middleweight weight-class in 1992. He continued to fight until 2002, mostly in his native Mexico, and retired after a loss to Marco Antonio Rubio. Vaca finished with a record of 66 wins, 24 losses, 2 draws, with 51 knockouts.

== Professional boxing record ==
93 fights	65 wins	26 losses
By knockout	50	21
By decision	15	5
Draws	2	

No.	Result	Record	Opponent	Type	Round	Date	Location	Notes
93	Loss	65–26–2	(Mexico) Jose Luis Cruz	KO	2	30 November 2002	Mexico	
92	Loss	65–25–2	(Mexico) Marco Antonio Rubio	TKO	4	17 May 2002	Auditorio Benito Juarez, Los Mochis, Sinaloa, Mexico	
91	Loss	65–24–2	(Mexico) Jose Luis Cruz	PTS	12	1 June 2001	Guadalajara, Jalisco, Mexico	Mexico Welterweight Title.
90	Win	65–23–2	(Mexico) Jose Luis Benitez	PTS	12	16 March 2001	Guadalajara, Jalisco, Mexico	Mexico Welterweight Title.
89	Loss	64–23–2	(United States) Cory Spinks	TKO	7	17 September 2000	(United States) Harrah's, Saint Louis, Missouri, U.S.	WBO NABO Welterweight Title.
88	Win	64–22–2	(Mexico) Jose Luis Benitez	PTS	12	16 June 2000	Guadalajara, Jalisco, Mexico	WBC Continental Americas Welterweight Title.
87	Win	63–22–2	(Mexico) Juan Carlos Barreto	PTS	12	11 February 2000	Guadalajara, Jalisco, Mexico	WBC Mundo Hispano Light Middleweight Title.
86	Draw	62–22–2	(Puerto Rico) Héctor Camacho	TD	3	27 November 1999	Carolina, Puerto Rico, Puerto Rico	
85	Win	62–22–1	(Mexico) Brigido Alvarez	TKO	7	3 September 1999	Arena Coliseo, Guadalajara, Jalisco, Mexico	
84	Loss	61–22–1	(Kenya) Evans Ashira	PTS	10	5 March 1999	Sondermarkshallen, Give, Denmark	
83	Win	61–21–1	(Mexico) Juan Carlos Sanchez	PTS	12	16 December 1998	Arena Coliseo, Guadalajara,, Mexico	WBC Continental Americas Welterweight Title.
82	Win	60–21–1	(Mexico) Juan Carlos Sanchez	DQ	4	13 November 1998	Guadalajara, Jalisco, Mexico	WBC Continental Americas Welterweight Title.
81	Win	59–21–1	(Mexico) Jose Gerardo Esquivel	PTS	12	25 September 1998	Guadalajara, Jalisco, Mexico	WBC Mundo Hispano Light Middleweight Title.
80	Win	58–21–1	(Mexico) Nicolas Lucio	KO	3	28 August 1998	Arena Coliseo, Guadalajara, Jalisco, Mexico	
79	Win	57–21–1	(Mexico) Raul Sanchez	KO	7	1 August 1998	Guadalajara, Jalisco, Mexico	
78	Loss	56–21–1	(Mexico) Eduardo Gutierrez	TKO	6	27 June 1998	Mexico City, Mexico	WBC Continental Americas Middleweight Title.
77	Loss	56–20–1	(United States) David Reid	KO	1	3 October 1997	(United States) The Tropicana, Atlantic City, New Jersey, U.S.	Vaca knocked out at 0:46 of the first round.
76	Loss	56–19–1	(United States) Anthony Jones	KO	7	11 July 1997	(United States) Rosemont Horizon, Rosemont, Illinois, U.S.	Vaca knocked out at 0:47 of the seventh round.
75	Loss	56–18–1	(Mexico) José Luis López	TKO	6	25 March 1997	(United States) Oxnard Civic Auditorium, Oxnard, California, U.S.	
74	Loss	56–17–1	(Mexico) Quirino Garcia	KO	10	30 November 1996	Ciudad Juarez, Chihuahua, Mexico	Mexico Light Middleweight Title.
73	Win	56–16–1	(Mexico) Joel Baltazar	KO	2	23 August 1996	Guadalajara, Mexico	
72	Win	55–16–1	(Mexico) Arturo Lopez Trujillo	KO	6	21 June 1996	Guadalajara, Jalisco, Mexico	
71	Loss	54–16–1	(Mexico) Quirino Garcia	KO	3	22 December 1995	Ciudad Juarez, Chihuahua, Mexico	Mexico Light Middleweight Title.
70	Win	54–15–1	(Mexico) Jesus Osuna	KO	3	28 October 1995	Mexico City, Mexico	Mexico Light Middleweight Title.
69	Loss	53–15–1	(Australia) Troy Waters	PTS	10	26 June 1995	Parramatta Stadium, Sydney, New South Wales, Australia	
68	Win	53–14–1	(Mexico) Jaime Llanes	KO	9	28 April 1995	Los Mochis, Sinaloa, Mexico	Mexico Light Middleweight Title.
67	Win	52–14–1	(Mexico) Mario Maciel	KO	1	4 February 1995	Mexico City, Mexico	
66	Loss	51–14–1	(United States) Raúl Márquez	PTS	10	5 November 1994	(United States) MGM Grand Garden Arena, Las Vegas, Nevada, U.S.	
65	Win	51–13–1	(Mexico) Miguel Angel Suarez	KO	1	25 June 1994	Mexico City, Mexico	
64	Loss	50–13–1	(Mexico) Yori Boy Campas	TKO	2	16 February 1994	Tijuana, Baja California, Mexico	
63	Loss	50–12–1	(Mexico) Jaime Llanes	KO	2	26 February 1993	Culiacan, Sinaloa, Mexico	Mexico Light Middleweight Title.
62	Loss	50–11–1	(Mexico) Jaime Llanes	KO	3	18 December 1992	Culiacan, Sinaloa, Mexico	Mexico Light Middleweight Title.
61	Win	50–10–1	(Mexico) Mario Maciel	TKO	4	30 October 1992	Guadalajara, Jalisco, Mexico	Mexico Light Middleweight Title.
60	Win	49–10–1	(Mexico) Martin Quiroz	PTS	12	28 September 1992	Mexico City, Mexico	Mexico Light Middleweight Title.
59	Loss	48–10–1	(United States) Roy Jones Jr.	KO	1	10 Jan 1992	(United States) Paramount Theatre, New York City, U.S.	Vaca knocked out at 1:45 of the first round.
58	Win	48–9–1	(United States) Mark Breland	TKO	6	13 September 1991	(United States) ARCO Arena, Sacramento, California, U.S.	Referee stopped the bout at 1:37 of the sixth round.
57	Win	47–9–1	(United States) Quincy Taylor	UD	10	6 May 1991	(United States) Great Western Forum, Inglewood, California, U.S.	
56	Win	46–9–1	(United States) Quincy Taylor	TD	6	8 October 1990	(United States) Great Western Forum, Inglewood, California, U.S.	Referee stopped the bout at 1:53 of the sixth round. 50-45, 49-46, 48-47.
55	Win	45–9–1	(Mexico) Ruben Villaman	KO	1	27 August 1990	Tijuana, Baja California, Mexico	
54	Win	44–9–1	(Cuba) Ali Sanchez	KO	2	14 July 1990	Zapopan, Jalisco, Mexico	
53	Win	43–9–1	(Mexico) Luciano Fernandez	TKO	6	12 May 1990	Zapopan, Jalisco, Mexico	
52	Loss	42–9–1	(United States) Terry Norris	SD	10	9 October 1989	Plaza de Toros El Toreo, Tijuana, Baja California, Mexico	
51	Loss	42–8–1	(Jamaica) Simon Brown	TKO	3	16 July 1988	National Arena, Kingston, Jamaica	For IBF welterweight title
50	Loss	42–7–1	(United Kingdom) Lloyd Honeyghan	KO	3	29 March 1988	(United Kingdom) Wembley Arena, London, U.K.	Lost WBC, The Ring, and lineal welterweight titles
49	Win	42–6–1	(United Kingdom) Lloyd Honeyghan	TD	8	28 October 1987	(United Kingdom) Grand Hall, London, U.K.	Won WBC, The Ring, and lineal welterweight titles
48	Win	41–6–1	(United States) Saoul Mamby	UD	10	21 August 1987	Caliente Hipódromo, Tijuana, Baja California, Mexico	
47	Win	40–6–1	(Mexico) Juan Alonso Villa	KO	2	26 June 1987	Guadalajara, Jalisco, Mexico	Mexico Welterweight Title.
46	Win	39–6–1	(Mexico) Ruben Villaman	KO	5	25 April 1987	Palacio de los Deportes, Mexico City, Mexico	Mexico Welterweight Title.
45	Win	38–6–1	(United States) David Franklin	KO	2	27 March 1987	Guadalajara, Jalisco, Mexico	
44	Win	37–6–1	(Mexico) Miguel Angel Dominguez	TKO	6	21 February 1987	Guadalajara, Jalisco, Mexico	Mexico Welterweight Title.
43	Win	36–6–1	(Mexico) Pipino Cuevas	KO	2	19 December 1986	Guadalajara, Jalisco, Mexico	
42	Win	35–6–1	(Mexico) Roman Nunez	KO	4	1 December 1986	Tijuana, Baja California, Mexico	Mexico Welterweight Title.
41	Win	34–6–1	(Mexico) Ruben Villaman	KO	6	8 September 1986	Tijuana, Baja California, Mexico	Mexico Welterweight Title.
40	Win	33–6–1	(Mexico) Sergio Medina	KO	10	20 June 1986	Guadalajara, Jalisco, Mexico	Mexico Welterweight Title.
39	Win	32–6–1	(Mexico) Juan Escobar	KO	3	24 March 1986	Tijuana, Baja California, Mexico	
38	Win	31–6–1	(Mexico) Sergio Medina	PTS	12	10 January 1986	Guadalajara, Jalisco, Mexico	Mexico Welterweight Title.
37	Win	30–6–1	(Mexico) Gerardo Derbez	KO	6	29 November 1985	Arena Coliseo, Guadalajara, Jalisco, Mexico	Mexico Welterweight Title.Derbez died of injuries sustained in this bout
36	Win	29–6–1	(United States) Tommy Richardson	UD	10	15 August 1985	(United States) Grand Olympic Auditorium, Los Angeles, California, U.S.	
35	Win	28–6–1	(United States) Herman Montes	TKO	3	2 May 1985	(United States) Sports Arena, Los Angeles, California. U.S.	
34	Win	27–6–1	(Mexico) Gerardo Derbez	KO	10	22 March 1985	Ciudad Juarez, Chihuahua, Mexico	Mexico Welterweight Title.
33	Win	26–6–1	(Mexico) Rey Morales	KO	1	11 January 1985	Ciudad Juarez, Chihuahua, Mexico	Mexico Welterweight Title.
32	Win	25–6–1	(Mexico) Alberto Lopez	KO	9	26 October 1984	Guadalajara, Jalisco, Mexico	Mexico Welterweight Title.
31	Loss	24–6–1	(United States) Herman Montes	KO	2	11 September 1984	Tijuana, Baja California, Mexico	
30	Win	24–5–1	(United States) Al Long	SD	10	12 July 1984	(United States) Grand Olympic Auditorium, Los Angeles, California, U.S.	
29	Win	23–5–1	(Mexico) Gerardo Derbez	KO	2	29 May 1984	Tijuana, Baja California, Mexico	Mexico Welterweight Title.
28	Win	22–5–1	(Mexico) Gilberto Canchola	KO	2	27 March 1984	Auditorio Municipal, Tijuana, Mexico	Mexico Welterweight Title.
27	Draw	21–5–1	(United States) Alvaro Granillo	PTS	10	13 January 1984	Mexicali, Baja California, Mexico	
26	Win	21–5	(Mexico) Eduardo Dominguez	KO	7	1 September 1983	(United States) Grand Olympic Auditorium, Los Angeles, California, U.S.	
25	Loss	20–5	(Cuba) Tomas Perez	KO	8	9 June 1983	(United States) Sports Arena, Los Angeles, California, U.S.	Vaca knocked out at 0:39 of the eighth round.
24	Win	20–4	(Mexico) Agustin Toral	KO	2	25 April 1983	Guadalajara, Jalisco, Mexico	
23	Win	19–4	(Mexico) Sergio Sanchez	KO	3	26 February 1983	Mexico City, Mexico	
22	Win	18–4	(Mexico) Francisco Paco Balderas	KO	1	26 November 1982	Guadalajara, Jalisco, Mexico	
21	Win	17–4	(Mexico) Jose Luis Soberanes	KO	2	3 September 1982	Guadalajara, Jalisco, Mexico	
20	Win	16–4	(Mexico) Jose Ruelas	KO	4	17 July 1982	Guadalajara, Jalisco, Mexico	
19	Win	15–4	(Mexico) Jose Alvarez	KO	5	28 May 1982	Guadalajara, Jalisco, Mexico	
18	Win	14–4	(Mexico) Jose Luis Soberanes	KO	4	4 December 1981	Arena Coliseo, Guadalajara, Jalisco, Mexico	
17	Win	13–4	(Mexico) Ramon Beltran	TKO	1	6 November 1981	Arena Coliseo, Guadalajara, Jalisco, Mexico	
16	Win	12–4	(Mexico) Juan Ochoa	TKO	1	9 October 1981	Arena Coliseo, Guadalajara, Jalisco, Mexico	
15	Win	11–4	(Mexico) Leonardo Bermudez	KO	4	28 August 1981	Arena Coliseo, Guadalajara, Jalisco, Mexico	
14	Loss	10–4	(Mexico) Juan Elizondo	KO	7	27 February 1981	Arena Coliseo, Guadalajara, Jalisco, Mexico	
13	Win	10–3	(Mexico) Nicolas Herrera	TKO	3	16 January 1981	Arena Coliseo, Guadalajara, Jalisco, Mexico	
12	Win	9–3	(Mexico) Ranulfo Cardona	TKO	3	14 November 1980	Arena Coliseo, Guadalajara, Jalisco, Mexico	Jalisco Welterweight Title.
11	Loss	8–3	(Mexico) Juan Elizondo	KO	2	10 October 1980	Arena Coliseo, Guadalajara, Jalisco, Mexico	
10	Win	8–2	(Mexico) Jesse Blanco	TKO	4	22 August 1980	Arena Coliseo, Guadalajara, Jalisco, Mexico	Jalisco Welterweight Title.
9	Loss	7–2	(Mexico) Rodolfo Valero	KO	5	16 November 1979	Arena Coliseo, Guadalajara, Jalisco, Mexico	
8	Win	7–1	(Mexico) Alberto Lopez	PTS	10	16 March 1979	Arena Coliseo, Guadalajara, Jalisco, Mexico	
7	Win	6–1	(Mexico) Gerardo Galindo	TKO	5	6 October 1978	Arena Coliseo, Guadalajara, Jalisco, Mexico	
6	Win	5–1	(Mexico) Nemesio Ontiveros	TKO	4	1 September 1978	Arena Coliseo, Guadalajara, Jalisco, Mexico	
5	Loss	4–1	(Mexico) Rodolfo Valero	KO	3	16 June 1978	Monterrey, Nuevo Leon, Mexico	
4	Win	4–0	(Mexico) Antonio Castillo	KO	2	19 May 1978	Arena Coliseo, Guadalajara, Jalisco, Mexico	
3	Win	3–0	(Mexico) Juan Ramirez	TKO	3	28 April 1978	Arena Coliseo, Guadalajara, Jalisco, Mexico	
2	Win	2–0	(Mexico) Alfonso Rodriguez	KO	2	17 March 1978	Arena Coliseo, Guadalajara, Jalisco, Mexico	
1	Win	1–0	(Mexico) Jose Luis Piceno	KO	2	10 February 1978	Arena Coliseo, Guadalajara, Jalisco, Mexico	

== See also ==
- List of Mexican boxing world champions
- List of world welterweight boxing champions

Sporting positions
World boxing titles
Preceded by Lloyd Honeyghan	WBC welterweight champion 28 October 1987 - 29 March 1988	Succeeded by Lloyd Honeyghan
Preceded by Lloyd Honeyghan	The Ring welterweight champion 28 October 1987 - 29 March 1988	Succeeded by Lloyd Honeyghan
