= Mihai Leu =

Romanian boxer (1968–2025)

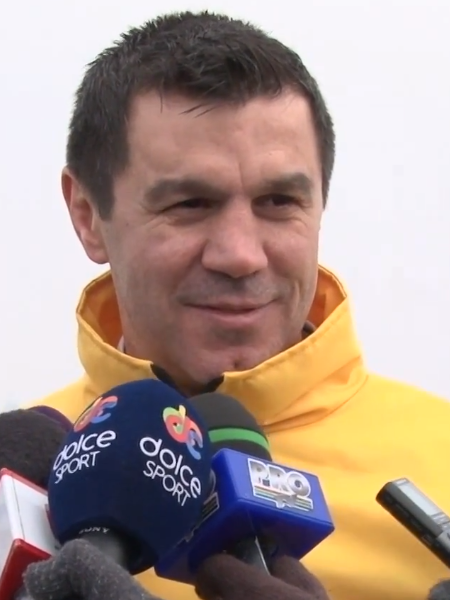
- Leu in 2014

Personal information
- Nicknames: Michael Löwe; Lion
- Nationality: Romanian
- Born: 13 February 1968 Hunedoara, Romania
- Died: 1 July 2025 (aged 57) Bucharest, Romania
- Height: 5 ft 7 1/2 in (171 cm)
- Weight: Welterweight

Boxing career
- Reach: 64 in (163 cm)
- Stance: Orthodox

Boxing record
- Total fights: 28
- Wins: 28
- Win by KO: 10
- Losses: 0
Medal record
Men's Amateur boxing
Representing Romania
World Junior Championships
Gold medal – first place	1987 Havana	Light welterweight

Mihai Leu (13 February 1968 – 1 July 2025), also known as Michael Löwe, was a Romanian professional boxer who competed between 1991 and 1997. He held the WBO welterweight title in 1997.

Leu retired after one title defense, against Michael Carruth, becoming the third European boxer to retire as an undefeated world champion, after Jack McAuliffe and Terry Marsh. Due to an injury, he was forced to abandon boxing but unwilling to give up the world of sports, he turned to be a rally driver. He later became a national rally champion.

== Amateur career ==
Leu started boxing in 1977 at local club Constructorul Hunedoara. In 1981, he transferred to Metalul Hunedoara, and in 1982 he moved on to Dinamo Bucharest. During his time with Dinamo, he won the national championship four years in a row (1983–1986). In 1986, he joined Steaua Bucharest and also became a member of the national team. In 1987, he became World Junior Champion in Havana, Cuba.

In 1987, after becoming World Junior Champion, Leu fled communist-ruled Romania, risking severe consequences, and moved to West Germany. There, he competed for Bayer Leverkusen, with whom he became German champion twice, in 1989 and 1990.

In total, Leu fought 200 amateur matches, out of which he won 190.

== Professional career ==
In 1991, Leu became a professional boxer in Germany (using the name Michael Löwe). He would go on to win the vacant WBO welterweight title in 1997 by defeating Santiago Samaniego. He would defend the title once against Irish challenger Michael Carruth, before officially retiring in 1998.

== Rally career ==
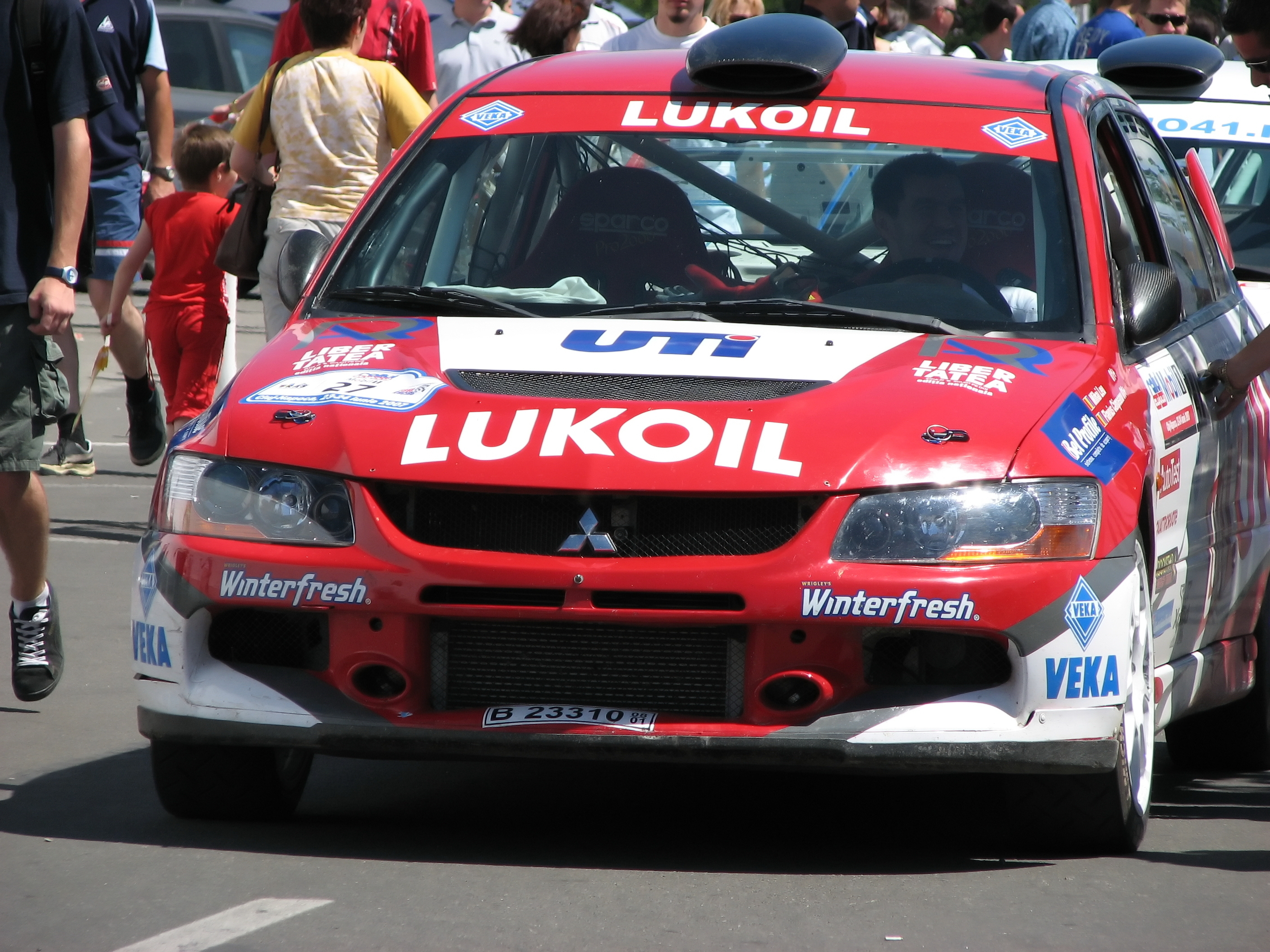
Leu at the 2007 Romanian Rally Championship

Leu made his debut in 1994 at the Banat Rally, driving a Volkswagen Golf GTI. In 1998, he started his new career at the wheel of a Ford Ka and after only three years, he managed to become Romania's rally vice-champion.

Five years later, in 2003, Leu became Romania's national champion, driving a Hyundai Accent WRC with co-driver Ciprian Solomon. After failing to win another race following his championship-winning year, Leu retired from competitive rallying in 2008, only to return in 2010 as team manager of the Jack Daniel's Rally Team, in the Romanian National Rally Championship (CNR).

== Personal life, illness and death ==
Leu was the son of Nicolae Leu, a well-known Romanian rally driver of the 1970s and 1980s. His brother, Victor, also made his debut in car racing in 1999, as his co-driver.

Leu was married to Anna, an Italian woman he met in Germany, and the couple had one son named Marco.

Leu was involved in politics along with the Partidul Conservator, despite failing to secure a place in the European Parliament, in the 2007 national elections. He worked part-time as assistant at the Tibiscus University in Timișoara.

In 2014, Leu had colon cancer and received surgery in Bucharest and treatment in Vienna.

Leu died aged 57, in Bucharest on 1 July 2025, following a long illness.

== Professional boxing record ==
28 fights	28 wins	0 losses
By knockout	10	0
By decision	18	0

No.	Result	Record	Opponent	Type	Round, time	Date	Location	Notes
28	Win	28–0	Michael Carruth	MD	12	20 September 1997	Tivoli Eissporthalle, Aachen, Germany	Retained WBO welterweight title
27	Win	27–0	Santiago Samaniego	UD	12	22 February 1997	Alsterdorfer Sporthalle Hamburg, Germany	Won vacant WBO welterweight title
26	Win	26–0	Eric Jakubowski	TKO	5 (10)	16 November 1996	Sporthalle, Hamburg, Germany	
25	Win	25–0	Jorge Ramirez	PTS	8	19 October 1996	Zoo-Gesellschaftshaus, Frankfurt, Germany	
24	Win	24–0	Dwayne Swift	KO	4 (10)	8 June 1996	Deutz Sporthalle, Cologne, Germany	
23	Win	23–0	Freddy Demeulenaere	PTS	8	4 May 1996	Sport und Erholungszentrum, Berlin, Germany	
22	Win	22–0	Jose Brand	PTS	8	14 April 1996	Sporthalle, Hamburg, Germany	
21	Win	21–0	Miguel Ángel Peña	PTS	8	10 June 1995	Europahalle, Karlsruhe, Germany	
20	Win	20–0	Craig Houk	TKO	11 (12), 2:24	1 April 1995	Saaltheater Geulen, Aachen, Germany	Won vacant WBO Inter-Continental welterweight title
19	Win	19–0	Bobby Butters	UD	8	28 January 1995	Sporthalle, Berlin, Germany	
18	Win	18–0	Harold Bennett	PTS	8	17 December 1994	Sporthalle, Hamburg, Germany	
17	Win	17–0	Stefan Schramm	PTS	10	3 December 1994	Atelier Bruno Bruni, Hamburg, Germany	Won vacant German International welterweight title
16	Win	16–0	Benjamin Felix	TKO	2 (?)	13 November 1994	Universum Gym, Hamburg, Germany	
15	Win	15–0	Lloyd Ratalsky	TKO	4 (?)	22 October 1994	Hansehalle, Lübeck, Germany	
14	Win	14–0	Attila Veres	PTS	8	3 September 1994	Domplatz, Wiener Neustadt, Austria	
13	Win	13–0	Gejza Stipak	TKO	4 (?)	10 April 1994	Universum Gym, Hamburg, Germany	
12	Win	12–0	Pave Turic	KO	2 (?)	19 March 1994	Lugner City, Vienna, Austria	
11	Win	11–0	Antonio Daga	PTS	8	19 February 1994	Sportshalle, Hamburg, Germany	
10	Win	10–0	Hector Omar Luque	PTS	6	5 February 1994	Deutschlandhalle, Berlin, Germany	
9	Win	9–0	Nestor Jesus Gil	PTS	8	15 October 1993	Sporthalle, Berlin, Germany	
8	Win	8–0	Marino Monteyne	PTS	6	2 October 1993	Barbarossa Halle, Kaiserslautern, Germany	
7	Win	7–0	Farid Bennecer	TKO	4 (?)	11 September 1993	Tivoli Eissporthalle, Aachen, Germany	
6	Win	6–0	Miroslav Strbak	KO	4 (?)	26 June 1993	Sporthalle, Hamburg, Germany	
5	Win	5–0	Oscar Washington	PTS	6	22 May 1993	Tivoli Eissporthalle, Aachen, Germany	
4	Win	4–0	Miroslav Strbak	PTS	6	3 April 1993	Sporthalle, Hamburg, Germany	
3	Win	3–0	Wayne Green	PTS	4	13 February 1993	Sporthalle, Hamburg, Germany	
2	Win	2–0	Jan Mazgut	KO	2 (?)	13 December 1991	Minden, Germany	
1	Win	1–0	Gejza Stipak	PTS	6	16 September 1991	Legien Center, Berlin, Germany	

== See also ==
- List of world welterweight boxing champions
- List of undefeated world boxing champions

Sporting positions
Regional boxing titles
Preceded by Stefan Schramm	German International welterweight champion 3 December 1994 – 2 February 1997; Won world title	Vacant Title next held by Alpaslan Aguzum
New title	WBO Inter-Continental welterweight champion 1 April 1995 – 1996; Vacated	Vacant Title next held by Larry Barnes
World boxing titles
Vacant Title last held by José Luis López	WBO welterweight champion 22 February 1997 – 1998; Retired	Succeeded by Akhmed Kotiev promoted from interim status
