= Eamonn Loughran =

Irish boxer (born 1970)

Personal information
- Born: 5 June 1970 (age 56) Ballymena, Northern Ireland
- Height: 5 ft 9 in (175 cm)
- Weight: Welterweight

Boxing career
- Stance: Orthodox

Boxing record
- Total fights: 30
- Wins: 26
- Win by KO: 13
- Losses: 2
- Draws: 1
- No contests: 1
Medal record
Men's Amateur boxing
Representing Ireland
World Junior Championships
Silver medal – second place	1987 Havana	Light welterweight

Eamonn Loughran (born 5 June 1970) is an Irish former professional boxer who competed from 1987 to 1996. He held the WBO welterweight title from 1993 to 1996, successfully defending the title five times. At regional level he held the Commonwealth welterweight title from 1992 to 1993.

== Amateur career ==
As an amateur, Loughran boxed for Ireland and won a silver medal at the 1987 AIBA Youth World Boxing Championships in Havana, Cuba defeating the Cuban and American fighters on the way to the final. Loughran then turned professional later that year.

== Professional career ==
Loughran fought out of the Breen Gym in Belfast and, in December 1987, fought his first professional fight at the Ulster Hall, Belfast, County Antrim, Northern Ireland, in which he beat Glaswegian Adam Muir on a card that included Dave "Boy" McAuley and Andy Holligan.

It was five years, during which he fought twenty professional fights, before Loughran challenged for his first title belt.

In 1993, he would win the vacant WBO welterweight title against American challenger Lorenzo Smith. He would defend the title five times before losing it to José Luis Lopez in March 1996, after which Loughran announced his retirement.

== Professional boxing record ==
30 fights	26 wins	2 losses
By knockout	13	1
By decision	12	0
By disqualification	1	1
Draws	1	
No contests	1	

No.	Result	Record	Opponent	Type	Round, time	Date	Location	Notes
30	Loss	26–2–1 (1)	José Luis López	TKO	1 (12)	1996-04-13	Everton Park Sports Centre, Liverpool, England	Lost WBO welterweight title
29	Win	26–1–1 (1)	Ángel Beltré	UD	12 (12)	1995-10-07	Ulster Hall, Belfast, Northern Ireland	Retained WBO welterweight title
28	Win	25–1–1 (1)	Tony Gannarelli	TKO	6 (12)	1995-08-26	Ulster Hall, Belfast, Northern Ireland	Retained WBO welterweight title
27	NC	24–1–1 (1)	Ángel Beltré	NC	3 (12)	1995-05-27	King's Hall, Belfast, Northern Ireland	Retained WBO welterweight title
26	Win	24–1–1	Manning Galloway	TD	4 (12)	1994-12-10	G-Mex Centre, Manchester, England	Retained WBO welterweight title
25	Win	23–1–1	Alessandro Duran	UD	12 (12)	1994-01-22	King's Hall, Belfast, Northern Ireland	Retained WBO welterweight title
24	Win	22–1–1	Lorenzo Smith	UD	12 (12)	1993-10-16	King's Hall, Belfast, Northern Ireland	Won vacant WBO welterweight title
23	Win	21–1–1	Michael Benjamin	KO	6 (12)	1993-02-06	Cardiff, Wales	Retained Commonwealth welterweight title
22	Win	20–1–1	Desbourne Seaton	TKO	2 (8)	1992-12-08	Legien Center, Mitte, Germany	
21	Win	19–1–1	Donovan Boucher	TKO	3 (12)	1992-11-24	Dome Leisure Centre, Doncaster, England	Won Commonwealth welterweight title
20	Win	18–1–1	Judas Clottey	PTS	8 (8)	1992-09-29	Green's Club, Hamburg, Germany	
19	Win	17–1–1	Kelvin Mortimer	TKO	1 (8)	1992-05-19	National Ice Rink, Cardiff, Wales	
18	Loss	16–1–1	Tony Ekubia	DQ	5 (10)	1992-03-10	Castle Leisure Centre, Bury, England	
17	Win	16–0–1	Juan Carlos Ortiz	PTS	8 (8)	1991-10-15	Legien Center, Mitte, Germany	
16	Win	15–0–1	Glyn Rhodes	PTS	8 (8)	1991-09-21	White Hart Lane, London, England	
15	Win	14–0–1	Marty Duke	PTS	6 (6)	1991-09-03	National Sports Centre, Cardiff, Wales	
14	Win	13–0–1	Terry Morrill	KO	1 (8)	1991-05-28	National Sports Centre, Cardiff, Wales	
13	Win	12–0–1	Kevin Plant	RTD	1 (6)	1991-04-24	Guild Hall, Preston, England	
12	Win	11–0–1	Stan Cunningham	TKO	2 (8)	1991-03-26	York Hall, London, England	
11	Win	10–0–1	Julian Eavis	PTS	6 (6)	1991-03-05	National Sports Centre, Cardiff, Wales	
10	Win	9–0–1	Nick Meloscia	KO	1 (6)	1991-02-12	National Sports Centre, Cardiff, Wales	
9	Win	8–0–1	Mike Morrison	PTS	6 (6)	1990-12-12	Festival Hall, Basildon, England	
8	Win	7–0–1	Parrish Johnson	TKO	2 (8)	1990-11-24	Torrequebrada Hotel & Casino, Benalmádena, Spain	
7	Win	6–0–1	Ronnie Campbell	TKO	1 (8)	1989-11-29	Ulster Hall, Belfast, Northern Ireland	
6	Win	5–0–1	Mark Pearce	PTS	6 (6)	1989-10-31	Ulster Hall, Belfast, Northern Ireland	
5	Win	4–0–1	Richie Nelson	TKO	3 (6)	1989-09-19	Ulster Hall, Belfast, Northern Ireland	
4	Win	3–0–1	Stan King	PTS	6 (6)	1988-10-19	Ulster Hall, Belfast, Northern Ireland	
3	Draw	2–0–1	Antonio Campbell	UD	4 (4)	1988-06-25	Gimnasio Nuevo Panama, Panama City, Panama	
2	Win	2–0	Tony Britland	TKO	1 (6)	1988-06-08	City Hall, Sheffield, England	
1	Win	1–0	Adam Muir	DQ	4 (6)	1987-12-07	Ulster Hall, Belfast, Northern Ireland	

== Post-retirement ==
Loughran never returned to the ring, or to boxing, after the defeat to Lopez. He now lives in his native Ballymena.

== See also ==
- List of British world boxing champions
- List of world welterweight boxing champions

Sporting positions
Regional boxing titles
Preceded by Donovan Boucher	Commonwealth welterweight champion 24 November 1992 – 1995; Vacated	Vacant Title next held by Andrew Murray
World boxing titles
Vacant Title last held by Gert Bo Jacobsen	WBO welterweight champion 16 October 1993 – 13 April 1996	Succeeded by José Luis López
