= Jesús González (boxer) =

American boxer

Jesus Gonzales
Personal information
- Nickname: El Martillo
- Nationality: American
- Born: Jesus Ernesto GonzalesJr; October 3, 1984 (age 41) Phoenix, Arizona
- Height: 5 ft 11 in (180 cm)
- Weight: Super Middleweight; Middleweight; Light Middleweight

Boxing career
- Reach: 73 in (185 cm)
- Stance: Southpaw

Boxing record
- Total fights: 29
- Wins: 27
- Win by KO: 14
- Losses: 2
- Draws: 0
- No contests: 0

Jesus Ernesto Gonzales Jr (born October 3, 1984) is a Mexican-American former professional boxer. Gonzales was the NABF and IBF North American Super Middleweight Champion. Gonzales was considered by boxing critics to be one of the top amateur medal contenders for the United States in the 2004 Summer Olympics.

== Amateur career ==
In his amateur career, Gonzales defeated several future professional champions, including 2004 Olympic Gold Medalist Andre Ward, WBO Light Middleweight Champion Alfredo Angulo, IBA Intercontinental Light Middleweight champion Sechew Powell, and four-time winner over former WBC Welterweight Champion Andre Berto.

In addition, Gonzales won the National Boxing Championship in the middleweight division in 2002, including the Outstanding Boxer Award.

== Professional career ==
Widely considered to be America's top medal contender for the 2004 Olympic Games, Gonzales stunned fans on June 12, 2003 when he decided to bypass the games and turn pro at the age of 18. Signing to Top Rank under promoter Bob Arum for $30,000, with another $30,000 from manager Cameron Dunkin. Gonzales was touted as the next Oscar De La Hoya. Over the next two years Gonzales fought 17 fights including two of the fastest knockouts in the history of boxing: 16 seconds over Josh Peters and a 17 seconds over Bobby Green while climbing to a 17-0 record.

Against the advice of his trainer/father on September 17, 2005 Gonzales became one of the youngest fighters ever (age 20) to fight for the Vacant IBC Middleweight Title. Gonzales suffered an eighth round knockout by former IBC Middleweight Champion José Luis Zertuche.

After this crucial fight, Top Rank's Peter McKinn climbed into the ring and had a short conversation with Jesus' trainer/father Ernie Gonzales Sr. That conversation ended with Ernie Gonzales Sr. delivering a left hook to the side of McKinn's face.

Jesus was unable to get a fight for nearly a year but had vowed to avenge his loss. He finally got the opportunity August 18, 2005 against Fernando Vela. Six victories later, Jesús found himself fighting for the Interim WBC Continental Americas Light Middleweight title on May 1, 2008. With a 12 round unanimous decision, Jesus became the WBC Continental Americas Light Middleweight Champion at the age of 22 with a record of 24-1.

Several weeks later, Jesus signed his second contract with Star Boxing in New York. With Star holding the rights to Jesus over his head and refusing to pay him, Jesus was forced into a two-year hiatus. For the second time in his career, his climb to the top was shattered over a bad contract and Jesus was forced to resign his WBC Continental Americas Light Middleweight title because of non-defense. Crushed and struggling to support his son, Jesús was forced to take a security job at a local high school to make ends meet.

Gonzales was discovered by Fan Base promotions while they were on a trip to Arizona to train one of their prized Canadian fighters. He was at a local gym tearing up the speed bag and Fan Base immediately noticed his outstanding talent. Fan Base put up the money and legal team to release Gonzales from his Star contract and immediately got him a fight in Canada against top Canadian contender Jason Naugler. After TKO’ing Naugler in the second round, Jesús was granted an opportunity to fight for the IBF N. American Super Middleweight Title in his hometown of Phoenix, Arizona.

In March 2011, Jesus defeated Dhafir Smith in a unanimous decision to become the IBF North American Super Middleweight Champion. He was only 26 years old then and vowed not to stop until he achieved a World Title.

=== NABF Super Middleweight Championship ===
Jesus became the new NABF Super Middleweight Champion, by beating tough veteran Francisco Sierra on July 8, 2011 at US Airways Center in Phoenix, Arizona. This bout was televised on ESPN2. In the fight there were two knockdowns, one by each fighter. Gonzales was named the winner by unanimous decision after 12 rounds.

=== IBF Inter-Continental Super Middleweight Championship ===
In 2012, Adonis Stevenson brutally knocked out González in the first round with his signature straight left hand. The knock out was a candidate for KO of the year by Ring Magazine. Prior to the fight, González famously had exposed Stevenson's criminal past. This would turn out to be González last ever fight.

== Professional record ==
27 Wins (14 knockouts), 2 Losses, 0 Draw
Res.	Record	Opponent	Type	Rd., Time	Date	Venue and Location	Notes
Loss	27-2	(Canada) Adonis Stevenson	KO	1 (12), (1:39)	February 18, 2012	Bell Centre, Canada	For vacant IBF Inter-Continental
Win	27-1	(Mexico) Francisco Sierra	UD	12 (12)	July 8, 2011	US Airways Center, Phoenix, Arizona	Won NABF super middleweight title
Win	26-1	(United States) Dhafir Smith	UD	12 (12)	March 15, 2011	Celebrity Theatre, Phoenix, Arizona	Won IBF North American super middleweight title
Win	25-1	(Canada) Jason Naugler	TKO	2 (8), (3:00)	November 12, 2010	Commonwealth Center, Calgary, Alberta, Canada	
Win	24-1	(United States) Durrell Richardson	UD	12 (12)	May 1, 2008	Arena Theatre, Houston, Texas	Won WBC interim Continental Americas light middleweight title
Win	23-1	(United States) Joshua Smith	TKO	2 (10), (2:16)	December 20, 2007	Convention Center, Pasadena, Texas	
Win	22-1	(United States) Anthony Greeley	KO	1 (10), (2:34)	June 9, 2007	Convention Center, Pasadena, Texas	
Win	21-1	(Venezuela) Marcos Primera	UD	10 (10)	January 20, 2007	Celebrity Theatre, Phoenix, Arizona	
Win	20-1	(United States) Darnell Boone	UD	8 (8)	December 15, 2006	Grand Plaza Hotel, Houston, Texas	
Win	19-1	(Mexico) Ramon Espinoza	TKO	3 (8), (2:32)	September 22, 2006	Convention Center, Pasadena, Texas	
Win	18-1	(Mexico) Fernando Vela	UD	6 (6)	August 18, 2006	Las Vegas Hilton, Las Vegas, Nevada	
Loss	17-1-0	(Mexico) José Luis Zertuche	TKO	8 (2), (2:02)	September 17, 2005	America West Arena, Phoenix, Arizona	For vacant IBC middleweight title
Win	17-0-0	(United States) Dumont Welliver	UD	8 (8)	May 28, 2005	(California) Staples Center, Los Angeles	
Win	16-0-0	(United States) Kendall Gould	TKO	4 (10), (0:10)	May 6, 2005	(Texas) Fort McDowell Casino, Fountain Hills, Arizona	
Win	15-0-0	(United States) Chance Leggett	UD	8 (8)	April 8, 2005	(Texas) Fort McDowell Casino, Fountain Hills, Arizona	
Win	14-0-0	(Dominican Republic) Alberto Mercedes	UD	8 (8)	February 18, 2005	Fort McDowell Casino, Fountain Hills, Arizona	
Win	13-0-0	(United States) Abdias Castillo	TKO	2 (8), (1:36)	January 7, 2005	Veteran's Memorial Coliseum, Phoenix, Arizona	
Win	12-0-0	(United States) Jorge Garcia	TKO	4 (8), (2:05)	December 3, 2004	Entertainment Center, Laredo, Texas	
Win	11-0-0	(United States) Shay Mobley	UD	6 (6)	August 27, 2004	Dodge Theater, Phoenix, Arizona	
Win	10-0-0	(United States) Chris Grays	DQ	4 (6), (1:36)	June 18, 2004	Dodge Theater, Phoenix, Arizona	
Win	9-0-0	(Mexico) Francisco Mendez	UD	6 (6)	May 14, 2004	Dodge Theater, Phoenix, Arizona	
Win	8-0-0	(United States) Chris Grays	UD	6 (6)	March 26, 2004	Dodge Theater, Phoenix, Arizona	
Win	7-0-0	(Nigeria) Vincent Moses	TKO	4 (4), (1:39)	January 31, 2004	Dodge Theater, Phoenix, Arizona	
Win	6-0-0	(United States) Nathan Martin	TKO	4 (4), (2:09)	December 5, 2003	Dodge Theater, Phoenix, Arizona	
Win	5-0-0	(United States) Craig Oxley	TKO	1 (4), (2:51)	October 31, 2003	Park ‘N Swap, Phoenix, Arizona	
Win	4-0-0	(United States) Roy Smith	TKO	1 (4), (2:35)	October 17, 2003	Celebrity Theatre, Phoenix, Arizona	
Win	3-0-0	(United States) Bobby Green	TKO	1 (4), (0:17)	October 10, 2003	Desert Diamond Casino, Tucson, Arizona	
Win	2-0-0	(United States) Joshua Peters	KO	1 (4), (0:26)	October 4, 2003	(California) Staples Center, Los Angeles	
Win	1-0-0	(United States) Rawley Wilson	KO	1 (4), (0:59)	August 25, 2003	Celebrity Theatre, Phoenix, Arizona	
