= List of world welterweight boxing champions =

The welterweight world champions listed from Mysterious Billy Smith to Harry Lewis are claimants who were not widely accepted outside of the USA as world champions, and are thus not traditionally included in the list of world champions in the welterweight division. Starting with Paddy Duffy follows a more widely accepted chronological List of World Welterweight Boxing Champions, as recognized by four of the major sanctioning bodies:

- The World Boxing Association (WBA), founded in 1921 as the National Boxing Association (NBA)
- The World Boxing Council (WBC), founded in 1963
- The International Boxing Federation (IBF), founded in 1983
- The World Boxing Organization (WBO), founded in 1988

== Lists of Champions ==
=== World claimants ===
Date won	Date lost	Name	
14 December 1892	26 July 1894	(Canada) Mysterious Billy Smith	World claim
Continued to claim title after losing to Mike "Twin" Sullivan	1 November 1907	(United States) William "Honey" Mellody	World claim
1 November 1907	23 Jan 1908	(United States) Frank Mantell	World claim
23 Jan 1908	March 1911-vacated	(United States) Harry Lewis	World claim

=== World/Undisputed ===
Date won	Date lost	Name	
30 October 1888	10 July 1890 (died)	(United States) Paddy Duffy	World
17 February 1891	20 December 1897 (vacated)	(United States) Tommy Ryan def. Danny Needham	World
25 August 1898	17 April 1900	(Canada) Mysterious Billy Smith	World
17 April 1900	5 June 1900	(United States) Matty Matthews	World
5 June 1900	13 August 1900	(Canada) Eddie Connolly	World
13 August 1900	16 October 1900	(United States) Rube Ferns	World
16 October 1900	24 May 1901	(United States) Matty Matthews	World
24 May 1901	18 December 1901	(United States) Rube Ferns	World
18 December 1901	16 October 1906	Barbados Joe Walcott	World
16 October 1906	23 April 1907	(United States) William "Honey" Mellody	World
23 April 1907	1908 (vacated)	(United States) Mike "Twin" Sullivan	World
1 April 1912	1 January 1914	(United States) Ray Bronson	World
1 January 1914	24 January 1914	(Denmark) Waldemar Holberg	World
24 January 1914	21 March 1914	(United Kingdom) Tom McCormick	World
21 March 1914	1 June 1915	(United Kingdom) Matt Wells	World
1 June 1915	22 June 1915	(United States) Mike Glover	World
22 June 1915	31 August 1915	(United States) Jack Britton	World
31 August 1915	24 April 1916	(United Kingdom) Ted Kid Lewis	World
24 April 1916	25 June 1917	(United States) Jack Britton	World
25 June 1917	17 March 1919	(United Kingdom) Ted Kid Lewis	World
17 March 1919	1 November 1922	(United States) Jack Britton	World/NYSAC/NBA
1 November 1922	20 May 1926	(United States) Mickey Walker	NBA/NYSAC
Walker was stripped of his NYSAC title 6 June 1923 for failing to fight Dave Shade in six months. He would eventually be reinstated 31 October 1923.
6 June 1923	27 July 1923	(United States) Dave Shade	NYSAC
27 July 1923	8 October 1923 (Stripped)	(United States) Jimmy Jones	NYSAC
20 May 1926	3 June 1927	(United States) Pete Latzo	NBA/NYSAC
3 June 1927	25 July 1929	(United States) Joe Dundee	NBA/NYSAC
25 July 1929	9 May 1930	(United States) Jackie Fields	NBA/NYSAC
9 May 1930	5 September 1930	(United States) Jack Thompson	NBA/NYSAC
5 September 1930	14 April 1931	(United States) Tommy Freeman	NBA/NYSAC
14 April 1931	23 October 1931	(United States) Jack Thompson	NBA/NYSAC
23 October 1931	28 January 1932	(Canada) Lou Brouillard	NBA/NYSAC
28 January 1932	22 February 1933	(United States) Jackie Fields	NBA/NYSAC
22 February 1933	29 May 1933	(United States) Young Corbett III	NBA/NYSAC
29 May 1933	28 May 1934	(Republic of Ireland) Jimmy McLarnin	NBA/NYSAC
28 May 1934	17 September 1934	(United States) Barney Ross	NBA/NYSAC
17 September 1934	28 May 1935	(Republic of Ireland) Jimmy McLarnin	NBA/NYSAC
28 May 1935	31 May 1938	(United States) Barney Ross	NBA/NYSAC
31 May 1938	4 October 1940	(United States) Henry Armstrong	NBA/NYSAC
4 October 1940	29 July 1941	(United States) Fritzie Zivic	NBA/NYSAC
29 July 1941	1 February 1946	(United States) Freddie 'Red' Cochrane	NBA/NYSAC
1 February 1946	25 September 1946 (vacated)	(United States) Marty Servo	NBA/NYSAC
20 December 1946	9 August 1950 (vacated)	(United States) Sugar Ray Robinson	NBA/NYSAC
14 March 1951	18 May 1951	(United States) Johnny Bratton	NBA
18 May 1951	29 August 1951	(Cuba) Kid Gavilán	NBA/NYSAC
4 February 1952	20 October 1954	(Cuba) Kid Gavilán	NBA/NYSAC
20 October 1954	1 April 1955	(United States) Johnny Saxton	NBA/NYSAC
1 April 1955	10 June 1955	(United States) Tony DeMarco	NBA/NYSAC
10 June 1955	14 March 1956	(United States) Carmen Basilio	NBA/NYSAC
14 March 1956	12 September 1956	(United States) Johnny Saxton	NBA/NYSAC
12 September 1956	22 February 1957 (vacated)	(United States) Carmen Basilio	NBA/NYSAC
6 June 1958	5 December 1958	(United States) Virgil Akins	NBA/NYSAC
5 December 1958	27 May 1960	(United States) Don Jordan	NBA/NYSAC
27 May 1960	1 April 1961	(Cuba) Benny 'Kid' Paret	NBA/NYSAC
1 April 1961	30 September 1961	(United States Virgin Islands) Emile Griffith	NBA/NYSAC
30 September 1961	24 March 1962	(Cuba) Benny 'Kid' Paret	NBA/NYSAC
24 March 1962	21 March 1963	(United States Virgin Islands) Emile Griffith	NBA/NYSAC—WBA/WBC
Title Splits into WBA and WBC Belts during Griffith's reign
21 March 1963	8 June 1963	(Cuba) Luis Manuel Rodríguez	WBA/WBC
8 June 1963	10 December 1965 (vacated)	(United States Virgin Islands) Emile Griffith	WBA/WBC
28 November 1966	18 April 1969	(United States) Curtis Cokes	WBA/WBC
18 April 1969	3 December 1970	(Mexico) José Nápoles	WBA/WBC
3 December 1970	4 June 1971	(United States) Billy Backus	WBA/WBC
4 June 1971	6 December 1975	(Mexico) José Nápoles	WBA/WBC
16 September 1981	9 November 1982 (retires)	(United States) Sugar Ray Leonard	WBA/WBC
Title Split into WBA, WBC, and IBF Belts
6 December 1985	27 September 1986	(United States) Donald Curry	WBA/WBC/IBF
27 September 1986	22 August 1987	(United Kingdom) Lloyd Honeyghan	WBA/WBC/IBF
13 December 2003	5 February 2005	(United States) Cory Spinks	WBA/WBC/IBF
5 February 2005	7 January 2006	(United States) Zab Judah	WBA/WBC/IBF
29 July 2023	9 November 2023	(United States) Terence Crawford	WBO/WBA (Super)/WBC/IBF

=== WBC ===
Date won	Date lost	Name	
Separate WBA and WBC champions began when José Nápoles gives up WBA title
8 December 1962	21 March 1963	(United States Virgin Islands) Emile Griffith	WBC
21 March 1963	8 June 1963	(Cuba) Luis Manuel Rodriguez	WBC
8 June 1963	25 April 1966-Vacated	(United States Virgin Islands) Emile Griffith	WBC
24 August 1966	18 April 1969	(United States) Curtis Cokes	WBC
18 April 1969	3 December 1970	(Mexico) José Napoles	WBC
3 December 1970	4 June 1971	(United States) Billy Backus	WBC
4 June 1971	6 December 1975	(Mexico) José Napoles	WBC
6 December 1975	22 June 1976	(United Kingdom) John H Stracey	WBC
22 June 1976	14 January 1979	(Mexico) Carlos Palomino	WBC
14 January 1979	30 November 1979	(Puerto Rico) Wilfred Benítez	WBC
30 November 1979	20 June 1980	(United States) Sugar Ray Leonard	WBC
20 June 1980	25 November 1980	(Panama) Roberto Durán	WBC
25 November 1980	9 November 1982-Retired	(United States) Sugar Ray Leonard	WBC
13 August 1983	6 December 1985	(United States) Milton McCrory	WBC
6 December 1985	27 September 1986	(United States) Donald Curry	WBC
27 September 1986	28 October 1987	(United Kingdom) Lloyd Honeyghan	WBC
28 October 1987	29 March 1988	(Mexico) Jorge Vaca	WBC
29 March 1988	4 February 1989	(United Kingdom) Lloyd Honeyghan	WBC
4 February 1989	19 August 1990	(United States) Marlon Starling	WBC
19 August 1990	18 March 1991	(United States) Maurice Blocker	WBC
18 March 1991	29 November 1991	(Jamaica) Simon Brown	WBC
29 November 1991	6 March 1993	(United States) James McGirt	WBC
6 March 1993	12 April 1997	(United States) Pernell Whitaker	WBC
12 April 1997	18 September 1999	(United States) Oscar De La Hoya	WBC
18 September 1999	3 March 2000- Vacated	(Puerto Rico) Félix Trinidad	WBC
4 March 2000	17 June 2000	(United States) Oscar De La Hoya	WBC
17 June 2000	26 January 2002	(United States) Shane Mosley	WBC
26 January 2002	25 January 2003	(United States) Vernon Forrest	WBC
25 January 2003	13 December 2003	(Nicaragua) Ricardo Mayorga	WBC
13 December 2003	5 February 2005	(United States) Cory Spinks	WBC
5 February 2005	7 January 2006	(United States) Zab Judah	WBC
7 January 2006	4 November 2006	(Argentina) Carlos Manuel Baldomir	WBC
4 November 2006	6 June 2008- Retired	(United States) Floyd Mayweather Jr.	WBC
21 June 2008	16 April 2011	(United States) Andre Berto	WBC
16 April 2011	17 September 2011	(United States) Victor Ortiz	WBC
17 September 2011	12 September 2015- Retired	(United States) Floyd Mayweather Jr.	WBC
23 January 2016	4 March 2017	(United States) Danny García	WBC
4 March 2017	24 April 2018- Vacated	(United States) Keith Thurman	WBC
8 September 2018	28 September 2019	(United States) Shawn Porter	WBC
28 September 2019	29 July 2023	(United States) Errol Spence Jr.	WBC
29 July 2023	18 June 2024-Stripped	(United States) Terence Crawford	WBC
18 June 2024	21 February 2026	(United States) Mario Barrios	WBC
21 February 2026	Present	(United States) Ryan Garcia	WBC

=== WBA ===
Date won	Date lost	Name	
8 December 1962	21 March 1963	(United States Virgin Islands) Emile Griffith	WBA
21 March 1963	8 June 1963	(Cuba) Luis Manuel Rodriguez	WBA
8 June 1963	25 April 1966-Vacated	(United States Virgin Islands) Emile Griffith	WBA
24 August 1966	18 April 1969	(United States) Curtis Cokes	WBA
18 April 1969	3 December 1970	(Cuba) Jose Napoles	WBA
3 December 1970	4 June 1971	(United States) Billy Backus	WBA
4 June 1971	1975-Stripped	(Cuba) Jose Napoles	WBA
28 June 1975	17 July 1976	(Puerto Rico) Ángel Espada	WBA
17 July 1976	2 August 1980	(Mexico) Pipino Cuevas	WBA
2 August 1980	16 September 1981	(United States) Thomas Hearns	WBA
16 September 1981	9 November 1982-Retired	(United States) Sugar Ray Leonard	WBA
13 February 1983	27 September 1986	(United States) Donald Curry	WBA
27 September 1986	1987-Vacated	(United Kingdom) Lloyd Honeyghan	WBA
6 February 1987	22 August 1987	(United States) Mark Breland	WBA
22 August 1987	29 July 1988	(United States) Marlon Starling	WBA
29 July 1988	12 December 1988-Vacated	(Colombia) Tomas Molinares	WBA
4 February 1989	8 July 1990	(United States) Mark Breland	WBA
8 July 1990	19 January 1991	(United States) Aaron Davis	WBA
19 January 1991	31 October 1992	(United States) Meldrick Taylor	WBA
31 October 1992	4 June 1994	(Venezuela) Crisanto España	WBA
4 June 1994	17 October 1997-Vacated	(Ghana) Ike Quartey	WBA
10 October 1998	2000-Stripped	(United States) James Page	WBA
17 February 2001	30 March 2002	(Guyana) Andrew Lewis	WBA
30 March 2002	13 December 2003	(Nicaragua) Ricardo Mayorga	WBA Super Champion
12 September 2003	2 April 2005	(United States) Jose Antonio Rivera	WBA Regular Champion
13 December 2003	5 February 2005	(United States) Cory Spinks	WBA Super Champion
5 February 2005	7 January 2006-Stripped	(United States) Zab Judah	WBA Super Champion
2 April 2005	13 May 2006	(United States) Luis Collazo	WBA Regular Champion
13 May 2006	31 August 2006-Vacated	(United Kingdom) Ricky Hatton	WBA
2 December 2006	26 July 2008	(Puerto Rico) Miguel Cotto	WBA
26 July 2008	24 January 2009	(Mexico) Antonio Margarito	WBA Super Champion
3 October 2008	10 April 2009	(Ukraine) Yuriy Nuzhnenko	WBA Regular Champion
24 January 2009	22 May 2010-Stripped	(United States) Shane Mosley	WBA Super Champion
10 April 2009	29 April 2012	(Ukraine) Vyacheslav Senchenko	WBA Regular Champion
29 April 2012	22 June 2013	(United States) Paul Malignaggi	WBA
22 June 2013	14 December 2013	(United States) Adrien Broner	WBA
14 December 2013	3 May 2014	(Argentina) Marcos Maidana	WBA
3 May 2014	11 January 2016-Retired	(United States) Floyd Mayweather Jr.	WBA Super Champion
February 2015	7 November 2016	(United States) Keith Thurman	WBA Regular Champion
7 November 2016	20 July 2019	(United States) Keith Thurman	WBA Super Champion
7 November 2016	18 February 2017	(Russia) David Avanesyan	WBA Regular Champion
18 February 2017	3 October 2017-Vacated	(United States) Lamont Peterson	WBA Regular Champion
27 January 2018	15 July 2018	(Argentina) Lucas Matthysse	WBA Regular Champion
15 July 2018	20 July 2019	(Philippines) Manny Pacquiao	WBA Regular Champion
20 July 2019	29 January 2021-Stripped	(Philippines) Manny Pacquiao	WBA Super Champion
6 September 2020	29 January 2021-Elevated	(Cuba) Yordenis Ugás	WBA Regular Champion
29 January 2021	16 April 2022	(Cuba) Yordenis Ugás	WBA Super Champion
30 October 2021	16 April 2022	(Russia) Radzhab Butaev	WBA Regular Champion
16 April 2022	30 August 2024-Elevated	(Lithuania) Eimantas Stanionis	WBA Regular Champion
16 April 2022	29 July 2023	(United States) Errol Spence Jr.	WBA Super Champion
29 July 2023	30 August 2024	(United States) Terence Crawford	WBA Super Champion
30 August 2024	12 April 2025	(Lithuania) Eimantas Stanionis	WBA Champion
12 April 2025	1 August 2025-Vacated	(United States) Jaron Ennis	WBA Champion/WBA Super Champion
2 May 2025	1 August 2025-Elevated	(United States) Rolly Romero	WBA Regular Champion
1 August 2025	22 August 2026	(United States) Rolly Romero	WBA Champion
22 August 2026	Present	(United States) Teofimo Lopez	WBA Super Champion

=== IBF ===
Date won	Date lost	Name	
Title inaugurated
4 February 1984	27 September 1986	(United States) Donald Curry	IBF
27 September 1986	28 October 1987-Stripped	(United Kingdom) Lloyd Honeyghan	IBF
23 April 1988	4 October 1991-Vacated	(United States) Simon Brown	IBF
4 October 1991	19 June 1993	(United States) Maurice Blocker	IBF
19 June 1993	3 March 2000-Vacated	(Puerto Rico) Félix Trinidad	IBF
12 May 2001	12 December 2001-Vacated	(United States) Vernon Forrest	IBF
13 April 2002	22 March 2003	(Italy) Michele Piccirillo	IBF
22 March 2003	5 February 2005	(United States) Cory Spinks	IBF
5 February 2005	8 April 2006	(United States) Zab Judah	IBF
8 April 2006	20 June 2006-Vacated	(United States) Floyd Mayweather Jr.	IBF
28 October 2006	12 April 2008	(Puerto Rico) Kermit Cintron	IBF
12 April 2008	23 May 2008-Vacated	(Mexico) Antonio Margarito	IBF
2 August 2008	16 April 2009-Vacated	(Ghana) Joshua Clottey	IBF
1 August 2009	11 December 2009	(South Africa) Isaac Hlatshwayo	IBF
11 December 2009	3 September 2011	(Slovenia) Dejan Zavec	IBF
3 September 2011	8 November 2011-Vacated	(United States) Andre Berto	IBF
9 June 2012	20 October 2012	(United States) Randall Bailey	IBF
20 October 2012	7 December 2013	(United States) Devon Alexander	IBF
7 December 2013	16 August 2014	(United States) Shawn Porter	IBF
16 August 2014	27 May 2017	(United Kingdom) Kell Brook	IBF
27 May 2017	29 July 2023	(United States) Errol Spence Jr.	IBF
29 July 2023	9 November 2023-Stripped	(United States) Terence Crawford	IBF
9 November 2023	7 July 2025-Vacated	(United States) Jaron Ennis	IBF
13 Sep 2025	24 Jun 2026	(United Kingdom) Lewis Crocker	IBF
24 Jun 2026	Present	(Australia) Liam Paro	IBF

=== WBO ===
Date won	Date lost	Name	
Title inaugurated
6 May 1989	15 December 1989-Vacated	(Mexico) Genaro Leon	WBO
15 December 1989	12 February 1993	(United States) Manning Galloway	WBO
12 February 1993	16 October 1993-Vacated	(Denmark) Gert Bo Jacobsen	WBO
16 October 1993	13 April 1996	(Republic of Ireland) Eamonn Loughran	WBO
13 April 1996	6 October 1996-Vacated	(Mexico) José Luis López	WBO
22 February 1997	1997-Vacated	(Romania) Michael Loewe	WBO
14 February 1998	6 May 2000	(Russia) Ahmed Kotiev	WBO
6 May 2000	16 March 2002-Vacated	(Puerto Rico) Daniel Santos	WBO
16 March 2002	14 July 2007	(Mexico) Antonio Margarito	WBO
14 July 2007	9 February 2008	(United States) Paul Williams	WBO
9 February 2008	7 June 2008	(Puerto Rico) Carlos Quintana	WBO
7 June 2008	12 November 2008-Vacated	(United States) Paul Williams	WBO
21 February 2009	14 November 2009	(Puerto Rico) Miguel Cotto	WBO
14 November 2009	9 June 2012	(Philippines) Manny Pacquiao	WBO
9 June 2012	12 April 2014	(United States) Timothy Bradley	WBO
12 April 2014	2 May 2015	(Philippines) Manny Pacquiao	WBO
2 May 2015	6 July 2015-Stripped	(United States) Floyd Mayweather Jr.	WBO
6 July 2015	9 February 2016-Vacated	(United States) Timothy Bradley	WBO
5 March 2016	5 November 2016	(United States) Jessie Vargas	WBO
5 November 2016	2 July 2017	(Philippines) Manny Pacquiao	WBO
2 July 2017	6 June 2018	(Australia) Jeff Horn	WBO
9 June 2018	12 August 2024	(United States) Terence Crawford	WBO
12 August 2024	22 November 2025	(United States) Brian Norman Jr.	WBO
22 November 2025	Present	(United States) Devin Haney	WBO

== See also ==
- List of British world boxing champions
