= Rogelio Ruvalcaba =

Mexican boxer (born 1988)

Personal information
- Nickname: Tijuanense
- Born: 11 September 1988 (age 37) Tijuana, Baja California, Mexico
- Height: 1.89 m (6 ft 2 in)
- Weight: Light heavyweight

Boxing career
- Reach: 191 cm (75 in)
- Stance: Southpaw

Boxing record
- Total fights: 11
- Wins: 10
- Win by KO: 9
- Losses: 1
- Draws: 0
- No contests: 0

Rogelio Ruvalcaba (born 11 September 1988) is a Mexican professional boxer. As an amateur, he competed at the 2009 Panamerican Championships.

== Amateur career ==
Ruvalcaba is a Mexican Junior National Champion. He then won a bronze and two silver medals at the Mexican National Amateur Championships in the Elite Category. He reached the quarterfinals of the 2009 Panamerican Championships, where he was eliminated by Lenin Castillo.

== Professional career ==
Ruvalcaba made his professional debut on 27 August 2010, defeating Israel Villa via first-round technical knockout in Tijuana.
