= Paddy Duffy =

Irish-American and the first World Welterweight champion

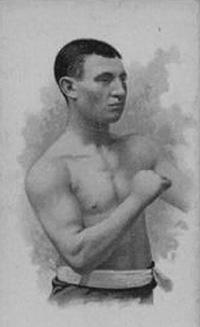

Personal information
- Nationality: (United States) American
- Born: November 12, 1864 Boston, Massachusetts
- Died: July 10, 1890 (aged 25) Boston, Massachusetts
- Height: 5 ft 7 in (1.70 m)
- Weight: Welterweight

Boxing career
- Stance: Orthodox; Right-handed

Boxing record
- Total fights: 50
- Wins: 31
- Win by KO: 18
- Losses: 3
- Draws: 16

Paddy Duffy (November 12, 1864 – July 10, 1890) was an American boxer of Irish descent. He was considered the first world welterweight champion of boxing's gloved era.

== Boxing career highlights ==
Paddy Duffy was born on November 12, 1864, to an Irish-American family in Boston. According to one source he worked for a while in his youth as a bootblack or shoeshine in a Boston West End saloon. He began his career as a boxer around 1883.

Duffy won his first professional fight by knockout over Skin Doherty around February 1, 1884, at the age of 19.

In 1884, he fought three bouts with Paddy Sullivan in Massachusetts with the first two ending in draws, and the third on June 28, 1884, ending in a six round win by points decision in Gloucester according to the Boston Daily Globe. The bout was fast and hotly contested but the referee ruled in Duffy's favor.

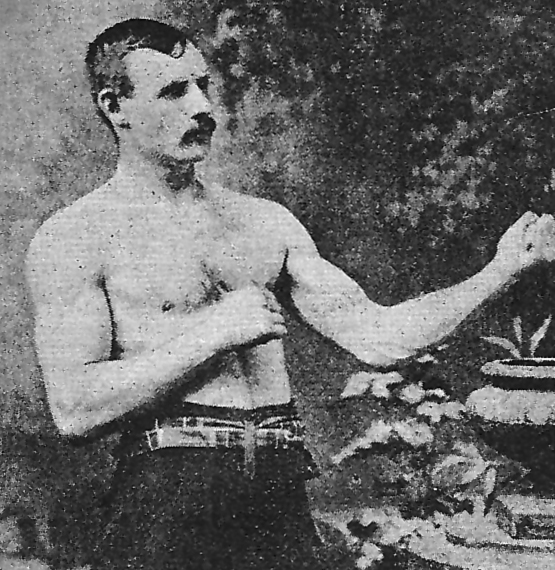
Jack McGee

He lost to hard hitting Jack McGee in Boston on December 19, 1884, in a fast second round knockout before a crowd of around 100. Both contestants were Boston natives, though McGee was four years older. After this rare knockout loss, Duffy lost only once more in his career.

Black boxer Walter Edgerton, better known as "Kentucky Rosebud" fell to Duffy in a four round points decision in Philadelphia on July 28, 1886. Though Duffy towered over his opponent, Edgerton gave an even fight in the third scoring with a right to the side of his opponents head near the end of the round. The fit black boxer stood up to considerable punishment in the short contest and used agility and speed to avoid many of the blows he received in the first round. Duffy dominated the first two rounds, knocking his opponent to the mat in the first, and though the fourth began cautiously, he backed Edgerton against the ropes inflicting a rain of blows. Edgerton performed a double shuffle at the end of the bout, and though he often entertained during his matches, he was a serious pugilist.

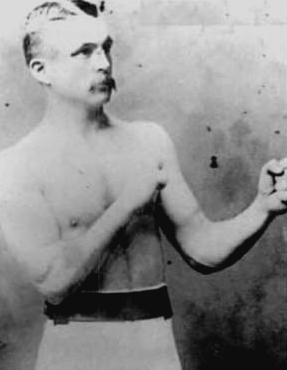
Billy Frazier

Duffy fought Billy Frazier to a four round draw on January 14, 1887, at the Adelphi Ring in New Bedford, Massachusetts. Additional meetings, fought as exhibitions took place with Frazier that winter and into the spring. Frazier was a well-known short, muscular, scientifically skilled boxer, who would later teach boxing at Harvard College.

Duffy drew with Bill Dunn on March 1, 1887, at the Theatre Comique in Philadelphia. The bout was close, with intense fighting on both sides, particularly in the third round, when Duffy went frequently to Dunn's mid-section. The fourth saw Duffy scoring frequently again to Dunn's midsection, and at least twice to his eye, though he was not quite able to finish him due to clinching. The Times of Philadelphia felt Duffy had the better of the bout by a shade, but the referee called a draw to the close contest.

He fought a four fight series with Jack McGinty in Boston in 1887, which ended in a seven round win on April 19, two seven round draws in May and October, and an eight round draw on November 17, 1888. The club which sponsored their bout did not allow more than eight round bouts. Duffy defeated McGinty on February 9, 1888, by a ninth technical knockout before a crowd of around 300. The match had been close until McGinty broke his thumb in the ninth, and was forced to retire at the end of the round. McGinty had seemed exhausted by the end of the sixth, but recovered enough to fight on. The Boston Globe, recognizing the skill of both boxers, considered their 1888 meeting an American welterweight championship.

Duffy won a fourth round technical knockout against Tom Murphy on May 10, 1888. In a close bout, Duffy staggered Murphy at the close of the second that may have allowed him to subsequently end the bout, if not for the closing bell. Making it clear the match was nearing an end, Duffy dominated the third, punching Murphy across the ring, with little return, and putting him down twice for brief counts. In the fourth, a right from Duffy sent Murphy down for a long count of twelve, and when he arose, Duffy put him to the mat four additional times.

In a bout with Charles Gleason, on January 7, 1889, Duffy was given "the fight of his life", in a ten round points decision in Boston. The official ruling was a draw, but Gleason proved a hard hitter and a clever sparrer and was game throughout the match. Gleason seemed to do his better work in the later rounds, pushing the judges to make the draw ruling.

=== Taking the world welterweight championship, October, 1888 ===
Duffy fought an important bout against William McMillan on October 30, 1888, winning from a seventeenth round foul, around Fort Foote, Virginia, South of Washington, D.C. McMillan had taken the championship of both Lancastershire England against Tom Keenan and of Scotland against Tom Kelly around 1887. Both competitors wore thin, skin tight gloves. As a result of McMillan's championship status, Duffy claimed the world welterweight championship after his victory, though it was recognized mostly in the United States at the time. After the fourteenth round, Duffy clearly dominated the fighting with brutal blows to McMillan. The bout was fought before an audience of around 100 near the shore of the Potomac for a purse of around $350 and lasted around one hour and eight minutes. Duffy was not considered seriously injured after the bout, except for his hands, though McMillan was considered in a dangerous condition from the long and brutal exchange, with serious swelling in his right eye. According to the Saint Paul Globe, and other sources the fight was called from a foul when McMillan headbutted Duffy in the final round, though head butting fouls by McMillan may have started as early as the eleventh round. According to one source, the actual fighting took place in an old barn with a ring, six miles south of Washington, D.C.

=== Securing the championship against Tom Meadows, March, 1889 ===
He secured the world welterweight title against British-born Australian champion Tom Meadows on March 29, 1889, in an exhausting 45 round bout at San Francisco's California Athletic Club. The purse was $1,000, and light gloves were used. One reporter wrote that spectators lost interest when both fighters occasionally ceased boxing in the latter rounds, with Meadows leaning on a post, and Duffy folding his arms in the center of the ring. It would have been deadly in a forty-five round bout for both boxers to have been in continuous combat. Meadows was down four times in the forty-third round and three times more in the forty-fourth. According to Chicago's Inter-Ocean, McMillan fouled when he realized he could not win the bout, and started as early as the tenth round. Duffy won from a disqualification in the final round that was caused by a head butt from Meadows according to the San Francisco Chronicle. Meadows was weak and groggy by the forth-fifth and clinching frequently, which gave him greater opportunity to butt with his head. The referee agreed when Duffy's seconds claimed the head butting foul.

According to Cyber Boxing Zone, Duffy fought three additional fights in 1889, an exhibition with Patsy Kerrigan on April 24, a no decision bout with Jimmy Conley in May, and a second no decision benefit bout with Johnny Reagan in Brooklyn on August 26, though these bouts were less well publicized.

== Death at 25 from tuberculosis ==
Just over a year after his win over Tom Meadows, while still reigning champion, he died of tuberculosis, then known as consumption, on July 10, 1890, at the age of 25, at his home at 5 Endicott Court in North Boston. He had been diagnosed with an incurable lung and heart ailment around six months earlier, though may have suffered from the illness for at least a year. Friends attributed his health problems to his boxing career, particularly his last brutal bout with Tom Meadows where he received frequent blows to his chest. He was buried in Holy Cross Cemetery in Malden, Massachusetts.

Duffy ended his career with a 33-3-21 win-loss-draw record with 18 knockout victories. He was inducted into the International Boxing Hall of Fame in 2008.

== Professional boxing record ==
51 fights	32 wins	1 loss
By knockout	18	1
By decision	13	0
By disqualification	1	0
Draws	16	
No contests	1	
Newspaper decisions/draws	1	

All Newspaper decisions are regarded as “no decision” bouts as they have “resulted in neither boxer winning or losing, and would therefore not count as part of their official fight record."

No.	Result	Record	Opponent	Type	Round	Date	Location	Notes
52	Win	31–3–16 (2)	Tom Meadows	DQ	45 (?)	Mar 29, 1889	California A.C., San Francisco, California, U.S.	Retained world welterweight title; Duffy died from tuberculosis on July 10, 1890.
51	NC	30–3–16 (2)	Jimmy Conley	ND	?	Feb 1, 1889	Temple Hall, Cambridge, Massachusetts, U.S.	Exact date and decision unknown
50	Draw	30–3–16 (1)	Charles Gleason	PTS	10	Jan 7, 1889	Pelican Club, Boston, Massachusetts, U.S.	
49	Win	30–3–15 (1)	Billy McMillian	KO	17 (?)	Oct 30, 1888	Fort Foote, Virginia, U.S.	Won inaugural world welterweight title
48	Draw	29–3–15 (1)	Dick Moorehouse	PTS	6	Jun 13, 1888	Way Street Gymnasium, Boston, Massachusetts, U.S.	
47	Win	29–3–14 (1)	Paddy Sullivan	RTD	8 (10)	Jun 12, 1888	Racquet Club, Providence, Rhode Island, U.S.	
46	Win	28–3–14 (1)	Tom Murphy	TKO	4 (?)	May 10, 1888	Athenian Club, Boston, Massachusetts, U.S.	
45	Win	27–3–14 (1)	Dan Custy	TKO	3 (?)	Apr 14, 1888	Athenian Club, Boston, Massachusetts, U.S.	
44	Win	26–3–14 (1)	Jack McGinty	TKO	9 (10)	Feb 9, 1888	Athenian Club, Boston, Massachusetts, U.S.	
43	Win	25–3–14 (1)	Jim Meehan	PTS	7 (?)	Jan 17, 1888	Athenian Club, Boston, Massachusetts, U.S.	
42	Draw	24–3–14 (1)	Jack McGinty	PTS	8	Nov 17, 1887	Athenian Club, Boston, Massachusetts, U.S.	
41	Draw	24–3–13 (1)	Jack McGinty	PTS	7	May 17, 1887	Athenian Club, Boston, Massachusetts, U.S.	
40	Win	24–3–12 (1)	Jack McGinty	PTS	7	Apr 19, 1887	Athenian Club, Boston, Massachusetts, U.S.	
39	Draw	23–3–12 (1)	Frank Burke	PTS	4	Mar 5, 1887	Theatre Comique, Philadelphia, Pennsylvania, U.S.	
38	Draw	23–3–11 (1)	Fred Woods	PTS	4	Mar 3, 1887	Theatre Comique, Philadelphia, Pennsylvania, U.S.	
37	Win	23–3–10 (1)	Bill Dunn	KO	3 (?)	Mar 2, 1887	Boston, Massachusetts, U.S.	
36	Draw	22–3–10 (1)	Bill Dunn	PTS	4	Mar 1, 1887	Theatre Comique, Philadelphia, Pennsylvania, U.S.	Exact date unknown
35	Win	22–3–9 (1)	Tommy Wells	KO	5 (?)	Feb 18, 1887	Athenian Club, Boston, Massachusetts, U.S.	
34	Draw	21–3–9 (1)	Bill Frazier	PTS	4	Jan 14, 1887	Adelphi Rink, New Bedford, Massachusetts, U.S.	
33	Draw	21–3–8 (1)	Tom Wall	PTS	4	Aug 21, 1886	Clarks Club, Philadelphia, Pennsylvania, U.S.	
32	Win	21–3–7 (1)	Tommy Merrill	TKO	3 (4)	Aug 20, 1886	Clarks Club, Philadelphia, Pennsylvania, U.S.	
31	Win	20–3–7 (1)	Frank Burke	PTS	4	Aug 16, 1886	Clarks Club, Philadelphia, Pennsylvania, U.S.	
30	Loss	19–3–7 (1)	Billy Teese	PTS	4	Aug 7, 1886	Clarks Club, Philadelphia, Pennsylvania, U.S.	
29	Win	19–2–7 (1)	Charles Bull McCarthy	PTS	4	Aug 6, 1886	Clarks Club, Philadelphia, Pennsylvania, U.S.	
28	Draw	18–2–7 (1)	Charles Gleason	PTS	4	Aug 4, 1886	Clarks Club, Philadelphia, Pennsylvania, U.S.	
27	Win	18–2–6 (1)	Charley Hermon	KO	2 (8)	Aug 2, 1886	Clarks Club, Philadelphia, Pennsylvania, U.S.	Exact date unknown
26	Draw	17–2–6 (1)	Frank Burke	PTS	4	Jul 31, 1886	Clark's Theatre, Philadelphia, Pennsylvania, U.S.	
25	Win	17–2–5 (1)	Kentucky Rosebud	PTS	4	Jul 28, 1886	Clarks Club, Philadelphia, Pennsylvania, U.S.	
24	Win	16–2–5 (1)	Charles Gleason	PTS	4	Jul 27, 1886	Clarks Club, Philadelphia, Pennsylvania, U.S.	
23	Win	15–2–5 (1)	Charles Gleason	PTS	4	Jul 17, 1886	Philadelphia, Pennsylvania, U.S.	
22	Win	14–2–5 (1)	Charley White	PTS	4	Jul 5, 1886	Philadelphia, Pennsylvania, U.S.	Exact date unknown
21	Win	13–2–5 (1)	Frank Brooks	PTS	4	Jul 1, 1886	Philadelphia, Pennsylvania, U.S.	Exact date unknown
20	Win	12–2–5 (1)	Butler's Unknown	PTS	4	Jun 15, 1886	United States of America	Exact date unknown
19	Win	11–2–5 (1)	Pete Conley	PTS	4	Jun 10, 1886	Philadelphia, Pennsylvania, U.S.	Exact date unknown
18	Win	10–2–5 (1)	Danny Shea	KO	7 (?)	May 1, 1886	Baltimore, Maryland, U.S.	Exact date unknown
17	Win	9–2–5 (1)	George Milton	KO	2 (?)	Apr 24, 1886	Washington, D.C., U.S.	
16	Win	8–2–5 (1)	Billy Nalley	KO	4 (?)	Apr 22, 1886	Washington, D.C., U.S.	
15	Win	7–2–5 (1)	Billy Young	KO	2 (?)	Mar 1, 1886	Baltimore, Maryland, U.S.	Exact date unknown
14	Draw	6–2–5 (1)	Billy Young	PTS	6	Jan 28, 1886	Baltimore, Maryland, U.S.	
13	Win	6–2–4 (1)	Bill Rosamond	KO	4 (?)	Oct 27, 1885	Boston, Massachusetts, U.S.	
12	Draw	5–2–4 (1)	George Wilson	PTS	4	Jun 8, 1885	Riverside Kennel Club Rooms, Boston, Massachusetts, U.S.	
11	Win	5–2–3 (1)	Dan Murphy	KO	3 (?)	Feb 18, 1885	Boston, Massachusetts, U.S.	
10	Draw	4–2–3 (1)	Jack McGee	NWS	6	Jan 27, 1885	West Boston A.C., Boston, Massachusetts, U.S.	
9	Loss	4–2–3	Jack McGee	KO	2 (?)	Dec 19, 1884	Boston, Massachusetts, U.S.	
8	Draw	4–1–3	Tug Collins	PTS	6	Oct 31, 1884	Boston, Massachusetts, U.S.	
7	Loss	4–1–2	Paddy Sullivan	PTS	6	Jun 28, 1884	Western Ave A.C., Gloucesterl, Massachusetts, U.S.	
6	Draw	4–0–2	Paddy Sullivan	PTS	6	Jun 25, 1884	Hub A.C., Boston, Massachusetts, U.S.	
5	Draw	4–0–1	Paddy Sullivan	PTS	6	Jun 1, 1884	Lowell, Massachusetts, U.S.	Exact date unknown
4	Win	4–0	Bob Lyons	KO	4 (?)	May 15, 1884	Boston, Massachusetts, U.S.	
3	Win	3–0	Bob Lyons	KO	11 (?)	Apr 1, 1884	Boston, Massachusetts, U.S.	Exact date unknown
2	Win	2–0	Young Shannon	PTS	4	Mar 1, 1884	Boston, Massachusetts, U.S.	Exact date unknown
1	Win	1–0	Skin Doherty	KO	3 (?)	Feb 1, 1884	Boston, Massachusetts, U.S.	Exact date unknown

== See also ==
- Lineal championship
- List of welterweight boxing champions

Achievements
Inaugural Champion	World Welterweight Champion; October 30, 1888 – July 1890; Died from tuberculosis	Vacant Title next held by Mysterious Billy Smith
