= Boxing at the 1988 Summer Olympics – Lightweight =

Olympic boxing tournament

Lightweight boxing at the Games of the XXIV Olympiad
- Venue: Jamsil Students' Gymnasium
- Dates: 19 September – 1 October 1988
- Competitors: 39 from 39 nations

Medalists
1st place, gold medalist(s)		Andreas Zülow	East Germany
2nd place, silver medalist(s)		George Cramne	Sweden
3rd place, bronze medalist(s)		Nergüin Enkhbat	Mongolia
3rd place, bronze medalist(s)		Romallis Ellis	United States

The men's lightweight event was part of the boxing programme at the 1988 Summer Olympics. The weight class allowed boxers weighing up to 60 kilograms to compete. The competition was held from 19 September to 1 October, 1988. 39 boxers from 39 nations competed. Andreas Zülow won the gold medal.

== Medalists ==
Gold	Andreas Zülow; East Germany
Silver	George Cramne; Sweden
Bronze	Nergüin Enkhbat; Mongolia
Bronze	Romallis Ellis; United States

== Results ==
The following boxers took part in the event:

Rank	Name	Country
1	Andreas Zülow	East Germany
2	George Cramne	Sweden
3T	Nergüin Enkhbat	Mongolia
3T	Romallis Ellis	United States
5T	Charlie Kane	Great Britain
5T	Kamal Marjouane	Morocco
5T	Emil Chuprenski	Bulgaria
5T	Mohamed Hegazi	Egypt
9T	Michael Carruth	Ireland
9T	Phat Kongrum	Thailand
9T	István Turu	Hungary
9T	Héctor Arroyo	Puerto Rico
9T	Kassim Traoré	Mali
9T	Mark Kennedy	Jamaica
9T	Azzedine Saïd	Algeria
9T	Kostya Tszyu	Soviet Union
17T	Satoru Higashi	Japan
17T	John Elson Mkangala	Malawi
17T	Asif Kamran Dar	Canada
17T	Adrianus Taroreh	Indonesia
17T	Jean-Paul Bonatou	Cameroon
17T	José Pérez	Venezuela
17T	Kibar Tatar	Turkey
17T	Tommy Gbay	Liberia
17T	Lee Gang-seok	South Korea
17T	Tobi Pelly	Sudan
17T	Terepai Maea	Cook Islands
17T	Eduardo de la Peña	Guam
17T	Shakes Kubuitsile	Botswana
17T	Blessing Onoko	Nigeria
17T	Giorgio Campanella	Italy
17T	Sean Knight	Barbados
33T	Lameck Mbao	Zambia
33T	Dalbahadur Ranamagar	Nepal
33T	Charles Lubulwa	Uganda
33T	Daniel Freitas	Uruguay
33T	Patrick Waweru	Kenya
33T	Leopoldo Cantancio	Philippines
33T	Guillermo Tamez	Mexico

=== First round ===
- Azzedine Said (ALG) def. Lameck Mbao (ZAM), KO-2
- Mohamed Regazy (EGY) def. Dal Bahadur Ranamagar (NEP), 5:0
- Blessing Onoko (NGA) def. Charles Lubulwa (UGA), RSC-3
- Giorgio Campanella (ITA) def. Daniel Freitas (URU), RSC-3
- Andreas Zülow (GDR) def. Patrick Waweru (KEN), 5:0
- Konstantin Tszyu (URS) def. Leopoldo Cantancio (PHI), KO-1
- Sean Knight (BRB) def. Guillermo Tamez (MEX), 5:0

=== Second round ===
- Michael Carruth (IRL) def. Satoru Higashi (JPN), 5:0
- George Cramne (SWE) def. John Elson Mkangala (MLW), 5:0
- Phat Kongrum (THA) def. Asif Dar (CAN), RSC-2
- Charles Kane (GBR) def. Adrian Taroreh (INA), 5:0
- István Turu (HUN) def. Jean-Paul Bonatou (CMR), 5:0
- Nergüin Enkhbat (MGL) def. José Pérez (VEN), 5:0
- Héctor Arroyo (PUR) def. Kibar Tatar (TUR), 5:0
- Kamal Marjouane (MAR) def. Tommy Gbay (LBR) 5:0
- Romallis Ellis (USA) def. Lee Kang-Su (KOR), 5:0
- Kassim Traoré (MLI) def. Tobi Pelly (SUD), 5:0
- Mark Kennedy (JAM) def. Terepai Maea (CIS), RSC-1
- Emil Chuprenski (BUL) def. Eduardo de la Peña (GUA), RSC-2
- Azzedine Said (ALG) def. Shake Kubuitsile (BTS), RSC-2
- Mohamed Regazy (EGY) def. Blessing Onoko (NGA), 5:0
- Andreas Zülow (GDR) def. Giorgio Campanella (ITA), 5:0
- Konstantin Tszyu (URS) def. Sean Knight (BRB), RSC-1

=== Third round ===
- George Cramne (SWE) def. Michael Carruth (IRL), KO-1
- Charles Kane (GBR) def. Phat Hongram (THA), 4:1
- Nergüin Enkhbat (MGL) def. István Turu (HUN), RSC-3
- Kamal Marjouane (MAR) def. Héctor Arroyo (PUR), 5:0
- Romallis Ellis (USA) def. Kassim Traoré (MLI), RSC-2
- Emil Chuprenski (BUL) def. Mark Kennedy (JAM), 5:0
- Mohamed Regazy (EGY) def. Azzedine Said (ALG), 5:0
- Andreas Zülow (GDR) def. Konstantin Tszyu (URS), 3:2

=== Quarterfinals ===
- George Cramne (SWE) def. Charles Kane (GBR), 4:1
- Nergüin Enkhbat (MGL) def. Kamal Marjouane (MAR), 5:0
- Romallis Ellis (USA) def. Emil Chuprenski (BUL), 3:2
- Andreas Zülow (GDR) def. Mohamed Regazy (EGY), 5:0

=== Semifinals ===
- George Cramne (SWE) def. Nergüin Enkhbat (MGL), 3:2
- Andreas Zülow (GDR) def. Romallis Ellis (USA), 5:0

=== Final ===
- Andreas Zülow (GDR) def. George Cramne (SWE), 5:0
