= Daniel Freitas =

Daniel Freitas may refer to:

- Daniel Freitas (boxer), Uruguayan boxer
- Daniel Freitas (cyclist), Portuguese cyclist
- Daniel Freitas (politician), Brazilian politician

== See also ==
- Daniel Correa Freitas, Brazilian footballer
