= Oscar De La Hoya vs. Rafael Ruelas =

Boxing match

La Batalla
- Date: May 6, 1995
- Venue: Caesars Palace, Paradise, Nevada, U.S.
- Title(s) on the line: IBF and WBO lightweight titles

Tale of the tape
Boxer	Rafael Ruelas	Oscar De La Hoya
Nickname		The Golden Boy
Hometown	Yerbabuena, Jalisco, Mexico	East Los Angeles, California, U.S.
Purse	$500,000	$1,000,000
Pre-fight record	43–1 (34 KO)	17–0 (15 KO)
Age	24 years	22 years, 3 months
Height	5 ft 11 in (180 cm)	5 ft 10 in (178 cm)
Weight	135 lb (61 kg)	134 1/2 lb (61 kg)
Style	Orthodox	Orthodox
Recognition	IBF; Lightweight Champion; The Ring; No. 2 Ranked Lightweight	WBO; Lightweight Champion; The Ring; No. 3 Ranked Lightweight

Result
- De La Hoya wins via 2nd-round TKO

Oscar De La Hoya vs. Rafael Ruelas, billed as La Batalla, was a professional boxing match contested on May 6, 1995, for the IBF and WBO lightweight championship. The fight is notable for being the first pay-per-view headlined by De La Hoya, who would eventually go on to become the second biggest draw in boxing pay-per-view history.

== Background ==
Only two years into his professional career, the then 22-year-old Oscar De La Hoya was the reigning WBO lightweight champion and had already captured two world titles in two different divisions after previously holding the WBO junior lightweight title. De La Hoya had just made the third successful defense against arguably his toughest opponent to date, defeating three-time super featherweight world champion John John Molina by unanimous decision. De La Hoya's victory over Molina would officially set up a shot at his first major world title against IBF lightweight champion Rafael Ruelas, who had made two successful defenses after winning the title from Freddie Pendleton the previous year.

The fight was heavily hyped and HBO decided to air the bout on pay-per-view (via their pay-per-view service TVKO) after De La Hoya had made several high-rated appearances on HBO World Championship Boxing. It was the first of 19 pay-per-view events that would be headlined by De La Hoya.

== The fight ==
De La Hoya had little trouble with Ruelas and dominated the first round with his left jabs, landing 24 of them, while Ruelas was unable to get going offensively and didn't land a single jab in the round. Early in the round De La Hoya caught Ruelas with a shot that seemed to daze Rualas and affected his balance throughout the round. De La Hoya ended the fight in the second. With a little past a minute gone by, De La Hoya dropped Ruelas to the canvas with a left hook. Rualas got back up, and though clearly hurt, was allowed to continue. De La Hoya quickly dropped Ruelas for the second time with a right hand soon after. Referee Richard Steele again allowed Ruelas to continue, but De La Hoya again went on the attack and landed a flurry of unanswered punches, causing Steele to quickly step in and end the fight. at 1:43 of the round.

== Aftermath ==
The IBF then ordered De La Hoya to defend against Miguel Julio. He would instead relinquish the title and defended the WBO title against undefeated Genaro Hernández, who relinquished the WBA super-featherweight title to take the bout.

== Undercard ==
Confirmed bouts:

== Broadcasting ==
Country	Broadcaster
Mexico	TV Azteca
United Kingdom	BBC
United States	HBO

Preceded by vs. Billy Schwer	Rafael Ruelas's bouts 6 May 1995	Succeeded by vs. George Scott
Preceded by vs. John John Molina	Oscar De La Hoya's bouts 6 May 1995	Succeeded by vs. Genaro Hernández
