= Andreas Zülow =

East German boxer

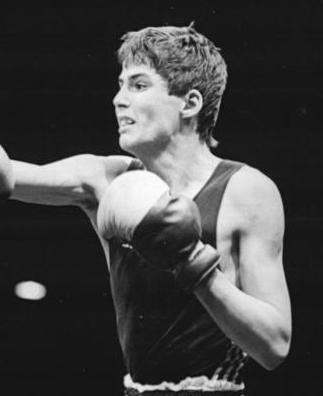
- Zülow in 1985

Personal information
- Full name: Andreas Zülow
- Nationality: East Germany
- Born: 23 October 1965 (age 60) Ludwigslust, Bezirk Schwerin, East Germany
- Height: 1.75 m (5 ft 9 in)
- Weight: 61 kg (134 lb)

Sport
- Sport: Boxing
- Weight class: Lightweight
- Club: Schweriner SC, Schwerin
Medal record
Representing East Germany
Olympic Games
Gold medal – first place	1988 Seoul	Lightweight
World Amateur Championships
Silver medal – second place	1989 Moscow	Lightweight
Bronze medal – third place	1986 Reno	Featherweight
Representing Germany
European Amateur Championships
Silver medal – second place	1991 Gothenburg	Light Welterweight

Andreas Zülow (born 23 October 1965) is a retired amateur boxer from East Germany who won a Lightweight gold medal at the 1988 Summer Olympic Games. He also won the silver medal at the 1989 World Amateur Boxing Championships in Moscow, and the bronze medal at the 1986 World Amateur Boxing Championships in Reno.

== Amateur career ==
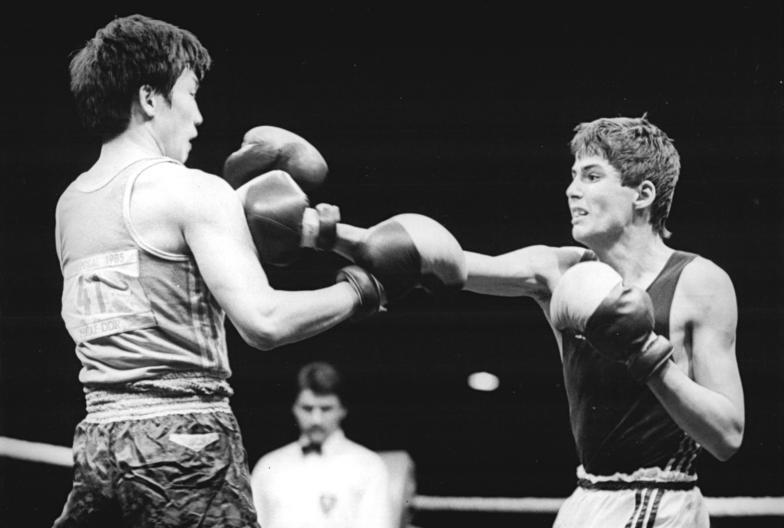
Zülow (right) battling North Korea's Jo Ryon-sik in 1985

Zülow had an outstanding amateur career, compiling a Record of 273 wins in 322 fights.

His highlights include:

- East German Featherweight Champion 1984–1986, East German Lightweight Champion 1987–1989, German Light Welterweight Champion 1992
- 1985 competed as a Featherweight at the European Championships in Budapest, Hungary
  - Defeated Raymond Gavia (France) PTS (5–0)
  - Lost to Tomasz Nowak (Poland) PTS (0–5)
- 1986 3rd place as a Featherweight at the World Championships in Reno, United States.
  - Defeated Klaus Niketta (West Germany) PTS (5–0)
  - Defeated Kunle La Costa (Nigeria) RSCH-1
  - Defeated Bobby McCarthy (Ireland) PTS (5–0)
  - Lost to Kelcie Banks (USA) PTS (1–4)
- 1987 competed as a Featherweight at the European Championships in Turin, Italy
  - Lost to Mikhail Kazaryan (Soviet Union) PTS (1–4)
- 1988 Lightweight Gold Medalist at the Seoul Olympics representing East Germany
  - Round of 64: Defeated Patrick Waweru (Kenya) PTS (5–0)
  - Round of 32: Defeated Giorgio Campanella (Italy) PTS (5–0)
  - Round of 16: Defeated Konstantin Tszyu (Soviet Union) PTS (3–2)
  - Quarterfinal: Defeated Mohamed Regazy (Egypt) PTS (5–0)
  - Semifinal: Defeated Romallis Ellis (USA) PTS (5–0)
  - Final: Defeated George Cramne (Sweden) PTS (5–0)
- 1989 2nd place as a Lightweight at the World Championships in Moscow, Soviet Union
  - Defeated Darrell Hiles (Australia) PTS (24–4)
  - Defeated Fared Cheklat (France) AB-3
  - Defeated Konstantin Tszyu (Soviet Union) PTS (17–14)
  - Lost to Julio Gonzalez (Cuba) PTS (+15-15)
- 1990 competed as a Lightweight at the Goodwill Games in Seattle, United States
  - Lost to Mikhail Kazaryan (Soviet Union) PTS (0–5)
- 1991 competed as a Light Welterweight at the World Championships in Sydney, Australia
  - Defeated Søren Søndergaard (Denmark) PTS (13–8)
  - Lost to Peter Richardson (Great Britain) PTS (12–22)
- 1991 2nd place as a Light Welterweight at the European Championships in Gothenburg, Sweden.
  - Lost the final to Konstantin Tszyu from the Soviet Union
- 1992 competed as a Light Welterweight at the Barcelona Olympics representing Germany. Results were:
  - Defeated Jae-Kyung Kim (South Korea) PTS (12–0)
  - Lost to Hector Vinent (Cuba) PTS (2–14)
- 1994 competed as a Light Welterweight at the Goodwill Games in Saint Petersburg, Russia
  - Lost to Hans Janssen (Netherlands) PTS (3–5)
