= Oscar De La Hoya vs. Giorgio Campanella =

Boxing match

Risings Stars: De La Hoya vs. Campanella
- Date: May 27, 1994
- Venue: MGM Grand Garden Arena, Paradise, Nevada, U.S.
- Title(s) on the line: WBO Junior Lightweight title

Tale of the tape
| Boxer | Oscar De La Hoya | Giorgio Campanella |
| Nickname | The Golden Boy | |
| Hometown | East Los Angeles, California, U.S. | Crotone, Crotone, Italy |
| Pre-fight record | 12–0 (11 KO) | 20–0 (14 KO) |
| Age | 21 years, 3 months | 24 years, 3 months |
| Height | 5 ft 11 in (180 cm) | 5 ft 7 1/2 in (171 cm) |
| Weight | 130 lb (59 kg) | 130 lb (59 kg) |
| Style | Orthodox | Orthodox |
| Recognition | WBA; No. 4 Ranked Junior Lightweight; IBF; No. 6 Ranked Junior Lightweight; The Ring; No. 7 Ranked Junior Lightweight; WBO; Junior Lightweight champion | WBO; No. 1 Ranked Junior Lightweight |

Result
- De La Hoya wins via 3rd-round technical knockout

Oscar De La Hoya vs. Giorgio Campanella was a professional boxing match contested on May 27, 1994, for the WBO junior lightweight title. The fight was the featured bout on the Top Rank–produced boxing card Rising Stars.

== Background ==
Just over two months after winning his first world title, reigning WBO junior lightweight champion Oscar De Le Hoya was set to make his first defense of the title against the WBO's number-one ranked junior lightweight contender, undefeated Giorgio Campanella. The fight was expected to be the only defense of his title and his final fight in the junior lightweight/super featherweight division, as his next fight was scheduled to be against Jorge Páez for Páez's WBO lightweight title two months later on July 29.

The De La Hoya–Campanella fight was the main event of a fight card produced by Top Rank dubbed Rising Stars which also featured IBF middleweight champion Roy Jones Jr. defending his title against Thomas Tate and IBF lightweight champion Rafael Ruelas defending his title against Mike Evgen. Jones was reportedly "furious" upon learning that the De La Hoya–Campanella would headline the event rather than his fight with Tate.

== The fights ==
=== Jones Jr vs. Tate ===
The penultimate bout on the card saw Roy Jones Jr. (The Ring:1st, P4P:8th)make the first defence of his IBF middleweight belt against No. 1 contender Thomas Tate.

==== The fight ====
After outlanding Tate in the 1st round, Jones would land a left hook to the chin of early in the 2nd round sending the challenger down. Tate was able to beat the count, but he appeared wobbly prompting his trainer, Eddie Mustafa Muhammad, to throw in the towel.

| Preceded by vs. Danny Garcia | Roy Jones Jr.'s bouts 27 May 1994 | Succeeded by vs. James Toney |
| Preceded by vs. Rolando Torres | Thomas Tate's bouts 27 May 1994 | Succeeded by vs. Joseph Kiwanuka |

=== Main Event ===
Campanella sent De La Hoya down to the canvas in the opening seconds of the first round with a big left hook to the head. Though he lost the round 10–8 result, De La Hoya withstood an aggressive Campanella and survived the round without further incident. De La Hoya would rebound in the second round, constantly landing jabs and combinations to Campanella's head as the shorter Campanella struggled to land any sustained offense. After dominating Campanella throughout the round, De La Hoya would send him down to his knees with just under 30 seconds remaining after landing a combination. Clearly dazed from the exchange, Campanella tried to keep his distance from De La Hoya, who landed a barrage that sent Campanella down into the ropes just as the bell sounded. Campanella would come back out for the third round, but was on wobbly legs as De La Hoya quickly sent him down again with another combination. Campanella was able to get back up but was quickly sent down again, resulting in his corner throwing in a white towel to signify surrender. Referee Joe Cortez then stopped the fight, giving De La Hoya the victory by technical knockout.

== Fight card ==
Confirmed bouts:

| Weight Class | Weight | | vs. | | Method | Round | Notes |
|---|---|---|---|---|---|---|---|
| Junior Lightweight | 130 lbs. | Oscar De La Hoya (c) | def. | Giorgio Campanella | TKO | 3/12 | ^{note 1} |
| Middleweight | 160 lbs. | Roy Jones Jr. (c) | def. | Thomas Tate | TKO | 2/12 | ^{note 2} |
| Super Welterweight | 154 lbs. | Rafael Ruelas (c) | def. | Mike Evgen | TKO | 3/12 | ^{note 3} |
| Flyweight | 112 lbs. | Danny Romero (c) | def. | Hugo Torres | KO | 6/12 | ^{note 4} |
| Super Featherweight | 130 lbs. | Derrick Gainer | def. | Marcelo Rodriguez | UD | 8/8 |

^Note 1 For WBO Junior Lightweight title
^Note 2 For IBF Middleweight title
^Note 3 For IBF Lightweight title
^Note 4 For NABF Flyweight title

| Preceded by vs. Jimmi Bredahl | Oscar De La Hoya's bouts 27 May 1994 | Succeeded by vs. Jorge Páez |
| Preceded by vs. Paziente Adobati | Giorgio Campanella's bouts 27 May 1994 | Succeeded by vs. Boris Sinitsin |
