= Oscar De La Hoya vs. John John Molina =

Boxing match

Ready or Not
- Date: February 18, 1995
- Venue: MGM Grand Garden Arena, Paradise, Nevada, U.S.
- Title(s) on the line: WBO Lightweight title

Tale of the tape
Boxer	Oscar De La Hoya	Juan Molina
Nickname	The Golden Boy	John John
Hometown	East Los Angeles, California, U.S.	Fajardo, Puerto Rico
Purse	$1,250,000	$300,000
Pre-fight record	16–0 (15 KO)	36–3 (26 KO)
Age	22 years	31 years, 11 months
Height	5 ft 11 in (180 cm)	5 ft 7 in (170 cm)
Weight	135 lb (61 kg)	134 lb (61 kg)
Style	Orthodox	Orthodox
Recognition	WBO; Lightweight champion The Ring; No. 4 Ranked Lightweight	IBF; Super Featherweight champion The Ring; No. 1 Ranked Super Featherweight; 2-time Super Featherweight champion

Result
- De La Hoya wins via unanimous decision (117–110, 116–111, 116–111)

Oscar De La Hoya vs. John John Molina, billed as Ready or Not, was a professional boxing match contested on February 18, 1995, for the WBO lightweight title.

== Background ==
For the first defense of his WBO lightweight title, reigning champion Oscar De La Hoya was matched up against 2-time super featherweight world champion, Juan "John John" Molina.

After having faced three consecutive marginal fringe contenders in his previous three title defenses, Molina represented a step up in competition for De La Hoya with Molina offering his opinion that cable network HBO, who exclusively broadcast De La Hoya's fights had "pressured Oscar to get an opponent with a name and a record." However, as Molina, a natural super featherweight who had spent his entire career in that division up to that point, was making his debut in the lightweight division, De La Hoya claimed that his fight with Molina "is going to be one of my easiest fights."

== The fights ==
=== Toney vs. Griffin ===
Ready or Not: James Toney vs. Montell Griffin
- Title(s) on the line: vacant IBF Inter-Continental Light heavyweight title

Tale of the tape
Boxer	James Toney	Montell Griffin
Nickname	Lights Out	Ice
Hometown	Grand Rapids, Michigan, U.S.	Chicago, Illinois, U.S.
Pre-fight record	44–1–2 (29 KO)	14–0 (8 KO)
Age	26 years, 5 months	24 years, 8 months
Height	5 ft 9 in (175 cm)	5 ft 7 in (170 cm)
Weight	175 lb (79 kg)	173 1/2 lb (79 kg)
Style	Orthodox	Orthodox
Recognition	IBF; No. 3 Ranked Light Heavyweight; The Ring; No. 4 Ranked Light Heavyweight; 2-division world champion	WBC; No. 9 Ranked Light Heavyweight; IBF; No. 10 Ranked Light Heavyweight

Result
- Griffin defeats Toney by majority decision (116–112, 115–113, 114–114)

The featured undercard bout featured James Toney, in his first fight since suffering his first professional loss at the hands of Roy Jones Jr., taking on undefeated light heavyweight prospect (and De La Hoya's 1992 Olympic teammate) Montell Griffin.

This was the third and final card in under a year to feature both De La Hoya and Toney as the headliners.

==== The fight ====
Griffin made use of his left hook and good movement to keep his Toney off balance and prevent him from land any counterpunches. Toney hurt Griffin with a counter right cross in the third round but he survived and kept up sticking close to Toney and tying him up in the corner.

The fight went the full 12 rounds, judge Duane Ford scored it even 114–114 while Bill Graham had it 115–113 and Art Lurie 116–112 both in favour of Griffin.

Unofficial HBO scorer Harold Lederman scored it 114–112 for Toney.

==== Aftermath ====
Speaking afterwards Griffin said "When he had me hurt, the way I survived is, I’m a low-keyed person, I stayed back until I got my legs back. Toney needs punching room. And I took that punching room away from him."

Toney meanwhile was unhappy with the judges saying "I thought I won the fight, it was a bad decision. I’ll be back. I beat the guy."

Preceded by vs. Roy Jones Jr.	James Toney's bouts 18 February 1995	Succeeded by vs. Karl Willis
Preceded by vs. Ray Lathon	Montell Griffin's bouts 18 February 1995	Succeeded by vs. Tony Booth

=== Main Event ===
De La Hoya scored a first-round knockdown midway through the round, countering a wild Molina right with a left hook that sent Molina down to a knee, but was unable to finish Molina off thereafter as Molina was able take De La Hoya the full 12-round distance for the first time in his career. De La Hoya nevertheless controlled the majority of the fight and won a comfortable unanimous decision, with two judges scoring the fight 116–111 and the third scoring it 117–110. Unofficial HBO scorer Harold Lederman scored it 114–113 for Molina.

== Aftermath ==
De La Hoya's victory over Molina would officially set up a shot at his first major world title against IBF lightweight champion Rafael Ruelas.

== Fight card ==
Confirmed bouts:

Weight Class	Weight		vs.		Method	Round	Notes
Lightweight	135 lbs.	Oscar De La Hoya (c)	def.	John John Molina	UD	12/12	^{note 1}
Light Heavyweight	175 lbs.	Montell Griffin	def.	James Toney	MD	12/12	^{note 2}
Super Featherweight	130 lbs.	Robert Garcia	def.	Lorenzo Tiznado	RTD	7/10
Super Lightweight	140 lbs.	Daniel Alicea	def.	Roberto Villareal	UD	8/8
Light Heavyweight	175 lbs.	Chris Johnson	def.	Asluddin Umarov	UD	4/4

^Note 1 For WBO Lightweight title
^Note 2 For IBF Inter-Continental Light Heavyweight title

== Broadcasting ==
Country	Broadcaster
United States	HBO

Preceded by vs. John Avila	Oscar De La Hoya's bouts 18 February 1995	Succeeded by vs. Rafael Ruelas
Preceded by vs. Wilson Rodriguez	John John Molina's bouts 18 February 1995	Succeeded by vs. Mark Reels
