= Boxing at the 1986 Central American and Caribbean Games =

Boxing competitions

The Boxing Tournament at the 1986 Central American and Caribbean Games was held in Santiago de los Caballeros, Dominican Republic from June 24 to July 5, 1986.

== Medal winners ==
Event	Gold	Silver	Bronze
Light Flyweight (– 48 kilograms)	Jesús Beltre (DOM)	Rogelio Marcelo (CUB)	Marcelino Bolivar (VEN); Julio Coronell (COL)
Flyweight (– 51 kilograms)	Pedro Orlando Reyes (CUB)	Laureano Ramírez (DOM)	Eduardo López (PAN); José Maria Rosales (VEN)
Bantamweight (– 54 kilograms)	Ricardo Echeverria (CUB)	Alberto Morillo (DOM)	Ramón Guzmán (VEN); Angel Vargas (PUR)
Featherweight (– 57 kilograms)	Julio González (CUB)	José Ramos (DOM)	Wilson Palacios (COL); Omar Catari (VEN)
Lightweight (– 60 kilograms)	Idel Torriente (CUB)	Donald Allison (GUY)	José Pérez (VEN); Fernando Maldonado (PUR)
Light Welterweight (– 63.5 kilograms)	Eduardo Correa (CUB)	Pedro Saíz (DOM)	Mark Kennedy (JAM) unknown
Welterweight (– 67 kilograms)	José Luis Hernandez (CUB)	Joseph Anthony (TRI)	Freddy Morel (DOM); Justo Aguirre (PUR)
Light Middleweight (– 71 kilograms)	Angel Espinosa (CUB)	Melquis Manon (DOM)	Nelson Adams (PUR); Mark Smykle (JAM)
Middleweight (– 75 kilograms)	Julio Quintana (CUB)	Francisco Rosario (DOM)	Marvin Smith (BAH); Carlos Herrera (VEN)
Light Heavyweight (– 81 kilograms)	Orlando Despaigne (CUB)	Raimundo Yant (VEN)	Edy Ruiz (PUR); Wilfred Moses (GUY)
Heavyweight (– 91 kilograms)	Félix Savón (CUB)	Rodolfo Marín (PUR)	José Acosta (VEN); Virgilio Frias (DOM)
Super Heavyweight (+ 91 kilograms)	Jorge Luis Gonzalez (CUB)	Francisco García (DOM)	Nelson Rosas (PUR) unknown

== Medal table ==
* Host nation (Dominican Republic)

1986 Central American and Caribbean Games Boxing Medal Table
Rank	Nation	Gold	Silver	Bronze	Total
1	Cuba (CUB)	11	1	0	12
2	Dominican Republic (DOM)*	1	7	2	10
3	Venezuela (VEN)	0	1	7	8
4	Puerto Rico (PUR)	0	1	6	7
5	Guyana (GUY)	0	1	1	2
6	Trinidad and Tobago (TTO)	0	1	0	1
7	Colombia (COL)	0	0	2	2
7	Jamaica (JAM)	0	0	2	2
9	Bahamas (BAH)	0	0	1	1
9	Panama (PAN)	0	0	1	1
Totals (10 entries)		12	12	22	46

2 bronze medals received by a country or countries are unknown.
