= Oscar De La Hoya vs. John Avila =

The Golden Return
- Date: December 10, 1994
- Venue: Grand Olympic Auditorium, Los Angeles, California, U.S.
- Title(s) on the line: WBO Lightweight title

Tale of the tape
Boxer	Oscar De La Hoya	John Avila
Nickname	The Golden Boy	Electrifying
Hometown	East Los Angeles, California, U.S.	Palmdale, California, U.S.
Purse	$150,000	$30,000
Pre-fight record	15–0 (14 KO)	20–1–1 (11 KO)
Age	21 years, 10 months	21 years, 11 months
Height	5 ft 11 in (180 cm)	5 ft 5 in (165 cm)
Weight	135 lb (61 kg)	135 lb (61 kg)
Style	Orthodox	Orthodox
Recognition	WBO; Lightweight champion The Ring; No. 4 Ranked Lightweight	WBO; No. 6 Ranked Lightweight; WBC; No. 9 Ranked Lightweight

Result
- De La Hoya wins via 9th-round technical knockout

Oscar De La Hoya vs. John Avila, billed as The Golden Return, was a professional boxing match contested on December 10, 1994, for the WBO lightweight title.

== Background ==
After having defeated former 2-time featherweight champion Jorge Páez in July 1994 to win the vacant WBO lightweight title and thus become a 2-division world champion at only 21-years old, Oscar De La Hoya was scheduled to return to his hometown Los Angeles on October 8, to make the first defense of his newly won title at the Grand Olympic Auditorium where he had won his first world title earlier in March earlier in the year. However, after contracting an unspecified virus that left him weak and unable to train for over a week, De La Hoya pulled out of the fight resulting in its temporary postponement. The fight was considered to be moved to the undercard of the James Toney–Roy Jones Jr. super middleweight title fight where De La Hoya was scheduled to make a title defense against a yet-to-be-named opponent on November 18, but Carl Griffith was eventually named De La Hoya's opponent for that date. After De La Hoya easily dispatched Griffith in three rounds to make the first defense of his lightweight title, it was announced that the De La Hoya–Avila fight would be take place on the rescheduled date of December 10, only three weeks after his fight against Griffith.

== The Fight ==
After having dispatched his three previous opponents within three rounds, De La Hoya ran into a game Avila, who took the favored champion to the ninth round. Though De La Hoya dominated the majority of the fight, winning every round on two scorecards and all but one on the third, minus the eighth when he was deducted a point for a low blow, he was unable to finish Avila off until about 2 minutes into the ninth. De La Hoya had raised a welt on the right side of Avila's face near his eye which swelled massively as the fight went on. Then in the ninth, a De La Hoya barrage caused a massive cut on the welt that caused Avila to bleed profusely. Raul Caiz Sr. put a halt to the fight and had Avila checked by the ringside physician who quickly determined that Avila could not continue and stopped the fight, giving De La Hoya the victory by technical knockout.

== Fight card ==
Confirmed bouts:

Weight Class	Weight		vs.		Method	Round	Notes
Lightweight	135 lbs.	Oscar De La Hoya (c)	def.	John Avila	TKO	9/12	^{note 1}
Super Featherweight	130 lbs.	Robert Garcia	def.	Roberto Villareal	TKO	5/10
Cruiserweight	190 lbs.	Przemysław Saleta	def.	George O'Mara	TKO	2/8
Super Lightweight	140 lbs.	Pepe Reilly	def.	Antonio Ojeda	KO	1/8
Super Lightweight	140 lbs.	Jyri Kjäll	def.	Joe Gonzalez	TKO	1/4

^Note 1 For WBO Lightweight title

== Broadcasting ==
Country	Broadcaster
Latin America	ESPN
United Kingdom	Sky Sports
United States	CBS

Preceded by vs. Carl Griffith	Oscar De La Hoya's bouts 10 December 1994	Succeeded by vs. John John Molina
Preceded by vs. Angelo Nunez	John Avila's bouts 10 December 1994	Succeeded by vs. Eugene Lopez
