= Romallis Ellis =

American boxer

Personal information
- Born: December 16, 1965 (age 60) Atlanta, Georgia, U.S.
Medal record
Men's boxing
Representing the United States
Olympic Games
Bronze medal – third place	1988 Seoul	Lightweight

Romallis Ellis (born December 16, 1965) is an American former professional boxer who competed from 1989 to 2001, challenging for the IBF light middleweight title in 1997. As an amateur, he won the lightweight bronze medal at the 1988 Summer Olympics.

== Amateur career ==
- 1988 United States Amateur Lightweight champion
- 1988 Olympic Lightweight Bronze Medalist.

1988 Olympic Results

- Round of 64: received a bye
- Round of 32: Defeated Lee Kang-Su (South Korea) by decision, 5-0
- Round of 16: Defeated Kassim Traoré (Mali) referee stopped contest in second round
- Quarterfinal: Defeated Emil Chuprenski (Bulgaria) by decision, 3-2
- Semifinal: Lost to Andreas Zülow (East Germany) by decision, 0-5 (was awarded bronze medal)

== Professional career ==
Ellis began his professional career in 1989 and later moved up two weight classes. He came up short in his only attempt at a major title—a 1997 loss to IBF Light Middleweight titleholder Raúl Márquez via TKO in the fourth round. However, Ellis did outbox the heavily favored Vince Phillips in a non-title bout and earned a victory by decision. In 1998 Ellis took on Fernando Vargas and was TKO'd in the second round. Ellis lost his next fight, in 2001, and retired with a record of 24-4-1 with 17 knockouts.
