= Kibar =

Kibar is a Turkish name. Notable people with this name include:

- Kibar Khalvashi (born 1963), Georgian businessman
- Kibar Tatar (born 1968), Turkish boxer
- Melih Kibar (1951–2005), Turkish composer
- Osman Kibar (born 1974), Turkish-American billionaire
