= The Grand Rumble =

Boxing match

The Grand Rumble: De La Hoya vs. Páez
- Date: July 29, 1994
- Venue: MGM Grand Garden Arena, Paradise, Nevada, U.S.
- Title(s) on the line: WBO Lightweight title

Tale of the tape
Boxer	Oscar De La Hoya	Jorge Páez
Nickname	The Golden Boy	El Maromero ("The Acrobat")
Hometown	East Los Angeles, California, U.S.	Mexicali, Baja California, Mexico
Purse	$800,000	$175,000
Pre-fight record	13–0 (12 KO)	53–6–4 (35 KO)
Age	21 years, 5 months	28 years, 9 months
Height	5 ft 11 in (180 cm)	5 ft 5 in (165 cm)
Weight	135 lb (61 kg)	134 1/2 lb (61 kg)
Style	Orthodox	Orthodox
Recognition	WBO; Junior Lightweight champion The Ring; No. 7 Ranked Junior Lightweight	WBO; No. 1 Ranked Lightweight; Former featherweight champion

Result
- De La Hoya wins via 2nd-round knockout

The Grand Rumble was a professional boxing card contested at the MGM Grand Garden Arena on July 29, 1994. Produced by Bob Arum's Top Rank and broadcast by HBO as part of their HBO World Championship Boxing program, the event consisted of two world title fights; Oscar De La Hoya vs. Jorge Páez for the WBO junior lightweight title, and James Toney vs. Charles Williams for the IBF super middleweight title.

== Background ==
Having defeated mandatory challenger Giorgio Campanella to retain his WBO junior lightweight title on May 27, 1994, Oscar De La Hoya announced his intentions to vacate the junior lightweight title in order to move up to lightweight to challenge former two-time featherweight champion Jorge Páez for the WBO lightweight tile that had been vacated by Giovanni Parisi earlier in the year.

Páez, a veteran of 63 fights and having won two world titles and subsequently challenged unsuccessfully twice for the lightweight world title, was looked upon as possibly the toughest challenger for the young De La Hoya at the time, though De La Hoya dismissed the flamboyant Páez as "basically a clown, and that’s about it." As De La Hoya and Páez were fighting for a vacant title, and thus neither holding the lightweight title, the WBO held a coin flip to determine who would get the traditional champion's right to enter the ring last. Páez won the flip leaving De La Hoya reportedly "not happy" about having to enter the ring first. The De La Hoya–Páez fight was paired with an IBF super middleweight title fight between champion James Toney and challenger Charles Williams.

== The fights ==
=== De La Hoya vs. Páez ===
During the first round, De La Hoya took a more cautious approach, allowing the unorthodox Páez to become the aggressor. Though neither fighter landed much offense during the round, De La Hoya took the round on all three scorecards after landing a small flurry as the round came to a close. Then, early in the second round as Páez moved in close in order to hit the larger De La Hoya with a jab, De La Hoya caught Páez with a left hand that stunned him and quickly followed up with a multiple-punch combination that ended with a left hook that sent Páez down on his knees and then onto his back. Páez made no attempt to get back up and remained on the canvas for several minutes as referee Richard Steele counted to 10, giving De La Hoya the knockout victory at 39 seconds of the round.

Preceded by vs. Giorgio Campanella	Oscar De La Hoya's bouts 29 July 1994	Succeeded by vs. Carl Griffith
Preceded by vs. Juan Gomez	Jorge Páez's bouts 29 July 1994	Succeeded by vs. Genaro Hernandez

=== Toney vs. Williams ===
The Grand Rumble: Toney vs. Williams
- Title(s) on the line: IBF super middleweight title

Tale of the tape
Boxer	James Toney	Charles Williams
Nickname	Lights Out	Prince
Hometown	Grand Rapids, Michigan, U.S.	Mansfield, Ohio, U.S.
Pre-fight record	43–0–2 (28 KO)	36–5–2 (28 KO)
Age	25 years, 11 months	32 years, 1 month
Height	5 ft 8 in (173 cm)	6 ft 2 in (188 cm)
Weight	168 lb (76 kg)	167 1/2 lb (76 kg)
Style	Orthodox	Orthodox
Recognition	IBF; Super Middleweight Champion; The Ring; No. 1 Ranked Super Middleweight; The Ring No. 2 ranked pound-for-pound fighter 2-division world champion	IBF; No. 1 Ranked Light Heavyweight; The Ring; No. 4 Ranked Light Heavyweight

Result
- Toney defeats Williams by 12th round KO

The main event saw IBF super middleweight champion James Toney make the third defence of his title against No. 1 ranked Light Heavyweight contender Charles Williams.

==== The fight ====
The bout proved to be competitive, with Williams pressing the attack on the slick Toney. Toney was deducted a point in the 8th round for hitting after the bell. By the final round Toney's left eye had completely swelled shut, however he was to outbox Williams and with less than 30 seconds left in the fight landed an overhand right that sent the challenger down. Williams failed to beat the count, giving Toney a KO victory.

At the time of the stoppage Toney was ahead on all three scorecards, with two judges having it 106–102 and the other scoring it 105–103. HBO's unofficial scorer Harold Lederman also had Toney ahead 106–102.

== Aftermath ==
Toney would claim to have been unwell stating that "I was sick today, I had the flu. I won’t be sick against Roy Jones."

The victory for Tony cleared the way for the much anticipated showdown with middleweight champion Roy Jones Jr. in November.

== Fight card ==
Confirmed bouts:

Weight Class	Weight		vs.		Method	Round	Notes
Lightweight	135 lbs.	Oscar De La Hoya	def.	Jorge Páez	KO	2/12	^{note 1}
Super Middleweight	154 lbs.	James Toney (c)	def.	Charles Williams	KO	12/12	^{note 2}
Super Featherweight	130 lbs.	Robert Garcia	def.	Orlando Euceda	RTD	6/8
Heavyweight	200+ lbs.	Derrick Banks	def.	Jonathan Grant	UD	4/4
Super Featherweight	130 lbs.	Johnny Walker	def.	Justo Sanchez	UD	4/4
Heavyweight	200+ lbs.	Arthur Saribekian	def.	Robert Straw	TKO	1/4

^Note 1 For WBO Lightweight title
^Note 2 For IBF Super Middleweight title

== Broadcasting ==
Country	Broadcaster
United States	HBO

Preceded by vs. Vinson Durham	James Toney's bouts 29 July 1994	Succeeded by vs. Roy Jones Jr.
Preceded by vs. Ernest Mateen	Charles Williams's bouts 29 July 1994	Succeeded by vs. Merqui Sosa
