= Auditorio PSF =

Indoor arena in Mexicali, Mexico

Coordinates: 32.653472°N 115.444685°W

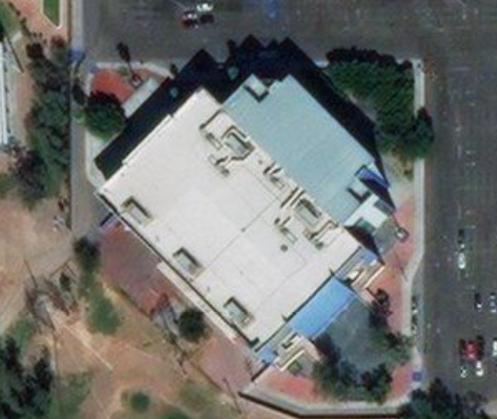
- Interactive map of Auditorio PSF

Auditorio PSF is an indoor arena in Mexicali, Mexico. It is primarily used for basketball and is the home arena of the Soles de Mexicali. It can seat 4,779 people. It is located in the "Ciudad Deportiva" of Mexicali, known as the sport center of the city, where it also holds the Nido de Los Aguilas (baseball stadium), and the Home of the Halcones (American Football).

== History ==
The auditorium was badly damaged in the magnitude 7.2 Baja California earthquake. The auditorium, built in 1985, received international attention as the venue for the final boxing match to have been scheduled for 15 rounds, which took place on August 4, 1988, a match broadcast on USA Tuesday Night Fights. In this fight, Jorge Paez defeated Calvin Grove for the IBF featherweight title.
