= Jean-Paul Bonatou =

Cameroonian boxer (born 1966)

Personal information
- Nationality: Cameroonian
- Born: 15 September 1966 (age 59) Douala, Cameroon

Sport
- Sport: Boxing

Jean-Paul Bonatou (born 15 September 1966) is a Cameroonian boxer. He competed in the men's lightweight event at the 1988 Summer Olympics.
