= Reggie Gross =

American boxer (1962–2025)

Personal information
- Nationality: American
- Born: Reginald Gross; April 4, 1962 Baltimore, Maryland, U.S.
- Died: 16 October 2025 (aged 63)
- Height: 6 ft 4 in (193 cm)
- Weight: Heavyweight

Boxing career
- Reach: 78 in (198 cm)
- Stance: Orthodox

Boxing record
- Total fights: 26
- Wins: 18
- Win by KO: 14
- Losses: 8

Reginald R. Gross (April 4, 1962 - October 16, 2025) was an American former professional boxer who competed from 1982 to 1988. His most notable wins were a first-round knockout of future long-time IBF world Light-Heavyweight champion "Prince" Charles Williams, as well as upsets of undefeated Smokin' Bert Cooper (TKO8) and outstanding amateur and 16-0 pro Jimmy Clark (TKO9).

He was most famously stopped in one round by Mike Tyson, in an exciting but brief bout where he took the fight to the feared contender. He also suffered losses to Frank Bruno and Jesse Ferguson.

His final fight was in June 1988, on the Tyson/Spinks undercard, where he lost to Donovan Ruddock in the second round.

Gross died on 16 October 2025.

== Conviction and imprisonment ==
In 1989, he was arrested and convicted for three contract killings. He was serving his three life sentences with two of them consecutive with the initial part of his sentence served at the maximum security prison in Edgefield, South Carolina.

When interviewed in 2008 Gross was incarcerated at the US Penitentiary, Hazelton and had a 2014 parole hearing planned.

In September 2019, Gross petitioned the US Court of Appeals as he believed that he was eligible for mandatory release after thirty years, as his crimes occurred before the Sentencing Reform Act of 1984 came into effect. The Court found in favor of the Bureau of Prisons, who argued that because he is serving two consecutive life sentences, he would in fact need to serve thirty years on each of his two life sentences before being eligible for mandatory parole.

As of 2023, Gross was incarcerated at MCFP Springfield in Missouri with a release date of November 1, 2048.

== Professional boxing record ==
27 fights	19 wins	8 losses
By knockout	14	5
By decision	5	3

Key to abbreviations used for results
DQ	Disqualification	RTD	Corner retirement
KO	Knockout	SD	Split decision / split draw
MD	Majority decision / majority draw	TD	Technical decision / technical draw
NC	No contest	TKO	Technical knockout
PTS	Points decision	UD	Unanimous decision / unanimous draw

Result	Record	Opponent	Type	Round	Date	Location	Notes
Loss	19-1-1	(Canada) Donovan Ruddock	TKO	2	27/06/1988	(United States) Boardwalk Hall, Atlantic City, New Jersey	Referee stopped the bout at 1:36 of the second round.
Win	16-11	(United States) Harry Terrell	KO	2	06/01/1988	(United States) Baltimore Arena, Baltimore, Maryland	Terrell knocked out at 2:51 of the second round.
Loss	26-2	(Brazil) Adilson Rodrigues	PTS	10	11/10/1987	Araraquara, Brazil	
Loss	30-2	(United Kingdom) Frank Bruno	TKO	8	30/08/1987	Nueva Andalucia Bullring, Marbella, Spain	
Loss	21-0	(United States) Mike Tyson	TKO	1	Jun 13, 1986	(United States) Madison Square Garden, New York City, New York	Referee stopped the bout at 2:36 of the first round.
Loss	8-0	(United States) Henry Tillman	UD	10	04/03/1986	(United States) Resorts Casino Hotel, Atlantic City, New Jersey	
Win	10-0	(United States) Bert Cooper	TKO	8	31/01/1986	(United States) Trump Plaza Hotel and Casino, Atlantic City, New Jersey	Referee stopped the bout at 1:24 of the eighth round.
Win	1-2	(United States) Hector Rodriguez	TKO	3	28/06/1985	(United States) Scranton, Pennsylvania	
Win	16-0	(United States) Jimmy Clark	TKO	9	08/03/1985	(United States) Catholic Youth Center, Scranton, Pennsylvania	Referee stopped the bout at 1:14 of the ninth round.
Loss	8-0	(United States) Jesse Ferguson	TKO	3	20/09/1984	(United States) The Sands, Atlantic City, New Jersey	Referee stopped the bout at 1:49 of the third round.
Win	4-5	(United States) James Reid	PTS	10	06/09/1984	(United States) Baltimore Civic Center, Baltimore, Maryland	
Loss	1-3	(United States) Jack Johnson	PTS	10	23/05/1984	(United States) Pikesville, Maryland	
Loss	8-2	(United States) Anthony Witherspoon	TKO	7	11/04/1984	(United States) Pikesville Armory, Pikesville, Maryland	
Win	10-2	(United States) Marcus Jackson	TKO	3	27/02/1984	(United States) The Sands, Atlantic City, New Jersey	
Win	17-8-1	(United States) Franklin Otts	KO	1	18/08/1983	(United States) Baltimore Civic Center, Baltimore, Maryland	
Win	3-3	(United States) Abdul Hakim	KO	5	27/06/1983	(United States) Ocean City Convention Center, Ocean City, Maryland	
Win	9-2	(United States) Larry Lane	PTS	8	05/05/1983	(United States) Baltimore Civic Center, Baltimore, Maryland	
Win	6-3	(United States) Blufort Spencer	TKO	7	08/04/1983	(United States) Steelworkers Hall, Baltimore, Maryland	
Win	10-2-2	(United States) Charles Williams	TKO	1	01/03/1983	(United States) Baltimore Civic Center, Baltimore, Maryland	
Win	17-25-2	(United States) Fred Brown	KO	2	16/12/1982	(United States) Steelworkers Hall, Baltimore, Maryland	
Win	5-1	(United States) Ric Lainhart	TKO	6	23/09/1982	(United States) Steelworkers Hall, Baltimore, Maryland	
Win	1-3-1	(United States) Charles Price	PTS	6	09/07/1982	(United States) Baltimore Civic Center, Baltimore, Maryland	
Win	1-3	(United States) Sonny Crooms	KO	2	24/06/1982	(United States) Resorts Casino Hotel, Atlantic City, New Jersey	
Win	2-0	(United States) Michael Statton	PTS	4	17/05/1982	(United States) Hilton Hotel, Baltimore, Maryland	
Win	1-3	(United States) John Green	KO	1	24/04/1982	(United States) Richmond, Virginia	
Win	3-11	(United States) Charles Roye	PTS	4	23/01/1982	(United States) Richmond, Virginia	
Win	1-1	(United States) Blufort Spencer	KO	1	07/01/1982	(United States) Steelworkers Hall, Baltimore, Maryland	
