= James Toney vs. Roy Jones Jr. =

1994 boxing match in Nevada, US

The Uncivil War
- Date: November 18, 1994
- Venue: MGM Grand Garden Arena, Paradise, Nevada
- Title(s) on the line: IBF super middleweight title

Tale of the tape
Boxer	James Toney	Roy Jones Jr.
Nickname	Lights Out	Junior
Hometown	Grand Rapids, Michigan	Pensacola, Florida
Purse	$2,500,000	$2,000,000
Pre-fight record	44–0–2 (29 KO)	26–0 (23 KO)
Age	26 years, 2 months	25 years, 10 months
Height	5 ft 9 in (175 cm)	5 ft 11 in (180 cm)
Weight	167 lb (76 kg)	168 lb (76 kg)
Style	Orthodox	Orthodox
Recognition	IBF; Super Middleweight Champion; The Ring; No. 1 Ranked Super Middleweight; The Ring No. 2 ranked pound-for-pound fighter 2-division world champion	IBF; No. 2 Ranked Super Middleweight; The Ring; No. 1 Ranked Middleweight; The Ring No. 7 ranked pound-for-pound fighter Former middleweight champion

Result
- Jones Jr. wins via 12 round unanimous decision (119–108, 117–110, 118–109)

James Toney vs. Roy Jones Jr., billed as The Uncivil War, was a professional boxing match held on November 18, 1994, for the IBF super middleweight championship.

== Background ==
In September 1994, promoter Bob Arum officially announced the highly anticipated title fight between undefeated fighters James Toney and Roy Jones Jr. Toney came into the fight as the IBF super middleweight champion, having won the title on February 13, 1993, from Iran Barkley and having since successfully defended the title three times. Jones, the reigning IBF middleweight champion since defeating Bernard Hopkins on May 22, 1993, had defended the middleweight belt only once before vacating the title in order to move up to the super middleweight division and challenge Toney.

The men were considered to be two of the top fighters in the sport. Toney was ranked number two in the pound-for-pound rankings, while Jones was number seven. Only then-WBC welterweight champion Pernell Whitaker was ranked ahead of Toney.

== The fights ==
=== De La Hoya vs. Griffith ===
In the chief support, 1992 Olympics gold medallist Oscar De La Hoya (The Ring:5th) would make the 1st defence of his lightly regarded WBO lightweight belt against Carl Griffith (WBA: 3rd).

De La Hoya would drop Griffith twice en route to a 3rd round TKO victory.

Preceded by vs. Jorge Páez	Oscar De La Hoya's bouts 18 November 1994	Succeeded by vs. John Avila
Preceded by vs. Anthony Boyle	Carl Griffith's bouts 18 November 1994	Succeeded by vs. Robert Turner

=== Main Event ===
Jones struggled to come down from his initial weight of 180 to the required weight of 168 as mentioned in a 1994 interview by the news company "The Hour" stating "I came from 180 to 168 and it was tough," Jones said. However, despite his weight struggles, Jones dominated nearly the entire fight and won a unanimous decision.

Only one official knockdown occurred during the fight, a left hook from Jones which sent Toney stumbling back into a corner. He nearly fell down, though he was able to keep his balance with the help of the ropes and remained on his feet. Nevertheless, referee Richard Steele ruled it a knockdown, and Toney was forced to take a standing eight count. Steele's reasoning for this decision is because any punch that knocks down a fighter that makes the fighter use the need to hang on the ropes to prevent himself from touching the canvas is sufficient evidence to score that punch as a knockdown punch. It was only the second time that Toney had been knocked down. In his previous 46 fights, only Reggie Johnson had scored a knockdown over Toney. After the knockdown, Jones would continue to dictate the pace of the fight, constantly using his speed to land combinations and avoid Toney's offense.

When the fight ended and went to the judges' scorecards, all three had different scores, all with Jones ahead. Jones won the unanimous decision victory with scores of 119–108, 118–109, and 117–110.

== Aftermath ==
Ring magazine would call Jones' performance the most dominant of any big fight in 20 years. Jones landed 285 of 614 punches (46%) and Toney connected on 157 of 451 (35%). The fight generated 300,000 pay-per-view buys.

== Undercard ==
Confirmed bouts:

Winner	Loser	Weight division/title belt(s) disputed	Result
(United States) Oscar De La Hoya	(United States) Carl Griffith	WBO World Lightweight title	3rd round TKO
(United States) Danny Romero	(Dominican Republic) Domingo Sosa	NABF Super Flyweight title	1st round TKO
(United States) Robert Garcia	(United States) Derrick Gainer	Super featherweight (10 rounds)	Unanimous decision
Preliminary bouts
(Cuba) Jorge Luis Gonzalez	(Samoa) Tui Toia	Heavyweight (10 rounds)	2nd round TKO
(Jamaica) Chris Johnson	(United States) Roman Santos	Super middleweight (6 rounds)	Unanimous decision
(United States) Manny Castillo	(United States) Keith Lee	Welterweight (4 rounds)	Split decision

== Broadcasting ==
Country	Broadcaster
United States	HBO

Preceded by vs. Charles Williams	James Toney's bouts 18 November 1994	Succeeded by vs. Montell Griffin
Preceded by vs. Thomas Tate	Roy Jones Jr.'s bouts 18 November 1994	Succeeded by vs. Antoine Byrd
