= Sean Knight =

Barbadian boxer (born 1969)

Personal information
- Nationality: Barbadian
- Born: 10 July 1969 (age 57)

Sport
- Sport: Boxing

Sean Knight (born 10 July 1969) is a Barbadian boxer. He competed in the men's lightweight event at the 1988 Summer Olympics.
