= István Turu =

Hungarian boxer (1962–2021)

Personal information
- Nationality: Hungarian
- Born: 25 September 1962; Törökszentmiklós, Hungary
- Died: 15 February 2021 (aged 58); Hungary

Sport
- Sport: Boxing

István Turu (25 September 1962 – 15 February 2021) was a Hungarian boxer. He competed in the men's lightweight event at the 1988 Summer Olympics.

Turu died from COVID-19 during the pandemic in Hungary.
