= Eduardo de la Peña (boxer) =

Guamanian boxer (born 1967)

Personal information
- Nationality: Guamanian
- Born: 7 December 1967 (age 57)

Sport
- Sport: Boxing

Eduardo de la Peña (born 21 July 1967) is a boxer who represented Guam. He competed in the men's lightweight event at the 1988 Summer Olympics.
