= José Pérez (Venezuelan boxer) =

Venezuelan boxer (born 1964)

José Pérez (born January 10, 1964) is a former Venezuelan boxer. At the 1988 Summer Olympics he lost in the second round of the men's lightweight division (– 60 kg) to Mongalia's eventual bronze medalist Nergüin Enkhbat. Pérez won a bronze medal at the 1986 Central American and Caribbean Games and a silver medal at the 1987 Pan American Games in the lightweight category.
