= George Scott (boxer) =

Swedish boxer

Personal information
- Full name: George Kelly Scott
- Nationality: Sweden
- Born: George Kelly Cramne; 20 December 1966 (age 59) Monrovia, Liberia

Sport
- Sport: Boxing
- Weight class: Lightweight
- Club: BK Rapid (-1986); IF Linnéa (1987–1990); Djurgårdens IF (1991)
Medal record
Olympic Games
Silver medal – second place	1988 Seoul	Lightweight
Swedish Boxing Championship
Gold medal – first place	1986	Featherweight
Gold medal – first place	1987	Lightweight
Gold medal – first place	1988	Lightweight
Gold medal – first place	1990	Lightweight
Gold medal – first place	1991	Lightweight
Nordic Boxing Championship
Gold medal – first place	1986	Featherweight
Gold medal – first place	1990	Lightweight

George Kelly Scott (born 20 December 1966), earlier George Cramne, is a Liberian-born Swedish retired professional boxer. He won the Swedish championship five years in a row, took a silver medal in the Olympic games in Seoul 1988. and won the world champion belt for WBU. He never lost his belt in the ring, but would later have it taken away from him following a disagreement with his manager.

== Amateur career ==
He competed at the 1988 Summer Olympics in Seoul, South Korea, where he won the silver medal in the lightweight (– 60 kg) division. He also won five Swedish Championships before becoming a pro in the United States in 1991.

== 1988 Olympic results ==
- Round of 32: Defeated John Elson Mkangala (Malawi) by decision, 5–0
- Round of 16: Defeated Michael Carruth (Ireland) by first-round knockout
- Quarterfinal: Defeated Charlie Kane (Great Britain) by decision, 5–0
- Semifinal: Defeated Nergüin Enkhbat (Mongolia) by decision, 3–2
- Final: Lost to Andreas Zülow (East Germany) by decision, 0-5 (was awarded silver medal)

== Pro boxing career ==
In 1995 he won the WBU World Champion title, which he kept until 1997.

== Kickboxing career ==
Scott lost his first fight in 2005 by unanimous decision. He came back to win his second fight by split decision against former 1988 Olympic boxing bronze medalist Lars Myrberg at the K-1 Rumble of the Kings 2009 in Stockholm.

== Professional boxing record ==
46 fights	41 wins	5 losses
By knockout	17	1
By decision	24	4
Draws	0	
No contests	0	

No.	Result	Record	Opponent	Type	Round, time	Date	Location	Notes
46	Loss	41–5	(Italy) Gianluca Branco	TD	6 (12)	2001-11-17	Civitavecchia, Lazio, Italy	For EBU European Super lightweight title. Bout stopped early in round 6 after Scott was cut from a headbutt.
45	Loss	41–4	(Denmark) Allan Vester	MD	12	2001-02-23	Aarhus Stadionhal, Aarhus, Denmark	For IBF Inter-Continental Super lightweight title. IBF Super lightweight title eliminator.
44	Win	41–3	(United States) Fred Ladd	UD	6	2000-12-01	Viborg Stadionhal, Viborg, Denmark	
43	Win	40–3	(United Kingdom) Alan Bosworth	UD	8	2000-04-28	K.B. Hallen, Copenhagen, Denmark	
42	Win	39–3	(Italy) Gianni Gelli	UD	8	2000-03-31	Esbjerg Stadionhal, Esbjerg, Denmark	
41	Win	38–3	(Jamaica) Delroy Mellis	PTS	6	1999-11-29	(United Kingdom) Wembley Arena, Wembley, London, England	
40	Win	37–3	(United Kingdom) John T Kelly	TKO	8 (8), 1:42	1999-05-08	(United Kingdom) York Hall, Bethnal Green, London, England	
39	Win	36–3	(United Kingdom) Karl Taylor	TKO	4 (6), 0:27	1999-03-06	(United Kingdom) Elephant & Castle Centre, Southwark, London, England	
38	Win	35–3	(United Kingdom) Rudi Valentino	TKO	6 (6), 2:38	1998-12-12	(United Kingdom) Northgate Arena, Chester, England	
37	Win	34–3	(Lithuania) Rimvydas Bilius	PTS	8	1998-09-12	(United Kingdom) York Hall, Bethnal Green, London, England	
36	Win	33–3	(Mexico) Julio Ibarra	TKO	3 (8), 1:14	1998-08-15	(United States) Civic Center, Gallatin, Tennessee, USA	
35	Loss	32–3	(Italy) Gianni Gelli	SD	10	1998-05-29	Pesaro, Italy	
34	Loss	32–2	(United States) Stevie Johnston	UD	12	1998-02-28	(United States) Ballys Park Place Hotel Casino, Atlantic City, New Jersey, USA	For WBC Lightweight title.
33	Win	32–1	(United Kingdom) Mark Ramsey	PTS	10	1997-08-09	San Gennaro Vesuviano, Naples, Italy	
32	Win	31–1	(Hungary) Zoltan Kalocsai	UD	12	1997-02-15	Kurhalle Oberlaa, Vienna, Austria	Retained WBU Lightweight title.
31	Win	30–1	(South Africa) Naas Scheepers	MD	12	1996-11-05	Carousel Casino, Hammanskraal, South Africa	Retained WBU Lightweight title.
30	Win	29–1	(United States) Pete Taliaferro	UD	12	1996-06-07	(United States) Caesars Palace, Las Vegas, Nevada, USA	Retained WBU Lightweight title.
29	Win	28–1	(United States) Shane Gannon	KO	1 (12), 1:59	1996-02-09	(United States) Caesars Palace, Las Vegas, Nevada, USA	Retained WBU Lightweight title.
28	Win	27–1	(United States) Rafael Ruelas	UD	12	1995-10-07	(The Bahamas) Nassau, Bahamas	Won WBU Lightweight title.
27	Win	26–1	(Mexico) Macario Davila	RTD	4 (10), 3:00	1995-06-18	(United States) Performing Arts Theater, New Orleans, Louisiana, USA	
26	Win	25–1	(United States) Jose Miguel Fernandez	UD	10	1995-01-28	(United States) Ballys Park Place Hotel Casino, Atlantic City, New Jersey, USA	
25	Win	24–1	(Mexico) Antonio Ojeda	UD	8	1994-11-05	(United States) Caesars Tahoe, Stateline, Nevada, USA	
24	Loss	23–1	(Puerto Rico) Jake Rodríguez	TKO	9 (12)	1994-08-27	(United States) Fernwood Resort, Bushkill, Pennsylvania, USA	For IBF Super lightweight title.
23	Win	23–0	(United States) Mike Powell	UD	8	1994-04-22	(United States) Caesars Palace, Las Vegas, Nevada, USA	
22	Win	22–0	(United States) Homer Gibbins	MD	12	1994-02-17	(United States) Hyatt Regency Atlanta, Atlanta, Georgia, USA	Won WBC Continental Americas Super lightweight title.
21	Win	21–0	(United States) Robert Rivera	UD	10	1993-12-03	(United States) The Venue at UCF, Orlando, Florida, USA	
20	Win	20–0	(United States) Chauncey Johnson	UD	10	1993-10-22	(United States) The Venue at UCF, Orlando, Florida, USA	
19	Win	19–0	(United States) Antonio Carter	KO	5 (?)	1993-09-24	(United States) Gulf Shores, Alabama, USA	
18	Win	18–0	(Guyana) Donald Allison	UD	10	1993-07-24	(United States) Showboat Atlantic City, Atlantic City, New Jersey, USA	
17	Win	17–0	(United States) John Stewart	UD	8	1993-05-22	(United States) RFK Stadium, Washington, D.C., USA	
16	Win	16–0	(United States) Darren McGrew	PTS	8	1993-04-30	(United States) Orange Beach, Alabama, USA	
15	Win	15–0	(Barbados) Ed Pollard	KO	4 (?)	1993-04-03	(United States) Jai Alai Fronton, Miami, Florida, USA	
14	Win	14–0	(Mexico) Martin Galvan	TKO	2 (?), 1:40	1993-02-26	(United States) Coliseum, Saint Petersburg, Florida, USA	
13	Win	13–0	(United States) Mike Powell	UD	8	1993-01-15	(United States) Scottsdale, Arizona, USA	
12	Win	12–0	(United Kingdom) Wayne Shepherd	TKO	6 (8), 1:46	1992-10-31	(United Kingdom) Earls Court Exhibition Hall, Kensington, London, England	
11	Win	11–0	(United States) Russell Mosley	TKO	5 (8), 2:45	1992-07-11	(United States) The Aladdin, Paradise, Las Vegas, Nevada, USA	
10	Win	10–0	(United States) Fernando Ruperto	TKO	4 (6)	1992-05-30	(United States) Daytona Beach, Florida, USA	
9	Win	9–0	(United States) Jerry Perez	UD	6	9 May 1992	(United States) The Mirage, Las Vegas, Nevada, USA	
8	Win	8–0	(United States) Jeff Schuyler	TKO	4 (6), 1:51	1992-03-27	(United States) USF Sun Dome, Tampa, Florida, USA	
7	Win	7–0	(United States) Aaron Shockley	KO	1 (6), 2:59	1992-02-20	(United States) Horizon Arena, Rosemont, Illinois, USA	
6	Win	6–0	(United Kingdom) John Smith	KO	3 (4), 0:34	1992-02-01	(United Kingdom) National Exhibition Centre, Birmingham, England	
5	Win	5–0	(Antigua and Barbuda) George Kellman	PTS	4	1991-12-15	(United States) Miami, Florida, USA	
4	Win	4–0	(United States) John Jones	UD	4	18 Oct 1991	(United States) Convention Center, Atlantic City, New Jersey, USA	
3	Win	3–0	(United Kingdom) Wayne Windle	KO	2 (4)	1991-09-21	(United Kingdom) White Hart Lane, Tottenham, London, England	
2	Win	2–0	(United States) Steve Frederick	UD	4	1991-08-16	(United States) Charleston, South Carolina, USA	
1	Win	1–0	(Mexico) Armando Gonzalez	KO	1 (4), 0:28	1991-07-29	(United States) Convention Center, Miami Beach, Florida, USA	Professional debut.

== Kickboxing record ==
Professional record breakdown
2 matches	1 win	1 loss
By knockout	0	0
By decision	1	1
By disqualification	0	0

Result	Record	Opponent	Method	Event	Date	Round	Time	Location	Notes
Win	1-1	(Sweden) Lars Myrberg	Decision (Split)	K-1 Rumble of the Kings 2009 in Stockholm	20 November 2009	3	3:00	Stockholm, Sweden	
Loss	0–1	(Sweden) Zoltan Sarossy	Decision (Unanimous)	K-1 Scandinavia Grand Prix 2005	21 May 2005	3	3:00	Stockholm, Sweden	
