= Blessing Onoko =

Nigerian boxer

Personal information
- Nationality: Nigerian
- Born: 15 December 1969 (age 55)

Sport
- Sport: Boxing

Blessing Onoko (born 15 December 1969) is a Nigerian boxer. He competed in the men's lightweight event at the 1988 Summer Olympics.
