= Héctor Arroyo =

Puerto Rican boxer

Personal information
- Full name: Héctor A. Arroyo Rodríguez
- Nationality: Puerto Rican
- Born: 30 May 1966 (age 60) Morovis, Puerto Rico

Sport
- Sport: Boxing

Héctor A. Arroyo Rodríguez (born 30 May 1966) is a Puerto Rican boxer. He competed in the men's lightweight event at the 1988 Summer Olympics.
