= Daniel Freitas (boxer) =

Uruguayan boxer

Personal information
- Born: 22 November 1965 (age 60) Montevideo, Uruguay

Sport
- Sport: Boxing

Daniel Freitas (born 22 November 1965) is a Uruguayan boxer. He competed in the men's lightweight event at the 1988 Summer Olympics. At the 1988 Summer Olympics, he lost to Giorgio Campanella of Italy.
