= Charles Williams (boxer) =

American boxer (born 1962)

Charles Williams (born June 2, 1962) is an American former professional boxer who competed from 1978 to 1996, holding the IBF light heavyweight title from 1987 to 1993.

== Career ==
Born in Columbus, Ohio, Williams was known as "Prince" Charles and turned pro in 1978. He lost his pro debut against former Olympic boxer Henry Bunch. However, in 1987 he captured the IBF light heavyweight title by stopping Bobby Czyz in Las Vegas. He defended the title against eight boxers before losing the title to Henry Maske in 1993. In 1994 he moved down to Super Middleweight to take on IBF super middleweight title holder James Toney, but he was KO'd in the 12th round. He retired in 1996.

== Professional boxing record ==
47 fights	37 wins	7 losses
By knockout	28	4
By decision	9	3
Draws	3	

No.	Result	Record	Opponent	Type	Round, time	Date	Location	Notes
47	Win	37–7–3	Chris Vernon	KO	2 (8)	Mar 24, 1996	Salle Leyrit, Nice, France	
46	Loss	36–7–3	Merqui Sosa	KO	7 (12), 2:12	Jun 30, 1995	PA Convention Center, Philadelphia, Pennsylvania, US	For vacant NABF light heavyweight title
45	Draw	36–6–3	Merqui Sosa	TD	7 (12)	Jan 13, 1995	Ballys Park Place Hotel Casino, Atlantic City, New Jersey, US	For vacant NABF light heavyweight title
44	Loss	36–6–2	James Toney	KO	12 (12), 2:45	Jul 29, 1994	MGM Grand, Las Vegas, Nevada, US	For IBF super middleweight title
43	Win	36–5–2	Ernest Mateen	TKO	10 (12), 1:11	Apr 7, 1994	Southern Belle Casino, Robinsonville, Mississippi, US	Won vacant WBC Continental Americas light heavyweight title
42	Win	35–5–2	Booker T. Word	RTD	2 (10), 3:00	Oct 13, 1993	The Roxy, Boston, Massachusetts, US	
41	Win	34–5–2	Art Bayliss	TKO	7 (10), 1:21	Jun 20, 1993	Fernwood Resort, Bushkill, Pennsylvania, US	
40	Loss	33–5–2	Henry Maske	UD	12	Mar 20, 1993	Philips Halle, Düsseldorf, Nordrhein-Westfalen, Germany	Lost IBF light heavyweight title
39	Win	33–4–2	Freddie Delgado	TKO	2 (12), 2:24	Oct 19, 1991	Williamson Field House, Williamson, West Virginia, US	Retained IBF light heavyweight title
38	Win	32–4–2	Vincent Boulware	KO	3 (12), 2:49	Jul 20, 1991	Teatro Ariston, San Remo, Italy	Retained IBF light heavyweight title
37	Win	31–4–2	James Kinchen	TKO	2 (12), 0:23	Apr 20, 1991	Caesars Hotel & Casino, Atlantic City, New Jersey, US	Retained IBF light heavyweight title
36	Win	30–4–2	Mwehu Beya	UD	12	Jan 12, 1991	Palasport, Saint-Vincent, Italy	Retained IBF light heavyweight title
35	Win	29–4–2	Bert Gravley	KO	3 (10), 0:27	Aug 21, 1990	The Palace, Auburn Hills, Michigan, US	
34	Win	28–4–2	Frankie Swindell	RTD	8 (12), 3:00	Jan 7, 1990	Tropicana Hotel & Casino, Atlantic City, New Jersey, US	Retained IBF light heavyweight title
33	Win	27–4–2	Bobby Czyz	RTD	10 (12), 3:00	Jun 25, 1989	Convention Center, Atlantic City, New Jersey, US	Retained IBF light heavyweight title
32	Win	26–4–2	Johnny Davis	KO	5 (10), 1:25	Apr 7, 1989	IX Center, Cleveland, Ohio, US	
31	Win	25–4–2	Rufino Angulo	KO	3 (12), 2:21	Oct 21, 1988	L'Espace d'Ornon, Villenave d'Ornon, Paris	Retained IBF light heavyweight title
30	Win	24–4–2	Richard Caramanolis	TKO	11 (15)	Jun 10, 1988	Parc des Sports, Annecy, Paris	Retained IBF light heavyweight title
29	Win	23–4–2	Jimmy Shavers	KO	5 (?)	Apr 18, 1988	Palais des Sports, Paris	
28	Win	22–4–2	Bobby Czyz	RTD	9 (15), 3:00	Oct 29, 1987	Las Vegas Hilton, Outdoor Arena, Las Vegas, Nevada, US	Won IBF light heavyweight title
27	Win	21–4–2	Joe Golphin	TKO	2 (12), 1:31	Jul 14, 1987	Blue Horizon, Philadelphia, Pennsylvania, US	Retained USBA light heavyweight title
26	Win	20–4–2	James Salerno	MD	12	Sep 20, 1986	Market Square Arena, Indianapolis, Indiana, US	Won vacant USBA light heavyweight title
25	Win	19–4–2	Eric Winbush	SD	10	Aug 19, 1986	Blue Horizon, Philadelphia, Pennsylvania, US	
24	Win	18–4–2	Arthel Lawhorn	TKO	3 (10)	Apr 18, 1986	Sands Casino Hotel, Atlantic City, New Jersey, US	
23	Win	17–4–2	Jeff Lampkin	PTS	10	Dec 3, 1985	Sands Casino Hotel, Atlantic City, New Jersey, US	
22	Win	16–4–2	Mike Fisher	TKO	5 (10), 3:00	Oct 3, 1985	Sands Casino Hotel, Atlantic City, New Jersey, US	
21	Win	15–4–2	Arthur Hall	KO	1 (10), 2:32	Aug 5, 1985	Sands Casino Hotel, Atlantic City, New Jersey, US	
20	Win	14–4–2	Willard Nance	TKO	1 (8), 2:59	Jun 3, 1985	Sands Casino Hotel, Atlantic City, New Jersey, US	
19	Win	13–4–2	Marcus Jackson	UD	6	Mar 2, 1985	Sands Casino Hotel, Atlantic City, New Jersey, US	
18	Loss	12–4–2	Marvin Johnson	UD	10	Nov 8, 1984	Tyndall Armory, Indianapolis, Indiana, US	
17	Win	12–3–2	Clarence Osby	TKO	2 (?), 1:03	Sep 22, 1984	Gerald R. Ford Fieldhouse, Grand Rapids, Michigan, US	
16	Win	11–3–2	Anthony Witherspoon	UD	8	Jun 23, 1983	Civic Center, West Warwick, Rhode Island, US	
15	Loss	10–3–2	Reggie Gross	TKO	1 (8), 0:55	Mar 1, 1983	Civic Center, Baltimore, Maryland, US	
14	Win	10–2–2	Kemper Morton	PTS	4	Dec 15, 1981	Galion, Ohio, US	
13	Win	9–2–2	Al Bolden	TKO	4 (8), 0:52	Dec 12, 1981	Expo Mart, Monroeville, Pennsylvania, US	
12	Loss	8–2–2	Jeff Lampkin	TKO	6 (10), 0:45	Oct 29, 1981	Packard Music Hall, Warren, Ohio, US	For vacant USA Ohio State light heavyweight title
11	Win	8–1–2	Marcellus Ball	KO	2 (6), 0:45	May 28, 1981	Cascade Holiday Inn, Akron, Ohio, US	
10	Win	7–1–2	Eddie Temple	TKO	2 (6)	Apr 13, 1981	Cascade Holiday Inn, Akron, Ohio, US	
9	Draw	6–1–2	Michael Hardin	PTS	6	May 17, 1980	Convention Center, Dayton, Ohio, US	
8	Win	6–1–1	Tim Johnson	KO	1 (6)	May 3, 1980	Memorial Civic Center, Canton, Ohio, US	
7	Win	5–1–1	Sylvester Wilder	TKO	1 (4)	Apr 30, 1980	Field House, Struthers, Ohio, US	
6	Win	4–1–1	Sam Bryant	TKO	1 (?), 2:19	Sep 20, 1979	Richfield Coliseum, Richfield, Ohio, US	
5	Win	3–1–1	Gus Turner	PTS	4	May 19, 1979	Findlay, Ohio, US	
4	Win	2–1–1	Willie Crawford	KO	3 (6), 2:35	Apr 27, 1979	Convention Center, Dayton, Ohio, US	
3	Win	1–1–1	Willie Crawford	PTS	4	Mar 21, 1979	Richfield Coliseum, Richfield, Ohio, US	
2	Draw	0–1–1	Michael Hardin	PTS	4	Feb 7, 1979	Richfield Coliseum, Richfield, Ohio, US	
1	Loss	0–1	Henry Bunch	PTS	4	Jun 28, 1978	DC Armory, Washington, DC, US	

== See also ==
- List of IBF world champions

Regional boxing titles
Vacant Title last held by Marvin Johnson	USBA Light Heavyweight Champion; September 20, 1986 – October 29, 1987; Won IBF title	Vacant Title next held by Frankie Swindell
World boxing titles
Preceded by Bobby Czyz	IBF Light Heavyweight Champion; 29 October 1987 – 20 March 1993	Succeeded by Henry Maske
