= Daniel Freitas (politician) =

Brazilian politician (born 1982)

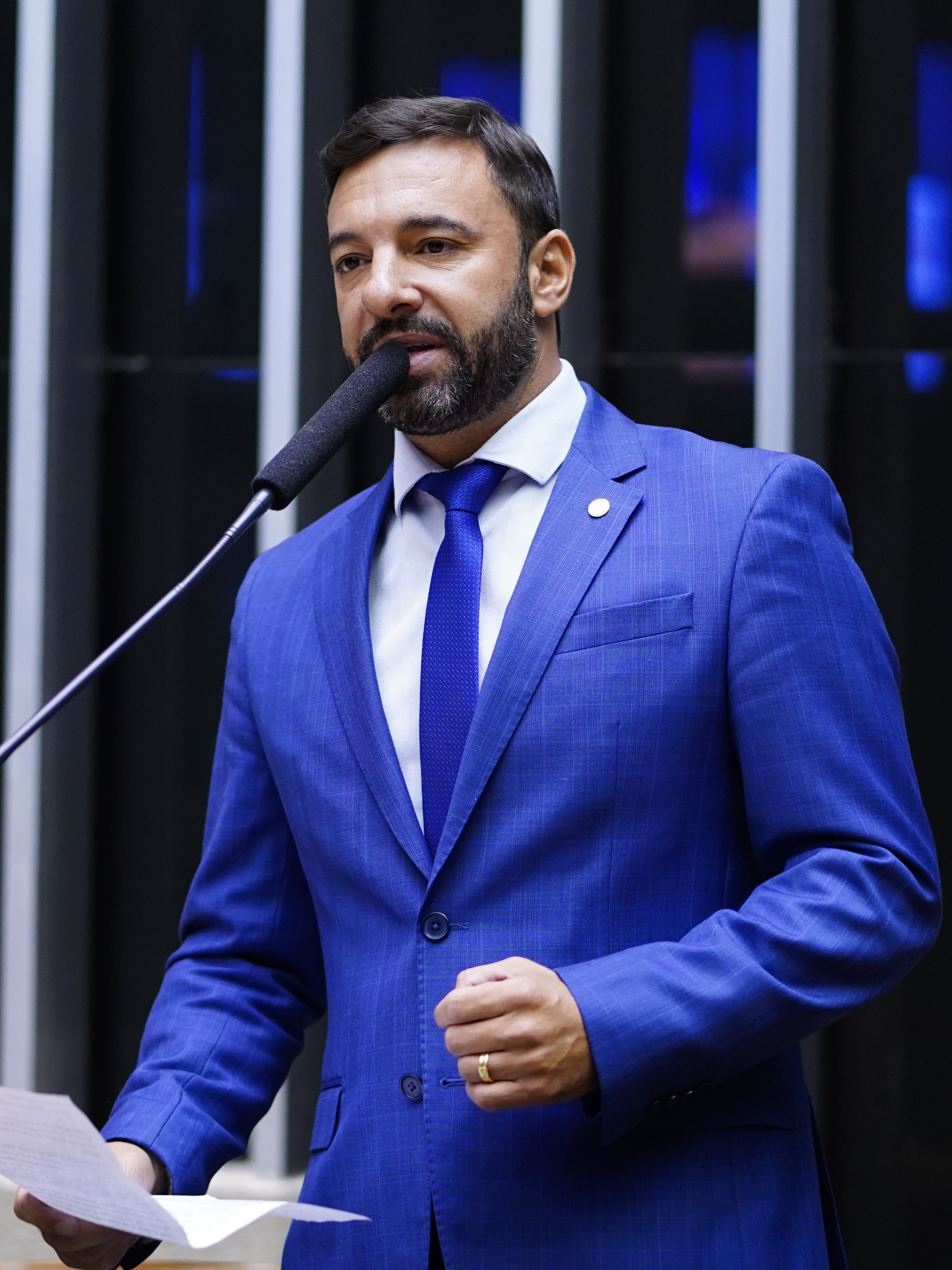
- Freitas in 2023

Member of the Chamber of Deputies
- Incumbent
- Assumed office 1 February 2019
- Constituency: Santa Catarina

Member of the Municipal Chamber of Criciúma
- In office 1 January 2013 – 24 July 2018
- Constituency: At-large

Personal details
- Born: Daniel Costa de Freitas; 3 April 1982 (age 44) Criciúma, Santa Catarina, Brazil
- Party: PL (since 2022)
- Other political affiliations: PP (2011–2018); PSL (2018–2022)

Daniel Costa de Freitas (born 3 April 1982) is a Brazilian politician serving as a member of the Chamber of Deputies since 2019. From 2013 to 2018, he was a municipal councillor of Criciúma.
