= Rafael Ruelas =

Mexican boxer

Personal information
- Nationality: Mexican; American
- Born: 26 April 1971 (age 55) Yerbabuena, Jalisco, Mexico
- Height: 5 ft 11 in (1.80 m)
- Weight: Featherweight; Lightweight; Super lightweight

Boxing career
- Reach: 71 in (180 cm)
- Stance: Orthodox

Boxing record
- Total fights: 57
- Wins: 53
- Win by KO: 41
- Losses: 4

Rafael Ruelas (born 26 April 1971) is a Mexican real estate agent in Granada Hills, California. He was a professional boxer who held the IBF lightweight world championship from 1994 until 1995. Rafael is the younger brother of former WBC super featherweight world champion Gabriel Ruelas. The brothers held their respective world titles concurrently and on January 28, 1995, they became the first pair of brothers to successfully retain their title on the same boxing card.

== Professional career ==
Shortly after a TKO in 10 over Jorge Páez in 1992, Ruelas earned a shot at IBF lightweight titlist Freddie Pendleton, overcoming an early knockdown and winning by unanimous decision.

Ruelas was able to successfully defend his title prior to being challenged by the rapidly rising star Oscar De La Hoya. De la Hoya, despite having lost to Ruelas twice in golden gloves, defeated Ruelas, knocking him down twice and ending the fight in the second round.

Ruelas's career and success were driven by a tenacious, aggressive, and disciplined character. Ruelas retired in 1999 and went on to marry American beauty product business owner, Sabrina Ruelas. The couple have three children together. In an interview, Ruelas was quoted as saying that his wife and family are his biggest accomplishments, surpassing even his championship belts. Ruelas serves as a real estate agent in Granada Hills.

== Professional boxing record ==
57 fights	53 wins	4 losses
By knockout	41	3
By decision	11	1
By disqualification	1	0

No.	Result	Record	Opponent	Type	Round	Date	Location	Notes
57	Win	53–4	Hicklet Lau	SD	10	Aug 8, 1999	New Frontier Hotel, Paradise, Nevada, U.S.	
56	Loss	52–4	Kostya Tszyu	TKO	9 (12)	Aug 15, 1998	County Coliseum, El Paso, Texas, U.S.	
55	Win	52–3	Juan Baldwin	RTD	5 (10)	Jun 19, 1998	Trump Marina Hotel Casino, Atlantic City, New Jersey, U.S.	
54	Win	51–3	Tim Scott	TKO	2 (?)	Mar 21, 1998	Max Schmeling Halle, Prenzlauer Berg, Berlin, Germany	
53	Win	50–3	Rodney Wilson	TKO	7 (10)	Nov 14, 1997	South Padre Island, Texas, U.S.	
52	Win	49–3	Mike Griffith	TKO	2 (10)	Jul 19, 1997	Fantasy Springs Casino, Indio, California, U.S.	
51	Win	48–3	Jesus Arce	TKO	2 (10)	Jan 23, 1997	Country Club, Reseda, California, U.S.	
50	Win	47–3	Jaime Balboa	KO	5 (10)	Dec 3, 1996	Fantasy Springs Casino, Indio, California, U.S.	
49	Win	46–3	Livingstone Bramble	UD	10	Aug 23, 1996	Ballys Park Place Hotel Casino, Atlantic City, New Jersey, U.S.	
48	Win	45–3	Mike Walsh	KO	2 (10)	Jul 10, 1996	Beverly Hilton, Beverly Hills, California, U.S.	
47	Win	44–3	Tomas Barrientes	KO	2 (10)	Apr 30, 1996	San Antonio, Texas, U.S.	
46	Loss	43–3	George Scott	UD	12	Oct 7, 1995	Atlantis Resorts and Casino, Paradise Island, Bahamas	For vacant WBU lightweight title
45	Loss	43–2	Oscar De La Hoya	TKO	2 (12)	May 6, 1995	Caesars Palace, Paradise, Nevada, U.S.	Lost IBF lightweight title; For WBO lightweight title
44	Win	43–1	Billy Schwer	RTD	8 (12)	Jan 28, 1995	MGM Grand, Las Vegas, Nevada, U.S.	Retained IBF lightweight title
43	Win	42–1	Omar Pacheco	KO	3 (10)	Dec 8, 1994	Convention Center, Albuquerque, New Mexico, U.S.	
42	Win	41–1	Mike Evgen	TKO	3 (12)	May 27, 1994	MGM Grand, Grand Garden Arena, Las Vegas, Nevada, U.S.	Retained IBF lightweight title
41	Win	40–1	Freddie Pendleton	UD	12	Feb 19, 1994	Great Western Forum, Inglewood, California, U.S.	Won IBF lightweight title
40	Win	39–1	Manuel Hernandez	KO	1 (8)	Oct 22, 1993	Boise State Pavilion, Boise, Idaho, U.S.	
39	Win	38–1	Conrado Lopez	KO	1 (10)	Aug 19, 1993	Marriott Hotel, Irvine, California, U.S.	
38	Win	37–1	Darryl Tyson	UD	10	Jul 17, 1993	Caesars Palace, Paradise, Nevada, U.S.	
37	Win	36–1	Robert Rivera	TKO	3 (12)	Feb 23, 1993	Country Club, Reseda, California, U.S.	Retained NABF lightweight title; title match despite Rivera being 4lbs overweight
36	Win	35–1	Roberto Burgos	KO	1 (10)	Jan 19, 1993	Boise Center, Boise, Idaho, U.S.	Won vacant NABF lightweight title
35	Win	34–1	Jorge Páez	RTD	10 (12)	Nov 6, 1992	Great Western Forum, Inglewood, California, U.S.	Won vacant NABF lightweight title
34	Win	33–1	Benny Dominguez	KO	1 (10)	Aug 25, 1992	Country Club, Reseda, California, U.S.	
33	Win	32–1	Mauro Gutierrez	UD	10	Jul 7, 1992	Hollywood Palladium, Hollywood, California, U.S.	
32	Win	31–1	Francisco Ortiz	TKO	2 (10)	May 26, 1992	Country Club, Reseda, California, U.S.	
31	Win	30–1	Francisco Lopez	TKO	1 (8)	Apr 3, 1992	Reno-Sparks Convention Center, Reno, Nevada, U.S.	
30	Win	29–1	Rocky Lockridge	UD	10	Jan 30, 1992	Country Club, Reseda, California, U.S.	
29	Win	28–1	Juan De La Paz	TKO	2 (10)	Nov 26, 1991	Country Club, Reseda, California, U.S.	
28	Loss	27–1	Mauro Gutierrez	KO	2 (12)	Jul 31, 1991	Country Club, Reseda, California, U.S.	For vacant WBC Continental Americas lightweight title
27	Win	27–0	Narciso Valenzuela Romo	UD	10	Jun 25, 1991	Country Club, Reseda, California, U.S.	
26	Win	26–0	Fernando Soldadito Teran	KO	1 (10)	May 17, 1991	Country Club, Reseda, California, U.S.	
25	Win	25–0	Steve Cruz	KO	3 (12)	Mar 31, 1991	Sands Hotel & Casino, Paradise, Nevada, U.S.	Won vacant NABF featherweight title
24	Win	24–0	Vicente Gonzalez	UD	10	Feb 26, 1991	Country Club, Reseda, California, U.S.	
23	Win	23–0	Tomas Valdez	TKO	3 (12)	Jan 14, 1991	Great Western Forum, Inglewood, California, U.S.	Won vacant IBF American featherweight title
22	Win	22–0	Richard Abila	KO	7 (12)	Nov 27, 1990	Country Club, Reseda, California, U.S.	Won vacant USA California State featherweight title
21	Win	21–0	Felipe de Jesus	TKO	7 (10)	Sep 22, 1990	Arco Arena, Sacramento, California, U.S.	
20	Win	20–0	Job Walters	TKO	9 (10)	Aug 17, 1990	Bally's Las Vegas, Paradise, Nevada, U.S.	
19	Win	19–0	Rosendo Alonso	TKO	1 (10)	Jul 31, 1990	Country Club, Reseda, California, U.S.	
18	Win	18–0	Abe Gomez	UD	10	Jun 18, 1990	Great Western Forum, Inglewood, California, U.S.	
17	Win	17–0	Vicente Gonzalez	RTD	5 (10)	May 29, 1990	Country Club, Reseda, California, U.S.	
16	Win	16–0	Arturo Hernandez	TKO	1 (8)	Apr 14, 1990	Mirage Hotel & Casino, Paradise, Nevada, U.S.	
15	Win	15–0	Antonio Sanchez	KO	2 (?)	Mar 8, 1990	Great Western Forum, Inglewood, California, U.S.	
14	Win	14–0	Roberto Rios	TKO	2 (8)	Feb 27, 1990	Country Club, Reseda, California, U.S.	
13	Win	13–0	Simon Contreras	KO	5 (?)	Feb 5, 1990	Great Western Forum, Inglewood, California, U.S.	
12	Win	12–0	Ricardo Flores	KO	1 (8)	Nov 28, 1989	Country Club, Reseda, California, U.S.	
11	Win	11–0	Margarito Ruiz	DQ	1 (6)	Oct 24, 1989	Country Club, Reseda, California, U.S.	
10	Win	10–0	Jose Luis Vazquez	KO	1 (6)	Sep 26, 1989	Country Club, Reseda, California, U.S.	
9	Win	9–0	Joey Quinlan	KO	1 (?)	Aug 29, 1989	Country Club, Reseda, California, U.S.	
8	Win	8–0	Ben Gomez	KO	3 (4)	Jul 14, 1989	Riviera Club, Chicago, Illinois, U.S.	
7	Win	7–0	Chilo Guzman	KO	3 (6)	Jun 27, 1989	Country Club, Reseda, California, U.S.	
6	Win	6–0	Benito Rodriguez	KO	3 (?)	Jun 16, 1989	Sam Houston Coliseum, Houston, Texas, U.S.	
5	Win	5–0	Javier Lara	KO	3 (6)	May 30, 1989	Country Club, Reseda, California, U.S.	
4	Win	4–0	Margarito Arreola	MD	4	Apr 25, 1989	Showboat Hotel & Casino, Las Vegas, Nevada, U.S.	
3	Win	3–0	Leopoldo Maya	TKO	1 (4)	Mar 28, 1989	Showboat Hotel & Casino, Las Vegas, Nevada, U.S.	
2	Win	2–0	Robert Rayford	TKO	3 (4)	Feb 14, 1989	Showboat Hotel & Casino, Atlantic City, New Jersey, U.S.	
1	Win	1–0	Marcos Covarrubias	UD	4	Jan 17, 1989	Caesars Palace, Paradise, Nevada, U.S.	

== Pay-per-view bouts ==
Date	Fight	Billing	Buys	Network
May 6, 1995	De La Hoya vs. Ruelas	La Batalla	330,000	HBO

Preceded by Freddie Pendleton	IBF Lightweight boxing champion 19 February 1994–6 May 1995	Succeeded by Oscar De La Hoya
