= Mark Kennedy (boxer) =

Jamaican boxer (born 1967)

Personal information
- Nationality: Jamaican
- Born: 13 June 1967 (age 58)

Sport
- Sport: Boxing

Mark Kennedy (born 13 June 1967) is a former Jamaican amateur boxer. He competed in the men's lightweight event at the 1988 Summer Olympics.
