= Calvin Grove =

American boxer (born 1962)

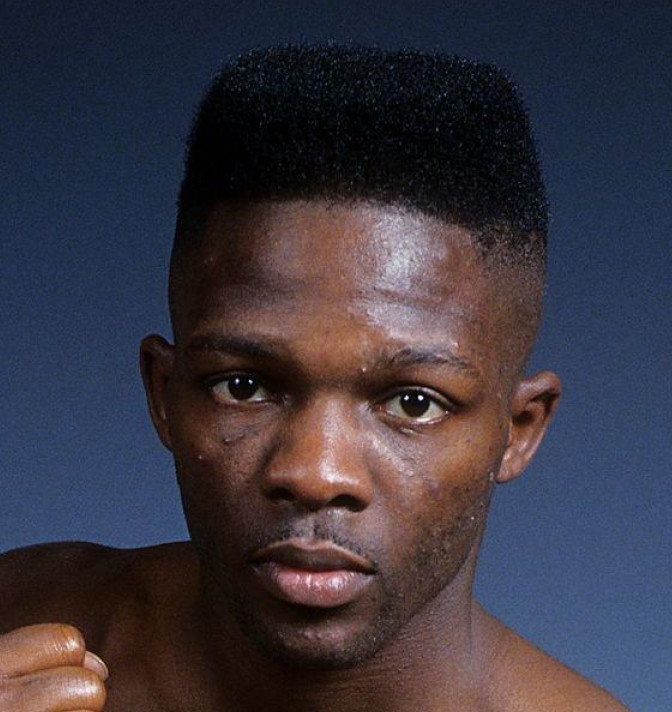
- Grove c. 1988

Personal information
- Nickname: Silky
- Born: August 5, 1962 (age 63) Coatesville, Pennsylvania, U.S.
- Height: 5 ft 7 in (170 cm)
- Weight: Featherweight; Super featherweight; Lightweight

Boxing career
- Reach: 70 in (178 cm)
- Stance: Orthodox

Boxing record
- Total fights: 59
- Wins: 49
- Win by KO: 18
- Losses: 10
- Draws: 0
- No contests: 0

Calvin Grove (born August 5, 1962) is an American former professional boxer who was the Featherweight champion of the world.

== Professional career ==
Grove turned pro in 1982 and in 1988 captured the IBF featherweight title with a TKO over Antonio Rivera. He defended the belt once before losing it to Jorge Páez later that same year. Grove was knocked down three times in the 15th round, a decisive factor in him losing the majority decision. In a rematch with Paez the following year Grove was TKO'd in the 11th. Grove later moved up in weight and in 1992 challenged WBC super featherweight title holder Azumah Nelson, but lost a decision. Grove later moved up in weight again, and in 1994 took on WBC lightweight title holder Miguel Ángel González, but lost via TKO. Grove retired in 1998 after losing via 1st-round KO to Kostya Tszyu.

Two of Grove's most notable victories occurred over Australians: He knocked out International Boxing Hall of Fame member and three division world champion Jeff Fenech in seven rounds on June 7, 1993, and held two wins over former world champion Lester Ellis, one by fourth-round technical knockout.

== See also ==
- List of featherweight boxing champions

Achievements
Regional boxing titles
Preceded by Irving Mitchell	USBA featherweight champion June 28, 1985 – January 23, 1988; Vacated	Vacant Title next held by Jeff Franklin
Vacant Title last held by Harold Knight	USBA super featherweight champion August 20, 1989 – February 8, 1990	Succeeded by Bernard Taylor
World boxing titles
Preceded by Antonio Rivera	IBF featherweight champion January 23 – August 4, 1988	Succeeded by Jorge Páez
