= Nergüin Enkhbat =

Mongolian boxer (1962–2022)

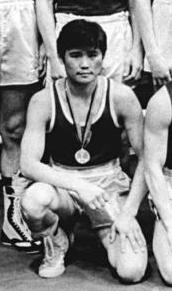
- Nergüin Enkhbat after winning the lightweight section of the XII Chemistry Cup boxing tournament in Halle (GDR) in 1983

Medal record

Men's Boxing

Representing Mongolia

Olympic Games
| Bronze medal – third place | 1988 Seoul | Lightweight |

Goodwill Games
| Bronze medal – third place | 1986 Moscow | Lightweight |

Asian Championships
| Gold medal – first place | 1989 Beijing | Lightweight |
| Silver medal – second place | 1987 Kuwait | Lightweight |

Friendship Games
| Silver medal – second place | 1984 Havana | Lightweight |

Nergüin Enkhbat (Mongolian: Нэргүйн Энхбат; 19 March 1962 – 6 April 2022) was a Mongolian boxer, born in Ulaanbaatar. He was the 1988 Olympic bronze medalist and 1989 Asian champion in the men's lightweight division.

== Boxing career ==
Enkhbat started boxing in 1979 and was a national team′s member until 1989. He became the Mongolian champion six times (1982–1987)

Enkhbat held gold medal at the 1983 Chemistry Cup in the men's lightweight division, by defeating Idel Torriente in the final.

He won the 1984 Golden Belt Tournament and became the 1984 Friendship Games runner-up.

He took gold medal at the 1986 Chemistry Cup in the men's lightweight division, with wins over Aladár Horváth, 1980 Olympic silver medalist and three-time World Champion Adolfo Horta, Andreas Otto, and 1985 World Cup champion Torsten Koch.

Enkhbat held gold medal at the 1986 Golden Belt Tournament in the men's lightweight division, by defeating reigning two-time European Champion Emil Chuprenski in the final.

He received silver medal at the 1987 Asian Championships in the men's lightweight division.

He won вronze medal at the 1988 Summer Olympics in the men's lightweight division.

Enkhbat took gold medal at the 1989 Asian Championships in the men's lightweight division.

In total, he won 240 of 312 fights and received a ″Honored Master of Sports″ title on February 6, 1989.
