= Patrick Waweru =

Kenyan boxer (born 1956)

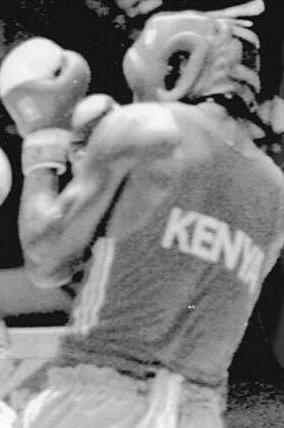
- Waweru in 1989

Personal information
- Nationality: Kenyan
- Born: 9 June 1956 (age 69)

Sport
- Sport: Boxing

Patrick Waweru (born 9 June 1956) is a Kenyan former boxer. He competed at the 1984 Summer Olympics and the 1988 Summer Olympics. At the 1988 Summer Olympics, he lost to Andreas Zulow of East Germany.

Olympic Games
Preceded by James Omondi	Flagbearer for Kenya; Seoul 1988	Succeeded by Patrick Sang
