= Freddie Pendleton =

American boxer

Personal information
- Nickname: Fearless
- Born: Freddie Pendleton; January 5, 1963 (age 63) Philadelphia, Pennsylvania
- Height: 5 ft 8 1/2 in (174 cm)
- Weight: Lightweight; Light-welterweight; Welterweight

Boxing career
- Reach: 72 1/2 in (184 cm)
- Stance: Orthodox

Boxing record
- Total fights: 78
- Wins: 47
- Win by KO: 34
- Losses: 26
- Draws: 5

Freddie Pendleton (born January 5, 1963) is an American former professional boxer who competed from 1981 to 2001. He held the International Boxing Federation (IBF) lightweight title from 1993 to 1994.

== Professional career ==
Pendleton won his first title in October 1985 knocking out Darryl Martin (9–2) in the 6th round earning him the Pennsylvania State light welterweight title.

In March 1986, "Fearless", who was (14–13) at the time, took on Roger Mayweather (23–3) at the Sahara Hotel in Las Vegas, Nevada. He knocked out Roger in the 6th round for a TKO win.

Four months later, Pendleton took on Frankie Randall (27–1) for the second time; it was for the vacant USBA lightweight title. The fight went the distance and was a draw. Freddie later won the USBA lightweight title and defended it successfully in 1987 and 1988.

In 1990, Pendleton fought a world title against unified WBC & IBF lightweight champion, Pernell Whitaker (20–1). Although prior to the contest, few had placed much faith in Freddie's abilities to provide a competitive effort in the fight, due to his 24–16 record, Freddie did just that. The fight turned out to be far better than anyone had expected with Pendleton up against one of best fighters in the world. Although the outcome was declared as a unanimous decision win for Whitaker, most observers generally thought the fight was much closer than the scorecards reflected. Judges Jim Traylor and Stuart Winston scored it 116–112, with Phil Newman 117–113, all for Pernell Whitaker.

In 1993, Pendleton captured the Vacant IBF lightweight title with a decision win over Tracy Spann. He defended his title once before losing it to Rafael Ruelas in 1994.

Although he continued to fight until 2001, Pendleton never regained a major belt, losing to IBF welterweight title holder Félix Trinidad in 1996, IBF light welterweight title holder Vince Phillips in 1997, and WBA welterweight title holder James Page in 1999.

He retired in 2001 after being knocked out by Ricky Hatton.

On June 26, 2011, Freddie Pendleton was inducted into the Florida Boxing Hall of Fame.

== Professional boxing record ==
78 fights	47 wins	26 losses
By knockout	35	7
By decision	12	18
By disqualification	0	1
Draws	5	

No.	Result	Record	Opponent	Type	Round	Date	Location	Notes
78	Loss	47–26–5	Ricky Hatton	KO	2 (12)	Oct 27, 2001	M.E.N. Arena, Manchester, Lancashire, England, U.K.	For WBC International light welterweight title
77	Win	47–25–5	Horatio García	TKO	1 (12)	Jul 21, 2001	Feather Falls Casino, Oroville, California, U.S.	Won vacant IBA Americas welterweight title
76	Draw	46–25–5	Humberto Herrera	TD	9 (10)	Jan 13, 2001	Barranquilla, Colombia	
75	Loss	46–25–4	Ben Tackie	KO	1 (10)	Aug 18, 2000	Lucky Star Casino, Concho, Oklahoma, U.S.	
74	Win	46–24–4	Gilberto Flores	TKO	1 (8)	May 12, 2000	Jim Davidson Theatre, Pembroke Pines, Florida, U.S.	
73	Win	45–24–4	Ed Goins	KO	2 (10)	Mar 17, 2000	Jim Davidson Theatre, Pembroke Pines, Florida, U.S.	
72	Loss	44–24–4	James Page	TKO	11 (12)	Jul 24, 1999	Flamingo Hilton, Las Vegas, Nevada, U.S.	For WBA welterweight title
71	Win	44–23–4	Freddy Rojas	KO	5 (10)	Dec 18, 1998	Memorial Auditorium, Fort Lauderdale, Florida, U.S.	
70	Loss	43–23–4	Terron Millett	UD	12	May 29, 1998	Las Vegas Hilton, Las Vegas, Nevada, U.S.	For vacant USBA light welterweight title
69	Loss	43–22–4	Vince Phillips	TKO	10 (12)	Dec 13, 1997	Amphitheater, Pompano Beach, Florida, U.S.	For IBF light welterweight title
68	Win	43–21–4	Kevin Sedam	KO	1 (10)	Aug 11, 1997	Argosy Casino, Kansas City, Missouri, U.S.	
67	Win	42–21–4	James Martinez	TKO	2 (?)	Apr 19, 1997	Memorial Auditorium, Shreveport, Louisiana, U.S.	
66	Win	41–21–4	Mike Bryan	TKO	2 (10)	Oct 15, 1996	Pepsi Coliseum, Indianapolis, Indiana, U.S.	
65	Loss	40–21–4	Félix Trinidad	KO	5 (12)	May 18, 1996	Mirage Hotel & Casino, Las Vegas, Nevada, U.S.	For IBF welterweight title
64	Win	40–20–4	Ralph Southerland	KO	1 (10)	Jan 13, 1996	Jai Alai Fronton, Miami, Florida, U.S.	
63	Win	39–20–4	Tony Lopez	TKO	8 (12)	Aug 12, 1995	MGM Grand, Las Vegas, Nevada, U.S.	Retained USBA light welterweight title
62	Win	38–20–4	Darryl Tyson	TKO	10 (12)	Apr 29, 1995	US Air Arena, Landover, Maryland, U.S.	Won USBA light welterweight title
61	Win	37–20–4	Clarence Coleman	KO	2 (10)	Mar 1, 1995	Memorial Auditorium, Fort Lauderdale, Florida, U.S.	
60	Win	36–20–4	Steve Larrimore	KO	10 (10)	Dec 9, 1994	Saint Petersburg, Florida, U.S.	
59	Loss	35–20–4	Giovanni Parisi	SD	10	Sep 17, 1994	MGM Grand, Grand Garden Arena, Las Vegas, Nevada, U.S.	
58	Loss	35–19–4	Rafael Ruelas	UD	12	Feb 19, 1994	Great Western Forum, Inglewood, California, U.S.	Lost IBF lightweight title
57	Loss	35–18–4	Ed Pollard	DQ	3 (8)	Dec 4, 1993	Jai Alai Fronton, Miami, Florida, U.S.	
56	Win	35–17–4	Jorge Páez	UD	12	Jul 17, 1993	Caesars Palace, Las Vegas, Nevada, U.S.	Retained IBF lightweight title
55	Win	34–17–4	Cruz Saldana	KO	2 (10)	May 15, 1993	Soref Jewish Community Center, Plantation, Florida, U.S.	
54	Win	33–17–4	Tracy Spann	UD	12	Jan 10, 1993	Harrah's Marina Hotel Casino, Atlantic City, New Jersey, U.S.	Won vacant IBF lightweight title
53	Draw	32–17–4	Tracy Spann	TD	2 (12)	Aug 29, 1992	Reno-Sparks Convention Center, Reno, Nevada, U.S.	For vacant IBF lightweight title
52	Win	32–17–3	Edison Martinez	KO	1 (10)	Nov 23, 1991	Jai Alai Fronton, Miami, Florida, U.S.	
51	Win	31–17–3	Felix Dubray	KO	1 (?)	Jul 20, 1991	Teatro Ariston, San Remo, Liguria, Italy	
50	Win	30–17–3	Eric Podolak	TKO	5 (10)	Jun 18, 1991	Convention Center, Washington, D.C., U.S.	
49	Win	29–17–3	Jose A Rivera	KO	1 (?)	Feb 16, 1991	Bingo Hall, Lancaster, South Carolina, U.S.	
48	Win	28–17–3	Steve Larrimore	TKO	1 (12)	Oct 23, 1990	Trump Plaza Hotel, Atlantic City, New Jersey, U.S.	Retained USBA lightweight title
47	Win	27–17–3	Luis Portocarrero	TKO	5 (10)	Sep 7, 1990	National Arena, Kingston, Jamaica	
46	Win	26–17–3	Tim Brooks	UD	12	Jun 26, 1990	Hyatt Regency, Tampa, Florida, U.S.	Retained USBA lightweight title
45	Win	25–17–3	Mario Salazar	TKO	2 (?)	May 5, 1990	Brown County Arena, Green Bay, Wisconsin, U.S.	
44	Loss	24–17–3	Pernell Whitaker	UD	12	Feb 3, 1990	Convention Hall, Atlantic City, New Jersey, U.S.	For WBC and IBF lightweight titles
43	Win	24–16–3	Carlos Brandi	TKO	1 (10)	Sep 15, 1989	Jai Alai Fronton, Miami, Florida, U.S.	
42	Loss	23–16–3	John Montes	KO	10 (10)	Nov 22, 1988	Great Western Forum, Inglewood, California, U.S.	
41	Win	23–15–3	Akwei Addo	TKO	6 (10)	Sep 13, 1988	Great Western Forum, Inglewood, California, U.S.	
40	Win	22–15–3	Livingstone Bramble	TKO	10 (12)	Jul 10, 1988	Sands Casino Hotel, Atlantic City, New Jersey, U.S.	Retained USBA lightweight title
39	Win	21–15–3	Steve Larrimore	TKO	4 (10)	Mar 16, 1988	Resorts International, Atlantic City, New Jersey, U.S.	
38	Win	20–15–3	Sammy Fuentes	TKO	1 (10)	Feb 12, 1988	Resorts International, Atlantic City, New Jersey, U.S.	
37	Win	19–15–3	Elvis Perez	TKO	8 (12)	Sep 28, 1987	Santo Domingo, Dominican Republic	Won vacant USBA lightweight title
36	Win	18–15–3	Ronald Haynes	KO	6 (10)	Jul 28, 1987	Ballys Park Place Hotel Casino, Atlantic City, New Jersey, U.S.	
35	Draw	17–15–3	Livingstone Bramble	MD	10	Apr 3, 1987	Sands Casino Hotel, Atlantic City, New Jersey, U.S.	
34	Loss	17–15–2	Shelton LeBlanc	UD	10	Dec 2, 1986	Cajun Dome, Lafayette, Louisiana, U.S.	
33	Loss	17–14–2	Joey Olivera	SD	10	Oct 7, 1986	Forum, Inglewood, California, U.S.	
32	Win	17–13–2	Manuel Hernandez	KO	2 (10)	Aug 29, 1986	Forum, Inglewood, California, U.S.	
31	Draw	16–13–2	Frankie Randall	SD	12	Jul 4, 1986	Resorts International, Atlantic City, New Jersey, U.S.	For vacant USBA lightweight title
30	Win	16–13–1	Shelton LeBlanc	UD	10	Apr 11, 1986	Sahara Hotel & Casino, Space Center, Las Vegas, Nevada, U.S.	
29	Win	15–13–1	Roger Mayweather	KO	6 (10)	Mar 12, 1986	Sahara Hotel & Casino, Space Center, Las Vegas, Nevada, U.S.	
28	Win	14–13–1	Roberto Mendez	TKO	8 (8)	Jan 24, 1986	Resorts International, Atlantic City, New Jersey, U.S.	
27	Loss	13–13–1	Jimmy Paul	UD	10	Nov 20, 1985	Resorts International, Atlantic City, New Jersey, U.S.	
26	Win	13–12–1	Darryl Martin	TKO	6 (12)	Oct 1, 1985	Zembo Shrine, Harrisburg, Pennsylvania, U.S.	Won USA Pennsylvania State light welterweight title
25	Loss	12–12–1	Frankie Randall	TKO	5 (10)	Mar 23, 1985	Viking Hall, Bristol, Tennessee, U.S.	
24	Loss	12–11–1	Joe Manley	UD	10	Feb 5, 1985	Atlantis Hotel & Casino, Atlantic City, New Jersey, U.S.	
23	Loss	12–10–1	Ricky Young	SD	8	Jan 19, 1985	Imperial Ballroom, Atlantic City, New Jersey, U.S.	
22	Win	12–9–1	Marvin Garris	SD	8	Jan 4, 1985	Mayfair Ballroom, Philadelphia, Pennsylvania, U.S.	
21	Loss	11–9–1	Adolfo Medel	UD	10	Nov 14, 1984	Resorts International, Atlantic City, New Jersey, U.S.	
20	Win	11–8–1	Tyrone Trice	TKO	1 (10)	Jun 28, 1984	Riverview Ballroom Cobo Arena, Detroit, Michigan, U.S.	
19	Loss	10–8–1	Hilmer Kenty	UD	10	Apr 19, 1984	Cobo Hall, Detroit, Michigan, U.S.	
18	Win	10–7–1	Luis Vega	PTS	4	Mar 3, 1984	Ballys Park Place Hotel Casino, Atlantic City, New Jersey, U.S.	
17	Win	9–7–1	Tim Daniels	UD	4	Jan 14, 1984	Resorts International, Atlantic City, New Jersey, U.S.	
16	Win	8–7–1	David Grayton	PTS	8	Dec 10, 1983	Andrews Air Base, Baltimore, Maryland, U.S.	
15	Draw	7–7–1	Ken Willis	PTS	4	Nov 5, 1983	Showboat Hotel & Casino, Atlantic City, New Jersey, U.S.	
14	Loss	7–7	Anthony Fletcher	UD	10	May 22, 1983	Showboat Hotel & Casino, Atlantic City, New Jersey, U.S.	
13	Win	7–6	Jose Rodriguez	UD	6	Apr 24, 1983	Showboat Hotel & Casino, Atlantic City, New Jersey, U.S.	
12	Loss	6–6	Bobby Johnson	UD	8	Mar 27, 1983	Watres Armory, Scranton, Pennsylvania, U.S.	
11	Loss	6–5	Gerald Hayes	PTS	8	Oct 26, 1982	Tropicana Hotel & Casino, Atlantic City, New Jersey, U.S.	
10	Win	6–4	Lloyd Allen	TKO	6 (6)	Oct 12, 1982	Tropicana Hotel & Casino, Atlantic City, New Jersey, U.S.	
9	Win	5–4	Antonio Nieves	SD	8	Aug 15, 1982	Sands Casino Hotel, Atlantic City, New Jersey, U.S.	
8	Win	4–4	Felix McKnight	SD	4	Jul 20, 1982	Tropicana Hotel & Casino, Atlantic City, New Jersey, U.S.	
7	Win	3–4	Ray Evans	TKO	4 (?)	May 11, 1982	Tropicana Hotel & Casino, Atlantic City, New Jersey, U.S.	
6	Loss	2–4	Jerome Coffee	UD	8	Mar 10, 1982	Radisson Hotel, Nashville, Tennessee, U.S.	
5	Win	2–3	Felix McKnight	PTS	4	Feb 23, 1982	Tropicana Hotel & Casino, Atlantic City, New Jersey, U.S.	
4	Loss	1–3	Rodney Watts	PTS	4	Feb 16, 1982	Tropicana Hotel & Casino, Atlantic City, New Jersey, U.S.	
3	Loss	1–2	Angel Cales	PTS	4	Feb 11, 1982	Golden Eagle Caterers, Philadelphia, Pennsylvania, U.S.	
2	Win	1–1	Anthony English	KO	2 (?)	Dec 3, 1981	Golden Eagle Caterers, Philadelphia, Pennsylvania, U.S.	
1	Loss	0–1	Ray Evans	PTS	4	Nov 5, 1981	Golden Eagle Caterers, Philadelphia, Pennsylvania, U.S.	

== See also ==
- List of IBF world champions

Sporting positions
Regional boxing titles
Vacant Title last held by Pernell Whitaker	USBA lightweight champion September 28, 1987 – October 23, 1990	Succeeded by Carl Griffith
World boxing titles
Vacant Title last held by Pernell Whitaker	IBF lightweight champion January 10, 1993 – February 19, 1994	Succeeded by Rafael Ruelas
