= Lee Gang-seok =

South Korean boxer

Personal information
- Nationality: South Korean
- Born: 23 May 1967 (age 57); Uijeongbu, Gyeonggi-do, South Korea

Sport
- Sport: Boxing

Lee Gang-seok (born 23 May 1967) is a South Korean boxer. He competed in the men's lightweight event at the 1988 Summer Olympics.
