= Kibar Tatar =

Turkish boxer

Personal information
- Nationality: Turkish
- Born: 15 November 1968 (age 56)

Sport
- Sport: Boxing

Kibar Tatar (born 15 November 1968) is a Turkish boxer. He competed in the men's lightweight event at the 1988 Summer Olympics.
