= Jorge Páez =

Mexican boxer (born 1965)

Personal information
- Nickname: El Maromero
- Born: Jorge Adolfo Páez; October 27, 1965 (age 60) Mexicali, Baja California, Mexico
- Height: 5 ft 5 in (1.65 m)
- Weight: Featherweight; Super featherweight Lightweight

Boxing career
- Reach: 69 in (175 cm)
- Stance: Orthodox

Boxing record
- Total fights: 98
- Wins: 79
- Win by KO: 52
- Losses: 14
- Draws: 5

Jorge Adolfo Páez (born October 27, 1965) is a Mexican actor, circus performer, religious preacher and former professional boxer. In boxing he held the WBO and IBF world featherweight titles. Paez's nickname of "El Maromero" is in honor of the somersault (referred to in Spanish as "maroma") acts he performs at the circus. It was in the circus that he learned acrobatic moves he would later use in the boxing ring. Páez is also the father of Azriel Páez, Jorge Páez Jr., and Airam Páez.

== Personal life ==
Paez had been a circus performer in his northwest Mexico hometown since he was very young. Jorge started boxing in San Luis Río Colorado. He is also the father of welterweight prospect Azriel Páez and WBC Youth Intercontinental welterweight champion Jorge Páez Jr.

== Professional career ==
=== Early years ===
Paez began boxing professionally on November 16, 1984, knocking out Efren Treno in three rounds.

=== Featherweight champion ===
From there on, he built a string of wins that led him to challenge IBF featherweight champion Calvin Grove in boxing's last 15 round world title fight. Paez was trailing on all three scorecards, but dropped the champion three times in the last round. The knockdowns provided an edge on the scorecards, making Paez IBF featherweight champion by a unanimous decision. He defended the title eight times, including a knockout in 11 against Grove in a rematch, a unanimous decision win former world champion Stevie Cruz and a split decision against future world champion Troy Dorsey.

He then won the WBO featherweight title in a unification bout against Louie Espinoza (in a rematch of their 1989 fight that ended in a draw) by split decision.

Paez then vacated his titles and moved up in weight, only to lose to IBF super featherweight champion Tony Lopez. Paez continued to fight, but he had mixed results versus former world champion Lupe Suarez and against Tracy Spann; he and Suarez drew in 10 rounds, and he beat Spann by a 10-round decision.

=== Lightweight ===
On October 10, 1991, Paez moved up to lightweight and fought against Pernell Whitaker for the WBC, WBA and IBF lightweight titles but lost by unanimous decision.

On November 6, 1992, Paez fought against future world champion Rafael Ruelas for the NABF lightweight title, losing by TKO in the 10 round. On July 17, 1993, he lost to Freddie Pendleton by a decision in twelve for the IBF lightweight title

On July 29, 1994, he was given a shot at the vacant WBO lightweight title against rising superstar Oscar De La Hoya. Paez lost by a knockout in round two.

=== Later years ===
Paez then went up against WBA super featherweight champion Genaro Hernandez in a non-title bout, losing by TKO in the 8th round due to cuts. On August 17, 1996, he won the WBC Continental Americas super featherweight regional title by knocking out Narciso Valenzuela in 3 rounds. Paez would then lose that title in his next match against Julian Wheeler but regained it by beating Wheeler in the rematch.

On August 7, 1997, he lost by a knockout in eight rounds to Angel Manfredy. After three victories, Paez lost via a devastating one-punch knockout in seven rounds to Augie Sanchez in May 1999. In his next bout in October 1999, Paez boxed future lightweight champion Jose Luis Castillo, losing by KO in the fifth round.

Paez continued to box on over the next few years, winning a long string of bouts against a lower level of opposition.

=== Injuries and Retirement ===
Paez was supposed to fight Jesús Chávez on March 29, 2003. However, it was discovered that Paez suffered from brain swelling, putting the fight with Jesús Chávez and his career in serious jeopardy. Despite these findings, Paez fought on, and on December 5, 2003, in Phoenix, Arizona, he defeated Scott McCraken by a ten-round split decision in what would be Paez's final match.

His overall record was 79-14-5 (51 KOs).

== Professional boxing record ==
98 fights	79 wins	14 losses
By knockout	52	6
By decision	27	7
By disqualification	0	1
Draws	5	

No.	Result	Record	Opponent	Type	Round	Date	Location	Notes
98	Win	79–14–5	Scott McCracken	SD	10	Dec 5, 2003	Dodge Theater, Phoenix, Arizona, U.S.	
97	Win	78–14–5	Rodney Jones	UD	10	Sep 26, 2003	DePaul Athletic Center, Chicago, Illinois, U.S.	
96	Win	77–14–5	Rubén Galván	UD	10	Jul 25, 2003	Celebrity Theater, Phoenix, Arizona, U.S.	
95	Win	76–14–5	Silverio Ortiz	TD	7 (10)	Feb 7, 2003	HP Pavilion, San Jose, California, U.S.	
94	Win	75–14–5	Sandro Marcos	TKO	3 (10)	Dec 13, 2002	Desert Diamond Casino, Tucson, Arizona, U.S.	
93	Win	74–14–5	Juan Angel Macias	TKO	8 (10)	Sep 28, 2002	Arrowhead Pond, Anaheim, California, U.S.	
92	Win	73–14–5	Agustin Lorenzo	KO	3 (10)	Jun 26, 2002	Palace Indian Gaming Center, Lemoore, California, U.S.	
91	Win	72–14–5	Mike Juarez	KO	5 (10)	May 17, 2002	Memorial Coliseum, Corpus Christi, Texas, U.S.	
90	Win	71–14–5	Tom Johnson	TKO	2 (10)	Feb 22, 2002	Palace Indian Gaming Center, Lemoore, California, U.S.	
89	Draw	70–14–5	Justo Sanchez	TD	1 (10)	Sep 23, 2001	Stateline Casino, West Wendover, Utah, U.S.	
88	Win	70–14–4	Verdell Smith	TKO	3 (10)	Sep 7, 2001	Aguascalientes, Aguascalientes, Mexico	
87	Win	69–14–4	Adarryl Johnson	TKO	5 (10)	Jun 24, 2001	Coeur d'Alene Casino, Worley, Idaho, U.S.	
86	Win	68–14–4	Verdell Smith	UD	10	Apr 22, 2001	Casino Magic, Bay Saint Louis, Mississippi, U.S.	
85	Win	67–14–4	Michael Davis	MD	10	Nov 26, 2000	Midnight Rodeo, Phoenix, Arizona, U.S.	
84	Win	66–14–4	Justo Sanchez	SD	10	Sep 24, 2000	Silver Smith Casino, West Wendover, Nevada, U.S.	
83	Win	65–14–4	Jorge Ramirez	TKO	5 (10)	Aug 26, 2000	Selland Arena, Fresno, California, U.S.	
82	Win	64–14–4	Angel Aldama	RTD	3 (10)	Apr 29, 2000	Peppermill Hotel & Casino, Reno, Nevada, U.S.	
81	Win	63–14–4	Jose Antonio Ocampo	KO	2 (10)	Apr 8, 2000	Blancas Bazaar, Imperial Beach, California, U.S.	
80	Loss	62–14–4	José Luis Castillo	TKO	5 (12)	Oct 15, 1999	Plaza de Toros Calafia, Mexicali, Baja California, Mexico	For vacant IBA super featherweight title
79	Loss	62–13–4	Augie Sanchez	KO	7 (10)	May 8, 1999	Hilton Hotel, Las Vegas, Nevada, U.S.	
78	Win	62–12–4	Juan Polo Perez	KO	2 (12)	Nov 14, 1998	County Coliseum, El Paso, Texas, U.S.	Won vacant IBA Americas super featherweight title
77	Win	61–12–4	Victor Hugo Paz	UD	10	Sep 12, 1998	Fantasy Springs Casino, Indio, California, U.S.	
76	Win	60–12–4	Juan Angel Macias	KO	6 (12)	Mar 28, 1998	Tropicana Hotel & Casino, Las Vegas, Nevada, U.S.	Won vacant NABU super featherweight title
75	Loss	59–12–4	Angel Manfredy	TKO	8 (12)	Aug 2, 1997	Mohegan Sun Casino, Uncasville, Connecticut, U.S.	For WBU super featherweight title
74	Win	59–11–4	Gerald Gray	RTD	5 (12)	Apr 26, 1997	Caesars Palace, Las Vegas, Nevada, U.S.	Retained WBC Continental Americas super featherweight title
73	Win	58–11–4	Julian Wheeler	SD	12	Jan 13, 1997	Great Western Forum, Inglewood, California, U.S.	Won WBC Continental Americas super featherweight title
72	Loss	57–11–4	Julian Wheeler	UD	12	Oct 19, 1996	Caesars Tahoe, Stateline, Nevada, U.S.	Lost WBC Continental Americas super featherweight title
71	Win	57–10–4	Narciso Valenzuela Romo	KO	3 (12)	Aug 17, 1996	Caesars Tahoe, Stateline, Nevada, U.S.	Won vacant WBC Continental Americas super featherweight title
70	Win	56–10–4	José Sanabria	TKO	6 (10)	May 4, 1996	Arrowhead Pond, Anaheim, California, U.S.	
69	Win	55–10–4	Paris Alexander	TKO	5 (10)	Feb 15, 1996	Olympic Auditorium, Los Angeles, California, U.S.	
68	Win	54–10–4	Anthony Johnson	UD	10	Nov 16, 1995	Great Western Forum, Inglewood, California, U.S.	
67	Loss	53–10–4	Jose Vida Ramos	SD	12	Sep 30, 1995	Caesars Tahoe, Circus Maximus Showroom, Lake Tahoe, Nevada, U.S.	For vacant WBO NABO super featherweight title
66	Loss	53–9–4	Jose Vida Ramos	DQ	5 (10)	Jul 8, 1995	Caesars Palace, Sports Pavilion, Las Vegas, Nevada, U.S.	
65	Loss	53–8–4	Genaro Hernandez	TKO	8 (10)	Mar 31, 1995	Arrowhead Pond, Anaheim, California, U.S.	
64	Loss	53–7–4	Oscar De La Hoya	KO	2 (12)	Jul 29, 1994	MGM Grand, Las Vegas, Nevada, U.S.	For vacant WBO lightweight title
63	Win	53–6–4	Juan Gomez	UD	10	Jun 11, 1994	Great Western Forum, Inglewood, California, U.S.	
62	Win	52–6–4	Mauricio Aceves	UD	10	Apr 11, 1994	Great Western Forum, Inglewood, California, U.S.	
61	Win	51–6–4	Andres Sandoval	RTD	5 (10)	Feb 19, 1994	Great Western Forum, Inglewood, California, U.S.	
60	Win	50–6–4	Dominick Monaco	TKO	5 (?)	Nov 20, 1993	Morelia, Michoacán de Ocampo, Mexico	
59	Win	49–6–4	Raul Franco	TKO	10 (10)	Nov 15, 1993	Great Western Forum, Inglewood, California, U.S.	
58	Win	48–6–4	Danny Romero	KO	1 (?)	Oct 15, 1993	Nogales, Veracruz, Mexico	Not the American boxer Danny Romero
57	Win	47–6–4	Erick Madrid	TKO	4 (10)	Sep 13, 1993	Great Western Forum, Inglewood, California, U.S.	
56	Loss	46–6–4	Freddie Pendleton	UD	12	Jul 17, 1993	Caesars Palace, Las Vegas, Nevada, U.S.	For IBF lightweight title
55	Win	46–5–4	Jesse Torres	UD	10	May 18, 1993	Great Western Forum, Inglewood, California, U.S.	
54	Win	45–5–4	Ramon Felix	TKO	8 (10)	Mar 13, 1993	Hilton Hotel, Las Vegas, Nevada, U.S.	
53	Win	44–5–4	Alberto Castro	TKO	3 (10)	Dec 11, 1992	Centro de Usos Multiples, Hermosillo, Sonora, Mexico	
52	Loss	43–5–4	Rafael Ruelas	RTD	10 (12)	Nov 6, 1992	Great Western Forum, Inglewood, California, U.S.	For vacant NABF lightweight title
51	Win	43–4–4	Brian Brown	TKO	6 (10)	Aug 24, 1992	Great Western Forum, Inglewood, California, U.S.	
50	Win	42–4–4	Roger Bonine	KO	1 (10)	Jul 17, 1992	Great Western Forum, Inglewood, California, U.S.	
49	Win	41–4–4	Eduardo Perez	UD	10	May 29, 1992	Plaza de Toros Calafia, Mexicali, Baja California, Mexico	
48	Win	40–4–4	Johnny De La Rosa	UD	10	Mar 27, 1992	Palacio de los Deportes, Mexico City, Distrito Federal, Mexico	
47	Win	39–4–4	Benny Medina	UD	10	Feb 17, 1992	Palenque del Hipódromo de Agua Caliente, Tijuana, Baja California, Mexico	
46	Loss	38–4–4	Pernell Whitaker	UD	12	Oct 5, 1991	Reno-Sparks Convention Center, Reno, Nevada, U.S.	For WBA, WBC, and IBF lightweight titles
45	Win	38–3–4	Tracy Spann	MD	10	Jun 14, 1991	Arco Arena, Sacramento, California, U.S.	
44	Draw	37–3–4	Lupe Suarez	TD	4 (10)	Apr 19, 1991	Convention Center, Atlantic City, New Jersey, U.S.	
43	Win	37–3–3	Jorge Ramirez	MD	10	Mar 8, 1991	Centro de Usos Multiples, Hermosillo, Sonora, Mexico	
42	Win	36–3–3	Javier Marquez	TKO	3 (10)	Jan 6, 1991	Plaza de Toros Calafia, Mexicali, Baja California, Mexico	
41	Loss	35–3–3	Tony Lopez	UD	12	Sep 22, 1990	Arco Arena, Sacramento, California, U.S.	Lost IBF featherweight title
40	Draw	35–2–3	Troy Dorsey	SD	12	Jul 8, 1990	Hilton Hotel, Las Vegas, Nevada, U.S.	Retained IBF and WBO featherweight titles
39	Win	35–2–2	Louie Espinoza	SD	12	Apr 7, 1990	Hilton Hotel, Las Vegas, Nevada, U.S.	Retained IBF featherweight title; Won WBO featherweight title
38	Win	34–2–2	Troy Dorsey	SD	12	Feb 4, 1990	Las Vegas Hilton, Las Vegas, Nevada, U.S.	Retained IBF featherweight title
37	Win	33–2–2	Lupe Gutierrez	TKO	6 (12)	Dec 9, 1989	Lawlor Events Center, Reno, Nevada, U.S.	Retained IBF featherweight title
36	Win	32–2–2	Fernando Segura	UD	4	Nov 11, 1989	Arena Mexico, Mexico City, Distrito Federal, Mexico	
35	Win	31–2–2	Allan Makitoki	TKO	6 (10)	Oct 23, 1989	Great Western Forum, Inglewood, California, U.S.	
34	Win	30–2–2	Jose Mario Lopez	KO	2 (12)	Sep 16, 1989	Monumental Plaza de Toros México, Mexico City, Distrito Federal, Mexico	Retained IBF featherweight title
33	Win	29–2–2	Steve Cruz	UD	12	Aug 6, 1989	County Coliseum, El Paso, Texas, U.S.	Retained IBF featherweight title
32	Draw	28–2–2	Louie Espinoza	SD	12	May 21, 1989	Veteran's Memorial Coliseum, Phoenix, Arizona, U.S.	Retained IBF featherweight title
31	Win	28–2–1	Calvin Grove	TKO	11 (12)	Mar 30, 1989	Plaza de Toros Calafia, Mexicali, Baja California, Mexico	Retained IBF featherweight title
30	Win	27–2–1	Miguel Molina	KO	6 (?)	Sep 30, 1988	Ciudad Juarez, Chihuahua, Mexico	
29	Win	26–2–1	Calvin Grove	MD	15	Aug 4, 1988	Plaza de Toros Calafia, Mexicali, Baja California, Mexico	Won IBF featherweight title
28	Win	25–2–1	Martin Garcia	KO	6 (?)	May 28, 1988	Plaza de Toros, Tijuana, Baja California, Mexico	
27	Win	24–2–1	Rafael Toledo	TKO	2 (10)	Apr 22, 1988	Plaza de Toros Calafia, Mexicali, Baja California, Mexico	
26	Win	23–2–1	Carlos Linares	KO	3 (?)	Apr 4, 1988	Tijuana, Baja California, Mexico	
25	Win	22–2–1	Rosendo Alonso	KO	1 (?)	Feb 26, 1988	La Paz, Baja California Sur, Mexico	
24	Win	21–2–1	Elpidio Infante	RTD	7 (10)	Feb 5, 1988	Auditorio del Estado, Mexicali, Baja California, Mexico	
23	Win	20–2–1	Martin Torres	KO	4 (10)	Dec 18, 1987	Auditorio del Estado, Mexicali, Baja California, Mexico	
22	Win	19–2–1	Jesus Lopez	KO	2 (10)	Dec 4, 1987	Auditorio del Estado, Mexicali, Baja California, Mexico	
21	Win	18–2–1	Robert Lewis	UD	10	Oct 30, 1987	Plaza de Toros Calafia, Mexicali, Baja California, Mexico	
20	Win	17–2–1	Refugio Alvarado	TKO	7 (10)	Jul 25, 1987	Palacio de los Deportes, Mexico City, Distrito Federal, Mexico	
19	Win	16–2–1	Arnel Arrozal	RTD	5 (10)	May 22, 1987	Plaza de Toros Calafia, Mexicali, Baja California, Mexico	
18	Win	15–2–1	Silvestre Castillo	KO	6 (6)	Apr 25, 1987	Palacio de los Deportes, Mexico City, Distrito Federal, Mexico	
17	Win	14–2–1	Marco Antonio Santos	KO	5 (10)	Mar 20, 1987	Plaza de Toros Calafia, Mexicali, Baja California, Mexico	
16	Win	13–2–1	Alejandro Mayorga	UD	10	Mar 1, 1987	Auditorio del Estado, Mexicali, Baja California, Mexico	
15	Win	12–2–1	Jose Millan	KO	2 (10)	Feb 15, 1987	Auditorio del Estado, Mexicali, Baja California, Mexico	
14	Win	11–2–1	Alejandro Mayorga	UD	10	Jan 1, 1987	Auditorio del Estado, Mexicali, Baja California, Mexico	
13	Win	10–2–1	Noe Gonzalez	KO	3 (10)	Dec 6, 1986	Auditorio del Estado, Mexicali, Baja California, Mexico	
12	Win	9–2–1	Carlos Galan	KO	1 (10)	Oct 3, 1986	Auditorio del Estado, Mexicali, Baja California, Mexico	
11	Win	8–2–1	Jesus Rojas	PTS	10	Sep 16, 1986	Auditorio Municipal, Torreon, Coahuila de Zaragoza, Mexico	
10	Loss	7–2–1	Miguel Molina	PTS	6	Jul 28, 1986	Tijuana, Baja California, Mexico	
9	Win	7–1–1	Martin Moreno	KO	1 (6)	Jun 27, 1986	San Luis Rio Colorado, Sonora, Mexico	
8	Win	6–1–1	Salvador Sara	KO	1 (?)	Apr 22, 1986	San Luis Rio Colorado, Sonora, Mexico	
7	Win	5–1–1	Efren Tineo	KO	3 (6)	Nov 1, 1985	Auditorio del Estado, Mexicali, Baja California, Mexico	
6	Draw	4–1–1	Mario Rivera	PTS	6	Jul 29, 1985	Arena Tijuana 72, Tijuana, Mexico	
5	Loss	4–1	Salomon Villavicencio	PTS	4	Apr 16, 1985	Tijuana, Mexico	
4	Win	4–0	Jose Luis Luna	TKO	1 (4),	Mar 30, 1985	Auditorio del Estado, Mexicali, Mexico	
3	Win	3–0	Manuel Armenta	KO	1	Feb 8, 1985	Sonora, Mexico	
2	Win	2–0	Julio Cesar Medina	KO	2	Dec 14, 1984	Sonora, Mexico	
1	Win	1–0	Efren Tineo	TKO	3	Nov 16, 1984	Sonora, Mexico	

== Outside the Ring ==
In 1993 he made the movie Zapatos Viejos, where he starred alongside Gloria Trevi, playing "Ernesto". In 1995, he made his Hollywood acting debut in the low-budget movie Dirty Money.

Paez's name surfaced in the 2004 FBI investigation against promoter Bob Arum. The FBI was investigating whether Paez's win over Verdell Smith was a fixed fight or not.

Paez had a brief supporting role with World Wrestling Entertainment as an associate of Rey Mysterio, and accompanied him to the ring at the No Way Out pay-per-view event on February 15, 2004. Paez also appeared in Mysterio's music video for his song from the WWE Originals album, "Crossing Borders."

=== Religion ===
Paez is a Jehovah's Witness preacher in Las Vegas, Nevada.

== See also ==
- Notable boxing families
- List of featherweight boxing champions
- List of IBF world champions
- List of Mexican boxing world champions

Achievements
Preceded by Calvin Grove	IBF featherweight champion 4 August 1988 - 14 March 1991; Vacated	Succeeded by Troy Dorsey
Preceded by Louie Espinoza	WBO featherweight champion 7 April 1990 – 17 January 1991; Vacated	Succeeded by Maurizio Stecca
