= Mohamed Hegazi =

Egyptian boxer (born 1961)

Personal information
- Nationality: Egyptian
- Born: 13 September 1961 (age 63)

Sport
- Sport: Boxing

Mohamed Hegazi (born 13 September 1961) is an Egyptian boxer. He competed at the 1984 Summer Olympics and the 1988 Summer Olympics.
