= Emil Chuprenski =

Bulgarian boxer

Personal information
- Born: 14 September 1960 Sofia, Bulgaria
- Died: 31 May 2025 (aged 64)
Medal record
Men's Boxing
Representing Bulgaria
World Amateur Championships
Bronze medal – third place	1986 Reno	Lightweight
European Amateur Championships
Gold medal – first place	1983 Varna	Lightweight
Gold medal – first place	1985 Budapest	Lightweight
Silver medal – second place	1987 Turin	Lightweight

Emil Todorov Chuprenski (Bulgarian: Емил Тодоров Чупренски; 14 September 1960 – 31 May 2025) was a boxer from Bulgaria who competed for his native country at the 1988 Summer Olympics in Seoul, South Korea. There he was defeated in the quarterfinals of the Men's Lightweight Division (– 60 kg) by USA's eventual bronze medalist Romallis Ellis. He was born in Sofia.
