= Giorgio Campanella =

Italian boxer

Personal information
- Nationality: Italian
- Born: 20 February 1970 (age 55); Crotone, Italy

Sport
- Sport: Boxing

Giorgio Campanella (born 20 February 1970) is an Italian former professional boxer who competed from 1990 to 2000, challenging three times for a world title between 1994 and 1998. As an amateur, he competed in the men's lightweight event at the 1988 Summer Olympics.
