= No decision =

Sports statistic

A no decision (sometimes written no-decision) is one of either of two sports statistics scenarios; one in baseball and softball, and the other in boxing and related combat sports.

== Baseball and softball ==
A starting pitcher who leaves a game without earning either a win or a loss is said to have received a no decision. Major League Baseball (MLB) rules specify that a starting pitcher, to earn a win, must pitch at least five innings, leaving the game with a lead that their team "does not relinquish". There is no innings requirement for a starting pitcher to earn a loss; it is simply that the pitcher allows a run that gives the winning team a lead they do not relinquish. When a starting pitcher does not earn a win or a loss, it is a no decision, and the outcome of the game does not affect the starting pitcher's win–loss record, as a relief pitcher will receive the win or loss.

Attributing wins, losses, and no decisions can be complex, such as when a starting pitcher leaves a game mid-inning with runners on base, as runs scored by those runners would still be considered the starting pitcher's responsibility. Further, if a starting pitcher leaves a game while losing (colloquially, that pitcher is said to be "on the hook"), they will receive a no decision if their team comes back to tie the score or take the lead, regardless of the outcome. Box scores for completed games indicate who the winning and losing pitchers are, as determined by the official scorer; the absence of a win or loss designation for a starting pitcher indicates a no decision.

=== Examples ===
Assume in these examples that each starting pitcher exits the game at the end of the 6th inning.

Example 1
Team	1	2	3	4	5	6	7	8	9	R	H	E
Red	4	0	0	0	0	0	0	1	0	5	5	0
Blue	0	0	0	0	0	0	0	0	4	4	4	0
WP: Red Starter LP: Blue Starter

Red Starter gets the win since, during the time that he or she was in the game, the Red team established a lead that was never relinquished. Conversely, Blue Starter gets the loss. While the run that provided the winning margin could be viewed as having been scored in the eighth inning, after both starters had left the game, the first-inning lead was never relinquished (the Red team was always in the lead).

Example 2
Team	1	2	3	4	5	6	7	8	9	R	H	E
Red	4	0	0	0	0	0	0	0	1	5	5	0
Blue	0	0	0	0	0	0	0	4	0	4	4	0
WP: Red Reliever LP: Blue Reliever

Red Starter and Blue Starter each get a no decision, as the 4–0 lead established in the first inning was later relinquished (at the end of the eighth inning, the score was tied).

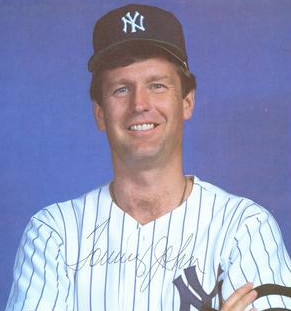
Tommy John had 188 no decisions during his MLB career.

The above examples highlight how events that happen after starting pitchers have left the game can affect whether they receive a decision (win or loss) or no decision. This is one reason that wins and losses are generally viewed by baseball statisticians as being an unreliable indicator of pitching effectiveness.

=== MLB records ===
In Major League Baseball (MLB), the record for the most no decisions by a starting pitcher in a single season (dating back to at least 1908) is 20, held by Bert Blyleven in 1979 and Zach Davies in 2022. Tommy John has the all-time record of 188 career no decisions. The starting staff of the 1918 Boston Red Sox recorded only three no decisions, the fewest of any MLB team dating back to at least 1908, while the fewest in a 162-game season is 16, by the 1980 Oakland Athletics. The record for most no decisions by a group of starting pitchers is 66, set by the 1993 Cleveland Indians.

== Boxing and related combat sports ==
Although uncommon in contemporary combat sports, except in white-collar boxing, a no decision (ND) occurs in some American jurisdictions on combat sports if a fight is stopped before the end of a certain amount of rounds due to an accidental headbutt or injury, as no winner is selected on points. In old times, such as the 19th century and the early 20th century, fights could be decided as no decisions if there was no knockout at the end of a pre-arranged or scheduled amount of rounds. This could be by law, to discourage gambling; by rules to discourage injury of amateurs; or by prearrangement of the fighters, to protect titles from sudden upsets. While this practice largely died out after the mid-20th century, it still occurred as late as the early 2000s in some smaller midwestern American jurisdictions like those in Oklahoma, as evidenced by the records of journeymen Buck Smith and Verdell Smith. This result should also not be confused with the unrelated contemporary term "no contest."
