= Reggie Strickland =

American boxer (born 1968)

Personal information
- Nickname: All-Time Great
- Nationality: American
- Born: 4 September 1968 (age 58) Cincinnati, Ohio, U.S.
- Weight: Super Middleweight

Boxing career
- Stance: Orthodox

Boxing record
- Total fights: 363
- Wins: 66
- Win by KO: 14
- Losses: 276
- Draws: 17
- No contests: 4

Reggie Strickland (born September 4, 1968) (aliases Reggie Buse and Reggie Raglin) is an American former professional boxer.

== Professional career ==
Strickland began his professional career in 1987. He was featured in an article in The New York Times, along with journeymen Buck Smith and Verdell Smith, detailing the life of a journeyman boxer, or tomato can. It was noted that in Strickland's many fights, he sometimes used aliases, including Reggie Buse and Reggie Raglin. The Wall Street Journal also referenced Strickland in a story about Kristian Laight, a British boxer who had fought 300 fighters.

Throughout his career he also fought future world champions Tavoris Cloud, Randall Bailey, Cory Spinks, Raúl Márquez and Keith Holmes.

== Professional boxing record ==
66 Wins (14 knockouts, 52 decisions), 276 Losses (25 knockouts, 251 decisions), 17 Draws, 4 No Contests
Result	Record	Opponent	Type	Round	Date	Location	Notes
Loss	66-276-17 (4)	(United States) Dante Craig	UD	6	10/15/2005	(United States) Grand Victoria Casino, Rising Sun, Indiana	
Loss	66-275-17 (4)	(Mexico) Daniel Pérez	UD	6	10/07/2005	(United States) Farm Bureau Building, Indianapolis, Indiana	
Loss	66-274-17 (4)	(United States) Daryl Salmon	UD	8	07/13/2005	(United States) Majestic Star Casino, Gary, Indiana	
Loss	66-273-17 (4)	(United States) Tavoris Cloud	UD	4	05/06/2005	(United States) Farm Bureau Building, Indianapolis, Indiana	
Loss	66-272-17 (4)	(United States) Saeed Hawkins	UD	4	03/01/2005	(United States) Pepsi Coliseum, Indianapolis, Indiana	
Loss	66-271-17 (4)	(United States) Ed Perry	UD	6	02/19/2005	(United States) Riehle Brothers Pavilion, Lafayette, Indiana	
Loss	66-270-17 (4)	(United States) Quentin Smith	UD	8	01/28/2005	(United States) Farm Bureau Building, Indianapolis, Indiana	
Loss	66-269-17 (4)	(United States) Butch Hajicek	UD	6	12/18/2004	(United States) Minnesota Sports Cafe, Fridley, Minnesota	
Loss	66-268-17 (4)	(United States) Troy Weida	UD	8	10/08/2004	(United States) Lakeside Casino, Osceola, Iowa	
Win	66-267-17 (4)	(United States) Tyrone Roberts	UD	6	09/30/2004	(United States) Prairie Meadows Racetrack, Altoona, Iowa	
Loss	65-267-17 (4)	(United States) Jeff Yeoman	UD	4	09/26/2004	(United States) Majestic Star Casino, Gary, Indiana	
Loss	65-266-17 (4)	(United States) Anthony Shuler	UD	6	09/18/2004	(United States) Riehle Brothers Pavilion, Lafayette, Indiana	
Loss	65-265-17 (4)	(United States) Jeff Baker	UD	6	09/10/2004	(United States) Farm Bureau Building, Indianapolis, Indiana	
Draw	65-264-17 (4)	(United States) Jimmy Holmes	MD	4	07/11/2004	(United States) Majestic Star Casino, Gary, Indiana	
Loss	65-264-16 (4)	(United States) Gregory Holmes	UD	4	06/25/2004	(United States) Genesis Center, Gary, Indiana	
Loss	65-263-16 (4)	(United States) James Butler	UD	6	05/07/2004	(United States) Farm Bureau Building, Indianapolis, Indiana	
Loss	65-262-16 (4)	(Haiti) Lenord Pierre	UD	6	04/30/2004	(United States) Hammond Civic Center, Hammond, Indiana	
Loss	65-261-16 (4)	(United States) Tracy Sneed	UD	6	04/17/2004	(United States) Comanche Casino, Lawton, Oklahoma	
Win	65-260-16 (4)	(United States) Toris Smith	TKO	5	04/06/2004	(United States) Omni New Daisy Theater, Memphis, Tennessee	Referee stopped the bout at the end of the fifth round.
Loss	64-260-16 (4)	(United States) Kendall Gould	UD	4	03/27/2004	(United States) Mohican North Star Casino, Bowler, Wisconsin	
Loss	64-259-16 (4)	(United States) Thomas Wilt	UD	6	03/18/2004	(United States) Columbia Club, Indianapolis, Indiana	
Draw	64-258-16 (4)	(United States) Robbie Tovar	PTS	8	03/02/2004	(United States) Pepsi Coliseum, Indianapolis, Indiana	NABC Great Lakes Super Middleweight title
Loss	64-258-15 (4)	(United States) Darnell Wilson	UD	6	02/07/2004	(United States) Riehle Brothers Pavilion, Lafayette, Indiana	
Loss	64-257-15 (4)	(United States) Chris Lytle	UD	6	02/03/2004	(United States) 8 Second Saloon, Indianapolis, Indiana	
Loss	64-256-15 (4)	(Guyana) Raul Frank	UD	8	01/30/2004	(United States) Farm Bureau Building, Indianapolis, Indiana	
Loss	64-255-15 (4)	(United States) Tim Pilant	UD	4	12/13/2003	(United States) Mid America All Indian Center, Council Bluffs, Iowa	
Win	64-254-15 (4)	(United States) Mike Wilson	TKO	1	11/29/2003	(United States) Boot Scootin' Bingo Parlor, Lafayette, Indiana	Referee stopped the bout at 1:45 of the first round.
Loss	63-254-15 (4)	(United States) Joe Hutchinson	UD	6	11/25/2003	(United States) Pepsi Coliseum, Indianapolis, Indiana	
Win	63-253-15 (4)	(United States) Anthony Lee Howard	TKO	3	11/15/2003	(United States) Hammond Civic Center, Hammond, Indiana	Referee stopped the bout at 1:13 of the third round.
Loss	62-253-15 (4)	(United States) Jonathan Corn	SD	8	10/18/2003	(United States) Seven Clans Casino, Red Lake, Minnesota	
Win	62-252-15 (4)	(United States) Mike Stone	TKO	5	09/26/2003	(United States) Farm Bureau Building, Indianapolis, Indiana	Referee stopped the bout at 0:11 of the fifth round.
Loss	61-252-15 (4)	(United States) Anthony Bonsante	UD	8	09/06/2003	(United States) Minnesota Sports Cafe, Fridley, Minnesota	
Loss	61-251-15 (4)	(United States) Warren Moore	UD	8	08/22/2003	(United States) McBride Hall, Gary, Indiana	NABC Super Middleweight title
Loss	61-250-15 (4)	(Uganda) Mohammed Kayongo	UD	6	07/25/2003	(United States) University of Minnesota Armory, Saint Paul, Minnesota	
Loss	61-249-15 (4)	(Democratic Republic of the Congo) Alex Bunema	UD	10	07/11/2003	(United States) Dixie Junior College, Saint George, Utah	
Loss	61-248-15 (4)	(United States) Randall Bailey	UD	8	05/17/2003	(United States) Hammond Civic Center, Hammond, Indiana	
Win	61-247-15 (4)	(United States) Anthony Lee Howard	UD	4	05/03/2003	(United States) Seven Clans Casino, Red Lake, Minnesota	
Win	60-247-15 (4)	(United States) Wayne Bogard	TKO	3	04/18/2003	(United States) Farm Bureau Building, Indianapolis, Indiana	Referee stopped the bout at 1:45 of the third round.
Loss	59-247-15 (4)	(United States) Warren Moore	UD	4	04/12/2003	(United States) Sportszone, Topeka, Kansas	
Loss	59-246-15 (4)	(United States) Nathan Martin	UD	5	04/05/2003	(United States) Sioux City Municipal Auditorium, Sioux City, Iowa	
Loss	59-245-15 (4)	(United States) Jason Parillo	UD	6	03/13/2003	(United States) Columbia Club, Indianapolis, Indiana	
Loss	59-244-15 (4)	(United States) Anthony Shuler	UD	6	03/06/2003	(United States) Farm Bureau Building, Indianapolis, Indiana	
Loss	59-243-15 (4)	(Mexico) Rocky Martinez	UD	6	02/25/2003	(United States) Pepsi Coliseum, Indianapolis, Indiana	
Win	59-242-15 (4)	(United States) Ray Shanks	TKO	4	02/22/2003	(United States) World War II Victory Museum, Auburn, Indiana	Referee stopped the bout at 1:58 of the fourth round.
Loss	58-242-15 (4)	(United States) Shannon Landberg	UD	8	02/15/2003	(United States) Zorah Shrine Temple, Terre Haute, Indiana	
Loss	58-241-15 (4)	(United States) Adrian Helms	UD	10	02/08/2003	(United States) Johanning Civic Center, Kokomo, Indiana	
Loss	58-240-15 (4)	(United States) Grover Wiley	UD	6	01/24/2003	(United States) Roy Wilkins Auditorium, Saint Paul, Minnesota	
Loss	58-239-15 (4)	(United States) Rubin Williams	UD	6	11/01/2002	(United States) Roy Wilkins Auditorium, Saint Paul, Minnesota	
Loss	58-238-15 (4)	(United States) Craig Cummings	UD	6	10/25/2002	(United States) Lakeside Casino, Osceola, Iowa	
Loss	58-237-15 (4)	(United States) James Webb	UD	4	10/12/2002	(United States) The Trap, Nashville, Tennessee	
Loss	58-236-15 (4)	(United States) Adrian Helms	UD	6	09/27/2002	(United States) Farm Bureau Building, Indianapolis, Indiana	
Loss	58-235-15 (4)	(United States) Leonard Townsend	UD	6	09/06/2002	(United States) Roy Wilkins Auditorium, Saint Paul, Minnesota	
Win	58-234-15 (4)	(United States) Conley Person	KO	6	06/28/2002	(United States) Farm Bureau Building, Indianapolis, Indiana	GBF Super Middleweight title
Win	57-234-15 (4)	(United States) Ed Lee Humes	PTS	4	06/22/2002	(United States) Expo Five Arena, Louisville, Kentucky	
Loss	56-234-15 (4)	(United States) Ronnie Warrior Jr.	MD	4	08/01/2001	(United States) Ameristar Casino, Kansas City, Missouri	
Win	56-233-15 (4)	(United States) Mike Cooley	SD	4	06/24/2001	(United States) Ameristar Casino, Council Bluffs, Iowa	
Loss	55-233-15 (4)	(United States) Boyd Davis	UD	6	06/16/2001	(United States) Treasure Island Casino, Red Wing, Minnesota	
Loss	55-232-15 (4)	(United States) Nick C. Cook	UD	6	04/28/2001	(United States) LaPorte Civic Center, LaPorte, Indiana	
Loss	55-231-15 (4)	(United States) Michael Davis	UD	8	04/24/2001	(United States) Indiana State Fairgrounds, Indianapolis, Indiana	
Loss	55-230-15 (4)	(United States) Ted Solheid	PTS	4	04/13/2001	(United States) Oakdale, Minnesota	
Loss	55-229-15 (4)	(United States) Eric Howard	PTS	6	04/07/2001	(United States) Jamestown, Tennessee	
Win	55-228-15 (4)	(United States) Scott Sala	TKO	9	02/21/2001	(United States) Columbia Club, Indianapolis, Indiana	Referee stopped the bout at the end of the ninth round.
Win	54-228-15 (4)	(United States) Scott Sala	UD	4	02/10/2001	(United States) Greensburg Jr. High, Greensburg, Indiana	
Loss	53-228-15 (4)	(United States) Shannon Landberg	UD	8	01/27/2001	(United States) Johanning Civic Center, Kokomo, Indiana	
Loss	53-227-15 (4)	(United States) Nick C. Cook	UD	8	12/16/2000	(United States) LaPorte Civic Center, LaPorte, Indiana	Indiana Light Heavyweight title
Win	53-226-15 (4)	(United States) Ruben Ruiz	UD	8	11/21/2000	(United States) Pepsi Coliseum, Indianapolis, Indiana	Indiana Super Middleweight title
Loss	52-226-15 (4)	(United States) Randy Eckmann	SD	4	10/13/2000	(United States) Harvey's Casino, Council Bluffs, Iowa	
Loss	52-225-15 (4)	(United States) Donnie Penelton	UD	8	10/03/2000	(United States) Farm Bureau Building, Indianapolis, Indiana	
Loss	52-224-15 (4)	(United States) John Long	UD	6	07/17/2000	(United States) Station Casino, Saint Charles, Missouri	
Loss	52-223-15 (4)	(United States) George Blades	UD	6	06/20/2000	(United States) Farm Bureau Building, Indianapolis, Indiana	
Loss	52-222-15 (4)	(United States) Rob Bleakley	PTS	6	06/06/2000	(United States) Memphis, Tennessee	
Loss	52-221-15 (4)	(United States) Charles Tanner	UD	8	05/26/2000	(United States) LaPorte Civic Center, LaPorte, Indiana	
Loss	52-220-15 (4)	(United States) Troy Speakman	PTS	4	04/27/2000	(United States) Club Dance, Reynoldsburg, Ohio	
Win	52-219-15 (4)	(United States) Myron Killibrew	UD	4	04/22/2000	(United States) Johanning Civic Center, Kokomo, Indiana	
Loss	51-219-15 (4)	(United States) Maurice Brantley	UD	8	04/05/2000	(United States) Station Casino, Kansas City, Missouri	
Win	51-218-15 (4)	(United States) Sean Crowdus	PTS	4	02/29/2000	(United States) Pepsi Coliseum, Indianapolis, Indiana	
NC	50-218-15 (4)	(United States) Joe Hutchinson	NC	4	02/24/2000	(United States) Columbia Club, Indianapolis, Indiana	
Win	50-218-15 (3)	(United States) Bobby Vinson	SD	4	01/29/2000	(United States) Zorah Shrine Temple, Terre Haute, Indiana	
Loss	49-218-15 (3)	(Ecuador) Fernando Zúñiga	UD	8	01/19/2000	(United States) Coyote's, Louisville, Kentucky	
Loss	49-217-15 (3)	(United States) Anton Robinson	UD	4	01/08/2000	(United States) Peel's Palace, Erlanger, Kentucky	
Loss	49-216-15 (3)	(United States) Anton Robinson	UD	6	12/01/1999	(United States) Coyote's, Louisville, Kentucky	
Loss	49-215-15 (3)	(United States) Charles Brewer	TKO	2	10/29/1999	(United States) Farm Bureau Building, Indianapolis, Indiana	Referee stopped the bout at 2:22 of the second round.
Win	49-214-15 (3)	(United States) Chris Rosenbalm	PTS	6	10/23/1999	(United States) Gallatin, Tennessee	
Loss	48-214-15 (3)	(United States) Jerry Brown	UD	8	10/02/1999	(United States) Casino Aztar, Kokomo, Indiana	Indiana Light Heavyweight title
Loss	48-213-15 (3)	(United States) Jose Spearman	UD	8	09/19/1999	(United States) Post Road Center, Indianapolis, Indiana	
Loss	48-212-15 (3)	(United States) Rich Boruff	UD	8	09/04/1999	(United States) Johanning Civic Center, Kokomo, Indiana	
Loss	48-211-15 (3)	(United States) Grover Wiley	UD	6	08/20/1999	(United States) Harvey's Casino, Council Bluffs, Iowa	
Loss	48-210-15 (3)	(United States) Billy Waltz	PTS	12	08/18/1999	(United States) Nashville, Tennessee	
Draw	48-209-15 (3)	(United States) Jeffrey Hemphill	PTS	4	08/16/1999	(United States) Louisville, Kentucky	
Loss	48-209-14 (3)	(United States) Damon Reed	UD	6	06/30/1999	(United States) Station Casino, Kansas City, Missouri	
Loss	48-208-14 (3)	(United States) Jerry Brown	SD	6	04/30/1999	(United States) Evansville, Indiana	
Loss	48-207-14 (3)	(United States) Ted Muller	UD	6	04/27/1999	(United States) Davenport, Iowa	
Loss	48-206-14 (3)	(United States) Jonathan Reid	PTS	6	03/20/1999	(United States) Gallatin, Tennessee	
Loss	48-205-14 (3)	(United States) Karl Willis	PTS	6	03/03/1999	(United States) Nashville, Tennessee	
Win	48-204-14 (3)	(United States) Tim Bryan	UD	8	03/02/1999	(United States) Pepsi Coliseum, Indianapolis, Indiana	
Loss	47-204-14 (3)	(United States) Harold Roberts	UD	4	02/24/1999	(United States) Station Casino, Kansas City, Missouri	
Win	47-203-14 (3)	(United States) Greg Fields	UD	4	02/20/1999	(United States) Johanning Civic Center, Kokomo, Indiana	
Loss	46-203-14 (3)	(United States) James Crawford	UD	8	02/10/1999	(United States) Meskwaki Casino, Tama, Iowa	
Loss	46-202-14 (3)	(United States) Sammy Sparkman	PTS	6	01/27/1999	(United States) Nashville, Tennessee	
Loss	46-201-14 (3)	(United States) Rich Boruff	SD	4	01/23/1999	(United States) Zorah Shrine Temple, Terre Haute, Indiana	
Loss	46-200-14 (3)	(United States) Lavell Finger	UD	6	01/15/1999	(United States) Fiesta Palace, Waukegan, Illinois	
Loss	46-199-14 (3)	(United States) Reggie Green	PTS	8	12/19/1998	(United States) Lincoln, Nebraska	
Loss	46-198-14 (3)	(Puerto Rico) Carlos Sanabria	UD	4	12/15/1998	(United States) Fifty Yard Line, Harvey, Illinois	
Win	46-197-14 (3)	(United States) Greg Fields	TKO	2	12/12/1998	(United States) Post Road Center, Indianapolis, Indiana	
NC	45-197-14 (3)	(United States) Tony Menefee	ND	6	12/01/1998	(United States) Remington's, Topeka, Kansas	
Loss	45-197-14 (2)	(United States) Donnie Penelton	SD	4	11/28/1998	(United States) Zorah Shrine Temple, Terre Haute, Indiana	
Win	45-196-14 (2)	(United States) Tim Bryan	UD	8	11/24/1998	(United States) Pepsi Coliseum, Indianapolis, Indiana	Indiana Super Middleweight title
Loss	44-196-14 (2)	(United States) Rico Cason	PTS	6	11/14/1998	(United States) Gallatin, Tennessee	
Loss	44-195-14 (2)	(United States) Derrick Harmon	TKO	2	10/08/1998	(United States) Harrah's Casino, Kansas City, Missouri	Referee stopped the bout at 2:54 of the second round.
Loss	44-194-14 (2)	(Colombia) Hugo Pineda	TKO	3	09/29/1998	(United States) Farm Bureau Building, Indianapolis, Indiana	
Loss	44-193-14 (2)	(Algeria) Mohamed Benguesmia	TKO	2	08/07/1998	(United States) Park West, Chicago, Illinois	
Loss	44-192-14 (2)	(United States) Boyd Davis	PTS	6	07/31/1998	(United States) Minneapolis, Minnesota	
Loss	44-191-14 (2)	(United States) Shannon Landberg	PTS	6	07/18/1998	(United States) Kokomo, Indiana	
Loss	44-190-14 (2)	(United States) Leonard Townsend	PTS	8	07/14/1998	(United States) Indianapolis, Indiana	
Draw	44-189-14 (2)	(United States) Hector Ramirez	PTS	10	06/18/1998	(United States) North Vernon, Indiana	
Draw	44-189-13 (2)	(United States) Brent Cooper	PTS	4	06/16/1998	(United States) Nashville, Tennessee	
Loss	44-189-12 (2)	(United States) Anton Robinson	PTS	6	06/10/1998	(United States) Louisville, Kentucky	
Loss	44-188-12 (2)	(Puerto Rico) Johnny Rivera-Montanez	UD	6	06/04/1998	(United States) The Showboat, East Chicago, Indiana	
Loss	44-187-12 (2)	(United States) Cory Spinks	UD	4	06/02/1998	(United States) The Ambassador, Saint Louis, Missouri	
Loss	44-186-12 (2)	(United States) Tony Menefee	SD	6	05/26/1998	(United States) Sac and Fox Casino, Powhattan, Kansas	
Loss	44-185-12 (2)	(United States) Lonnie Smith	UD	10	05/22/1998	(United States) Odeum Expo Center, Villa Park, Illinois	
Loss	44-184-12 (2)	(Italy) Francesco Cavalletti	UD	6	05/19/1998	(United States) Farm Bureau Building, Indianapolis, Indiana	
Loss	44-183-12 (2)	(United States) Michael Tucker	UD	4	05/12/1998	(United States) Flamingo Casino, Kansas City, Missouri	
Loss	44-182-12 (2)	(United States) Lawrence Chapman	PTS	4	05/05/1998	(United States) Nashville, Tennessee	
Loss	44-181-12 (2)	(United States) Jonathan Reid	DQ	3	04/30/1998	(United States) Columbia, Tennessee	
Loss	44-180-12 (2)	(United States) Anton Robinson	PTS	4	04/28/1998	(United States) Nashville, Tennessee	
Loss	44-179-12 (2)	(United States) Jerry Brown	PTS	4	04/18/1998	(United States) Owensboro, Kentucky	
Win	44-178-12 (2)	(United States) Darius Ashley	KO	2	04/16/1998	(United States) North Vernon, Indiana	
Loss	43-178-12 (2)	(United States) Sam Mahmoud	UD	4	04/07/1998	(United States) The Ambassador, Jennings, Missouri	
Loss	43-177-12 (2)	(United States) Purcell Miller	UD	8	04/04/1998	(United States) Johanning Civic Center, Kokomo, Indiana	
Draw	43-176-12 (2)	(United States) Michael Davis	PTS	4	03/31/1998	(United States) Nashville, Tennessee	
Loss	43-176-11 (2)	(United States) Leonard Walton	UD	4	03/28/1998	(United States) KC Market Center, Kansas City, Missouri	
Loss	43-175-11 (2)	(United States) Theo Elmore	PTS	4	03/24/1998	(United States) Nashville, Tennessee	
Loss	43-174-11 (2)	(United States) Dezi Ford	PTS	4	03/10/1998	(United States) Nashville, Tennessee	
Loss	43-173-11 (2)	(United States) Todd Foster	UD	8	03/05/1998	(United States) Coeur d'Alene Casino, Worley, Idaho	
Loss	43-172-11 (2)	(United States) John Williams	UD	8	02/25/1998	(United States) Columbia Club, Indianapolis, Indiana	
Loss	43-171-11 (2)	(United States) Tony Menefee	UD	6	02/23/1998	(United States) Remington's, Topeka, Kansas	
Win	43-170-11 (2)	(United States) Brent Cooper	PTS	4	02/17/1998	(United States) Nashville, Tennessee	
Loss	42-170-11 (2)	(United States) Tony Menefee	UD	4	02/05/1998	(United States) Harvey's Casino, Council Bluffs, Iowa	
Loss	42-169-11 (2)	(United States) Jimmy Hagar	PTS	4	02/03/1998	(United States) Nashville, Tennessee	
Win	42-168-11 (2)	(United States) Tom Gavin	PTS	4	01/27/1998	(United States) Nashville, Tennessee	
Loss	41-168-11 (2)	(United States) Jimmy Hagar	PTS	4	01/20/1998	(United States) Nashville, Tennessee	
Win	41-167-11 (2)	(United States) John Gutierrez	TKO	3	01/16/1998	(United States) Nashville, Tennessee	
Loss	40-167-11 (2)	(United States) Jimmy Hagar	PTS	4	12/23/1997	(United States) Nashville, Tennessee	
Loss	40-166-11 (2)	(United States) Theo Elmore	PTS	4	12/16/1997	(United States) Nashville, Tennessee	
Loss	40-165-11 (2)	(United States) Terrance Churchwell	PTS	4	12/02/1997	(United States) Nashville, Tennessee	
Loss	40-164-11 (2)	(United States) Kenny Bowman	PTS	4	11/18/1997	(United States) Nashville, Tennessee	
Loss	40-163-11 (2)	(United States) Theo Elmore	SD	10	11/04/1997	(United States) Nashville, Tennessee	
Loss	40-162-11 (2)	(United Kingdom) Delroy Leslie	PTS	6	10/14/1997	(United States) Nashville, Tennessee	
Loss	40-161-11 (2)	(United States) Kenny Ellis	PTS	10	10/11/1997	(United States) Peel's Palace, Erlanger, Kentucky	
Loss	40-160-11 (2)	(United States) Kelly Mays	PTS	4	10/09/1997	(United States) Louisville, Kentucky	
Loss	40-159-11 (2)	(United Kingdom) Delroy Leslie	PTS	4	10/07/1997	(United States) Nashville, Tennessee	
Loss	40-158-11 (2)	(Mexico) Angel Hernandez	UD	6	10/01/1997	(United States) Banana Joe's, Chicago, Illinois	
Loss	40-157-11 (2)	(United States) Shannon Landberg	UD	6	09/30/1997	(United States) Incahoots, Indianapolis, Indiana	
Loss	40-156-11 (2)	(United States) Warren Moore	UD	4	09/25/1997	(United States) The Showboat, East Chicago, Indiana	
Win	40-155-11 (2)	(United States) David Foster	PTS	4	09/23/1997	(United States) Nashville, Tennessee	
Draw	39-155-11 (2)	(United States) Jimmy Morgan	PTS	4	09/16/1997	(United States) Nashville Municipal Auditorium, Nashville, Tennessee	
Loss	39-155-10 (2)	(United States) Maurice Brantley	UD	6	09/15/1997	(United States) Argosy Casino, Kansas City, Missouri	
Loss	39-154-10 (2)	(United States) Manuel Lopez	PTS	6	08/21/1997	(United States) Denver, Colorado	
Loss	39-153-10 (2)	(United States) Eddie White	KO	1	05/30/1997	(United States) Ramada Inn, Rosemont, Illinois	
Loss	39-152-10 (2)	(United States) Earl Monroe	PTS	6	05/22/1997	(United States) Mobile, Alabama	
Loss	39-151-10 (2)	(United States) Jonathan Corn	PTS	8	05/15/1997	(United States) Green Bay, Wisconsin	
Loss	39-150-10 (2)	(United States) Robert West	PTS	8	05/10/1997	(United States) Circleville, Ohio	
Win	39-149-10 (2)	(United States) Brian Mitchell	UD	4	04/29/1997	(United States) Incahoots, Indianapolis, Indiana	
Win	38-149-10 (2)	(United States) Manuel Esparza	MD	4	04/19/1997	(United States) Highland High School, Anderson, Indiana	
Loss	37-149-10 (2)	(United States) Jason Curry	PTS	4	03/14/1997	(United States) River City Events Center, Fort Smith, Arkansas	
Draw	37-148-10 (2)	(Canada) Brooke Wellby	PTS	6	03/08/1997	(United States) Veteran's Coliseum, Cedar Rapids, Iowa	
Loss	37-148-9 (2)	Anthony Lockett	PTS	4	02/04/1997	(United States) Memphis, Tennessee	
Loss	37-147-9 (2)	Zack Brewster	PTS	4	01/28/1997	(United States) Kansas	
Loss	37-146-9 (2)	(Canada) Brooke Wellby	SD	6	01/18/1997	(United States) Veteran's Coliseum, Cedar Rapids, Iowa	
Loss	37-145-9 (2)	(United States) Tim Dendy	PTS	6	12/03/1996	(United States) Pyramid Arena, Memphis, Tennessee	
Loss	37-144-9 (2)	(United States) Jonathan Corn	PTS	6	10/25/1996	(United States) Hayward, Wisconsin	
Loss	37-143-9 (2)	(United States) Patrick Swann	DQ	6	10/12/1996	(United States) Albion Community Center, Albion, Iowa	
Loss	37-142-9 (2)	(United States) Richard Wilson Williams	PTS	4	09/29/1996	(United States) Louisville, Kentucky	
Loss	37-141-9 (2)	(Guyana) Tony Marshall	UD	10	09/20/1996	(United States) Erlanger, Kentucky	
Loss	37-140-9 (2)	(United States) Jesse Aquino	UD	4	08/12/1996	(United States) Beaumont Club, Kansas City, Missouri	
Loss	37-139-9 (2)	(United States) Randie Carver	UD	6	08/05/1996	(United States) Memorial Hall, Carthage, Missouri	
Loss	37-138-9 (2)	(United States) Jason Papillion	PTS	8	07/13/1996	(United States) Fort Smith, Arkansas	
Loss	37-137-9 (2)	(United States) Ron Essett	PTS	8	06/04/1996	(United States) Memphis, Tennessee	
Win	37–136–9 (2)	(United States) Steve Langley	PTS	6	05/18/1996	(United States) Bentonville, Arkansas	
Draw	36–136–9 (2)	(United States) Allen Smith	PTS	6	04/19/1996	(United States) Marriott Hotel, Des Moines, Iowa	
Loss	36–136–8 (2)	(United States) Ravea Springs	PTS	6	04/06/1996	(United States) Erlanger, Kentucky	
Loss	36–135–8 (2)	(United States) Nigel Reed	UD	6	04/02/1996	(United States) Memphis, Tennessee	
Loss	36–134–8 (2)	(United States) Lorenzo Smith	UD	6	03/05/1996	(United States) Memphis, Tennessee	
Win	36–133–8 (2)	(United States) Dwayne Swift	UD	6	03/01/1996	(United States) Louisville, Kentucky	
Win	35–133–8 (2)	(United States) Kenneth Kidd	UD	6	02/07/1996	(United States) Louisville, Kentucky	
Loss	34–133–8 (2)	(United States) Harold Roberts	UD	4	02/05/1996	(United States) Marriott Allis Plaza Hotel, Kansas City, Missouri	
Win	34–132–8 (2)	(United States) Larry Sutton	UD	4	01/20/1996	(United States) Erlanger, Kentucky	
Loss	33–132–8 (2)	(United States) Verdell Smith	UD	12	01/18/1996	(United States) Cain's Ballroom, Tulsa, Oklahoma	IBO Light Welterweight Title.
Loss	33–131–8 (2)	(United States) Buck Smith	PTS	8	12/19/1995	(United States) Oklahoma City, Oklahoma	
Loss	33–130–8 (2)	(United States) Ben Fielding	SD	6	12/13/1995	(United States) Youngstown, Ohio	
Loss	33–129–8 (2)	(United States) James Crawford	PTS	6	12/04/1995	(United States) Des Moines, Iowa	
Loss	33–128–8 (2)	(United States) Tyler Hughes	PTS	8	11/02/1995	(United States) Grand Island, Nebraska	
Loss	33–127–8 (2)	(United States) Arthur Allen	PTS	8	10/18/1995	(United States) Pittsburgh, Pennsylvania	
Draw	33–126–8 (2)	(United States) Mike Serr	PTS	6	09/16/1995	(United States) Mandan, North Dakota	
Loss	33–126–7 (2)	(United States) Clem Tucker Jr.	PTS	6	09/10/1995	(United States) Treasure Island Casino, Red Wing, Minnesota	
Win	33–125–7 (2)	(United States) Eugene George	PTS	5	08/19/1995	(United States) Cedar Rapids, Iowa	
Loss	32–125–7 (2)	(United States) Buck Smith	PTS	6	08/03/1995	(United States) Omaha, Nebraska	
Loss	32–124–7 (2)	(United States) Darrin Wagner	PTS	6	07/14/1995	(United States) Rochester, Minnesota	
Win	32–123–7 (2)	(United States) Rob Bleakley	PTS	6	07/11/1995	(United States) Kentucky	
Draw	31–123–7 (2)	Jay McMillan	PTS	6	06/26/1995	(United States) Kentucky	
Win	31–123–6 (2)	(United States) Kenneth Kidd	PTS	6	06/06/1995	(United States) Memphis, Tennessee	
Draw	30–123–6 (2)	(United States) Tyrone Moore	PTS	8	06/05/1995	(United States) Louisville, Kentucky	
Loss	30–123–5 (2)	(Brazil) Luciano Torres	KO	10	04/24/1995	Ribeirão Preto, Brazil	
Loss	30–122–5 (2)	(Canada) Syd Vanderpool	PTS	8	04/06/1995	(United States) Erie, Pennsylvania	
Loss	30–121–5 (2)	(United States) Manning Galloway	PTS	6	03/29/1995	(United States) Shoemaker Center, Cincinnati	
Loss	30–120–5 (2)	(United States) Frank Minton	PTS	6	03/28/1995	(United States) Louisville, Kentucky	
Win	30–119–5 (2)	(United States) Felix Dubray	SD	4	03/13/1995	(United States) Lincoln, Nebraska	
Loss	29–119–5 (2)	(United States) Buck Smith	PTS	6	03/05/1995	(United States) Muskogee Civic Assembly Center, Muskogee, Oklahoma	
Loss	29–118–5 (2)	(United States) Harold Brazier	PTS	8	02/28/1995	(United States) Indianapolis, Indiana	
Loss	29–117–5 (2)	(United States) Lemark Davis	UD	8	02/18/1995	(United States) Toledo, Ohio	
Win	29–116–5 (2)	(United States) Richard Wilson Williams	PTS	6	02/13/1995	(United States) Louisville, Kentucky	
Win	28–116–5 (2)	(United States) Steve Langley	PTS	8	02/07/1995	(United States) Grand Island, Nebraska	
Loss	27–116–5 (2)	(United States) Tyrone Moore	UD	8	01/24/1995	(United States) Fort Mitchell, Kentucky	
Win	27–115–5 (2)	(United States) Tony Enna	PTS	6	12/13/1994	(United States) Kentucky	
Loss	26–115–5 (2)	(United States) Clem Tucker Jr.	PTS	6	12/06/1994	(United States) Memphis, Tennessee	
Loss	26–114–5 (2)	(United States) Tyrone Moore	PTS	6	12/01/1994	(United States) Louisville, Kentucky	
Draw	26–113–5 (2)	(United States) Sam Wilson	PTS	5	11/19/1994	(United States) Richmond, Kentucky	
Loss	26–113–4 (2)	(United States) Buck Smith	UD	6	11/03/1994	(United States) Capitol Plaza Hotel, Jefferson City, Missouri	
Loss	26–112–4 (2)	(United States) Dennis Allen	PTS	8	10/18/1994	(United States) Mandan, North Dakota	
Win	26–111–4 (2)	(United States) Jay Clark	PTS	6	10/27/1994	(United States) Niles, Ohio	
Loss	25–111–4 (2)	(United States) Anwar Oshana	UD	4	10/13/1994	(United States) Rialto Square Theatre, Joliet, Illinois	
Loss	25–110–4 (2)	(United States) Dan Connolly	PTS	8	10/06/1994	(United States) Monroeville, Pennsylvania	
Loss	25–109–4 (2)	(United States) Buck Smith	PTS	6	09/17/1994	(United States) Des Moines, Iowa	
Win	25–108–4 (2)	(United States) Jay Clark	UD	4	08/27/1994	(United States) Veteran's Coliseum, Cedar Rapids, Iowa	
Win	24–108–4 (2)	(United States) Kenny Willis	SD	6	08/15/1994	(United States) Fort Mitchell, Kentucky	
Loss	23–108–4 (2)	(United States) Tony Menefee	PTS	8	08/04/1994	(United States) Council Bluffs, Iowa	
Loss	23–107–4 (2)	(United States) Cecil Pettigrew	DQ	8	07/22/1994	(United States) Brady Theater, Tulsa, Oklahoma	
Win	23–106–4 (2)	(United States) Kevin Phillips	PTS	6	06/27/1994	(United States) Fort Mitchell, Kentucky	
Win	22–106–4 (2)	(United States) Charlie Negrete	PTS	6	06/16/1994	(United States) Des Moines, Iowa	
Win	21–106–4 (2)	(United States) Kevin Phillips	PTS	6	06/11/1994	(United States) South Bend, Indiana	
NC	20–106–4 (2)	(United States) Tony Enna	ND	8	05/24/1994	(United States) Saint Louis, Missouri	
Win	20–106–4 (1)	(United States) Tony Enna	PTS	6	05/21/1994	(United States) Louisville, Kentucky	
Loss	19–106–4 (1)	(United States) Harold Brazier	PTS	8	05/16/1994	(United States) Louisville, Kentucky	
Loss	19–105–4 (1)	(United States) Ray Domenge	PTS	6	05/12/1994	(United States) Omaha, Nebraska	
Loss	19–104–4 (1)	(United States) Gary Kirkland	PTS	8	05/06/1994	(United States) Terre Haute, Indiana	
Loss	19–103–4 (1)	(United States) Tony Enna	PTS	6	05/02/1994	(United States) Kansas City, Kansas	
Draw	19–102–4 (1)	(United States) Tony Enna	PTS	6	04/28/1994	(United States) Springfield, Missouri	
Loss	19–102–3 (1)	(United States) Terrence Kelly	PTS	6	04/26/1994	(United States) Louisville, Kentucky	
Loss	19–101–3 (1)	(United States) Alex Ramos	PTS	8	04/25/1994	(United States) Des Moines, Iowa	
Loss	19–100–3 (1)	(United States) Rob Bleakley	PTS	10	04/16/1994	(United States) Spencer, Iowa	
Win	19–99–3 (1)	(United States) Mark Brannon	PTS	6	04/12/1994	(United States) Kansas City, Missouri	
Loss	18–99–3 (1)	(United States) Rob Bleakley	UD	6	04/11/1994	(United States) Louisville, Kentucky	
Loss	18–98–3 (1)	(United States) Rob Bleakley	PTS	8	04/07/1994	(United States) Council Bluffs, Iowa	
Loss	18–97–3 (1)	(United States) Marty Jakubowski	PTS	6	04/05/1994	(United States) Memphis, Tennessee	
Win	18–96–3 (1)	(United States) Marty Wolfe	PTS	6	04/02/1994	(United States) Manchester, Kentucky	
Loss	17–96–3 (1)	(United States) Ricky Ramirez	PTS	4	03/19/1994	(United States) Des Moines, Iowa	
Draw	17–95–3 (1)	(United States) Justin Racine	PTS	6	03/06/1994	(United States) North Dakota	
Loss	17–95–2 (1)	(United States) Raúl Márquez	TKO	1	01/14/1994	(United States) Chicago, Illinois	
Loss	17–94–2 (1)	(United States) Leonard Townsend	UD	6	12/17/1993	(United States) Union Hall, Countryside, Illinois	
Loss	17–93–2 (1)	(United States) Keith Holmes	UD	8	12/02/1993	(United States) Louisville, Kentucky	
Win	17–92–2 (1)	(United States) Kenny Brown	PTS	6	11/13/1993	(United States) Greensburg, Indiana	
Draw	16-92–2 (1)	(United States) Pat Briceno	PTS	6	11/05/1993	(United States) Melrose Park Civic Center, Melrose Park, Illinois	
Loss	16-92–1 (1)	(United States) Rob Bleakley	UD	12	10/30/1993	(United States) Veteran's Coliseum, Cedar Rapids, Iowa	
Loss	16-91–1 (1)	(United States) Marty Jakubowski	PTS	6	10/27/1993	(United States) Wichita, Kansas	
Draw	16-90–1 (1)	(United States) Terry Lee Thomas	PTS	4	10/23/1993	(United States) Indianapolis, Indiana	
Win	16–90 (1)	(United States) Aaron McLaurine	PTS	6	10/22/1993	(United States) Kentucky	
Loss	15–90 (1)	(United States) Rob Bleakley	PTS	4	10/18/1993	(United States) Kentucky	
Loss	15–89 (1)	(United States) Harold Roberts	PTS	4	10/16/1993	(United States) Bristol, Tennessee	
Loss	15–88 (1)	(United States) Harold Brazier	PTS	10	10/07/1993	(United States) Iowa	
Loss	15–87 (1)	(United States) Marty Jakubowski	UD	6	10/04/1993	(United States) Marriott Downtown, Kansas City, Missouri	
Loss	15–86 (1)	(United States) TD Wortham	PTS	10	10/01/1993	(United States) Continental Inn, Lexington, Kentucky	
Loss	15–85 (1)	(United States) Leonard Townsend	PTS	6	09/17/1993	(United States) Union Hall, Countryside, Illinois	
Loss	15–84 (1)	(United States) Tim Payton	PTS	6	09/13/1993	(United States) Kentucky	
Win	15–83 (1)	(United States) Todd McMurrin	PTS	4	09/11/1993	(United States) Waubeek, Iowa	
Win	14–83 (1)	(United States) Gerald Reed	PTS	4	08/09/1993	(United States) Louisville, Kentucky	
Win	13–83 (1)	(United States) Dave Traynor	PTS	4	08/05/1993	(United States) Council Bluffs, Iowa	
Win	12–83 (1)	(United States) Richie White	PTS	4	08/04/1993	(United States) Des Moines, Iowa	
Loss	11–83 (1)	(United States) Justin Racine	PTS	6	06/26/1993	(United States) Dillon, Montana	
Loss	11–82 (1)	(United States) Dave Traynor	SD	4	06/17/1993	(United States) Council Bluffs, Iowa	
Loss	11–81 (1)	(United States) Heath Todd	PTS	6	06/16/1993	(United States) Marriott Downtown, Kansas City, Kansas	
Loss	11–80 (1)	(United States) Terry Acker	PTS	8	05/15/1993	(United States) Bessemer Civic Center, Bessemer, Alabama	
Loss	11–79 (1)	(United States) Tony Menefee	TKO	4	05/01/1993	(United States) Lincoln, Nebraska	
Loss	11–78 (1)	(United States) Harold Brazier	PTS	8	04/29/1993	(United States) Elkhart, Indiana	
Win	11–77 (1)	(United States) Jim Kaczmarek	UD	5	04/21/1993	(United States) Louisville, Kentucky	
Loss	10–77 (1)	(United States) Gary Kirkland	PTS	6	04/13/1993	(United States) Hammond, Indiana	
Loss	10–76 (1)	(United States) Tony Enna	PTS	4	04/12/1993	(United States) Marriott Downtown, Kansas City, Missouri	
Loss	10–75 (1)	(United States) Clayton Williams	UD	4	04/10/1993	(United States) Lewistown, Montana	
Win	10–74 (1)	(United States) George Albert Reedy	UD	4	04/07/1993	(United States) Louisville, Kentucky	
Loss	9–74 (1)	(United States) Kenny Willis	PTS	6	03/31/1993	(United States) Louisville, Kentucky	
Loss	9–73 (1)	(United States) Chris Snyder	PTS	8	03/28/1993	(United States) Metroplex Hotel, Youngstown, Ohio	
Loss	9–72 (1)	(United States) Tony Ray Kern	UD	5	03/10/1993	(United States) Louisville, Kentucky	
Loss	9–71 (1)	(United States) Tim Payton	SD	6	03/05/1993	(United States) Louisville, Kentucky	
Loss	9–70 (1)	(United States) Marty Jakubowski	UD	8	03/03/1993	(United States) Louisville, Kentucky	
Win	9–69 (1)	(United States) Jason Quillen	UD	4	02/02/1993	(United States) Somerset, Kentucky	
Loss	8–69 (1)	(United States) Tim Payton	PTS	8	02/24/1993	(United States) Kentucky	
Loss	8–68 (1)	(United States) Justin Racine	PTS	6	02/19/1993	(United States) Mandan, North Dakota	
Win	8–67 (1)	(United States) Ben Tafari	PTS	4	02/17/1993	(United States) Louisville, Kentucky	
Loss	7–67 (1)	(United States) Shannon Landberg	PTS	6	02/10/1993	(United States) Louisville, Kentucky	
Loss	7–66 (1)	(United States) Bobby Amsler	UD	6	02/06/1993	(United States) Bristol, Tennessee	
Loss	7–65 (1)	(United States) Vinny Letizia	KO	3	11/25/1992	(United States) Countryside, Illinois	Strickland knocked out at 2:43 of the third round.
Loss	7–64 (1)	(United States) Tocker Pudwill	PTS	8	11/21/1992	(United States) Mandan, North Dakota	
Loss	7–63 (1)	(United States) Bobby Amsler	MD	6	10/27/1992	(United States) Century Center, South Bend, Indiana	
Loss	7–62 (1)	(Italy) Giovanni Nardiello	PTS	6	10/03/1992	(Italy) Palaghiaccio de Marino, Marino, Lazio	
Loss	7–61 (1)	(United States) Heath Todd	KO	4	08/17/1992	(United States) Allis Plaza Hotel, Kansas City, Missouri	
Loss	7–60 (1)	(United States) Roni Martinez	UD	4	08/14/1992	(United States) Lexington, Kentucky	
Loss	7–59 (1)	(United States) Jeff Johnson	PTS	6	08/08/1992	(United States) Demopolis, Alabama	
Loss	7–58 (1)	(United States) Wendell Hall	DQ	6	07/31/1992	(United States) Lexington, Kentucky	
Loss	7–57 (1)	(United States) Jeff Whaley	PTS	4	07/24/1992	(United States) Lexington, Kentucky	
Loss	7–56 (1)	(United States) Wendell Hall	MD	4	07/10/1992	(United States) Lexington, Kentucky	
Win	7–55 (1)	(United States) Pat Johnson	PTS	6	06/14/1992	(United States) Columbus, Indiana	
Loss	6–55 (1)	(United States) Availeo Slate	PTS	4	06/12/1992	(United States) Columbus, Ohio	
Loss	6–54 (1)	(United States) Robert Curry	PTS	6	06/11/1992	(United States) Beckley, West Virginia	
Loss	6–53 (1)	(United States) Robert Briggs	UD	8	05/29/1992	(United States) Struthers, Ohio	
Loss	6–52 (1)	(United States) Guy Stanford	PTS	4	05/23/1992	(United States) Hendersonville, Tennessee	
Loss	6–51 (1)	(United States) Larry LaCoursiere	PTS	10	05/03/1992	(United States) Columbus, Indiana	
Loss	6–50 (1)	(United States) Carlton Haywood	PTS	6	04/24/1992	(United States) Atlanta	
Loss	6–49 (1)	(United States) Darryl Lattimore	TKO	4	04/18/1992	(United States) George Washington Junior High, Alexandria, Virginia	
Loss	6–48 (1)	(United States) Jeff Johnson	PTS	8	02/28/1992	(United States) Decatur, Georgia	
Win	6–47 (1)	Ken Jackson	TKO	2	02/26/1992	(United States) Kentucky	
Loss	5–47 (1)	(United States) Matthew Charleston	PTS	10	01/11/1992	(United States) Nashville, Tennessee	
Loss	5–46 (1)	Mark Daniels	UD	6	01/06/1992	(United States) Saint Louis, Missouri	
NC	5–45 (1)	(United States) James Lonaker	ND	5	12/18/1991	(United States) Columbus, Indiana	
Loss	5–45	(United States) Mike Evgen	PTS	6	12/16/1991	(United States) Minneapolis, Minnesota	
Loss	5–44	(United States) Don Wilford	UD	6	12/07/1991	(United States) Nashville, Tennessee	
Win	5–43	(United States) Jack McGlathin	KO	2	10/26/1991	(United States) Indianapolis, Indiana	
Loss	4–43	(United States) Matthew Charleston	PTS	8	10/24/1991	(United States) Decatur, Georgia	
Loss	4–42	(United States) James Lonaker	TKO	8	09/14/1991	(United States) Columbus, Indiana	
Loss	4–41	(United States) Jim Combs	KO	1	07/20/1991	(United States) Oakdale, Louisiana	
Loss	4–40	(United States) Anthony Stephens	TKO	3	07/12/1991	(United States) Minneapolis, Minnesota	
Loss	4–39	Terry Guthrie	PTS	4	05/24/1991	(United States) Carthage, Missouri	
Loss	4–38	(United States) Shane Lanham	PTS	4	03/25/1991	(United States) Kentucky	
Loss	4–37	(United States) Gary Kirkland	PTS	4	03/08/1991	(United States) Hammond Civic Center, Hammond, Indiana	
Loss	4–36	(United States) Jim Kaczmarek	SD	4	02/25/1991	(United States) Century Center, South Bend, Indiana	
Loss	4–35	(United States) Brian Keith Brown	PTS	6	12/28/1990	(United States) Lexington, Kentucky	
Win	4–34	(United States) Tim Brown	UD	4	11/14/1990	(United States) Diamond's, Lexington, Kentucky	
Loss	3–34	(United States) Randy Cross	TKO	1	10/19/1990	(United States) Saint Louis, Missouri	Referee stopped the bout at 2:49 of the first round.
Loss	3–33	(United States) Shane Lanham	PTS	4	10/06/1990	(United States) Murray, Kentucky	
Loss	3–32	(United States) Michael Dann Taylor	PTS	4	09/20/1990	(United States) Elkhart, Indiana	
Loss	3–31	(United States) Mickle Orr	PTS	4	09/18/1990	(United States) Indianapolis, Indiana	
Win	3–30	(United States) Albert Grady	SD	6	09/14/1990	(United States) Beloit, Wisconsin	
Loss	2–30	(United States) Pat Coleman	UD	4	09/12/1990	(United States) Gateway Theatre, Chicago, Illinois	
Loss	2–29	(United States) John Lark	TKO	2	06/15/1990	(United States) Scott County Middle School, Georgetown, Kentucky	
Loss	2–28	(United States) Jeff Bumpus	UD	6	06/11/1990	(United States) Century Center, South Bend, Indiana	
Loss	2–27	(United States) Kenny Brown	UD	4	05/22/1990	(United States) Sherwood Club, Indianapolis, Indiana	
Loss	2–26	(United States) Shane Lanham	DQ	4	05/11/1990	(United States) Covington, Kentucky	
Loss	2–25	(United States) Bruce Nuby	PTS	8	03/16/1990	(United States) Covington, Kentucky	
Loss	2–24	(United States) Kenny Brown	PTS	5	02/27/1990	(United States) Indianapolis, Indiana	
Loss	2–23	(United States) Terry Lee Thomas	UD	8	02/13/1990	(United States) Sherwood Club, Indianapolis, Indiana	
Loss	2–22	(United States) Kelvin Williams	TKO	3	12/05/1989	(United States) Park West, Chicago, Illinois	Referee stopped the bout at 2:43 of the third round.
Loss	2–21	(United States) Mike Garrow	PTS	4	11/22/1989	(United States) Sheraton Hotel, Pittsburgh, Pennsylvania	
Loss	2–20	(United States) Rodney Wilson	UD	6	11/10/1989	(United States) Chicago International Amphitheatre, Chicago, Illinois	
Loss	2–19	(United States) Parrish Johnson	TKO	3	09/30/1989	(United States) La Vergne, Tennessee	
Loss	2–18	(United States) Parrish Johnson	PTS	4	08/31/1989	(United States) Memphis, Tennessee	
Loss	2–17	(United States) Eric Whitfield	TKO	4	08/26/1989	(United States) Murray, Kentucky	
Loss	2–16	(United States) Rodney Wilson	KO	2	06/06/1989	(United States) Park West, Chicago, Illinois	
Loss	2–15	(United States) Willie Ball	TKO	1	06/05/1989	(United States) Henry VIII Hotel, Saint Louis, Missouri	
Loss	2–14	(United States) Tim Brown	SD	4	05/22/1989	(United States) Yankee Doodle's, Bowling Green, Kentucky	
Loss	2–13	(United States) John Lark	PTS	4	05/18/1989	(United States) Hyatt Hotel, Lexington, Kentucky	
Loss	2–12	(United States) Terry Southerland	DQ	1	05/08/1989	(United States) Erlanger, Kentucky	
Loss	2–11	(United States) Lorenzo Smith	UD	4	05/02/1989	(United States) Park West, Chicago	
Loss	2–10	(United States) Tracy Muse	UD	6	04/26/1989	(United States) La Fontaine Bleue, Glen Burnie, Maryland	
Win	2–9	(United States) Willard Johnson	PTS	4	04/15/1989	(United States) Louisville, Kentucky	
Loss	1–9	(United States) James Sudberry	PTS	4	03/07/1989	(United States) Erlanger, Kentucky	
Loss	1–8	(United States) Matthew Thompson	PTS	4	11/12/1988	(United States) Bristol Sports Arena, Bristol, Tennessee	
Loss	1–7	(United States) Roland Commings	TKO	2	11/18/1987	(United States) Maronite Center, Youngstown, Ohio	Referee stopped the bout at 2:51 of the second round.
Loss	1–6	(Canada) Alain Langlois	KO	2	10/14/1987	(Canada) Toronto	
Loss	1–5	(United States) Tom Tipton	PTS	4	07/31/1987	(United States) Sadowski Field House, Fort Knox, Kentucky	
Loss	1–4	(Canada) Remo Di Carlo	TKO	2	06/23/1987	(Canada) Concert Hall, Toronto, Ontario	Referee stopped the bout at 1:59 of the second round.
Loss	1–3	(United States) Sammy Rivera	TKO	2	05/09/1987	(United States) Bristol, Tennessee	
Loss	1–2	(United States) Mark Brannon	UD	4	04/29/1987	(United States) National Guard Armory, Richmond, Kentucky	
Win	1–1	Thomas Burton	TKO	3	03/28/1987	(United States) Newport, Kentucky	
Loss	0–1	(United States) Ellery Thomas	UD	4	01/06/1987	(United States) Premier Center, Sterling Heights, Michigan	33-40, 34-40, 34-40.

Preceded by Incumbent	USA Indiana State Super Middleweight Champion; November 24, 1998 – December 16, 2000; Vacated	Vacant Title next held by Charles Tanner
Vacant Title last held by Shannon Landberg	GBF Super Middleweight Champion; June 28, 2002–2005; Retired	Incumbent
