= Marcus Oliveira =

American boxer

- Born: Marcus Derwin Oliveira; March 18, 1979 (age 47); Keshena, Wisconsin
- Nationality: (United States) American
- Height: 1.85 m (6 ft 1 in)
- Weight: 174.0 lb (78.9 kg; 12.43 st)
- Division: Light Heavyweight; Cruiserweight
- Stance: Orthodox
- Years active: 2006–present

Professional boxing record
- Total: 37
- Wins: 28
- By knockout: 22
- Losses: 8
- By knockout: 1
- Draws: 1

Amateur boxing record
- Total: 223
- Wins: 200
- Losses: 23

Other information
- Notable school: Haskell Indian Nations University
- Boxing record from BoxRec
- Last updated on: October 17, 2009

Marcus Oliveira (born March 18, 1979) is a Menominee light heavyweight professional boxer fighting out of Lawrence, Kansas.

== Professional career ==
Oliveira made his professional debut with a knockout win against Daniel Russell in April 2006. Oliveira would win his first six bouts by knockout, five of them in the first round. In February 2007 Mike Word became the first opponent to last the distance with Oliveira. June 2007 saw Oliveira defeat an opponent with a winning record for the first time, as he defeated 179–18–2 Buck Smith by TKO in round 2. Oliveira's first non-winning result was a split draw with 15–1–1 Nick Cook in February 2008, a fight for the vacant USBC light heavyweight title. Oliveira would take a major step forward with a dramatic come-from-behind win against undefeated prospect (8–0 with 8 knockouts) Phil Williams. In that fight Oliveira was knocked down twice but rallied to knock Williams out in the seventh round. In January 2009 Oliveira defeated veteran Rayco Saunders by majority decision. Oliveira defeated Otis Griffin by second-round knockout on June 5, 2009 at Grand Casino Hinckley in Minnesota.

== Professional boxing record ==
37 fights	28 wins	8 losses
By knockout	22	1
By decision	6	7
Draws	1	

No.	Result	Record	Opponent	Type	Round, time	Date	Location	Notes
37	Loss	28–8–1	(United States) Demetrius Banks	MD	6	Jun 25, 2022	(United States) Ho-Chunk Gaming, Wittenberg, Wisconsin	
36	Loss	28–7–1	(Haiti) Al Sands	KO	2 (8)	Feb 18, 2022	(United States) Grand Casino, Hinckley, Minnesota	For the ABF USA Cruiserweight Title
35	Loss	28–6–1	(United States) J'Leon Love	UD	8	Dec 18, 2021	(United States) Amalie Arena, Tampa, Florida	
34	Win	28–5–1	(United States) Dennis Morris	UD	8	Sep 4, 2021	(United States) Tripoli Shrine Center, Milwaukee, Wisconsin	
33	Win	27–5–1	(United States) Justin Ridgway	TKO	5 (8), 1:42	Jun 19, 2021	(United States) Civic Center, Neosho, Missouri	
32	Loss	26–5–1	(United States) Frankie Lopez	SD	8	Jun 22, 2019	(United States) Ho-Chunk Gaming, Wittenberg, Wisconsin	
31	Loss	26–4–1	(United States) DeShon Webster	UD	8	Apr 20, 2019	(United States) Douglas County Fairgrounds, Lawrence, Kansas	For vacant USA Midwest Cruiserweight Title
30	Loss	26–3–1	(Cuba) Ramon Luis Nicolas	UD	8	Jun 4, 2016	(United States) Wisconsin Center, Milwaukee, Wisconsin	
29	Loss	26–2–1	(United States) Cornelius White	MD	10	Oct 17, 2015	(United States) Black Bear Casino, Carlton, Minnesota	For vacant USBA Light Heavyweight Title
28	Win	26–1–1	(Colombia) Dionisio Miranda	KO	3 (8), 0:33	Aug 29, 2015	(United States) Aldrich Arena, Maplewood, Minnesota	
27	Loss	25–1–1	(Germany) Jürgen Brähmer	UD	12	Dec 14, 2013	Jahnsportforum, Neubrandenburg, Mecklenburg-Vorpommern, Germany	For vacant WBA (Regular) Light Heavyweight Title
26	Win	25–0–1	(United States) Ryan Coyne	TKO	11 (12), 1:15	Apr 12, 2013	(United States) Treasure Island Casino, Paradise, Nevada	
25	Win	24–0–1	(Bolivia) Ricky Torrez	TKO	1 (10), 2:41	Oct 27, 2012	Parque Naciones Unidas, Caracas, Venezuela	Won vacant WBA Fedebol Light Heavyweight Title
24	Win	23–0–1	(United States) Antwun Echols	TKO	3 (8), 2:01	Jan 28, 2012	(United States) Meninomee Resort Casino, Menominee, Wisconsin	
23	Win	22–0–1	(United States) Chris Eppley	TKO	4 (6), 1:16	Nov 5, 2011	(United States) Seminole Hard Rock Hotel and Casino, Hollywood, Florida	
22	Win	21–0–1	(United States) Demetrius Jenkins	UD	6	Jan 29, 2011	(United States) Silverdome, Pontiac, Michigan	
21	Win	20–0–1	(United States) James Morrow	TKO	1 (8), 2:16	Jul 17, 2010	(United States) 4 Bears Casino & Lodge, New Town, North Dakota	
20	Win	19–0–1	(United States) Otis Griffin	KO	2 (8), 2:25	Jun 5, 2009	(United States) Grand Casino, Hinckley, Minnesota	
19	Win	18–0–1	(United States) Isaiah Henderson	TKO	2 (6)	May 15, 2009	(United States) Comanche Nation Casino, Lawton, Oklahoma	
18	Win	17–0–1	(United States) Rayco Saunders	MD	8	Jan 24, 2009	(United States) Grand Casino, Hinckley, Minnesota	
17	Win	16–0–1	(United States) Kelvin Davis	TKO	3 (6), 0:59	Oct 25, 2008	(United States) Township Auditorium, Columbia, South Carolina	
16	Win	15–0–1	(United States) Phil Williams	KO	7 (8)	Aug 29, 2008	(United States) Grand Casino, Hinckley, Minnesota	
15	Win	14–0–1	(United States) Leo Pla	TKO	5 (6), 2:02	Jun 20, 2008	(United States) Landon Arena, Topeka, Kansas	
14	Win	13–0–1	(United States) Roy Hughes	TKO	1 (6), 1:21	Feb 21, 2008	(United States) Kansas Expocentre, Topeka, Kansas	
13	Draw	12–0–1	(United States) Nick Cook	PTS	10	Feb 9, 2008	(United States) Civic Auditorium, La Porte, Indiana	
12	Win	12–0	(United States) Mike Word	UD	6	Nov 23, 2007	(United States) Ramada Inn, Topeka, Kansas	
11	Win	11–0	(United States) Matt Gockel	TKO	3 (6), 2:33	Sep 29, 2007	(United States) Harrah's Hotel & Casino, North Kansas City, Missouri	
10	Win	10–0	(United States) Buck Smith	TKO	2 (4), 2:16	Jun 30, 2007	(United States) Ramada Inn, Topeka, Kansas	
9	Win	9–0	(United States) Rodney Moore	TKO	3 (6), 1:08	May 11, 2007	(United States) Clearwater River Casino, Lewiston, Idaho	
8	Win	8–0	(United States) Leo Pla	UD	4	Apr 13, 2007	(United States) Kansas Expocentre, Topeka, Kansas	
7	Win	7–0	(United States) Mike Word	MD	4	Feb 3, 2007	(United States) Ramada Inn, Topeka, Kansas	
6	Win	6–0	(United States) Bertis McMillan	KO	1 (4), 0:24	Nov 24, 2006	(United States) Ramada Inn, Topeka, Kansas	
5	Win	5–0	(United States) Mike Richardson	TKO	1 (4), 1:05	Nov 1, 2006	(United States) Ameristar Casino, Kansas City, Missouri	
4	Win	4–0	(United States) Reggie Brown	KO	1 (4), 1:21	Sep 16, 2006	(United States) Terrible's Frontier Casino, Saint Joseph, Missouri	
3	Win	3–0	(United States) Larry Lane	TKO	2 (4), 2:54	Aug 18, 2006	(United States) SportsCity, Blue Springs, Missouri	
2	Win	2–0	(United States) Shawn Dean	KO	1 (4), 2:40	May 12, 2006	(United States) Little River Casino, Manistee, Michigan	
1	Win	1–0	(United States) Daniel Russell	TKO	1 (4), 1:20	Apr 5, 2006	(United States) Ameristar Casino, Kansas City, Missouri	Professional debut.
