= Maurice Brantley =

American boxer

Personal information
- Born: September 19, 1968 (age 58) Kansas City, Missouri

Cycling career
- Sport: Cycling

Maurice Brantley (born September 19, 1968, in Kansas City, Missouri) is a professional boxer in the Middleweight division.

== Pro career ==
Early in his career Maurice beat the veteran Reggie Strickland by a six-round decision.

=== WBO NABO Middleweight Championship ===
In his first effort at a World Championship he would lose to champion Brian Barbosa in Radio City Music Hall, New York, New York; the fight was televised on HBO.

On October 17, 2003, Brantley knocked out by three-time World Champion, American Antonio Margarito and the bout was the main event on a TeleFutura fight card.
