= Grover Wiley =

American boxer

Personal information
- Nationality: American
- Born: James Grover Wiley; December 2, 1974 (age 51) Winter Haven, Florida
- Height: 5 ft 10 in (178 cm)
- Weight: Middleweight; Light middleweight

Boxing career
- Reach: 72 in (183 cm)
- Stance: Orthodox

Boxing record
- Total fights: 44
- Wins: 30
- Win by KO: 14
- Losses: 12
- Draws: 1
- No contests: 1

James Grover Wiley (born December 2, 1974) is an American professional boxer. He is perhaps best known for beating Julio César Chávez in the Mexican fighter's last professional bout.

Wiley also fought three-time, two-divisions world champion Greg Haugen, losing to him.

== Professional boxing record ==
44 fights	30 wins	12 losses
By knockout	14	7
By decision	15	5
By disqualification	1	0
Draws	1	
No contests	1	

No.	Result	Record	Opponent	Type	Round, time	Date	Location	Notes
44	Loss	30–12–1 (1)	Jimmy Lange	UD	10	Nov 1, 2008	Patriot Center, Fairfax, Virginia, U.S.	
43	Loss	30–11–1 (1)	Edgar Santana	TKO	3 (8), 1:27	Mar 5, 2008	Hammerstein Ballroom, New York City, New York, U.S.	
42	Loss	30–10–1 (1)	Julio César Chávez Jr.	KO	3 (10), 2:27	Jun 9, 2007	Madison Square Garden, New York City, New York, U.S.	
41	Loss	30–9–1 (1)	Dmitry Salita	UD	10	Mar 10, 2007	Hammerstein Ballroom, New York City, New York, U.S.	
40	Loss	30–8–1 (1)	Julio César García	TKO	2 (12), 0:21	Jul 7, 2006	Celebrity Theatre, Phoenix, Arizona, U.S.	For vacant IBA Americas welterweight title
39	Loss	30–7–1 (1)	Said Ouali	UD	10	Dec 16, 2005	Club Cinema, Pompano Beach, Florida, U.S.	
38	Win	30–6–1 (1)	Julio César Chávez	RTD	5 (10), 3:00	Sep 17, 2005	America West Arena, Phoenix, Arizona, U.S.	
37	Loss	29–6–1 (1)	Luciano Pérez	TKO	5 (10), 2:26	Feb 18, 2005	River Center, Saint Paul, Minnesota, U.S.	
36	Win	29–5–1 (1)	Chuck Dairy	PTS	4	Feb 5, 2005	Diggz Arena, Omaha, Nebraska, U.S.	
35	Loss	28–5–1 (1)	Steve Martinez	TKO	4 (12), 1:47	Nov 1, 2004	Dallas Petroleum Club, Dallas, Texas, U.S.	For vacant WBC-NABF interim welterweight title
34	Win	28–4–1 (1)	Mauricio Rodríguez	TKO	2 (6)	Apr 30, 2004	Pershing Auditorium, Lincoln, Nebraska, U.S.	
33	Win	27–4–1 (1)	Lee Cargle	UD	4	Dec 13, 2003	Mid-America All-Indian Center, Council Bluffs, Iowa, U.S.	
32	Win	26–4–1 (1)	Mario Quintana	UD	4	Nov 8, 2003	Ice Box, Lincoln, Nebraska, U.S.	
31	Loss	25–4–1 (1)	Chris Smith	TKO	6 (8), 2:03	May 23, 2003	Lucky Star Casino, Concho, Oklahoma, U.S.	
30	Win	25–3–1 (1)	Homer Gibbins	TKO	5 (10), 0:20	Apr 4, 2003	Saint Paul Armory, Saint Paul, Minnesota, U.S.	
29	Win	24–3–1 (1)	Reggie Strickland	UD	6	Jan 24, 2003	Roy Wilkins Auditorium, Saint Paul, Minnesota, U.S.	
28	Win	23–3–1 (1)	Ed Lee Humes	TKO	4 (6)	Nov 1, 2002	Roy Wilkins Auditorium, Saint Paul, Minnesota, U.S.	
27	Win	22–3–1 (1)	Ed Lee Humes	KO	2 (6), 2:58	Sep 6, 2002	Roy Wilkins Auditorium, Saint Paul, Minnesota, U.S.	
26	Win	21–3–1 (1)	Enrico Ramirez	UD	6	Aug 11, 2002	Cornhusker Hotel, Lincoln, Nebraska, U.S.	
25	Wim	20–3–1 (1)	Anthony Cobb	UD	6	Apr 12, 2002	Saint Paul, Minnesota, U.S.	
24	Win	19–3–1 (1)	Dean Nichols	TKO	6 (10), 0:45	Jan 31, 2002	Roy Wilkins Auditorium, Saint Paul, Minnesota, U.S.	
23	Win	18–3–1 (1)	Robert Howard	UD	6	Jun 24, 2001	Ameristar Casino, Council Bluffs, Iowa, U.S.	
22	Win	17–3–1 (1)	Michael Manous	KO	2	Nov 24, 2000	Nebraska, U.S.	
21	NC	16–3–1 (1)	Servando Perales	NC	6	Nov 17, 2000	Memorial Auditorium, Burlington, Iowa, U.S.	
20	Win	16–3–1	Julio Ibarra	UD	4	Feb 10, 2000	Harvey's Casino, Council Cluffs, Iowa, U.S.	
19	Win	15–3–1	Tony Fann	TKO	3 (6)	Oct 22, 1999	Omaha, Nebraska, U.S.	
18	Win	14–3–1	Reggie Strickland	UD	6	Aug 20, 1999	Harvey's Casino, Council Bluffs, Iowa, U.S.	
17	Loss	13–3–1	Greg Haugen	UD	10	Apr 24, 1999	Arts Museum, Portland, Oregon, U.S.	
16	Won	13–2–1	Dennis Gross	DQ	3 (6)	Mar 27, 1999	Sokol Hall, Omaha, Nebraska, U.S.	
15	Win	12–2–1	Ken Manuel	TKO	2	Jan 30, 1999	Sokol Hall, Omaha, Nebraska, U.S.	
14	Win	11–2–1	Roy Hughes	TKO	3	Jan 10, 1999	Bourbon Street Tavern, Omaha, Nebraska, U.S.	
13	Win	10–2–1	John Gartner	PTS	4	Dec 4, 1998	Omaha, Nebraska, U.S.	
12	Win	9–2–1	Dwayne Prim	PTS	4	Oct 24, 1998	Sokol Hall, Omaha, Nebraska, U.S.	
11	Win	8–2–1	Trevor Nieman	TKO	4	Sep 4, 1998	Omaha, Nebraska, U.S.	
10	Loss	7–2–1	Raúl Muñoz	KO	3 (4)	Aug 3, 1995	Georgetowne Club, Omaha, Nebraska, U.S.	
9	Loss	7–1–1	Tialano Tovar	TD	5 (6)	Jul 27, 1995	Denver, Colorado, U.S.	Unanimous TD after fight was stopped on cut due to unintentional headbutt
8	Win	7–0–1	Walter Cowans	UD	8	May 4, 1995	Georgetowne Club, Omaha, Nebraska, U.S.	
7	Win	6–0–1	James Osunsedo	PTS	6	Mar 5, 1995	Civic Assembly Center, Muskogee, Oklahoma, U.S.	
6	Win	5–0–1	Tony Enna	UD	4	Jan 24, 1995	Fort Mitchell, Kentucky, U.S.	
5	Draw	4–0–1	Mickle Orr	PTS	4	May 24, 1994	Brady Theater, Tulsa, Oklahoma, U.S.	
4	Win	4–0	James Hall	TKO	1 (4)	May 12, 1994	Ak-Sar-Ben Coliseum, Omaha, Nebraska, U.S.	
3	Win	3–0	Brian Cook	TKO	2	Mar 30, 1994	Sports Arena, Columbia, Missouri, U.S.	
2	Win	2–0	Shukri Shabazz	PTS	4	Feb 15, 1994	Denver, Colorado, U.S.	
1	Win	1–0	Bruce Dunn	KO	1 (4)	Jan 18, 1994	Civic Auditorium, Omaha, Nebraska, U.S.	
