= Buck Smith =

American boxer (born 1965)

Personal information
- Nickname: Tombstone
- Born: Buck Smith; July 22, 1965 (age 61) Oklahoma City, Oklahoma, U.S.
- Height: 5 ft 9 in (175 cm)
- Weight: Welterweight

Boxing career
- Reach: 68 in (173 cm)
- Stance: Orthodox

Boxing record
- Total fights: 229
- Wins: 183
- Win by KO: 121
- Losses: 20
- Draws: 2
- No contests: 24

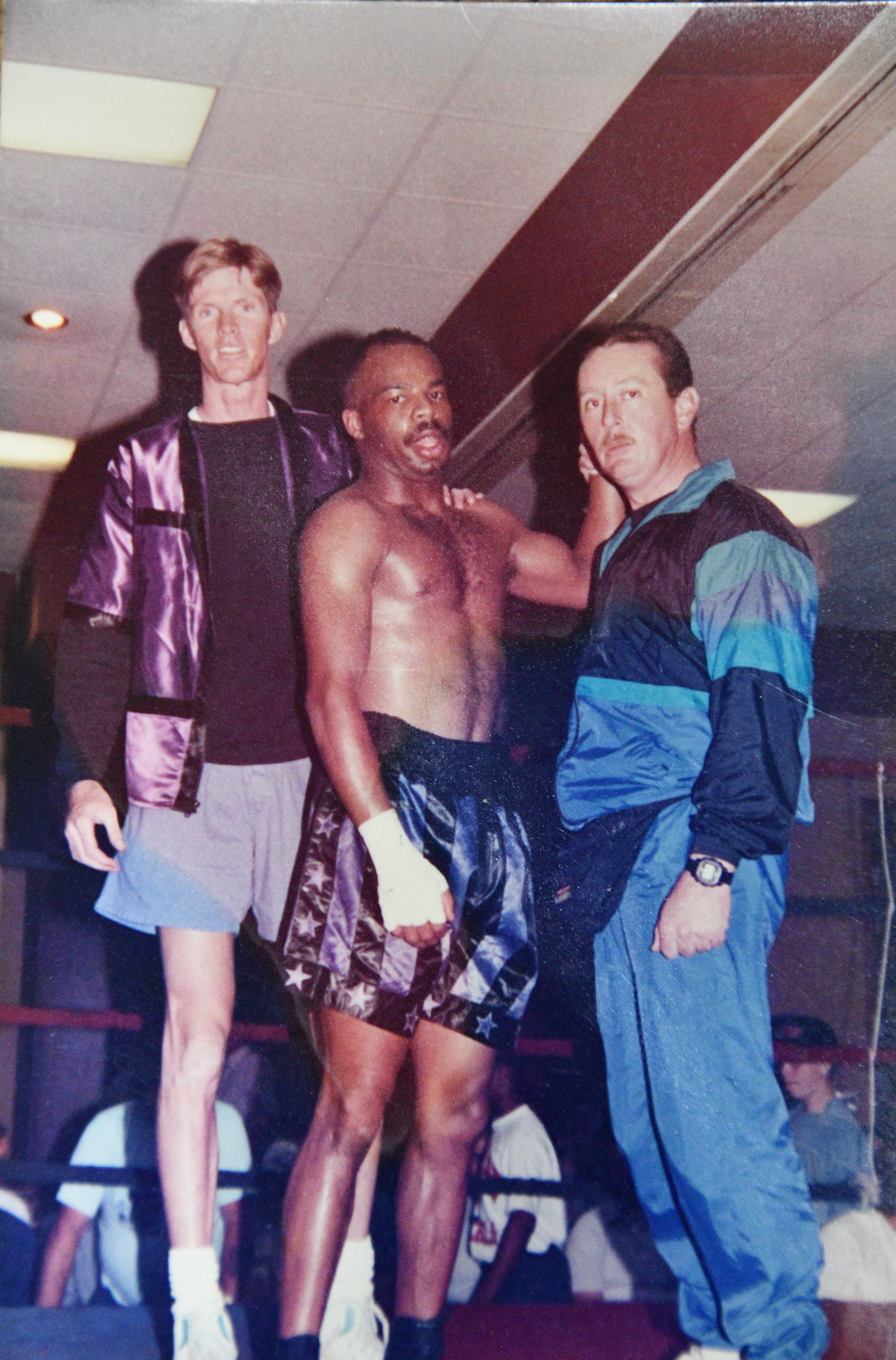
Buck "Tombstone" Smith and Big Joe Haug in Oklahoma City, OK after his second fight of the night and traveling 170 miles from Wichita, KS where he fought Marco Davis three hours earlier.

Buck Smith (born July 22, 1965) is an American former professional boxer in the welterweight division. Although Smith has never been considered more than a journeyman fighter, he is one of boxing's all-time knockout kings with 121 KOs.

== Professional career ==
Smith turned professional in 1987 without having ever boxed before. He lost his very first pro fight, when he volunteered from an Oklahoma City audience for a no-show. He fought someone named Ali Smith and received $50 for his troubles. He had 15 minutes to prepare and competed in street shorts and basketball shoes. Despite losing, Buck Smith managed to last the distance and from then on was obsessed with becoming a fighter. After the loss, Smith embarked on a long winning streak, fighting just about every week, albeit against very ordinary opposition in small Midwestern club venues. When questioned on the level of competition he was facing, Smith calmly responded: "I'm not fighting one bum a month, I'm fighting three or four." He would usually drive himself to fights in his red Honda Civic, with his manager (and lone cornerman) riding shotgun. Smith admitted that he used his heavy schedule to his advantage: his theory was that it was better to get paid to fight and beat lesser opponents than to spar against better ones for little or no money.

All in all, Smith is officially credited with having boxed 229 professional boxing matches. Of these he won 183, 121 of them by knockout. He lost 20 and boxed to 2 draws, and he also had 24 no contests/no decisions. However, it is possible that Smith had fought even more matches under different names, so it is impossible to truly say how many fights he really had.

Despite his long record, Buck Smith never won any major boxing titles. But while most of wins came against unknown opposition, he did manage a few good results. This included a seventh-round KO over contender and European champion Kirkland Laing (who once beat the legendary Roberto Durán) and a second-round knockout over 1988 Olympic gold-medalist Robert Wangila. The win over Wangila got him featured in Ring Magazine, the most prominent of all boxing publications. At the time, Smith sported an official record of 96-2-1 with 70 wins by KO and was ranked 13th at welterweight by the WBC.

He also lost to several former and future champions, including Buddy McGirt, Mark Breland, Julio César Chávez, and Antonio Margarito.

It is also notable that Buck Smith once fought twice in one day. On May 19, 1992, he fought Marco Davis in Wichita Kansas and won by KO in two rounds. Less than 3 hours later, he drove back to Oklahoma City with Cutman Big Joe Haug and won a six-round decision over Rodney Johnson. A similar "iron man stint" by Buck Smith occurred in the month of March in 1993 when Buck Smith fought a total of 12 professional boxing matches. He won all 12, 9 of them by knockout. Such procedures are illegal after the Boxing Reform Act of 1996. By rule, states must honor suspensions, which include a minimum of seven days between bouts.

Smith last fought on June 30, 2007. Fighting far above his best weight, he lost to Marcus Oliveira by second-round KO in a cruiserweight contest. His last win came in a bout with Manuel Esparza against whom he won a 4-round decision in December 1997. That means he did not win a single fight in his last twelve years as a professional boxer. His record stands at 183 wins, 20 losses, 2 draws, and 24 no contests in 229 fights.

=== Fight-fixing allegations ===
Smith is perhaps best known for his role in the government's attempted crackdown on fight fixing in 2004–2005. Smith, along with colleagues Verdell Smith and Sean Gibbons, were called upon to give testimony on fixed fights. The trio of fighters were nicknamed the Knucklehead Boxing Club, and traveled throughout the Midwest making frequent appearances on fight cards. The Knucklehead Boxing Club denied any wrongdoing and stated that they did not participate in any fixed fights.

== Later life ==
After retiring from boxing, Smith opened and ran a gym for about 15 years and was also involved in boxing promotions. He later worked for an electrical company while continuing to support the local boxing community, including helping amateur boxers in gyms around town. In a 2022 interview, Smith said he had been married for 26 years and had two daughters and three grandchildren. His daughter, Evan McKinley Smith, is a Los Angeles based creative director, model, and founder of ES Studio.

== Professional boxing record ==
229 fights	183 wins	20 losses
By knockout	121	9
By decision	62	11
Draws	2	
No contests	24	

No.	Result	Record	Opponent	Type	Round, time	Date	Location	Notes
229	Loss	183–20–2 (24)	(United States) Damon Reed	RTD	1 (8), 3:00	Apr 10, 2009	(United States) Landon Arena, Kansas Expocentre, Topeka, Kansas	
228	Loss	183–19–2 (24)	(United States) Marcus Oliveira	TKO	2 (4), 2:16	Jun 30, 2007	(United States) Ramada Inn, Topeka, Kansas	
227	Loss	183–18–2 (24)	(United States) Rob Calloway	TKO	3 (10), 1:44	Feb 24, 2007	(United States) St. Joseph Civic Arena, Saint Joseph, Missouri	
226	Loss	183–17–2 (24)	(United States) Julius Fogle	UD	6	Aug 26, 2006	(United States) Beaumont Club, Kansas City, Missouri	
225	Loss	183–16–2 (24)	(Mexico) Jorge Kahwagi	KO	1 (10), 1:05	May 31, 2003	(Mexico) Auditorio Fausto Gutierrez Moreno, Tijuana, Baja California	
224	No Contest	183–15–2 (24)	(United States) Dwayne Swift	ND	8	Dec 5, 2000	(United States) Central Plaza Hotel, Oklahoma City, Oklahoma	
223	Loss	183–15–2 (23)	(Mexico) Quirino Garcia	TKO	7 (10)	Sep 2, 2000	(United States) Don Haskins Center, El Paso, Texas	
222	No Contest	183–14–2 (23)	(United States) Rob Bleakley	ND	6	May 11, 2000	(United States) Capitol Plaza Hotel, Jefferson City, Missouri	
221	Loss	183–14–2 (22)	(Mexico) Julio César Chávez	TKO	3 (10)	Dec 18, 1999	(Mexico) Parque de Béisbol, Culiacán, Sinaloa	
220	Loss	183–13–2 (22)	(United States) Antonio Margarito	TKO	6 (6)	Oct 23, 1999	(United States) Will Rogers Coliseum, Fort Worth, Texas	
219	No Contest	183–12–2 (22)	(United States) Danny Thomas	ND	6	May 20, 1999	(United States) Argosy Casino, Kansas City, Missouri	
218	No Contest	183–12–2 (21)	(United States) Ronnie Warrior, Jr.	ND	4	Oct 10, 1998	(United States) St. Joseph Civic Arena, Saint Joseph, Missouri	
217	Loss	183–12–2 (20)	(United States) James Coker	KO	8 (10), 2:19	May 1, 1998	(United States) Freeman Coliseum, San Antonio, Texas	
216	No Contest	183–11–2 (20)	(United States) Verdell Smith	ND	6	Apr 23, 1998	(United States) Adam's Mark Hotel, Tulsa, Oklahoma	Possible exhibition bout
215	No Contest	183–11–2 (19)	(United States) Verdell Smith	ND	6	Mar 28, 1998	(United States) River Market, Kansas City, Missouri	
214	Loss	183–11–2 (18)	(Mexico) Jose "Shibata" Flores	UD	10	Mar 15, 1998	(United States) Sycuan Resort & Casino, El Cajon, California	
213	No Contest	183–10–2 (18)	(United States) Manuel Esparza	ND	4	Feb 10, 1998	(United States) St. Joseph Civic Arena, Saint Joseph, Missouri	
212	Win	183–10–2 (17)	(United States) Manuel Esparza	UD	4	Dec 2, 1997	(United States) New Daisy Beale, Memphis, Tennessee	
211	No Contest	182–10–2 (17)	(United States) Verdell Smith	ND	6	Nov 15, 1997	(United States) River Market, Kansas City, Missouri	Possible exhibition bout
210	Win	182–10–2 (16)	(United States) Ken Manuel	TKO	4 (6)	Sep 30, 1997	(United States) University Plaza Hotel, Springfield, Missouri	
209	No Contest	181–10–2 (16)	(United States) Rob Bleakley	ND	8	Jun 9, 1997	(United States) Supertoad, Des Moines, Iowa	
208	Win	181–10–2 (15)	(United States) Keheven Johnson	UD	4	Mar 28, 1997	(United States) Randy's Dance Club, Salina, Kansas	
207	Win	180–10–2 (15)	(United States) Richard W. Wilson	MD	6	Dec 21, 1996	(United States) Beaumont Club, Kansas City, Missouri	
206	Loss	179–10–2 (15)	(United States) Mark Breland	KO	3 (10), 0:25	May 19, 1996	(United States) The Palace of Auburn Hills, Auburn Hills, Michigan	
205	Win	179–9–2 (15)	(United States) Stan Williamson	TKO	3 (?)	Apr 4, 1996	(United States) Mid-America All-Indian Center, Wichita, Kansas	
204	Win	178–9–2 (15)	(United States) Jeff Frank	UD	10	Mar 5, 1996	(United States) New Daisy Beale, Memphis, Tennessee	
203	Win	177–9–2 (15)	(United States) Reggie Strickland	UD	12	Dec 19, 1995	(United States) Central Plaza Hotel, Oklahoma City, Oklahoma	
202	Win	176–9–2 (15)	(United States) Terry Williams	PTS	8	Dec 4, 1995	(United States) Des Moines, Iowa	
201	Loss	176–9–2 (15)	(South Africa) Gary Murray	UD	12	Aug 26, 1995	(South Africa) Village Green, Durban, KwaZulu-Natal	For vacant WBU world welterweight title
200	Win	175–8–2 (15)	(United States) Reggie Strickland	PTS	6	Aug 3, 1995	(United States) Georgetowne Club, Omaha, Nebraska	
199	Loss	174–8–2 (15)	(Australia) Shannan Taylor	TD	6 (10)	May 29, 1995	(Australia) Parramatta Stadium, Sydney, New South Wales	TD due to a cut eye from an accidental foul on one of the fighters
198	Win	174–7–2 (15)	(United States) Anthony Davidson	KO	1 (8), 0:53	May 11, 1995	(United States) Capitol Plaza Hotel, Jefferson City, Missouri	
197	Win	173–7–2 (15)	(United States) Rob Bleakley	PTS	8	May 4, 1995	(United States) Georgetowne Club, Omaha, Nebraska	
196	No Contest	172–7–2 (15)	(Nigeria) James Osunsedo	ND	4	Apr 25, 1995	(United States) Kentucky	
195	No Contest	172–7–2 (14)	(Nigeria) James Osunsedo	ND	6	Apr 24, 1995	(United States) Kentucky	
194	Win	172–7–2 (13)	(United States) Bob Ervin	UD	6	Mar 13, 1995	(United States) Ramada Inn, Lincoln, Nebraska	
193	Win	171–7–2 (13)	(United States) Reggie Strickland	PTS	6	Mar 5, 1995	(United States) Civic Assembly Center, Muskogee, Oklahoma	
192	Win	170–7–2 (13)	(United States) Richard W. Wilson	TKO	3 (6)	Feb 23, 1995	(United States) Marriott Hotel, Des Moines, Iowa	
191	Win	169–7–2 (13)	(United States) Tommy Jeans	TKO	3 (6), 1:40	Feb 16, 1995	(United States) University Club, Kansas City, Missouri	
190	No Contest	168–7–2 (13)	(United States) Verdell Smith	ND	6	Feb 7, 1995	(United States) Midtown Holiday Inn, Grand Island, Nebraska	
189	Loss	168–7–2 (12)	(United States) Buddy McGirt	UD	10	Jan 10, 1995	(United States) Pontchartrain Center, Kenner, Louisiana	
188	Win	168–6–2 (12)	(United States) Kenny Willis	PTS	6	Dec 13, 1994	(United States) Brewery's Thunderdome, Louisville, Kentucky	
187	Win	167–6–2 (12)	(United States) Verdell Smith	UD	12	Dec 6, 1994	(United States) Central Plaza Hotel, Oklahoma City, Oklahoma	Won vacant USA Oklahoma State welterweight title
186	Win	166–6–2 (12)	(United States) Stanley Jones	TKO	6 (6), 2:14	Nov 18, 1994	(United States) Expo Square Pavilion, Tulsa, Oklahoma	
185	Win	165–6–2 (12)	(United States) Reggie Strickland	UD	6	Nov 3, 1994	(United States) Capitol Plaza Hotel, Jefferson City, Missouri	
184	Win	164–6–2 (12)	(United States) Terry Williams	UD	6	Oct 10, 1994	(United States) Midtown Holiday Inn, Grand Island, Nebraska	
183	Win	163–6–2 (12)	(United States) Reggie Strickland	UD	6	Sep 17, 1994	(United States) Marriott Hotel, Des Moines, Iowa	
182	Win	162–6–2 (12)	(United States) Billy Pryor	TKO	5 (8)	Sep 10, 1994	(United States) State Fair Park 4-H Building, Lincoln, Nebraska	
181	Win	161–6–2 (12)	(United States) Bob Ervin	TKO	4 (6), 2:19	Aug 16, 1994	(United States) Midtown Holiday Inn, Grand Island, Nebraska	
180	Loss	160–6–2 (12)	(United States) Cassius Clay Horne	UD	8	Jul 15, 1994	(United States) America West Arena, Phoenix, Arizona	
179	No Contest	160–5–2 (12)	(United States) Mark Brannon	ND	6	Jun 11, 1994	(United States) Executive Inn, Paducah, Kentucky	
178	No Contest	160–5–2 (11)	(United States) Anthony Davidson	ND	3 (?)	May 24, 1994	(United States) Saint Louis, Missouri	
177	Win	160–5–2 (10)	(United States) Terry Williams	UD	8	Apr 30, 1994	(United States) State Fair Park 4-H Building, Lincoln, Nebraska	
176	Win	159–5–2 (10)	(United States) Mark Brannon	TKO	5 (6)	Apr 28, 1994	(United States) University Plaza Hotel, Springfield, Missouri	
175	Win	158–5–2 (10)	(United States) Tom Bowles	TKO	7 (10),	Apr 12, 1994	(United States) Kansas City, Missouri	Bowles may have been Verdell Smith fighting under an alias
174	No Contest	157–5–2 (10)	(United States) Rob Bleakley	ND	8	Apr 2, 1994	(United States) Executive Inn, Paducah, Kentucky	
173	Win	157–5–2 (9)	(United States) Rob Bleakley	PTS	8	Mar 30, 1994	(United States) Kansas City, Kansas	
172	Win	156–5–2 (9)	(United States) Mark Brannon	TKO	4 (?)	Mar 1, 1994	(United States) Adam's Mark Hotel, Wichita, Kansas	
171	Win	155–5–2 (9)	(United States) Jeff Frank	UD	6	Jan 4, 1994	(United States) Omni New Daisy Theater, Memphis, Tennessee	
170	Win	154–5–2 (9)	(United States) Anthony Davidson	PTS	6	Dec 9, 1993	(United States) Wichita, Kansas	
169	Win	153–5–2 (9)	(United States) Anthony Montana	KO	5 (?)	Dec 7, 1993	(United States) Omni New Daisy Theater, Memphis, Tennessee	
168	Win	152–5–2 (9)	(United States) Anthony Davidson	PTS	6	Nov 23, 1993	(United States) Kansas City, Missouri	
167	Win	151–5–2 (9)	(United States) Kelly Brown	KO	2 (8), 1:43	Nov 15, 1993	(United States) Marriott Hotel, Des Moines, Iowa	
166	Win	150–5–2 (9)	(United States) Steve Barton	TKO	3 (?)	Nov 2, 1993	(United States) Lawton, Oklahoma	
165	Win	149–5–2 (9)	(United States) George Jackson	KO	3 (?)	Oct 27, 1993	(United States) Wichita, Kansas	
164	Win	148–5–2 (9)	(United States) Cornell Butts	KO	3 (?)	Oct 19, 1993	(United States) Oklahoma City, Oklahoma	
163	Win	147–5–2 (9)	(United States) Anthony Henry	KO	1 (8), 1:58	Sep 29, 1993	(United States) Brady Theater, Tulsa, Oklahoma	
162	Loss	146–5–2 (9)	(United States) Brandon Croly	PTS	8	Aug 19, 1993	(United States) Missouri State Fair, Sedalia, Missouri	
161	Win	146–4–2 (9)	(United States) Terry Williams	UD	8	Aug 4, 1993	(United States) Marriott Hotel, Des Moines, Iowa	
160	No Contest	145–4–2 (9)	(United States) Heath Todd	ND	6	Jul 24, 1993	(United States) John Hammonds Center, Joplin, Missouri	
159	Win	145–4–2 (8)	(United States) Willie Jackson	KO	2 (?)	Jun 16, 1993	(United States) Marriott Downtown, Wichita, Kansas	
158	Loss	144–4–2 (8)	(United States) Brandon Croly	MD	10	May 1, 1993	(United States) Del Mar Fairgrounds, Del Mar, California	
157	Win	144–3–2 (8)	(United States) George Jackson	TKO	1 (?), 1:46	Apr 19, 1993	(United States) Regal Riverfront Hotel, Saint Louis, Missouri	
156	Win	143–3–2 (8)	(United States) Kenneth Kidd	TKO	1 (?), 2:47	Mar 30, 1993	(United States) Kemper Arena, Kansas City, Missouri	Kidd boxed under the name "Tony Taylor"
155	Win	142–3–2 (8)	(United States) Chris Clark	TKO	3 (?)	Mar 27, 1993	(United States) Lexington, Oklahoma	
154	Win	141–3–2 (8)	(United States) Tony Miller	TKO	1 (?)	Mar 26, 1993	(United States) Oklahoma City, Oklahoma	
153	Win	140–3–2 (8)	(United States) Gary Brown	PTS	6	Mar 24, 1993	(United States) Louisville, Kentucky	
152	Win	139–3–2 (8)	(United States) Tim Bonds	TKO	5 (?)	Mar 23, 1993	(United States) Ramada Inn Tropical Pavilion, Evansville, Indiana	
151	Win	138–3–2 (8)	(United States) Keith Jones	TKO	5 (?)	Mar 19, 1993	(United States) Wichita, Kansas	
150	Win	137–3–2 (8)	(United States) Tom Bowles	KO	5 (8)	Mar 15, 1993	(United States) Jefferson City, Missouri	Bowles may have been Verdell Smith fighting under an alias
149	Win	136–3–2 (8)	(United States) Jeff Frank	TKO	3 (?), 1:33	Mar 9, 1993	(United States) Maxwell House Hotel, Nashville, Tennessee	
148	Win	135–3–2 (8)	(United States) Anthony Montana	TKO	3 (6), 2:58	Mar 6, 1993	(United States) Oklahoma City, Oklahoma	
147	Win	134–3–2 (8)	(United States) John Ramirez	TKO	2 (?)	Mar 5, 1993	(United States) Louisville, Kentucky	
146	Win	133–3–2 (8)	(United States) Gary Brown	UD	6	Mar 3, 1993	(United States) Louisville, Kentucky	
145	Win	132–3–2 (8)	(United States) Tom Rhinehart	PTS	6	Mar 1, 1993	(United States) Allis Plaza Hotel, Kansas City, Missouri	
144	Win	131–3–2 (8)	(United States) Felix Dubray	PTS	12	Feb 23, 1993	(United States) Purcell, Oklahoma	
143	Win	130–3–2 (8)	(United States) Dean Keene	TKO	2 (6)	Feb 14, 1993	(United States) C.M. Russell High Fieldhouse, Great Falls, Montana	
142	Win	129–3–2 (8)	(United States) Tim Brooks	PTS	6	Feb 6, 1993	(United States) Greensburg, Indiana	Brooks may have been Verdell Smith fighting under an alias
141	Win	128–3–2 (8)	(United States) Kenny Willis	PTS	6	Feb 3, 1993	(United States) London, Kentucky	
140	No Contest	127–3–2 (8)	(United States) Tony R. Kern	ND	4	Feb 2, 1993	(United States) Adam's Mark Hotel, Indianapolis, Indiana	
139	No Contest	127–3–2 (7)	(United States) Keith Jones	NC	3 (?)	Jan 25, 1993	(United States) Allis Plaza Hotel, Kansas City, Missouri	
138	Win	127–3–2 (6)	(United States) Bob Ervin	TKO	3 (?)	Jan 23, 1993	(United States) Veteran's Memorial Coliseum, Cedar Rapids, Iowa	
137	Win	126–3–2 (6)	(United States) Howard Stern	PTS	8	Jan 9, 1993	(United States) Oklahoma City, Oklahoma	
136	Win	125–3–2 (6)	(United States) Anthony Davidson	TKO	2 (?)	Jan 2, 1993	(United States) Mid-America All-Indian Center, Wichita, Kansas	
135	Loss	124–3–2 (6)	(United States) Kevin Pompey	UD	12	Nov 18, 1992	(United States) Knickerbacker Arena, Troy, New York	For IBF–USBA welterweight title
134	No Contest	124–2–2 (6)	(United States) Harold Brazier	ND	6	Nov 7, 1992	(United States) National Guard Armory, Murray, Kentucky	
133	Win	124–2–2 (5)	(United States) Ivan Guban	PTS	8	Oct 21, 1992	(United States) Rock City Cafe, Oklahoma City, Oklahoma	
132	Win	123–2–2 (5)	(United States) Eugene George	TKO	3 (?)	Oct 17, 1992	(United States) Des Moines, Iowa	
131	Win	122–2–2 (5)	(United States) Shane Davis	KO	2 (?)	Oct 5, 1992	(United States) Allis Plaza Hotel, Kansas City, Missouri	Davis evidently boxed under the name "Anthony Davidson"
130	Win	121–2–2 (5)	(United States) Wilbert Blaine	KO	1 (?)	Oct 2, 1992	(United States) Central Plaza Hotel, Oklahoma City, Oklahoma	
129	Win	120–2–2 (5)	(United States) Tony Enna	TKO	4 (?)	Sep 24, 1992	(United States) Mid-America All-Indian Center, Wichita, Kansas	Enna boxed under the name "Tony Montesero"
128	Win	119–2–2 (5)	(United States) Rick Jones	KO	4 (8)	Sep 15, 1992	(United States) Rock City Cafe, Oklahoma City, Oklahoma	
127	Win	118–2–2 (5)	(United States) Bob Ervin	PTS	6	Aug 29, 1992	(United States) Oklahoma City, Oklahoma	
126	Win	117–2–2 (5)	(United States) Keheven Johnson	KO	5 (?)	Aug 26, 1992	(United States) Pueblo, Colorado	
125	No Contest	116–2–2 (5)	(United States) Kenneth Kidd	ND	6 (?)	Aug 17, 1992	(United States) Allis Plaza Hotel, Kansas City, Missouri	Kidd boxed under the name "Tony Taylor"
124	Win	116–2–2 (4)	(United States) Anthony Montana	KO	5 (?)	Aug 1, 1992	(United States) Denver, Colorado	
123	Win	115–2–2 (4)	(United States) Bob Peru	TKO	4 (?)	Jul 25, 1992	(United States) Hugo, Oklahoma	
122	No Contest	114–2–2 (4)	(United States) Harold Brazier	ND	6	Jul 23, 1992	(United States) Rock City Cafe, Oklahoma City, Oklahoma	
121	Win	114–2–2 (3)	(United States) Sam Wilson	TKO	2 (?)	Jun 27, 1992	(United States) Mid-America Expo Center, Paducah, Kentucky	
120	Win	113–2–2 (3)	(United States) Jeff Charles	PTS	6	Jun 22, 1992	(United States) Allis Plaza Hotel, Kansas City, Missouri	
119	Win	112–2–2 (3)	(United States) Tommy Degen	KO	4 (?)	Jun 20, 1992	(United States) KIKS Soccer Arena, Wichita, Kansas	
118	Win	111–2–2 (3)	(United States) Ray Harris	UD	6	Jun 2, 1992	(United States) Omni New Daisy Theater, Memphis, Tennessee	
117	Win	110–2–2 (3)	(United States) Rodney Johnson	UD	6	May 19, 1992	(United States) Central Plaza Hotel, Oklahoma City, Oklahoma	
116	Win	109–2–2 (3)	(United States) Marco Davis	TKO	2 (?)	May 19, 1992	(United States) Wichita, Kansas	
115	Win	108–2–2 (3)	(United States) William Hernandez	KO	2 (10), 2:05	May 7, 1992	(United States) Montana State College Fieldhouse, Bozeman, Montana	
114	Win	107–2–2 (3)	(United States) Tim Bonds	TKO	3 (?)	Apr 28, 1992	(United States) Adam's Mark Hotel, Indianapolis, Indiana	
113	Win	106–2–2 (3)	(United States) Jesse Martinez	TKO	3 (?)	Apr 16, 1992	(United States) Central Plaza Hotel, Oklahoma City, Oklahoma	
112	Win	105–2–2 (3)	(United States) Billy Turner	TKO	3 (?)	Mar 28, 1992	(United States) Bartlesville, Oklahoma	
111	Win	104–2–2 (3)	(United States) Jorge Acosta	PTS	6	Mar 24, 1992	(United States) Adam's Mark Hotel, Indianapolis, Indiana	
110	Win	103–2–2 (3)	(United States) Sammy Brooks	TKO	6 (8), 1:23	Mar 23, 1992	(United States) Allis Plaza Hotel, Kansas City, Missouri	
109	Win	102–2–2 (3)	(United States) Charlie Coldwater	TKO	3 (?)	Mar 14, 1992	(United States) Mid-America All-Indian Center, Wichita, Kansas	
108	Win	101–2–2 (3)	(United States) Quinton Fox	TKO	4 (?)	Mar 12, 1992	(United States) Central Plaza Hotel, Oklahoma City, Oklahoma	
107	Win	100–2–2 (3)	(United States) Darrell Miller	KO	5 (8), 1:30	Mar 7, 1992	(United States) Veteran's Coliseum, Cedar Rapids, Iowa	
106	Win	99–2–2 (3)	(United States) Kenneth Kidd	TKO	2 (?)	Feb 8, 1992	(United States) Carthage Memorial Hall, Carthage, Missouri	
105	Win	98–2–2 (3)	(United States) Dennis Dickerson	UD	8	Feb 3, 1992	(United States) Allis Plaza Hotel, Kansas City, Missouri	
104	Win	97–2–2 (3)	(United States) Brian Young	TKO	5 (?)	Feb 1, 1992	(United States) Greensburg, Indiana	
103	Win	96–2–2 (3)	(United States) Wilbert Blaine	KO	1 (8)	Jan 30, 1992	(United States) Central Plaza Hotel, Oklahoma City, Oklahoma	
102	Win	95–2–2 (3)	(United States) Tim Bonds	TKO	4 (?)	Jan 24, 1992	(United States) Mid-America All-Indian Center, Wichita, Kansas	
101	Win	94–2–2 (3)	(United States) Lorenzo Thomas	KO	3 (?)	Jan 11, 1992	(United States) Lexington, Oklahoma	
100	Win	93–2–2 (3)	(Kenya) Robert Wangila	TKO	2 (10), 1:06	Dec 19, 1991	(United States) The Hacienda, Las Vegas, Nevada	
99	Win	92–2–2 (3)	(United States) Jerry Brown	TKO	5 (6)	Dec 3, 1991	(United States) Central Plaza Hotel, Oklahoma City, Oklahoma	
98	Win	91–2–2 (3)	(United States) Dick Allen	TKO	3 (?)	Nov 19, 1991	(United States) Oklahoma City, Oklahoma	
97	Win	90–2–2 (3)	(United States) George Randolph	TKO	3 (?)	Nov 14, 1991	(United States) Brick Breeden Fieldhouse, Montana State University, Bozeman, Montana	
96	Win	89–2–2 (3)	(United States) Gary Williamson	TKO	2 (?)	Nov 2, 1991	(United States) Century II Auditorium, Wichita, Kansas	
95	Win	88–2–2 (3)	(United States) Tim Payton	PTS	6	Oct 17, 1991	(United States) Knights of Columbus, Indianapolis, Indiana	
94	Win	87–2–2 (3)	(United States) Quinton Fox	UD	6	Oct 14, 1991	(United States) Allis Plaza Hotel, Wichita, Kansas	
93	Win	86–2–2 (3)	(United States) Rico Hernandez	TKO	5 (6)	Oct 12, 1991	(United States) State Fair Park 4-H Building, Lincoln, Nebraska	
92	Win	85–2–2 (3)	(United States) Keheven Johnson	KO	3 (?)	Oct 1, 1991	(United States) Omni New Daisy Theater, Memphis, Tennessee	
91	Win	84–2–2 (3)	(United States) Howard Stern	KO	2 (?)	Sep 11, 1991	(United States) Central Plaza Hotel, Oklahoma City, Oklahoma	
90	Win	83–2–2 (3)	(United States) Kenneth Kidd	UD	6	Sep 9, 1991	(United States) Allis Plaza Hotel, Kansas City, Missouri	
89	Win	82–2–2 (3)	(United States) Keheven Johnson	RTD	5 (10), 3:00	Aug 8, 1991	(United States) Joey's Blues Bar, Tulsa, Oklahoma	
88	Win	81–2–2 (3)	(United States) Harold Pinckney	KO	2 (?)	Aug 6, 1991	(United States) Omni New Daisy Theater, Memphis, Tennessee	
87	Win	80–2–2 (3)	(United States) Rocky Berg	UD	6	Jul 22, 1991	(United States) Adam’s Mark Hotel, Kansas City, Missouri	
86	Win	79–2–2 (3)	(United States) Mike Crawford	KO	1 (?)	Jul 9, 1991	(United States) Central Plaza Hotel, Oklahoma City, Oklahoma	
85	Win	78–2–2 (3)	(United States) Trent Elwick	PTS	6	Jun 17, 1991	(United States) Central Plaza Hotel, Oklahoma City, Oklahoma	
84	Win	77–2–2 (3)	(United States) Rocky Berg	UD	6	May 30, 1991	(United States) Southland Greyhound Park, West Memphis, Arkansas	Berg boxed under the name "Rocky Vires"
83	Win	76–2–2 (3)	(United States) Jorge Acosta	PTS	10	May 24, 1991	(United States) Carthage, Missouri	
82	Win	75–2–2 (3)	(United States) Vince Baldwin	TKO	1 (?)	May 23, 1991	(United States) Peony Park Ballroom, Omaha, Nebraska	
81	Win	74–2–2 (3)	(United States) Tommy Jeans	KO	2 (?)	May 3, 1991	(United States) Boxing Plaza, Oklahoma City, Oklahoma	
80	Win	73–2–2 (3)	(United States) Jorge Acosta	PTS	10	Apr 26, 1991	(United States) Mid-America All-Indian Center, Wichita, Kansas	
79	Win	72–2–2 (3)	(United States) Darrell Bryant	TKO	3 (6)	Apr 13, 1991	(United States) Civic Center, Miami, Oklahoma	
78	Win	71–2–2 (3)	(United States) Ken Jackson	KO	2 (?)	Apr 12, 1991	(United States) Muskogee, Oklahoma	
77	Win	70–2–2 (3)	(United States) Ira Hathaway	KO	4 (8)	Apr 5, 1991	(United States) Boxing Plaza, Oklahoma City, Oklahoma	Hathaway boxed under the name "Tommy Jeans"
76	Win	69–2–2 (3)	(United States) Rico Hernandez	UD	8	Mar 14, 1991	(United States) Park Plaza Hotel, Tulsa, Oklahoma	
75	Win	68–2–2 (3)	(United States) Tommy Degen	KO	3 (?)	Mar 8, 1991	(United States) Crest Theatre, Wichita, Kansas	
74	Win	67–2–2 (3)	(United States) Bobby Thomas	KO	2 (8)	Mar 1, 1991	(United States) Boxing Plaza, Oklahoma City, Oklahoma	
73	Win	66–2–2 (3)	(United States) Mike Mackey	KO	2 (?)	Feb 23, 1991	(United States) Ardmore, Oklahoma	
72	Win	65–2–2 (3)	(United States) Jarvis McMillan	TKO	2 (?)	Feb 19, 1991	(United States) T. Michael's Dance Club, Goodlettsville, Tennessee	
71	Win	64–2–2 (3)	(United States) Andre Hawthorne	KO	3 (?)	Feb 16, 1991	(United States) Oklahoma City, Oklahoma	
70	Win	63–2–2 (3)	(United States) Jake Torrance	PTS	10	Feb 1, 1991	(United States) Boxing Plaza, Oklahoma City, Oklahoma	
69	Win	62–2–2 (3)	(United States) Jerry L. Smith	KO	2 (6), 1:22	Jan 22, 1991	(United States) Park Plaza Hotel, Tulsa, Oklahoma	Jerry Smith fought under the name "Verdell Smith"
68	Win	61–2–2 (3)	(United States) Kevin Anderson	TKO	1 (4), 1:47	Jan 6, 1991	(United States) Bismarck Civic Center, Bismarck, North Dakota	
67	No Contest	60–2–2 (3)	(United States) Kenneth Kidd	ND	4	Dec 11, 1990	(United States) Sherwood Club, Indianapolis, Indiana	
66	Win	60–2–2 (2)	(United States) John E.D. Simmons	KO	3 (10)	Dec 4, 1990	(United States) Central Plaza Hotel, Oklahoma City, Oklahoma	
65	Win	59–2–2 (2)	(United States) Willie Barnes	KO	6 (10), 2:08	Nov 17, 1990	(United States) Sheraton Kensington Hotel, Tulsa, Oklahoma	
64	Win	58–2–2 (2)	(United States) John Greene	KO	1 (?)	Nov 8, 1990	(United States) Lexington, Oklahoma	
63	Win	57–2–2 (2)	(United States) Tommy Jeans	UD	6	Nov 6, 1990	(United States) Omni New Daisy Theatre, Memphis, Tennessee	
62	Win	56–2–2 (2)	(United States) Keheven Johnson	UD	6	Nov 1, 1990	(United States) Sherwood Club, Indianapolis Indiana	
61	Win	55–2–2 (2)	(United States) Ali Akar	UD	8	Oct 27, 1990	(United States) Bismarck Civic Center, Bismarck, North Dakota	
60	Win	54–2–2 (2)	(United States) Elwee Jackson	KO	4 (?)	Oct 23, 1990	(United States) Lexington, Oklahoma	
59	Win	53–2–2 (2)	(United States) Billy Tutt	KO	1 (?)	Oct 19, 1990	(United States) Central Plaza Hotel, Oklahoma City, Oklahoma	
58	Win	52–2–2 (2)	(United States) Sam Wilson	TKO	4 (?)	Oct 13, 1990	(United States) Mackin Hall, Louisville, Kentucky	
57	Win	51–2–2 (2)	(United States) Kenny Brown	PTS	12	Sep 27, 1991	(United States) Oklahoma City, Oklahoma	
56	Win	50–2–2 (2)	(United States) Tim Jackson	KO	2 (?)	Sep 11, 1990	(United States) Central Plaza Hotel, Oklahoma City, Oklahoma	
55	No Contest	49–2–2 (2)	(United States) Harold Brazier	ND	15	Aug 27, 1990	(United States) Park Plaza Hotel, Tulsa, Oklahoma	
54	Win	49–2–2 (1)	(United States) Marcellus Jackson	TKO	3 (?), 2:26	Aug 7, 1990	(United States) Memphis, Tennessee	
53	Win	48–2–2 (1)	(United States) Verdell Smith	UD	8	Jul 31, 1990	(United States) Oklahoma City, Oklahoma	
52	Win	47–2–2 (1)	(United States) John Greene	TKO	4 (?)	Jul 30, 1990	(United States) Oklahoma City, Oklahoma	
51	Win	46–2–2 (1)	(United States) Reese Smith	KO	1 (10)	Jul 16, 1990	(United States) Central Plaza Hotel, Oklahoma City, Oklahoma	
50	Win	45–2–2 (1)	(United States) Willie Barnes	KO	9 (?)	Jun 21, 1990	(United States) Central Plaza Hotel, Oklahoma City, Oklahoma	
49	Win	44–2–2 (1)	(United States) Leroy Jones	UD	6	Jun 9, 1990	(United States) Kansas City Memorial Hall, Kansas City, Kansas	
48	Win	43–2–2 (1)	(United States) Keheven Johnson	KO	5 (?)	May 24, 1990	(United States) Oklahoma City, Oklahoma	Johnson boxed under the name "Anthony Phillips"
47	Win	42–2–2 (1)	(United States) Bud Adams	KO	1 (?)	May 18, 1990	(United States) Norman, Oklahoma	
46	Win	41–2–2 (1)	(United States) John Walker	KO	3 (?)	May 1, 1990	(United States) Oklahoma City, Oklahoma	
45	Win	40–2–2 (1)	(United States) Bobby Thomas	KO	4 (?)	Apr 17, 1990	(United States) Oklahoma City, Oklahoma	
44	Win	39–2–2 (1)	(United States) Ricky Decker	KO	3 (?)	Apr 3, 1990	(United States) Oklahoma City, Oklahoma	
43	Win	38–2–2 (1)	(United States) Tim Brooks	KO	6 (10)	Mar 20, 1990	(United States) Oklahoma City, Oklahoma	Brooks may have been Verdell Smith fighting under an alias
42	Win	37–2–2 (1)	(United States) Ali Akar	KO	1 (?)	Mar 6, 1990	(United States) Oklahoma City, Oklahoma	
41	Win	36–2–2 (1)	(United States) Rico Hernandez	KO	5 (?)	Feb 20, 1990	(United States) Central Plaza Hotel, Oklahoma City, Oklahoma	
40	Win	35–2–2 (1)	(United States) Rocky Berg	PTS	10	Jan 23, 1990	(United States) Oklahoma City, Oklahoma	Berg fought under the name "Rocky Vires"
39	Win	34–2–2 (1)	(United Kingdom) Kirkland Laing	KO	7 (10), 1:09	Jan 10, 1990	(United Kingdom) Royal Albert Hall, London	
38	Win	33–2–2 (1)	(United States) Gary Thompson	UD	10	Dec 12, 1989	(United States) Oklahoma City, Oklahoma	
37	Win	32–2–2 (1)	(United States) Mike Gregory	KO	1 (?)	Dec 5, 1989	(United States) Oklahoma City, Oklahoma	
36	Win	31–2–2 (1)	(United States) Tim Jackson	KO	3 (?)	Nov 29, 1989	(United States) Norman, Oklahoma	
35	No Contest	30–2–2 (1)	(United States) Terry Lee Thomas	ND	10	Nov 21, 1989	(United States) Oklahoma City, Oklahoma	
34	Win	30–2–2	(United States) Rico Hernandez	UD	8	Nov 7, 1989	(United States) Central Plaza Hotel, Oklahoma City, Oklahoma	
33	Win	29–2–2	(United States) Jesse Martinez	KO	3 (?)	Oct 17, 1989	(United States) Central Plaza Hotel, Oklahoma City, Oklahoma	
32	Win	28–2–2	(United States) James Solomon	KO	2 (?)	Oct 3, 1989	(United States) Oklahoma City, Oklahoma	
31	Win	27–2–2	(United States) Gary Thompson	PTS	8	Sep 5, 1989	(United States) Oklahoma City, Oklahoma	
30	Win	26–2–2	(United States) Randy Collins	KO	4 (?)	Aug 24, 1989	(United States) Oklahoma City, Oklahoma	
29	Win	25–2–2	(United States) Jerry Williamson	PTS	6	Aug 15, 1989	(United States) Oklahoma City, Oklahoma	
28	Win	24–2–2	(United States) Ponce Ortiz	KO	3 (?)	Aug 1, 1989	(United States) Oklahoma City, Oklahoma	
27	Win	23–2–2	(United States) Dick Allen	KO	2 (?)	Jul 11, 1989	(United States) Oklahoma City, Oklahoma	
26	Loss	22–2–2	(Kenya) Robert Wangila	MD	6	Jun 12, 1989	(United States) Caesars Palace, Las Vegas Nevada	
25	Draw	22–1–2	(United States) Tim Bennett	TD	1 (6)	May 2, 1989	(United States) Oklahoma City, Oklahoma	
24	Win	22–1–1	(United States) Brad Billings	KO	3 (?)	Apr 15, 1989	(United States) Oklahoma City, Oklahoma	
23	Win	21–1–1	(United States) Tim Brooks	PTS	6	Apr 4, 1989	(United States) Oklahoma City, Oklahoma	Brooks may have been Verdell Smith fighting under an alias
22	Win	20–1–1	(United States) Wilson Douglas	KO	2 (?)	Mar 21, 1989	(United States) Oklahoma City, Oklahoma	
21	Win	19–1–1	(United States) Billy Tutt	KO	3 (4)	Mar 7, 1989	(United States) Central Plaza Hotel, Oklahoma City, Oklahoma	
20	Win	18–1–1	(United States) Keheven Johnson	PTS	4	Feb 21, 1989	(United States) Oklahoma City, Oklahoma	
19	Win	17–1–1	(United States) Jim Wright	KO	2 (?)	Feb 7, 1989	(United States) Central Plaza Hotel, Oklahoma City, Oklahoma	The Oklahoman reported instead that this opponent was Jim Kaczmarek and that Smith won by unanimous decision
18	Win	16–1–1	(United States) Jose Ramirez	KO	4 (4)	Dec 6, 1988	(United States) Oklahoma City, Oklahoma	
17	Win	15–1–1	(United States) Trent Elwick	KO	3 (4)	Nov 15, 1988	(United States) Oklahoma City, Oklahoma	
16	Win	14–1–1	(United States) Tim Hall	TKO	2 (4)	Nov 1, 1988	(United States) Central Plaza Hotel, Oklahoma City, Oklahoma	
15	Win	13–1–1	(United States) Jerry Brown	KO	3 (4)	Oct 18, 1988	(United States) Central Plaza Hotel, Oklahoma City, Oklahoma	
14	Win	12–1–1	(United States) Mike Armstrong	KO	2 (?)	Oct 4, 1988	(United States) Central Plaza Hotel, Oklahoma City, Oklahoma	
13	Win	11–1–1	(United States) Richie White	PTS	4	Sep 20, 1988	(United States) Central Plaza Hotel, Oklahoma City, Oklahoma	
12	Win	10–1–1	(United States) Carl Penn	KO	2 (?)	Aug 30, 1988	(United States) Habana Inn, Oklahoma City, Oklahoma	
11	Win	9–1–1	(United States) Roger Choate	PTS	6	Aug 2, 1988	(United States) Central Plaza Hotel, Oklahoma City, Oklahoma	
10	Win	8–1–1	(United States) Tim Bonds	KO	2 (?)	Jul 19, 1988	(United States) Oklahoma City, Oklahoma	
9	Draw	7–1–1	(United States) Wendell Stafford	PTS	4	Jul 5, 1988	(United States) Central Plaza Hotel, Oklahoma City, Oklahoma	
8	Win	7–1	(United States) Nicholas Gray	KO	2 (4), 1:37	Apr 5, 1988	(United States) Central Plaza Hotel, Oklahoma City, Oklahoma	
7	Win	6–1	(United States) Clarence King	KO	1 (4)	Mar 1, 1988	(United States) Oklahoma City, Oklahoma	
6	Win	5–1	(United States) Vernon Garrett	UD	4	Feb 2, 1988	(United States) Central Plaza Hotel, Oklahoma City, Oklahoma	
5	Win	4–1	(United States) Simmie Black	UD	6	Nov 17, 1987	(United States) Central Plaza Hotel, Oklahoma City, Oklahoma	
4	Win	3–1	(United States) Steve McMinn	KO	2 (?)	Oct 28, 1987	(United States) Dallas, Texas	
3	Win	2–1	(United States) Tim Jackson	KO	1 (4)	Oct 20, 1987	(United States) Central Plaza Hotel, Oklahoma City, Oklahoma	
2	Win	1–1	(United States) Mike Gregory	KO	1 (4)	Oct 6, 1987	(United States) Central Plaza Hotel, Oklahoma City, Oklahoma	
1	Loss	0–1	(United States) Ali Smith	PTS	4	Aug 18, 1987	(United States) Trade Winds Central Inn, Oklahoma City, Oklahoma	

== See also ==
- Angel Robinson Garcia
- Peter Buckley
