= Verdell Smith =

Professional boxer

Personal information
- Nickname: Tim Brooks/Tommy Bowles/Junior
- Nationality: American
- Born: Verdell Smith; November 1, 1963 (age 63) Oklahoma City, Oklahoma, U.S.
- Weight: Welterweight

Boxing career
- Stance: Orthodox

Boxing record
- Total fights: 119
- Wins: 46
- Win by KO: 18
- Losses: 63
- Draws: 3
- No contests: 7

Verdell Smith, a.k.a. Tommy Bowles, a.k.a. Tim Brooks (born November 1, 1963) is an American former professional boxer. Smith, a journeyman fighter, appeared on the front page of the May 10, 2004, edition of The New York Times, as he was the focal point of a lengthy article in the Times's sports section on alleged fight fixing.

== Professional career ==
Smith turned professional in 1988 and fought the majority of his fights in Oklahoma and other Midwest states, under his birth name and other boxing aliases. In the article, Smith explained that fighting under assumed names "is what we needed to do, [in order] to get paid", and was also quoted as saying: "None of my fights are fixed. I just don't like getting hurt, and I'm not going to risk my brain and my kids to prove anything."

Among his notable fights, Smith lost to Jesse James Leija, Julio César Chávez, and Jorge Páez. The fight with Paez was the subject of a 2004 FBI investigation against promoter Bob Arum for fight fixing.

== Fight fixing allegations ==
Smith is perhaps best known for his role in the government's attempted crackdown on fight fixing in 2004–2005. Verdell, along with colleagues Buck Smith and Sean Gibbons, were called upon to give testimony about fixed fights in boxing. The trio was nicknamed the Knucklehead Boxing Club, and traveled throughout the Midwest making frequent appearances on fight cards. The Knucklehead Boxing Club denied any wrongdoing and stated that they did not participate in any fixed fights.
