= Boxing at the 1984 Summer Olympics – Light middleweight =

Olympic boxing tournament

Light middleweight boxing at the Games of the XXIII Olympiad
- Venue: Los Angeles Memorial Sports Arena
- Dates: 29 July – 11 August 1984
- Competitors: 34 from 34 nations

Medalists
1st place, gold medalist(s)		Frank Tate	United States
2nd place, silver medalist(s)		Shawn O'Sullivan	Canada
3rd place, bronze medalist(s)		Christophe Tiozzo	France
3rd place, bronze medalist(s)		Manfred Zielonka	West Germany

The men's light middleweight event was part of the boxing programme at the 1984 Summer Olympics. The weight class allowed boxers of up to 71 kilograms to compete. The competition was held from 29 July to 11 August 1984. 34 boxers from 34 nations competed.

== Medalists ==
Gold	Frank Tate; United States
Silver	Shawn O'Sullivan; Canada
Bronze	Christophe Tiozzo; France
Bronze	Manfred Zielonka; West Germany

== Results ==
The following boxers took part in the event:

Rank	Name	Country
1	Frank Tate	United States
2	Shawn O'Sullivan	Canada
3T	Christophe Tiozzo	France
3T	Manfred Zielonka	West Germany
5T	Gnohere Sery	Ivory Coast
5T	Christopher Kapopo	Zambia
5T	Israel Cole	Sierra Leone
5T	Rod Douglas	Great Britain
9T	Gustavo Ollo	Argentina
9T	Ralph Labrosse	Seychelles
9T	Abdellah Tibazi	Morocco
9T	Romolo Casamonica	Italy
9T	Elone Lutui	Tonga
9T	Vicky Byarugaba	Uganda
9T	Chiharu Ogiwara	Japan
9T	An Dal-ho	South Korea
17T	Ambrose Mlilo	Zimbabwe
17T	Perfecto Bobadilla	Paraguay
17T	Pierre Claver Mella	Cameroon
17T	Salulolo Aumua	Samoa
17T	Richard Finch	Australia
17T	Maxime Mehinto	Benin
17T	Lotfi Ayed	Sweden
17T	Sam Storey	Ireland
17T	Fubulume Inyama	Zaire
17T	Víctor Claudio	Puerto Rico
17T	Simen Auseth	Norway
17T	Sullemana Sadik	Ghana
17T	Mario Centeno	Nicaragua
17T	Stephen Okumu	Kenya
17T	Mohamed Halibi	Lebanon
17T	Augustino Marial	Sudan
33T	Fletcher Kapito	Malawi
33T	Gheorghe Simion	Romania

=== First round ===
- August Marial (SUD) def. Fletcher Kapito (MLW), 3:2
- Ahn Dal-Ho (KOR) def. Gheorghe Simion (ROU), 5:0

=== Second round ===
- Manfred Zielonka (FRG) def. Ambrose Mlilo (ZIM), 4:1
- Gustavo Ollo (ARG) def. Perfecto Bobadilla (PAR), 5:0
- Ralph Lambrosse (SEY) def. Pierre Claver Mella (CMR), 4:1
- Gnohery Sery (IVC) def. Salulolo Aumua (SAM), KO-2
- Christopher Kapopo (ZAM) def. Richard Finch (AUS), 4:1
- Abdellah Tibazi (MAR) def. Maxime Mehinto (BEN), 5:0
- Frank Tate (USA) def. Lotfi Ayed (SWE), 5:0
- Romolo Casamonica (ITA) def. Samuel Storey (IRL), RSC-3
- Elone Lutui (TNG) def. Fubulume Inyama (ZAI), 4:1
- Israel Cole (SLE) def. Victor Claudio (PUR), RSC-1
- Vincent Byarugaba (UGA) def. Simen Auseth (NOR), 4:1
- Christophe Tiozzo (FRA) def. Sullemana Sadik (GHA), 5:0
- Chiharu Ogiwara (JPN) def. Mario Centeno (NIC), KO-1
- Rod Douglas (GBR) def. Stephen Okumu (KEN), 4:1
- Shawn O'Sullivan (CAN) def. Mohamed Halibi (LIB), RSC-2
- Ahn Dal-Ho (KOR) def. August Marial (SUD), 5:0

=== Third round ===
- Manfred Zielonka (FRG) def. Gustavo Ollo (ARG), 5:0
- Gnohery Sery (IVC) def. Ralph Lambrosse (SEY), 4:1
- Christopher Kapopo (ZAM) def. Abdellah Tibazi (MAR), 3:2
- Frank Tate (USA) def. Romolo Casamonica (ITA), 5:0
- Israel Cole (SLE) def. Elone Lutui (TNG), RSCH-2
- Christophe Tiozzo (FRA) def. Vincent Byarugaba (UGA), 5:0
- Rod Douglas (GBR) def. Chiharu Ogiwara (JPN), 4:1
- Shawn O'Sullivan (CAN) def. Ahn Dal-Ho (KOR), RSC-1

=== Quarterfinals ===
- Manfred Zielonka (FRG) def. Gnohery Sery (IVC), 5:0
- Frank Tate (USA) def. Christopher Kapopo (ZAM), RSC-1
- Christophe Tiozzo (FRA) def. Israel Cole (SLE), 5:0
- Shawn O'Sullivan (CAN) def. Rod Douglas (GBR), 5:0

=== Semifinals ===
- Frank Tate (USA) def. Manfred Zielonka (FRG), walk-over
- Shawn O'Sullivan (CAN) def. Christophe Tiozzo (FRA), 5:0

=== Final ===
- Frank Tate (USA) def. Shawn O'Sullivan (CAN), 5:0
