= Víctor Córdoba =

Víctor Córdoba may refer to:

- Víctor Córdoba (boxer) (born 1962), Panamanian boxer
- Víctor Córdoba (footballer) (born 1987), Colombian footballer
