= Frank Tate (boxer) =

American boxer

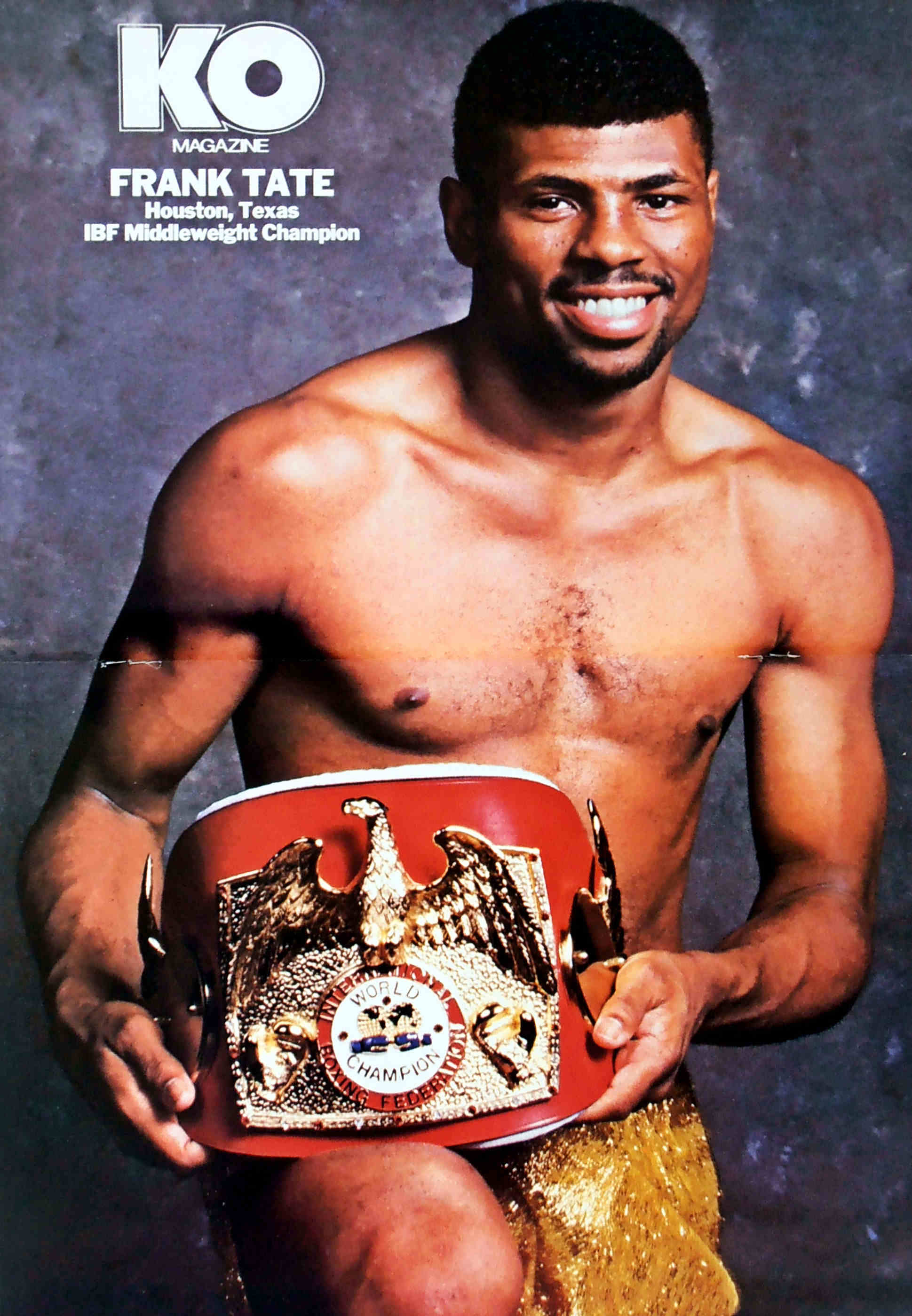
- Tate c. 1988

Personal information
- Nationality: (United States) American
- Born: Frank Tate; August 27, 1964 (age 61) Detroit, Michigan, U.S.
- Height: 6 ft 0 in (183 cm)
- Weight: Middleweight; Super middleweight; Light heavyweight

Boxing career
- Reach: 72 in (183 cm)
- Stance: Orthodox

Boxing record
- Total fights: 46
- Wins: 41
- Win by KO: 24
- Losses: 5
Medal record
Boxing
Representing the United States
Olympic Games
| Gold medal – first place | 1984 Los Angeles | Light middleweight |

Frank Tate (born August 27, 1964) is an American former professional boxer.

== Amateur career ==
Tate was the 1983 National Golden Gloves light middleweight champion. He trained at the Kronk Gym in Detroit under head coach Emanuel Steward, alongside fellow Olympic gold medalist Steve McCrory and world champions including Thomas Hearns and Hilmer Kenty. In 1984, Tate was ranked fifth in the world by the AIBA at light middleweight — one of four Kronk Gym fighters simultaneously ranked in the AIBA world top ten that year. He also won the light middleweight gold medal at the 1984 Summer Olympics even though he had standing eight-counts administered to him twice in the second round of the gold medal bout against Canadian fighter Shawn O'Sullivan.

=== Olympic results ===
- 1st round bye
- Defeated Lotfi Ayed (Sweden) 5–0
- Defeated Romolo Casamonica (Italy) 5–0
- Defeated Christopher Kapopo (Zambia) RSC 1
- Defeated Manfred Zielonka (West Germany) by walkover
- Defeated Shawn O'Sullivan (Canada) 5–0

== Professional career ==
=== Middleweight ===
Tate began his professional career in December 1984. At 20–0, Tate won the vacant IBF middleweight title by beating Michael Olajide over fifteen rounds at Caesars Palace, Las Vegas in October 1987. Tate successfully defended his title against Tony Sibson with a tenth round stoppage in Staffordshire, England, before losing his belt to undefeated phenom Michael Nunn in nine rounds at Caesars Palace in July 1988.

=== Super-middleweight ===
In January 1990 at Municipal Auditorium, New Orleans, Louisiana, Tate boxed Lindell Holmes for the vacant IBF super-middleweight title, losing a close majority decision.

=== Light-heavyweight ===
Following the defeat, Tate moved up to light-heavyweight and defeated Uriah Grant and Andrew Maynard on a six fight win streak to set up a fight for the vacant WBA title against Virgil Hill in 1992. Tate lost a unanimous decision. After four more wins, Tate was granted a rematch with Hill in 1994 but again lost a convincing decision. This was Tate's last major fight, and after several victories over limited competition he was stopped in four rounds against David Telesco in his final pro bout.

== Professional boxing record ==
| 46 fights | 41 wins | 5 losses |
|---|---|---|
| By knockout | 24 | 2 |
| By decision | 17 | 3 |

| No. | Result | Record | Opponent | Type | Round, time | Date | Location | Notes |
|---|---|---|---|---|---|---|---|---|
| 46 | Loss | 41–5 | (United States) David Telesco | TKO | 4 (10) | 09/10/1998 | (United States) Capitol Theatre, Port Chester | |
| 45 | Win | 41–4 | (United States) Tyler Hughes | TKO | 7 (10) | 11/07/1998 | (United States) Hilton Hotel, Reno | |
| 44 | Win | 40–4 | (Mexico) David Humberto Gamez | TKO | 1 (8) | 29/05/1998 | (United States) Sheraton Hotel, Houston | |
| 43 | Win | 39–4 | (Germany) Norbert Nieroba | SD | 12 (12) | 30/08/1997 | (Germany) Max-Schmeling-Halle, Berlin | Won WBU Light-Heavyweight Title |
| 42 | Win | 38–4 | (United States) Gary Butler | TKO | 2 (8) | 24/06/1997 | (United States) Argosy Festival Atrium, Baton Rouge | |
| 41 | Win | 37–4 | (United States) Cliff Nellon | UD | 10 (10) | 15/03/1997 | (United States) Dallas, Texas | |
| 40 | Win | 36–4 | (Mexico) Everardo Armenta Jr. | UD | 10 (10) | 09/04/1996 | (United States) Fantasy Springs Resort Casino, Indio | |
| 39 | Win | 35–4 | (United States) Dominick Carter | TKO | 8 (12) | 25/10/1995 | (United States) Pontchartrain Center, Kenner, Louisiana | |
| 38 | Loss | 34–4 | (United States) Virgil Hill | UD | 12 (12) | 23/07/1994 | (United States) Civic Center, Bismarck, North Dakota | For WBA light-heavyweight title. |
| 37 | Win | 34–3 | (Mexico) Rosendo Rosales | KO | 2 (10) | 18/12/1993 | (Mexico) Estadio Cuauhtemoc, Puebla | |
| 36 | Win | 33–3 | (Mexico) Everardo Armenta Jr | TKO | 9 (10) | 10/09/1993 | (United States) Alamodome, San Antonio, Texas | |
| 35 | Win | 32–3 | (United States) Ron Cramner | KO | 6 (10) | 13/08/1993 | (Canada) Cloverdale, British Columbia | |
| 34 | Win | 31–3 | (Jordan) Ramzi Hassan | SD | 10 (10) | 09/01/1993 | (United States) Houston, Texas | |
| 33 | Loss | 30–3 | (United States) Virgil Hill | UD | 12 (12) | 29/09/1992 | (United States) Civic Center, Bismarck, North Dakota | For WBA light-heavyweight title. |
| 32 | Win | 30–2 | (United States) Tim Johnson | TKO | 6 (10) | 27/03/1992 | (United States) Clarion Hotel Ballroom, Saint Louis, Missouri | |
| 31 | Win | 29–2 | (United States) Andrew Maynard | TKO | 11 (12) | Jan 10, 1992 | (United States) Paramount Theatre, New York | Won NABF light-heavyweight title. |
| 30 | Win | 28–2 | (Italy) Yawe Davis | SD | 12 (12) | 03/08/1991 | (Italy) Palazzetto dello Sport, Selvino | Retained IBF Intercontinental light-heavyweight title. |
| 29 | Win | 27–2 | (Jamaica) Uriah Grant | UD | 12 (12) | 10/02/1991 | (United States) Trump Castle, Atlantic City | Won IBF Intercontinental light-heavyweight title. |
| 28 | Win | 26–2 | (United States) Greg Everett | TKO | 7 (10) | 27/09/1990 | (United States) Waterloo Village, Stanhope | |
| 27 | Win | 25–2 | (United States) William Clayton | TKO | 6 (10) | 05/05/1990 | (United States) Brown County Veterans Memorial Arena, Green Bay | |
| 26 | Loss | 24–2 | (United States) Lindell Holmes | MD | 12 (12) | 27/01/1990 | (United States) Municipal Auditorium, New Orleans | For vacant IBF super-middleweight title. |
| 25 | Win | 24–1 | (United States) Jimmy Bills | UD | 10 (10) | 24/01/1989 | (United States) Four Seasons Arena, Great Falls | |
| 24 | Loss | 23–1 | (United States) Michael Nunn | TKO | 9 (15) | 28/07/1988 | (United States) Caesars Palace, Sports Pavilion, Las Vegas | Lost IBF middleweight title. |
| 23 | Win | 23–0 | (United States) Sanderline Williams | UD | 10 (10) | 21/05/1988 | (United States) George R Brown Convention Center, Houston | |
| 22 | Win | 22–0 | (United Kingdom) Tony Sibson | TKO | 10 (12) | 07/02/1988 | (United Kingdom) Bingley Hall, Stafford | Retained IBF middleweight title. |
| 21 | Win | 21–0 | (Canada) Michael Olajide | UD | 15 (15) | 10/10/1987 | (United States) Caesars Palace, Sports Pavilion, Las Vegas | Won vacant IBF middleweight title. |
| 20 | Win | 20–0 | (United States) James Williams | TKO | 6 (8) | 10/09/1987 | (United States) Houston, Texas | |
| 19 | Win | 19–0 | (United States) Troy Darrell | UD | 12 (12) | 12/07/1987 | (United States) Sands Casino Hotel, Atlantic City | Won USBA middleweight title. |
| 18 | Win | 18–0 | (United States) Mark McPherson | TKO | 6 (10) | 10/05/1987 | (United States) Sands Casino Hotel, Atlantic City | |
| 17 | Win | 17–0 | (United States) Marvin Mack | UD | 10 (10) | 27/03/1987 | (United States) Harrah's Marina Hotel Casino, Atlantic City | |
| 16 | Win | 16–0 | (United Kingdom) Winston Burnett | TKO | 8 (8) | 04/03/1987 | (United Kingdom) Festival Hall Super Tent, Basildon | |
| 15 | Win | 15–0 | (United States) Kevin Watts | MD | 10 (10) | 26/12/1986 | (United States) Trump Plaza Hotel, Atlantic City | |
| 14 | Win | 14–0 | (United States) Curtis Parker | UD | 10 (10) | 22/08/1986 | (United States) Trump Plaza Hotel, Atlantic City | |
| 13 | Win | 13–0 | (Guyana) Brian Muller | TKO | 7 (10) | 27/06/1986 | (United States) Sands Casino Hotel, Atlantic City | |
| 12 | Win | 12–0 | (United States) Ricky Stackhouse | TKO | 6 (10) | 24/04/1986 | (United States) Houston, Texas | |
| 11 | Win | 11–0 | (United States) Jerry Williams | UD | 10 (10) | 16/02/1986 | (United States) Rensselaer Polytechnic Institute, Troy, New York | |
| 10 | Win | 10–0 | (United States) Randy Smith | UD | 8 (8) | 18/01/1986 | (United States) Sands Casino Hotel, Atlantic City | |
| 9 | Win | 9–0 | (United States) Bruce Calloway | TKO | 3 (8) | 13/11/1985 | (United States) Ramada-Houston Hotel, Houston | |
| 8 | Win | 8–0 | (United States) Thomas Smith | UD | 6 (6) | 11/08/1985 | (United States) Hollywood Palladium, Hollywood | |
| 7 | Win | 7–0 | (United States) David Barrow | UD | 6 (6) | 05/06/1985 | (United States) Atlantis Hotel & Casino, Atlantic City | |
| 6 | Win | 6–0 | (United States) Calvin Prejean | TKO | 4 (6) | 09/04/1985 | (United States) Hyatt Regency Downtown, Houston | |
| 5 | Win | 5–0 | (United States) Ron Lee Warrior | KO | 2 (6) | 18/03/1985 | (United States) Hyatt Regency Hotel, Houston | |
| 4 | Win | 4–0 | (United States) Carl Orville | TKO | 2 (6) | 04/03/1985 | (United States) Landmark Hotel, Metairie | |
| 3 | Win | 3–0 | (United States) Phil Jones | KO | 4 (6) | 17/02/1985 | (United States) Hyatt Regency Hotel, Houston | |
| 2 | Win | 2–0 | (United States) Joe McKnight | KO | 5 (6) | 18/01/1985 | (United States) Summit, Houston | |
| 1 | Win | 1–0 | (United States) Mike Pucciarelli | TKO | 1 (6) | 07/12/1984 | (United States) Houston | Professional debut. |

== See also ==
- List of world middleweight boxing champions

Sporting positions
Amateur boxing titles
| Previous: Sanderline Williams | Golden Gloves light middleweight champion 1983 | Next: Ron Essett |
| Previous: Dennis Milton | U.S. light middleweight champion 1983 | Next: Kevin Bryant |
Regional boxing titles
| Preceded by Andrew Maynard | NABF Light heavyweight champion January 10, 1992 – 1992; Vacated | Vacant Title next held by Egerton Marcus |
World boxing titles
| Vacant Title last held by Marvin Hagler | IBF middleweight champion October 10, 1987 – July 28, 1988 | Succeeded by Michael Nunn |
