= List of United States national amateur boxing light middleweight champions =

Below is a list of National Amateur Boxing Light Middleweight Champions, also known as United States Amateur Champions, along with the state or region which they represented. This category was recently discontinued. The United States National Boxing Championships bestow the title of United States Amateur Champion on amateur boxers for winning the annual national amateur boxing tournament organized by USA Boxing, the national governing body for Olympic boxing and is the United States' member organization of the International Amateur Boxing Association (AIBA). It is one of four premier amateur boxing tournaments, the others being the National Golden Gloves Tournament, which crowned its own amateur light middleweight champion, the Police Athletic League Tournament, and the United States Armed Forces Tournament, all sending champions to the US Olympic Trials.

- 1952 - Tony Anthony, New York, New York
- 1953 - William Collins, Springville, New York
- 1954 - John Houston, Oakland, California
- 1955 - Frank Davis, Air Force
- 1956 - Frank Davis, Air Force
- 1957 - Denny Moyer, Portland, OR
- 1958 - Denny Moyer, Portland, OR
- 1959 - Wilbert McClure, Toledo, Ohio
- 1960 - Wilbert McClure, Toledo, Ohio
- 1961 - Bobby Pasquale, Tacoma, WA
- 1962 - Roy McMillan, Toledo, Ohio
- 1963 - Johnny Howard, Portland, OR
- 1964 - Tolman Gibson, Spokane, WA
- 1965 - C. Williams, Homestead, Pennsylvania
- 1966 - Johnny Howard, Portland, OR
- 1967 - Arthur Davis, Air Force
- 1968 - William Beeler, Louisville. Kentucky
- 1969 - Larry Carlisle, Marines
- 1970 - Jesse Valdez, Air Force
- 1971 - Billy Daniels, Norfolk, Virginia
- 1972 - Henry Johnson, Indianapolis, Indiana
- 1973 - Dale Grant, Tacoma, WA
- 1974 - Jerome Bennett, Air Force
- 1975 - Charles Walker, Mesa, Arizona
- 1976 - J.B. Williamson, Marines
- 1977 - Clint Jackson, Nashville, Tennessee
- 1978 - J.B. Williamson, Marines
- 1979 - Jeff Stoudemire, Cleveland, Ohio
- 1980 - Donald Bowers, Jackson, Tennessee
- 1981 - James Rayford, Navy
- 1982 - Dennis Milton, Bronx, New York (won both spring and winter titles)
- 1983 - Frank Tate, Detroit, Michigan
- 1984 - Kevin Bryant, Army
- 1985 - Tim Littles, Flint, Michigan
- 1986 - Michael Moorer, Monessen, Pennsylvania
- 1987 - Gerald McClellan, Freeport, Illinois
- 1988 - Frankie Liles, Syracuse, New York
- 1989 - Chris Byrd, Flint, Michigan
- 1990 - Paul Vaden, Puyallup, WA
- 1991 - Raúl Márquez, Houston, Texas
- 1992 - Robert Allen, Marines
- 1993 - Wayne Blair, Miami, Florida
- 1994 - Jesse Aquino, Kansas City, Missouri
- 1995 - Jeffrey Clark, Fort Bragg, North Carolina
- 1996 - David Reid, Philadelphia, Pennsylvania
- 1997 - Darnell Wilson, Lafayette, Indiana
- 1998 - Darnell Wilson, Lafayette, Indiana
- 1999 - Darnell Wilson, Lafayette, Indiana
- 2000 - Anthony Hanshaw, Mansfield, Ohio
- 2001 - Sechew Powell, Brooklyn, New York
- 2002 - Jesús González, Glendale, Arizona
- Discontinued
