= Boxing at the 1983 Mediterranean Games =

Boxing competition

- Location: Casablanca, Morocco
- Dates: 11–16 September 1983
- Competitors: 88

Boxing was one of the sports held at the 1983 Mediterranean Games.

== Medalists ==
Event	Gold	Silver	Bronze
Light Flyweight (–48 kg)	Brahim Brahimi (ALG)	Fayek Adly Azab (EGY)	Mohamed Haddad (SYR) Salvatore Todisco (ITA)
Flyweight (–51 kg)	Gamal El-Koumy (EGY)	Ljubiša Simić (YUG)	Salih Karaşahinoğlu (TUR) Mustapha Kouchene (ALG)
Bantamweight (–54 kg)	Abdelhak Achik (MAR)	Talal El Chawa (SYR)	Bellil (ALG) Vukašin Dobrašinović (YUG)
Featherweight (–57 kg)	Noureddine Boughanmi (TUN)	Dragan Konovalov (YUG)	Azzedine Saïd (ALG) Maazaoui (MAR)
Lightweight (–60 kg)	Mustapha Fadli (MAR)	Mehmet Demir (TUR)	Konstantinos Syrras (GRE) Mersaal (EGY)
Light Welterweight (–63.5 kg)	Lotfi Belkhir (TUN)	Mirko Puzović (YUG)	Ghazzal (SYR) Bessam (ALG)
Welterweight (–67 kg)	Khemais Refai (TUN)	Luciano Bruno (ITA)	Sreten Mirković (YUG) Laachira (MAR)
Light Middleweight (–71 kg)	Abdellah Tibazi (MAR)	Ahmet Candaş (TUR)	Romolo Casamonica (ITA) Christophe Tiozzo (FRA)
Middleweight (–75 kg)	Raouf Harbi (TUN)	Hussein Kurdieh (SYR)	Hadi (MAR) Nusret Redžepi (YUG)
Light Heavyweight (–81 kg)	Mustapha Moussa (ALG)	Mohamed El Sayed (EGY)	Abdesetar Bahri (TUN) Antonio Manfredini (ITA)
Heavyweight (–91 kg)	Mohamed Bouchiche (ALG)	Angelo Musone (ITA)	Helmy (EGY) Xhevdet Peci (YUG)

== Medal table ==
Rank	Nation	Gold	Silver	Bronze	Total
1	Tunisia (TUN)	4	0	1	5
2	Algeria (ALG)	3	0	4	7
3	Morocco (MAR)	3	0	3	6
4	Egypt (EGY)	1	2	2	5
5	Yugoslavia (YUG)	0	3	4	7
6	Italy (ITA)	0	2	3	5
7	Syria (SYR)	0	2	2	4
8	Turkey (TUR)	0	2	1	3
9	France (FRA)	0	0	1	1
9	Greece (GRE)	0	0	1	1
Totals (10 entries)		11	11	22	44
