= Tim Littles =

American boxer

Tim Littles (born November 2, 1964, in Sharon, Connecticut) was an American boxer in the super middleweight division.

== Amateur career ==
Known as "The Doctor of Styles", Littles had a successful amateur career.

=== Amateur highlights ===
- 1985 United States Amateur Light middleweight champion.
- 1989 Won Amateur World Championship over Torsten Schmitz from Germany in a 5-round World Championship bout in Casablanca, Morocco before turning Pro on November 13, 1989

== Professional career ==
Littles turned pro in 1989 and became a super middleweight contender during the early to mid 1990s. His name will forever be linked with his nemesis Frankie Liles who was the WBA super middleweight champion for a stretch during the 1990s. The two fought 3 times as amateurs, starting a rivalry between the two men that would last the rest of their careers. Of the three times they fought as amateurs, Liles won every fight.

Around the same time Liles also turned pro and made their way up the rankings around the same pace. It seemed inevitable they would clash again. Littles and Liles were both fringe contenders, unbeaten, and on the verge of cracking the top ten when they met for the first time in the pro ranks. Littles would win by a 12-round decision, avenging his losses as an amateur and securing his standing as a legit contender as a pro. Liles would rebound very well after the loss, winning the WBA title from Steve Little and scoring wins over Merqui Sosa and Michael Nunn. Littles also earned himself a title shot, but he was matched much tougher than Liles was when he received his title shot; pound for pound entrant James Toney stopped Littles in the fourth round, giving him his first defeat.

Tim had two comeback fights, both KO wins, and then challenged his old rival one last time for Liles' piece of the title. Liles accepted the challenge and on June 8, 1996, a war was waged, which Liles won on a third-round TKO. This was the end of their rivalry and also effectively ended Tim Littles' career. Apart from his win over Liles, Littles' best wins were over Antoine Byrd and John Scully. All three of those bouts happened in succession in what can be considered Tim's prime.

== Professional boxing record ==
27 Wins (18 knockouts, 9 decisions), 3 Losses (3 knockouts)
Result	Record	Opponent	Type	Round	Date	Location	Notes
Loss	22-3	(United States) Derrick Harmon	TKO	2	03/11/2002	(United States) Table Mountain Casino, Friant, California	Referee stopped the bout at 1:59 of the second round.
Loss	28-1	(United States) Frankie Liles	TKO	3	08/06/1996	(United Kingdom) Telewest Arena, Newcastle upon Tyne	WBA Super Middleweight Title. Referee stopped the bout at 2:58 of the third round.
Win	19-9	(Kenya) Chris Sande	TKO	3	09/03/1996	(Republic of Ireland) Green Glens Arena, Millstreet, Ireland	
Win	17-9	(United States) Mike Belcher	TKO	1	29/07/1995	(United States) Rosemont Horizon, Rosemont, Illinois	
Win	5-9-1	(United States) Caseny Truesdale	TKO	5	17/03/1995	(United States) Worcester Memorial Auditorium, Worcester, Massachusetts	
Loss	41-0-2	(United States) James Toney	TKO	4	Mar 5, 1994	(United States) Olympic Auditorium, Los Angeles	IBF Super Middleweight Title. Referee stopped the bout at 1:03 of the fourth round.
Win	15-10-1	(United States) James Williamson	TKO	7	03/11/1993	(United States) Biloxi, Mississippi	
Win	9-4-1	(United States) Warren Williams	UD	10	19/06/1993	(United States) The Summit, Houston, Texas	
Win	24-5-1	(Venezuela) Armando Rodriguez	TKO	1	25/05/1993	(United States) The Palace, Auburn Hills, Michigan	IBF USBA Super Middleweight Title.
Win	11-9-2	(United States) Lenzie Morgan	UD	12	28/01/1993	(United States) IMA Sports Arena, Flint, Michigan	IBF USBA Super Middleweight Title.
Win	27-2	(United States) Iceman John Scully	UD	12	13/11/1992	(United States) Thomas & Mack Center, Las Vegas, Nevada	IBF USBA Super Middleweight Title.
Win	21-0	(United States) Frankie Liles	UD	12	07/07/1992	(United States) Hollywood Palladium, Hollywood, California	IBF USBA Super Middleweight Title.
Win	19-3-1	(United States) Antoine Byrd	PTS	12	03/03/1992	(United States) HemisFair Arena, San Antonio, Texas	IBF USBA Super Middleweight Title.
Win	6-5	(United States) Willie Douglas	PTS	6	Jan 18, 1992	(United States) Pennsylvania Hall, Philadelphia	
Win	7-5-1	(United States) Kenny Payne	TKO	4	23/11/1991	(United States) The Omni, Atlanta	
Win	8-13-3	(United States) Jerome Kelly	TKO	5	17/09/1991	(United States) The Palace, Auburn Hills, Michigan	
Win	2-10	(United States) Ernest Perry	TKO	1	27/07/1991	(United States) Norfolk Scope, Norfolk, Virginia	
Win	0-1	(Mexico) Ricardo Villa	TKO	4	18/05/1991	(United States) Reno-Sparks Convention Center, Reno, Nevada	
Win	0-5	(Mexico) Quirino Garcia	KO	3	09/04/1991	(United States) The Palace, Auburn Hills, Michigan	
Win	11-9	(Cuba) Ali Sanchez	TKO	7	23/02/1991	(United States) Caesars Palace, Las Vegas, Nevada	Referee stopped the bout at 1:02 of the seventh round.
Win	6-2	(United States) Willie Douglas	UD	8	21/01/1991	(United States) Harrah's Marina, Atlantic City, New Jersey	
Win	8-9-1	(United States) Sylvester White	KO	1	12/11/1990	(United States) Lakefront Arena, Baton Rouge, Louisiana	
Win	7-12-1	(United States) Danny Mitchell	PTS	8	17/09/1990	(United States) Atlantic City, New Jersey	
Win	13-9-1	(United States) Steve Langley	UD	8	05/08/1990	(United States) Trump Plaza Hotel and Casino, Atlantic City, New Jersey	
Win	--	(Mexico) Juan Ramon Perez	TKO	1	08/07/1990	(United States) Harrah's Reno, Reno, Nevada	Referee stopped the bout at 1:55 of the first round.
Win	2-6	(United States) Larry Wilkins	TKO	1	01/06/1990	(United States) Boardwalk Hall, Atlantic City, New Jersey	
Win	2-0	(United States) Tommy Clark	TKO	2	19/05/1990	(United States) Caesars Palace, Las Vegas, Nevada	Referee stopped the bout at 2:22 of the second round.
Win	1-6	(United States) Mike Serr	TKO	4	10/03/1990	(United States) The Dunes, Las Vegas, Nevada	Referee stopped the bout at 2:16 of the fourth round.
Win	2-2	(United States) John Tobin	TKO	2	29/01/1990	(United States) Trump Plaza Hotel and Casino, Atlantic City, New Jersey	
Win	--	(United States) Joe Wolf	KO	1	13/11/1989	(United States) Central Park Athletic Club, Milwaukee, Wisconsin	
