= Gnohéré =

Gnohéré is both a given name and a surname. Notable people with the name include:

- Gnohere Krizo (born 1997), Ivorian footballer
- Gnohere Sery (born 1960), Ivorian boxer
- Arthur Gnohéré (born 1978), Ivorian footballer
- Harlem Gnohéré (born 1988), French footballer
