= Augustino Marial =

Sudanese boxer

Personal information
- Nationality: Sudanese

Sport
- Sport: Boxing

Augustino Marial is a Sudanese boxer. He competed in the men's light middleweight event at the 1984 Summer Olympics. At the 1984 Summer Olympics, he defeated Fletcher Kapito of Malawi, before losing to An Dal-ho of South Korea.
