= Julio César Chávez vs. Greg Haugen =

Boxing match

The Grand Slam of Boxing: Chávez vs. Haugen
- Date: February 20, 1993
- Venue: Estadio Azteca, Coyoacán, Mexico City, Mexico
- Title(s) on the line: WBC super lightweight title

Tale of the tape
Boxer	Julio César Chávez	Greg Haugen
Nickname	El Gran Campeón Mexicano ("The Great Mexican Champion")	Mutt
Hometown	Ciudad Obregón, Sonora, Mexico	Auburn, Washington, U.S.
Purse	$2,500,000	$1,000,000
Pre-fight record	84–0 (71 KO)	32–4 (1) (16 KO)
Age	30 years, 7 months	32 years, 5 months
Height	5 ft 8 in (173 cm)	5 ft 6 in (168 cm)
Weight	139 1/4 lb (63 kg)	140 lb (64 kg)
Style	Orthodox	Orthodox
Recognition	WBC; Super Lightweight Champion; The Ring; No. 1 Ranked Light Welterweight; The Ring No. 1 ranked pound-for-pound fighter 3-division world champion	WBC; No. 2 Ranked Super Lightweight; The Ring; No. 9 Ranked Light Welterweight; Former lightweight champion

Result
- Chávez wins by 5th-round technical knockout

Julio César Chávez vs. Greg Haugen was a professional boxing match contested on February 20, 1993, for the WBC super lightweight title. The fight was the featured bout on a boxing card promoted by Don King dubbed The Grand Slam of Boxing.

== Background ==
A Chávez–Haugen super lightweight title fight was originally announced in October 1992 to take place on December 5 that same year at Caesars Palace in the Las Vegas Valley. Organized by promoter Don King, the Showtime pay-per-view event was also set to include a WBC super welterweight title fight between Terry Norris and Simon Brown and a WBA super middleweight title rematch between Michael Nunn and Víctor Córdoba. However, only two weeks later, the entire card was cancelled due to rival network HBO airing an episode of HBO World Championship Boxing featuring James Toney, Iran Barkley and Roy Jones Jr. on the same day. On December 1, 1992, King announced a new event billed as The Grand Slam of Boxing scheduled to take place on February 20, 1993, in Estadio Azteca in Chávez's native Mexico. Headlined by Chávez and Haugen, the card was originally announced to once again include the Norris–Brown super welterweight title bout, as well as Julian Jackson defending his WBC middleweight title against Gerald McClellan and a WBC super featherweight title bout between Azumah Nelson and Gabriel Ruelas. However, Jackson was forced to pull out of his fight with McClellan due to an injury to his right hand and that fight was replaced with a WBA super middleweight fight between Nunn and Danny Morgan, while Brown required surgery for a detached retina and was replaced by Maurice Blocker.

Leading up to the event, Haugen, a 25–1 underdog, engaged in frequent trash talk, insulting both Chávez and his home country of Mexico. When asked about his safety should he defeat Chávez before a reported 130,000 of his countrymen Haugen responded "First of all, I don’t think there’s 130,000 Mexicans who can afford to go." Haugen would also ridicule Chávez's 84–0 record, claiming that Chávez's undefeated record was a result of him facing "Nothing but stiffs" during the first 50 fights of his career also remarking "Every one of them was a cab driver from Tijuana."

=== Attendance ===
132,274 spectators attended the event, setting the world record for the largest paid attendance at a boxing event, surpassing the first fight between Jack Dempsey and Gene Tunney at Sesquicentennial Stadium in 1926 which drew 120,557. Only the 1941 Tony Zale–Billy Pryor fight in Milwaukee's Juneau Park, which drew 135,132 was better attended, though that fight was free to the public.

== The fights ==
=== Undercard ===
The preclude to the PPV event saw stoppage wins for Félix Trinidad (WBC:6th, IBF:7th) and Gerald McClellan (The Ring:5th).

=== Nunn vs. Morgan ===
The Grand Slam of Boxing: Nunn vs. Morgan
- Title(s) on the line: WBA super middleweight title

Tale of the tape
Boxer	Michael Nunn	Danny Morgan
Nickname	"Second To Nunn"	"Irish"
Hometown	Davenport, Iowa, U.S.	Minneapolis, Minnesota, U.S.
Pre-fight record	39–1 (25 KO)	39–2 (28 KO)
Age	29 years, 10 months	31 years, 8 months
Height	6 ft 2 in (188 cm)	6 ft 0 in (183 cm)
Weight	168 lb (76 kg)	167 3/4 lb (76 kg)
Style	Southpaw	Orthodox
Recognition	WBA; Super Middleweight Champion; The Ring; No. 2 Ranked Super Middleweight	WBA; No. 12 Ranked Super Middleweight

Result
- Nunn defeats Morgan by 1st round KO

The first world title bout on the card saw WBA and lineal super middleweight champion Michael Nunn make the second defence of his title against No. 12 ranked Danny Morgan.

Nunn had made his first defence only three weeks earlier, scoring a wide unanimous decision in his rematch with former champion Víctor Córdoba on January 30. Nunn was the prohibitive favorite, so much so that there was no betting line.

==== The fight ====
Nunn would score a 1st round knockout of Morgan, dropping him with combination to the head with 30 seconds to go in the round. Morgan make it to his feet but a straight left to the jaw sent him down again and this time he failed to beat the count.

Preceded by vs. Víctor Córdoba II	Michael Nunn's bouts 20 February 1993	Succeeded by vs. Crawford Ashley
Preceded by vs. Steve Collins	Danny Morgan's bouts 20 February 1993	Succeeded by vs. Darrell Miller

=== Nelson vs. Ruelas ===
The Grand Slam of Boxing: Nelson vs. Ruelas
- Title(s) on the line: WBC super featherweight title

Tale of the tape
Boxer	Azumah Nelson	Gabriel Ruelas
Nickname	"The Mighty Warrior"	
Hometown	Accra, Ghana	Mascota, Jalisco, Mexico
Pre-fight record	35–2–1 (26 KO)	33–1 (16 KO)
Age	34 years, 7 months	22 years, 6 months
Height	5 ft 5 in (165 cm)	5 ft 7 in (170 cm)
Weight	127 3/4 lb (58 kg)	129 lb (59 kg)
Style	Orthodox	Orthodox
Recognition	WBC; Super Featherweight Champion; The Ring; No. 1 Ranked Super Featherweight; The Ring No. 8 ranked pound-for-pound fighter 2-division world champion	WBC; No. 1 Ranked Super Featherweight; The Ring; No. 6 Ranked Super Featherweight

Result
- Nelson defeats Ruelas by majority decision

The second title bout saw WBC super featherweight champion Azumah Nelson face Gabriel Ruelas in the ninth defence of his title.

Nelson, a 2-1 favourite to win, was confidant of defeating the 22 year old Ruelas saying "We're going to handle this boy like a baby doll."

==== The fight ====
The bout was largely a tactical affair, with both fighters making the other miss frequently. Nelson landed a big rally at the end of the 1st round and finished the fight strong by landing some of his best punches.

One judge scored even at 115–115, while the other two had it for Nelson 115–114 and 115–113, giving him a majority decision victory. The decision was booed by the partisan Mexican crowd.

==== Aftermath ====
Speaking after the bout Nelson said "I was too strong for the boy. In the 10th, 11th and 12th rounds, I was too strong. That's why I'm the professor and he is the student."

Ruelas meanwhile left the ring immediately after the decision was announced and would later complain about Nelson headbutting him.

Preceded by vs. Calvin Grove	Azumah Nelson's bouts 20 February 1993	Succeeded by vs. Jesse James Leija
Preceded by vs. Jimmy Garcia	Gabriel Ruelas's bouts 20 February 1993	Succeeded by vs. Julio Cesar Herrera

=== Norris vs. Blocker ===
The Grand Slam of Boxing: Norris vs. Blocker
- Title(s) on the line: WBC light middleweight title

Tale of the tape
Boxer	Terry Norris	Maurice Blocker
Nickname	"Terrible"	"Thin Man"
Hometown	Lubbock, Texas, U.S.	Washington, D.C., U.S.
Pre-fight record	33–3 (19 KO)	34–2 (18 KO)
Age	25 years, 8 months	29 years, 9 months
Height	5 ft 9 in (175 cm)	5 ft 11 1/4 in (181 cm)
Weight	151 lb (68 kg)	150 lb (68 kg)
Style	Orthodox	Orthodox
Recognition	WBC; Light Middleweight Champion; The Ring; No. 1 Ranked Light Middleweight; The Ring No. 3 ranked pound-for-pound fighter	IBF; Welterweight Champion; The Ring; No. 3 Ranked Welterweight

Result
- Norris defeats Blocker by 2nd round TKO

The penultimate bout saw WBC light middleweight champion Terry Norris make the eighth defence of his title against IBF welterweight champion Maurice Blocker.

Norris was a 12-1 favourite to beat Blocker with speculation linking him to a superfight against Chávez at the welterweight limit. During the build up Norris would state that "I think I'm the best fighter in the world."

==== The fight ====
Norris knocked down Blocker with a left hand midway through the 1st round. He beat the count but he was knocked down again with a barrage of punches in the end of round. Despite getting to his feet Blocker appeared badly hurt.

Norris continued to dominate early in the 2nd, landing a hard left hand that sent Blocker against the ropes prompting referee Richard Steele to wave the fight off.

==== Aftermath ====
Speaking after the bout Norris said "I'm the best fighter in the world pound for pound. Chavez is not. I really didn't think he needed to stay around too long. He made a lot of noise." He also said that the fight should have gone beyond the 1st round saying "Richard Steele should have stopped it in the 1st round."

Preceded by vs. Pat Lawlor	Terry Norris's bouts 20 February 1993	Succeeded by vs. Troy Waters
Preceded by vs. Luis Garcia	Maurice Blocker's bouts 20 February 1993	Succeeded by vs. Steve Langley

=== Main Event ===
Chávez got off to a quick start, sending Haugen down to the canvas 25 seconds into the first round, and then proceeded to dominate the remainder of the fight. In the fifth round, Chávez would score a second knockdown after landing a combination to Haugen's body just past the midway point of the round. Haugen answered referee Joe Cortez's 10-count and was allowed to continue, but Chávez quickly attacked a clearly hurt and exhausted Haugen when the fight resumed. With Haugen nearly defenseless, Cortez stepped in and ended the fight at 2:02 of the round, giving Chávez the victory by technical knockout.

== Fight card ==
Confirmed bouts:

Weight Class	Weight		vs.		Method	Round	Notes
Super Lightweight	140 lbs.	Julio César Chávez (c)	def.	Greg Haugen	TKO	5/12	^{Note 1}
Super Welterweight	154 lbs.	Terry Norris (c)	def.	Maurice Blocker	TKO	2/12	^{Note 2}
Super Featherweight	130 lbs.	Azumah Nelson (c)	def.	Gabriel Ruelas	MD	12/12	^{Note 3}
Super Middleweight	168 lbs.	Michael Nunn (c)	def.	Danny Morgan	KO	1/12	^{Note 4}
Middleweight	160 lbs.	Gerald McClellan	def.	Tyrone Moore	TKO	2/10
Welterweight	147 lbs.	Félix Trinidad	def.	Pedro Aguirre	TKO	4/10
Featherweight	126 lbs.	Jose Badillo	def.	Adan Vargas	KO	2/6

^Note 1 For WBC Super Lightweight title
^Note 2 For WBC Super Welterweight title
^Note 3 For WBC Super Featherweight title
^Note 4 For WBA Super Middleweight title

== Broadcasting ==
Country	Broadcaster
United Kingdom	Sky Sports
United States	Showtime

Preceded by vs. Marty Jakubowski	Julio César Chávez's bouts 20 February 1993	Succeeded by vs. Silvio Walter Rojas
Preceded by vs. Armando Campas	Greg Haugen's bouts 20 February 1993	Succeeded by vs. Darren Brennan
