= Shawn O'Sullivan =

Canadian boxer (born 1962)

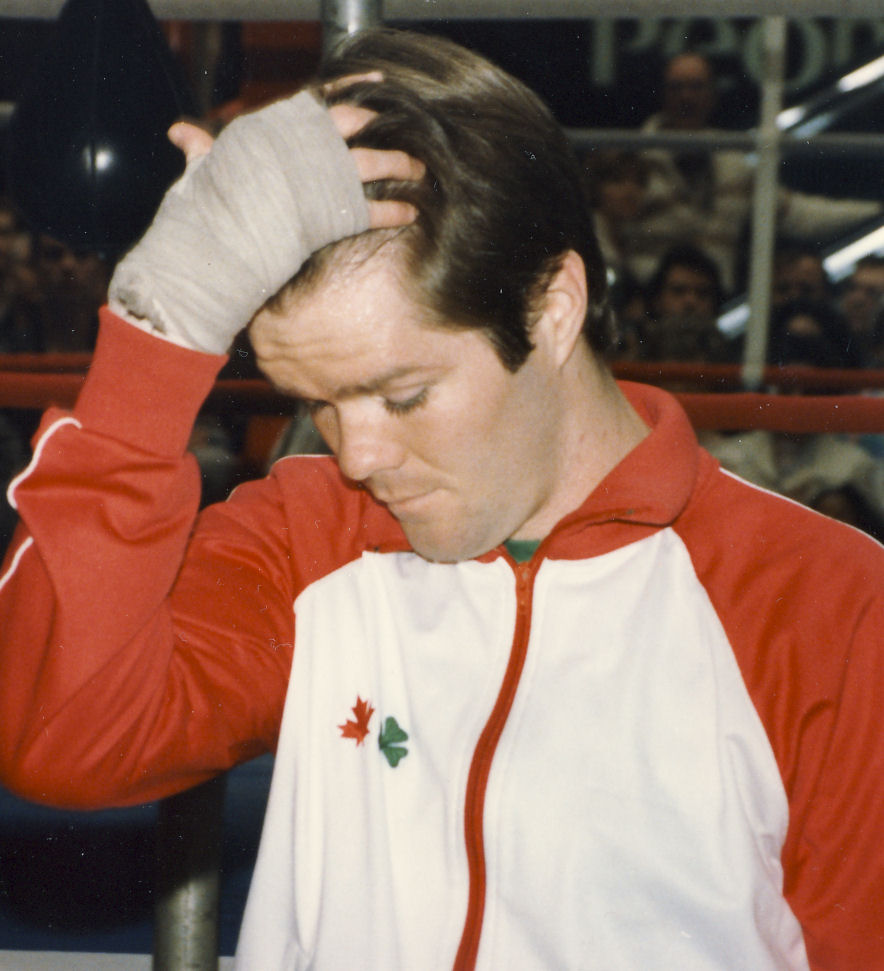

Medal record

Men's Boxing

Representing Canada

Olympic Games
| Silver medal – second place | 1984 Los Angeles | Light Middleweight |

Commonwealth Games
| Gold medal – first place | 1982 Brisbane | Light Middleweight |

World Cup
| Bronze medal – third place | 1983 Rome | Light Middleweight |

Shawn O'Sullivan (born May 9, 1962 in Toronto, Ontario) is a retired Canadian boxer who won gold at the World Amateur Championships in 1981 and the light middleweight silver medal at the 1984 Summer Olympics. He was inducted into Boxing Canada’s Hall of Fame, Class of 2019.

== Background ==
O'Sullivan first learned boxing under his father, Michael, a Toronto bus driver. His first coach was Ken Hamilton. His next teacher was Peter Wylie, a member of the Toronto police department who was a specialist in defusing bombs. He trained at a warehouse in Cabbagetown.

== Amateur highlights ==
- 1981 World Amateur Champion
- 1981 Canadian Athlete of the Year

== Olympics and controversy ==
Leading up the 1984 Olympics, O'Sullivan and fellow Canadian Willie de Wit were both favoured to win the gold medals in their classes: de Wit as a heavyweight and O'Sullivan as a light middleweight.

In the gold medal bout with Frank Tate, O’Sullivan took Tate to two standing-eight-counts in the second round (and nearly a third as the round ended), but the judges unanimously gave the decision to Tate. O'Sullivan dominated the second round; however, four of the judges (Keith Walker of New Zealand, Han Dong Jin of South Korea, Noureddine Addala of Tunisia and Muili Ojo of Nigeria) gave Tate the round by the slim margin of 20-19.

Tate was booed when the gold medal was draped around his neck. Tate had won in a 5-0 decision and even his coach, Emanuel Steward, admitted O'Sullivan may have won. O'Sullivan, who himself had benefited from a controversial decision against Christophe Tiozzo in the semifinals, was gracious in defeat and called the outcome "unfortunate".

His results were:

- 1st round bye
- Defeated Mohamed Halibi (Lebanon) RSC 2
- Defeated Ahn Dal-Ho (South Korea) RSC 1
- Defeated Rod Douglas (Great Britain) 5-0
- Defeated Christophe Tiozzo (France) 5-0
- Lost to Frank Tate (United States) 0-5

== Pro career ==
O'Sullivan began his professional career that same year and won his first 11 bouts in the welterweight division. He lost in his 12th fight to future titlist Simon Brown by TKO in the 3rd in 1986 in Toronto's Exhibition Place. The bout was televised nationally in the United States by NBC. O'Sullivan injured his right hand in the first round, but he was clearly outclassed by the more experienced Brown. O'Sullivan later underwent surgery to repair torn knuckle joints.

O'Sullivan quit boxing in 1988 after consecutive defeats to Luis Santana and Donovan Boucher, but he launched a pair of short-lived comebacks in 1991 and 1996. He retired in 1997 with a record of 23-5-0, with 16 knockouts. Four of his five career defeats were by knockout.

== Life after boxing ==
In May, 2007, O'Sullivan's apartment was broken into and the thieves made off with nine rings. They included: a world championship ring with a diamond signifying a second title — he won in both 1981 and 1983; rings from the Commonwealth Games; one from his high school, St. Mike’s, in Toronto; a Canadian championship ring; a cheap childhood ring bearing his initials, S.O.S.; and a claddagh ring, bearing an Irish symbol of two hands clutching a heart topped with a crown. Since retiring from boxing, he has been diagnosed with brain damage, as a cumulative result of blows to the head during his celebrated boxing career. On February 10, 2010, O'Sullivan carried the 2010 Olympic torch on a stretch through Vancouver. As of 2017, he was living in Newmarket, Ontario.

On September 24, 2015, O'Sullivan was inducted into the Ontario Sports Hall of Fame in Toronto.
