= List of U.S. national Golden Gloves light middleweight champions =

This is a list of United States national Golden Gloves champions in the light middleweight division, along with the state or region they represented. The weight limit for light middleweights was contested at 156 lb (71 kg) until the division was discontinued after 2003.

- 1967 - Jesse Valdez - Fort Worth, TX
- 1968 - William Beeler - Louisville, KY
- 1969 - Morris Jordan - Cincinnati, OH
- 1970 - William Beeler - Louisville, KY
- 1971 - Sammy NeSmith - Indianapolis, IN
- 1972 - Lamont Lovelady - Iowa
- 1973 - Dale Grant - Tacoma, WA
- 1974 - Michael Spinks - St. Louis, MO
- 1975 - Ray Phillips - Fort Worth, TX
- 1976 - Peter "Butch" Bouchard - Fitchburg, MA
- 1977 - Curtis Parker - Philadelphia, PA
- 1978 - Donald Bowers - Jackson, TN
- 1979 - James Shuler - Philadelphia, PA
- 1980 - James Shuler - Philadelphia, PA
- 1981 - Alfred Mayes - St. Louis, MO
- 1982 - Sanderline Williams - Cleveland, OH
- 1983 - Frank Tate - Detroit, MI
- 1984 - Ron Essett - Indiana
- 1985 - Mylon Watkins - Las Vegas, NV
- 1986 - Mylon Watkins - Las Vegas, NV
- 1987 - Roy Jones Jr., Pensacola, FL
- 1988 - Ray McElroy - Los Angeles, CA
- 1989 - Mario Munoz
- 1990 - Ravea Springs - Cincinnati, OH
- 1991 - Kevin Bonner - Nevada
- 1992 - Lonnie Bradley - New York, NY
- 1993 - Darnell Wilson - Indiana
- 1994 - Mike Nunnally - Milwaukee, WI
- 1995 - Randie Carver - Kansas City, MO
- 1996 - Dwain Williams - California
- 1997 - Cleveland Corder - Idaho
- 1998 - Jermain Taylor - Little Rock, AR
- 1999 - Jermain Taylor - Little Rock, AR
- 2000 - Sechew Powell - WI
- 2001 - Andre Berto - FL
- 2002 - Jesse Briseno - MI
- 2003 - Gralon Johnson - St. Louis, MO
