= Christophe Tiozzo =

French boxer

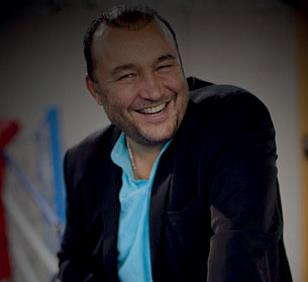

Personal information
- Nationality: French
- Born: June 1, 1963 (age 63) Saint-Denis, Seine-Saint-Denis, France
- Height: 6 ft 0 1/2 in (184 cm)
- Weight: Middleweight; Super middleweight

Boxing career
- Stance: Orthodox

Boxing record
- Total fights: 35
- Wins: 33
- Win by KO: 23
- Losses: 2
Medal record
Men's Boxing
Representing France
Olympic Games
Bronze medal – third place	Los Angeles 1984	Light Middleweight
Mediterranean Games
Bronze medal – third place	Casablanca 1983	Light Middleweight

Christophe Tiozzo (born June 1, 1963) is a French former professional boxer who held the lineal and WBA super middleweight championship. In amateur boxing, Tiozzo won a bronze medal at the 1984 Summer Olympics. He is the older brother of former two-division world champion of boxing, Fabrice Tiozzo.

== Amateur boxing career ==
Record:85–6–2 (24)
1982 French National Championship Light Middleweights: Gold Medalist

- Defeated Alain Cuvillier
- Defeated Fabien Khodri
- Defeated Did-Ali Lokchiri
- Defeated Patrick Magnetto

1982 European Junior Championship at Schwerin, Germany as a Light Middleweight

- Defeated Graciano Rocchigiani (Federal Republic of Germany)
- Lost to Shararov (USSR)

1983 French National Championship as a Light Middleweight: Gold Medalist

- Defeated Bernard Razzano TKO 3
- Defeated Jean-Luc Charme TKO 2
- Defeated Gilbert Dele TKO 3
- Defeated Michel Moukory kot 3

1983: European Championship at Varna as a Light Middleweight

- Lost to Ralf Hunger (Democratic Republic of Germany)

1984 French National Championship as a Middleweight: Bronze Medalist

- Defeated Jean-Max Delnard
- Lost to François Berardino by forfeit

1984 Olympic Games at Los Angeles, California, USA as a Light Middleweight: Bronze Medalist

- Defeated Suleymana Sadik (Ghana) points
- Defeated Vicky Byarubaga (Uganda) points
- Defeated Israel Cole (Sierra Leone) points
- Lost to Shawn O'Sullivan (Canada) points

1985: French National Championship as a Middleweight: Gold Medalist

- Defeated Pascal Stroh AB 2
- Defeated Christophe Girard TKO 2
- Defeated Moktar Bekheira
- Defeated Hamedidi Maimoun

1985: European Championship at Budapest, Hungary as a Middleweight

- Defeated Boliguzov (USSR)
- Defeated Maricescu (Romania) (Eliminated for failing drug test)

== Professional boxing career ==
Tiozzo began his professional boxing career in 1985 and won his first 28 bouts, winning the WBA and Lineal Super Middleweight Titles by beating In-Chul Baek in 1990 by TKO. Tiozzo successfully defended the belt twice, losing it in 1991 to Víctor Córdoba by 9th-round TKO. In 1992 he challenged WBC Light Heavyweight Title holder Jeff Harding, but lost by TKO. He retired in 1996 with a record of 33-2-0.

== Professional boxing record ==
35 fights	33 wins	2 losses
By knockout	23	2
By decision	10	0

No.	Result	Record	Opponent	Type	Round, time	Date	Location	Notes
35	Win	33–2	Philippe Michel	PTS	8 (8)	04/05/1996	Villeurbanne, Rhône, France	
34	Win	32–2	Carlos Bates	KO	2 (8)	24/03/1996	Salle Leyrit, Nice, Alpes-Maritimes, France	
33	Win	31–2	Robert Straw	KO	3 (8)	26/10/1995	Bron, Rhône, France	
32	Loss	30–2	Jeff Harding	TKO	8 (12)	05/06/1992	Palais des Sports, Marseille, France	For WBC light heavyweight title
31	Win	30–1	Kenny Schaefer	TKO	2 (10)	08/11/1991	Halle Georges Carpentier, Paris, France	
30	Win	29–1	Lenzie Morgan	MD	10 (10)	02/08/1991	Palais des Festivals, Cannes, Alpes-Maritimes, France	
29	Loss	28–1	Victor Cordoba	TKO	9 (12)	05/04/1991	Palais des Sports, Marseille, France	Lost WBA and lineal super middleweight titles
28	Win	28–0	Danny Morgan	TKO	2 (12)	23/11/1990	Hall de Cergy, Cergy-Pontoise, Val-d'Oise, France	Retained WBA and lineal super middleweight titles
27	Win	27–0	Paul Whittaker	TKO	8 (12)	20/07/1990	Arènes d'Arles, Arles, Bouches-du-Rhône, France	Retained WBA and lineal super middleweight titles
26	Win	26–0	Baek In-chul	TKO	6 (12)	30/03/1990	Palais des Sports de Gerland, Lyon, France	Won WBA and lineal super middleweight titles
25	Win	25–0	Carlos Antunes Fonseca	RTD	6 (10)	25/11/1989	Casino le Lyon Vert, Lyon, France	
24	Win	24–0	Frank Minton	TKO	8 (?)	29/07/1989	Deauville, Calvados, France	
23	Win	23–0	James Kinchen	UD	10 (10)	31/03/1989	Issy-les-Moulineaux, Hauts-de-Seine, France	
22	Win	22–0	Sylvester White	KO	8 (10)	18/12/1988	Expo Center, Orlando, Florida, U.S.	
21	Win	21–0	Alfonso Redondo	TKO	7 (12)	19/09/1988	Palais des Sports, Corbeil-Essonnes, France	Retained EBU Middleweight Title
20	Win	20–0	Andreas Prox	TKO	10 (12)	13/06/1988	Lyon, Rhône, France	Retained EBU Middleweight Title
19	Win	19–0	Pierre Joly	MD	12 (12)	18/04/1988	Palais des Sports, Paris, France	Won EBU Middleweight Title
18	Win	18–0	Lester Yarbrough	KO	7 (?)	12/03/1988	Montbrison, Loire, France	
17	Win	17–0	Charles Campbell	UD	10 (10)	04/02/1988	Felt Forum, New York City, New York, U.S.	
16	Win	16–0	Carlos Tite	KO	3 (?)	21/12/1987	Stade Pierre de Coubertin, Paris, France	
15	Win	15–0	Jeff Lanas	KO	4 (10)	09/11/1987	Villeurbanne, Rhône, France	
14	Win	14–0	Tim Knight	TKO	4 (8)	17/09/1987	Felt Forum, New York City, New York, U.S.	
13	Win	13–0	John Moore	TKO	7 (10)	09/07/1987	Felt Forum, New York City, New York, U.S.	
12	Win	12–0	Jimmy Cable	KO	5 (?)	06/06/1987	Saint-Nazaire, Loire-Atlantique, France	
11	Win	11–0	Derrick Drane	KO	4 (?)	27/04/1987	Paris, France	
10	Win	10–0	Troy Watson	SD	8 (8)	29/01/1987	Felt Forum, New York City, New York, U.S.	
9	Win	9–0	Andre Mongelema	PTS	8 (8)	13/12/1986	Paris, France	
8	Win	8–0	Jose Rosemain	TKO	5 (?)	07/11/1986	Paris, France	
7	Win	7–0	Tony Jenkins	TKO	5 (8)	25/10/1986	Saint-Nazaire, Loire-Atlantique, France	
6	Win	6–0	Wesley Reid	TKO	4 (8)	09/10/1986	Felt Forum, New York City, New York, U.S.	
5	Win	5–0	Mike Peoples	UD	8 (8)	15/05/1986	Felt Forum, New York City, New York, U.S.	
4	Win	4–0	Jimmy Shavers	PTS	8 (8)	15/03/1986	Stade Louis II, Fontvieille, Monaco	
3	Win	3–0	Danny Vandal	KO	2 (?)	03/02/1986	Paris, France	
2	Win	2–0	Vint Hammock	TKO	3 (6)	08/12/1985	Maurice Richard Arena, Montreal, France	
1	Win	1–0	Karl Barwise	PTS	8 (8)	29/10/1985	Palais Omnisports de Paris-Bercy, Paris, France	

== See also ==
- Notable boxing families
- Lineal championship
- List of world super-middleweight boxing champions

Sporting positions
Regional boxing titles
Preceded by Pierre Joly	EBU middleweight champion April 18, 1988 – 1989; Vacated	Vacant Title next held by Francesco Dell'Aquila
World boxing titles
Preceded by Baek In-chul	WBA super middleweight champion March 30, 1990 – April 5, 1991	Succeeded by Víctor Córdoba
