= Víctor Claudio =

Puerto Rican boxer

Personal information
- Nationality: Puerto Rican
- Born: 15 July 1961 (age 64)

Sport
- Sport: Boxing

Víctor Claudio (born 15 July 1961) is a Puerto Rican boxer. He competed in the men's light middleweight event at the 1984 Summer Olympics. At the 1984 Summer Olympics, he lost to Israel Cole of Sierra Leone.

== Professional boxing career ==
Claudio's professional boxing career was filled with triumphs and defeats. He won his first eight contests, then lost to an undefeated boxer, 6-0 Ron Essett, by an eight-rounds unanimous decision on 20 November 1985.

For his next contest, he met the former WBA world Junior Middleweight champion, Davey Moore, who had 14 wins and 2 losses at the time. When Claudio and Moore fought, on 4 April 1986 at the Caesar's Hotel and Casino in Atlantic City, New Jersey, Moore defeated the Puerto Rican by a second-round knockout.

Claudio had two famous bouts: the first of these came against legendary Panamanian Roberto Duran, who is widely considered one of the top ten boxers of all time. Claudio traded punches with the by then 79 wins and 7 losses Duran on May 16, 1987, at the Convention Center in Miami, in a ten-rounds test that was televised in the United States and to Puerto Rico. Duran dominated the bout and dropped Claudio in round nine, but the Puerto Rican earned critics and fans' praise by lasting the ten rounds with the hard-hitting former three time and future four time world champion. Duran won by a ten-rounds unanimous decision.

Then, on January 14, 1989, Claudio received a world title shot when faced with WBO world Light-Heavyweight champion and future two-time world Heavyweight champion and International Boxing Hall of Fame member Michael Moorer at The Palace, in Auburn Hills, Michigan. Moorer dispatched the challenger by a second-round technical knockout. Moorer, who was 12-0 with all 12 wins by knockout, was in the midst of a 25 fight knockout winning streak, one of the largest of such streaks in boxing history.

Claudio eventually retired with a record of 11 wins and 11 losses in professional boxing, with 7 wins and 7 losses by knockout.
