= Frank Tate vs. Michael Nunn =

Boxing match

Power Struggle
- Date: July 28, 1988
- Venue: Caesars Palace, Paradise, Nevada, U.S.
- Title(s) on the line: IBF middleweight title

Tale of the tape
Boxer	Frank Tate	Michael Nunn
Nickname		Second to (Nunn)
Hometown	Houston, Texas, U.S.	Davenport, Iowa, U.S.
Purse	$400,000	$100,000
Pre-fight record	23–0 (13 KO)	30–0 (20 KO)
Age	23 years, 11 months	25 years, 3 months
Height	6 ft 0 in (183 cm)	6 ft 2 in (188 cm)
Weight	160 lb (73 kg)	160 lb (73 kg)
Style	Orthodox	Southpaw
Recognition	IBF; Middleweight Champion; The Ring; No. 1 Ranked Middleweight	IBF; No. 1 Ranked Middleweight; The Ring; No. 3 Ranked Middleweight; NABF middleweight champion

Result
- Nunn wins via 9th-round TKO

Frank Tate vs. Michael Nunn, billed as Power Struggle, was a professional boxing match contested on July 28, 1988, for the IBF middleweight title.

== Background ==
In April 1988, reigning IBF middleweight champion Frank Tate and the number-one ranked contender Michael Nunn had agreed to terms to fight one another in July of that year. The bout had been in the making since Tate had won the title the previous October, but Tate put off facing the top-ranked Nunn, going as far as to refuse a reported $300,000 payday from Nunn's promoter Bob Arum, and instead made his first defense as the lower-regarded Tony Sibson. Nunn had officially become Tate's mandatory challenger after knocking out Curtis Parker in the second round of an eliminator bout in March 1988. Though Nunn was guaranteed a title shot, Tate was still leery about facing him, causing the IBF to send Tate a letter stating that he would risk being stripped of the title should he not next face Nunn, after which Tate would finally agree to the fight.

Tate and Nunn had previously fought three times as amateurs, with Tate having won two of the fights to Nunn's one. Before the fight, Tate criticized Nunn, known more for his boxing skills than his punching power, stating "I don't think Nunn has what it takes to be a world champion. In order to be IBF champion, he has to fight me, and I don't think he will. I hope he does, then it'll be over early. It'll be an easy fight." Nunn would respond "He's in for a big surprise. I'm the most versatile and talented middleweight in the world."

== The fight ==
Nunn controlled most of the fight, outboxing Tate by using constant movement and using both his height and reach advantage to stymie Tate's offensive attack. Nunn nearly ended the fight during the final seconds of the eighth after landing a combination to Tate's ribs that sent Tate to his knees in pain with Tate barely answering referee Mills Lane's 10-count, getting up at the count of nine. Nunn started the ninth aggressively and sent Tate back into the ropes with a series of punches to the head. With Tate not fighting back, Lane stopped the fight 40 seconds into the round, giving Nunn the technical knockout victory.

== Fight card ==
Confirmed bouts:

Weight Class	Weight		vs.		Method	Round	Notes
Middleweight	160 lbs.	Michael Nunn	def	Frank Tate	TKO	9/15	^{Note 1}
Light Heavyweight	175 lbs.	Tony Willis	def	Frank Minton	TKO	2/12	^{Note 2}
Featherweight	126 lbs.	Pedro Décima	def.	Jesse Benavides	TKO	3/10
Middleweight	160 lbs.	Israel Cole	vs.	Michael Watson	D	2/8
Super Welterweight	154 lbs.	Derrick Rolon	def	Curtis Baker	TKO	2/6
Super Welterweight	154 lbs.	Mike Tramblyn	def.	Harold Springer	UD	4/4

^Note 1 For IBF middleweight title
^Note 2 For NABF light heavyweight title

== Broadcasting ==
Country	Broadcaster
Mexico	Televisa
United Kingdom	BBC
United States	Showtime

Preceded by vs. Sanderline Williams	Frank Tate's bouts 28 July 1988	Succeeded by vs. Jimmy Bills
Preceded by vs. Ron Daniels	Michael Nunn's bouts 28 July 1988	Succeeded by vs. Juan Roldán
