= Frankie Liles =

American boxer

Personal information
- Nickname: Fabulous
- Born: Frank Liles; February 14, 1965 (age 61) Syracuse, New York, U.S.
- Height: 6 ft 2 1/2 in (189 cm)
- Weight: Super middleweight

Boxing career
- Reach: 77 in (196 cm)
- Stance: Southpaw

Boxing record
- Total fights: 36
- Wins: 32
- Win by KO: 19
- Losses: 3
- No contests: 1
Medal record
Men's boxing
Representing United States
Pan American Games
Bronze medal – third place	Indianapolis 1987	Light Middleweight

Frank ("Frankie") Liles (born February 14, 1965) is an American former professional boxer who held the Lineal and WBA super-middleweight titles.

== Amateur career ==
Liles won a bronze medal at the 1987 Pan American Games. Liles had a stellar amateur career, compiling an Amateur Record of 285-14.

=== Amateur Highlights ===
- 1985 3rd place National Golden Gloves as a Welterweight
- 1986 National Golden Gloves Champion as a Welterweight
- 1986 US Olympic Festival Gold Medalist as a Welterweight - Decisioning Lenny Gargagliano Houston Texas
- 1987 Runner-up United States Amateur Championships as a Welterweight
- 1987 3rd place at Pan-American Games as a Light Middleweight
- 1987 United States Amateur Champion at Light Middleweight
- 1988 Runner-up for Olympic team berth at Light Middleweight, was decisioned twice by Roy Jones Jr. after defeating Jones twice in 1987 including a 3-0 decision in which Jones received 2 standing eight counts.

== Professional boxing career ==
Known as "Fabulous", Liles had a very successful pro career that began in 1988. Liles lost to Tim Littles on points in 1992. In 1994 he beat Steve Little to capture the Lineal and WBA super middleweight titles. He successfully defended the title against seven different fighters over a five-year span, including over Michael Nunn, Segundo Mercado and Tim Littles. He tried many times to get a fight with his amateur nemesis Roy Jones Jr. unsuccessfully. He lost his title to Byron Mitchell in 1999 and retired in 2002.

== Professional boxing record ==
36 fights	32 wins	3 losses
By knockout	19	2
By decision	13	1
No contests	1	

No.	Result	Record	Opponent	Type	Round, time	Date	Location	Notes
36	Loss	32–3 (1)	(United States) Demetrius Jenkins	TKO	7 (12)	30/03/2002	(United States) Sovereign Center, Reading, Pennsylvania	For NABO light-heavyweight title.
35	Loss	32–2 (1)	(United States) Byron Mitchell	TKO	11 (12)	12/06/1999	(United States) Aleppo Shriners Auditorium, Wilmington, Massachusetts	Lost WBA and lineal super middleweight titles
34	Win	32–1 (1)	(Russia) Andrey Shkalikov	UD	12	03/04/1998	(Puerto Rico) Coliseo Rubén Rodríguez, Bayamón	Retained WBA and lineal super middleweight titles
33	Win	31–1 (1)	(Togo) Jaffa Ballogou	UD	12	19/07/1997	(United States) Nashville Arena, Nashville, Tennessee	Retained WBA and lineal super middleweight titles
32	Win	30–1 (1)	(Ecuador) Segundo Mercado	TKO	5 (12)	19/04/1997	(United States) Shreveport Municipal Memorial Auditorium, Shreveport, Louisiana	Retained WBA and lineal super middleweight titles
31	Win	29–1 (1)	(United States) Tim Littles	TKO	3 (12)	08/06/1996	(United Kingdom) Telewest Arena, Newcastle upon Tyne	Retained WBA and lineal super middleweight titles
30	Win	28–1 (1)	(Brazil) Mauricio Amaral	UD	12	09/12/1995	(Germany) Hanns-Martin-Schleyer-Halle, Stuttgart	Retained WBA and lineal super middleweight titles
29	Win	27–1 (1)	(France) Frederic Seillier	TKO	6 (12)	27/05/1995	(United States) Broward County Convention Center, Fort Lauderdale, Florida	Retained WBA and lineal super middleweight titles
28	Win	26–1 (1)	(United States) Michael Nunn	UD	12	17/12/1994	(Ecuador) Coliseo General Rumiñahui, Quito	Retained WBA and lineal super middleweight titles
27	Win	25–1 (1)	(United States) Steve Little	UD	12	12/08/1994	(Argentina) Estadio Monumental José Fierro, San Miguel de Tucuman	Won WBA and lineal super middleweight titles
26	Win	24–1 (1)	(United States) Mike Peak	PTS	8	18/03/1994	(United States) MGM Grand Garden Arena, Las Vegas, Nevada	
25	Win	23–1 (1)	(United States) Cecil McKenzie	TKO	8	29/07/1993	(United States) Marriott Hotel, Irvine, California	
24	Win	22–1 (1)	(Dominican Republic) Merqui Sosa	TKO	12	21/10/1992	(United States) Riviera Hotel & Casino, Las Vegas, Nevada	Won NABF super-middleweight title.
23	Loss	21–1 (1)	(United States) Tim Littles	UD	12	07/07/1992	(United States) Hollywood Palladium, Hollywood, California	For USBA super-middleweight title.
22	Win	21–0 (1)	(Mexico) Joaquin Felix	KO	1	28/04/1992	(United States) Reseda Country Club, Los Angeles, California	
21	Win	20–0 (1)	(Colombia) Manuel Murillo	KO	3	30/01/1992	(United States) Reseda Country Club, Los Angeles, California	
20	Win	19–0 (1)	(Mexico) Hector Zaragoza	TKO	2	27/08/1991	(United States) Reseda Country Club, Los Angeles, California	
19	Win	18–0 (1)	(United States) Rollin Williams	PTS	8	25/06/1991	(United States) Reseda Country Club, Los Angeles, California	
18	Win	17–0 (1)}	(United States) Ralph Ward	KO	3	01/06/1991	(United States) Radisson Resort, Palm Springs, California	
17	Win	16–0 (1)	(Colombia) Manuel Murillo	KO	3	30/04/1991	(United States) Reseda Country Club, Los Angeles, California	
16	Win	15–0 (1)	(United States) LJ James Canty	TKO	2	31/03/1991	(United States) Sands Hotel and Casino, Las Vegas, Nevada	
15	Win	14–0 (1)	(United States) Robert Carson	PTS	6	26/02/1991	(United States) Reseda Country Club, Los Angeles, California	
14	Win	13–0 (1)	(United States) Tim Williams	KO	1	28/01/1991	(United States) Reseda Country Club, Los Angeles, California	
13	Win	12–0 (1)	(United States) Mike Peoples	PTS	8	27/11/1990	(United States) The Palace of Auburn Hills, Auburn Hills, Michigan	
12	Win	11–0 (1)	(United States) Robert Curry	TKO	4	30/10/1990	(United States) The Palace of Auburn Hills, Auburn Hills, Michigan	
11	Win	10–0 (1)	(United States) James Johnson	KO	1	24/08/1990	(United States) Hyatt Regency Dearborn, Dearborn, Michigan	
10	Win	9–0 (1)	(United States) Joe Clark	PTS	6	26/04/1990	(United States) Resorts Casino Hotel, Atlantic City, New Jersey	
9	Win	8–0 (1)	(United States) Carlton Brown	KO	3	10/03/1990	(United States) Bristol, Tennessee	
8	Win	7–0 (1)	(United States) Martin Amarillas	UD	6	22/01/1990	(United States) Great Western Forum, Inglewood, California	
7	Win	6–0 (1)	(United States) James Flowers	PTS	4	12/10/1989	(United States) The Palace of Auburn Hills, Auburn Hills, Michigan	
6	Win	5–0 (1)	(United States) William Clayton	KO	1	17/08/1989	(United States) The Palace of Auburn Hills, Auburn Hills, Michigan	
5	Win	4–0 (1)	(United States) Richard Stephens	KO	4	11/08/1989	(United States) Point Cadet Plaza, Biloxi, Mississippi	
4	NC	3–0 (1)	(United States) Tim Long	NC	1	23/02/1989	(United States) The Palace of Auburn Hills, Auburn Hills, Michigan	
3	Win	3–0	(United States) Eric Mustafa Cole	PTS	6	14/01/1989	(United States) The Palace of Auburn Hills, Auburn Hills, Michigan	
2	Win	2–0	(United States) Barry Morris	KO	1	08/12/1988	(United States) Cobo Arena, Detroit, Michigan	
1	Win	1–0	(United States) Jeff Kennedy	KO	1	18/11/1988	(United States) Hilton Hotel Grand Casino Room, Biloxi, Mississippi	

== Career as a trainer ==
Liles worked as a trainer for the Japanese kickboxing organization called K-1 from 2003–2009. He spent a great deal of time training athletes oversees, mostly in Japan. Liles was the head trainer for several K-1 fighters including Musashi, Remy Bonjasky, & Bob Sapp. Liles has also worked with many boxers including the likes of Manny Pacquiao, whose trainer Freddie Roach was Frankie's trainer for much of his career.

== See also ==
- List of world super-middleweight boxing champions

Sporting positions
Amateur boxing titles
Previous: Anthony Stephens	Golden Gloves; Welterweight champion 1986	Next: Roger Turner
Previous: Gerald McClellan	U.S. light middleweight champion 1988	Next: Chris Byrd
Regional boxing titles
Vacant Title last held by Michael Nunn	NABF Super middleweight champion October 21, 1992 – 1993; Vacated	Vacant Title next held by Warren Williams
World boxing titles
Preceded by Steve Little	WBA Super middleweight champion August 12, 1994 – June 12, 1999	Succeeded by Byron Mitchell
