= Xhevdet Peci =

Kosovan and formerly Yugoslav boxer (1955–2022)

Personal information
- Born: 17 April 1955 Zhazha, Mitrovica, SFR Yugoslavia (present-day Kosovo)
- Died: 9 May 2022 (aged 67) United States
- Weight: 91 kg (201 lb)

Sport
- Sport: Boxing
- Club: Akumulatori (1971–1973); Prishtina (1973–1986)
- Coached by: Lah Nimani
- Retired: 1986
Medal record
Representing Yugoslavia
Mediterranean Games
Bronze medal – third place	1983 Casablanca	-91 kg

Xhevdet Peci (17 April 1955 – 9 May 2022) was a Kosovan and formerly Yugoslav heavyweight boxer and coach. With KB Prishtina he was declared champion many times.

== Biography ==
Xhevdet Peci was born on 17 April 1955 in the village Zhazha (back then part of the Mitrovica municipality now Zveçan municipality). He finished the primary school in Mitrovica. He started boxing at the age of 16 for KB Akumulatori from Mitrovica. He then moved to KB Prishtina in 1973–1974. He won five titles there. He won four times the Yugoslavian championship in heavyweight and two times the Balkan championship. Xhevdet Peci ended his career in 1986 after a fight in Podgorica where he beat the Serbian referee after a questionable decision.

He died in 2022 in the United States.
