= Ralph Labrosse =

Seychellois boxer (born 1958)

Personal information
- Nationality: Seychellois
- Born: 4 August 1958 (age 66)

Sport
- Sport: Boxing

Ralph Labrosse (born 4 August 1958) is a Seychellois boxer. He competed in the men's light middleweight event at the 1984 Summer Olympics.
