= Manfred Zielonka =

German boxer

Medal record

Men's boxing

Representing West Germany

Olympic Games
Bronze medal – third place	1984 Los Angeles	Light Middleweight

World Amateur Championships
Bronze medal – third place	1982 Munich	Welterweight

Manfred Zielonka (born 24 January 1960 in Krzyżowa Dolina, Poland) is a retired boxer from West Germany. At the 1984 Summer Olympics he won the bronze medal in the men's light middleweight division (– 71 kg). In the semifinals he was beaten by eventual winner Frank Tate of the United States. He also captured bronze two years earlier at the World Championships in Munich, West Germany.
