= Gheorghe Simion =

Romanian boxer

Personal information
- Nationality: Romanian
- Born: 10 May 1957 (age 69)
- Height: 175 cm (5 ft 9 in)

Sport
- Sport: Boxing
Medal record
Representing Romania
Romania National Amateur Boxing Championships
Silver medal – second place	1977 Bucharest	Light welterweight
Silver medal – second place	1979 Bucharest	Welterweight
Gold medal – first place	1983 Constanța	Light middleweight
European Amateur Championships
Bronze medal – third place	1983 Varna	Light middleweight

Gheorghe Simion (born 10 May 1957) is a Romanian boxer. He competed in the men's light middleweight event at the 1984 Summer Olympics. He also won one national senior title and one bronze medal at the European Amateur Boxing Championships.
