= Jimmi Bredahl vs. Oscar De La Hoya =

Boxing match

- Date: March 5, 1994
- Venue: Grand Olympic Auditorium, Los Angeles, California, U.S.
- Title on the line: WBO Junior Lightweight title

Tale of the tape
Boxer	Jimmi Bredahl	Oscar De La Hoya
Nickname		The Golden Boy
Hometown	Copenhagen, Denmark	East Los Angeles, California, U.S.
Purse	$50,000	$1,000,000
Pre-fight record	16–0 (5 KO)	11–0 (10 KO)
Age	26 years, 6 months	21 years, 1 month
Height	5 ft 10 in (178 cm)	5 ft 7 1/2 in (171 cm)
Weight	130 lb (59 kg)	128 3/4 lb (58 kg)
Style	Southpaw	Orthodox
Recognition	WBO; Junior Lightweight champion The Ring; No. 7 Ranked Junior Lightweight	WBA; No. 4 Ranked Junior Lightweight; IBF/The Ring; No. 6 Ranked Junior Lightweight; WBC; No. 7 Ranked Junior Lightweight; 1992 Olympic Lightweight gold medallist

Result
- De La Hoya wins via 10th-round corner retirement

Jimmi Bredahl vs. Oscar De La Hoya was a professional boxing match contested on March 5, 1994 for the WBO super featherweight title.

== Background ==
Just prior to his ninth professional victory over Renaldo Carter on August 14, 1993, Oscar De La Hoya, then just over a year into his career, announced his intent for his next bout to be his first championship fight tentatively scheduled for later in the year on December 30. Fighting in the super featherweight/junior lightweight division, De La Hoya and his team engaged in talks with then-champions Genaro Hernández (WBA), John John Molina (IBF) and Jimmi Bredahl (the lesser regarded WBO), with Bredahl being picked as his opponent, though the bout was pushed back to early March the following year instead of late December. De La Hoya was scheduled to have a tune-up fight against Jose Vidal Concepcion in what was supposed to be his Madison Square Garden debut before his title fight against Bredahl, but he pulled out of the fight only three days before it was to take place with his promoter Bob Arum citing "undisclosed personal reasons." The reasons for his cancelation were soon revealed to be due to a rift between De La Hoya and his managers Bob Mittleman and Steve Nelson. Dissatisfied with having to give Mittleman and Nelson a 33% cut of his purses and them having almost complete control over his boxing career, De La Hoya chose to sit out the Concepcion fight in order to distance himself from his managers, who had set up the fight. De La Hoya would then ask a Los Angeles superior court for a restraining order against them, leading to Mittleman and Nelson to file a $10 million lawsuit against De La Hoya in turn.

As a result of his withdrawal from the Concepcion fight, De La Hoya risked a 90-day suspension from the New York State Athletic Commission, which would put his still-scheduled title fight against Bredahl in jeopardy. However, NYSAC chairman Randy Gordon stated that the commission would not take action against De La Hoya and that matter was a breach of contract and "in the hands of the promoter." Arum, the promoter in question, declined to pursue legal action against De La Hoya, instead stating his intent was to have De La Hoya eventually agree to return to New York to make up his cancelled fight. Following this, De La Hoya held a press conference in which he publicly fired Mittleman and Nelson and declared that he would be self-managed from then on, though he would proceed with the March 5 fight against Bredahl as well as $7 million deal with HBO that would see the network exclusively air his fights, both of which his now-former managers had helped put together.

The De La Hoya–Bredahl fight was co-headlined with an IBF middleweight title bout between champion James Toney and challenger Tim Littles. The Toney–Littles fight went on before the De La Hoya–Bredahl main event much to the displeasure of Littles' manager and trainer Lou Duva who stated "Toney’s had more fights than both of them combined, and my guy is a great fighter. This should be the main event, no question."

== The fights ==
=== Toney vs. Littles ===
James Toney vs. Tim Littles
- Title on the line: IBF super middleweight title

Tale of the tape
Boxer	James Toney	Tim Littles
Nickname	Lights Out	The Doctor of Styles
Hometown	Grand Rapids, Michigan, U.S.	Flint, Michigan, U.S.
Pre-fight record	41–0–2 (27 KO)	24–0 (15 KO)
Age	25 years, 6 months	29 years, 4 months
Height	5 ft 8 in (173 cm)	5 ft 11 in (180 cm)
Weight	167 3/4 lb (76 kg)	166 1/2 lb (76 kg)
Style	Orthodox	Orthodox
Recognition	IBF; Super Middleweight Champion; The Ring; No. 1 Ranked Super Middleweight; The Ring No. 3 ranked pound-for-pound fighter 2-division world champion	IBF; No. 1 Ranked Super Middleweight; The Ring; No. 5 Ranked Super Middleweight

Result
- Toney defeats Littles by 4th round TKO

The co featured bout saw IBF super middleweight champion make the second defence of his title against top ranked contenter Tim Littles.

During the build up Toney would admit he was looking ahead to a showdown against middleweight champion Roy Jones Jr., stating "My motivation right now is Roy Jones, I’m obsessed with him, I’ve got to have him, I don’t like his pretty-boy image."

==== The fight ====
After two relatively uneventful rounds, Toney would drop Littles for the first time in his career in the third round. Littles beat the count and Toney would spend the rest of the round landing heavy punches on the challenger. Towards the end of the round a large cut opened up on Toney above his left eye following a clash of heads. The ringside doctor would inspect the cut between rounds and reportedly told Toney that he would give the fight one more round before stopping it.

Toney would come out for the fourth firing and drop Littles twice more before referee Pat Russell stopped the bout just over a minute into the round with Toney landing punches at will. As soon as the bout was waved off, Littles toppled over backward and remained motionless on the canvas for several minutes before he was able to get up.

Preceded by vs. Anthony Hembrick	James Toney's bouts 5 March 1994	Succeeded by vs. Vinson Durham
Preceded by vs. James Williamson	Tim Littles's bouts 5 March 1994	Succeeded by vs. Caseny Truesdale

=== Bredahl vs. De La Hoya ===
De La Hoya dominated Bredahl from the start, earning a knockdown in each of the first two rounds, first sending Bredahl to the canvas midway through the first round after landing a big right hand and then again with a minute left in the second after staggering Bredahl with a left and then sending him to his knees after a combination, though he answered the referee's standing 8-count both times. From then on, Bredahl back peddled away from the aggressive De La Hoya, though De La Hoya continued to land jabs and combinations and won each round thereafter. After 10 rounds, Bredahl's right eye had been swollen shut, causing the ring side doctor to suggest to the referee to stop the fight, which it was, giving De La Hoya the victory by technical knockout and the first of eight world titles in six different divisions.

== Aftermath ==
Speaking after the bout De La Hoya said "It was very, very frustrating from the first round on. His style is so awkward. The first few rounds I was trying to adjust to his style. I was studying him and he kept on running. My left hook didn't work because of his stance. Every time I had him hurt, when I was connecting, he would run for his life." Bredahl was impressed by De La Hoya saying "I thought I was good; he's good. My strategy was to kill his stomach, but he killed my face first.

Even though WBO was widely regarded as a minor title at this time, the belt would nevertheless prove to be a stepping stone for De La Hoya towards fighting for a major world title.

== Fight card ==
Confirmed bouts:

Weight Class	Weight		vs.		Method	Round	Notes
Junior Lightweight	130 lbs.	Oscar De La Hoya	def.	Jimmi Bredahl	RTD	10/12	^{note 1}
Super Middleweight	168 lbs.	James Toney	def.	Tim Littles	TKO	4/12	^{note 2}
Super Welterweight	154 lbs.	Bronco McKart	def.	Skipper Kelp	TKO	6/8
Heavyweight	200+ lbs.	Mikael Lindblad	def.	Arturo Lopez	KO	1/6
Heavyweight	200+ lbs.	Brian Nielsen	def.	Ross Puritty	PTS	4/4

^Note 1 For WBO Junior Lightweight title
^Note 2 For IBF Super Middleweight title

== Broadcasting ==
Country	Broadcaster
United States	HBO

Preceded by vs. Steve Hindi	Jimmi Bredahl's bouts 5 March 1994	Succeeded by vs. Jacobin Yoma
Preceded by vs. Narciso Valenzuela	Oscar De La Hoya's bouts 5 March 1994	Succeeded by vs. Giorgio Campanella
