= Ambrose Mlilo =

Zimbabwean boxer (born 1959)

Personal information
- Nationality: Zimbabwean
- Born: 22 December 1959 (age 65)

Sport
- Sport: Boxing

Ambrose Mlilo (born 22 December 1959) is a Zimbabwean boxer. He competed in the men's light middleweight event at the 1984 Summer Olympics.
