= Danny Morgan (boxer) =

American boxer

Personal information
- Nickname: Irish
- Born: Dan Morgan; May 29, 1961 (age 65) Minneapolis, Minnesota, U.S.
- Weight: 168 lb (76 kg)

Boxing career
- Weight class: super middleweight
- Stance: orthodox

Boxing record
- Wins: 40
- Win by KO: 28
- Losses: 4

Danny Morgan (born May 29, 1961) is an American former professional boxer who competed from 1986 to 1993. He twice challenged for the WBA super middleweight title between 1990 and 1993.

== Professional career ==
Morgan made his professional debut against Charles Minty on May 1, 1986, winning by unanimous decision in a six-round bout. Morgan fought an opponent with a winning record for the first time in his fourth professional bout, defeating 14-3-1 Scott Papasadora on points in September 1987. Thereafter Morgan became a frequent sight in US boxing rings, fighting 21 times in 1988, including four times in the month of April alone. During this time Morgan's most notable wins were over 21-1-4 Quinton Fox, 20-10-3 Mike Pollitt, and 29-7-2 Wilbert Johnson. In November 1990 Morgan, sporting a record of 38–0, was matched against 27-0 Christophe Tiozzo for the WBA super middleweight title, a fight which lost by 2nd-round TKO. In the remainder of his career Morgan would lose fights to Steve Collins, Michael Nunn, and Marc Randazzo, while tallying wins against two unknowns. The Randazzo fight would be Morgan's last, and he would retire with a professional record of 40–4 with 28 wins by knockout. Morgan was inducted into the Minnesota Boxing Hall of Fame in 2017.

== Professional boxing record ==
44 fights	40 wins	4 losses
By knockout	28	4
By decision	10	0
By disqualification	2	0

No.	Result	Record	Opponent	Type	Round, time	Date	Location	Notes
44	Loss	40–4	Marc Randazzo	TKO	6 (12)	Dec 6, 1993	Rosemont Horizon, Rosemont, Illinois, U.S.	For vacant WBC Continental Americas cruiserweight title
43	Win	40–3	Darrell Miller	UD	8	May 15, 1993	Veterans Memorial Coliseum, Cedar Rapids, Iowa, U.S.	
42	Loss	39–3	Michael Nunn	KO	1 (12), 2:59	Feb 20, 1993	Estadio Azteca, Mexico City, Mexico	For WBA super middleweight title
41	Loss	39–2	Steve Collins	TKO	3 (10)	Dec 11, 1991	National Stadium, Dublin, Ireland	
40	Win	39–1	Billy Preston	PTS	8	Mar 26, 1991	Sherwood Club, Indianapolis, Indiana, U.S.	
39	Loss	38–1	Christophe Tiozzo	TKO	2 (12), 2:35	Nov 23, 1990	Hall de Cergy, Cergy-Pontoise, France	For WBA super middleweight title
38	Win	38–0	Ramon Torres	RTD	6	May 24, 1990	Central Plaza Hotel, Oklahoma City, Oklahoma, U.S.	
37	Win	37–0	Carlos Santistevan	TKO	4 (10)	Feb 28, 1990	Roy Wilkins Auditorium, Saint Paul, Minnesota, U.S.	
36	Win	36–0	Quinton Fox	TKO	6	Feb 20, 1990	Central Plaza Hotel, Oklahoma City, Oklahoma, U.S.	
35	Win	35–0	Jesse Abrams	UD	10	Feb 5, 1990	Riverside Ballroom, Green Bay, Wisconsin, U.S.	
34	Win	34–0	Darrell Miller	UD	8	Dec 13, 1989	Roy Wilkins Auditorium, Saint Paul, Minnesota, U.S.	
33	Win	33–0	Wilbert Johnson	KO	8 (8), 1:53	Oct 31, 1989	Indianapolis, Indiana, U.S.	
32	Win	32–0	Ron Lee Warrior	TKO	6	Sep 19, 1989	Central Plaza Hotel, Oklahoma City, Oklahoma, U.S.	
31	Win	31–0	Paul Knight	KO	4	Sep 5, 1989	Cebtral Plaza Hotel, Oklahoma City, Oklahoma, U.S.	
30	Win	30–0	Gary Thompson	UD	10	Aug 1, 1989	Central Plaza Hotel, Oklahoma City, Oklahoma, U.S.	
29	Win	29–0	Mike Pollitt	TKO	7 (10), 1:25	May 16, 1989	Tyndall Armory, Indianapolis, Indiana, U.S.	
28	Win	28–0	Tommy Degen	KO	3	Feb 21, 1989	Central Plaza Hotel, Oklahoma City, Oklahoma, U.S.	
27	Win	27–0	Bobby Richardson	UD	10	Jan 16, 1989	Yankee Doodle, Bowling Green, Kentucky, U.S.	
26	Win	26–0	Dean Keene	TKO	11 (12), 1:54	Dec 6, 1988	Central Plaza Hotel, Oklahoma City, Oklahoma, U.S.	
25	Win	25–0	Billy Pryor	KO	2 (10)	Nov 15, 1988	Central Plaza Hotel, Oklahoma City, Oklahoma, U.S.	
24	Win	24–0	Anthony Adams	DQ	3 (6)	Nov 1, 1988	Central Plaza Hotel, Oklahoma City, Oklahoma, U.S.	Adams disqualified for using headlock to throw Morgan to the ground
23	Win	23–0	Quinton Fox	KO	7 (12), 2:17	Oct 18, 1988	Central Plaza Hotel, Oklahoma City, Oklahoma, U.S.	Won vacant Mid American middleweight title
22	Win	22–0	Wilson Douglas	TKO	4	Oct 4, 1988	Central Plaza Hotel, Oklahoma City, Oklahoma, U.S.	
21	Win	21–0	Ronnie Yoe	TKO	6	Sep 27, 1988	Riverboat Admiral, St. Louis, Missouri, U.S.	
20	Win	20–0	Anthony Adams	DQ	4 (8)	Sep 20, 1988	Central Plaza Hotel, Oklahoma City, Oklahoma, U.S.	Adams disqualified for kneeing Mogan in the face
19	Win	19–0	Casey Mcgonigle	KO	2	Sep 13, 1988	Sherwood Club, Indianapolis, Indiana, U.S.	
18	Win	18–0	Rodney Foster	TKO	4	Sep 12, 1988	Holiday Inn, Louisville, Kentucky, U.S.	
17	Win	17–0	Brad Billings	KO	4	Aug 2, 1988	Central Plaza Hotel, Oklahoma City, Oklahoma, U.S.	
16	Win	16–0	Willie Featherstone	TKO	9 (10)	Jul 22, 1988	Holiday Inn Ballroom, Louisville, Kentucky, U.S.	
15	Win	15–0	James Littlejohn	TKO	10 (10), 1:38	Jul 19, 1988	Central Plaza Hotel, Oklahoma City, Oklahoma, U.S.	
14	Win	14–0	Bill Anderson	TKO	3	Jul 5, 1988	Central Plaza Hotel, Oklahoma City, Oklahoma, U.S.	
13	Win	13–0	Lonnie Watkins	TKO	3 (8)	Jun 29, 1988	Rainbow Bars, Sioux Falls, South Dakota, U.S.	
12	Win	12–0	Dick Allen	TKO	4	Apr 14, 1988	State Fair Park 4-H Building, Lincoln, Nebraska, U.S.	
11	Win	11–0	Willis Green	KO	6 (10)	Apr 9, 1988	Joplin, Missouri, U.S.	
10	Win	10–0	Jim Fields	TKO	4 (8), 0:51	Apr 3, 1988	Civic Center, Bismarck, North Dakota, U.S.	
9	Win	9–0	Ronnie Brown	UD	6	Apr 1, 1988	Peony Park Ballroom, Omaha, Nebraska, U.S.	
8	Win	8–0	Wayne Grant	TKO	4 (6), 2:59	Feb 26, 1988	Ramada Inn, Louisville, Kentucky, U.S.	
7	Win	7–0	Billy Pryor	TKO	6 (8)	Feb 22, 1988	T-Bearz, Mobile, Alabama, U.S.	
6	Win	6–0	Wayne Grant	KO	6	Feb 13, 1988	Joplin, Missouri, U.S.	
5	Win	5–0	Tom Lillard	TKO	3 (6)	Dec 18, 1987	Bally's Las Vegas, Paradise, Nevada, U.S.	
4	Win	4–0	Scott Papasadora	UD	6	Sep 10, 1987	Promenade Center Ballroom, Saint Paul, Minnesota, U.S.	
3	Win	3–0	James Robinson	PTS	4	May 1, 1987	City Arena, Grand Forks, North Dakota, U.S.	
2	Win	2–0	Robbie Robinson	TKO	3 (4)	Mar 6, 1987	Civic Auditorium, Fargo, North Dakota, U.S.	
1	Win	1–0	Charles Minty	UD	6	May 1, 1986	Convention Centre, Winnipeg, Canada	

== Exhibition boxing record ==
1 fight	0 wins	0 losses
Non-scored	1	

No.	Result	Record	Opponent	Type	Round, time	Date	Location	Notes
1	—N/a	0–0 (1)	Roberto Durán	—N/a	3	Aug 14, 1989	Lawlor Events Center, Reno, Nevada, U.S.	Non-scored bout; Durán was wearing a headgear
