= Julio César Chávez vs. Héctor Camacho =

Boxing match

Ultimate Glory: The Fight for it All
- Date: September 12, 1992
- Venue: Thomas & Mack Center, Paradise, Nevada, U.S.
- Title(s) on the line: WBC super lightweight title

Tale of the tape
Boxer	Julio César Chávez	Héctor Camacho
Nickname	El Gran Campeón Mexicano ("The Great Mexican Champion")	Macho
Hometown	Ciudad Obregón, Sonora, Mexico	Bayamón, Puerto Rico
Purse	$3,000,000	$3,000,000
Pre-fight record	81–0 (68 KO)	40–1 (18 KO)
Age	30 years, 2 months	30 years, 3 months
Height	5 ft 7 in (170 cm)	5 ft 6 1/2 in (169 cm)
Weight	140 lb (64 kg)	140 lb (64 kg)
Style	Orthodox	Southpaw
Recognition	WBC; Super Lightweight Champion; The Ring; No. 2 Ranked Light Welterweight; The Ring No. 1 ranked pound-for-pound fighter	WBC; No. 2 Ranked Super Lightweight; The Ring; No. 7 Ranked Light Welterweight; 3-division World Champion

Result
- Chávez wins by unanimous decision (120–107, 119–110, 117–111)

Julio César Chávez vs. Héctor Camacho, billed as Ultimate Glory: The Fight for it All, was a professional boxing match contested on September 12, 1992, for the WBC super lightweight title.

== Background ==
A fight between Julio César Chávez and Héctor Camacho, two of the top fighters in the super lightweight division, had been discussed as early as 1989, though problems within Camacho's management team prevented HBO, who then held Chávez's television rights, from making the fight with then-HBO sports head Seth Abraham stating "While I'd love to do the fight, I'm not sure who to make the deal with." After years of rumors and failed negotiations, the Chávez–Camacho fight finally came to fruition in April 1992. After Chávez made a successful mandatory defense against Angel Hernandez, he would challenge Camacho, who was sitting ringside, by yelling "you're next!" at him. The two fighters would then each take tune-up fights on August 1, 1992, in preparation for their showdown scheduled in September that year. Camacho would defeat Eddie Van Kirk followed by Chávez making another successful title defense against Frankie Mitchell, officially putting their fight on. There were concerns that Camacho, who had fought Van Kirk in the light middleweight division at 148 pounds, would have difficulty getting down to the 140-pound super lightweight division and thus make the long-anticipated bout a non-title fight. Promoter Don King would downplay Camacho's rumored troubles, stating they were "not true" and that there was "no question" that Camacho would make weight come the day of the fight. Chávez, then undefeated in 81 professional fights, entered the fight as a heavy 5–1 favorite.

Richard Steele was named the referee of the fight three days prior to it taking place. This was the first time Steele had refereed a Chávez fight since controversially awarding Chávez the victory by technical knockout against Meldrick Taylor after stopping the fight with only two seconds remaining over two years prior.

== The fights ==
=== Undercard ===
The undercard saw wins for Frankie Randall (WBC: 7th) and former heavyweight champion Tony Tucker (WBC: 4th, The Ring: 5th, WBA: 7th, IBF: 9th). Also former WBO heavyweight titleholder Francesco Damiani edged out former heavyweight champion Greg Page by two points on all three cards, where Page lost two points for repeatedly losing his mouthpiece. Without the point deductions the bout would have scored a draw.

=== Córdoba vs. Nunn ===
Ultimate Glory: Víctor Córdoba vs. Michael Nunn
- Title(s) on the line: WBA super middleweight title

Tale of the tape
Boxer	Víctor Córdoba	Michael Nunn
Nickname	"Toby"	"Second To Nunn"
Hometown	Punta Alegre, Darién, Panama	Davenport, Iowa, U.S.
Pre-fight record	19–2–3 (15 KO)	31–1 (25 KO)
Age	30 years, 5 months	29 years, 4 months
Height	6 ft 1 in (185 cm)	6 ft 2 in (188 cm)
Weight	168 lb (76 kg)	168 lb (76 kg)
Style	Southpaw	Orthodox
Recognition	WBA; Super Middleweight Champion; The Ring; No. 2 Ranked Super Middleweight	WBA; No. 1 Ranked Super Middleweight; The Ring; No. 3 Ranked Super Middleweight; Former middleweight champion

Result
- Nunn defeats Córdoba by split decision

In the first of the two world title bouts on the card, WBA and lineal super middleweight champion Víctor Córdoba made the third defence of his title against former middleweight champion and No. 1 contender Michael Nunn.

Nunn was a 9-1 favorite to win.

==== The fight ====
The champion would start strong stinging Nunn repeatedly in the early rounds and nearly knocking down Nunn with a right-left combination in the 2nd round. Nunn would grow into the bout but Córdoba seemed to be landing the harder blows. As the bout passed the halfway mark Córdoba appeared to be slowing down, allowing Nunn more into the fight. Referee Mills Lane would deduct a point from Córdoba for a low blow in the 8th round. However in the following round Córdoba dropped Nunn with a straight left hand while batting in the corner of the ring. Nunn beat the count and would finish the bout strong.

The bout would last the full 12 round distance, judge Patricia Jarman scored it 114–112 for Córdoba while Fernando Viso and Ove Ovesen had it for Nunn, 114–113 and 114–112 respectively.

With the victory Nunn became a two division champion, however the decision was booed by the crowd.

Preceded by vs. Vincenzo Nardiello	Víctor Córdoba's bouts 12 September 1992	Succeeded by Rematch
Preceded by vs. Randall Yonker	Michael Nunn's bouts 12 September 1992	Succeeded by Rematch

=== Main Event ===
Chávez would earn the victory with an extremely lopsided unanimous decision. Chávez served as the aggressor for nearly the entire 12 rounds as the constantly retreating Camacho offered little offense throughout. There were no knockdowns, though Chávez came close to scoring a knockout in the third after hitting Camacho with a left-right-left combination while Camacho was stuck in his corner though Camacho survived the round. By the eighth round, Camacho's left eye was badly swollen after absorbing considerable punishment and Chávez would open a cut alongside Camacho's right eye though Camacho would nevertheless hold on and take Chávez the distance. All three judges had Chávez the clear winner with scores of 120–107 (12 rounds to none), 119–110 (10 rounds to one, one round even) and 117–111 (nine rounds to three)

== Aftermath ==
The bout made between 740,000 and 800,000 PPV buys.

== Fight card ==
Confirmed bouts:

Weight Class	Weight		vs.		Method	Round	Notes
Super Lightweight	140 lbs.	Julio César Chávez (c)	def.	Héctor Camacho	UD	12/12	^{Note 1}
Super Middleweight	168 lbs.	Michael Nunn	def.	Víctor Córdoba (c)	SD	12/12	^{Note 2}
Heavyweight	200+ lbs.	Francesco Damiani	def.	Greg Page	UD	10/10
Heavyweight	200+ lbs.	Tony Tucker	def.	Everett Martin	UD	10/10
Welterweight	147 lbs.	Frankie Randall	def.	Juan Carlos Nunez	TKO	2/10
Cruiserweight	190 lbs.	Richard Mason	def.	Martin Lopez	TKO	3/10
Heavyweight	200+ lbs.	King Ipitan	def.	Barry Forbes	UD	4/4

^Note 1 For WBC Super Lightweight title
^Note 2 For WBA Super Middleweight title

== Broadcasting ==
Country	Broadcaster
United States	Showtime

Preceded by vs. Frankie Mitchell	Julio César Chávez's bouts 12 September 1992	Succeeded by vs. Bruce Pearson
Preceded by vs. Eddie VanKirk	Héctor Camacho's bouts 12 September 1992	Succeeded by vs. Eric Podolak
