= Vicky Byarugaba =

Ugandan boxer

Personal information
- Nationality: Ugandan
- Born: 17 November 1954 (age 70)

Sport
- Sport: Boxing

Victor "Vicky" Byarugaba (born 17 November 1954) is a Ugandan boxer. He competed in the men's light middleweight event at the 1984 Summer Olympics.

== Career ==
Byarugaba beat an Israelie boxer in 1976 and this excited His Excellency Idi Amin which he called revenge against .
