= Stephen Okumu =

Kenyan boxer (1958–2019)

Personal information
- Nationality: Kenyan
- Born: 28 February 1958
- Died: 7 October 2019 (aged 61); Nairobi, Kenya

Sport
- Sport: Boxing

Stephen Okumu (28 February 1958 – 7 October 2019) was a Kenyan boxer. He competed in the men's light middleweight event at the 1984 Summer Olympics.
