= Gustavo Ollo =

Argentine boxer

Personal information
- Nationality: Argentine
- Born: 22 October 1963 (age 62)
- Height: 175 cm (5 ft 9 in)
- Weight: 71 kg (157 lb)

Sport
- Sport: Boxing

Gustavo Ollo (born 22 October 1963) is an Argentine boxer. He competed in the men's light middleweight event at the 1984 Summer Olympics.
