= Salulolo Aumua =

Samoan boxer (born 1964)

Personal information
- Nationality: Samoan
- Born: 12 December 1964 (age 60)

Sport
- Sport: Boxing

Salulolo Aumua (born 12 December 1964) is a Samoan boxer. He competed in the men's light middleweight event at the 1984 Summer Olympics.
