= Elone Lutui =

Tongan boxer

Personal information
- Nationality: Tongan
- Born: 2 January 1961 (age 64)

Sport
- Sport: Boxing

Elone Lutui (born 2 January 1961) is a Tongan boxer. He competed in the men's light middleweight event at the 1984 Summer Olympics.
