= Mylon Watkins =

American boxer

Mylon Watkins is a former boxer in the Junior middleweight division.

== Career ==
=== Amateur career ===
Known as "Kid USA", Watkins had an outstanding amateur career, and was the upset winner of the 1984 National Golden Gloves Welterweight Championship and the 1985 and 1986 National Golden Gloves Light middleweight Champion.

=== Professional career ===
Watkins turned pro in 1987 and won his first two pro bouts, but never fought as a professional again. Watkins was shot in the chest during an argument, but not fatally, and never returned to the ring due to his injuries.
