= Gnohere Sery =

Ivorian boxer (born 1960)

Personal information
- Nationality: Ivorian
- Born: 27 November 1960 (age 64)

Sport
- Sport: Boxing

Gnohere Sery (born 27 November 1960) is an Ivorian boxer. He competed in the men's light middleweight event at the 1984 Summer Olympics.
