= Víctor Córdoba (footballer) =

Colombian footballer (born 1987)

Personal information
- Full name: Víctor Andrés Córdoba Córdoba
- Date of birth: November 8, 1987 (age 39)
- Place of birth: Medellín, Colombia
- Height: 1.83 m (6 ft 0 in)
- Position: Midfielder

Team information
- Current team: Bolívar

Senior career*
Years	Team	Apps	(Gls)
2011	Once Caldas	3	(0)
2012–2014	Real Cartagena	44	(2)
2014-2015	Bolívar	15	(0)
2015–2016	FC Juárez		
2016	Real Cartagena		
2017	Deportivo Táchira		
2018	Alianza Petrolera		
2018	Leones		
2019–2020	Marinhense		
2020–	Leiria		
- * Club domestic league appearances and goals

Víctor Andrés Córdoba Córdoba (born November 8, 1987) is a Colombian footballer who since 2014 has played midfielder for Bolívar.

In his career Córdoba has played for three clubs in three leagues. The clubs he has played for are Once Caldas, Real Cartagena and his current club Bolívar.

== Club career statistics ==
Club performance			League		Cup		League Cup		Total	
Season	Club	League	Apps	Goals	Apps	Goals	Apps	Goals	Apps	Goals
League		League Cup			International Cup		Total			
2011	Once Caldas	Categoría Primera A	3	0	4	0	-	-	7	0
2012	Real Cartagena	Categoría Primera A	2	0	-	-	-	-	2	0
2013	Real Cartagena	Categoría Primera B	31	2	12	1	-	-	43	3
2014	Real Cartagena	Categoría Primera B	11	0	-	-	-	-	11	0
2014/15	Bolívar	Liga de Fútbol Profesional Boliviano	15	0	-	-	1	0	16	0
Total			62	2	16	1	1	0	79	3
