= Simen Auseth =

Norwegian boxer

Personal information
- Nationality: Norwegian
- Born: 8 April 1963 (age 61); Oslo

Sport
- Country: Norway
- Sport: Boxing

Simen Auseth (born 8 April 1963) is a Norwegian boxer. He was born in Oslo. He competed at the 1984 Summer Olympics in Los Angeles. He represented the club IF Ørnulf.
