= Steve Little (boxer) =

American boxer (1965–2000)

Personal information
- Nickname: Lightning
- Nationality: American
- Born: Steven K. Little; June 9, 1965 Philadelphia, Pennsylvania, U.S.
- Died: January 30, 2000 (aged 34) West Reading, Pennsylvania, U.S.
- Height: 5 ft 10 in (178 cm)
- Weight: Light middleweight; Middleweight; Super middleweight; Cruiserweight

Boxing career
- Reach: 72 in (183 cm)
- Stance: Orthodox

Boxing record
- Total fights: 45
- Wins: 25
- Win by KO: 6
- Losses: 17
- Draws: 3

Steve Little (June 9, 1965 – January 30, 2000) was an American professional boxer who competed from 1983 to 1998, having held the WBA super middleweight champion in 1994. He is best known for his victories over Pipino Cuevas and Michael Nunn.

== Amateur boxing career ==
Little won 228 of 265 amateur bouts and fought in eight amateur weight classes, ranging from 80 pounds (36 kg) to 156 pounds (71 kg).

== Professional boxing career ==
Little turned professional in 1983 and while he won his first four bouts, he soon started compiling losses including to former WBC light middleweight champion Terry Norris. Even with a mediocre record, he fought for the WBO light-middleweight title against John David Jackson in 1989. He lost by a technical knockout. He retired for a short time after that fight.

In 1994 he scored an upset victory over Lineal and WBA super-middleweight champion Michael Nunn by split decision in London. He lost the belt in his first defense to Frankie Liles, losing a decision. Although he later fought James Toney and Arthur Williams, he never fought for another major title.

Besides being a professional boxer, Little also sold used cars in Reading.

Little retired in 1998 and died from colon cancer in 2000, at the young age of 34. He left behind a wife and six children.

== Professional boxing record ==
45 fights	25 wins	17 losses
By knockout	6	3
By decision	19	14
Draws	3	

No.	Result	Record	Opponent	Type	Round, time	Date	Location	Notes
45	Draw	25–17–3	Courtney Butler	SD	8	Nov 3, 1998	Martin's West, Woodlawn, Maryland, U.S.	
44	Loss	25–17–2	Ivan Camacho	PTS	6	Oct 16, 1998	Aalborghallen, Aalborg, Denmark	
43	Loss	25–16–2	Arthur Williams	UD	12	Sep 9, 1997	Fernwood Resort, Bushkill, Pennsylvania, U.S.	For IBF–USBA cruiserweight title
42	Win	25–15–2	Andre Sherro	KO	3 (?)	Aug 24, 1997	Riveredge Restaurant, Reading, Pennsylvania, U.S.	
41	Loss	24–15–2	James Toney	UD	12	Jun 14, 1997	Grand Casino Biloxi, Biloxi, Mississippi, U.S.	For IBO cruiserweight title
40	Win	24–14–2	Joaquin Velasquez	UD	12	Aug 30, 1996	Municipal Stadium, Reading, Pennsylvania, U.S.	Won IBC super middleweight title
39	Win	23–14–2	Camilo Alarcon	UD	12	Mar 23, 1996	Miami Arena, Miami, Florida, U.S.	Won WBC FECARBOX super middleweight title
38	Loss	22–14–2	Frankie Liles	UD	12	Aug 12, 1994	Club Defensores de Villa Lujan, San Miguel de Tucuman, Argentina	Lost WBA super middleweight title
37	Win	22–13–2	Michael Nunn	SD	12	Feb 26, 1994	Earls Court Exhibition Centre, Kensington, London, U.S.	Won WBA super middleweight title
36	Win	21–13–2	Anthony Williams	UD	8	Dec 4, 1992	Merv's Griffin Resorts, Atlantic City, New Jersey, U.S.	
35	Win	20–13–2	Hector Rosario	UD	10	Sep 14, 1992	Outdoor Arena, Philadelphia, Pennsylvania, U.S.	
34	Draw	19–13–2	Merqui Sosa	SD	10	Jan 31, 1992	The Blue Horizon, Philadelphia, Pennsylvania, U.S.	
33	Win	19–13–1	Tyrone Frazier	SD	12	Sep 23, 1991	The Blue Horizon, Philadelphia, Pennsylvania,, U.S.	Won Pennsylvania State super middleweight title
32	Win	18–13–1	Michael Dale	UD	10	Jul 1, 1991	Cheyney University Gym, Cheyney, Pennsylvania, U.S.	
31	Loss	17–13–1	Adam Garland	MD	10	May 20, 1991	Birgwood Manor, Whippany, New Jersey, U.S.	
30	Win	17–12–1	Mike Brown	TKO	10 (?)	Jan 26, 1991	Reading High School, Reading, Pennsylvania, U.S.	
29	Loss	16–12–1	Tyrone Frazier	SD	10	Sep 17, 1990	The Blue Horizon, Philadelphia, Pennsylvania, U.S.	Won Pennsylvania super middleweight title
28	Loss	16–11–1	John David Jackson	TKO	8 (12), 0:38	Apr 22, 1989	The Palace of Auburn Hills, Auburn Hills, Michigan, U.S.	For WBO light middleweight title
27	Loss	16–10–1	Dave Hilton Jr.	UD	10	Mar 14, 1989	Resorts Casino Hotel, Atlantic City, New Jersey, U.S.	
26	Loss	16–9–1	Terry Norris	TKO	6 (12), 1:06	Dec 9, 1988	Caesars Palace, Las Vegas, Nevada, U.S.	For WBC–NABF light middleweight title
25	Win	16–8–1	Jerry Williams	UD	10	Aug 27, 1988	Reading Municipal Stadium, Reading, Pennsylvania, U.S.	
24	Loss	15–8–1	Robert Hines	UD	12	Apr 21, 1988	Resorts Casino Hotel, Atlantic City, New Jersey, U.S.	For IBF–USBA light middleweight title
23	Win	15–7–1	Ismael Negron	UD	10	Dec 23, 1987	Resorts Casino Hotel, Atlantic City, New Jersey, U.S.	
22	Loss	14–7–1	David Gutierrez	UD	10	Sep 3, 1987	Great Western Forum, Inglewood, California, U.S.	
21	Loss	14–6–1	Tyrone Trice	UD	10	Aug 6, 1987	Felt Forum, New York City, New York, U.S.	
20	Win	14–5–1	Norberto Bueno	UD	10	Feb 21, 1987	Trump Plaza Hotel and Casino, Atlantic City, New Jersey, U.S.	
19	Win	13–5–1	David Braxton	UD	10	Aug 12, 1986	Hart Plaza, Detroit, Michigan, U.S.	
18	Win	12–5–1	Pipino Cuevas	UD	10	Mar 3, 1986	ARCO Arena, Sacramento, California, U.S.	
17	Loss	11–5–1	Hugh Kearney	MD	12	Jan 14, 1986	The Blue Horizon, Philadelphia, Pennsylvania, U.S.	For Pennsylvania welterweight title
16	Loss	11–4–1	Glenn Wolfe	RTD	8 (10), 3:00	Sep 18, 1985	Egypt Shrine Temple, Tampa, Florida, U.S.	
15	Win	11–3–1	Sanford Ricks	SD	10	Jun 30, 1985	Essex Racquet Club, West Orange, New Jersey, U.S.	
14	Draw	10–3–1	Joe Walker	PTS	8	Jun 4, 1985	Tropicana Atlantic City, Atlantic City, New Jersey, U.S.	
13	Loss	10–3	Mark Breland	UD	6	Apr 6, 1985	Coliseum, San Angelo, Texas, U.S.	
12	Win	10–2	Junie Nash	UD	6	Feb 23, 1985	Sands Atlantic City, Atlantic City, New Jersey, U.S.	
11	Win	9–2	Glenn Wolfe	UD	8	Feb 5, 1985	Atlantis Hotel and Casino, Atlantic City, New Jersey, U.S.	
10	Win	8–2	Harold Whitfield	SD	6	Dec 12, 1984	Harrah's Marina, Atlantic City, New Jersey, U.S.	
9	Win	7–2	John Herbert	UD	6	Oct 31, 1984	Harrah's Atlantic, Atlantic City, New Jersey, U.S.	
8	Win	6–2	Bob Saxton	TKO	4 (6), 1:44	Oct 5, 1984	Sheraton Berkshire Inn, Reading, Pennsylvania, U.S.	
7	Loss	5–2	Joe Summers	MD	6	Sep 18, 1984	Tropicana Hotel and Casino, Atlantic City, New Jersey, U.S.	
6	Loss	5–1	Tony Montgomery	UD	6	May 30, 1984	Harrah's Marina, Atlantic City, New Jersey, U.S.	
5	Win	5–0	Charlie Smith	KO	4 (6)	Apr 25, 1984	Harrah's Marina, Atlantic City, New Jersey, U.S.	
4	Win	4–0	Buddy Randolph	TKO	2 (4)	Apr 7, 1984	Sands, Atlantic City, New Jersey, U.S.	
3	Win	3–0	James Morgan	UD	4	Feb 22, 1984	Harrah's Marina, Atlantic City, New Jersey, U.S.	
2	Win	2–0	Greg Tutt	SD	4	Feb 3, 1984	Holiday Inn West, Allentown, Pennsylvania, U.S.	
1	Win	1–0	Gregory Girolami	TKO	2 (4), 0:35	Dec 13, 1983	Tropicana, Atlantic City, New Jersey, U.S.	

== Championship titles held ==
- Pennsylvania State - Super Middleweight (1991)
- Lineal - Super Middleweight (1994)
- WBA - Super Middleweight (1994)
- WBC FECARBOX - Super Middleweight (1996)
- IBC - Super Middleweight (1996)

== See also ==
- Lineal championship
- List of world super-middleweight boxing champions

Sporting positions
World boxing titles
Preceded by Michael Nunn	WBA super middleweight champion February 26, 1994 – August 12, 1994	Succeeded by Frankie Liles
