= Mario Muñoz =

Colombian footballer (born 1984)

Personal information
- Full name: Mario Alberto Muñoz Rojas
- Date of birth: August 7, 1984 (age 42)
- Place of birth: Putumayo Department, Colombia
- Height: 1.86 m (6 ft 1 in)
- Position: Goalkeeper

Senior career*
Years	Team	Apps	(Gls)
2006–2007	Academia		
2008	Cúcuta Deportivo		
2009	Atlético Bucaramanga		
2010	Patriotas		
2011–2013	Bogotá	48	(0)
- * Club domestic league appearances and goals

Mario Alberto Muñoz Rojas (born August 7, 1984) is a Colombian football player who plays for Bogotá F.C.
