= Darnell Wilson (middleweight boxer) =

American boxer

Darnell Wilson (born June 23, 1966) is an American former boxer who was a 1996 Light Middleweight U.S. Olympic alternate.

== Amateur career ==
Born on the Southside of Chicago, Wilson started boxing in 1980 at the age of 14. He was coached by Tom O'Shea. Wilson was an amateur standout and was the 1993 National Golden Gloves Light Middleweight Champion. He later went on to become the United States Amateur Light middleweight champion in 1997–1999. He was a Chicago Golden Gloves finalist in 1986 and won the competition from 1990 to 1992. He was the U.S. Olympic alternate in 1996.

== Professional career ==
Wilson turned professional in 2002 and was undefeated in his first 8 fights, including a win over journeyman Reggie Strickland, he also had a draw with Ishmail Arvin before losing to Chad Dawson by decision in 2004 for the WBC World Youth middleweight title. Wilson fought three times after this, going 1–0–2. He retired in 2012 after a draw with undefeated fighter Paul Littleton.

== Enternal links ==
- Darnell Wilson at BoxRec (registration required)
