= Fletcher Kapito =

Malawian boxer (born 1959)

Personal information
- Nationality: Malawian
- Born: 19 October 1959 (age 66)
- Height: 1.73 m (5 ft 8 in)
- Weight: 69 kg (152 lb)

Sport
- Sport: Boxing
- Weight class: Light middleweight

Fletcher Kapito (born 19 October 1959) is a Malawian former boxer.

Fletcher competed in the light middleweight event at the 1984 Summer Olympics in Los Angeles, where he was defeated in the first round by his Sudanese opponent, Augustino Marial. Fletcher was the Malawian flag carrier in the opening ceremony at the Games.

By March 1986, Kapito had lost some weight and began boxing in the welterweight category.
