= Lotfi Ayed =

Swedish boxer (born 1959)

Personal information
- Nationality: Swedish
- Born: 25 February 1959 (age 66); Sousse, Tunisia

Sport
- Sport: Boxing
- Club: Hammarby IF

Lotfi Ayed (born 25 February 1959) is a Swedish boxer who competed at both the 1984 and 1988 Summer Olympics. At the 1984 games, he lost to Frank Tate of the United States.
