= Michael Nunn =

American boxer (born 1963)

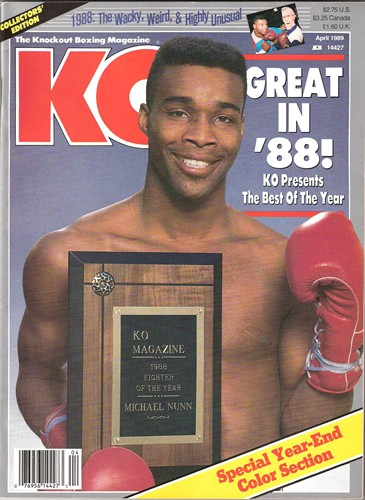
- Nunn on the cover of KO Magazine, declared as "Fighter Of The Year" for 1988

Personal information
- Nickname: Second To Nunn
- Born: Michael John Nunn; April 14, 1963 (age 63) Davenport, Iowa, U.S.
- Height: 6 ft 2 in (188 cm)
- Weight: Middleweight; Super middleweight; Light heavyweight

Boxing career
- Reach: 77 in (196 cm)
- Stance: Southpaw

Boxing record
- Total fights: 62
- Wins: 58
- Win by KO: 38
- Losses: 4

Michael John Nunn (born April 14, 1963) is an American former professional boxer who competed from 1984 to 2002. He is a world champion in two weight classes, having held the International Boxing Federation (IBF) middleweight title from 1988 to 1991, and the World Boxing Association (WBA) super middleweight title from 1992 to 1994. During both those reigns, he also held the lineal championship. In 2004, Nunn was sentenced to 24 years in prison for drug trafficking; he was released in February 2019. Nunn was inducted into the International Boxing Hall of Fame as part of the class of 2025.

== Amateur career ==
Nunn won three Iowa Golden Gloves titles and posted an amateur record of 168-8. At the 1984 Olympic trials, U.S. boxing officials asked Nunn, who was boxing as a 156-pounder, to move up to the 165-pound division. They wanted to clear the way for Frank Tate, the eventual Olympic gold medalist, who was being heralded as America's next great middleweight. Tate's last loss was to Nunn.

After agreeing to move up in weight, Nunn boxed Virgil Hill at the Olympic trials in Fort Worth, Texas. Hill defeated Nunn by a 4-1 decision. Nunn and Hill boxed again at the Olympic box-offs in Las Vegas, Nevada. Nunn won the first box-off by a 5-0 decision. In the second box-off, Hill dropped Nunn and won by a 5-0 decision to make the Olympic team as the U.S. representative in the 165-pound division.

== Professional career ==
=== Middleweight ===
Nunn turned professional in 1984. After winning his first thirty fights, he fought IBF middleweight title-holder Frank Tate, who was 23-0. The fight took place on July 28, 1988 at Caesars Palace in Las Vegas. Nunn won the title by a ninth-round knockout.

In his first title defense, he knocked out Juan Roldan in the eighth round. His second defense was a stunning first-round knockout of Sumbu Kalambay to capture the vacant lineal middleweight championship. Nunn's next two title defenses were twelve-round majority decision wins over Iran Barkley and Marlon Starling. For his fifth defense, Nunn went to France and knocked out Donald Curry in ten rounds. On May 10, 1991, in his hometown of Davenport, Iowa, Nunn lost his title in a big upset to James Toney. Nunn, well ahead on points after ten rounds, was knocked out after being dropped by a left hook in the eleventh round.

=== Super middleweight ===
After the loss, Nunn moved up a weight division to super middleweight and won the NABF title with a tenth-round stoppage against Randall Yonker. On September 12, 1992, Nunn won the WBA and lineal super middleweight titles with a controversial twelve-round split decision over Victor Cordoba. The WBA ordered a rematch, which took place on January 30, 1993. Nunn fought much better in the rematch, winning by a one-sided twelve-round unanimous decision.

In his fifth title defense, Nunn lost the title to Steve Little by a twelve-round split decision on February 26, 1994, in another huge upset. On December 17, 1994, Nunn traveled to Ecuador to fight Frankie Liles in an attempt to regain the lineal and WBA super middleweight titles. In a very close fight, Liles, who had defeated Little in his previous fight to win the title, defeated Nunn by a twelve-round unanimous decision.

=== Light heavyweight ===
After nine consecutive wins, Nunn got another title shot. On March 21, 1998, he fought Graciano Rocchigiani for the vacant WBC light heavyweight title in Germany. Nunn lost by a twelve-round split decision, with the judges favouring Rocchigiani's fewer, more solid punches over Nunn's much higher volume of lighter shots.

On January 23, 2002, Nunn defeated Vinson Durhan by a ten-round unanimous decision at Caesars Indiana in Bridgeport, Indiana. It would be his last fight. He finished with a record of 58-4 with 37 knockouts.

== Arrest and sentencing ==
On August 6, 2002, at a hotel in his hometown of Davenport, Iowa, Nunn was arrested after paying an undercover agent $200 for one kilogram of cocaine, which had a street value of $24,000. In May 2003, he pleaded guilty to one count of conspiracy to distribute cocaine. The following January, Nunn was sentenced to 292 months in federal prison by U.S. District Judge William Gritzer, who agreed to a higher sentencing guideline after considering Nunn's long history of drug trafficking and the likelihood that he used a firearm during drug deals.

During the three-day sentencing hearing, prosecutors called witnesses who testified about Nunn's drug activity dating back to 1993. Nunn, who accepted responsibility for buying drugs in August 2002, denied his involvement in drug trafficking. He pointed out that several of the witnesses were in prison and could have their sentences reduced for providing testimony.

Nunn, who was defiant throughout the hearing, accused government lawyers of lying and scheming against him. "You guys haven't shown me nothing," Nunn said in his statement to the judge. "Where are your facts, Mr. Prosecutor?"

Nunn was released from federal prison on August 8, 2019.

== Professional boxing record ==
62 fights	58 wins	4 losses
By knockout	38	1
By decision	20	3

No.	Result	Record	Opponent	Type	Round, time	Date	Location	Notes
62	Win	58–4	Vinson Durham	UD	10	Jan 23, 2002	Caesars Indiana, Elizabeth, Indiana, U.S.	
61	Win	57–4	Matthew Charleston	TKO	5	Dec 8, 2001	Grand Casino, Biloxi, Mississippi, U.S.	
60	Win	56–4	Kenny Craven	TKO	6 (10), 1:57	Oct 26, 2001	Grand Casino, Gulfport, Mississippi, U.S.	
59	Win	55–4	Carlos Bates	KO	1 (10), 2:33	Sep 29, 2001	Caesars, Elizabeth, Indiana, U.S.	
58	Win	54–4	William Guthrie	TKO	7 (10), 0:22	May 9, 1999	Municipal Auditorium, Minot, North Dakota, U.S.	
57	Win	53–4	Glenn Thomas	UD	10	Sep 4, 1998	Miccosukee Resort & Gaming, Miami, Florida, U.S.	
56	Loss	52–4	Graciano Rocchigiani	SD	12	Mar 21, 1998	Max-Schmeling-Halle, Berlin, Germany	For vacant WBC light heavyweight title
55	Win	52–3	Lonnie Horn	KO	1 (10), 2:59	Jul 5, 1997	The MARK of the Quad Cities, Moline, Illinois, U.S.	
54	Win	51–3	Booker T Word	TKO	7 (10), 1:49	May 10, 1997	The MARK of the Quad Cities, Moline, Illinois, U.S.	
53	Win	50–3	Rudy Nix	TKO	2 (12), 2:52	Jan 17, 1997	Country Club, Reseda, California, U.S.	Won vacant NABF light heavyweight title
52	Win	49–3	Everardo Armenta Jr.	TKO	8 (10), 2:27	Jun 23, 1996	Houston, Texas, U.S.	
51	Win	48–3	John Scully	UD	12	Dec 8, 1995	Foxwoods Resort Casino, Ledyard, Connecticut, U.S.	Won vacant WBO–NABO super middleweight title
50	Win	47–3	Charles Oliver	UD	10	Oct 13, 1995	Fantasy Springs Resort Casino, Indio, California, U.S.	
49	Win	46–3	Cecil McKenzie	TKO	4 (10), 2:07	Aug 15, 1995	Arizona Charlie's Decatur, Las Vegas, Nevada, U.S.	
48	Win	45–3	Terry Bee	TKO	3 (10), 1:41	Jul 14, 1995	Arizona Charlie's Decatur, Las Vegas, Nevada, U.S.	
47	Win	44–3	Earl Butler	UD	10	Jun 13, 1995	The MARK of the Quad Cities, Moline, Illinois, U.S.	
46	Loss	43–3	Frankie Liles	UD	12	Dec 17, 1994	Coliseo General Rumiñahui, Quito, Ecuador	For WBA super middleweight title
45	Win	43–2	Salvador Maciel	KO	1 (10), 0:56	Sep 12, 1994	Silver Nugget, North Las Vegas, Nevada, U.S.	
44	Loss	42–2	Steve Little	SD	12	Feb 26, 1994	Earls Court Exhibition Centre, London, England	Lost WBA super middleweight title
43	Win	42–1	Merqui Sosa	UD	12	Dec 18, 1993	Estadio Cuauhtémoc, Puebla City, Mexico	Retained WBA super middleweight title
42	Win	41–1	Crawford Ashley	TKO	6 (12), 2:59	Apr 23, 1993	The Pyramid, Memphis, Tennessee, U.S.	Retained WBA super middleweight title
41	Win	40–1	Danny Morgan	KO	1 (12), 2:59	Feb 20, 1993	Estadio Azteca, Mexico City, Mexico	Retained WBA super middleweight title
40	Win	39–1	Víctor Córdoba	UD	12	Jan 30, 1993	The Pyramid, Memphis, Tennessee, U.S.	Retained WBA super middleweight title
39	Win	38–1	Víctor Córdoba	SD	12	Sep 12, 1992	Thomas & Mack Center, Paradise, Nevada, U.S.	Won WBA super middleweight title
38	Win	37–1	Randall Yonker	TKO	10 (12), 1:47	Nov 29, 1991	The Mirage, Paradise, Nevada, U.S.	Won NABF super middleweight title
37	Loss	36–1	James Toney	TKO	11 (12), 2:14	May 10, 1991	John O'Donnell Stadium, Davenport, Iowa, U.S.	Lost IBF middleweight title
36	Win	36–0	Donald Curry	KO	10 (12), 1:59	Oct 18, 1990	Palais Omnisports, Paris, France	Retained IBF middleweight title
35	Win	35–0	Marlon Starling	MD	12	Apr 14, 1990	The Mirage, Paradise, Nevada, U.S.	Retained IBF middleweight title
34	Win	34–0	Iran Barkley	MD	12	Aug 14, 1989	Lawlor Events Center, Reno, Nevada, U.S.	Retained IBF and The Ring middleweight title
33	Win	33–0	Sumbu Kalambay	KO	1 (12), 1:28	Mar 25, 1989	Las Vegas Hilton, Winchester, Nevada, U.S.	Retained IBF middleweight title Won The Ring middleweight title
32	Win	32–0	Juan Roldán	KO	8 (12), 2:28	Nov 4, 1988	Las Vegas Hilton, Paradise, Nevada, U.S.	Retained IBF middleweight title
31	Win	31–0	Frank Tate	TKO	9 (15), 0:40	Jul 28, 1988	Caesars Palace, Paradise, Nevada, U.S.	Won IBF middleweight title
30	Win	30–0	Ron Daniels	KO	2 (10), 2:51	May 31, 1988	Country Club, Reseda, California, U.S.	
29	Win	29–0	Curtis Parker	KO	2 (12), 0:58	Mar 19, 1988	Caesars Palace, Paradise, Nevada, U.S.	Retained NABF middleweight title
28	Win	28–0	Kevin Watts	UD	12	Jan 2, 1988	Country Club, Reseda, California, U.S.	Retained NABF middleweight title
27	Win	27–0	Darnell Knox	RTD	4 (12), 3:00	Oct 29, 1987	Las Vegas Hilton, Winchester, Nevada, U.S.	Won vacant NABF middleweight title
26	Win	26–0	Dale Jackson	UD	10	Sep 11, 1987	Palmer Auditorium, Davenport, Iowa, U.S.	
25	Win	25–0	Franklin Owens	TKO	9 (10), 0:51	Aug 11, 1987	Bally's Las Vegas, Paradise, Nevada, U.S.	
24	Win	24–0	Jose Duarte	TKO	2 (10), 1:45	Jul 2, 1987	Country Club, Reseda, California, U.S.	
23	Win	23–0	Cecil Pettigrew	TKO	5 (10), 0:45	Apr 24, 1987	Palmer Auditorium, Davenport, Iowa, U.S.	
22	Win	22–0	Charles Campbell	TKO	9 (10), 1:04	Apr 4, 1987	Caesars Palace, Paradise, Nevada, U.S.	
21	Win	21–0	Willie Harris	TKO	6 (10)	Feb 6, 1987	Country Club, Reseda, California, U.S.	
20	Win	20–0	Alex Ramos	UD	12	Nov 21, 1986	Country Club, Reseda, California, U.S.	Won vacant California State middleweight title
19	Win	19–0	Orlando Paulding	KO	1 (10), 2:09	Oct 28, 1986	Country Club, Reseda, California, U.S.	
18	Win	18–0	Mike Tinley	UD	10	Sep 19, 1986	Steel Pier, Atlantic City, New Jersey, U.S.	
17	Win	17–0	Charles Boston	UD	10	Jul 25, 1986	Las Vegas, Nevada, U.S.	
16	Win	16–0	Randy Smith	UD	10	Jun 25, 1986	The Forum, Inglewood, California, U.S.	
15	Win	15–0	Felipe Vaca	TKO	3 (10), 1:56	May 19, 1986	Country Club, Reseda, California, U.S.	
14	Win	14–0	Carl Jones	UD	10	Mar 9, 1986	Caesars Palace, Paradise, Nevada, U.S.	
13	Win	13–0	Charles Carter	TKO	3 (10)	Feb 10, 1986	The Forum, Inglewood, California, U.S.	
12	Win	12–0	Alvaro Granillo	TKO	2 (10), 1:35	Jan 28, 1986	Country Club, Reseda, California, U.S.	
11	Win	11–0	Billy Robertson	UD	10	Dec 10, 1985	The Forum, Inglewood, California, U.S.	
10	Win	10–0	Jorge Amparo	UD	8	Nov 13, 1985	Showboat Hotel and Casino, Las Vegas, Nevada, U.S.	
9	Win	9–0	Charles Campbell	UD	8	Sep 25, 1985	Showboat Hotel and Casino, Las Vegas, Nevada, U.S.	
8	Win	8–0	Marcos Geraldo	TKO	5 (8), 1:18	Aug 27, 1985	Country Club, Reseda, California, U.S.	
7	Win	7–0	James Waire	TKO	3 (8), 2:31	Jul 29, 1985	Country Club, Reseda, California, U.S.	
6	Win	6–0	Larry Davis	TKO	2 (6), 1:15	Jun 27, 1985	Showboat Hotel and Casino, Las Vegas, Nevada, U.S.	
5	Win	5–0	J W Johnson	KO	1 (8), 2:57	May 21, 1985	Country Club, Reseda, California, U.S.	
4	Win	4–0	Sergio Campos	KO	1 (6), 1:57	Apr 13, 1985	Showboat Hotel and Casino, Las Vegas, Nevada, U.S.	
3	Win	3–0	Robert Jackson	KO	1 (8), 1:22	Mar 26, 1985	Country Club, Reseda, California, U.S.	
2	Win	2–0	Ismael Templos	KO	4 (6)	Feb 8, 1985	Caesars Tahoe, Stateline, Nevada, U.S.	
1	Win	1–0	John Borman	TKO	1 (4), 2:26	Dec 20, 1984	Showboat Hotel and Casino, Las Vegas, Nevada, U.S.	

== Titles in boxing ==
=== Major world titles ===
- IBF middleweight champion (160 lbs)
- WBA super middleweight champion (168 lbs)

=== The Ring magazine titles ===
- The Ring middleweight champion (160 lbs)

=== Regional/International titles ===
- NABF middleweight champion (160 lbs)
- NABF super middleweight champion (168 lbs)
- WBO–NABO super middleweight champion (168 lbs)
- NABF light heavyweight champion (175 lbs)

== Personal ==
Nunn's brother in law is Roger Craig, a professional American football player who married Nunn's sister.

== See also ==
- List of middleweight boxing champions
- List of super middleweight boxing champions
- List of WBA world champions
- List of IBF world champions

Sporting positions
Regional boxing titles
Vacant Title last held by Fred Hutchings	California middleweight champion November 21, 1986 – September 1987; Vacated	Vacant Title next held by Tim Williams
Vacant Title last held by Thomas Hearns	NABF middleweight champion October 29, 1987 – July 28, 1988; Won IBF title	Vacant Title next held by Ron Essett
Preceded by Randall Yonker	NABF super middleweight champion November 29, 1991 – September 1992; Vacated	Vacant Title next held by Frankie Liles
New title	WBO–NABO super middleweight champion December 8, 1995 – January 1997; Vacated	Vacant Title next held by Tarick Salmaci
Vacant Title last held by Montell Griffin	NABF light heavyweight champion January 17, 1997 – May 1997; Vacated	Vacant Title next held by Merqui Sosa
World boxing titles
Preceded by Frank Tate	IBF middleweight champion July 28, 1988 – May 10, 1991	Succeeded by James Toney
Preceded by Sumbu Kalambay	The Ring middleweight champion March 25, 1989 – December 31, 1989; Title terminated	Vacant Title next held by Bernard Hopkins; Title reintroduced
Preceded by Víctor Córdoba	WBA super middleweight champion September 12, 1992 – February 26, 1994	Succeeded by Steve Little
Awards
Previous: Kelvin Seabrooks	The Ring Progress of the Year; 1988	Award discontinued
New title	The Ring Knockout of the year KO1 Sumbu Kalambay; 1989	Next: Terry Norris; KO1 John Mugabi
