= Víctor Córdoba (boxer) =

Panamanian boxer

Victor Cordoba
Personal information
- Nickname: Toby
- Born: Victor Cordoba; March 15, 1962 (age 64) Darién, Panama
- Height: 6 ft 1 in (185 cm)
- Weight: Middleweight; Super middleweight; Light heavyweight

Boxing career
- Reach: 77 in (196 cm)
- Stance: Southpaw

Boxing record
- Total fights: 31
- Wins: 22
- Win by KO: 16
- Losses: 6
- Draws: 3
- No contests: 0

Víctor Córdoba (born March 15, 1962) is a Panamanian former professional boxer who competed from 1981 to 1999. He held the World Boxing Association (WBA) super middleweight title from 1991 to 1992.

== Professional career ==
He turned pro in 1981 and captured the Lineal and WBA super middleweight titles from Christophe Tiozzo in 1991. He defended the title once against Vincenzo Nardiello before losing the belt the same year to Michael Nunn by split decision. In the rematch the following year, Córdoba lost again.

One of his trainers was María Toto.

== Professional boxing record ==
31 fights	22 wins	6 losses
By knockout	16	2
By decision	6	3
By disqualification	0	1
Draws	3	

Result	Record	Opponent	Type	Round, time	Date	Location	Notes
Win	22–6–3	(Panama) Eduardo Rodriguez	TKO	4 (10)	1999-07-30	Balboa Civic Center, Panama City	
Loss	21–6–3	(Mexico) Leonardo Aguilar	TKO	4 (12)	1996-06-17	(United States) The Forum, Inglewood	For NABO light heavyweight title
Win	21–5–3	(United States) Tim Hillie	PTS	8 (8)	1994-12-17	(Ecuador) Ruminahui Coliseum, Quito	
Loss	20–5–3	(Democratic Republic of the Congo) Lumbala Tshibamba	PTS	8 (8)	1993-11-30	(France) Palais des Sports, Marseille	
Win	20–4–3	(United Kingdom) Tony Booth	PTS	8 (8)	1993-06-03	(France) Palais des Sports, Marseille	
Loss	19–4–3	(United States) Michael Nunn	UD	12 (12)	1993-01-30	(United States) The Pyramid, Memphis	For WBA super middleweight title
Loss	19–3–3	(United States) Michael Nunn	SD	12 (12)	12 Sep 1992	(United States) Thomas & Mack Center, Las Vegas	Lost WBA super middleweight title
Win	19–2–3	(Italy) Vincenzo Nardiello	TKO	11 (12)	1991-12-13	(France) Palais Omnisport de Paris-Bercy, Paris	Retained WBA super middleweight title
Win	18–2–3	(France) Christophe Tiozzo	TKO	9 (12)	1991-04-05	(France) Palais des Sports, Marseille	Won WBA super middleweight title
Win	17–2–3	(United States) Elvis Parks	TKO	1 (10)	1990-11-23	(France) Hall de Cergy, Cergy-Pontoise	
Win	16–2–3	(France) Jean-Noel Camara	TKO	2 (10)	1990-07-20	(France) Arènes d'Arles, Arles	
Win	15–2–3	(United States) Frank Rhodes	PTS	8 (8)	1990-05-23	(United Kingdom) Kings Hall, Belfast	
Win	14–2–3	(Brazil) Jose Carlos da Silva	PTS	8 (8)	1989-11-29	(United Kingdom) Ulster Hall, Belfast	
Win	13–2–3	(United Kingdom) Blaine Logsdon	KO	2 (8)	1989-10-31	(United Kingdom) Ulster Hall, Belfast	
Loss	12–2–3	(Jamaica) Abner Blackstock	DQ	2 (8)	1989-09-19	(United Kingdom) Ulster Hall, Belfast	
Win	12–1–3	(United States) Randy Smith	PTS	8 (8)	1989-04-12	(United Kingdom) Ulster Hall, Belfast	
Win	11–1–3	(Jamaica) Anthony Logan	TKO	1 (8)	1989-03-08	(United Kingdom) Ulster Hall, Belfast	
Win	10–1–3	(Colombia) Tomas Polo Ruiz	TKO	3 (8)	1987-12-19	(Colombia) San Andres	
Win	9–1–3	(Colombia) Horacio Perez	KO	2 (10)	1987-10-23	(Colombia) Coliseo Isla, San Andres	
Win	8–1–3	(Colombia) Sigfrido Colorado	TKO	2 (10)	1987-09-26	Gimnasio Neco de la Guardia, Panama City	
Win	7–1–3	(Colombia) Jairo Tovar	KO	7 (10)	1987-08-30	(Colombia) San Andres	
Win	6–1–3	(Ecuador) Dunio Mercado	KO	7 (10)	1987-04-10	Colombia	
Win	5–1–3	(Panama) Nestor Flores	KO	3 (12)	1985-08-30	Gimnasio Neco de la Guardia, Panama City	Won WBA Fedelatin middleweight title
Win	4–1–3	(Democratic Republic of the Congo) Andre Mongelema	PTS	8 (8)	1985-07-14	(Monaco) Stade Louis II, Fontvieille	
Win	3–1–3	(Panama) Ramon Matamba	KO	3 (10)	1985-03-30	Gimnasio Neco de la Guardia, Panama City	
Win	2–1–3	(Panama) Jorge Montenegro	KO	2 (8)	1984-12-28	Gimnasio Neco de la Guardia, Panama City	
Win	1–1–3	(Panama) Felix Rivas	TKO	3 (8)	1984-11-18	Gimnasio Neco de la Guardia, Panama City	
Draw	0–1–3	(Panama) Felix Rivas	PTS	4 (4)	1982-10-16	Gimnasio Neco de la Guardia, Panama City	
Loss	0–1–2	(Panama) Nestor Flores	KO	3 (4)	1982-07-03	Gimnasio Nuevo Panama, Panama City	
Draw	0–0–2	(Panama) Felix Rivas	PTS	4 (4)	1982-03-05	Gimnasio Neco de la Guardia, Panama City	
Draw	0–0–1	(Panama) Felix Rivas	PTS	4 (4)	1981-05-30	Arena Panama Al Brown, Colon City	

== See also ==
- List of super-middleweight boxing champions

Sporting positions
World boxing titles
Preceded by Christophe Tiozzo	WBA super middleweight champion April 5, 1991 – September 12, 1992	Succeeded by Michael Nunn
