= Romolo Casamonica =

Italian boxer (born 1962)

Personal information
- Nationality: Italian
- Born: 23 December 1962 (age 63) Rome, Italy

Sport
- Sport: Boxing
Medal record
Men's amateur boxing
Representing Italy
World Cup
Silver medal – second place	1983 Rome	Light middleweight

Romolo Casamonica (born 23 December 1962) is an Italian former professional boxer who competed from 1985 to 1996. As an amateur, he competed in the men's light middleweight event at the 1984 Summer Olympics.
