= An Dal-ho =

South Korean boxer

Personal information
- Nationality: South Korean
- Born: 6 March 1963 (age 63)

Sport
- Sport: Boxing
Medal record
Men's amateur boxing
Representing South Korea
World Cup
Bronze medal – third place	1985 Seoul	Light middleweight

An Dal-ho (born 6 March 1963) is a South Korean boxer. He competed in the men's light middleweight event at the 1984 Summer Olympics.
