= Israel Cole =

Sierra Leonean boxer (born 1964)

Personal information
- Nationality: Sierra Leonean
- Born: 28 October 1964 (age 60)

Sport
- Sport: Boxing

Israel Cole (born 28 October 1964) is a Sierra Leonean boxer. He competed in the men's light middleweight event at the 1984 Summer Olympics.

He settled in Los Angeles, California. In professional boxing, Cole made his debut in May 1985. In September 1989, he lost to Reggie Johnson in a fight for the WBA Inter-Continental Middle Weight title. After his loss to Ernesto Magdaleno in November 1992, Cole did not fight until September 1998. His last fight came in September 1999. Cole had an overall record of 15 wins, nine losses and 4 draws.
