= Robert Daniels (boxer) =

American boxer (born 1968)

Personal information
- Nickname: Preacherman
- Nationality: American
- Born: August 30, 1968 (age 58) Hialeah, Florida, USA
- Height: 5 ft 11 in (180 cm)
- Weight: Cruiserweight; Super cruiserweight; Heavyweight

Boxing career
- Reach: 71 1/2 in (182 cm)
- Stance: Orthodox

Boxing record
- Total fights: 61
- Wins: 49
- Win by KO: 41
- Losses: 10
- Draws: 1
- No contests: 1

Robert Daniels (born August 30, 1968) is an American former professional boxer who competed from 1984 to 2007, with a comeback in 2012. He held the WBA cruiserweight title from 1989 to 1991.

== Professional career ==
Daniels turned pro in 1984 and in 1989 he captured the vacant WBA cruiserweight title by defeating a badly faded 36-year-old Dwight Muhammad Qawi in France. He defended the title twice before losing the title to Bobby Czyz in 1991 in a close split decision in Atlantic City. He continued to fight as both a cruiserweight and heavyweight through 1997. In his highest profile fights as a heavyweight, he lost to Lawrence Clay-Bey and David Tua.

Robert Daniels was managed by Michael Frost, the boxing manager and former marketing agent for Gary Sheffield, Jeff Conine, Robb Nenn, Bret Barberie, and others.

== Bare-knuckle boxing record ==
Professional record breakdown
1 match	0 wins	1 loss
By knockout	0	1
By decision	0	0

== Professional boxing record ==
61 fights	49 wins	10 losses
By knockout	41	3
By decision	8	7
Draws	1	
No contests	1	

Result	Record	Opponent	Type	Round, time	Date	Location	Notes
Loss	49-10-1 (1)	(Puerto Rico) Victor Bisbal	TKO	3 (8)	02/03/2012	(Puerto Rico) Coliseo Angel Espada, Salinas	
Loss	49-9-1 (1)	(Sweden) Aldo Colliander	UD	6 (6)	15/09/2007	(Sweden) Lofberg Arena, Karlstad	
Loss	49-8-1 (1)	(Sweden) Aldo Colliander	MD	4 (4)	27/01/2007	(Sweden) Scandinavium Arena, Gothenburg	
Win	49-7-1 (1)	(United States) Dan Ward	KO	4 (10)	06/12/2005	(United States) Omni New Daisy Theater, Memphis	
Win	48-7-1 (1)	(United States) Shawn Robinson	KO	2 (8)	26/11/2005	(United States) Convention Center, Fort Smith	
Win	47-7-1 (1)	(United States) Shelby Gross	KO	3 (10)	04/10/2005	(United States) Omni New Daisy Theater, Memphis	
Win	46-7-1 (1)	(United States) Jason Waller	TKO	2 (8)	28/06/2005	(United States) Radisson Mart Plaza Hotel, Miami	
Loss	45-7-1 (1)	(Canada) Dale Brown	SD	12 (12)	08/06/2004	(United States) Seminole Hard Rock Hotel, Hollywood	For vacant WBC-NABF and WBO-NABO cruiserweight titles
Loss	45-6-1 (1)	(United States) Jermell Barnes	UD	12 (12)	05/12/2003	(United States) Seminole Casino, Coconut Creek	For vacant WBO-NABO cruiserweight title
Win	45-5-1 (1)	(Puerto Rico) Alex Gonzales	TKO	4 (12)	17/05/2003	(United States) Thunderbird Wild West Casino, Norman	Won vacant IBA super cruiserweight title
Win	44-5-1 (1)	(United States) John Randall	TKO	4 (8)	04/03/2003	(United States) Omni New Daisy Theater, Memphis	
Win	43-5-1 (1)	(United States) Samson Cohen	TKO	5 (12)	12/05/2001	(United States) Johnson City	Won vacant WBF super cruiserweight title
Win	42-5-1 (1)	(United States) Marvin Hunt	KO	1 (6)	12/04/2001	(United States) Gaillard Municipal Auditorium, Charleston	
Win	41-5-1 (1)	(United States) Frankie Hines	KO	6 (6)	23/03/2001	(United States) Virginia Beach	
Win	40-5-1 (1)	(United States) Danny Wofford	PTS	6 (6)	24/02/2001	(United States) Golden Gloves Arena, Knoxville	
Loss	39-5-1 (1)	(New Zealand) David Tua	KO	3 (12)	21/07/2000	(United States) Regent Hotel & Casino, Las Vegas	For IBF Inter-Continental and USBA heavyweight titles
Loss	39-4-1 (1)	(United States) Lawrence Clay-Bey	UD	10 (10)	23/01/2000	(United States) Venice Arena, Venice	
Win	39-3-1 (1)	(United States) Derek Amos	TKO	8 (8)	04/07/1999	(United States) Atlantis, Fort Lauderdale	
Win	38-3-1 (1)	(Netherlands) Don Diego Poeder	KO	10 (12)	05/05/1998	(United States) Grand Casino, Biloxi	Won vacant IBO cruiserweight title
Win	37-3-1 (1)	(United States) Danny Wofford	TKO	5 (8)	20/01/1998	(United States) Music City Mix Factory, Nashville	
Win	36-3-1 (1)	(United States) Lamont Burgin	KO	2 (8)	04/12/1997	(United States) Pepsi Arena, Albany	
Win	35-3-1 (1)	(United States) Kenny Keene	SD	12 (12)	01/03/1997	(United States) Convention Center, Atlantic City	Won vacant IBA cruiserweight title
Win	34-3-1 (1)	(United States) Duane Smith	TKO	2 (8)	05/12/1996	(United States) Brady Theater, Tulsa	
Win	33-3-1 (1)	(United States) Terry Ray	SD	10 (10)	01/10/1996	(United States) War Memorial Auditorium, Fort Lauderdale	
NC	32-3-1 (1)	(United States) Caseny Truesdale	NC	3 (10)	21/08/1996	(United States) The Ritz, Raleigh	
Win	32-3-1	(United States) Stan Johnson	TKO	1 (8)	14/07/1996	(United States) Lady Luck Casino, Davenport	
Win	31-3-1	(United States) Mike Sedillo	SD	10 (10)	20/02/1996	(United States) Mahi Temple Shrine Auditorium, Miami	
Win	30-3-1	(United States) Tim Knight	TKO	6 (10)	21/12/1995	(United States) War Memorial Auditorium, Fort Lauderdale	
Win	29-3-1	(United States) Tim St Clair	TKO	5 (8)	07/11/1995	(United States) Mountaineer Casino Racetrack, Chester	
Win	28-3-1	(United States) Mike Acey	KO	3 (10)	06/08/1995	(United States) Foxwoods Resort, Mashantucket	
Win	27-3-1	(United States) Artis Pendergrass	UD	8 (8)	27/06/1995	(United States) War Memorial Auditorium, Fort Lauderdale	
Win	26-3-1	(United States) Eddie Curry	KO	2 (8)	15/10/1994	(United States) Miami Beach	
Loss	25-3-1	(Russia) Sergey Kobozev	RTD	8 (12)	30/06/1994	(United States) Trump Castle, Atlantic City	For vacant USBA cruiserweight title
Win	25-2-1	(United States) James Flowers	TKO	6 (10)	10/03/1994	(United States) Park Plaza Hotel, Hialeah	
Win	24-2-1	(United States) James Flowers	TKO	9 (10)	25/06/1993	(United States) Orange Dome, Winter Haven	
Win	23-2-1	(United States) Lopez McGee	TKO	5 (10)	03/04/1993	(United States) Dalton	
Win	22-2-1	(United States) James Heath	PTS	10 (10)	13/02/1993	(United States) Miami	
Win	21-2-1	(United States) Barry Kirton	TKO	4 (10)	03/10/1992	(Puerto Rico) Camuy	
Win	20-2-1	(United States) Eddie Curry	TKO	2 (10)	14/08/1992	(United States) Greenville Memorial Auditorium, Greenville	
Loss	19-2-1	(United States) Bobby Czyz	SD	12 (12)	08/03/1991	(United States) Trump Taj Mahal, Atlantic City	Lost WBA cruiserweight title
Draw	19-1-1	(France) Taoufik Belbouli	PTS	12 (12)	22/11/1990	(Spain) Palacio de los Deportes, Madrid	Retained WBA cruiserweight title
Win	19-1	(United States) Craig Bodzianowski	UD	12 (12)	19/07/1990	(United States) Kingdome, Seattle	Retained WBA cruiserweight title
Win	18-1	(United States) Dwight Muhammad Qawi	SD	12 (12)	27/11/1989	(France) Pavillon Baltard, Nogent-sur-Marne	Won vacant WBA cruiserweight title
Win	17-1	(United States) Bobby Thomas	TKO	5 (10)	30/01/1989	(United States) The Heat Nightclub, Fort Lauderdale	
Win	16-1	(United States) Bruce Johnson	TKO	2 (8)	16/12/1988	(United States) James Knight Convention Center, Miami	
Win	15-1	(United States) Rodney Stockton	KO	6 (8)	29/10/1988	(United States) Las Vegas Hilton, Las Vegas	
Win	14-1	(United States) Gerald Brown	KO	2 (8)	30/07/1988	(United States) Convention Center, Miami Beach	
Win	13-1	(United States) Michael Johnson	TKO	4 (12)	22/04/1988	(United States) Milander Auditorium, Hialeah	Won USA Florida cruiserweight title
Win	12-1	(United States) Larry Gadsden	TKO	1 (6)	15/01/1988	(United States) Sheraton of the Americas, Hialeah	
Win	11-1	(United States) John L. Johnson	KO	1 (6)	15/06/1987	(United States) Miami Beach	
Win	10-1	(United States) Ernest Simmons	TKO	6 (6)	16/05/1987	(United States) Convention Center, Miami Beach	
Win	9-1	(United States) Norris Ford	TKO	1 (6)	28/02/1987	(United States) Convention Center, Coconut Grove	
Win	8-1	(United States) Milton Owens	KO	4 (6)	25/10/1985	(United States) Victory Park Auditorium, North Miami Beach	
Win	7-1	(United States) Mike De Angelo	TKO	2 (6)	27/09/1985	(United States) Sheraton Americas Hotel, Hialeah	
Win	6-1	(United States) Edward Sharkey	TKO	1 (6)	23/08/1985	(United States) Tamiami Fairgrounds Auditorium, Miami	
Win	5-1	(United States) Larry Sanchez	KO	2 (6)	24/10/1984	(United States) War Memorial Auditorium, Fort Lauderdale	
Win	4-1	(United States) Randy Armstrong	TKO	2 (4)	31/07/1984	(United States) Jai Alai Fronton, Miami	
Win	3-1	(United States) Brooks Groton	TKO	2 (4)	22/06/1984	(United States) National Guard Armory, West Palm Beach	
Loss	2-1	(United States) Eric Holley	PTS	4 (4)	13/06/1984	(United States) Sunrise Musical Theatre, Sunrise	
Win	2-0	(United States) Jose Marino	TKO	1 (4)	04/05/1984	(United States) National Guard Armory, Homestead	
Win	1-0	(United States) James Roper	KO	1 (4)	04/03/1984	(United States) Calle Ocho Festival, Miami	

== See also ==
- List of cruiserweight boxing champions

Sporting positions
Major world boxing titles
Vacant Title last held by Taoufik Belbouli	WBA cruiserweight champion November 27, 1989 - March 8, 1991	Succeeded by Bobby Czyz
Minor world boxing titles
Vacant Title last held by James Toney	IBO cruiserweight champion May 5, 1998 - 1999; Vacated	Vacant Title next held by Thomas Hearns
