= John Ruiz vs. James Toney =

Boxing competition

The Turning Point
- Date: April 30, 2005
- Venue: Madison Square Garden in New York City, New York
- Title(s) on the line: WBA and IBA heavyweight titles

Tale of the tape
Boxer	John Ruiz	James Toney
Nickname	"The Quietman"	"Lights Out"
Hometown	Chelsea, Massachusetts, U.S.	Grand Rapids, Michigan, U.S.
Pre-fight record	41–5–1 (28 KO)	68–4–2 (43 KO)
Age	33 years, 3 months	36 years, 8 months
Height	6 ft 2 in (188 cm)	5 ft 9 in (175 cm)
Weight	241 lb (109 kg)	233 lb (106 kg)
Style	Orthodox	Orthodox
Recognition	WBA; Heavyweight Champion; The Ring; No. 2 Ranked Heavyweight	WBA/WBC; No. 1 Ranked Heavyweight; The Ring; No. 4 Ranked Heavyweight; IBA; Heavyweight Champion; Former 3-division world champion

Result
- Originally a 12-round unanimous decision (116–111, 116-111, 115–112) for Toney; overturned to a no contest after he failed a drug test

John Ruiz vs. James Toney, billed as The Turning Point, was a professional boxing match contested on April 30, 2005, for the WBA heavyweight championship.

== Background ==
After Roy Jones, Jr. elected to return to fighting as a light heavyweight, an interim championship match was signed between former world champions Ruiz and Hasim Rahman. Ruiz won the fight, and after Jones decided not to return to the heavyweight division the WBA promoted him to full champion; Ruiz joined the list of fighters to have regained a piece of the heavyweight title after previously losing it, which at the time consisted of him, Evander Holyfield, Lennox Lewis, Michael Moorer, Mike Tyson, George Foreman, Tim Witherspoon, Muhammad Ali, and Floyd Patterson.

Ruiz made two defenses of his championship, defeating Fres Oquendo and getting a very controversial unanimous decision over Andrew Golota where most observers had Golota winning.

Toney, the former middleweight and super middleweight world champion, had been fighting in the cruiserweight division for some time when he faced off against previously unbeaten Vassiliy Jirov for the IBF cruiserweight championship. Toney knocked down the four-year reigning champion in the final round en route to a unanimous decision victory, taking a major world title in a third weight class. Shortly thereafter, Toney moved up to heavyweight and took on Holyfield his debut in the class, scoring a knockdown in the ninth round and forcing Holyfield's corner to stop the fight. After trying to pursue a fight with Jones, who had handed Toney his first professional defeat, he elected instead to fight Ruiz after taking a tuneup against Rydell Booker, which he won in a lopsided unanimous decision.

Going in to the fight both the WBA & WBC ranked Toney as their number 1 contender, with the IBF ranking him 3rd.

Toney was looking to join Jones and Bob Fitzsimmons as the only fighters to hold world championships at middleweight and heavyweight; he would be the first to do this without winning a major world title at light heavyweight first.

== The fight ==
Toney would control most of fight, knocking Ruiz down in the 7th round on route to a unanimous decision win, with scores of 116–111, 116-111 and 115–112. HBO's Harold Lederman also had the bout scored as 116–111 to Toney. Ruiz announced after the fight that he would be retiring.

== Aftermath ==
Several days after the fight, it was revealed that in a post-fight urine test, the anabolic steroid nandrolone was detected in Toney's sample. The WBA responded by vacating the result of the fight, returning the title to Ruiz, and forbidding Toney to fight for its world championship for a minimum of two years. In addition, Toney drew a suspension of 90 days from the New York State Athletic Commission and a fine of $10,000.

Reinstated as champion, Ruiz rescinded his retirement. However, he did not stay champion for very much longer as in his next defense against Nikolai Valuev, Ruiz lost a majority decision. He would fight twice more in his career for the WBA world championship, losing a unanimous decision in a rematch with Valuev and getting knocked out by David Haye in what would prove to be his final fight in 2010.

Toney, meanwhile, would fight only once more for a major heavyweight championship. In 2006 he took on reigning WBC champion Hasim Rahman and fought him to a majority draw, with two of the three judges scoring the bout even. He would go on to continue fighting until 2017, including a return to the cruiserweight division where he attempted to win the WBA championship (unsuccessfully), winning several fringe world championships along the way.

== Undercard ==
Confirmed bouts:

Winner	Loser	Weight division/title belt(s) disputed	Result
(Panama) Vicente Mosquera	(Thailand) Yodsanan Sor Nanthachai	WBA World super feather title	Unanimous Decision.
(United States) Ray Austin	(United States) Larry Donald	vacant WBC–USNBC heavyweight title	Majority Decision Draw.
(United States) DaVarryl Williamson	(United States) Derrick Jefferson	WBC Continental Americas/WBO NABO Heavyweight titles	2nd-round TKO.
Non-TV bouts
(Nicaragua) Luis Alberto Pérez	(Colombia) Luis Bolano	IBF World super flyweight title	6th-round TKO.
(Kenya) Evans Ashira	(United States) Quentin Smith	Middleweight (10 rounds)	Unanimous Decision.
(Puerto Rico) Israel Garcia	(Ukraine) Andriy Oliynyk	Heavyweight (6 rounds)	Unanimous Decision.
(Dominican Republic) Elio Rojas	(Nicaragua) Anthony Martinez	Featherweight (6 rounds)	Unanimous Decision.
(Ukraine) Oleksandr Harashchenko	(Albania) Elvir Muriqi	Light Heavyweight (6 rounds)	Split Decision.

== Broadcasting ==
Country	Broadcaster
Canada	TSN
France	Canal+
Philippines	Solar Sports
United Kingdom	Sky Sports
United States	HBO

Preceded by vs. Andrew Golota	John Ruiz's bouts 30 April 2005	Succeeded by vs. Nikolai Valuev
Preceded by vs. Rydell Booker	James Toney's bouts 30 April 2005	Succeeded by vs. Dominick Guinn
