= Saúl Montana =

Mexican boxer

Personal information
- Nickname: La Cobra
- Born: Saul Munoz Jr; November 23, 1970 (age 55) Acapulco, Mexico
- Height: 5 ft 11 in (180 cm)
- Weight: Light heavyweight; Cruiserweight; Super cruiserweight; Heavyweight

Boxing career
- Reach: 72 in (183 cm)
- Stance: Orthodox

Boxing record
- Total fights: 72
- Wins: 53
- Win by KO: 47
- Losses: 19

Saúl "La Cobra" Montana (born November 23, 1970) is a Mexican former professional boxer. Montana is the former IBA, NABA, WBC Mundo Hispano, WBC Continental Americas Champion at Cruiserweight, NBA, and Mexican National Champion at Heavyweight. He also challenged once for the IBF cruiserweight title in 2000.

== Professional career ==
Montana turned pro in 1988 and won the Mexican Light heavyweight title by knocking out an undefeated Isaias Lucero(21-0).

=== WBA Light Heavyweight Championship ===
In November 1993, Saul lost a shot at WBA Light heavyweight Champion, Virgil Hill in 1993. The fight was close until it was stopped.

==== Move to Cruiserweight ====
Montana moved to cruiserweight and lost to former Olympian Torsten May in 1995 and Uriah Grant in 1996.

=== IBF Cruiserweight Championship ===
Montana then beat Kenny Keene and then Grant in a rematch, setting up a shot at Vassiliy Jirov for his IBF Cruiserweight title. Montana lost via TKO and moved up to heavyweight in 2001.

==== Move to Heavyweight ====
He had success at Heavyweight, upsetting the undefeated China Smith for the NBA World heavyweight title and then defending that title by winning their rematch.

On September 11, 2010, he lost a twelve-round decision to Johnathon Banks for Johnathon's NABF Heavyweight title.

During his boxing career Montana has fought many famous fighters like Virgil Hill (twice), Uriah Grant (twice), David Tua, Dennis Bakhtov, Johnathon Banks, Torsten May, Tye Fields, Sinan Şamil Sam, Grigory Drozd, and James Toney.

== Professional boxing record ==
72 fights	53 wins	19 losses
By knockout	47	12
By decision	6	6
By disqualification	0	1

Result	Record	Opponent	Type	Round, time	Date	Location	Notes
Loss	53–19	(United States) Marselles Brown	TKO	5 (12)	2016-09-24	(Mexico) Auditorio Ernesto Rufo, Rosarito	
Loss	53–18	(Mexico) Mario Heredia	KO	2 (12)	2015-12-05	(Mexico) Gimnasio Solidaridad, Hermosillo	For vacant WBC FECOMBOX Heavyweight Title
Win	53–17	(Mexico) Jorge Valenzuela	KO	2 (10)	2013-10-05	(Mexico) Mulege	
Loss	52–17	(Mexico) Felipe Romero	MD	12 (12)	2011-05-20	(Mexico) Gimnasio Auditorio Jorge Campos, La Paz	Retained Mexican Heavyweight title
Loss	52–16	(United States) Johnathon Banks	UD	12 (12)	2010-09-11	(Germany) Commerzbank-Arena, Frankfurt	For NABF Heavyweight Title
Win	52–15	(Mexico) Ramiro Reducindo	KO	1 (12)	2010-07-30	(Mexico) Cancha Manuel Gómez Jiménez, La Paz	Retained Mexican Heavyweight title
Win	51–15	(Mexico) Alejandro De la Torre	TKO	1 (12)	2010-04-24	(Mexico) Plaza de Toros La Sanluquena, Cabo San Lucas	Retained Mexican Heavyweight title
Win	50–15	(Mexico) Jorge Valenzuela	TKO	? (12)	2008-12-07	(Mexico) San Jose del Cabo	Retained Mexican Heavyweight title
Win	49–15	(Mexico) Fernando Vicente	KO	1 (12)	2008-08-18	(Mexico) Feria de San Roque, Tuxtla Gutierrez	Retained Mexican Heavyweight title
Loss	48–15	(Samoa) David Tua	KO	1 (10)	2007-08-18	(United States) South Town Exhibition Center, Sandy	
Win	48–14	(Mexico) Mario Maciel	KO	1 (12)	2006-12-02	(Mexico) Auditorio Unidad Deportiva, Los Cabos	Retained Mexican Heavyweight title
Loss	47–14	(Turkey) Sinan Şamil Sam	UD	12 (12)	2006-07-29	(Germany) König Pilsener Arena, Oberhausen	For WBC International Heavyweight Title
Win	47–13	(Mexico) Daniel Cota	TKO	7 (10)	2006-06-17	(Mexico) Loreto	
Loss	46–13	(United States) Tye Fields	TKO	3 (10)	2005-08-05	(United States) Orleans Hotel & Casino, Las Vegas	
Win	46–12	(Russia) Dennis Bakhtov	TKO	5 (10)	2005-04-27	(Russia) Gostiny Dvor, Moscow	
Win	45–12	(Mexico) Agustin Corpus	UD	12 (12)	2004-12-03	(Mexico) La Paz	Retained Mexican Heavyweight title
Win	44–12	(United States) Gabe Brown	UD	10 (10)	2004-09-25	(United States) FedExForum, Memphis	
Win	43–12	(Mexico) Benito Quiroz	KO	5 (12)	2004-05-14	(Mexico) Nuevo Laredo	
Loss	42–12	(Russia) Grigory Drozd	TKO	9 (12)	2004-03-30	(United States) The Forum, Inglewood	Won vacant IBO Inter-Continental Cruiserweight Title
Win	42–11	(United States) Gabe Brown	TKO	1 (12)	2003-11-08	(United States) Mandalay Bay Events Center, Las Vegas	Retained WBC Continental Americas Heavyweight Title
Win	41–11	(United States) Greg Pickrom	KO	7 (12)	2003-06-16	(United States) Astrodome Raddison Hotel, Houston	Won WBC Continental Americas Heavyweight Title
Win	40–11	(Mexico) Eduardo Ayala	TKO	8 (12)	2003-03-14	(Mexico) La Paz	Retained Mexican Heavyweight title
Win	39–11	(Mexico) Ricardo Arce	KO	1 (12)	2002-12-13	(Mexico) Loreto	Retained Mexican Heavyweight title
Win	38–11	(United States) China Smith	TKO	3 (12)	2002-10-05	(United States) USF Sun Dome, Tampa	Retained NBA Heavyweight title
Win	37–11	(Mexico) Nestor Maciel	TKO	2 (12)	2002-08-30	(Mexico) La Paz	Won Mexican Heavyweight title
Win	36–11	(United States) China Smith	TKO	7 (12)	2002-04-19	(United States) USF Sun Dome, Tampa	Won NBA Heavyweight title
Loss	35–11	(Cuba) Ramón Garbey	TKO	8 (12)	2001-11-03	(United States) Miccosukee Indian Gaming Resort, Miami	For vacant IBA Continental Super Cruiserweight title
Win	35–10	(Mexico) Carlos Sandoval	TKO	4 (?)	2001-10-27	(Mexico) Los Cabos	
Loss	34–10	(United States) James Toney	TKO	2 (12)	2001-03-29	(United States) Cobo Center, Detroit	For vacant IBA Super Cruiserweight title
Loss	34–9	(United States) Jason Robinson	UD	12 (12)	2001-02-02	(United States) Hilton Hotel, Reno	Won WBC Continental Americas Cruiserweight Title
Win	34–8	(United States) Ricardo Phillips	KO	1 (?)	2000-12-02	Mexico	
Loss	33–8	(Dominica) Louis Azille	KO	1 (10)	2000-09-16	(United States) MGM Grand Garden Arena, Las Vegas	
Loss	33–7	(Kazakhstan) Vassiliy Jirov	TKO	9 (12)	2000-02-12	(United States) CenturyLink Arena, Boise	For IBF Cruiserweight title
Win	33–6	(United States) George Stevens	KO	1 (10)	1999-05-15	(United States) Jai Alai Fronton, Miami	
Win	32–6	(United States) Tiwon Taylor	TKO	1 (12)	Aug 28, 1998	(United States) Las Vegas Hilton, Las Vegas	Retained NABA Cruiserweight title
Win	31–6	(Jamaica) Uriah Grant	TKO	12 (12)	1998-02-21	(United States) Miccosukee Indian Gaming Resort, Miami	Won vacant NABA Cruiserweight title
Win	30–6	(United States) Kenny Keene	UD	12 (12)	1997-10-14	(United States) CenturyLink Arena, Boise	Won IBA Cruiserweight title
Win	29–6	(Mexico) Cesar Rendon	UD	10 (10)	1997-08-30	(United States) Spotlight 29 Casino, Coachella	
Win	28–6	(Mexico) Cesar Rendon	UD	10 (10)	1997-06-10	(United States) Ontario	
Loss	27–6	(Jamaica) Uriah Grant	KO	3 (10)	1996-12-07	(United States) Fantasy Springs Resort Casino, Indio	
Win	27–5	(United States) Keith McMurray	TKO	5 (10)	1996-10-07	(Venezuela) Maracay	
Win	26–5	(United States) Jimmy Bills	TKO	4 (?)	1996-06-29	(United States) Fantasy Springs Resort Casino, Indio	
Win	25–5	(Mexico) Jaime Munguia	KO	1 (10)	1995-09-22	(United States) Spotlight 29 Casino, Coachella	
Loss	24–5	(Germany) Torsten May	UD	10 (10)	1995-03-25	(Germany) Düsseldorf	
Win	24–4	(Mexico) Pedro Salinas	KO	3 (?)	1995-02-03	(Mexico) Acapulco	
Win	23–4	(United States) Jade Scott	TKO	3 (10)	1994-11-01	(United States) MGM Grand Garden Arena, Las Vegas	
Win	22–4	(Argentina) Jose Arnaldo Balbuena	TKO	1 (12)	1994-05-13	(Mexico) La Paz	Won WBC Mundo Hispano Cruiserweight Title
Loss	21–4	(United States) Virgil Hill	TKO	10 (12)	1993-11-09	(United States) Fargodome, Fargo	For WBA Light heavyweight title
Win	21–3	(Mexico) Jaime Munguia	KO	3 (10)	1993-09-28	(Mexico) La Paz	
Win	20–3	(Dominican Republic) Jorge Amparo	PTS	10 (10)	1993-05-11	(Mexico) Tijuana	
Loss	19–3	(Mexico) Isaias Lucero	PTS	12 (12)	1992-12-19	(Mexico) La Paz	Lost Mexican Light heavyweight title
Win	19–2	(Mexico) Mario Osuna	KO	1 (12)	1992-08-29	(Mexico) La Paz	Retained Mexican Light heavyweight title
Win	18–2	(Mexico) Salvador Maciel	TKO	6 (12)	1992-05-15	(Mexico) La Paz	Won Mexican Light heavyweight title
Loss	17–2	(Mexico) Salvador Maciel	DQ	7 (12)	1992-02-14	(Mexico) La Paz	Lost Mexican Light heavyweight title
Win	17–1	(Mexico) Javier Pena	KO	1 (12)	1991-12-21	(Mexico) San Jose del Cabo	Retained Mexican Light heavyweight title
Win	16–1	(Mexico) Isaias Lucero	KO	1 (12)	1991-10-18	(Mexico) La Paz	Won Mexican Light heavyweight title
Win	15–1	(Mexico) Martin Lopez	KO	1 (?)	1991-05-03	(Mexico) La Paz	
Win	14–1	(United States) Antonio Ramos	KO	2 (?)	1991-04-05	Mexico City	
Win	13–1	(Mexico) Guillermo Chavez	KO	2 (?)	1991-03-10	Mexico City	
Win	12–1	(Mexico) Rosendo Rosales	TKO	3 (?)	1991-02-01	Mexico City	
Win	11–1	(Mexico) Mario Felix	KO	1 (?)	1991-01-05	Mexico City	
Win	10–1	(Mexico) Mario Osuna	KO	10 (?)	1990-11-16	(Mexico) La Paz	
Win	9–1	(Mexico) Carlos Mendoza	KO	1 (?)	1990-10-05	(Mexico) San Jose del Cabo	
Win	8–1	(Mexico) Javier Pena	KO	5 (8)	1990-08-31	(Mexico) La Paz	
Win	7–1	(Mexico) Manuel Soto	KO	2 (?)	1990-07-07	(Mexico) San Jose del Cabo	
Win	6–1	(Mexico) Emeterio Soto	KO	1 (?)	1990-06-15	(Mexico) Poliforum, Los Mochis	
Win	5–1	(Uruguay) Sergio Gonzalez	KO	3 (?)	1990-05-10	(Mexico) Puerto Vallarta	
Win	4–1	(Mexico) Jorge Vilchis	KO	4 (?)	1990-02-09	(Mexico) Acapulco	
Win	3–1	(Mexico) Mauro Ruiz	KO	2 (?)	1990-01-06	(Mexico) Nuevo Laredo	
Win	2–1	(Mexico) Alberto Castillo	KO	1 (?)	1989-12-21	(Mexico) Nuevo Laredo	
Win	1–1	(Mexico) Jorge Ceron	KO	1 (?)	1989-05-12	(Mexico) Nuevo Laredo	
Loss	0–1	(United States) Troy Weaver	KO	1 (6)	1988-11-29	(United States) Country Club, Reseda	Professional debut
