= Evander Holyfield vs. James Toney =

2003 boxing match

The War on October 4
- Date: October 4, 2003
- Venue: Mandalay Bay Events Center, Paradise, Nevada

Tale of the tape
Boxer	Evander Holyfield	James Toney
Nickname	The Real Deal	Lights Out
Hometown	Atlanta, Georgia, U.S.	Grand Rapids, Michigan, U.S.
Pre-fight record	38–6–2 (25 KO)	66–4–2 (42 KO)
Age	40 years, 11 months	35 years, 1 month
Height	6 ft 2 in (188 cm)	5 ft 9 in (175 cm)
Weight	219 lb (99 kg)	217 lb (98 kg)
Style	Orthodox	Orthodox
Recognition	WBC; No. 4 Ranked Heavyweight; IBF; No. 5 Ranked Heavyweight; WBO; No. 9 Ranked Heavyweight; WBA; No. 12 Ranked Heavyweight; 2-division undisputed world champion	IBF; Cruiserweight Champion; 3-division world champion

Result
- Toney wins by technical knockout in round 9

Evander Holyfield vs. James Toney, billed as The War on October 4, was a professional boxing match contested on October 4, 2003.

== Background ==
In June 2003, it was announced that former 4-time world heavyweight champion Evander Holyfield would face reigning IBF cruiserweight champion James Toney in a non-title bout set for October 4, 2003.

Holyfield's previous fight had been a loss to Chris Byrd in an IBF heavyweight title fight. Following the loss, Holyfield had entered negotiations with promoter Don King to face then-WBA heavyweight champion Roy Jones Jr. Jones' promoter claimed Holyfield was offered a $10 million purse, but negotiations fell through when Holyfield demanded an additional $2 million added on because he claimed King owed him such. After the proposed Holyfield–Jones fight fell through, Holyfield instead reached an agreement to face Toney Toney had won the IBF cruiserweight title in April by defeating Vassiliy Jirov, giving him his first major title since 1994 and making him a 3-division world champion as he had previously captured titles in both the middleweight and super middleweight divisions. Toney and his promoter Dan Goossen had agreed that if Toney beat Jirov for the cruiserweight title, then he could "do what he wanted." After doing so, Toney then decided to move up to the heavyweight division.

Going in to the fight Holyfield was ranked as the 4th Heavyweight in the world by Ring magazine, as well as in the top 5 by both the WBC & IBF.

== The fight ==
Holyfield got off to a good start in the fight, winning two of the first three rounds on two of the judge's scorecards and all three on the other judge's scorecards. However, from the fourth round on, Toney would dominate Holyfield, punishing him with a series of powerful combinations and left hooks and winning every round from then on. After punishing Holyfield for 5+ rounds, Toney was finally able to breakthrough with a knockdown in round nine after landing left hook to the body caused Holyfield to collapse to the mat. Holyfield would get back up, but his trainer Don Turner decided to stop the fight by throwing in the towel, automatically giving Toney the victory by technical knockout at 1:42 of the round.

== Aftermath ==
Though Holyfield admitted after the fight that "Toney did beat me up" and there were calls for his retirement following consecutive defeats, Holyfield decided to put retirement off, stating "No, I'm not going to retire, I'm going back to the drawing board."

Despite some interest in a rematch with Roy Jones Jr., Toney would have one more fight against Rydell Booker, before agreeing to face WBA champion John Ruiz.

== Fight card ==
Confirmed bouts:

Weight Class	Weight		vs.		Method	Round	Notes
Heavyweight	200+ lb	James Toney	def.	Evander Holyfield	TKO	9/12
Super Featherweight	126 lb	Joel Casamayor	def.	Diego Corrales	TKO	6/12	^{Note 1}
Bantamweight	118 lb	Cruz Carbajal (c)	def	Gerardo Espinoza	TKO	8/12	^{Note 2}
Middleweight	160 lb	Keith Holmes	def	Jason Papillion	TKO	8/8

^Note 1 For IBA Super Featherweight title
^Note 2 For WBO Bantamweight title

== Broadcasting ==
Country	Broadcaster
Australia	Main Event
United States	Showtime

Preceded by vs. Chris Byrd	Evander Holyfield's bouts 4 October 2003	Succeeded by vs. Larry Donald
Preceded by vs. Vassiliy Jirov	James Toney's bouts 4 October 2003	Succeeded by vs. Rydell Booker
