= Stephan Shaw =

American boxer

Personal information
- Nickname: Big Shot
- Nationality: American
- Born: September 20, 1992 (age 33) St. Louis, Missouri, U.S.
- Height: 6 ft 4 in (193 cm)
- Weight: Heavyweight

Boxing career
- Stance: Orthodox

Boxing record
- Total fights: 24
- Wins: 21
- Win by KO: 16
- Losses: 2
- No contests: 1

Stephen Shaw (born September 20, 1992) is an American professional boxer from Florissant, MO.

== Amateur career ==
As an amateur he was a four-time national champion and had a record of 51–9 before turning professional.

== Professional career ==
Shaw made his professional debut on December 13, 2013, scoring a first-round knockout (KO) over Jose Hermosillo at the Fantasy Springs Resort Casino in Indio, California.

== Professional boxing record ==
| 21 fights | 18 wins | 2 losses |
|---|---|---|
| By knockout | 13 | 1 |
| By decision | 5 | 1 |
| No contests | 1 | |

| No. | Result | Record | Opponent | Type | Round, time | Date | Location | Notes |
|---|---|---|---|---|---|---|---|---|
| 21 | Loss | 18–2 (1) | (Australia) Joseph Goodall | TKO | 6 (8), 2:55 | Jul 22, 2023 | (United States) Firelake Arena, Shawnee, Oklahoma, US | |
| 20 | Loss | 18–1 (1) | (Nigeria) Efe Ajagba | UD | 10 | Jan 14, 2023 | (United States) Turning Stone Resort Casino, Verona, California, U.S. | |
| 19 | Win | 18–0 (1) | (United States) Rydell Booker | UD | 8 | Nov 22, 2022 | (United States) Edison Ballroom, Manhattan, U.S. | |
| 18 | Win | 17–0 (1) | (United States) Bernardo Marquez | KO | 1 (8), 2:35 | Jul 15, 2022 | (United States) Pechanga Resort & Casino, Temecula, U.S. | |
| 17 | Win | 16–0 (1) | (United States) Joey Dawejko | TKO | 8 (8), 1:04 | Jan 21, 2022 | (United States) Hard Rock Hotel & Casino, Tulsa, U.S. | |
| 16 | Win | 15–0 (1) | (United States) Nick Davis | TKO | 1 (6), 3:00 | Aug 27, 2021 | (United States) Plant City, Florida, U.S. | |
| 15 | Win | 14–0 (1) | (Ukraine) Lyubomyr Pinchuk | UD | 8 | Dec 17, 2020 | (United States) Wild Card Boxing Club, Los Angeles, California, U.S. | |
| 14 | Win | 13–0 (1) | (United States) Gregory Corbin | TKO | 3 (10), 2:14 | Dec 5, 2019 | (United States) Terminal 5, New York City, New York, U.S. | |
| 13 | Win | 12–0 (1) | (United States) Willie Jake Jr. | TKO | 4 (8), 0:56 | Aug 29, 2019 | (United States) Foxwoods Resort Casino, Mashantucket, Connecticut, U.S. | |
| 12 | Win | 11–0 (1) | (United States) Donovan Dennis | KO | 3 (8) | Mar 2, 2019 | (United States) Voinovich Center, Columbus, Ohio, U.S. | |
| 11 | Win | 10–0 (1) | (United States) Aaron Chavers | TKO | 1 (8), 1:00 | Oct 27, 2018 | (United States) Lakefront Arena, New Orleans, Louisiana, U.S. | |
| 10 | NC | 9–0 (1) | (United States) Joel Caudle | NC | 6 | Feb 7, 2018 | (United States) BB King Blues Bar & Grill, New York City, New York, U.S. | |
| 9 | Win | 9–0 | (United States) Kris Renty | TKO | 1 (4), 2:59 | May 12, 2017 | (United States) Heart of St. Charles Banquet Center, St. Charles, Missouri, U.S. | |
| 8 | Win | 8–0 | (United States) Jonathan Rice | UD | 6 | Aug 27, 2016 | (United States) Honda Center, Anaheim, California, U.S. | |
| 7 | Win | 7–0 | (United States) Danny Kelly | UD | 6 | May 17, 2016 | (United States) Black Bear Casino, Carlton, Minnesota, U.S. | |
| 6 | Win | 6–0 | (United States) Dan Biddle | KO | 1 (6), 1:45 | Dec 3, 2015 | (United States) The Hangar, Costa Mesa, California, U.S. | |
| 5 | Win | 5–0 | (United States) Randy Easton | TKO | 1 (4), 0:39 | Sep 15, 2015 | (United States) California University of Pennsylvania, California, Pennsylvania, U.S. | |
| 4 | Win | 4–0 | (United States) Rex Harris | UD | 4 | Apr 25, 2015 | (United States) Harrah's Philadelphia, Chester, Pennsylvania, U.S. | |
| 3 | Win | 3–0 | (United States) Kevin Howard | KO | 2 (4), 2:05 | Apr 3, 2014 | (United States) Fantasy Springs Resort Casino, Indio, California, U.S. | |
| 2 | Win | 2–0 | (United States) Kyle McNutt | TKO | 4 (4), 2:32 | Jan 24, 2014 | (United States) Little Creek Casino Resort, Shelton, Washington, U.S. | |
| 1 | Win | 1–0 | (United States) Jose Hermosillo | KO | 1 (4), 0:47 | Dec 13, 2013 | (United States) Fantasy Springs Resort Casino, Indio, California, U.S. | |
