= Taoufik Belbouli =

Tunisian boxer

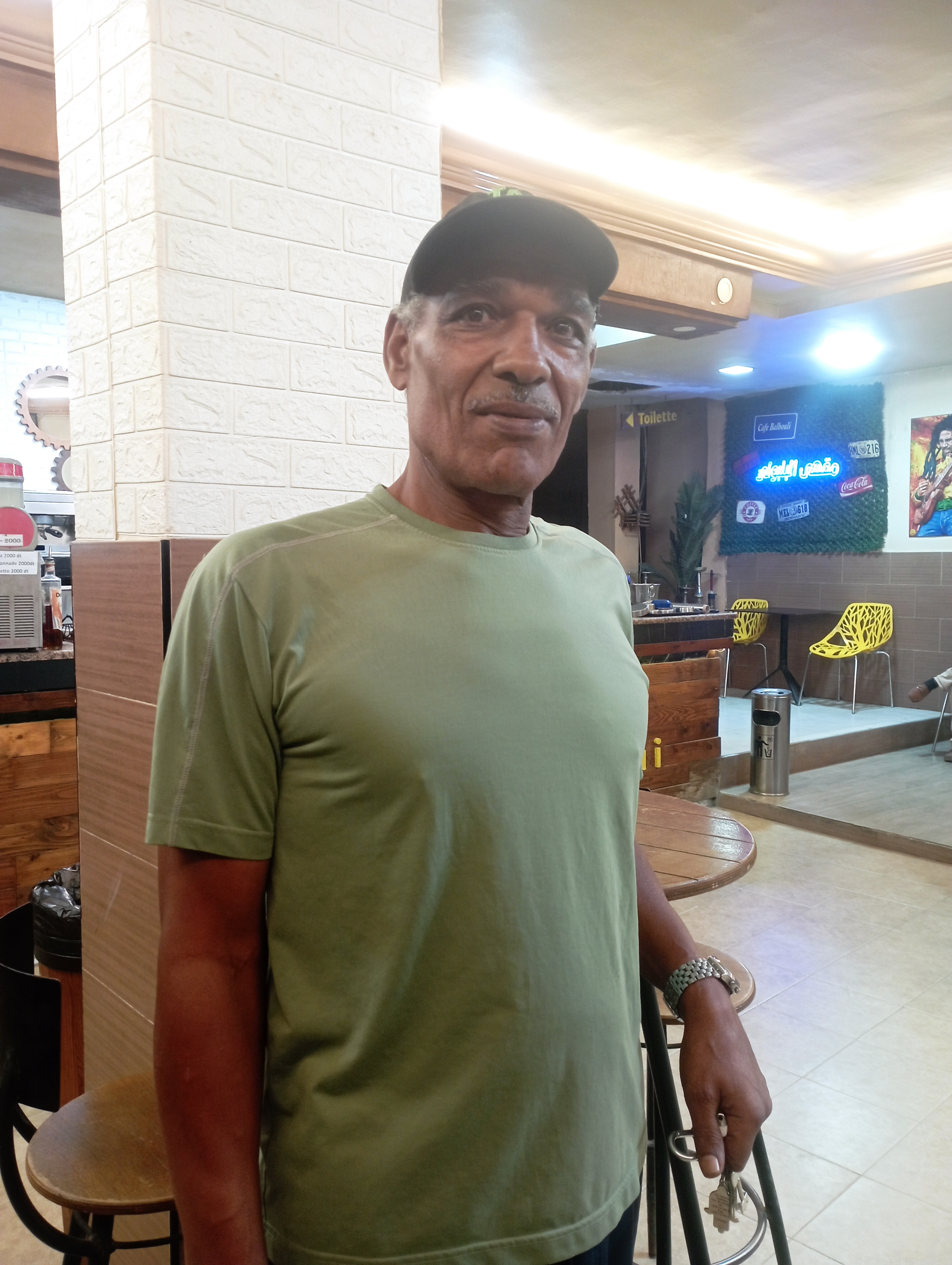

Personal information
- Nationality: (Tunisia) Tunisian
- Born: Taoufik Belbouli; 10 December 1954 (age 71) La Soukra, Tunisia
- Height: 6 ft 1 in (185 cm)
- Weight: Cruiserweight; Heavyweight

Boxing career
- Stance: Orthodox

Boxing record
- Total fights: 31
- Wins: 29
- Win by KO: 23
- Losses: 1
- Draws: 1

Taoufik Belbouli (born 10 December 1954 in Tunisia) is a retired French Tunisian professional boxer. He briefly held the WBA cruiserweight title from 1989 until 1990, relinquishing the belt due to injury.

== Professional career ==
Belbouli turned pro in 1982 and won the vacant WBA cruiserweight title with a TKO win over Michael Greer in March 1989 in Morocco. He vacated the title six months later, never defending it, but tried to regain it in November 1990 when he fought his successor as champion, Robert Daniels. He announced his retirement after the bout, which finished a draw.

== Professional boxing record ==
31 fights	29 wins	1 loss
By knockout	23	0
By decision	5	1
By disqualification	1	0
Draws	1	

Result	Record	Opponent	Type	Round, time	Date	Location	Notes
Draw	29–1–1	(United States) Robert Daniels	MD	12	22/11/1990	(Spain) Palacio de los Deportes, Madrid	For WBA cruiserweight title
Win	29–1	(Suriname) John Held	TKO	7 (10)	24/03/1990	(France) Ajaccio	
Win	28–1	(United States) Michael Greer	TKO	8 (12)	25/03/1989	(Morocco) Sheraton Hotel, Casablanca	Won vacant WBA cruiserweight title
Win	27–1	(United States) Michael Johnson	TKO	1 (10)	06/03/1989	(France) Nogent-sur-Marne	
Win	26–1	(United States) Roy Safford	TKO	4 (10)	10/10/1988	(France) Nogent-sur-Marne	
Win	25–1	(United States) Lorenzo Boyd	TKO	2 (10)	13/08/1988	(France) Casino de Deauville, Deauville	
Win	24–1	(United States) Terry Mims	KO	5 (10)	15/05/1988	(Morocco) Casablanca	
Win	23–1	(United States) Lionel Byarm	KO	7 (10)	03/03/1988	(Morocco) Casablanca	
Win	22–1	(United States) Marvin Camel	TKO	4 (10)	10/10/1987	(France) Zenith Palais, Paris	
Win	21–1	(United States) Ricardo Spain	KO	9 (10)	15/08/1987	(France) Parking de Nouveau Port, Saint-Tropez	
Win	20–1	(Uganda) Peter Mulindwa Kozza	KO	1 (10)	19/07/1987	(France) Saint-Tropez	
Win	19–1	(Mexico) Antonio Arvizu	KO	1 (10)	08/06/1987	(France) Mérignac	
Win	18–1	(United States) James Dixon	PTS	8 (8)	12/05/1987	(France) Le Mans	
Win	17–1	(Democratic Republic of the Congo) Mbuyanba Kalombo	TKO	9 (10)	03/04/1987	(France) Nimes	
Win	16–1	(Cameroon) Louis Pergaud	KO	4 (6)	12/09/1986	(France) Aix-en-Provence	
Win	15–1	(Democratic Republic of the Congo) Mbuyanba Kalombo	KO	4 (6)	15/05/1986	(France) Stade Pierre-de-Coubertin, Paris	
Win	14–1	(Guyana) Damien Marignan	TKO	3 (10)	18/04/1986	(France) Marseille	Won France Heavyweight Title
Loss	13–1	(Uganda) Yawe Davis	PTS	8 (8)	01/06/1985	(France) Parc des Princes, Paris	
Win	13–0	(France) Safir Digibele	TKO	4 (8)	29/03/1985	(France) Aix-en-Provence	
Win	12–0	(Tunisia) Benchabak	KO	7 (8)	05/09/1984	(Tunisia) Tunis	
Win	11–0	(France) Ahcene Reffas	TKO	1 (8)	06/07/1984	(France) Marseille	
Win	10–0	(Italy) Marco Vitagliano	DQ	3 (8)	19/04/1984	(France) Aix-en-Provence	
Win	9–0	(Serbia) Dragomir Milo Popovic	TKO	1 (8)	17/03/1984	(Tunisia) Tunis	
Win	8–0	(Democratic Republic of the Congo) Ali Lukasa	KO	2 (8)	02/02/1984	(France) Parc Chanot, Marseille	
Win	7–0	(Guyana) Damien Marignan	PTS	6 (6)	27/01/1984	(France) Aix-en-Provence	
Win	6–0	(Fiji) Aisea Nama	TKO	3 (10)	10/12/1983	(New Caledonia) Omni Sports Stadium, Noumea	
Win	5–0	(Italy) Marco Vitagliano	PTS	8 (8)	12/11/1983	(Tunisia) Tunis	
Win	4–0	(Senegal) Maurice Gomis	PTS	8 (8)	05/08/1983	(France) Les Arenes, Nimes	
Win	3–0	(Senegal) Maurice Gomis	PTS	8 (8)	30/06/1983	(France) Aix-en-Provence	
Win	2–0	(France) Fred Voltine	TKO	4 (4)	10/02/1983	(France) Salle Vallier, Marseille	
Win	1–0	(Italy) Primo Ruberti	TKO	2 (4)	25/11/1982	(France) Marseille	

== See also ==
- List of cruiserweight boxing champions

Achievements
Vacant Title last held by Evander Holyfield	WBA cruiserweight champion 25 March 1989 - 11 August 1989; Vacated	Vacant Title next held by Robert Daniels
