= María Toto =

Panamanian boxing trainer and coach (1945–2026)

- Born: 3 May 1945; Colón, Panama
- Died: 8 September 2026 (aged 81)
- Occupation: Boxing trainer/coach

María de la Cruz Murillo (3 May 1945 – 8 September 2026), known as María Toto, was a Panamanian boxing trainer and coach. She began her sporting career as a women's softball coach, before being introduced to boxing in the late 1970s or early 1980s. One of the few women in the field in Panama, Murillo coached boxers including Celestino Caballero, Luis Concepción, Roberto Durán, Guillermo Jones, Vicente Mosquera, and Roberto Vásquez.

== Early life ==
Murillo was born on 3 May 1945, in Colón, Panama. Her father, Luis Murillo, was a line handler originally from Barranquilla; according to Murillo, he physically abused her as a child. One of fifteen children, Murillo described herself as rebellious and disobedient, prone to fighting and stealing. When she was seven, she moved away from her father in Colón to stay with an uncle in El Chorrillo, though she hardly saw him. Throughout her adolescence and young adulthood, she lived in various regions of Panama including Santa Ana, San Pedro, and the San Miguelito District.

== Career ==
Murillo began her sports career as a coach for a women's softball team; when travelling to Costa Rica with the team on one occasion, she was given the nickname 'Toto'. She was introduced to boxing in the late 1970s or early 1980s by the journalist fellow boxing coach Gaspar Mendizábal. After training his boxing students at a gym run by Eugenio Luzcando, she was given her own gym to manage by Pellín Ávila. She subsequently worked for the boxing promoter Rogelio Espiño and gym owner Luis Espada. By the 2010s, she was working at the Los Rockeros gym in Panama.

She was one of the first and only female boxing trainers in Panama and her career spanned over forty years. In 2013, she was honored at the San Miguelito District City Hall for her contributions to the sport. Murillo coached boxers including Rosendo Álvarez, Celestino Caballero, Luis Concepción, Víctor Córdoba, Roberto Durán, Guillermo Jones, Carlos Melo, Vicente Mosquera, Carlos Murillo, and Roberto Vásquez. To support herself, Murillo worked a variety of jobs, including as a courier, elevator operator, selling newspapers, and at a racetrack; she also worked in government jobs.

Murillo did not support women's boxing.

== Personal life and death ==
Murillo had one child, a son, whose father was a jockey. She had medical issues which affected her spine and knees. In the 1970s, she was hit by a car and hospitalized for six months, during which the doctors put a plate into her leg.

She died on 8 September 2026; her death was announced to the public the following day. She died on the same day as Panamanian boxer Ismael Laguna. Archbishop of Panama José Domingo Ulloa Mendieta extended his condolences following her death.
