= James Toney vs. Rydell Booker =

Boxing match

The Best Damn Heavyweight Period!
- Date: September 23, 2004
- Venue: Pechanga Resort Casino, Temecula, California, U.S.
- Title(s) on the line: WBC Continental Americas and IBA heavyweight titles

Tale of the tape
Boxer	James Toney	Rydell Booker
Nickname	Lights Out	Rock n' Rye
Hometown	Grand Rapids, Michigan, U.S.	Detroit, Michigan, U.S.
Pre-fight record	67–4–2 (43 KO)	22–0 (12 KO)
Age	36 years	23 years, 7 months
Height	5 ft 9 in (175 cm)	6 ft 3 in (191 cm)
Weight	227 lb (103 kg)	220 lb (100 kg)
Style	Orthodox	Orthodox
Recognition	WBC/WBO; No. 1 Ranked Heavyweight; WBA/The Ring; No. 3 Ranked Heavyweight; IBF; No. 4 Ranked Heavyweight; 3-division world champion	WBC; No. 7 Ranked Heavyweight

Result
- Toney wins via unanimous decision (120–107, 118–108, 117–110)

James Toney vs. Rydell Booker, billed as The Best Damn Heavyweight Period!, was a professional boxing match contested on September 23, 2004, for the WBC Continental Americas and IBA heavyweight titles.

== Background ==
After winning the IBF cruiserweight title from the previously undefeated Vassiliy Jirov to become a three-division world champion, James Toney moved up to heavyweight, winning his first bout in the division after knocking out aging former four-time heavyweight champion Evander Holyfield in the ninth round. The victory over Holyfield put Toney into heavyweight title contention and his next fight was scheduled to take place on February 7, 2004, against heavyweight contender Jameel McCline in what was to be an IBF eliminator fight in which the winner would become the mandatory challenger to IBF heavyweight champion Chris Byrd. However, an achilles injury suffered during a sparring session two weeks before the fight forced Toney to pull out and kept him sidelined for nearly an entire year.

It was announced in July that Toney would return in late September to take on undefeated 23-year old heavyweight prospect, and fellow Michigan native, Rydell Booker. In addition to the WBC Continental Americas and IBA heavyweight titles being on the line, the fight was a WBC heavyweight title eliminator, with the winner becoming the number-one contender to WBC heavyweight champion John Ruiz. The fight was aired live on an episode of The Best Damn Sports Show Period on Fox Sports Net and featured commentary from Max Kellerman, who hosted I, Max on the network, and Barry Tompkins and Sean O'Grady, the commentators of Sunday Night Fights, which also aired on FSN.

== The Fight ==
Toney rebounded from a left triceps injury in the first round, to win a lopsided unanimous decision. Despite the early injury, Toney served as the aggressor from the opening bell and pounded Booker throughout. Toney was able to score the fight's lone knockdown, forcing Booker to take a knee after landing a series of hard shots midway through the eighth round. Booker took a standing eight-count and despite continuing to take a beating, was able to finish the fight. One Judge had Toney winning all 12 rounds with a score of 120–107 while the other two judges gave Booker three and two rounds respectively with scores of 117–110 and 118–108.

== Fight card ==
Confirmed bouts:

Weight Class	Weight		vs.		Method	Round	Notes
Heavyweight	200+ lbs.	James Toney	def.	Rydell Booker	UD	12/12	^{note 1}
Heavyweight	200+ lbs.	David Bostice	def.	Cisse Salif	UD	10/10
Light Middleweight	154 lbs.	Mark Suárez	def.	Bradley Jensen	TKO	3/10
Super Featherweight	130 lbs.	Wayne McCullough	def.	Mike Juarez	TKO	2/8
Cruiserweight	190 lbs.	Johnathon Banks	def.	Tihomir Dukic	UD	4/4
Heavyweight	200+ lbs.	Travis Walker	def.	David Johnson	MD	4/4

^Note 1 For WBC Continental Americas and IBA heavyweight titles

== Broadcasting ==
Country	Broadcaster
United States	Fox Sports Net

Preceded by vs. Evander Holyfield	James Toney's bouts 23 September 2004	Succeeded by vs. John Ruiz
Preceded by vs. Tipton Walker	Rydell Booker's bouts 23 September 2004	Succeeded by vs. Rodney Moore
