= James Toney =

American boxer (born 1968)

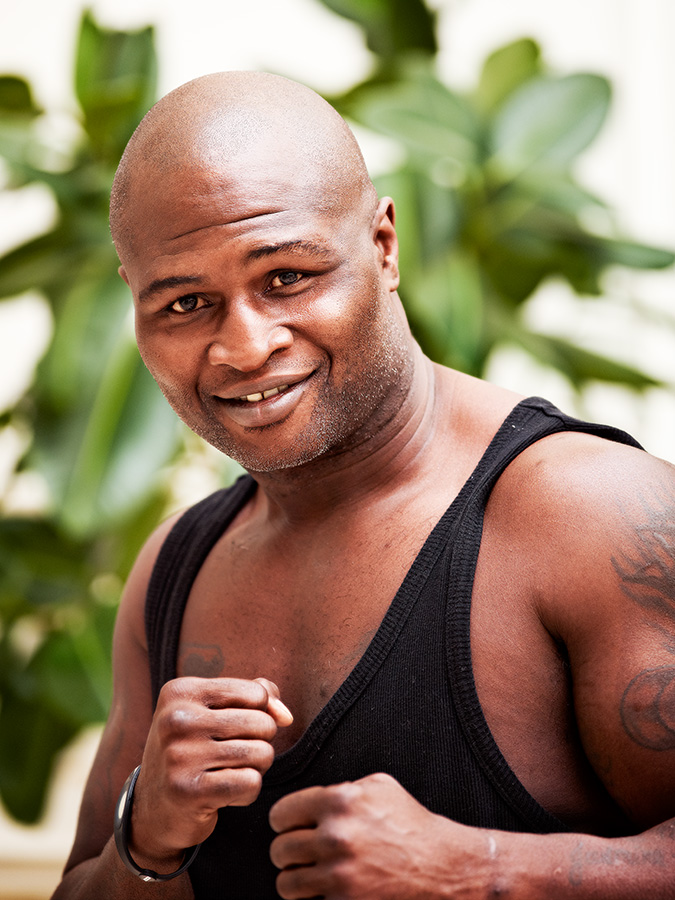
- Toney in 2011
- Born: James Nathaniel Toney; August 24, 1968 (age 58); Ann Arbor, Michigan, U.S.
- Other names: Lights Out; The Dark Emperor
- Height: 5 ft 9 in (175 cm)
- Division: Middleweight; Super middleweight; Light heavyweight; Cruiserweight; Heavyweight
- Reach: 74 in (188 cm)
- Stance: Orthodox
- Years active: 1988–2017, 2023 (boxing); 2010 (MMA)

Professional boxing record
- Total: 92
- Wins: 77
- By knockout: 47
- Losses: 10
- Draws: 3
- No contests: 2

Mixed martial arts record
- Total: 1
- Wins: 0
- Losses: 1
- By submission: 1

Other information
- Boxing record from BoxRec
- Mixed martial arts record from Sherdog
- Last updated on: June 5, 2017

James Nathaniel Toney (born August 24, 1968) is an American former professional boxer who competed from 1988 to 2017. He held multiple world championships in three weight classes, including the International Boxing Federation (IBF) and lineal middleweight titles from 1991 to 1993, the IBF super middleweight title from 1993 to 1994, and the IBF cruiserweight title in 2003. Toney also challenged twice for a world heavyweight title in 2005 and 2006, and while he was victorious the first time, his championship was annulled due to a failed drug test that caused his initial victory to be overturned to a no contest. Overall, he competed in fifteen world title fights across four weight classes.

Stylistically a defensive boxer, Toney utilized the shoulder roll technique taught to him by veteran trainer Bill Miller, who had once trained heavyweight champion Ezzard Charles. Toney was an exceptional counterpuncher and inside fighter, who often preferred to fight off the ropes. He possessed fast hand speed and respectable punching power throughout his career and is also noted for his toughness, having never lost any of his 92 professional bouts via stoppage.

In 1991 and 2003, Toney was voted Fighter of the Year by The Ring magazine and the Boxing Writers Association of America. In 2011, The Ring magazine ranked him as tenth on their list of the "10 best middleweight title holders of the last 50 years." He is also widely considered one of the greatest defensive boxers of all time.

He has also made a one-time appearance in mixed martial arts, losing to Randy Couture at UFC 118. In 2001, Toney played the role of Joe Frazier in the movie Ali alongside Will Smith. He is also an inductee into the International Boxing Hall of Fame.

== Early life ==
Toney was born in Ann Arbor, Michigan, U.S. At around age 11, Toney first entered a boxing gym, but did not seriously pursue the sport until graduating high school. Growing up, Toney lived alongside the families of Floyd Mayweather Jr. and Buster Mathis Jr., and Toney's father himself (who was absent for Toney's upbringing) was a boxer. As a teen, Toney was often involved in street fighting and sold crack cocaine. Prior to his career in boxing, Toney was also a star football player; after high school he received scholarship offers from Western Michigan to play quarterback and from Michigan to play as a defensive back. But Toney said, "I wasn't a team player and wasn't good at taking orders. So I went into boxing." Toney also lost a significant amount of weight to begin his boxing career, having weighed 205 lbs. Toney was supposedly involved in an altercation with future Pro Football Hall of Famer Deion Sanders while at a Michigan training camp.

== Amateur career ==
Toney had a brief but relatively successful amateur career, compiling a record of 33 wins (32 KOs) and 2 losses. Toney had his first professional fight on October 26, 1988, beating Stephen Lee by a technical knockout in the second round. As a teenager, Toney was scouted and trained by Gregory Owens, who also was his trainer through the mid-nineties. His moniker of "Lights Out" was also given by either Gregory or his son. In his 7th pro fight, Toney's manager, Johnny "Ace" Smith, was killed. Afterwards, Jackie Kallen was hired as his manager. Toney also employed the services of legendary Detroit-based trainer Bill Miller. Miller, a former boxer himself who worked in Detroit's famed Kronk Gym and assisted hall-of-fame trainer Emanuel Steward at times, is credited with developing Toney's famed "old school" or "throwback" style of fighting.

== Professional career ==
=== Middleweight ===
Toney won the IBF and lineal middleweight titles by knocking out Michael Nunn in eleven rounds in May 1991. Toney, who entered as a 20-to-1 underdog, was down on all three judges' scorecards, but landed a left hook that put Nunn on the canvas in the eleventh round, and eventually scored a stoppage victory. The win also earned Toney the Ring Magazine Fighter Of The Year award. He wore a Star of David to honor his manager, Jackie Kallen. Toney continued a regular fight program over the next 18 months at middleweight, before outgrowing the division, where he made several successful yet disputed defenses. The most noteworthy was Toney's split decision win over Dave Tiberi in a fight that many experts feel Toney lost. The decision was so controversial that it prompted United States Senator William Roth of Delaware to call for an investigation into possible corruption in the sport. Toney also won a split decision title defense against Reggie Johnson in June 1991, retained his title with a draw against former WBA champ Mike McCallum in December 1991, and again against McCallum, this time by a majority decision, in December 1992. The McCallum fight would be Toney's last as a middleweight.

=== Super middleweight ===
On February 13, 1993, Toney challenged Iran Barkley for the IBF super middleweight title. After a dominating performance by Toney, the bout was stopped after 9 rounds by Barkley's trainer, Eddie Mustafa Muhammad, due to Barkley suffering severe swelling around both eyes.

Toney won five fights throughout 1993, then defeated Tony "The Punching Postman" Thornton in his 1st title defense in October, via a landslide points victory. In his second defense, Toney beat the 24–0 Tim Littles by a 4th-round KO. During this bout, Toney suffered a bad cut which caused the referee and ringside doctor to intervene before round 4, allowing him one more round to try to end the fight. His next defense was against former IBF Light Heavyweight champion Prince Charles Williams. Despite having a point deducted for hitting Williams after the bell in one round and having his left eye completely swollen shut, Toney knocked Williams out in the 12th and final round. This win paved the way for his fight with undefeated 1988 Olympic silver medalist Roy Jones Jr.

==== Toney vs. Jones Jr. ====
Jones won a landslide decision over Toney, an upset at the time, briefly flooring Toney for the first time with a flash knockdown in the 3rd round. Jones used one of his "cockfighting" feints to lure Toney in, and as Toney mocked Jones, Toney got caught with a leaping left hook. After the fight Toney blamed making the weight for his flat performance and the loss of his cherished unbeaten record. It was his last fight at the weight.

=== Light heavyweight ===
His next fight saw him lose to Montell Griffin at light heavyweight in February 1995. After then winning a series of fights at light heavyweight, cruiserweight, and even heavyweight, he again faced Montell Griffin in December 1996 and once again lost a close decision. He beat old foe Mike McCallum in February 1997, but then lost to journeyman Drake Thadzi in his next fight.

=== Cruiserweight ===
After taking some time off from the ring, Toney came back in 1999, seemingly focused on reclaiming his status as an elite fighter. He defeated former title holders and title contenders Adolpho Washington, Steve Little, Ramón Garbey, Saul Montana, Sione Asipeli, Courtney Butler, and Michael Rush. In August 2002, Toney beat Jason Robinson in an IBF Cruiserweight title elimination fight. This set up a fight between Toney and the champion, Vassiliy Jirov. After a postponement, the fight happened on April 26, 2003. Going into the 12th and final round, with the scores fairly even and the fight in the balance, Toney knocked the undefeated Jirov down in the 12th. The Kazakh rose from the canvas to go to the distance, but Toney got the judges verdict and was now a three-weight World Champion.

For Toney's performance he was awarded comeback of the year and named fighter of the year. The fight itself was named "Fight Of The Year" by The Ring magazine. Immediately afterward, Toney moved up to heavyweight, where he campaigned for the next 7 years.

=== Heavyweight ===
As far back as Toney's middleweight years, he insisted that he would one day be the heavyweight champion of the world. His October 4, 2003, victory over aging former heavyweight champion Evander Holyfield was Toney's entry into the heavyweight division. After a shaky first round, Toney picked apart Holyfield with shots to the body and head before stopping him in the 9th round. After the fight Toney declared he was "undestructable", that he "got milk baby" and didn't want any "bad ass questions" from announcer Jim Gray.

On September 23, 2004, Toney faced off with Rydell Booker. Although Toney injured his left arm, he was still able to defeat the clearly outmatched Booker, getting a 12-round unanimous decision for the fringe IBA heavyweight title.

On April 30, 2005, he defeated John Ruiz by a unanimous decision in a 12-round match for the World Boxing Association (WBA) heavyweight Championship. However, Toney failed his post-fight drug test, testing positive for the anabolic steroid stanozolol. This led to the New York Athletic Commission changing the bout's official outcome to a "no-contest", deducting the win from Toney's career record and banning him from boxing for 90 days. The WBA ordered that Ruiz be reinstated as its champion and that Toney be ineligible for another WBA Heavyweight title shot for two years. Toney defended himself by claiming that the steroids were given to him by a doctor to treat the arm injury he suffered during the Rydell Booker fight.

In his bout after the Ruiz fight, Toney won a unanimous decision victory over former heavyweight contender Dominic Guinn. Toney next fought against Hasim Rahman on March 18, 2006, for the WBC Heavyweight title. The result was a twelve-round majority draw.

Toney's next two outings were losses to Samuel Peter. The first fight was held in Los Angeles, California, on September 2, 2006. Toney lost by split decision. The return bout was held in Hollywood, Florida, on January 6, 2007, and Toney once again lost to Peter, this time by unanimous decision. Both fights were WBC eliminator bouts for the belt held by Oleg Maskaev.

Toney's next bout came on December 13, 2008, against Fres Oquendo. Oquendo was penalized one point in round eight for a rabbit punch, which would prove to be the deciding factor in the fight. Toney won a close, controversial split decision. On September 12, 2009, James fought heavyweight fighter Matthew Greer (12–5–0 11KO) at the Pechanga Resort & Casino. James won via TKO victory in round two.

On February 24, 2011, Toney made his return to boxing and won a ten-round unanimous decision against Damon Reed. All three judges scored the bout 100–90. For this bout Toney weighed in at a career high of 257 lbs.

=== Return to cruiserweight ===
After stepping back down to Cruiserweight, on November 4, 2011, Toney stepped into the ring at 199 lbs, the lowest he has been since 2003 against Russian star Denis Lebedev in Russia for the interim WBA World cruiserweight title. Toney was never competitive throughout the bout after encountering problems with his left knee during round two, and the judges all had it 120–108 for Lebedev. A week after the fight it was revealed Toney needed surgery to repair his knee.

=== Return to heavyweight ===
On April 7, 2012, Toney fought Bobby Gunn and won by a fifth round stoppage due to a hand injury sustained by Gunn. This was recognized as a world title by the International Boxing Union, a minor boxing organization.

Toney travelled to Australia in April 2013 to face Lucas Browne for the WBF heavyweight title. Toney lost the fight by wide unanimous decision. Seven months later on November 14, Toney travelled to London, England to compete in the heavyweight Prizefighter Series held at the famous York Hall venue. It was a special UK vs USA tournament with six fighters facing off in three round bouts. In the quarter-final, Toney faced English journeyman Matt Legg, and won by TKO in the third round, advancing to the semi-finals. In the semi-final, he faced fellow American Jason Gavern and lost by majority decision, and was eliminated from the tournament.

Toney's final bout came on May 13, 2017, at the age of 48. He defeated Mike Sheppard by sixth round stoppage; winning the WBF heavyweight title. After a career spanning 29 years and 92 professional bouts, Toney has confirmed he is officially retired.

== Exhibition bout ==
Toney made a comeback to the ring at age 55 on November 11, 2023, when he fought 59-year-old Donovan Ruddock, a former top ranked heavyweight contender, in Kingston, Jamaica. The fight went all six rounds and was scored a draw, with the first two rounds being a standard three minutes, while the later four were shortened to two minutes. Both men were criticized for their lousy athletic appearances and sluggish slow pace, as both were clearly showing their senior age. Nevertheless, the fight went the distance.

== Fighting style ==
Toney is well known for his "old school" or "throwback" crab style of boxing, which consisted of frequent head movement and shoulder rolls to avoid punches, as well as his ability to fight off the ropes using slick upper body movement and in-fighting. As such, he is said to have possessed a very high ring IQ. Although Toney was considered a defensive fighter by many, he still applied pressure to his opponents and usually forced his style against them; in some ways he could be considered a defensive pressure fighter. Because of his experience, defensive skills and extremely durable chin, he was never stopped in his 29-year professional career and was rarely knocked down.

== Mixed martial arts career ==
Toney was spotted in attendance at UFC 108 on January 2, 2010, which led to talks between him and UFC President Dana White regarding fighting in the organization. On March 3, it was confirmed by White that the two had agreed and signed a multi-fight deal with the company, at the age of 42.

To help his transition into MMA, Toney was coached by trainer Juanito Ibarra. Toney was later coached by Trevor Sherman.

=== Toney vs. Couture, UFC 118 ===
His debut fight was against UFC Hall of Famer and former UFC Heavyweight and Light Heavyweight champion Randy Couture at UFC 118 on August 28, 2010. Couture scored a takedown against Toney early in the first round, and went on to submit him with an arm-triangle choke. Toney was subsequently released from his contract with the UFC. The match achieved notoriety, though it drew criticisms of being a freak show fight, among them by UFC President Dana White himself. Toney's purse was around $500,000 opposed to Couture's $250,000.

=== Cancelled bout with Ken Shamrock ===
In the aftermath of his loss and release from the UFC, Toney stated he would "100 Percent" compete in MMA again, saying he would fight regardless if it was not in the UFC. He would later be attached to a mix rules venture bout against MMA pioneer and UFC veteran Ken Shamrock scheduled for November 2011. In October 2011, the event was cancelled and the bout never materialized beyond that. UFC 118 remains Toney's sole appearance in mixed martial arts.

== Professional boxing record ==
92 fights	77 wins	10 losses
By knockout	47	0
By decision	29	10
By disqualification	1	0
Draws	3	
No contests	2	

No.	Result	Record	Opponent	Type	Round, time	Date	Location	Notes
92	Win	77–10–3 (2)	Mike Sheppard	KO	6 (12) 0:26	May 13, 2017	Convocation Center, Ypsilanti, Michigan, U.S.	Won vacant WBF (Foundation) heavyweight title
91	Loss	76–10–3 (2)	Charles Ellis	UD	10	Aug 8, 2015	The Chase Park Plaza Hotel, St. Louis, Missouri, U.S.	
90	Loss	76–9–3 (2)	Jason Gavern	MD	3	Nov 14, 2013	York Hall, London, England	Prizefighter 32: heavyweight semi-final
89	Win	76–8–3 (2)	Matt Legg	TKO	3 (3), 1:04	Nov 14, 2013	York Hall, London, England	Prizefighter 32: heavyweight quarter-final
88	Win	75–8–3 (2)	Kenny Lemos	UD	8	Jun 28, 2013	Sky Ute Casino Resort, Ignacio, Colorado, U.S.	
87	Loss	74–8–3 (2)	Lucas Browne	UD	12	Apr 28, 2013	Convention and Exhibition Centre, Melbourne, Australia	For vacant WBF (Foundation) heavyweight title
86	Win	74–7–3 (2)	Bobby Gunn	RTD	5 (12), 3:00	Jul 4, 2012	Landers Center, Southaven, Mississippi, U.S.	Won vacant IBU heavyweight title
85	Loss	73–7–3 (2)	Denis Lebedev	UD	12	Nov 4, 2011	Khodynka Arena, Moscow, Russia	For WBA interim cruiserweight title
84	Win	73–6–3 (2)	Damon Reed	UD	10	Feb 24, 2011	San Manuel Indian Casino, Highland, California, U.S.	
83	Win	72–6–3 (2)	Matthew Greer	KO	2 (10), 2:33	Sep 12, 2009	Pechanga Resort & Casino, Temecula, California, U.S.	
82	Win	71–6–3 (2)	Fres Oquendo	SD	12	Dec 13, 2008	Morongo Casino Resort & Spa, Cabazon, California, U.S.	Won vacant NABO and IBA heavyweight titles
81	NC	70–6–3 (2)	Hasim Rahman	TKO	3 (12), 3:00	Jul 16, 2008	Pechanga Resort & Casino, Temecula, California, U.S.	Vacant NABO heavyweight title at stake; Originally TKO win for Toney, later ruled NC after an incorrect referee call
80	Win	70–6–3 (1)	Danny Batchelder	SD	10	May 24, 2007	HP Pavilion, San Jose, California, U.S.	
79	Loss	69–6–3 (1)	Samuel Peter	UD	12	Jan 6, 2007	Hard Rock Live, Hollywood, Florida, U.S.	For NABF heavyweight title
78	Loss	69–5–3 (1)	Samuel Peter	SD	12	Sep 2, 2006	Staples Center, Los Angeles, California, U.S.	Lost IBA heavyweight title; For NABF heavyweight title
77	Draw	69–4–3 (1)	Hasim Rahman	MD	12	Mar 18, 2006	Boardwalk Hall, Atlantic City, New Jersey, U.S.	For WBC heavyweight title
76	Win	69–4–2 (1)	Dominick Guinn	UD	12	Oct 1, 2005	Events Center, Reno, Nevada, U.S.	Retained IBA heavyweight title
75	NC	68–4–2 (1)	John Ruiz	UD	12	Apr 30, 2005	Madison Square Garden, New York City, New York, U.S.	WBA and IBA heavyweight titles at stake; Originally UD win for Toney, later ruled NC after he failed a drug test
74	Win	68–4–2	Rydell Booker	UD	12	Sep 23, 2004	Pechanga Resort & Casino, Temecula, California, U.S.	Won vacant WBC Continental Americas and IBA heavyweight titles
73	Win	67–4–2	Evander Holyfield	TKO	9 (12), 1:42	Oct 4, 2003	Mandalay Bay Events Center, Paradise, Nevada, U.S.	
72	Win	66–4–2	Vassiliy Jirov	UD	12	Apr 26, 2003	Foxwoods Resort Casino, Ledyard, Connecticut, U.S.	Won IBF cruiserweight title
71	Win	65–4–2	Jason Robinson	KO	7 (12), 2:47	Aug 18, 2002	Pechanga Resort & Casino, Temecula, California, U.S.	
70	Win	64–4–2	Michael Rush	TKO	10 (10), 2:10	May 31, 2002	Chinook Winds Casino, Lincoln City, Oregon, U.S.	
69	Win	63–4–2	Sione Asipeli	UD	10	Mar 22, 2002	Celebrity Theatre, Phoenix, Arizona, U.S.	
68	Win	62–4–2	Wesley Martin	TKO	3 (10), 1:08	Jul 30, 2001	Crystal Park Casino, Compton, California, U.S.	
67	Win	61–4–2	Saúl Montana	TKO	2 (12), 2:26	Mar 29, 2001	Cobo Hall, Detroit, Michigan, U.S.	Won vacant IBA super cruiserweight title
66	Win	60–4–2	Courtney Butler	TKO	3 (10), 1:14	Nov 3, 2000	Turning Stone Resort Casino, Verona, New York, U.S.	
65	Win	59–4–2	Terry McGroom	MD	10	Jan 21, 2000	Alumni Hall, Chicago, Illinois, U.S.	
64	Win	58–4–2	Ramón Garbey	UD	10	Oct 8, 1999	Roseland Ballroom, Taunton, Massachusetts, U.S.	
63	Win	57–4–2	Adolpho Washington	TKO	10 (10), 0:52	Jul 30, 1999	Foxwoods Resort Casino, Ledyard, Connecticut, U.S.	
62	Win	56–4–2	Terry Porter	TKO	8 (10), 2:09	Mar 7, 1999	Celebrity Theatre, Phoenix, Arizona, U.S.	
61	Win	55–4–2	Steve Little	UD	12	Jun 14, 1997	Grand Casino, Biloxi, Mississippi, U.S.	Won vacant IBO cruiserweight title
60	Loss	54–4–2	Drake Thadzi	MD	12	May 14, 1997	Foxwoods Resort Casino, Ledyard, Connecticut, U.S.	For vacant IBO light heavyweight title
59	Win	54–3–2	Mike McCallum	UD	12	Feb 22, 1997	Mohegan Sun Arena, Montville, Connecticut, U.S.	Won vacant WBU cruiserweight title
58	Loss	53–3–2	Montell Griffin	UD	12	Dec 6, 1996	Lawlor Events Center, Reno, Nevada, U.S.	Lost WBU light heavyweight title
57	Win	53–2–2	Duran Williams	TKO	9 (12), 2:06	Aug 9, 1996	Casino Magic, Bay St. Louis, Mississippi, U.S.	Retained WBU light heavyweight title
56	Win	52–2–2	Charles Oliver	UD	10	Jul 3, 1996	Station Casino, St. Charles, Missouri, U.S.	
55	Win	51–2–2	Earl Butler	TKO	4 (12), 0:46	May 14, 1996	Foxwoods Resort Casino, Ledyard, Connecticut, U.S.	Won WBU light heavyweight title
54	Win	50–2–2	Richard Mason	UD	10	Mar 1, 1996	Fantasy Springs Resort Casino, Indio, California, U.S.	
53	Win	49–2–2	Greg Everett	KO	2 (12), 2:03	Dec 8, 1995	Foxwoods Resort Casino, Ledyard, Connecticut, U.S.	Won WBU Continental cruiserweight title
52	Win	48–2–2	Ernest Mateen	DQ	5 (12), 2:59	Sep 9, 1995	Caesars Palace, Paradise, Nevada, U.S.	Retained WBU light heavyweight title; Mateen disqualified for repeated fouls
51	Win	47–2–2	Freddie Delgado	TKO	5 (12), 0:35	Jun 18, 1995	Mahalia Jackson Theater of the Performing Arts, New Orleans, Louisiana, U.S.	Won WBU light heavyweight title
50	Win	46–2–2	Anthony Hembrick	RTD	5 (12), 3:00	Apr 30, 1995	Rio All Suite Hotel and Casino, Paradise, Nevada, U.S.	Won USBA light heavyweight title
49	Win	45–2–2	Karl Willis	TKO	8 (10), 1:42	Mar 20, 1995	The Palace, Auburn Hills, Michigan, U.S.	
48	Loss	44–2–2	Montell Griffin	MD	12	Feb 18, 1995	MGM Grand Garden Arena, Paradise, Nevada, U.S.	For IBF Inter-Continental light heavyweight title
47	Loss	44–1–2	Roy Jones Jr.	UD	12	Nov 18, 1994	MGM Grand Garden Arena, Paradise, Nevada, U.S.	Lost IBF super middleweight title
46	Win	44–0–2	Charles Williams	KO	12 (12), 2:45	Jul 29, 1994	MGM Grand Garden Arena, Paradise, Nevada, U.S.	Retained IBF super middleweight title
45	Win	43–0–2	Vinson Durham	UD	10	May 18, 1994	Hyatt Regency O'Hare, Rosemont, Illinois, U.S.	
44	Win	42–0–2	Tim Littles	TKO	4 (12), 1:03	Mar 5, 1994	Grand Olympic Auditorium, Los Angeles, California, U.S.	Retained IBF super middleweight title
43	Win	41–0–2	Anthony Hembrick	TKO	7 (10), 0:47	Jan 16, 1994	Fernwood Resort, Bushkill, Pennsylvania, U.S.	
42	Win	40–0–2	Tony Thornton	UD	12	Oct 29, 1993	Civic Center, Tulsa, Oklahoma, U.S.	Retained IBF super middleweight title
41	Win	39–0–2	Larry Prather	UD	10	Aug 24, 1993	The Palace, Auburn Hills, Michigan, U.S.	
40	Win	38–0–2	Danny Garcia	RTD	6 (10), 3:00	Jul 29, 1993	Fernwood Resort, Bushkill, Pennsylvania, U.S.	
39	Win	37–0–2	Glenn Thomas	UD	10	Jun 6, 1993	The Aladdin, Paradise, Nevada, U.S.	
38	Win	36–0–2	Ricky Thomas	TKO	10 (10), 0:51	Apr 17, 1993	Fernwood Resort, Bushkill, Pennsylvania, U.S.	
37	Win	35–0–2	Govoner Chavers	TKO	9 (10), 1:54	Mar 23, 1993	The Palace, Auburn Hills, Michigan, U.S.	
36	Win	34–0–2	Iran Barkley	RTD	9 (12), 3:00	Feb 13, 1993	Caesars Palace, Paradise, Nevada, U.S.	Won IBF super middleweight title
35	Win	33–0–2	Doug DeWitt	RTD	6 (10), 3:00	Dec 5, 1992	Etess Arena, Atlantic City, New Jersey, U.S.	
34	Win	32–0–2	Mike McCallum	MD	12	Aug 29, 1992	Convention Center, Reno, Nevada, U.S.	Retained IBF middleweight title
33	Win	31–0–2	Ricky Stackhouse	TKO	3 (10)	May 26, 1992	The Palace, Auburn Hills, Michigan, U.S.	
32	Win	30–0–2	Glenn Wolfe	UD	12	Apr 11, 1992	Thomas & Mack Center, Paradise, Nevada, U.S.	Retained IBF middleweight title
31	Win	29–0–2	Dave Tiberi	SD	12	Feb 8, 1992	Etess Arena, Atlantic City, New Jersey, U.S.	Retained IBF middleweight title
30	Draw	28–0–2	Mike McCallum	SD	12	Dec 13, 1991	Convention Hall, Atlantic City, New Jersey, U.S.	Retained IBF middleweight title
29	Win	28–0–1	Francesco Dell'Aquila	TKO	4 (12), 0:43	Oct 12, 1991	Stade Louis II, Monte Carlo, Monaco	Retained IBF middleweight title
28	Win	27–0–1	Reggie Johnson	SD	12	Jun 29, 1991	Las Vegas Hilton, Winchester, Nevada, U.S.	Retained IBF middleweight title
27	Win	26–0–1	Michael Nunn	TKO	11 (12), 2:14	May 10, 1991	John O'Donnell Stadium, Davenport, Iowa, U.S.	Won IBF middleweight title
26	Win	25–0–1	Alberto Gonzalez	TKO	5 (10), 2:00	Mar 31, 1991	Sands Hotel and Casino, Paradise, Nevada, U.S.	
25	Win	24–0–1	Merqui Sosa	SD	12	Jan 13, 1991	Etess Arena, Atlantic City, New Jersey, U.S.	Retained IBC middleweight title
24	Win	23–0–1	Carlos Silva	TKO	5 (10), 1:29	Dec 10, 1990	Hyatt Regency, Dearborn, Michigan, U.S.	
23	Win	22–0–1	Sanderline Williams	UD	10	Oct 16, 1990	Hyatt Regency, Tampa, Florida, U.S.	
22	Win	21–0–1	Kevin Brazier	TKO	2 (10)	Aug 24, 1990	Hyatt Regency, Dearborn, Michigan, U.S.	
21	Draw	20–0–1	Sanderline Williams	MD	10	Jul 26, 1990	Dearborn, Michigan, U.S.	
20	Win	20–0	Ricardo Bryant	TKO	4 (12), 2:19	Jun 27, 1990	Hyatt Regency, Dearborn, Michigan, U.S.	Won IBC middleweight title
19	Win	19–0	Horacio Rene Brandan	KO	2 (10), 2:06	May 23, 1990	The Palace, Auburn Hills, Michigan, U.S.	
18	Win	18–0	Jose Luis Esteven	TKO	5 (10), 1:25	Apr 27, 1990	Atlantic City, New Jersey, U.S.	
17	Win	17–0	Toby Tyler	TKO	5 (6), 1:57	Apr 5, 1990	The Palace, Auburn Hills, Michigan, U.S.	
16	Win	16–0	Philip Morefield	KO	1 (10), 1:10	Mar 1, 1990	The Palace, Auburn Hills, Michigan, U.S.	Won vacant Michigan middleweight title
15	Win	15–0	Danny Thomas	UD	8	Jan 20, 1990	The Palace, Auburn Hills, Michigan, U.S.	
14	Win	14–0	Joe Johnson	TKO	4 1:45	Nov 29, 1989	The Palace, Auburn Hills, Michigan, U.S.	
13	Win	13–0	Ron Amundsen	UD	10	Nov 13, 1989	Central Park Athletic Club, Milwaukee, Wisconsin, U.S.	
12	Win	12–0	Robert Clinton	KO	1	Oct 26, 1989	International Hotel & Resorts, Atlantic City, New Jersey, U.S.	
11	Win	11–0	Ricardo Simpson	KO	2	Oct 12, 1989	The Palace, Auburn Hills, Michigan, U.S.	
10	Win	10–0	Joe Summers	TKO	2	Sep 21, 1989	Atlantic City, New Jersey, U.S.	
9	Win	9–0	Lemark Davis	UD	6	Sep 7, 1989	The Palace, Auburn Hills, Michigan, U.S.	
8	Win	8–0	Mark Stephens	TKO	2 (4)	Jul 20, 1989	Boat Club, Detroit, Michigan, U.S.	
7	Win	7–0	Steve Chaney	KO	1 (4)	Jun 6, 1989	Memphis, Tennessee, U.S.	
6	Win	6–0	Arthur Willis	SD	4	May 2, 1989	Memphis, Tennessee, U.S.	
5	Win	5–0	James Fernandez	UD	4	Feb 16, 1989	Premier Center, Sterling Heights, Michigan, U.S.	
4	Win	4–0	Sammy Jenkins	TKO	4 (4)	Jan 17, 1989	Premier Center, Sterling Heights, Michigan, U.S.	
3	Win	3–0	Carl Penn	KO	1 (4)	Jan 10, 1989	Memphis, Tennessee, U.S.	
2	Win	2–0	Ronnie Yoe	KO	1 (4)	Dec 6, 1988	The New Daisy Theatre, Memphis, Tennessee, U.S.	
1	Win	1–0	Stephen Lee	TKO	2 (4)	Oct 26, 1988	Thomas Crystal Gardens, Mount Clemens, Michigan, U.S.	

== Exhibition boxing record ==
1 fight	0 wins	0 losses
Draws	1	

No.	Result	Record	Opponent	Type	Round, time	Date	Location	Notes
1	Draw	0–0–1	Donovan Ruddock	PTS	6	Nov 11, 2023	National Indoor Sports Centre, Kingston, Jamaica	

== Mixed martial arts record ==
Professional record breakdown
1 match	0 wins	1 loss
By submission	0	1

Res.	Record	Opponent	Method	Event	Date	Round	Time	Location	Notes
Loss	0–1	Randy Couture	Submission (arm-triangle choke)	UFC 118	August 28, 2010	1	3:19	Boston, Massachusetts, United States	

== Titles in boxing ==
=== Major world titles ===
- IBF middleweight champion (160 lbs)
- IBF super middleweight champion (168 lbs)
- IBF cruiserweight champion (200 lbs)

=== Minor world titles ===
- IBC middleweight champion (160 lbs)
- WBU light heavyweight champion (175 lbs) (2×)
- WBU cruiserweight champion (200 lbs)
- IBO cruiserweight champion (200 lbs)
- IBA super cruiserweight champion (210 lbs)
- IBA heavyweight champion (200+ lbs) (2×)
- IBU heavyweight champion (200+ lbs)
- WBF (Foundation) heavyweight champion (200+ lbs)

=== Regional/International titles ===
- Michigan middleweight champion (160 lbs)
- USBA light heavyweight champion (175 lbs)
- WBU Continental cruiserweight champion (200 lbs)
- WBC Continental Americas heavyweight champion (200+ lbs)
- NABO heavyweight champion (200+ lbs)

== See also ==
- List of boxing triple champions
- List of middleweight boxing champions
- List of super middleweight boxing champions
- List of cruiserweight boxing champions
- List of IBF world champions

Sporting positions
Regional boxing titles
Vacant Title last held by Dwight Davison	Michigan middleweight champion March 1, 1990 – April 1990; Vacated	Vacant Title next held by Joe Stevenson
Vacant Title last held by Saúl Montana	WBC Continental Americas heavyweight champion September 23, 2004 – December 2004; Vacated	Vacant Title next held by Michael Moorer
Vacant Title last held by Derric Rossy	NABO heavyweight champion December 13, 2008 – August 2009; Vacated	Vacant Title next held by Brian Minto
Preceded by Anthony Hembrick	USBA light heavyweight champion April 30, 1995 – February 1997; Vacated	Vacant Title next held by William Guthrie
Minor world boxing titles
Inaugural champion	IBC middleweight champion June 27, 1990 – March 1991; Vacated	Vacant Title next held by Danny Garcia
Inaugural champion	WBU light heavyweight champion June 18, 1995 – December 6, 1996	Succeeded by Montell Griffin
Vacant Title last held by Thomas Hearns	WBU cruiserweight champion February 22, 1997 – May 1997; Vacated	Vacant Title next held by Don Diego Poeder
Vacant Title last held by Booker T Word	IBO cruiserweight champion June 14, 1997 – May 1998; Vacated	Vacant Title next held by Robert Daniels
Vacant Title last held by Lou Savarese	IBA heavyweight champion September 23, 2004 – September 2, 2006	Succeeded by Samuel Peter
Vacant Title last held by Samuel Peter	IBA heavyweight champion December 13, 2008 – November 2017; Vacated	Vacant
Vacant Title last held by Gene Pukall	IBU heavyweight champion April 7, 2012 – November 2017; Vacated	Vacant
Vacant Title last held by Peter Graham	WBF (Foundation) heavyweight champion May 13, 2017 – November 2017; Vacated	Vacant Title next held by Jesus Escalera
Major world boxing titles
Preceded by Michael Nunn	IBF middleweight champion May 10, 1991 – February 15, 1993; Vacated	Vacant Title next held by Roy Jones Jr.
Preceded by Iran Barkley	IBF super middleweight champion February 13, 1993 – November 18, 1994	Succeeded by Roy Jones Jr.
Preceded by Vassiliy Jirov	IBF cruiserweight champion April 26, 2003 – February 11, 2004; Vacated	Vacant Title next held by Kelvin Davis
Awards
Previous: Julio César Chávez	The Ring Fighter of the Year; 1991	Next: Riddick Bowe
Previous: Evander Holyfield	BWAA Fighter of the Year; 1991	Next: Riddick Bowe
Previous: Vernon Forrest	The Ring Fighter of the Year; 2003	Next: Glen Johnson
Previous: Vernon Forrest	BWAA Fighter of the Year; 2003	Next: Glen Johnson
Previous: Micky Ward vs. Arturo Gatti	The Ring Fight of the Year vs. Vassiliy Jirov; 2003	Next: Marco Antonio Barrera vs. Erik Morales III
Previous: Arturo Gatti	The Ring Comeback of the Year; 2003	Next: Marco Antonio Barrera
