= Lamont Pearson =

American professional boxer

Lamont Pearson (born February 18, 1971, in Washington, D.C.) is an American professional boxer. His professional record stands at 23-4-1 with 12 knockouts. Each of his four losses have come to current or former world champions.

== Amateur career ==
Pearson had a 67–8 record, including winning a 1998 National Golden Gloves Lightweight Championship.

== Professional career ==
Pearson turned professional in 1998 aged 27. After four wins he was held to a draw in 1999 when he fought Philadelphia lightweight Anthony Washington in a six-round bout on an ESPN2 Friday Night Fights, but received praise from ESPN boxing analyst Teddy Atlas, who scored the fight for Pearson 57-56. After the draw with Washington, Pearson began to climb the Super Featherweight (Junior Lightweight) ranks (130 lbs/59 kg), with 11 consecutive wins. His first regional title bout was on December 8, 2000, and was also his first bout against a well-known fighter, challenging southpaw Harold Warren, a 40-year-old former two-time world title challenger with a record of 42–14, for the vacant North American Boxing Association (NABA) Super Featherweight Title. In the 12th and final round, Pearson won with a knockout, with an uppercut to Warren's jaw that put him on the canvas, where he was counted out at 2:51 of round twelve, winning Pearson his first title. The fight was the last of Warren's 57-fight professional career.

In 2001 in an IBF Super Featherweight Title Eliminator, Pearson faced another southpaw, Carlos Navarro of Los Angeles, with a record of 23–1. Pearson defeated Navarro in the ninth round, when Navarro conceded after hitting the canvas for the second time. With the win, Pearson claimed the United States Boxing Association (USBA) Super Featherweight Title and a #1 IBF-ranking.

Pearson defended the USBA title once before suffering an unexpected defeat in a non-title 10-round bout against last minute replacement Orlando Salido (record 14-8). Salido won many of the early rounds before Pearson bounced back later on, but ended with a unanimous decision loss.

After two more wins Pearson reached a world title fight in December 2002, with his record at 19-1-1, challenging reigning World Boxing Association (WBA) champion Yodsanan Sor Nanthachai in Bangkok, Thailand, for the WBA Super Featherweight title. The bout took place on King Bhumibol's birthday, a national holiday in Thailand, at the Royal Square in front of an audience of 75,000. Pearson suffered a broken right hand in the second round from an awkwardly landing punch, and Pearson had limited use of the hand for the remaining rounds. He had his first professional knockdown in the ninth round, and the fight ended with his first knockout loss when he was floored and counted out at 1:46 of round nine from a body shot.

Eight months later, in August 2003, Pearson contested the USBA Super Featherweight title again, against Australian Robbie Peden. Early in the fight, Pearson began showing discomfort in his surgically repaired right hand, and was forced to retire before the seventh round. He subsequently took a 17-month break for additional surgery on his hand.

In September 2005, Pearson challenged for the USBA Super Featherweight title again at the Patriot Center in Fairfax, Virginia, against Brooklyn southpaw Shamir Reyes (record 18–3–2). Pearson won with a bodyshot in the sixth.

In July 2006, Pearson fought another southpaw, former World Boxing Association (WBA) Super Featherweight titleholder Joel Casamayor, on an ESPN2's Friday Night Fights broadcast from Phoenix, Arizona. The 10-round bout was Pearson's first significant fight as a lightweight. Casamayor dominated for many of the first eight rounds before the bout was stopped due to a cut around Pearson's right eye in the 9th round.

== Personal life ==
Pearson currently lives in Cheltenham, Maryland.
