= Juanito Ibarra =

American boxer

Juanito Ibarra is a boxing and mixed martial arts trainer, predominantly known for his work with champions in boxing such as Oscar De La Hoya and in MMA such as Quinton "Rampage" Jackson. Ibarra and Jackson parted ways after his loss at UFC 86.

Ibarra was ranked #469 on the "Boxings 500 best trainers" list. Ibarra trained pro boxer James Toney to fight in MMA.
