= Yodsanan Sor Nanthachai =

Thai boxer (born 1974)

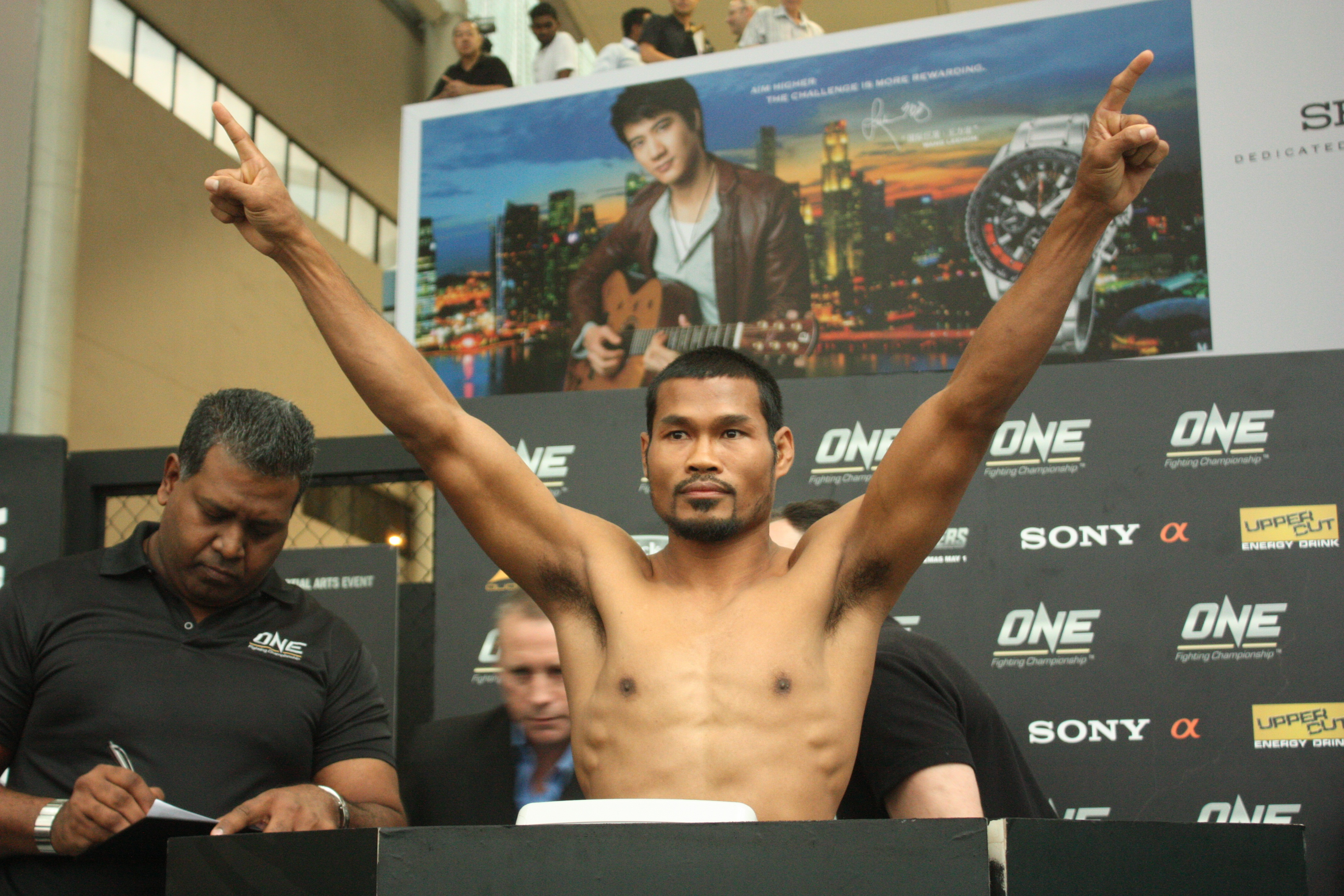
- Born: Theera Phongwan (ธีระ พงษ์วัน); August 17, 1974 (age 52); Phrai Bueng District, Srisaket Province, Thailand
- Native name: ยอดสนั่น ส.นันทชัย
- Other names: Little Mike Tyson, Thai Mike Tyson, Demon Shadow
- Nationality: Thailand
- Height: 1.68 m (5 ft 6 in)
- Weight: 61 kg (134 lb; 9.6 st)
- Division: Super featherweight (Boxing); Flyweight (MMA); Bantamweight (MMA)
- Style: Boxing, Muay Thai
- Stance: Southpaw
- Fighting out of: Suphan Buri, Thailand
- Team: Onesongchai Promotions (Boxing); Evolve MMA (MMA)
- Trainer: Yodtong Senanan (Muay Thai); Ismael Salas (Boxing)
- Years active: 1993–2009 (Boxing); 2011–2017 (MMA)

Professional boxing record
- Total: 60
- Wins: 56
- By knockout: 45
- Losses: 3
- By knockout: 2
- Draws: 1

Mixed martial arts record
- Total: 5
- Wins: 4
- By knockout: 3
- By submission: 1
- Losses: 1
- By submission: 1

Other information
- Boxing record from BoxRec
- Mixed martial arts record from Sherdog

Yodsanan Sor Nanthachai or Yodsanan Sityodtong a.k.a. Yodsanan 3-K Battery (Thai: ยอดสนั่น 3เคแบตเตอรี่; born name Theera Phongwan new name Theepaphat Phongwankittikun August 17, 1974 in Phrai Bueng District, Srisaket Province, Thailand) is a Thai professional Muay Thai fighter, professional boxer, and mixed martial artist. Yodsanan is a former WBA super featherweight champion, a title he held from 2002 to 2005.

In MMA, he competed for ONE Championship in their Bantamweight division from 2011 to 2017. Yodsanan fights out of Evolve MMA in Singapore, where he is a member of the Evolve Fight Team.

He is known as the Thai Tyson due to his KO power, having won 45 of 56 fights by knockout, and is one of the best boxers Thailand has ever produced.

== Boxing ==
Yodsanan turned pro in 1993 and won his first five fights by KO. In 1997 he defeated Run Tangkilisan to win the interim PABA Super Featherweight Title. He defended the title 20 times before vacating it in order to challenge for the WBA Super Featherweight title which he won by defeating Lakva Sim on 13 April 2002.

Yodsanan successfully defended the title three times defeating Lamont Pearson, Ryuhei Suguta and Steve Forbes. On 30 April 2005 he faced challenger Vicente Mosquera at Madison Square Garden. Yodsanan became the first man to ever knock Mosquera down but still lost the fight by unanimous decision.

On 2 February 2009, Yodsanan defeated Jonathan Simamora by third-round knockout to win the vacant IBF Australasian Light Welterweight title.

== Muay Thai ==
Yodsanan has fought several professional Muay Thai fights. Notably on 8 March 2007 when he fought Bovy Sor Udomson at Rajadamnern Stadium losing by decision.

== Mixed martial arts ==
In early 2011 it emerged that Yodsanan had started training in mixed martial arts at Evolve MMA in Singapore. On July 15, 2011, it was announced that Yodsanan had signed with ONE Fighting Championship. This has led some journalists to suggest that Yodsanan will be the best boxer to ever switch from boxing to MMA.

Yodsanan made his professional debut when he fought South African Muay Thai champion Daniel Mashamaite at ONE Fighting Championship: Champion vs. Champion at the Singapore Indoor Stadium on September 3, 2011. He won the fight via TKO in the second round after landing a stunning flying knee to the face of his opponent. On March 31, 2012, Yodsanan faced Jiang Long Yun at ONE Fighting Championship: War of the Lions in his second MMA appearance, where he lost via first-round submission.

He would take a hiatus from mixed martial arts before returning four years later on May 27, 2016, to defeat Khon Sichan at ONE Championship: Kingdom of Champions. On March 11, 2017, Yodsanan faced Ramon Gonzalez at ONE Championship: Warrior Kingdom, which saw him score a comeback victory via verbal submission. On December 9, 2017, he defeated Dodi Mardian by first-round, one-punch knockout at ONE Championship: Warriors of the World.

== Professional boxing record ==
60 fights	56 wins	3 losses
By knockout	45	2
By decision	11	1
Draws	1	

No.	Result	Record	Opponent	Type	Round, time	Date	Location	Notes
60	Win	56–3–1	Jonatan Simamora	KO	3 (12)	2009-02-12	Southern Association of Thailand, Bangkok, Thailand	Won IBF Australasian junior welterweight title
59	Win	55–3–1	Sayedali Mousavi	KO	4 (6)	2008-12-19	Ko Pha-ngan, Thailand	
58	Win	54–3–1	Jimrex Jaca	TKO	6 (10)	2008-06-27	Pattaya, Thailand	
57	Win	53–3–1	Dennapa Bigshotcamp	KO	5 (10)	2008-03-28	Wat Bueng Thonglang, Bangkok, Thailand	
56	Win	52–3–1	Mars Jubanishev	TKO	3 (10)	2008-01-25	Saraburi, Thailand	
55	Win	51–3–1	Mitsuru Okubo	TKO	4 (10)	2007-12-04	Bueng Boraphet, Thailand	
54	Win	50–3–1	Xu Zhong Yong	KO	1 (6)	2007-09-21	Pattaya, Thailand	
53	Win	49–3–1	Omid Gholizadeh	TKO	2 (8)	2006-12-05	Royal Square, Bangkok, Thailand	
52	Win	48–3–1	Sataporn Singwancha	TKO	4 (10)	2006-10-31	Chaiyaphum, Thailand	
51	Win	47–3–1	Arnel Tinampay	UD	8 (8)	2006-05-19	Siam Shanghai Shopping Mall, Nonthaburi, Thailand	
50	Win	46–3–1	Fernando Montilla	TKO	2 (10)	2006-03-24	Sisaket, Thailand	
49	Win	45–3–1	Bart Abapo	UD	6 (6)	2005-12-05	Royal Square, Bangkok, Thailand	
48	Win	44–3–1	Teofilo Tunacao	UD	6 (6)	2005-11-17	Chai Nat, Thailand	
47	Loss	43–3–1	Vicente Mosquera	UD	12 (12)	2005-04-30	Madison Square Garden, New York City, New York, U.S.	Lost WBA super featherweight title
46	Win	43–2–1	Steve Forbes	UD	12 (12)	2004-08-07	Foxwoods Resort Casino, Mashantucket, Connecticut, U.S.	Retained WBA super featherweight title
45	Win	42–2–1	Ryuhei Sugita	TKO	7 (12)	2004-02-08	Memorial Center, Gifu, Japan	Retained WBA (Regular) super featherweight title
44	Win	41–2–1	Farid Debourt	KO	6 (10)	2003-12-05	Royal Square, Bangkok, Thailand	
43	Win	40–2–1	Larry Pelonia	TKO	2 (10)	2003-08-15	The Mall Shopping Center, Bangkok, Thailand	
42	Win	39–2–1	Tirso Albia	KO	2 (10)	2003-01-29	Uttaradit, Thailand	
41	Win	38–2–1	Lamont Pearson	KO	9 (12)	2002-12-05	Royal Square, Bangkok, Thailand	Retained WBA (Regular) super featherweight title
40	Win	37–2–1	Lakva Sim	UD	12 (12)	2002-04-13	Provincial Hall, Nakhon Ratchasima, Thailand	Won vacant WBA (Regular) super featherweight title
39	Win	36–2–1	Boubaker	KO	1 (12)	2002-02-21	Wat Temple Banrai, Dan Khun Thot, Thailand	
38	Win	35–2–1	Walter Hugo Rodriguez	TKO	4 (12)	2001-12-05	Bangkok, Thailand	Retained PABA super featherweight title
37	Win	34–2–1	Jesus Zatarin	TKO	9 (12)	2001-11-09	Nonthaburi, Thailand	Retained PABA super featherweight title
36	Win	33–2–1	Fernando Montilla	KO	4 (12)	2001-09-08	Bangkok, Thailand	Retained PABA super featherweight title
35	Win	32–2–1	Gustavo Fabian Cuello	KO	1 (12)	2001-04-27	Hua Hin, Thailand	Retained PABA super featherweight title
34	Win	31–2–1	Joselito Rivera	TKO	3 (12)	2001-01-02	Rayong, Thailand	Retained PABA super featherweight title
33	Win	30–2–1	Theodor Luanda	KO	2 (12)	2000-12-10	Lopburi, Thailand	Retained PABA super featherweight title
32	Win	29–2–1	Rolando Pritos	KO	3 (12)	2000-10-08	Phon Thong, Thailand	Retained PABA super featherweight title
31	Win	28–2–1	Allan Visayas	KO	4 (12)	2000–08-19	Sukhothai, Thailand	Retained PABA super featherweight title
30	Win	27–2–1	Rex Marzan	TKO	2 (12)	2000-07-15	Bangkok, Thailand	Retained PABA super featherweight title
29	Win	26–2–1	Jose Luis Tula	KO	6 (12)	2000-05-12	Mukdahan, Thailand	Retained PABA super featherweight title
28	Win	25–2–1	WonBo Jun	KO	2 (12)	2000-04-02	Bangkok, Thailand	Retained PABA super featherweight title
27	Win	24–2–1	Kanat Sikhimbayev	KO	4 (12)	2000-02-20	Lopburi, Thailand	Retained PABA super featherweight title
26	Win	23–2–1	Kanat Sikhimbayev	TD	5 (12)	1999-11-28	Pattaya, Thailand	Retained PABA super featherweight title
25	Win	22–2–1	Richard Pittman	KO	1 (12)	1999-09-26	Bangkok, Thailand	Retained PABA super featherweight title
24	Draw	21–2–1	Sukhbayar Nemekbayar	PTS	12 (12)	1999-06-20	Bangkok, Thailand	Retained PABA super featherweight title
23	Win	21–2	Quinton Donahue	KO	1 (12)	1999-02-20	Chaweng Beach Arena, Koh Samui, Thailand	Retained PABA super featherweight title
22	Win	20–2	Jeffrey Onate	KO	2 (12)	1998-10-17	Central Plaza Hotel, Bangkok, Thailand	Retained PABA super featherweight title
21	Win	19–2	Abdullah Karim	KO	1 (12)	1998–07–31	Satun, Thailand	Retained PABA super featherweight title
20	Win	18–2	Sukhbayar Nemekbayar	SD	12 (12)	1998-04-16	Hua Hin, Thailand	Won PABA super featherweight title
19	Win	17–2	Run Tangkilisan	KO	2 (12)	1997-06-29	Main Stadium, Ratchaburi, Thailand	Won PABA interim super featherweight title
18	Win	16–2	Robby Rahangmetang	KO	4 (10)	1997-02-16	Chachoengsao Stadium, Chachoengsao, Thailand	
17	Win	15–2	Allan Visayas	KO	1 (10)	1996-11-24	Provincial Stadium, Ubon Ratchathani, Thailand	
16	Win	14–2	Ricky Gayamo	KO	2 (6)	1996-10-27	Laplae, Thailand	
15	Win	13–2	Gilberto Murillo	KO	2 (6)	1996-09-08	Provincial Soccer Stadium, Nakhon Pathom, Thailand	
14	Win	12–2	Joeboy Sitnaiodd	TKO	2 (6)	1996-04-07	Uttaradit, Thailand	
13	Win	11–2	Samranthong Tor Chalermchai	PTS	6 (6)	1995-09-17	Bangkok, Thailand	
12	Win	10–2	Padetsuk Monsaichon	KO	1 (6)	1995-08-25	Bangkok, Thailand	
11	Win	9–2	Watanachai Sor Weerakul	PTS	6 (6)	1995-06-09	Bangkok, Thailand	
10	Loss	8–2	Sangatit Wor Suteera	KO	1 (6)	1994-09-27	Bangkok, Thailand	
9	Win	8–1	Anandej Kiatprasanchai	PTS	6 (6)	1994-08-26	Bangkok, Thailand	
8	Win	7–1	Singsamai Sitnongbird	KO	3 (6)	1994-06-17	Bangkok, Thailand	
7	Win	6–1	Tampetch Sor Sakulpan	PTS	6 (6)	1994-05-03	Bangkok, Thailand	
6	Loss	5–1	Dej Por Pao In	KO	6 (6)	1994-03-04	Bangkok, Thailand	
5	Win	5–0	Jakpichit Napattaya	KO	2 (6)	1994-02-15	Bangkok, Thailand	
4	Win	4–0	Kongkiat Por Surasak	KO	3 (6)	1994-01-28	Bangkok, Thailand	
3	Win	3–0	Petchtongchai Por Apichart	KO	2 (6)	1994-01-04	Bangkok, Thailand	
2	Win	2–0	Chumpae Chor Chuykul	KO	2 (6)	1993-12-11	Bangkok, Thailand	
1	Win	1–0	Dentungsong Saksamut	KO	2 (6)	1993-11-06	Bangkok, Thailand	

== Mixed martial arts record ==
Professional record breakdown
5 matches	4 wins	1 loss
By knockout	4	0
By submission	0	1

Res.	Record	Opponent	Method	Event	Date	Round	Time	Location	Notes
Win	4–1	Dodi Mardian	KO (punches)	ONE: Warriors of the World	December 9, 2017	1	1:32	Bangkok, Thailand	
Win	3–1	Ramon Gonzalez	TKO (retirement)	ONE: Warrior Kingdom	March 11, 2017	2	3:21	Bangkok, Thailand	
Win	2–1	Khon Sichan	TKO (punches)	ONE: Kingdom of Champions	May 27, 2016	1	3:44	Bangkok, Thailand	
Loss	1–1	Yuan Jiang Long	Submission (rear-naked choke)	ONE FC: War of the Lions	March 31, 2012	1	4:28	Kallang, Singapore	
Win	1–0	Daniel Mashamaite	TKO (knee)	ONE FC: Champion vs. Champion	September 3, 2011	2	0:14	Kallang, Singapore	

== Muay Thai record ==
Kickboxing record
Date	Result	Opponent	Event	Location	Method	Round	Time
2007-03-08	Loss	(Thailand) Bovy Sor Udomson	Wansongchai Fights, Rajadamnern Stadium	Bangkok, Thailand	Decision	5	3:00
Legend: Win Loss Draw/No contest Notes

== Personal life ==
In 2009, he was a boxing trainer for Evolve MMA in Singapore.

In November 2010, he received an honorary master's degree in sports science from Sisaket Rajabhat University.

He has a son, Chaiyapong "Jackie Little Yodsanan" Phongwankittikun, who also became a boxer and won the ABF Continental super-featherweight title by knocking out fellow Thai boxer Arnon Yupang in the seventh round on June 10, 2026.

== See also ==
- List of southpaw stance boxers
- List of world super-featherweight boxing champions

Sporting positions
Regional boxing titles
New title	PABA super-featherweight champion Interim title June 29, 1997 – November 28, 1999; Won full title	Vacant Title next held by Joey De Ricardo
Preceded by Kanat Sikhimbayev	PABA super-featherweight champion November 28, 1999 – April 13, 2002; Won world title	Vacant Title next held by Pongsith Wiangwiset
Vacant Title last held by Lance Gostelow	IBF Australasian light-welterweight champion February 12, 2009 – 2010; Vacated	Vacant Title next held by Chad Bennett
World boxing titles
New title	WBA (Regular) super-featherweight champion April 13, 2002 – February 10, 2004; Promoted	Vacant Title next held by Javier Fortuna
Vacant Title last held by Acelino Freitas as Unified champion	WBA super-featherweight champion February 10, 2004 – April 30, 2005	Succeeded by Vicente Mosquera
