= Vicente Mosquera =

Panamanian boxer (born 1979)

Personal information
- Nickname: El Loco
- Born: Vicente Eduardo Mosquera Mena; December 9, 1979 (age 46) Panama City, Panama
- Height: 5 ft 8 in (173 cm)
- Weight: Super featherweight

Boxing career
- Stance: Orthodox

Boxing record
- Total fights: 37
- Wins: 33
- Win by KO: 18
- Losses: 3
- Draws: 1

Vicente Eduardo Mosquera Mena (born December 9, 1979, in Panama City, Panama) is a Panamanian professional boxer. He is a former World Boxing Association (WBA) super-featherweight champion.

== Professional career ==
On April 30, 2005, he defeated Yodsanan Sor Nanthachai (also known as "Yodsanan 3-K Battery") for the WBA world championship title, by a unanimous decision. The official scorers saw it 118–108, 116–111, 115–112. In the fight, Nanthachai was knocked down three times (in the first, third, and eleventh rounds). Mosquera also was knocked down in the third round.

On August 5, 2006, Mosquera lost his belt to Edwin Valero by TKO in the 10th round.

One of his trainers was María Toto.

== Professional boxing record ==
37 fights	33 wins	3 losses
By knockout	18	1
By decision	13	2
By disqualification	2	0
Draws	1	

No.	Result	Record	Opponent	Type	Round, time	Date	Location	Notes
37	Loss	33–3–1	Javier Prieto	UD	12 (12)	2013-11-30	Arena Panama Al Brown, Colón, Panama	For vacant WBC Silver lightweight title
36	Win	33–2–1	Cosme Rivera	RTD	7 (10)	2013-06-28	Civic Center, Kissimmee, Florida, U.S.	
35	Win	32–2–1	Francisco Contreras Lopez	DQ	6 (10)	2013-01-24	Hotel RIU, Panama City, Panama	
34	Win	31–2–1	Daniel Attah	RTD	5 (10)	2012-10-19	Civic Center, Kissimmee, Florida, U.S.	
33	Win	30–2–1	Walter Castillo	SD	10 (10)	2012-02-09	Gimnasio Nuevo Panama, Panama City, Panama	Won vacant WBC Latino light-welterweight title
32	Win	29–2–1	Gutemberg Ferreira	TKO	3 (8)	2011-12-01	Fantastic Casino de Albrook Mall, Panama City, Panama	
31	Win	28–2–1	Loel Barrantes	TKO	5 (8)	2011-09-08	Gimnasio Nuevo Panama, Panama City, Panama	
30	Win	27–2–1	Jose Miranda	UD	8 (8)	2011-06-17	Gimnasio Nuevo Panama, Panama City, Panama	
29	Win	26–2–1	Gilbert Quiros	KO	3 (8)	2011-04-02	Gimnasio Nuevo Panama, Panama City, Panama	
28	Win	25–2–1	Segundo Herrera	TKO	6 (6)	2011-02-10	Atlapa Convention Centre, Panama City, Panama	
27	Loss	24–2–1	Edwin Valero	TKO	10 (12)	2006-08-05	Figali Convention Center, Fort Amador, Panama	Lost WBA super-feather title
26	Win	24–1–1	Jose Pablo Estrella	SD	12 (12)	2006-05-12	Orfeo Superdomo, Córdoba, Argentina	Retained WBA super-feather title
25	Win	23–1–1	Carlos Saenz	TKO	6 (10)	2006-02-04	Figali Convention Center, Fort Amador, Panama	
24	Win	22–1–1	Walter Estrada	TKO	8 (10)	2005-12-10	Figali Convention Center, Fort Amador, Panama	
23	Win	21–1–1	Yodsanan Sor Nanthachai	UD	12 (12)	2005-04-30	Madison Square Garden, New York City, New York, U.S.	Won WBA super-feather title
22	Win	20–1–1	Esteban de Jesus Morales	DQ	9 (12)	2004-12-03	Figali Convention Center, Fort Amador, Panama	Retained WBA Fedelatin super-feather title
21	Win	19–1–1	Edixon Garcia	TKO	8 (12)	2004-10-01	Figali Convention Center, Fort Amador, Panama	Retained WBA Fedelatin super-feather title
20	Win	18–1–1	Victor Julio Salgado	TKO	3 (8)	2004-08-28	Jardín Nuevas Glorias Soberanas, Juan Díaz, Panama	
19	Win	17–1–1	Edgar Ilarraza	UD	12 (12)	2004-05-25	Atlapa Convention Centre, Panama City, Panama	Won vacant WBA Fedelatin super-feather title
18	Win	16–1–1	Ali Oubaali	UD	10 (10)	2004-01-31	El Poliedro, Caracas, Venezuela	
17	Win	15–1–1	Octavio Narvaez	TKO	7 (12)	2003-11-26	Atlapa Convention Centre, Panama City, Panama	Retained WBA Fedecentro super-feather title
16	Win	14–1–1	Roinet Caballero	TKO	6 (12)	2003-10-03	Gimnasio Nuevo Panama, Panama City, Panama	Retained WBA Fedecentro super-feather title
15	Win	13–1–1	Victor Baquedano	TKO	5 (12)	2003-06-28	Gimnasio Nuevo Panama, Panama City, Panama	Won vacant WBA Fedecentro super-feather title
14	Win	12–1–1	Jefferson Auraad Rodriguez	UD	8 (8)	2003-02-15	Gimnasio Nuevo Panama, Panama City, Panama	
13	Loss	11–1–1	Armando Cordoba	SD	12 (12)	2000-04-28	Hotel El Panama, Panama City, Panama	For Panamanian super-bantamweight title
12	Win	11–0–1	Marcos Sanchez	KO	1 (10)	2000-03-25	Hotel El Panama, Panama City, Panama	
11	Draw	10–0–1	Armando Cordoba	MD	12 (12)	2000-01-28	Hotel El Panama, Panama City, Panama	For Panamanian super-bantamweight title
10	Win	10–0	Danilo Arciria	TKO	4 (10)	1999-11-26	Salón Magnum Eventus, Panama City, Panama	
9	Win	9–0	Victor Perez	UD	6 (6)	1999-10-01	Arena Panama Al Brown, Colón, Panama	
8	Win	8–0	Jorge Fernandez	KO	3 (6)	1999-07-31	Arena Panama Al Brown, Colón, Panama	
7	Win	7–0	Virgilio Alvarez	TKO	3 (4)	1998-12-05	Gimnasio de Curundu, Panama City, Panama	
6	Win	6–0	Winston Sierra	UD	6 (6)	1998-09-18	Gimnasio Nuevo Panama, Panama City, Panama	
5	Win	5–0	Arquimedes Gonzalez	UD	4 (4)	1998-07-31	Gimnasio La Higuera, Chepo, Panama	
4	Win	4–0	Carlos Eliecer Jaramillo	UD	4 (4)	1998-07-18	Gimnasio Yuyin Luzcando, Betania, Panama	
3	Win	3–0	Johnny Villareal	TKO	3 (4)	1998-04-18	Gimnasio Kiwanis, Panama City, Panama	
2	Win	2–0	Garibaldo Morris	UD	4 (4)	1998-03-28	Gimnasio Kiwanis, Panama City, Panama	
1	Win	1–0	Virgilio Alvarez	UD	4 (4)	1998-02-14	Gimnasio Kiwanis, Panama City, Panama	

== Legal troubles ==
Several days after the Valero fight, Mosquera was involved in an unclear altercation that resulted in the death of a person. He remained incarcerated for three and a half years before being found innocent in trial.

== See also ==
- List of world super-featherweight boxing champions

Sporting positions
Regional boxing titles
Vacant Title last held by Daniel Jiménez	WBA Fedecentro super-featherweight champion June 28, 2003 – 2004; Vacated	Vacant Title next held by Aldo Valtierra
Vacant Title last held by Antonio Cermeño	WBA Fedelatin super-featherweight champion May 25, 2004 – 2005; Vacated	Vacant Title next held by Whyber Garcia
Vacant Title last held by Cosme Rivera	WBC Latino light-welterweight champion February 9, 2012 – 2012; Vacated	Vacant Title next held by Victor Cayo
World boxing titles
Preceded by Yodsanan Sor Nanthachai	WBA super-featherweight champion April 30, 2005 – August 5, 2006	Succeeded by Edwin Valero
