= Michael Nunn vs. James Toney =

Boxing match

Rumble on the Riverbank
- Date: May 10, 1991
- Venue: John O'Donnell Stadium, Davenport, Iowa, U.S.
- Title(s) on the line: IBF middleweight title

Tale of the tape
| Boxer | Michael Nunn | James Toney |
| Nickname | Second to (Nunn) | Lights Out |
| Hometown | Davenport, Iowa, U.S. | Grand Rapids, Michigan, U.S. |
| Purse | $500,000 | $65,000 |
| Pre-fight record | 36–0 (24 KO) | 25–0–1 (18 KO) |
| Age | 28 years | 22 years, 8 months |
| Height | 6 ft 2 in (188 cm) | 5 ft 9 in (175 cm) |
| Weight | 160 lb (73 kg) | 157 lb (71 kg) |
| Style | Southpaw | Orthodox |
| Recognition | IBF; Middleweight Champion; The Ring; No. 1 Ranked Middleweight; The Ring No. 3 ranked pound-for-pound fighter | IBF; No. 5 Ranked Middleweight; The Ring; No. 7 Ranked Middleweight |

Result
- Toney wins via 11th-round TKO

Michael Nunn vs. James Toney, billed as Rumble on the Riverbank, was a professional boxing match contested on May 10, 1991, for the IBF middleweight title.

== Background ==
In the midst of a near three-year reign as the IBF middleweight champion, Michael Nunn, with help from his promoter Bob Arum, successfully lobbied for and received a chance to defend his title in his hometown of Davenport, Iowa. Arum had originally declined Nunn's proposal for a hometown fight, but eventually relented when riverboat casino tycoon John E. Connelly, owner of the Davenport, Iowa-based The President riverboat casino, offered to underwrite the fight. When the fight was officially announced, Connelly bought $100,000 worth of tickets as well.

With Nunn in need of an opponent, Arum contacted the then-little-known and undefeated James Toney, the IBF's fifth ranked middleweight contender, and offered him the opportunity to face Nunn, promising him a career-high $45,000 purse and a three-fight contract worth $1,000,000 should he defeat Nunn, which Toney accepted. As Toney had only faced marginal competition up that point, he was installed as a massive 20–1 underdog by oddsmakers. Nunn admitted at the pre-fight press conference that bringing a title fight to his native city "meant the world" to him.

Nunn's team originally eyed Carver–Hawkeye Arena, home to the University of Iowa's basketball teams, as the site for the bout, but the school rejected the offer. Instead, minor league baseball team Quad Cities River Bandits' home ballpark John O'Donnell Stadium was chosen as it was determined to be the only venue big enough to accommodate the fight. The Nunn–Barkley was first world title fight to be held in Iowa in over 90 years, with the Jimmy Barry–Casper Leon fight for the world bantamweight title in 1898 being the last.

== The fight ==
For a large majority of the fight, Nunn thoroughly outboxed Toney, using his jab and elusiveness to keep the pursuing Toney off-balance and countering Toney's punches with rapid combinations of his own, and had built up a sizable lead on the all three scorecards. However, midway through the eleventh, Toney landed a straight right hand that sent the retreating Nunn forcefully into the ropes. A stunned Nunn attempted to trade punches with Toney in the middle of the ring, but was caught with another right hand followed by a huge left hook that immediately sent Nunn down on his back. Nunn barely answered the referee's 10-count, getting back up at the count of nine. After confirming with referee Dennis Nelson that he wanted to continue, Nunn was quickly sent staggering into the ropes after which Toney landed consecutive right hands that sent Nunn down to his knees. After the knockdown, Nelson stopped the fight just as Nunn's trainer Angelo Dundee threw in the white towel to signify surrender.

== Aftermath ==
After the loss, Nunn moved up a weight division to super middleweight.

== Fight card ==
Confirmed bouts:

| Weight Class | Weight | | vs. | | Method | Round | Notes |
|---|---|---|---|---|---|---|---|
| Middleweight | 160 lbs. | James Toney | def | Michael Nunn (c) | TKO | 11/12 | ^{Note 1} |
| Light Flyweight | 108 lbs. | Michael Carbajal (c) | def | Héctor Patri | UD | 12/12 | ^{Note 2} |
| Super Lightweight | 140 lbs. | Vince Phillips | def. | David Taylor | UD | 10/10 |
| Cruiserweight | 190 lbs. | Frank Lux | def. | Lon Liebergen | TKO | 7/10 |

^Note 1 For IBF middleweight title
^Note 2 For IBF light flyweight title

== Broadcasting ==
| Country | Broadcaster |
|---|---|
| United Kingdom | Sky Sports |
| United States | HBO |

| Preceded by vs. Donald Curry | Michael Nunn's bouts 10 May 1991 | Succeeded by vs. Randall Yonker |
| Preceded by vs. Alberto Gonzalez | James Toney's bouts 10 May 1991 | Succeeded by vs. Reggie Johnson |
Awards
| Previous: Michael Dokes vs. Donovan Ruddock | KO Magazine Knockout of the Year; 1991 | Next: Lennox Lewis vs. Donovan Ruddock |
