= Super cruiserweight =

Super cruiserweight, is a weight class in combat sports.

== Class description ==
Super cruiserweights, also called Junior Heavyweights, have been described as being in the gray 'zone' of 190 to 210 pounds by the IBA for world title purposes. The so-called categorization has gone as high in weight in description as 210 to 250 pounds by others. There is no general consensus on the upper and lower weight limits. This division encompasses what most governing bodies consider to be heavier cruiserweight fighters, or lighter heavyweights. It was introduced because of the growing number of heavyweights who are well in excess of their division's minimum (200 lbs) and the likelihood of mismatches between men who are considerably different in size, but are both "heavyweights".

Neither BoxRec or nor any major sanctioning body currently recognizes this division officially, although the minor International Boxing Association does have a champion and produces rankings.

In 2020, the World Boxing Council introduced the bridgerweight division, which has similar weight limits to those used in super cruiserweight fights. In 2023, the World Boxing Association introduced a "Bridgerweight" division with the same weight limits as the WBC's bridgerweight division.

== Division fight ==
Few famed fighters have fought for or are even aware of the so-called super cruiserweight title. The most famous fighter to have fought in the mystery division was James Toney. Former middleweight and super middleweight world champion Toney fought for the IBA super-cruiserweight title in 2001. Toney won the title by a second-round knockout over journeyman Saul Montana, but never defended it. Instead, he moved back down to the regular cruiserweight division, and won a world title there two years later.

Former light heavyweight and cruiserweight world champion Bobby Czyz won the vacant WBU world super cruiserweight title by stopping previously undefeated Richard Jackson in the sixth round in 1995. Czyz never defended that championship, opting to fight as a heavyweight instead.

Former heavyweight contender Orlin Norris won the vacant IBA Super Cruiserweight title by decisioning Adolfo Washington over 12 rounds in Michigan in 1998, and defended it by 12-round decision over former WBA World Cruiserweight champion Nate Miller in Louisiana later the same year. Two-time EBU European cruiserweight champion Vincenzo Cantatore, who unsuccessfully challenged for the vacant WBC world cruiserweight title in 2002 and for the WBO world cruiserweight title in 2005, won the vacant WBU world super cruiserweight title in 1998 and defended it three times before returning to the cruiserweight division. The late Greenland born Tue Bjorn Thomsen of Denmark, a heavyweight southpaw, won the vacant IBC Super Cruiserweight title by decisioning Nate Miller in Denmark in 2000 over 12 rounds. Thomsen defended the title by 12-round decision over Rob Calloway in 2001. Calloway had won the vacant IBA title in 2000 with a TKO-1 over Troy Weida but, after winning four non-title heavyweight bouts, challenged for Thomsen's title rather than defend the IBA belt.

BJ Flores, who would later challenge for world and interim world titles as a cruiserweight and as a heavyweight, won the IBA World super cruiserweight title by unanimously outpointing defending champion Patrick Nwamu over 12 rounds in 2007. Nwamu had won the vacant IBA title in 2006 at New York's famed Madison Square Garden and was make his first defense.

Rather than fight in this division, many fighters are often considered to be between cruiserweight and heavyweight in categorization, such as former cruiserweight and heavyweight world champion David Haye, who had to lose weight to fight in the cruiserweight division, while his natural body weight, while over 200 pounds, makes him considered by some experts to be somewhat small in weight for the modern heavyweight he subsequently fought in successfully.
