= Rydell Booker =

American boxer (born 1981)

Personal information
- Nickname: Rock n' Rye
- Born: Rydell Tyron Booker; February 17, 1981 (age 45) Detroit, Michigan, U.S.
- Height: 6 ft 3 in (191 cm)
- Weight: Cruiserweight; Heavyweight

Boxing career
- Reach: 81 in (206 cm)
- Stance: Orthodox

Boxing record
- Total fights: 45
- Wins: 27
- Win by KO: 14
- Losses: 17
- Draws: 1
Medal record
Men's amateur boxing
Representing United States
Golden Gloves
Silver medal – second place	2000 Detroit	Heavyweight
US National Championships
Bronze medal – third place	2001 Colorado Springs	Heavyweight
US U-19 National Championships
Gold medal – first place	1999 Marquette	Light-heavyweight

Rydell Tyron Booker (born 17 February 1981) is an American professional boxer. He was the former number one ranked amateur heavyweight in the United States.

== Amateur career ==
During his amateur career he won the Michigan State and Regional championships every year from 1992 through 2000, his first national title came in 1999. In 2001 he defeated Devin Vargas at the U.S. Challenge. As the top rated Heavyweight in the United States. Rydell was to represent the US at the World Championship in Ireland. During Training at Lake Placid, New York, he was accused of stealing a calling card from fellow fighter Jason Estrada, and decided to leave the team training and turn pro instead.

== Professional career ==
Much later in his professional career, while out of jail on bond and far from tip-top shape, he signed for an IBA world championship heavyweight bout with James Toney. Five months before, Booker had been arrested in Detroit with three other men and charged with possession of cocaine and intent to deliver more than 1,000 grams of the drug. On September 23, 2004, in Temecula, California, Rydell fought James Toney for the International Boxing Association heavyweight and WBC Continental Americas heavyweight championships. In the fight Booker was down in the eighth and then went on to lose the twelve-round decision.

== Incarceration ==
Shortly after his first professional loss to James Toney, Booker was convicted for possession of cocaine with intent to deliver over 1000 grams. He was sentenced to 12 to 30 years in prison. After serving over a decade, Booker was released, and won three comeback bouts of six rounds duration, before losing a televised ten round bout by unanimous decision to undefeated heavyweight Jermaine Franklin in Atlantic City's Boardwalk Hall.

== Professional boxing record ==
45 fights	27 wins	17 losses
By knockout	14	4
By decision	13	13
Draws	1	

No.	Result	Record	Opponent	Type	Round, time	Date	Location	Notes
45	Loss	27–17–1	Adrian Granat	KO	9 (10), 2:12	30 Oct 2026	Boxsporthalle Braamkamp, Winterhude, Hamburg, Germany	
44	Loss	27–16–1	Luis Gjolena	UD	6	May 16, 2026	State Fair Grounds, Columbia, South Carolina, U.S.	
43	Loss	27–15–1	Dardan Avdylaj	UD	6	Apr 18, 2026	Franz Guggenberger Sporthalle, Korneuburg, Austria	
42	Loss	27–14–1	Josh Popper	UD	6	Apr 7, 2026	Plaza Mariachi, Nashville, Tennessee, U.S.	
41	Loss	27–13–1	Jett Blackwell	UD	6	Mar 3, 2026	Plaza Mariachi, Nashville, Tennessee, U.S.	
40	Loss	27–12–1	Nestor Santana	UD	6	Jan 6, 2026	Texas Troubadour Theatre, Nashville, Tennessee, U.S.	
39	Loss	27–11–1	Petar Milas	TKO	5 (10), 1:54	Oct 18, 2025	Wandsbeker Sporthalle, Hamburg, Germany	
38	Loss	27–10–1	Fernando Cuza	UD	8	Sep 2, 2025	Texas Troubadour Theatre, Nashville, Tennessee, U.S.	
37	Loss	27–9–1	Yoandy Toirac	TKO	5 (8), 1:27	May 17, 2025	Fat Bottom Brewery, Nashville, Tennessee, U.S.	
36	Loss	27–8–1	Victor Vykhryst	UD	8	Apr 5, 2025	MBS Arena, Potsdam, Germany	
35	Win	27–7–1	Norman Neely	TKO	1 (6), 0:43	Dec 9, 2022	Newtown A.C. - "The NAC", Newton Township, Pennsylvania, U.S.	
34	Loss	26–7–1	Stephan Shaw	UD	8	Nov 22, 2022	Edison Ballroom, Manhattan, New York, U.S.	
33	Loss	26–6–1	Otto Wallin	UD	10	May 26, 2022	Ford Community Center, Dearborn, Michigan, U.S.	
32	Loss	26–5–1	Marcin Siwy	UD	8	Mar 26, 2022	Arena Bedzin, ul. Sportowa 20, Bedzin, Poland	
31	Draw	26–4–1	Ray Austin	SD	6	Nov 19, 2021	MotorCity Casino Hotel, Detroit, Michigan, U.S.	
30	Loss	26–4	Filip Hrgović	TKO	5 (10), 0:43	Nov 7, 2020	Seminole Hard Rock Hotel & Casino, Hollywood, Florida, U.S.	
29	Loss	26–3	Kubrat Pulev	UD	10	Nov 9, 2019	Chukchansi Park, Fresno, California, U.S.	
28	Win	26–2	Dieuly Aristilde	TKO	3 (6), 2:58	Jun 7, 2019	MotorCity Casino Hotel, Detroit, Michigan, U.S.	
27	Loss	25–2	Jermaine Franklin	UD	10	Apr 13, 2019	Boardwalk Hall, Atlantic City, New Jersey, U.S.	
26	Win	25–1	Domonic Jenkins	UD	6	Jul 13, 2018	MotorCity Casino Hotel, Detroit, Michigan, U.S.	
25	Win	24–1	Terrell Jamal Woods	UD	6	Apr 13, 2018	MotorCity Casino Hotel, Detroit, Michigan, U.S.	
24	Win	23–1	Rodney Moore	UD	6	Feb 2, 2018	Cameron Center, Laurel, Mississippi, U.S.	
23	Loss	22–1	James Toney	UD	12	Sep 23, 2004	Pechanga Resort and Casino, Temecula, California, U.S.	For vacant WBC Continental Americas and IBA heavyweight titles
22	Win	22–0	Tipton Walker	SD	8	Jun 18, 2004	Great Lakes Sports Arena, Fraser, Michigan, U.S.	
21	Win	21–0	Ken Murphy	TKO	3 (8)	May 21, 2004	Riehle Brothers Pavilion, Lafayette, Indiana, U.S.	
20	Win	20–0	Arthur Williams	UD	10	Jun 13, 2003	Joe Louis Arena, Detroit, Michigan, U.S.	
19	Win	19–0	Andrew Greeley	RTD	5 (10)	Mar 14, 2003	DeCarlo's Banquet Center, Warren, Michigan, U.S.	Retained WBC Youth cruiserweight title
18	Win	18–0	Uriah Grant	UD	10	Jan 10, 2003	DeCarlo's Banquet Center, Warren, Michigan, U.S.	
17	Win	17–0	Larry Prather	SD	6	Dec 14, 2002	Cambridge Place, Toledo, Ohio, U.S.	
16	Win	16–0	Art Jimmerson	TKO	2 (6)	Nov 23, 2002	Community Market, Danville, Virginia, U.S.	
15	Win	15–0	Leon Nkendzap	KO	1 (10), 1:23	Sep 20, 2002	DeCarlo's Banquet Center, Warren, Michigan, U.S.	Won vacant WBC Youth cruiserweight title
14	Win	14–0	Donnie Penelton	UD	4	Sep 5, 2002	Farm Bureau Building, Indianapolis, Indiana., U.S.	
13	Win	13–0	John Battle	UD	6	Aug 29, 2002	The Plex, North Charleston, South Carolina, U.S.	
12	Win	12–0	Eric Davis	UD	6	Aug 17, 2002	SeaGate Convention Centre, Toledo, Ohio, U.S.	
11	Win	11–0	Anthony Kohler	TKO	1 (4), 1:48	Aug 9, 2002	Cheaton's Bingo Hall, Akron, Ohio, U.S.	
10	Win	10–0	John Basil Jackson	UD	6	Jul 20, 2002	Leesburg Armory, Leesburg, Virginia, U.S.	
9	Win	9–0	Michael Shanks	TKO	2 (4)	Jun 28, 2002	Farm Bureau Building, Indianapolis, Indiana, U.S.	
8	Win	8–0	Ka-Dy King	UD	10	Jun 21, 2002	DeCarlo's Banquet Center, Warren, Michigan, U.S.	Won vacant USA Midwest, Mid American, and Michigan State cruiserweight titles
7	Win	7–0	Ronald Burnett	KO	1 (4), 0:40	Jun 1, 2002	Cumberland Place, West Lafayette, Indiana, U.S.	
6	Win	6–0	Roy Bedwell	KO	1 (4)	May 11, 2002	Gallatin, Tennessee, U.S.	
5	Win	5–0	Anthony Prince	KO	1 (6), 0:49	Mar 29, 2002	Club International, Detroit, Michigan, U.S.	
4	Win	4–0	Steve Thornton	TKO	1 (4), 1:27	Jan 31, 2002	The Roostertail, Detroit, Michigan, U.S.	
3	Win	3–0	Charles Judge	TKO	1 (4), 1:22	Nov 9, 2001	Club International, Detroit, Michigan, U.S.	
2	Win	2–0	Michael Moncrief	UD	4	Oct 12, 2001	Club International, Detroit, Michigan, U.S.	
1	Win	1–0	Mike White	TKO	1 (4), 1:10	Aug 10, 2001	Cobo Hall, Detroit, Michigan, U.S.	
