= List of boxing triple champions =

In boxing, a triple champion is a boxer who has won world titles in three weight classes. For most of the 20th century it was a remarkable and rare achievement accomplished by only a handful of fighters. Beginning in the 1970s, triple champions have become increasingly more common due to the proliferation of weight classes and sanctioning bodies in the sport. Bob Fitzsimmons was boxing's first triple champion, successively winning the middleweight, heavyweight and light heavyweight titles between 1894 and 1903.

== Early history ==
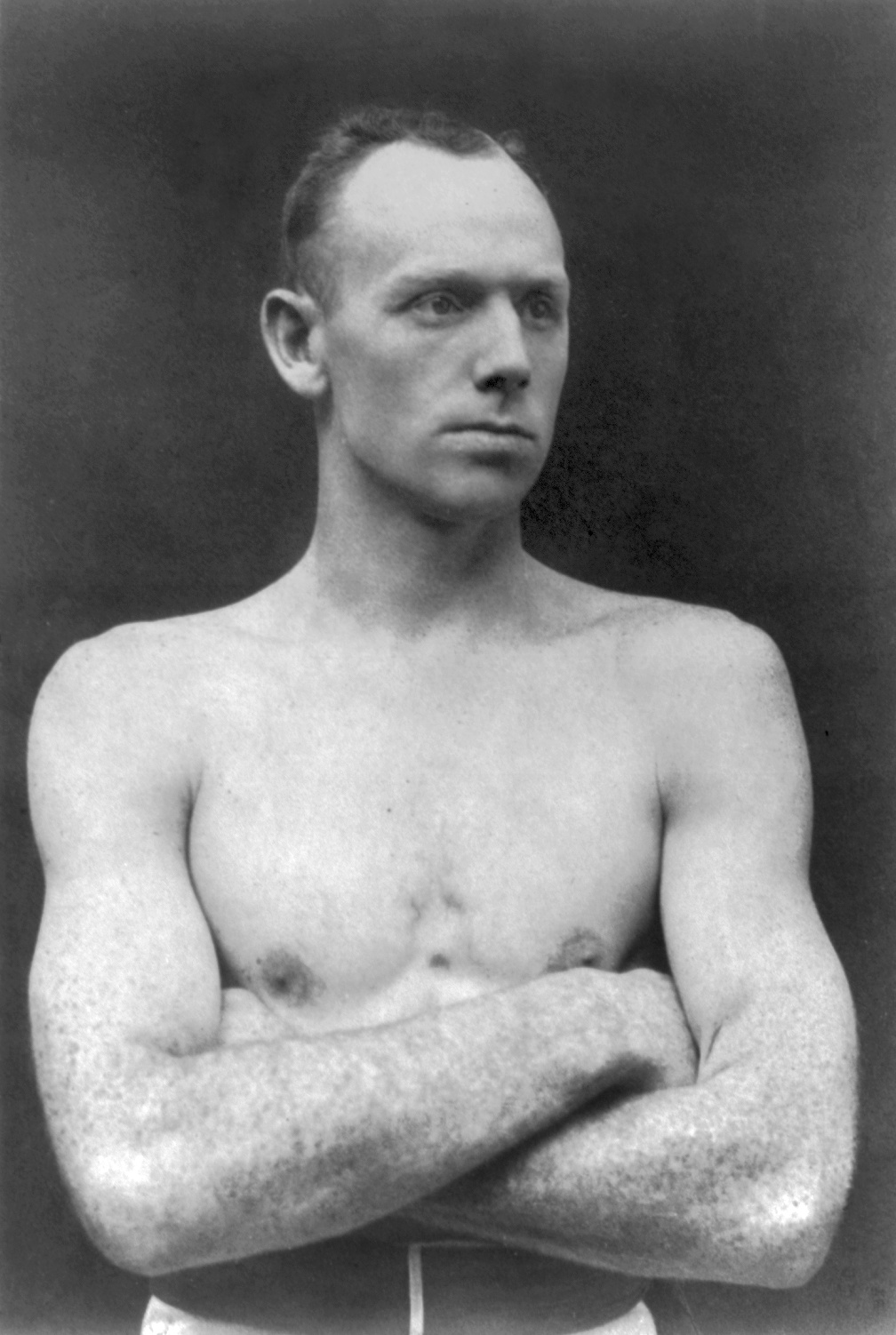
Bob Fitzsimmons was the first triple boxing champion in history, having won the light heavyweight, middleweight and heavyweight boxing championships.

The first triple champion of boxing was Bob Fitzsimmons when he added the light heavyweight title to his middleweight and heavyweight titles on November 25, 1903.

Barney Ross was the first boxer to simultaneously hold world titles in two different weight classes when he won the 135-pound lightweight and 140-pound light welterweight titles against Tony Canzoneri on June 23, 1933. Later Ross won the 147-pound welterweight world title from Jimmy McLarnin on May 28, 1934.

Henry Armstrong was the first man to hold three titles in three divisions simultaneously. He won the featherweight world title from Petey Sarron on October 29, 1937, the welterweight world title from Barney Ross on May 31, 1938, and the lightweight world title in his next fight, on August 17 against Lou Ambers. Armstrong then immediately vacated the featherweight world title because he could no longer make the weight.

Wilfred Benítez was the youngest ever champion at any weight. Benitez first won the 140-pound WBA light welterweight title from Antonio Cervantes on March 6, 1976, at the age of 17. He moved up in weight to win the 147-pound WBC welterweight title from Carlos Palomino on January 14, 1979, and finally won a third title when he added the 154-pound WBC light middleweight title from Maurice Hope on May 23, 1981.

== Recognition ==
=== Major sanctioning bodies ===
There is some dispute on which sanctioning bodies are considered "major" enough to be deemed legitimate world championships. The "Big Four" sanctioning bodies are always included:

- World Boxing Association (WBA) - founded in 1921 (as the National Boxing Association)
- World Boxing Council (WBC) - founded in 1963
- International Boxing Federation (IBF) - founded in 1983
- World Boxing Organization (WBO) - founded in 1988

==== The Ring ====
The Ring, boxing's most respected magazine, has awarded world championships in professional boxing within each weight class from its foundation in 1922 until the 1990s, and again since 2001. The Ring champions were, at one point, considered the linear reign to the throne, the man who beat the man. The lineal champion is also known as the true champion of the division. The Ring stopped awarding world titles in the 1990s but began again in 2002.

In 2002, The Ring created a championship system that is "intended to reward fighters who, by satisfying rigid criteria, can justify a claim as the true and only world champion in a given weight class." The Ring claims to be more authoritative and open than the sanctioning bodies' rankings, with a page devoted to full explanations for ranking changes. A fighter pays no sanctioning fees to defend or fight for the title at stake, contrary to practices of the sanctioning bodies. There are currently only two ways that a boxer can win The Ring's title: defeat the reigning champion; or win a box-off between The Ring's number-one and number-two rated contenders (or, sometimes, number-one and number-three rated). There are also only three ways that a boxer can lose The Ring's title: lose a championship fight, move to a different weight class, or retire. In May 2012, citing the number of vacancies in various weight classes as primary motivation, The Ring unveiled a new championship policy. Under the new policy, The Ring title can be awarded when the No. 1 and No. 2 ranked fighters face one another or when the No. 1 and 2 contenders choose not to fight one another and either of them fights No. 3, No. 4 or No. 5, the winner may be awarded The Ring title. In addition, there are now six ways for a fighter to lose his title: lose a fight in his championship weight class; move to another weight class; not schedule a fight in any weight class for 18 months; not schedule a fight in his championship weight class for 18 months, even if fighting at another weight class; not scheduling a fight with a top 5 contender in any weight class for two years; or retiring. Many media outlets and members are extremely critical of the new championship policy and state that if this new policy is followed The Ring title will lose the credibility it once held.

==== Lineal ====
The Transnational Boxing Rankings Board (TBRB) lists a version of the lineal championship in their rankings. TBRB lists a champion when their two top-ranked fighters in any division meet and currently recognizes legitimate world champions or "true champions" in each weight classes. The Board was formed to continue where The Ring "left off" in the aftermath of its purchase by Golden Boy Promotions in 2007 and the following dismissal of Nigel Collins. After the new editors announced a controversial new championship policy in May 2012, three prominent members of the Ring Advisory Panel resigned. These three members (Springs Toledo, Cliff Rold and Tim Starks) became the founding members of the Transnational Boxing Rankings Board, which was formed over the summer of 2012 with the assistance of Stewart Howe of England.

Since 2012, a version of lineal champions is predetermined by the Transnational Boxing Rankings Board, which promotes the concept of a singular world champion per weight class. Another version of lineal champions are listed on the Cyber Boxing Zone website which list lineal champions of the Queensberry Era to date.

=== Minor sanctioning bodies ===
They are: International Boxing Organization (IBO), World Professional Boxing Federation (WPBF), International Boxing Association (IBA), International Boxing Council (IBC), International Boxing Board (IBB), International Boxing League (IBL), International Boxing Union (IBU), Global Boxing Association (GBA), Global Boxing Council (GBC), Global Boxing Federation GBF, Global Boxing Organization (GBO), Global Boxing Union (GBU), National Boxing Association (NBA), Transcontinental World Boxing Association (TWBA), Universal Boxing Association (UBA), Universal Boxing Council (UBC), Universal Boxing Federation (UBF), Universal Boxing Organization (UBO), UNIBOX, United States Boxing Council (USBC), World Athletic Association (WAA), World Boxing Board (WBB), World Boxing Championship Committee (WBCC), World Boxing Foundation (WBFo), World Boxing Institute (WBI), World Boxing League (WBL), World Boxing Network (WBN), World Boxing Union (WBU).

Note:

- The International Boxing Association (IBA) is not to be confused with the International Boxing Association(AIBA), a French acronym for Association Internationale de Boxe Amateur, which sanctions amateur matches.
- The National Boxing Association (NBA) was established in 1984 and is not to be confused with the original National Boxing Association that was established in 1921 and changed its name to World Boxing Association (WBA) in 1962.

== List of men's triple champions ==
The following is a list of triple champions who have held titles from one or more of the "Big Four" organizations (WBA, WBC, IBF, WBO) and The Ring.

WBA has four recognized world champions, Super, Undisputed, Unified and Regular. The highest tier title is considered the primary champion of the division. Only boxers who are in the primary champion lineage are listed.

The ranking of WBA's primary champions are as follows:

- Super/Undisputed
- Unified
- Regular

Other former international/national-world boxing commissions and organizations from the beginning of boxing are also included here:

- New York State Athletic Commission (NYSAC)
- National Boxing Association (NBA) - changed its name to World Boxing Association (**WBA**) in 1962

	Inducted into the International Boxing Hall of Fame
	World titles from World and The Ring
‡	**WBA** Regular Champion as primary title because **WBA** Super, Undisputed, and Unified is vacant/vacated during his title reign.

No.	Name	Titles	Date	Opponent	Result
1	Bob Fitzsimmons	**World** Middleweight	Jan 14, 1891	Nonpareil Dempsey	RTD 13/?
1	Bob Fitzsimmons	**World** Heavyweight	Mar 17, 1897	James J. Corbett	KO 14/25
1	Bob Fitzsimmons	**World** Light heavyweight	**Nov 25, 1903**	George Gardiner	PTS 20/20
2	Tony Canzoneri	**NYSAC** Featherweight	Oct 24, 1927	Johnny Dundee	UD 15/15
2	Tony Canzoneri	**NBA** Featherweight	Feb 10, 1928	Benny Bass	SD 12/12
2	Tony Canzoneri	**The Ring** Featherweight	Feb 10, 1928	Benny Bass	SD 12/12
2	Tony Canzoneri	**NYSAC** Lightweight	Oct 14, 1930	Al Singer	KO 1/15
2	Tony Canzoneri	**NBA** Lightweight	Oct 14, 1930	Al Singer	KO 1/15
2	Tony Canzoneri	**The Ring** Lightweight	Oct 14, 1930	Al Singer	KO 1/15
2	Tony Canzoneri	**NBA** Light welterweight	**Apr 24, 1931**	Jack Kid Berg	KO 3/10
2	Tony Canzoneri	**The Ring** Light welterweight	**Apr 24, 1931**	Jack Kid Berg	KO 3/10
2	Tony Canzoneri	**World** Light welterweight	May 21, 1933	Battling Shaw	UD 10/10
2	Tony Canzoneri	**NYSAC** Lightweight – (**2**)	May 10, 1935	Lou Ambers	UD 15/15
2	Tony Canzoneri	**NBA** Lightweight – (**2**)	May 10, 1935	Lou Ambers	UD 15/15
2	Tony Canzoneri	**The Ring** Lightweight – (**2**)	May 10, 1935	Lou Ambers	UD 15/15
3	Barney Ross	**NYSAC** Lightweight	Jun 23, 1933	Tony Canzoneri	MD 10/10
3	Barney Ross	**NBA** Lightweight	Jun 23, 1933	Tony Canzoneri	MD 10/10
3	Barney Ross	**The Ring** Lightweight	Jun 23, 1933	Tony Canzoneri	MD 10/10
3	Barney Ross	**World** Light welterweight	Jun 23, 1933	Tony Canzoneri	MD 10/10
3	Barney Ross	**NYSAC** Welterweight	**May 28, 1934**	Jimmy McLarnin	SD 15/15
3	Barney Ross	**NBA** Welterweight	**May 28, 1934**	Jimmy McLarnin	SD 15/15
3	Barney Ross	**The Ring** Welterweight	**May 28, 1934**	Jimmy McLarnin	SD 15/15
3	Barney Ross	**NYSAC** Welterweight – (**2**)	May 28, 1935	Jimmy McLarnin	UD 15/15
3	Barney Ross	**NBA** Welterweight – (**2**)	May 28, 1935	Jimmy McLarnin	UD 15/15
3	Barney Ross	**The Ring** Welterweight – (**2**)	May 28, 1935	Jimmy McLarnin	UD 15/15
4	Henry Armstrong	**NYSAC** Featherweight	Oct 24, 1937	Petey Sarron	KO 6/15
4	Henry Armstrong	**NBA** Featherweight	Oct 24, 1937	Petey Sarron	KO 6/15
4	Henry Armstrong	**The Ring** Featherweight	Oct 24, 1937	Petey Sarron	KO 6/15
4	Henry Armstrong	**NYSAC** Welterweight	May 31, 1938	Barney Ross	UD 15/15
4	Henry Armstrong	**NBA** Welterweight	May 31, 1938	Barney Ross	UD 15/15
4	Henry Armstrong	**The Ring** Welterweight	May 31, 1938	Barney Ross	UD 15/15
4	Henry Armstrong	**NYSAC** Lightweight	**Aug 17, 1938**	Lou Ambers	SD 15/15
4	Henry Armstrong	**NBA** Lightweight	**Aug 17, 1938**	Lou Ambers	SD 15/15
4	Henry Armstrong	**The Ring** Lightweight	**Aug 17, 1938**	Lou Ambers	SD 15/15
5	Emile Griffith	**NYSAC** Welterweight	Apr 1, 1961	Benny Paret	KO 13/15
5	Emile Griffith	**NBA** Welterweight	Apr 1, 1961	Benny Paret	KO 13/15
5	Emile Griffith	**The Ring** Welterweight	Apr 1, 1961	Benny Paret	KO 13/15
5	Emile Griffith	**NYSAC** Welterweight – (**2**)	Mar 24, 1962	Benny Paret	TKO 12/15
5	Emile Griffith	**NBA** Welterweight – (**2**), Renamed to WBA in his 2nd title defense.	Mar 24, 1962	Benny Paret	TKO 12/15
5	Emile Griffith	**The Ring** Welterweight – (**2**)	Mar 24, 1962	Benny Paret	TKO 12/15
5	Emile Griffith	**World** Light middleweight (recognized only by Austria)	Oct 17, 1962	Ted Wright	PTS 15/15
5	Emile Griffith	**WBC** Welterweight	Feb 1963	**Awarded**	
5	Emile Griffith	**WBA** Welterweight – (**3**)	Jun 8, 1963	Luis Manuel Rodríguez	SD 15/15
5	Emile Griffith	**WBC** Welterweight – (**2**)	Jun 8, 1963	Luis Manuel Rodríguez	SD 15/15
5	Emile Griffith	**The Ring** Welterweight – (**3**)	Jun 8, 1963	Luis Manuel Rodríguez	SD 15/15
5	Emile Griffith	**WBA** Middleweight	**Apr 25, 1966**	Dick Tiger	UD 15/15
5	Emile Griffith	**WBC** Middleweight	**Apr 25, 1966**	Dick Tiger	UD 15/15
5	Emile Griffith	**The Ring** Middleweight	**Apr 25, 1966**	Dick Tiger	UD 15/15
5	Emile Griffith	**WBA** Middleweight – (**2**)	Sep 29, 1967	Nino Benvenuti	MD 15/15
5	Emile Griffith	**WBC** Middleweight – (**2**)	Sep 29, 1967	Nino Benvenuti	MD 15/15
5	Emile Griffith	**The Ring** Middleweight – (**2**)	Sep 29, 1967	Nino Benvenuti	MD 15/15
6	Wilfred Benítez	**WBA** Light welterweight	Mar 6, 1976	Antonio Cervantes	SD 15/15
6	Wilfred Benítez	**The Ring** Light welterweight	Mar 6, 1976	Antonio Cervantes	SD 15/15
6	Wilfred Benítez	**WBC** Welterweight	Jan 14, 1979	Carlos Palomino	SD 15/15
6	Wilfred Benítez	**The Ring** Welterweight	Jan 14, 1979	Carlos Palomino	SD 15/15
6	Wilfred Benítez	**WBC** Light middleweight	**May 23, 1981**	Maurice Hope	KO 12/15
7	Alexis Argüello	**WBA** Featherweight	Nov 23, 1974	Rubén Olivares	KO 13/15
7	Alexis Argüello	**The Ring** Featherweight	May 31, 1975	Rigoberto Riasco	TKO 2/15
7	Alexis Argüello	**WBC** Super featherweight	Jan 28, 1978	Alfredo Escalera	TKO 13/15
7	Alexis Argüello	**WBC** Lightweight	**Jun 20, 1981**	Jim Watt	UD 15/15
7	Alexis Argüello	**The Ring** Lightweight	**Jun 20, 1981**	Jim Watt	UD 15/15
8	Roberto Durán	**WBA** Lightweight	Jun 26, 1972	Ken Buchanan	TKO 13/15
8	Roberto Durán	**The Ring** Lightweight	Jun 26, 1972	Ken Buchanan	TKO 13/15
8	Roberto Durán	**WBC** Lightweight	Jan 21, 1978	Esteban de Jesús	TKO 12/15
8	Roberto Durán	**WBC** Welterweight	Jun 20, 1980	Sugar Ray Leonard	UD 15/15
8	Roberto Durán	**The Ring** Welterweight	Jun 20, 1980	Sugar Ray Leonard	UD 15/15
8	Roberto Durán	**WBA** Light middleweight	**Jun 26, 1983**	Davey Moore	TKO 8/15
9	Wilfredo Gómez	**WBC** Super bantamweight	May 21, 1977	Yum Dong-Kyun	KO 12/15
9	Wilfredo Gómez	**The Ring** Super bantamweight	Mar 9, 1979	Néstor Carlos Jiménez	KO 5/15
9	Wilfredo Gómez	**WBC** Featherweight	Mar 31, 1984	Juan Laporte	UD 12/12
9	Wilfredo Gómez	**WBA** Super featherweight	**May 19, 1985**	Rocky Lockridge	MD 15/15
9	Wilfredo Gómez	**The Ring** Super featherweight	**May 19, 1985**	Rocky Lockridge	MD 15/15
10	Sugar Ray Leonard	**WBC** Welterweight	Nov 30, 1979	Wilfred Benítez	TKO 15/15
10	Sugar Ray Leonard	**The Ring** Welterweight	Nov 30, 1979	Wilfred Benítez	TKO 15/15
10	Sugar Ray Leonard	**WBC** Welterweight – (**2**)	Nov 25, 1980	Roberto Durán	TKO 8/15
10	Sugar Ray Leonard	**The Ring** Welterweight – (**2**)	Nov 25, 1980	Roberto Durán	TKO 8/15
10	Sugar Ray Leonard	**WBA** Light middleweight	Jun 25, 1981	Ayub Kalule	TKO 9/15
10	Sugar Ray Leonard	**The Ring** Light middleweight	Jun 25, 1981	Ayub Kalule	TKO 9/15
10	Sugar Ray Leonard	**WBA** Welterweight	Sep 16, 1981	Thomas Hearns	TKO 14/15
10	Sugar Ray Leonard	**WBC** Middleweight	**Apr 6, 1987**	Marvin Hagler	SD 12/12
10	Sugar Ray Leonard	**The Ring** Middleweight	**Apr 6, 1987**	Marvin Hagler	SD 12/12
11	Thomas Hearns	**WBA** Welterweight	Aug 2, 1980	Pipino Cuevas	TKO 2/15
11	Thomas Hearns	**WBC** Light middleweight	Dec 3, 1982	Wilfred Benítez	MD 15/15
11	Thomas Hearns	**The Ring** Light middleweight	Dec 3, 1982	Wilfred Benítez	MD 15/15
11	Thomas Hearns	**WBC** Light heavyweight	**Mar 7, 1987**	Dennis Andries	TKO 10/12
11	Thomas Hearns	**WBA** Light heavyweight	Jun 3, 1991	Virgil Hill	UD 12/12
12	Jeff Fenech	**IBF** Bantamweight	Apr 26, 1985	Satoshi Shingaki	TKO 9/15
12	Jeff Fenech	**WBC** Super bantamweight	May 8, 1987	Samart Payakaroon	KO 4/15
12	Jeff Fenech	**WBC** Featherweight	**Mar 7, 1988**	Victor Callejas	TKO 10/15
13	Héctor Camacho	**WBC** Super featherweight	Aug 7, 1983	Rafael Limón	TKO 5/12
13	Héctor Camacho	**WBC** Lightweight	Aug 10, 1985	José Luis Ramírez	UD 12/12
13	Héctor Camacho	**WBO** Light welterweight	**Mar 6, 1989**	Ray Mancini	SD 12/12
13	Héctor Camacho	**WBO** Light welterweight – (**2**)	May 18, 1991	Greg Haugen	SD 12/12
14	Julio César Chávez	**WBC** Super featherweight	Sep 13, 1984	Mario Martínez	TKO 8/12
14	Julio César Chávez	**WBA** Lightweight	Nov 21, 1987	Edwin Rosario	TKO 11/12
14	Julio César Chávez	**WBC** Lightweight	Oct 29, 1988	José Luis Ramírez	TD 11/12
14	Julio César Chávez	**The Ring** Lightweight	Oct 29, 1988	José Luis Ramírez	TD 11/12
14	Julio César Chávez	**WBC** Light welterweight	**May 13, 1989**	Roger Mayweather	RTD 10/12
14	Julio César Chávez	**IBF** Light welterweight	Mar 17, 1990	Meldrick Taylor	TKO 12/12
14	Julio César Chávez	**WBC** Light welterweight – (**2**)	May 7, 1994	Frankie Randall	TD 8/12
15	Iran Barkley	**WBC** Middleweight	Jun 6, 1988	Thomas Hearns	TKO 3/12
15	Iran Barkley	**IBF** Super middleweight	Jan 10, 1992	Darrin Van Horn	TKO 2/12
15	Iran Barkley	**WBA** Light heavyweight	**Mar 20, 1992**	Thomas Hearns	SD 12/12
16	Duke McKenzie	**IBF** Flyweight	Oct 5, 1988	Rolando Bohol	TKO 11/12
16	Duke McKenzie	**WBO** Bantamweight	Jun 30, 1991	Gaby Canizales	UD 12/12
16	Duke McKenzie	**WBO** Super bantamweight	**Oct 15, 1992**	Jesse Benavides	UD 12/12
17	Pernell Whitaker	**IBF** Lightweight	Feb 18, 1989	Greg Haugen	UD 12/12
17	Pernell Whitaker	**WBC** Lightweight	Aug 20, 1989	José Luis Ramírez	UD 12/12
17	Pernell Whitaker	**The Ring** Lightweight	Aug 20, 1989	José Luis Ramírez	UD 12/12
17	Pernell Whitaker	**WBA** Lightweight	Aug 11, 1990	Juan Nazario	KO 1/12
17	Pernell Whitaker	**IBF** Light welterweight	Jul 18, 1992	Rafael Pineda	UD 12/12
17	Pernell Whitaker	**WBC** Welterweight	**Mar 6, 1993**	James McGirt	UD 12/12
18	Mike McCallum	**WBA** Light middleweight	Oct 19, 1984	Sean Mannion	UD 12/12
18	Mike McCallum	**WBA** Middleweight	May 10, 1989	Herol Graham	SD 12/12
18	Mike McCallum	**WBC** Light heavyweight	**Jul 23, 1994**	Jeff Harding	UD 12/12
19	Wilfredo Vázquez	**WBA** Bantamweight	Oct 4, 1987	Park Chan-Young	TKO 10/15
19	Wilfredo Vázquez	**WBA** Super bantamweight	May 27, 1992	Raúl Pérez	TKO 2/15
19	Wilfredo Vázquez	**WBA** Featherweight	**May 18, 1996**	Eloy Rojas	TKO 11/12
20	Oscar De La Hoya	**WBO** Super featherweight	Mar 5, 1994	Jimmy Bredahl	TKO 10/12
20	Oscar De La Hoya	**WBO** Lightweight	Feb 18, 1995	John-John Molina	UD 12/12
20	Oscar De La Hoya	**IBF** Lightweight	May 6, 1995	Rafael Ruelas	TKO 2/12
20	Oscar De La Hoya	**WBC** Light welterweight	**Jun 7, 1996**	Julio César Chávez	TKO 4/12
21	Roy Jones Jr.	**IBF** Middleweight	May 22, 1993	Bernard Hopkins	UD 12/12
21	Roy Jones Jr.	**IBF** Super middleweight	Oct 21, 1993	James Toney	UD 12/12
21	Roy Jones Jr.	**WBC** Light heavyweight	**Jan 13, 1997**	**Interim promoted**	
21	Roy Jones Jr.	**WBC** Light heavyweight – (**2**)	Aug 7, 1997	Montell Griffin	KO 1/12
21	Roy Jones Jr.	**WBC** Light heavyweight – (**3**)	Jun 1998	**Reinstated**	
21	Roy Jones Jr.	**WBA** Light heavyweight, later promoted to inaugural Super champion; Status changed to Unified champion on WBA's official rankings.	Jul 18, 1998	Lou Del Valle	UD 12/12
21	Roy Jones Jr.	**WBA** Light heavyweight, later promoted to inaugural Super champion; Status changed to Unified champion on WBA's official rankings.	Super; Dec 2000	Lou Del Valle	UD 12/12
21	Roy Jones Jr.	**WBA** Light heavyweight, later promoted to inaugural Super champion; Status changed to Unified champion on WBA's official rankings.	Unified; Aug 5, 2002	Lou Del Valle	UD 12/12
21	Roy Jones Jr.	**IBF** Light heavyweight	Jun 5, 1999	Reggie Johnson	UD 12/12
21	Roy Jones Jr.	**The Ring** Light heavyweight	Dec 2, 2001	**Awarded**	
21	Roy Jones Jr.	**WBA** (Unified) Light heavyweight – (**2**)	Nov 8, 2003	Antonio Tarver	UD 12/12
21	Roy Jones Jr.	**WBC** Light heavyweight – (**4**)	Nov 8, 2003	Antonio Tarver	UD 12/12
22	Leo Gámez	**WBA** Mini flyweight	Jan 10, 1988	Kim Bong Jun	UD 12/12
22	Leo Gámez	**WBA** Light flyweight	Oct 21, 1993	Shiro Yahiro	TKO 9/12
22	Leo Gámez	**WBA** Flyweight	**Mar 13, 1999**	Hugo Rafael Soto	KO 3/12
23	Félix Trinidad	**IBF** Welterweight	Jun 19, 1993	Maurice Blocker	KO 2/12
23	Félix Trinidad	**WBC** Welterweight	Sep 18, 1999	Oscar De La Hoya	MD 12/12
23	Félix Trinidad	**WBA** Light middleweight	Mar 3, 2000	David Reid	UD 12/12
23	Félix Trinidad	**IBF** Light middleweight	Dec 2, 2000	Fernando Vargas	TKO 12/12
23	Félix Trinidad	**WBA** Middleweight	**May 12, 2001**	William Joppy	TKO 5/12
24	Johnny Tapia	**WBO** Super flyweight	Oct 12, 1994	Henry Martínez	TKO 11/12
24	Johnny Tapia	**IBF** Super flyweight	Jul 18, 1997	Danny Romero	UD 12/12
24	Johnny Tapia	**WBA** Bantamweight	Dec 5, 1998	Nana Konadu	MD 12/12
24	Johnny Tapia	**WBO** Bantamweight	Jan 8, 2000	Jorge Eliécer Julio	UD 12/12
24	Johnny Tapia	**IBF** Featherweight	**Apr 27, 2002**	Manuel Medina	MD 12/12
25	James Toney	**IBF** Middleweight	Jun 10, 1991	Michael Nunn	TKO 11/12
25	James Toney	**IBF** Super middleweight	Feb 13, 1993	Iran Barkley	UD 12/12
25	James Toney	**IBF** Cruiserweight	**May 26, 2003**	Vassiliy Jirov	UD 12/12
26	Shane Mosley	**IBF** Lightweight	Aug 2, 1997	Philip Holiday	UD 12/12
26	Shane Mosley	**WBC** Welterweight	Jun 17, 2000	Oscar De La Hoya	SD 12/12
26	Shane Mosley	**WBA** (Unified) Light middleweight	**Sep 13, 2003**	Oscar De La Hoya	UD 12/12
26	Shane Mosley	**WBC** Light middleweight	**Sep 13, 2003**	Oscar De La Hoya	UD 12/12
26	Shane Mosley	**The Ring** Light middleweight	**Sep 13, 2003**	Oscar De La Hoya	UD 12/12
26	Shane Mosley	**WBA** (Super) Welterweight	Jan 24, 2009	Antonio Margarito	TKO 9/12
27	Manny Pacquiao	**WBC** Flyweight	Dec 4, 1998	Chatchai Sasakul	KO 8/12
27	Manny Pacquiao	**IBF** Super bantamweight	Jun 23, 2001	Lehlohonolo Ledwaba	KO 6/12
27	Manny Pacquiao	**The Ring** Featherweight	**Nov 15, 2003**	Marco Antonio Barrera	TKO 11/12
28	Érik Morales	**WBC** Super bantamweight	Sep 6, 1997	Daniel Zaragoza	KO 11/12
28	Érik Morales	**WBO** Super bantamweight	Feb 19, 2000	Marco Antonio Barrera	SD 12/12
28	Érik Morales	**WBC** Featherweight	Feb 17, 2001	Guty Espadas Jr.	UD 12/12
28	Érik Morales	**WBC** Featherweight – (**2**)	Nov 16, 2002	Paulie Ayala	UD 12/12
28	Érik Morales	**WBC** Super featherweight	**Feb 28, 2004**	Jesús Chávez	UD 12/12
28	Érik Morales	**IBF** Super featherweight	Jul 31, 2004	Carlos Hernández	UD 12/12
29	Marco Antonio Barrera	**WBO** Super bantamweight	Mar 31, 1995	Daniel Jiménez	UD 12/12
29	Marco Antonio Barrera	**WBO** Super bantamweight – (**2**)	Oct 31, 1998	Richie Wenton	RTD 3/12
29	Marco Antonio Barrera	**WBO** Super bantamweight – (**3**)	Feb 24, 2000	**Reinstated**	
29	Marco Antonio Barrera	**WBC** Featherweight	Jun 22, 2002	Érik Morales	UD 12/12
29	Marco Antonio Barrera	**The Ring** Featherweight	Jun 22, 2002	Érik Morales	UD 12/12
29	Marco Antonio Barrera	**WBC** Super featherweight	**Nov 27, 2004**	Érik Morales	MD 12/12
29	Marco Antonio Barrera	**IBF** Super featherweight	Sep 17, 2005	Robbie Peden	UD 12/12
30	Floyd Mayweather Jr.	**WBC** Super featherweight	Oct 3, 1998	Genaro Hernandez	RTD 8/12
30	Floyd Mayweather Jr.	**WBC** Lightweight	Apr 20, 2002	José Luis Castillo	UD 12/12
30	Floyd Mayweather Jr.	**The Ring** Lightweight	Apr 20, 2002	José Luis Castillo	UD 12/12
30	Floyd Mayweather Jr.	**WBC** Light welterweight	**Jun 25, 2005**	Arturo Gatti	TKO 6/12
31	Juan Manuel Márquez	**IBF** Featherweight	Feb 1, 2003	Manuel Medina	TKO 7/12
31	Juan Manuel Márquez	**WBA** (Unified) Featherweight	Nov 1, 2003	Derrick Gainer	TD 7/12
31	Juan Manuel Márquez	**WBO** Featherweight	Dec 6, 2006	**Interim promoted**	
31	Juan Manuel Márquez	**WBC** Super featherweight	Mar 17, 2007	Marco Antonio Barrera	UD 12/12
31	Juan Manuel Márquez	**The Ring** Lightweight	**Sep 13, 2008**	Joel Casamayor	TKO 11/12
31	Juan Manuel Márquez	**WBA** (Super) Lightweight	Feb 28, 2009	Juan Díaz	TKO 9/12
31	Juan Manuel Márquez	**WBO** Lightweight	Feb 28, 2009	Juan Díaz	TKO 9/12
32	Fernando Montiel	**WBO** Flyweight	Dec 15, 2000	Isidro García	TKO 7/12
32	Fernando Montiel	**WBO** Super flyweight	Jun 22, 2002	Pedro Alcázar	TKO 6/12
32	Fernando Montiel	**WBO** Super flyweight – (**2**)	Apr 9, 2005	Ivan Hernández	KO 7/12
32	Fernando Montiel	**WBO** Bantamweight	**Apr 25, 2009**	**Interim promoted**	
32	Fernando Montiel	**WBC** Bantamweight	Apr 30, 2010	Hozumi Hasegawa	TKO 4/12
33	Miguel Cotto	**WBO** Light welterweight	Sep 11, 2004	Kelson Pinto	TKO 6/12
33	Miguel Cotto	**WBA** Welterweight	Dec 2, 2006	Carlos Quintana	RTD 5/12
33	Miguel Cotto	**WBO** Welterweight	Feb 21, 2009	Michael Jennings	TKO 5/12
33	Miguel Cotto	**WBA** Light middleweight	**Jun 5, 2010**	Yuri Foreman	TKO 9/12
33	Miguel Cotto	**WBA** Light middleweight	Super; Oct 15, 2010	**Regular**^{‡} **promoted**	
33	Miguel Cotto	**WBO** Light middleweight	Aug 26, 2017	Yoshihiro Kamegai	UD 12/12
34	Jorge Arce	**WBO** Light flyweight	Dec 5, 1998	Juan Domingo Cordoba	UD 12/12
34	Jorge Arce	**WBC** Light flyweight	Jul 6, 2002	Choi Yo-sam	TKO 6/12
34	Jorge Arce	**WBO** Super flyweight	Jan 30, 2010	Angky Angkotta	TD 7/12
34	Jorge Arce	**WBO** Super bantamweight	**May 7, 2011**	Wilfredo Vázquez Jr.	TKO 12/12
35	Nonito Donaire	**IBF** Flyweight	Jul 7, 2007	Vic Darchinyan	TKO 5/12
35	Nonito Donaire	**WBC** Bantamweight	Feb 19, 2011	Fernando Montiel	KO 2/12
35	Nonito Donaire	**WBO** Bantamweight	Feb 19, 2011	Fernando Montiel	KO 2/12
35	Nonito Donaire	**WBO** Super bantamweight	**Feb 4, 2012**	Wilfredo Vázquez Jr.	SD 12/12
35	Nonito Donaire	**IBF** Super bantamweight	Jul 7, 2012	Jeffrey Mathebula	UD 12/12
35	Nonito Donaire	**The Ring** Super bantamweight	Oct 13, 2012	Toshiaki Nishioka	SD 12/12
35	Nonito Donaire	**WBO** Super bantamweight – (**2**)	Dec 11, 2015	Cesar Juarez	UD 12/12
35	Nonito Donaire	**WBA** (Super) Bantamweight	Nov 3, 2018	Ryan Burnett	RTD 4/12
35	Nonito Donaire	**WBC** Bantamweight – (**2**)	May 29, 2021	Nordine Oubaali	KO 4/12
36	Abner Mares	**IBF** Bantamweight	Aug 13, 2011	Joseph Agbeko	MD 12/12
36	Abner Mares	**WBC** Super bantamweight	Apr 21, 2012	Eric Morel	UD 12/12
36	Abner Mares	**WBC** Featherweight	**May 4, 2013**	Daniel Ponce de León	TKO 9/12
37	Adrien Broner	**WBO** Super featherweight	Nov 26, 2011	Vicente Martín Rodríguez	KO 3/12
37	Adrien Broner	**WBC** Lightweight	Nov 17, 2012	Antonio DeMarco	TKO 8/12
37	Adrien Broner	**WBA** Welterweight	**Jun 22, 2013**	Paulie Malignaggi	SD 12/12
38	Román González	**WBA** Mini flyweight	Sep 15, 2008	Yutaka Niida	TKO 4/12
38	Román González	**WBA** Light flyweight	Regular^{‡} Feb 4, 2011	**Interim promoted**	
38	Román González	**WBA** Light flyweight	Super; Nov 30, 2012	**Regular**^{‡} **promoted**	
38	Román González	**WBC** Flyweight	**Sep 5, 2014**	Akira Yaegashi	TKO 9/12
38	Román González	**The Ring** Flyweight	**Sep 5, 2014**	Akira Yaegashi	TKO 9/12
39	Jorge Linares	**WBC** Featherweight	Jul 31, 2007	**Interim promoted**	
39	Jorge Linares	**WBA** Super featherweight	Nov 8, 2008	Whyber Garcia	TKO 5/12
39	Jorge Linares	**WBC** Lightweight	**Dec 30, 2014**	Javier Prieto	KO 4/12
39	Jorge Linares	**WBA** Lightweight	Sep 24, 2016	Anthony Crolla	UD 12/12
39	Jorge Linares	**The Ring** Lightweight	Sep 24, 2016	Anthony Crolla	UD 12/12
40	Léo Santa Cruz	**IBF** Bantamweight	Jun 2, 2012	Vusi Malinga	UD 12/12
40	Léo Santa Cruz	**WBC** Super bantamweight	Aug 24, 2014	Victor Terrazas	TKO 3/12
40	Léo Santa Cruz	**WBA** (Super) Featherweight	**Aug 29, 2015**	Abner Mares	MD 12/12
40	Léo Santa Cruz	**WBA** (Super) Featherweight – (**2**)	Jul 30, 2016	Carl Frampton	MD 12/12
41	Akira Yaegashi	**WBA** Mini flyweight	Oct 24, 2011	Pornsawan Porpramook	TKO 10/12
41	Akira Yaegashi	**WBC** Flyweight	Apr 8, 2013	Toshiyuki Igarashi	UD 12/12
41	Akira Yaegashi	**The Ring** Flyweight	Apr 8, 2013	Toshiyuki Igarashi	UD 12/12
41	Akira Yaegashi	**IBF** Light flyweight	**Dec 29, 2015**	Javier Mendoza	UD 12/12
42	Ricky Burns	**WBO** Super featherweight	Sep 4, 2010	Román Martínez	UD 12/12
42	Ricky Burns	**WBO** Lightweight	Jan 26, 2012	**Interim promoted**	
42	Ricky Burns	**WBA** Light welterweight	**May 28, 2016**	Michele di Rocco	TKO 8/12
43	Kazuto Ioka	**WBC** Mini flyweight	Feb 11, 2011	Oleydong Sithsamerchai	TKO 5/12
43	Kazuto Ioka	**WBA** Mini flyweight	Jun 20, 2012	Akira Yaegashi	UD 12/12
43	Kazuto Ioka	**WBA** (Regular^{‡}) Light flyweight	Jan 14, 2014	**Primary champion vacant**	
43	Kazuto Ioka	**WBA** (Regular^{‡}) Flyweight	**Sep 14, 2016**	**Primary champion vacant**	
44	Hozumi Hasegawa	**WBC** Bantamweight	Apr 16, 2005	Veeraphol Sahaprom	UD 12/12
44	Hozumi Hasegawa	**WBC** Featherweight	Nov 26, 2010	Juan Carlos Burgos	TKO 3/12
44	Hozumi Hasegawa	**WBC** Super bantamweight	**Sep 16, 2016**	Hugo Ruiz	RTD 10/12
45	Mikey Garcia	**WBO** Featherweight	Jan 19, 2013	Orlando Salido	TD 9/12
45	Mikey Garcia	**The Ring** Featherweight	Jan 19, 2013	Orlando Salido	TD 9/12
45	Mikey Garcia	**WBO** Super featherweight	Nov 9, 2013	Román Martínez	KO 8/12
45	Mikey Garcia	**WBC** Lightweight	**Jan 28, 2017**	Dejan Zlatičanin	KO 3/12
45	Mikey Garcia	**IBF** Lightweight	Jul 28, 2018	Robert Easter Jr.	UD 12/12
46	Donnie Nietes	**WBO** Mini flyweight	Sep 7, 2007	Pornsawan Porpramook	UD 12/12
46	Donnie Nietes	**WBO** Light flyweight	Oct 8, 2011	Ramón García Hirales	UD 12/12
46	Donnie Nietes	**The Ring** Light flyweight	May 10, 2014	Moisés Fuentes	TKO 9/12
46	Donnie Nietes	**IBF** Flyweight	**Apr 29, 2017**	Komgrich Nantapech	UD 12/12
47	Vasyl Lomachenko	**WBO** Featherweight	Jun 21, 2014	Gary Russell Jr.	MD 12/12
47	Vasyl Lomachenko	**WBO** Super featherweight	Jun 11, 2016	Román Martínez	KO 5/12
47	Vasyl Lomachenko	**WBA** (Super) Lightweight	**May 12, 2018**	Jorge Linares	TKO 10/12
47	Vasyl Lomachenko	**The Ring** Lightweight	**May 12, 2018**	Jorge Linares	TKO 10/12
47	Vasyl Lomachenko	**WBO** Lightweight	Dec 8, 2018	José Pedraza	UD 12/12
47	Vasyl Lomachenko	**WBC** Lightweight	Aug 31, 2019	Luke Campbell	UD 12/12
47	Vasyl Lomachenko	**IBF** Lightweight	May 11, 2024	George Kambosos Jr	TKO 11/12
48	Terence Crawford	**WBO** Lightweight	Mar 1, 2014	Ricky Burns	UD 12/12
48	Terence Crawford	**The Ring** Lightweight	Nov 29, 2014	Ray Beltrán	UD 12/12
48	Terence Crawford	**WBO** Light welterweight	Apr 18, 2015	Thomas Dulorme	TKO 6/12
48	Terence Crawford	**WBC** Light welterweight	Jul 23, 2016	Viktor Postol	UD 12/12
48	Terence Crawford	**The Ring** Light welterweight	Jul 23, 2016	Viktor Postol	UD 12/12
48	Terence Crawford	**IBF** Light welterweight	Aug 19, 2017	Julius Indongo	KO 3/12
48	Terence Crawford	**WBA** (Super) Light welterweight	Aug 19, 2017	Julius Indongo	KO 3/12
48	Terence Crawford	**WBO** Welterweight	**Jun 9, 2018**	Jeff Horn	TKO 9/12
48	Terence Crawford	**WBA** (Super) Welterweight	Jul 29, 2023	Errol Spence Jr.	TKO 9/12
48	Terence Crawford	**WBC** Welterweight	Jul 29, 2023	Errol Spence Jr.	TKO 9/12
48	Terence Crawford	**IBF** Welterweight	Jul 29, 2023	Errol Spence Jr.	TKO 9/12
48	Terence Crawford	**The Ring** Welterweight	Jul 29, 2023	Errol Spence Jr.	TKO 9/12
49	Kosei Tanaka	**WBO** Mini flyweight	May 30, 2015	Julian Yedras	UD 12/12
49	Kosei Tanaka	**WBO** Light flyweight	Dec 31, 2016	Moisés Fuentes	TKO 5/12
49	Kosei Tanaka	**WBO** Flyweight	**Sep 24, 2018**	Sho Kimura	MD 12/12
50	Naoya Inoue	**WBC** Light flyweight	Apr 6, 2014	Adrián Hernández	KO 6/12
50	Naoya Inoue	**WBO** Super flyweight	Dec 30, 2014	Omar Narváez	KO 2/12
50	Naoya Inoue	**IBF** Bantamweight	**May 18, 2019**	Emmanuel Rodríguez	KO 2/12
50	Naoya Inoue	**The Ring** Bantamweight	**May 18, 2019**	Emmanuel Rodríguez	KO 2/12
50	Naoya Inoue	**WBA** (Super) Bantamweight	Nov 7, 2019	Nonito Donaire	UD 12/12
50	Naoya Inoue	**WBC** Bantamweight	Jun 7, 2022	Nonito Donaire	TKO 2/12
50	Naoya Inoue	**WBO** Bantamweight	Dec 13, 2022	Paul Butler	KO 11/12
51	Canelo Álvarez	**WBC** Light middleweight	Mar 5, 2011	Matthew Hatton	UD 12/12
51	Canelo Álvarez	**The Ring** Light middleweight	Apr 20, 2013	Austin Trout	UD 12/12
51	Canelo Álvarez	**WBC** Middleweight	Nov 21, 2015	Miguel Cotto	UD 12/12
51	Canelo Álvarez	**The Ring** Middleweight	Nov 21, 2015	Miguel Cotto	UD 12/12
51	Canelo Álvarez	**WBO** Light middleweight	Sep 17, 2016	Liam Smith	KO 9/12
51	Canelo Álvarez	**WBA** (Super) Middleweight	Sep 15, 2018	Gennady Golovkin	MD 12/12
51	Canelo Álvarez	**WBC** Middleweight – (**2**)	Sep 15, 2018	Gennady Golovkin	MD 12/12
51	Canelo Álvarez	**The Ring** Middleweight – (**2**)	Sep 15, 2018	Gennady Golovkin	MD 12/12
51	Canelo Álvarez	**IBF** Middleweight	May 4, 2019	Daniel Jacobs	UD 12/12
51	Canelo Álvarez	**WBO** Light heavyweight	**Nov 2, 2019**	Sergey Kovalev	KO 11/12
52	John Riel Casimero	**IBF** Light flyweight	Jul 20, 2012	**Interim promoted**	
52	John Riel Casimero	**IBF** Flyweight	May 25, 2016	Amnat Ruenroeng	KO 4/12
52	John Riel Casimero	**WBO** Bantamweight	**Nov 30, 2019**	Zolani Tete	TKO 3/12
53	Emanuel Navarrete				
53	Emanuel Navarrete	**WBO** Super bantamweight	Dec 8, 2018	Isaac Dogboe	TKO 12/12
53	Emanuel Navarrete	**WBO** Featherweight	Oct 9, 2020	Ruben Villa	UD 12/12
53	Emanuel Navarrete	**WBO** Super featherweight	**Feb 3, 2023**	Liam Wilson	TKO 9/12
53	Emanuel Navarrete	**IBF** Super featherweight	Feb 28, 2026	Eduardo Núñez	TKO 11/12
54	Badou Jack	**WBC** Super middleweight	Apr 24, 2015	Anthony Dirrell	MD 12/12
54	Badou Jack	**WBA** (Regular^{‡}) Light heavyweight	Sep 21, 2017	**Primary champion vacant**	
54	Badou Jack	**WBC** Cruiserweight	**Feb 26, 2023**	Ilunga Makabu	TKO 12/12
54	Badou Jack	**WBC** Cruiserweight – (**2**)	Dec 11, 2024	**Champion in recess reinstated**	
55	Shakur Stevenson				
55	Shakur Stevenson	**WBO** Featherweight	Oct 26, 2019	Joet Gonzalez	UD 12/12
55	Shakur Stevenson	**WBO** Super featherweight	Oct 23, 2021	Jamel Herring	TKO 10/12
55	Shakur Stevenson	**WBC** Super featherweight	Apr 30, 2022	Óscar Valdez	UD 12/12
55	Shakur Stevenson	**The Ring** Super featherweight	Apr 30, 2022	Óscar Valdez	UD 12/12
55	Shakur Stevenson	**WBC** Lightweight	**Nov 16, 2023**	Edwin De Los Santos	UD 12/12
56	Junto Nakatani	**WBO** Flyweight	Nov 6, 2020	Giemel Magramo	TKO 8/12
56	Junto Nakatani	**WBO** Super flyweight	May 20, 2023	Andrew Moloney	KO 12/12
56	Junto Nakatani	**WBC** Bantamweight	**Feb 24, 2024**	Alexandro Santiago	TKO 6/12
56	Junto Nakatani	**IBF** Bantamweight	Jun 8, 2025	Ryosuke Nishida	RTD 6/12
56	Junto Nakatani	**The Ring** Bantamweight	Jun 8, 2025	Ryosuke Nishida	RTD 6/12
57	Devin Haney	**WBC** Lightweight	Oct 23, 2019	**Interim promoted**	
57	Devin Haney	**WBC** Lightweight – (**2**)	Apr 22, 2020	**Champion in recess reinstated**	
57	Devin Haney	**WBA** (Super) Lightweight	Jun 5, 2022	George Kambosos Jr.	UD 12/12
57	Devin Haney	**IBF** Lightweight	Jun 5, 2022	George Kambosos Jr.	UD 12/12
57	Devin Haney	**WBO** Lightweight	Jun 5, 2022	George Kambosos Jr.	UD 12/12
57	Devin Haney	**The Ring** Lightweight	Jun 5, 2022	George Kambosos Jr.	UD 12/12
57	Devin Haney	**WBC** Light welterweight	Dec 9, 2023	Regis Prograis	UD 12/12
57	Devin Haney	**WBO** Welterweight	**Nov 22, 2025**	Brian Norman Jr.	UD 12/12
58	David Benavidez	**WBC** Super middleweight	Sep 8, 2017	Ronald Gavril	SD 12/12
58	David Benavidez	**WBC** Super middleweight – (**2**)	Sep 28, 2019	Anthony Dirrell	TKO 9/12
58	David Benavidez	**WBC** Light heavyweight	Apr 7, 2025	**Interim promoted**	
58	David Benavidez	**WBA** (Super) Cruiserweight	**May 2, 2026**	Gilberto Ramírez	KO 6/12
58	David Benavidez	**WBO** Cruiserweight	**May 2, 2026**	Gilberto Ramírez	KO 6/12
59	Jesse Rodriguez	**WBC** Super flyweight	Feb 5, 2022	Carlos Cuadras	UD 12/12
59	Jesse Rodriguez	**WBO** Flyweight	Apr 8, 2023	Cristian Gonzalez	UD 12/12
59	Jesse Rodriguez	**IBF** Flyweight	Dec 16, 2023	Sunny Edwards	RTD 9/12
59	Jesse Rodriguez	**WBC** Super flyweight – (**2**)	Jun 29, 2024	Juan Francisco Estrada	KO 7/12
59	Jesse Rodriguez	**The Ring** Super flyweight	Jun 29, 2024	Juan Francisco Estrada	KO 7/12
59	Jesse Rodriguez	**WBO** Super flyweight	Jul 19, 2025	Phumelele Cafu	TKO 10/12
59	Jesse Rodriguez	**WBA** Super flyweight	Nov 22, 2025	Fernando Martínez	KO 10/12
59	Jesse Rodriguez	**WBA** Bantamweight	**Jun 13, 2026**	Antonio Vargas	TKO 6/12
59	Jesse Rodriguez	**WBA** Bantamweight	Super; Jul 10, 2026	**Regular**^{‡} **promoted**	
60	Kenshiro Teraji	**WBC** Light flyweight	May 20, 2017	Ganigan López	MD 12/12
60	Kenshiro Teraji	**WBC** Light flyweight – (**2**)	Mar 19, 2022	Masamichi Yabuki	KO 3/12
60	Kenshiro Teraji	**WBA** Light flyweight	Super Nov 1, 2022	Hiroto Kyoguchi	TKO 7/12
60	Kenshiro Teraji	**WBA** Light flyweight	Unified; Nov 30, 2022	**Status changed**	
60	Kenshiro Teraji	**The Ring** Light flyweight	Nov 1, 2022	Hiroto Kyoguchi	TKO 7/12
60	Kenshiro Teraji	**WBC** Flyweight	Oct 13, 2024	Cristofer Rosales	TKO 11/12
60	Kenshiro Teraji	**WBA** Flyweight	Mar 13, 2025	Seigo Yuri Akui	TKO 12/12
60	Kenshiro Teraji	**WBO** Super flyweight	**Jul 20, 2026**	Israel González	UD 12/12
61	Teofimo Lopez				
61	Teofimo Lopez	**IBF** Lightweight	Dec 14, 2019	Richard Commey	TKO 2/12
61	Teofimo Lopez	**WBA** (Super) Lightweight	Oct 17, 2020	Vasiliy Lomachenko	UD 12/12
61	Teofimo Lopez	**WBO** Lightweight	Oct 17, 2020	Vasiliy Lomachenko	UD 12/12
61	Teofimo Lopez	**The Ring** Lightweight	Oct 17, 2020	Vasiliy Lomachenko	UD 12/12
61	Teofimo Lopez	**WBO** Light welterweight	Jun 20, 2023	Josh Taylor	UD 12/12
61	Teofimo Lopez	**The Ring** Light welterweight	Jun 20, 2023	Josh Taylor	UD 12/12
61	Teofimo Lopez	**WBA** (Super) Welterweight	**Aug 22, 2026**	Rolando Romero	MD 12/12

=== Note ===
- Dates in bold format signify the date when they won their 3rd division title.
- Interim titles are not included unless it gets promoted to the official title.
- Any **WBA** titles won before the titles are fragmented in the division are not marked as Super, Undisputed, Unified, or Regular.
- In August 2021, the WBA has started recognizing a single champion per division as part of their title reduction plan. World titles won after the plan will not be marked as Regular.

== List of women's triple champions ==
The following is a list of women's triple champions who have held titles from one or more of the "Big Four" organizations (WBA, WBC, IBF, WBO) and The Ring.

World titles from The Ring

No.	Name	Titles	Date	Opponent	Result
1	Alejandra Oliveras	**WBC** Super bantamweight	May 20, 2006	Jackie Nava	KO 8/10
1	Alejandra Oliveras	**WBA** Lightweight	Aug 12, 2011	Liliana Palmera	RTD 5/10
1	Alejandra Oliveras	**WBO** Featherweight	**Jan 5, 2012**	Jessica Villafranca	KO 5/10
2	Naoko Fujioka	**WBC** Mini flyweight	May 8, 2011	Anabel Ortiz	RTD 8/10
2	Naoko Fujioka	**WBA** Super flyweight	Nov 13, 2013	Naoko Yamaguchi	UD 10/10
2	Naoko Fujioka	**WBO** Bantamweight	**Oct 19, 2015**	Hee Jung Yuh	UD 10/10
3	Amanda Serrano	**IBF** Super featherweight	Sep 10, 2011	Kimberly Connor	TKO 2/10
3	Amanda Serrano	**WBO** Lightweight	Aug 15, 2014	Maria Elena Maderna	KO 6/10
3	Amanda Serrano	**WBO** Featherweight	**Feb 17, 2016**	Olivia Gerula	TKO 1/10
3	Amanda Serrano	**WBO** Featherweight – (**2**)	Sep 13, 2019	Heather Hardy	UD 10/10
3	Amanda Serrano	**WBC** Featherweight	Feb 4, 2021	**Interim promoted**	
3	Amanda Serrano	**IBF** Featherweight	Sep 24, 2022	Sarah Mahfoud	UD 10/10
3	Amanda Serrano	**The Ring** Featherweight	Sep 24, 2022	Sarah Mahfoud	UD 10/10
3	Amanda Serrano	**WBA** Featherweight	Feb 4, 2023	Erika Cruz	UD 10/10
4	Daniela Romina Bermúdez	**WBO** Bantamweight	May 31, 2013	Neisi Torres	TKO 1/10
4	Daniela Romina Bermúdez	**WBO** Super flyweight	Jan 4, 2014	Linda Laura Lecca	TKO 8/10
4	Daniela Romina Bermúdez	**WBO** Bantamweight – (**2**)	Oct 20, 2017	Soledad del Valle Frias	UD 10/10
4	Daniela Romina Bermúdez	**IBF** Super bantamweight	**Apr 13, 2018**	Marcela Acuña	UD 10/10
4	Daniela Romina Bermúdez	**IBF** Super bantamweight – (**2**)	Dec 4, 2020	Cintia Gisela Castillo	TKO 10/10
5	Yazmín Rivas	**WBA** Super flyweight	Feb 28, 2005	Lucia Avalos	UD 10/10
5	Yazmín Rivas	**IBF** Bantamweight	Oct 15, 2011	Susie Ramadan	SD 10/10
5	Yazmín Rivas	**WBC** Bantamweight	Jun 28, 2014	Alesia Graf	UD 10/10
5	Yazmín Rivas	**WBA** Super bantamweight	**May 19, 2018**	Liliana Palmera	TKO 5/10
6	Anahí Ester Sánchez	**IBF** Super featherweight	Mar 19, 2016	Areti Mastrosdouka	RTD 5/10
6	Anahí Ester Sánchez	**WBA** Lightweight	Sep 9, 2017	Cecilia Sofia Mena	TKO 6/10
6	Anahí Ester Sánchez	**WBA** Light welterweight	**Feb 28, 2019**	**Interim promoted**	
7	Claressa Shields	**IBF** Super middleweight	Aug 4, 2017	Nikki Adler	TKO 5/10
7	Claressa Shields	**WBC** Super middleweight	Aug 4, 2017	Nikki Adler	TKO 5/10
7	Claressa Shields	**IBF** Middleweight	Jun 22, 2018	Hanna Gabriel	UD 10/10
7	Claressa Shields	**WBA** Middleweight	Jun 22, 2018	Hanna Gabriel	UD 10/10
7	Claressa Shields	**WBC** Middleweight	Nov 17, 2018	Hannah Rankin	UD 10/10
7	Claressa Shields	**WBO** Middleweight	Apr 13, 2019	Christina Hammer	UD 10/10
7	Claressa Shields	**The Ring** Middleweight	Apr 13, 2019	Christina Hammer	UD 10/10
7	Claressa Shields	**WBC** Light middleweight	**Jan 10, 2020**	Ivana Habazin	UD 10/10
7	Claressa Shields	**WBO** Light middleweight	**Jan 10, 2020**	Ivana Habazin	UD 10/10
7	Claressa Shields	**IBF** Light middleweight	Mar 5, 2021	Marie-Eve Dicaire	UD 10/10
7	Claressa Shields	**WBA** (Super) Light middleweight	Mar 5, 2021	Marie-Eve Dicaire	UD 10/10
7	Claressa Shields	**The Ring** Light middleweight	Mar 5, 2021	Marie-Eve Dicaire	UD 10/10
7	Claressa Shields	**WBO** Middleweight – (**2**)	Oct 15, 2022	Savannah Marshall	UD 10/10
7	Claressa Shields	**WBA** Middleweight – (**2**)	Aug 16, 2026	Kaye Scott	TKO 6/10
7	Claressa Shields	**WBC** Middleweight – (**2**)	Aug 16, 2026	Kaye Scott	TKO 6/10
8	Hanna Gabriels	**WBO** Welterweight	Dec 19, 2009	Gabriela Marcela Zapata	KO 4/10
8	Hanna Gabriels	**WBO** Light middleweight	May 29, 2010	Gardy Pena Alvarez	TKO 1/10
8	Hanna Gabriels	**WBO** Light middleweight – (**2**)	Dec 20, 2014	Paty Ramirez	TKO 2/10
8	Hanna Gabriels	**WBA** Light middleweight	Jun 18, 2016	Katia Alvariño	TKO 3/10
8	Hanna Gabriels	**WBA** Light heavyweight	**Apr 17, 2021**	Martha Gaytán	TKO 2/10
9	Yokasta Valle	**IBF** Atomweight	Dec 16, 2016	Ana Victoria Polo	SD 10/10
9	Yokasta Valle	**IBF** Mini flyweight	Aug 4, 2019	Joana Pastrana	SD 10/10
9	Yokasta Valle	**WBO** Mini flyweight	Sep 8, 2022	Nguyễn Thị Thu Nhi	UD 10/10
9	Yokasta Valle	**IBF** Light flyweight	**Nov 26, 2022**	Evelyn Nazarena Bermúdez	UD 10/10
9	Yokasta Valle	**WBO** Light flyweight	**Nov 26, 2022**	Evelyn Nazarena Bermúdez	UD 10/10
9	Yokasta Valle	**WBC** Mini flyweight	Nov 1, 2024	Elizabeth Lopez Corzo	UD 10/10
10	Terri Harper	**WBC** Super featherweight	Feb 8, 2020	Eva Wahlström	UD 10/10
10	Terri Harper	**WBA** Light middleweight	Sep 24, 2022	Hannah Rankin	UD 10/10
10	Terri Harper	**WBO** Lightweight	**Sep 28, 2024**	Rhiannon Dixon	UD 10/10
11	Mikaela Mayer	**WBO** Super featherweight	Oct 31, 2020	Ewa Brodnicka	UD 10/10
11	Mikaela Mayer	**IBF** Super featherweight	Nov 5, 2021	Maïva Hamadouche	UD 10/10
11	Mikaela Mayer	**The Ring** Super featherweight	Nov 5, 2021	Maïva Hamadouche	UD 10/10
11	Mikaela Mayer	**WBO** Welterweight	Sep 27, 2024	Sandy Ryan	MD 10/10
11	Mikaela Mayer	**WBA** Light middleweight	**Oct 30, 2025**	Mary Spencer	UD 10/10
11	Mikaela Mayer	**WBC** Light middleweight	**Oct 30, 2025**	Mary Spencer	UD 10/10
11	Mikaela Mayer	**WBO** Light middleweight	**Oct 30, 2025**	Mary Spencer	UD 10/10
12	Lani Daniels	**IBF** Heavyweight	May 27, 2023	Alrie Meleisea	UD 10/10
12	Lani Daniels	**IBF** Light heavyweight	Dec 2, 2023	Desley Robinson	MD 10/10
12	Lani Daniels	**IBF** Super middleweight	**Apr 17, 2026**	Shadasia Green	TKO 9/10
12	Lani Daniels	**WBO** Super middleweight	**Apr 17, 2026**	Shadasia Green	TKO 9/10
12	Lani Daniels	**The Ring** Super middleweight	**Apr 17, 2026**	Shadasia Green	TKO 9/10

=== Note ===
- Dates in bold format signify the date when they won their 3rd division title.
- Interim titles are not included unless they get promoted to the official champion.

== List of triple champions in the original eight weight classes ==
This exclusive list features boxers that are triple champions based on the original eight weight classes. A feat where only a few boxers have achieved. The Original Eight weight classes are as follows:

- Flyweight
- Bantamweight
- Featherweight
- Lightweight
- Welterweight
- Middleweight
- Light heavyweight
- Heavyweight

Inducted into the International Boxing Hall of Fame
World Titles from World and The Ring

=== Men's Boxing ===
No.	Name	Titles	Date	Opponent	Result
1	Bob Fitzsimmons	**World** Middleweight	Jan 14, 1891	Nonpareil Dempsey	RTD 13/?
1	Bob Fitzsimmons	**World** Heavyweight	Mar 17, 1897	James J. Corbett	KO 14/25
1	Bob Fitzsimmons	**World** Light heavyweight	**Nov 25, 1903**	George Gardiner	PTS 20/20
2	Henry Armstrong	**NYSAC** Featherweight	Oct 24, 1937	Petey Sarron	KO 6/15
2	Henry Armstrong	**NBA** Featherweight	Oct 24, 1937	Petey Sarron	KO 6/15
2	Henry Armstrong	**The Ring** Featherweight	Oct 24, 1937	Petey Sarron	KO 6/15
2	Henry Armstrong	**NYSAC** Welterweight	May 31, 1938	Barney Ross	UD 15/15
2	Henry Armstrong	**NBA** Welterweight	May 31, 1938	Barney Ross	UD 15/15
2	Henry Armstrong	**The Ring** Welterweight	May 31, 1938	Barney Ross	UD 15/15
2	Henry Armstrong	**NYSAC** Lightweight	**Aug 17, 1938**	Lou Ambers	SD 15/15
2	Henry Armstrong	**NBA** Lightweight	**Aug 17, 1938**	Lou Ambers	SD 15/15
2	Henry Armstrong	**The Ring** Lightweight	**Aug 17, 1938**	Lou Ambers	SD 15/15
3	Thomas Hearns	**WBA** Welterweight	Aug 2, 1980	Pipino Cuevas	TKO 2/15
3	Thomas Hearns	**WBC** Light heavyweight	Mar 7, 1987	Dennis Andries	TKO 10/12
3	Thomas Hearns	**WBC** Middleweight	**Oct 29, 1987**	Juan Domingo Roldán	KO 4/12
3	Thomas Hearns	**WBA** Light heavyweight	Jun 3, 1991	Virgil Hill	UD 12/12
4	Sugar Ray Leonard	**WBC** Welterweight	Nov 30, 1979	Wilfred Benítez	TKO 15/15
4	Sugar Ray Leonard	**The Ring** Welterweight	Nov 30, 1979	Wilfred Benítez	TKO 15/15
4	Sugar Ray Leonard	**WBC** Welterweight – (**2**)	Nov 25, 1980	Roberto Durán	TKO 8/15
4	Sugar Ray Leonard	**The Ring** Welterweight – (**2**)	Nov 25, 1980	Roberto Durán	TKO 8/15
4	Sugar Ray Leonard	**WBA** Welterweight	Sep 16, 1981	Thomas Hearns	TKO 14/15
4	Sugar Ray Leonard	**WBC** Middleweight	Apr 6, 1987	Marvin Hagler	SD 12/12
4	Sugar Ray Leonard	**The Ring** Middleweight	Apr 6, 1987	Marvin Hagler	SD 12/12
4	Sugar Ray Leonard	**WBC** Light heavyweight	**Nov 7, 1988**	Don Lalonde	TKO 9/12
5	Roberto Durán	**WBA** Lightweight	Jun 26, 1972	Ken Buchanan	TKO 13/15
5	Roberto Durán	**The Ring** Lightweight	Jun 26, 1972	Ken Buchanan	TKO 13/15
5	Roberto Durán	**WBC** Lightweight	Jan 21, 1978	Esteban de Jesús	TKO 12/15
5	Roberto Durán	**WBC** Welterweight	Jun 20, 1980	Sugar Ray Leonard	UD 15/15
5	Roberto Durán	**The Ring** Welterweight	Jun 20, 1980	Sugar Ray Leonard	UD 15/15
5	Roberto Durán	**WBC** Middleweight	**Feb 24, 1989**	Iran Barkley	SD 12/12
6	Roy Jones Jr.	**IBF** Middleweight	May 22, 1993	Bernard Hopkins	UD 12/12
6	Roy Jones Jr.	**WBC** Light heavyweight	Jan 13, 1997	**Interim promoted**	
6	Roy Jones Jr.	**WBC** Light heavyweight – (**2**)	Aug 7, 1997	Montell Griffin	KO 1/12
6	Roy Jones Jr.	**WBC** Light heavyweight – (**3**)	Jun 1998	**Reinstated**	
6	Roy Jones Jr.	**WBA** Light heavyweight, later promoted to inaugural Super champion; Status changed to Unified champion on WBA's official rankings.	Jul 18, 1998	Lou Del Valle	UD 12/12
6	Roy Jones Jr.	**WBA** Light heavyweight, later promoted to inaugural Super champion; Status changed to Unified champion on WBA's official rankings.	Super; Dec 2000	Lou Del Valle	UD 12/12
6	Roy Jones Jr.	**WBA** Light heavyweight, later promoted to inaugural Super champion; Status changed to Unified champion on WBA's official rankings.	Unified; Aug 5, 2002	Lou Del Valle	UD 12/12
6	Roy Jones Jr.	**IBF** Light heavyweight	Jun 5, 1999	Reggie Johnson	UD 12/12
6	Roy Jones Jr.	**The Ring** Light heavyweight	Dec 2, 2001	**Awarded**	
6	Roy Jones Jr.	**WBA** Heavyweight	**Mar 1, 2003**	John Ruiz	UD 12/12
6	Roy Jones Jr.	**WBA** (Unified) Light heavyweight – (**2**)	Nov 8, 2003	Antonio Tarver	UD 12/12
6	Roy Jones Jr.	**WBC** Light heavyweight – (**4**)	Nov 8, 2003	Antonio Tarver	UD 12/12
7	Oscar De La Hoya	**WBO** Lightweight	Feb 18, 1995	John-John Molina	UD 12/12
7	Oscar De La Hoya	**IBF** Lightweight	May 6, 1995	Rafael Ruelas	TKO 2/12
7	Oscar De La Hoya	**WBC** Welterweight	Apr 12, 1997	Pernell Whitaker	UD 12/12
7	Oscar De La Hoya	**WBC** Welterweight – (**2**)	Mar 21, 2000	**No. 1 contender promoted**	
7	Oscar De La Hoya	**WBO** Middleweight	**Jun 5, 2004**	Felix Sturm	UD 12/12
8	Manny Pacquiao	**WBC** Flyweight	Dec 4, 1998	Chatchai Sasakul	KO 8/12
8	Manny Pacquiao	**The Ring** Featherweight	Nov 15, 2003	Marco Antonio Barrera	TKO 11/12
8	Manny Pacquiao	**WBC** Lightweight	**Jun 28, 2008**	David Díaz	TKO 9/12
9	Nonito Donaire	**IBF** Flyweight	Jul 7, 2007	Vic Darchinyan	TKO 5/12
9	Nonito Donaire	**WBC** Bantamweight	Feb 19, 2011	Fernando Montiel	KO 2/12
9	Nonito Donaire	**WBO** Bantamweight	Feb 19, 2011	Fernando Montiel	KO 2/12
9	Nonito Donaire	**WBA** (Undisputed) Featherweight	**May 31, 2014**	Simpiwe Vetyeka	TD 5/12
9	Nonito Donaire	**WBA** (Super) Bantamweight	Nov 3, 2018	Ryan Burnett	RTD 4/12
9	Nonito Donaire	**WBC** Bantamweight – (**2**)	May 29, 2021	Nordine Oubaali	KO 4/12

=== Women's Boxing ===
No.	Name	Titles	Date	Opponent	Result
1	Amanda Serrano	**WBO** Lightweight	Aug 15, 2014	Maria Elena Maderna	KO 6/10
1	Amanda Serrano	**WBO** Featherweight	Feb 17, 2016	Olivia Gerula	TKO 1/10
1	Amanda Serrano	**WBO** Bantamweight	**Apr 22, 2017**	Dahiana Santana	TKO 8/10
1	Amanda Serrano	**WBO** Featherweight – (**2**)	Sep 13, 2019	Heather Hardy	UD 10/10
1	Amanda Serrano	**WBC** Featherweight	Feb 4, 2021	**Interim promoted**	
1	Amanda Serrano	**IBF** Featherweight	Sep 24, 2022	Sarah Mahfoud	UD 10/10
1	Amanda Serrano	**The Ring** Featherweight	Sep 24, 2022	Sarah Mahfoud	UD 10/10
1	Amanda Serrano	**WBA** Featherweight	Feb 4, 2023	Erika Cruz	UD 10/10
2	Hanna Gabriels	**WBO** Welterweight	Dec 19, 2009	Gabriela Marcela Zapata	KO 4/10
2	Hanna Gabriels	**WBA** Light heavyweight	**Apr 17, 2021**	Martha Gaytán	TKO 2/10
2	Hanna Gabriels	**WBC** Heavyweight	**Apr 17, 2021**	Martha Gaytán	TKO 2/10
3	Claressa Shields				
3	Claressa Shields	**IBF** Middleweight	Jun 22, 2018	Hanna Gabriel	UD 10/10
3	Claressa Shields	**WBA** Middleweight	Jun 22, 2018	Hanna Gabriel	UD 10/10
3	Claressa Shields	**WBC** Middleweight	Nov 17, 2018	Hannah Rankin	UD 10/10
3	Claressa Shields	**WBO** Middleweight	Apr 13, 2019	Christina Hammer	UD 10/10
3	Claressa Shields	**The Ring** Middleweight	Apr 13, 2019	Christina Hammer	UD 10/10
3	Claressa Shields	**WBO** Middleweight – (**2**)	Oct 15, 2022	Savannah Marshall	UD 10/10
3	Claressa Shields	**WBO** Light heavyweight	**Jul 27, 2024**	Vanessa Lepage-Joanisse	TKO 2/10
3	Claressa Shields	**WBC** Heavyweight	**Jul 27, 2024**	Vanessa Lepage-Joanisse	TKO 2/10
3	Claressa Shields	**WBA** Heavyweight	Feb 2, 2025	Danielle Perkins	UD 10/10
3	Claressa Shields	**IBF** Heavyweight	Feb 2, 2025	Danielle Perkins	UD 10/10
3	Claressa Shields	**WBO** Heavyweight	Feb 2, 2025	Danielle Perkins	UD 10/10

==== Note ====
- Dates in bold format signify the date when they won their 3rd division title.

== See also ==
- List of current world boxing champions
- List of boxing quadruple champions
- List of boxing quintuple champions
- List of boxing sextuple champions
- List of boxing septuple champions
- Octuple champion
- List of WBA world champions
- List of WBC world champions
- List of IBF world champions
- List of WBO world champions
- List of The Ring world champions
- List of undisputed world boxing champions

== Other references ==
1. Bob Fitsimmons:Boxing's First Triple World Champion
2. Bob Fitzsimmons's article
3. Henry Armstrong
4. Tony Canzoneri
5. Alexis Argüello, The Explosive Thin Man...
6. The iron men of boxing
7. Manny Pacquiao
