= Tommy Morrison vs. Tim Tomashek =

Boxing match

Bringing It Home
- Date: August 30, 1993
- Venue: Kemper Arena, Kansas City, Missouri, U.S.
- Title on the line: WBO heavyweight title

Tale of the tape
Boxer	Tommy Morrison	Tim Tomashek
Nickname	The Duke	The Doughboy
Hometown	Jay, Oklahoma, U.S.	Green Bay, Wisconsin, U.S.
Purse	$100,000	$42,500
Pre-fight record	37–1 (32 KO)	35–10 (11 KO)
Age	24 years, 7 months	28 years
Height	6 ft 2 in (188 cm)	6 ft 0 in (183 cm)
Weight	226 lb (103 kg)	205 lb (93 kg)
Style	Orthodox	Orthodox
Recognition	WBO; Heavyweight Champion; The Ring; No. 4 Ranked Heavyweight	

Result
- Morrison wins via 4th-round RTD

Tommy Morrison vs. Tim Tomashek, billed as Bringing It Home, was a professional boxing match contested on August 30, 1993, for the WBO heavyweight world title. Morrison's original opponent Mike Williams, who had appeared opposite Morrison in the film Rocky V, withdrew from the fight only 90 minutes before it was scheduled to take place. Rather than cancel the event, the promoters of the event selected journeyman Tim Tomashek as a last minute replacement.

== Background ==
On June 7, 1993, Tommy Morrison defeated George Foreman by unanimous decision to capture the vacant WBO heavyweight world title. For his first title defense, Morrison was matched up against Mike Williams, whom had co-starred with Morrison in Rocky V. In the film, Morrison's character Tommy Gunn defeated Williams character Union Cane to capture the heavyweight championship. Though Williams sported a fairly impressive 21–3 record, he was not regarded as top heavyweight contender as most of his wins had come against marginal competition, aside from a sole notable knockout win over former title challenger James Tillis, and his three losses had come when he stepped up in class (despite this he still became ranked number eight in WBO rankings). Nevertheless, Morrison and Williams' appearance in Rocky V added some luster and intrigue to the fight and sports giant ESPN decided to broadcast the bout nationally and powerful boxing promoter Bob Arum's Top Rank handled promotional duties. Morrison was taking a risk, as he had already agreed in principle to an $8,000,000 deal to face WBC heavyweight champion Lennox Lewis. Williams' manager Bob Jordan criticized Morrison's decision to fight despite having secured a lucrative title shot stating "I think Tommy's people made a terrible mistake. He has a tremendous amount to lose if we win this fight. We have nothing to lose and everything to gain."

Concern arose when Williams no-showed a pre-fight press conference, leading to Arum, whom did not want to jeopardize the event, to bring in Tomashek as a precaution should Williams be unable or unwilling to face Morrison come fight time. Williams did in fact arrive to venue, but around 90 minutes before the main event was to begin, Williams decided not to submit a mandatory pre-fight drug test and remained in his limousine, effectively withdrawing from the fight. Williams initially said that a back injury was the reason why he would not fight, but two physicians found no signs of injury and his manager Jordan rebuked Williams' injury claim stating to the media "The official word is Mike turned yellow and left. He said he pulled a muscle in his back. We had two doctors check him out and they could not find an injury. His wife said there's nothing wrong with him." Williams, whom eventually returned to the arena to watch the fight, refused to answer questions as to why he pulled out but denied a drug test was the cause simply stating "Don't even bring that up. I don't do drugs." Arum had, after demands from Williams, increased his $17,500 purse to $30,000 plus $12,500 addition for expenses, but Williams still refused to fight.

Tomashek, whom had been watching the undercard in the audience as a spectator, was then summoned and informed that he would indeed face Morrison. Before this, Tomashek had consumed concession stand food and had drunken a few pints of beer. Arum announced Williams withdrawal to the live audience and informed them that a full refund would be available to those that wanted it. Tomashek had been working at a Shopko distribution center at the time and when asked what he did to train for the fight joked "They beat me up at work. That was my training for this fight." Tomashek had been paid $2,500 just to show up to the event as the back up fighter. After he indeed stepped up to face Morrison, Tomashek received an increase in pay to a $40,000 purse.

== The fight ==
A game but clearly outmatched Tomashek managed to last four rounds and absorb several powerful combinations from the superior opponent. Tomashek tried to engage Morrison with jabs, but took a lot of punishment from the bigger and stronger Morrison. Tomashek still gave a good account of himself and proved that, despite being a journeyman, he was not a pushover. Morrison landed punches almost at will and dropped Tomashek towards the end of the fourth round after landing a series of left hooks and uppercuts. Though Tomashek answered the referee's 10-count and survived the round, his nose was bloodied and both eyes were nearly swollen shut and his corner decided not to let him go out for the fifth round. Though Tomashek insisted he could continue, the fight was stopped and Morrison was named the winner by referee technical decision.

== Aftermath ==
Morrison expressed disappointment in the fight claiming he did not know Tomashek (whom he referred to as "whatshisname" in a post-fight interview) had replaced Williams until he had entered the ring. Arum promised to media that Williams was "finished" and that boxing commissions would "suspend him for life." Williams did return to boxing that August, but fought extremely sporadically thereafter, fighting only four more times from 1994 to 2000.

Tomashek, due to his unlikely path to a world title fight, became a minor overnight sensation following his performance against Morrison, which some ironically likened to the first Rocky film. Tomashek joked to the media after the fight "It's like a movie, but I ain't Rocky. I'm uglier" and admitted that the opportunity to challenge Morrison was too good to pass up stating "I'm excited as heck. There's a million guys out there who would jump at this chance." Days after fight, Tomashek appeared as a guest on the Late Show with David Letterman in which he infamously uttered the word "jeepers" a dozen times. Tomashek was also offered an opportunity Live with Regis and Kathie Lee, but turned down the offer. The following year Team Tulsa, Morrison's promotional firm, invited Tomashek to appear on the undercard of Team Tulsa member Iran Barkley fight with Gary Butler, which Tomashek accepted, knocking out his opponent Paul Presley in the third round.

== WBO Sanctioning ==
There was some controversy regarding the fact that the WBO had sanctioned a heavyweight title fight featuring an unranked replacement opponent. Dr. Elias Ghanem, the then-chairman of Nevada State Athletic Commission wrote a letter to the WBO expressing his dissatisfaction with the fight, calling it a "farce" while also writing that "No promoter, no television network, no manager could have pressured us into approving that fight." The commission's executive director Marc Ratner also expressed disappointment telling the New York Times "For boxing's sake, last Monday's fight never should have happened. This W.B.O. is a group that wants recognition. We're very unhappy that it would sanction a last-minute fighter as a title fight." After weeks of pressure from the NSAC, the WBO finally relented and they held a vote in which their committee unanimously declared that the WBO heavyweight title was not on the line and the Morrison–Tomashek fight was changed to a non-title bout. Alberto Aleman, the WBO's chairman, reasoned that he had only approved the fight as a title fight to avoid a riot. However, Bob Arum rejected the WBO's decision and refused to take back $8,750 sanctioning fee, allowing the fight to keep its championship status.

== Fight card ==
Confirmed bouts:

Weight Class	Weight		vs.		Method	Round	Notes
Heavyweight	200+ lbs.	Tommy Morrison (c)	def	Tim Tomashek	RTD	4/12	^{Note 1}
Lightweight	135 lbs.	Regilio Tuur	def.	Tommy Parks	PTS	10/10
Cruiserweight	190 lbs.	Iran Barkley	def.	Dino Stewart	TKO	9/10
Heavyweight	200+ lbs.	Kirk Johnson	def.	Ed Donaldson	KO	5/6

^Note 1 For WBO heavyweight title

== Broadcasting ==
Country	Broadcaster
United States	ESPN

Preceded by vs. George Foreman	Tommy Morrison's bouts August 30, 1993	Succeeded by vs. Michael Bentt
Preceded by vs. Emory Towles	Tim Tomashek's bouts August 30, 1993	Succeeded by vs. Gary Shull
