= Iran Barkley =

American boxer (born 1960)

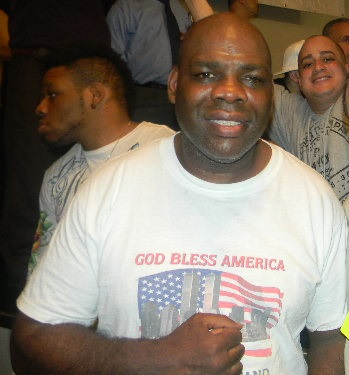
- Barkley in 2011

Personal information
- Nickname: The Blade
- Born: May 6, 1960 (age 66) New York City, U.S.
- Height: 6 ft 1 in (185 cm)
- Weight: Middleweight; Super middleweight; Light heavyweight; Heavyweight

Boxing career
- Reach: 74 in (188 cm)
- Stance: Orthodox

Boxing record
- Total fights: 63
- Wins: 43
- Win by KO: 27
- Losses: 19
- Draws: 1
Medal record
Men's amateur boxing
Representing United States
World Championships
| Bronze medal – third place | Munich 1982 | Middleweight |

Iran Barkley (/aɪˈræn/; born May 6, 1960) is an American former professional boxer who competed from 1982 to 1999. He held world championships in three weight classes, including the World Boxing Council(WBC) middleweight title from 1988 to 1989, the International Boxing Federation (IBF) super middleweight title from 1992 to 1993, and the World Boxing Association (WBA) light heavyweight title in 1992. As an amateur boxer, Barkley won a bronze medal in the middleweight division at the 1982 World Championships.

== Early life and family ==
Iran Barkley was the youngest of eight children raised in the Patterson Houses. His parents were Frank Barkley, Sr. and Georgia Barkley. He was a member of the Black Spades street gang in his youth, along with former heavyweight contender Mitch Green. Iran's sister Yvonne, who boxed professionally during the late 1970s, convinced him to start boxing when he was 13 years old, training under Bobby Miles and Connie Bryant.

He is the great-uncle of NFL running back Saquon Barkley.

== Amateur achievements ==
- 1981 – Silver Medal (165 lb) at the New York Golden Gloves, losing to Dennis Milton
- 1981 – Gold Medal (165 lb) at the Empire State Games
- 1982 – Bronze Medal (165 lb)at the Copenhagen Box Cup in Copenhagen, Denmark
- 1982 – Bronze Medal (75 kg) at the World Championships in Munich, West Germany

== Professional career ==
Known as "The Blade", Barkley turned professional in December 1982, and first challenged for a world title against the highly skilled Italian Sumbu Kalambay, losing on points over fifteen rounds for the vacant WBA middleweight title in Livorno, Toscana, Italy in October 1987.

Barkley returned in 1988 with a split decision over Sanderline Williams and a fifth-round stoppage of Michael Olajide, before winning the WBC middleweight title with a third-round knockout of Thomas Hearns, voted 1988 Upset of the Year by The Ring magazine.

In his next fight, Barkley lost his title via split decision in a 12-round war with Roberto Durán, in a fight proclaimed 1989 Fight of the Year by Ring magazine. Following the defeat to Duran, Barkley took on undefeated Michael Nunn for the IBF and lineal middleweight titles, dropping a close majority decision. He next fought Nigel Benn in a challenge for the WBO middleweight title and was stopped on the three-knockdown rule at the end of a wild first round in which both fighters were hurt.

After losing to Benn, Barkley underwent surgery for a detached retina and was inactive for a year. Barkley returned with two low-key wins at light heavyweight in 1991, then defeated Darrin Van Horn to win the IBF super middleweight title in two rounds in January 1992 in Paramount Theatre, New York. Just two months later, he went on to again defeat Hearns and take his WBA light heavyweight title via a twelve-round split decision. Barkley vacated the title without defending it, choosing instead to defend his super middleweight title against IBF and lineal middleweight champion James Toney. Barkley reportedly had trouble getting back down to the 168 lb weight limit and lost his IBF title via a corner retirement after nine rounds due to severe swelling around both eyes.

Barkley's final shot at a title would come against undefeated Henry Maske at light heavyweight for Maske's IBF title in Nordrhein-Westfalen, Germany in October 1994. Barkley again lost by corner retirement after nine rounds.

Barkley continued to fight after this loss, eventually moving up to the heavyweight division. His last fight of note was a June 1997 win for the WBB heavyweight title, a bout in which Barkley retired former WBA heavyweight champion Gerrie Coetzee with a 10th-round TKO.

Barkley 'retired' in 1999 after losing a bout in Mississippi by sixth-round stoppage to Keith McKnight.

=== Comeback ===
In 2006, at the age of 46, Barkley won an unsanctioned bout by second-round stoppage in Aruba. In 2008, at age 48, Barkley fought to a six-round draw in an unsanctioned exhibition bout against heavyweight Chauncy Welliver in Lapwai, Idaho at the Pi-Nee-Waus Community Center of the Nez Perce Tribe.

== Personal life ==
Barkley's first child was born to Barkley's common law wife Pam in 1981. He has four children and has been divorced twice.

Barkley has fallen on some difficult times since his retirement from boxing. Penniless and unemployed, he became homeless in November 2010 after he was evicted from his Bronx apartment. Through the support of the Bronx nonprofit BronxWorks and the Ring 10 boxing charity, he found housing and receives assistance so he can become self-supporting.

Barkley resides in the Morrisania area of the South Bronx.

Barkley enjoys teaching boxing skills to young amateurs.

He is a ringside regular at boxing matches in New York City.

Barkley's great-nephew, Saquon Barkley, is an NFL running back who was selected with the second pick in the 2018 NFL draft, and won NFL Offensive Player of the Year after a record-breaking 2024 season.

== Professional boxing record ==
| 63 fights | 43 wins | 19 losses |
|---|---|---|
| By knockout | 27 | 7 |
| By decision | 16 | 12 |
| Draws | 1 | |

| No. | Result | Record | Opponent | Type | Round, time | Date | Location | Notes |
|---|---|---|---|---|---|---|---|---|
| 63 | Loss | 43–19–1 | Keith McKnight | TKO | 6 (10), 2:47 | Jul 31, 1999 | Lady Luck Casino, Lula, Mississippi, U.S. | |
| 62 | Loss | 43–18–1 | Trevor Berbick | UD | 8 | Jun 29, 1999 | Molson Centre, Montreal, Quebec, Canada | |
| 61 | Loss | 43–17–1 | Tony Halme | SD | 12 | Apr 19, 1999 | Ice Hall, Helsinki, Finland | For vacant WBF (Federation) Americas heavyweight title |
| 60 | Loss | 43–16–1 | Thomas Williams | TKO | 4 | Mar 19, 1999 | Southeastern Livestock Pavilion, Ocala, Florida, U.S. | |
| 59 | Loss | 43–15–1 | Joey Guy | PTS | 10 | Jan 27, 1999 | Nashville, Tennessee, U.S. | |
| 58 | Loss | 43–14–1 | Tue Bjørn Thomsen | UD | 6 | Nov 6, 1998 | K.B. Hallen, Copenhagen, Denmark | |
| 57 | Win | 43–13–1 | Caseny Truesdale | TKO | 4 (10) | Oct 22, 1998 | Roxy Theatre, Atlanta, Georgia, U.S. | |
| 56 | Draw | 42–13–1 | Dan Kosmicki | TD | 4 (8), 1:23 | Sep 30, 1998 | Station Casino, Kansas City, Missouri, U.S. | |
| 55 | Loss | 42–13 | Tony LaRosa | UD | 10 | Aug 22, 1998 | Horizon, Rosemont, Illinois, U.S. | |
| 54 | Win | 42–12 | Marcelo Aravena | TKO | 3 | Sep 13, 1997 | Mandan, North Dakota, U.S. | |
| 53 | Win | 41–12 | Gerrie Coetzee | TKO | 10 (12), 2:07 | Jun 8, 1997 | Hollywood Palladium, Los Angeles, California, U.S. | |
| 52 | Win | 40–12 | Dave Fiddler | KO | 1 | Jan 22, 1997 | Lucky Eagle Casino, Rochester, Washington, US.. | |
| 51 | Win | 39–12 | Caseny Truesdale | TKO | 4 (6), 1:32 | Nov 20, 1996 | The Ritz, Raleigh, North Carolina, U.S. | |
| 50 | Win | 38–12 | Frankie Hines | TKO | 1 | Nov 14, 1996 | Virginia Beach, Virginia, U.S. | |
| 49 | Win | 37–12 | Dan Kosmicki | UD | 8 | Sep 6, 1996 | Casino Omaha, Onawa, Iowa, U.S. | |
| 48 | Win | 36–12 | Craig Payne | MD | 8 | Jul 27, 1996 | Lucky Eagle Casino, Rochester, Washington, U.S. | |
| 47 | Win | 35–12 | Brian Yates | UD | 8 | Jun 3, 1996 | Marriott Allis Plaza Hotel, Kansas City, Missouri, U.S. | |
| 46 | Win | 34–12 | James Baker | TKO | 1 (8), 1:00 | Feb 2, 1996 | Marriott Hotel, Des Moines, Iowa, U.S. | |
| 45 | Loss | 33–12 | Rocky Gannon | MD | 8 | Aug 18, 1995 | The Aladdin, Paradise, Nevada, U.S. | |
| 44 | Loss | 33–11 | Tosca Petridis | UD | 10 | May 14, 1995 | Sports and Entertainment Centre, Melbourne, Australia | |
| 43 | Loss | 33–10 | Henry Maske | RTD | 9 (12), 3:00 | Oct 8, 1994 | Gerry Weber Stadion, Halle, Germany | For IBF light heavyweight title |
| 42 | Win | 33–9 | Gary Butler | UD | 8 | Jul 22, 1994 | Brady Theater, Tulsa, Oklahoma | |
| 41 | Win | 32–9 | Rick Enis | TKO | 4 (10) | May 24, 1994 | Brady Theater, Tulsa, Oklahoma, U.S. | |
| 40 | Loss | 31–9 | Adolpho Washington | TKO | 6 (10), 0:33 | Oct 20, 1993 | Casino Magic, Bay St. Louis, Mississippi, U.S. | |
| 39 | Win | 31–8 | Dino Stewart | TKO | 9 | Aug 30, 1993 | Kemper Arena, Kansas City, Missouri, U.S. | |
| 38 | Loss | 30–8 | James Toney | RTD | 9 (12), 3:00 | Feb 13, 1993 | Caesars Palace, Paradise, Nevada, U.S. | Lost IBF super middleweight title |
| 37 | Win | 30–7 | Robert Folley | KO | 4 (10), 2:48 | Dec 5, 1992 | Etess Arena, Atlantic City, New Jersey, U.S. | |
| 36 | Win | 29–7 | Thomas Hearns | SD | 12 | Mar 20, 1992 | Caesars Palace, Paradise, Nevada, U.S. | Won WBA light heavyweight title |
| 35 | Win | 28–7 | Darrin Van Horn | TKO | 2 (12), 1:33 | Jan 10, 1992 | Paramount Theatre, New York City, New York, U.S. | Won IBF super middleweight title |
| 34 | Win | 27–7 | Jesus Castaneda | TD | 8 (10) | Oct 3, 1991 | Four Seasons Arena, Great Falls, Montana, U.S. | Unanimous TD: Castaneda cut from an accidental head clash |
| 33 | Win | 26–7 | Juan Hernandez | UD | 10 | Aug 16, 1991 | Hacienda Resort Hotel and Casino, Paradise, Nevada, U.S. | |
| 32 | Loss | 25–7 | Nigel Benn | TKO | 1 (12), 2:57 | Aug 18, 1990 | Bally's Las Vegas, Paradise, Nevada, U.S. | For WBO middleweight title |
| 31 | Loss | 25–6 | Michael Nunn | MD | 12 | Aug 14, 1989 | Lawlor Events Center, Reno, Nevada, U.S. | For IBF middleweight title |
| 30 | Loss | 25–5 | Roberto Durán | SD | 12 | Feb 24, 1989 | Convention Hall, Atlantic City, New Jersey, U.S. | Lost WBC middleweight title |
| 29 | Win | 25–4 | Thomas Hearns | TKO | 3 (12), 2:39 | Jun 6, 1988 | Las Vegas Hilton, Winchester, Nevada, U.S. | Won WBC middleweight title |
| 28 | Win | 24–4 | Michael Olajide | TKO | 5 (10), 1:21 | Mar 6, 1988 | Felt Forum, New York City, New York, U.S. | |
| 27 | Win | 23–4 | Sanderline Williams | SD | 10 | Jan 29, 1988 | Broadway by the Bay Theater, Atlantic City, New Jersey, U.S. | |
| 26 | Loss | 22–4 | Sumbu Kalambay | UD | 15 | Oct 23, 1987 | Palazzo dello Sport, Livorno, Italy | For vacant WBA middleweight title |
| 25 | Win | 22–3 | Jorge Amparo | UD | 10 | Apr 3, 1987 | Caesars Palace, Paradise, Nevada, U.S. | |
| 24 | Win | 21–3 | Stacy McSwain | UD | 10 | Feb 20, 1987 | Sands, Atlantic City, New Jersey, U.S. | |
| 23 | Win | 20–3 | James Kinchen | SD | 10 | Oct 17, 1986 | Cobo Arena, Detroit, Michigan, U.S. | |
| 22 | Win | 19–3 | Basante Blanco | RTD | 4 (10), 0:01 | Jul 24, 1986 | Felt Forum, New York City, New York, U.S. | |
| 21 | Win | 18–3 | Tony Harrison | KO | 3 (12), 2:06 | Jun 19, 1986 | Felt Forum, New York City, New York, U.S. | Won vacant WBC Continental Americas middleweight title |
| 20 | Win | 17–3 | Mike Tinley | SD | 12 | Dec 6, 1985 | Felt Forum, New York City, New York, U.S. | Won vacant WBC Continental Americas middleweight title |
| 19 | Win | 16–3 | Wilford Scypion | KO | 8 (10), 2:59 | Nov 1, 1985 | Felt Forum, New York City, New York, U.S. | |
| 18 | Win | 15–3 | Norberto Sabater | KO | 2 (10), 1:21 | Aug 29, 1985 | Felt Forum, New York City, New York, U.S. | |
| 17 | Win | 14–3 | Bill Lee | TKO | 3 (10), 1:58 | Aug 8, 1985 | Felt Forum, New York City, New York, U.S. | |
| 16 | Win | 13–3 | Carlos Betancourt | KO | 1 (10), 1:48 | Jul 11, 1985 | Felt Forum, New York City, New York, U.S. | |
| 15 | Win | 12–3 | Randy Smith | UD | 10 | May 24, 1985 | Felt Forum, New York City, New York, U.S. | |
| 14 | Win | 11–3 | Norberto Sabater | TKO | 2 (8), 2:25 | Apr 26, 1985 | Felt Forum, New York City, New York, U.S. | |
| 13 | Win | 10–3 | Osley Silas | TKO | 6 (8), 2:25 | Feb 21, 1985 | Steel Pier, Atlantic City, New Jersey, U.S. | |
| 12 | Loss | 9–3 | Eddie Hall | SD | 8 | Nov 1, 1984 | Steel Pier, Atlantic City, New Jersey, U.S. | |
| 11 | Win | 9–2 | John Ford | TKO | 5 (8) | Aug 23, 1984 | Steel Pier, Atlantic City, New Jersey, U.S. | |
| 10 | Win | 8–2 | Esteban Pizzarro | UD | 8 | Jul 5, 1984 | Steel Pier, Atlantic City, New Jersey, U.S. | |
| 9 | Loss | 7–2 | Robbie Sims | TKO | 6 (10), 2:21 | Jan 6, 1984 | Steel Pier, Atlantic City, New Jersey, U.S. | |
| 8 | Win | 7–1 | Marciano Bernardi | TKO | 1, 2:27 | Dec 15, 1983 | Steel Pier, Atlantic City, New Jersey, U.S. | |
| 7 | Win | 6–1 | Frank Minton | TKO | 5, 1:21 | Aug 18, 1983 | Steel Pier, Atlantic City, New Jersey, U.S. | |
| 6 | Win | 5–1 | Jose Torres | UD | 6 | Jun 18, 1983 | Steel Pier, Atlantic City, New Jersey, U.S. | |
| 5 | Loss | 4–1 | Osley Silas | PTS | 6 | Mar 31, 1983 | Atlantic City, New Jersey, U.S. | |
| 4 | Win | 4–0 | Donnie Franklin | UD | 4 | Feb 18, 1983 | Steel Pier, Atlantic City, New Jersey, U.S. | |
| 3 | Win | 3–0 | Donnie Williams | TKO | 1 (4), 2:45 | Jan 29, 1983 | Bally's Park Place, Atlantic City, New Jersey, U.S. | |
| 2 | Win | 2–0 | Bruce Starling | KO | 2 (4) | Jan 6, 1983 | Sands, Atlantic City, New Jersey, U.S. | |
| 1 | Win | 1–0 | Larry Jordan | TKO | 2 (4) | Dec 9, 1982 | Sands, Atlantic City, New Jersey, U.S. | |

== Titles in boxing ==
=== Major world titles ===
- WBC middleweight champion (160 lbs)
- IBF super middleweight champion (168 lbs)
- WBA light heavyweight champion (175 lbs)

=== Regional/International titles ===
- WBC Continental Americas middleweight champion (160 lbs) (2×)

== Honors and awards ==
Barkley is a member of the New Jersey Boxing Hall of Fame.

== See also ==
- List of boxing triple champions
- List of WBC world champions
- List of IBF super world champions
- List of WBA world champions

Sporting positions
Regional boxing titles
| Vacant Title last held by Jose Quinones | WBC Continental Americas middleweight champion December 6, 1985 – December 14, 1985; Vacated | Vacant Title next held by Esteban Pizzarro |
| Vacant Title last held by Esteban Pizzarro | WBC Continental Americas middleweight champion June 19, 1986 – June 1987; Vacated | Vacant Title next held by Ricky Stackhouse |
Minor world boxing titles
| Vacant Title last held by Will Hinton | WBB heavyweight champion June 8, 1997 – May 1999; Vacated | Vacant Title next held by Mika Kihlström |
Major world boxing titles
| Preceded by Thomas Hearns | WBC middleweight champion June 6, 1988 – February 24, 1989 | Succeeded by Roberto Durán |
| Preceded by Darrin Van Horn | IBF super middleweight champion January 10, 1992 – February 13, 1993 | Succeeded by James Toney |
| Preceded by Thomas Hearns | WBA light heavyweight champion March 20, 1992 – May 27, 1992 | Vacant Title next held by Virgil Hill |
Awards
| Previous: Sugar Ray Leonard; SD12 Marvin Hagler | The Ring Upset of the Year; TKO3 Thomas Hearns; 1988 | Next: René Jacquot; UD12 Donald Curry |
| Previous: Vinny Paz | The Ring Comeback of the Year; 1992 | Next: Zack Padilla |
