= Iran Barkley vs. James Toney =

Boxing match

Two Angry Men
- Date: February 13, 1993
- Venue: Caesars Palace, Paradise, Nevada, U.S.
- Title(s) on the line: IBF super middleweight title

Tale of the tape
Boxer	Iran Barkley	James Toney
Nickname	The Blade	Lights Out
Hometown	The Bronx, New York, U.S.	Grand Rapids, Michigan, U.S.
Purse	$1,000,000	$1,000,000
Pre-fight record	30–7 (18 KO)	33–0–2 (22 KO)
Age	32 years, 9 months	24 years, 5 months
Height	6 ft 1 in (185 cm)	5 ft 9 in (175 cm)
Weight	167 lb (76 kg)	168 lb (76 kg)
Style	Orthodox	Orthodox
Recognition	IBF; Super Middleweight Champion; The Ring; No. 2 Ranked Super Middleweight	IBF; Middleweight Champion; The Ring; No. 2 Ranked Middleweight; The Ring No. 10 ranked pound-for-pound fighter

Result
- Toney wins via 9th round RTD

Iran Barkley vs. James Toney, billed as Two Angry Men, was a professional boxing match contested on February 13, 1993, for the IBF super middleweight title.

== Background ==
Reigning IBF super middleweight champion had defeated Thomas Hearns by a close split decision in March 1992 to claim Hearns' WBA light heavyweight title. Following the victory, Barkley opted to relinquish the light heavyweight title and continue to fight in the super middleweight division. Barkley's first defense of his super middleweight title was originally scheduled to take place against former WBO middleweight champion Doug DeWitt in Beijing, China on October 16. However, the fight was cancelled after Barkley developed severe tendinitis in his left elbow.

Prior to the cancellation of his fight against DeWitt, Barkley confronted IBF middleweight champion James Toney at a post-fight press conference after Toney had successfully defended his title against Mike McCallum on August 29, 1992. The two men exchanged words before security stepped in to prevent the scene from escalating, though promoter Bob Arum waved the security off and allowed Barkley and Toney to continue their banter. After Barkley's elbow injury healed, plans were put in motion for a Barkley–Toney fight, with the fighters first taking part in tune-up bouts on December 5, 1992, at the Trump Taj Mahal in Atlantic City, New Jersey. Barkley would defeat Robert Folley by fourth-round knockout while Toney would stop Doug DeWitt by referee technical decision, putting their super middleweight championship fight on. Chaos again ensued at the post-fight press conference with Barkley and Toney hurling epithets at each other with their respective entourages also getting into a scuffle as well. Afterwards Barkley promised that he would "ruin Toney."

Each fighter was scheduled to earn a career high $1,000,000 purse. Toney, who still held the IBF middleweight title going into the fight, announced that he would vacate that title in favor of the super middleweight title should he defeat Barkley.

== The fight ==
The fight proved to be a lopsided affair as Toney dominated Barkley, winning eight of the nine rounds. Toney bloodied Barkley's nose in the first round, dislodged his mouthpiece twice and by the third round, Barkley's left eye began to swell and got progressively worse as the fight went on. With Barkley's eye almost completely shut by the end of the eighth round, referee Richard Steele asked ringside doctor Flip Homanski to examine the injury to determine if Barkley was healthy enough to continue. Homanski cleared Barkley to continue the fight, but after continuing to take tremendous punishment in the ninth round, Barkley's trainer Eddie Mustafa Muhammad informed Barkley that he would not let him continue. Barkley protested the decision, but after Steele advised ringside officials that Barkley was in no shape to continue, the fight was stopped and Toney was awarded the victory by referee technical decision.

== Aftermath ==
ESPN's boxing commentator Barry Thompkins would describe Toney's performance as "as close, I believe, to perfection as you can be in a boxing match."

== Fight card ==
Confirmed bouts:

Weight Class	Weight		vs.		Method	Round	Notes
Super Middleweight	168 lbs.	James Toney	def.	Iran Barkley (c)	RTD	9/12	^{Note 1}
Super Middleweight	168 lbs.	Roy Jones Jr.	def.	Glenn Wolfe	TKO	1/10
Welterweight	147 lbs.	Clayton Williams	def.	Bronco McKart	UD	4/4
Middleweight	160 lbs.	Joseph Kiwanuka	def.	Jacobo Garcia	UD	4/4
Super Featherweight	130 lbs.	Fernando Sanchez	def.	Juan Carlos Lopez	UD	4/4

^Note 1 For IBF super middleweight title

== Broadcasting ==
Country	Broadcaster
United States	HBO

Preceded by vs. Robert Folley	Iran Barkley's bouts 13 February 1993	Succeeded by vs. Dino Stewart
Preceded by vs. Doug DeWitt	James Toney's bouts 13 February 1993	Succeeded by vs. Govoner Chavers
