= Darrin Van Horn vs. Iran Barkley =

Boxing match

Champions and Olympians
- Date: January 10, 1992
- Venue: The Paramount, New York City, New York, U.S.
- Title(s) on the line: IBF super middleweight title

Tale of the tape
Boxer	Darrin Van Horn	Iran Barkley
Nickname	Schoolboy	The Blade
Hometown	Lexington, Kentucky, U.S.	The Bronx, New York, U.S.
Purse	$100,000	$60,000
Pre-fight record	48–2 (29 KO)	27–7 (16 KO)
Age	23 years, 4 months	31 years, 8 months
Height	5 ft 11 in (180 cm)	6 ft 1 in (185 cm)
Weight	167 lb (76 kg)	168 lb (76 kg)
Style	Orthodox	Orthodox
Recognition	IBF; Super Middleweight Champion; The Ring; No. 3 Ranked Super Middleweight	IBF; No. 7 Ranked Light Heavyweight; WBC; No. 14 Ranked Light Heavyweight; Former WBC middleweight champion

Result
- Barkley wins via 2nd round TKO

Darrin Van Horn vs. Iran Barkley, billed as Champions and Olympians, was a professional boxing match contested on January 10, 1992, for the IBF super middleweight title.

== Background ==
For the second defense of his IBF super middleweight title, Darrin Van Horn was matched up against former WBC middleweight champion Iran Barkley. The fight was made after executives from HBO's pay-per-view distribution arm TVKO, whom held rights for Van Horn's next title defense, called Bob Arum's matchmaker Bruce Trampler in hopes that Trampler could find an opponent for Van Horn. By happenstance, Barkley was in the Trampler's office at the time that Trampler took the call and after confirming that Barkley, whom had been fighting as a light heavyweight at the time, could make weight, offered TVKO Barkley as an opponent, which they excepted.

The 23-year old Van Horn had already had 50 professional fights, sporting an impressive 48–2 record, and had become a world champion in two divisions, while the 31-year old Barkley was thought to be past his best after losing 3 consecutive middleweight title fights from 1989 to 1990 before taking a one-year hiatus and then beating two unheralded opponents in unspectacular fashion upon his return in August 1991. As such Van Horn was installed as 2–1 favorite over Barkley by oddsmakers.

The Van Horn–Barkley fight headlined a fight card (billed as "Champions and Olympians") at the newly renovated Paramount Theater (formally the Felt Forum) in Madison Square Garden. The undercard featured a light heavyweight title bout between Olympic gold medalists Frank Tate and Andrew Maynard and highly touted Olympic silver medalist Roy Jones Jr. making his pay-per-view debut against former WBC welterweight champion Jorge Vaca. Originally, the card was also to feature then-WBO light welterweight champion Héctor Camacho facing Carl Griffith in a 10-round non-title bout, however when Camacho no-showed the December press conference announcing the card, promoter Dan Duva and Camacho became involved in a dispute with Duva threatening Camacho with less money with Camacho in turn refusing to fight if Duva made good on his threat. Duva ultimately decided to officially cancel the Camacho fight three weeks before the event.

== The fight ==
Seconds into the fight, Barkley landed a big left hook that wobbled Van Horn and proceeded to dominate the champion for the remainder of the fight. In the second round, Barkley countered a Van Horn combination with another left hook that sent Van Horn down. Van Horn was able to answer the referee's 10 count and continued but was met with a furious barrage from Barkley and was quickly sent down to the canvas for a second time. Again, Van Horn answered the count and continued but Barkley continued to attack and sent him down for a third time after landing another left hand. Following the third knockdown, referee Arthur Mercante Jr. stopped the fight and Barkley was named the winner by technical knockout at 1:33 of the round.

== Aftermath ==
Immediately following his victory, Barkley called for a rematch with former rival Thomas Hearns, whom Barkley had previously defeated in 1988. Promoter Bob Arum, however, had been in negotiations with Hearns that would have seen him challenge WBA cruiserweight champion Bobby Czyz, and stated a Barkley–Hearns rematch would only happen should he be unable to make the Czyz–Hearns fight. After negotiations for the Czyz fight broke down, Hearns and Barkley agreed to terms to face one another on March 20, 1992, for Hearns' WBA light heavyweight title.

Van Horn would fight only six more times after his loss to Barkley, winning all six fights against marginal competition before retiring at the age of 25. He would never again fight for a world title, though he twice had title bouts lined up, first against IBF super middleweight champion James Toney on October 29, 1993, but he pulled out of the bout after suffering a shoulder injury and was replaced by Tony Thornton. Then again in 1994, after an almost-two year layoff, Van Horn agreed to challenge Nigel Benn on September 10, but this fight was also called off.

== Fight card ==
Confirmed bouts:

Weight Class	Weight		vs.		Method	Round	Notes
Super Middleweight	168 lbs.	Iran Barkley	def.	Darrin Van Horn (c)	TKO	2/12	^{Note 1}
Light Heavyweight	175 lbs.	Frank Tate	def.	Andrew Maynard (c)	TKO	11/12	^{Note 2}
Middleweight	160 lbs.	Roy Jones Jr.	def.	Jorge Vaca	KO	1/10
Middleweight	160 lbs.	Julio César Green	def.	Aureliano Sosa	KO	1/6
Super Featherweight	130 lbs.	Eddie Hopson	def.	Juan Batista Bisono	TKO	5/6

^Note 1 For IBF super middleweight title
^Note 2 For NABF light heavyweight title

== Broadcasting ==
Country	Broadcaster
United Kingdom	Sky Sports
United States	HBO

Preceded by vs. John Jarvis	Darrin Van Horn's bouts 10 January 1992	Succeeded by vs. Nicky Walker
Preceded by vs. Jesus Castaneda	Iran Barkley's bouts 10 January 1992	Succeeded by vs. Thomas Hearns II
