= Josh Taylor =

Josh or Joshua Taylor may refer to:

- Josh Taylor (golfer) (1881–1957), English golfer
- Josh Taylor (actor) (born 1943), American comedy and dramatic television actor
- Josh Taylor (boxer) (born 1991), Scottish professional boxer
- Josh Taylor (baseball) (born 1993), American professional baseball pitcher
- Josh Taylor (footballer) (born 1995), English footballer (Dorking Wanderers, Sutton United) see 2023–24 Rochdale A.F.C. season
- Josh Taylor (Neighbours), a fictional character from the Australian soap opera Neighbours, portrayed by Liam Hemsworth
- Josh Taylor (YouTube personality), American internet comedy writer, director, and actor; co-creator of Blimey Cow
- Josh Taylor, member of the American band Half Alive
- Josh Taylor, Australian composer of classical music
- Joshua Taylor, American film and television actor, producer, and director
- Joshua Taylor, an American police officer convicted for the murder of Jared Lakey
- Sgt. Joshua Taylor, protagonist of the 2023 film The Creator portrayed by John David Washington
