= Thomas Hearns vs. Iran Barkley II =

Boxing match

Bombs Away
- Date: March 20, 1992
- Venue: Caesars Palace, Paradise, Nevada, U.S.
- Title(s) on the line: WBA light heavyweight title

Tale of the tape
Boxer	Thomas Hearns	Iran Barkley
Nickname	The Hitman	The Blade
Hometown	Detroit, Michigan, U.S.	The Bronx, New York, U.S.
Purse	$1,200,000	$500,000
Pre-fight record	50–3–1 (40 KO)	28–7 (17 KO)
Age	33 years, 5 months	31 years, 10 months
Height	6 ft 2 in (188 cm)	6 ft 1 in (185 cm)
Weight	174 1/2 lb (79 kg)	174 lb (79 kg)
Style	Orthodox	Orthodox
Recognition	WBA; Light Heavyweight Champion; The Ring; No. 1 Ranked Light Heavyweight; 5-division world champion	IBF; Super Middleweight Champion; The Ring; No. 4 Ranked Super Middleweight; 2-division world champion

Result
- Barkley wins via 12-round split decision (113–114, 115–113, 114–113)

Thomas Hearns vs. Iran Barkley II, billed as Bombs Away, was a professional boxing match contested on March 20, 1992, for the WBA light heavyweight title.

== Background ==
In June 1991, Thomas Hearns had upset the previously undefeated Virgil Hill to capture the WBA light heavyweight title, giving the 32-year-old Hearns his sixth and final world title. For his next fight, Hearns had initially planned to move up to the cruiserweight division to challenge then-WBA cruiserweight champion Bobby Czyz in an effort to become the first fighter to win world titles in six different weight divisions. However, when Hearns reportedly demanded no less than a $10 million purse to fight Czyz, the fight fell through. James Warring, the then-IBF cruiserweight champion, was also suggested as an opponent, but Hearns rejected that fight as well, claiming that he didn't want to move up to cruiserweight. Instead, Hearns agreed to defend his light heavyweight title against Iran Barkley in what was a rematch of their 1988 fight, in which Barkley defeated Hearns by knockout in the third round.

Barkley, who had struggled after his victory over Hearns, was just coming off a big victory over Darrin Van Horn that saw him knock out Van Horn in the second round to capture the IBF super middleweight title.

== The fight ==
The fight was closely contested, with Barkley picking up his second victory over Hearns via a close split decision. Barkley scored the fight's only knockdown, sending Hearns down after countering a Hearns right with a left hook. Though Hearns quickly got back up, Barkley gained an additional point. Barkley was the aggressor for much of the fight, throwing 904 punches and landing 224, slightly more than Hearns who landed 217 of his 578 punches. Hearns's 38% success rate was higher than Barkley' 25% of thrown punches. By the end of the fight, both of Barkley's eyes were nearly swollen shut, while Hearns was almost unrecognizable as both his nose and left cheek had swollen considerably. Hearns was named the winner on one scorecard 114–113, while Barkley took the other scorecards with scores of 115–113 and 114–113.

== Aftermath ==
Hearns said, "It could've gone either way."

== Fight card ==
Confirmed bouts:

Weight Class	Weight		vs.		Method	Round	Notes
Light Heavyweight	175 lb	Iran Barkley	def.	Thomas Hearns (c)	SD	12/12	^{Note 1}
Super Bantamweight	122 lb	Kennedy McKinney (c)	def.	Paul Banke	RTD	6/12	^{Note 2}
Heavyweight	200+ lb	Tommy Morrison	def.	Jerry Halstead	TKO	5/10
Heavyweight	200+ lb	Derek Isaman	def.	Sim Warrior	TKO	2/6
Super Featherweight	130 lb	Mike Juarez	def.	Gerardo Mercado	UD	4/4

^Note 1 For WBA Light Heavyweight title
^Note 2 For USBA Super Bantamweight title

== Broadcasting ==
Country	Broadcaster
United States	HBO

Preceded by vs. Virgil Hill	Thomas Hearns's bouts 20 March 1992	Succeeded by vs. Andrew Maynard
Preceded by vs. Darrin Van Horn	Iran Barkley's bouts 20 March 1992	Succeeded by vs. Robert Folley
