= Virgil Hill vs. Thomas Hearns =

Boxing match

- Date: June 3, 1991
- Venue: Caesars Palace, Paradise, Nevada, U.S.
- Title(s) on the line: WBA Light Heavyweight title

Tale of the tape
Boxer	Virgil Hill	Thomas Hearns
Nickname	Quicksilver	The Hitman
Hometown	Williston, North Dakota, U.S.	Detroit, Michigan, U.S.
Purse	$1,500,000	$4,250,000
Pre-fight record	30–0 (18 KO)	49–3–1 (40 KO)
Age	27 years, 4 months	32 years, 7 months
Height	6 ft 0 in (183 cm)	6 ft 1 in (185 cm)
Weight	173 lb (78 kg)	174 lb (79 kg)
Style	Orthodox	Orthodox
Recognition	WBA; Light Heavyweight champion The Ring; No. 1 Ranked Light Heavyweight; The Ring No. 10 ranked pound-for-pound fighter	WBA; No. 2 Ranked Light Heavyweight; The Ring; No. 3 Ranked Light Heavyweight; 4-division world champion

Result
- Hearns wins via unanimous decision (116–112, 115–113, 115–113)

Virgil Hill vs. Thomas Hearns was a professional boxing match contested on June 3, 1991, for the WBA light heavyweight title.

== Background ==
At the end of 1990 undefeated WBA light heavyweight champion Virgil Hill had agreed to terms to face five-division champion Thomas Hearns. The fight, which was promoted by the Jerry Buss-led Great Western Forum and originally set for May 17, 1991 faced issues due to Hill's questionable marketability as while he had become one of boxing's top fighters, he had not headlined a pay-per-view up to that point. As such, the fight was delayed until June 3 in hopes that the fight would find a bigger pay-per-view audience.

The now 32-year old Hearns had initially planned his next fight to be against rival Sugar Ray Leonard, with Hearns stating that a third fight against Leonard was "imminent" and that it "must happen. I can't go on to the next fight until this one has been resolved." But a dispute over the fights catchweight led Hearns to instead take the fight with Hill. The Hill fight would be Hearns' first without his longtime trainer and manager Emanuel Steward; the two had parted ways the previous year after Steward claimed they had disagreed about whether or not Hearns should retire.

== The fight ==
Despite coming into the fight as 2½ to 1 underdog, Hearns would ultimately earn a unanimous decision victory with one score of 116–112 and two scores of 115–113 to earn his sixth and final world title. Hill basically fought with one hand as a hyperextended right elbow suffered during training prevented him from using his right hand effectively while Hearns dominated with his left jab. Despite, Hill's injury, the fight was more or less even at the mid-point of the fight before Hearns pulled away by taking four of the last six rounds on all three of the judge's scorecards.

== Aftermath ==
Speaking after the bout, Hill said "I thought I won, I feel I out-boxed him. He stole some rounds. I was flat. I posed too much, and I didn’t listen to my corner."

== Fight card ==
Confirmed bouts:

Weight Class	Weight		vs.		Method	Round	Notes
Light Heavyweight	175 lbs.	Thomas Hearns	def.	Virgil Hill (c)	UD	12/12	^{Note 1}
Heavyweight	200+ lbs.	Tony Tucker	def.	Orlin Norris (c)	SD	12/12	^{Note 2}
Light flyweight	108 lbs.	Humberto González (c)	def.	Melchor Cob Castro	UD	12/12	^{Note 3}
Featherweight	126 lbs.	Troy Dorsey	def.	Alfred Rangel	KO	1/12	^{Note 4}

^Note 1 For WBA Light Heavyweight title
^Note 2 For NABF Heavyweight title
^Note 3 For IBF Light Flyweight title
^Note 4 For IBF Featherweight title

== Broadcasting ==
Country	Broadcaster
United States	Fox Sports

Preceded by vs. Mike Peak	Virgil Hill's bouts 3 June 1991	Succeeded by vs. Aundrey Nelson
Preceded by vs. Ken Atkins	Thomas Hearns's bouts 3 June 1991	Succeeded by vs. Iran Barkley II
