= Darrin Van Horn =

American boxer

Personal information
- Nickname: Schoolboy
- Born: September 7, 1968 (age 58) Cincinnati, Ohio, U.S.
- Height: 5 ft 11 in (180 cm)
- Weight: Light middleweight; Super middleweight

Boxing career
- Reach: 73 in (185 cm)
- Stance: Orthodox

Boxing record
- Total fights: 57
- Wins: 54
- Win by KO: 30
- Losses: 3

Darrin Van Horn (born September 7, 1968) is an American former professional boxer who competed from 1984 to 1994. He is a world champion in two weight classes, having held the International Boxing Federation (IBF) junior middleweight title in 1989, and the IBF super middleweight title from 1991 to 1992.

== Professional boxing career ==
Van Horn boxed as an amateur for four years, winning Golden Gloves and Junior Olympic titles. With his father as his manager and trainer, he made his professional debut in New Orleans, Louisiana, on September 2, 1984. Van Horn was just five days short of his 16th birthday.

Since Van Horn was still a high school student when he turned professional, he was given the nickname "Schoolboy." In 1986, he moved to Lexington, Kentucky, to attend the University of Kentucky where he became a member of the Sigma Chi Fraternity. Boxing with the letters "UK" on his trunks, the "Schoolboy" angle was played up heavily.

He compiled a record of 38–0 before challenging for a world title. Van Horn, a 2:1 underdog, defeated Robert Hines by a 12-round unanimous decision to win the IBF Junior Middleweight Championship on February 5, 1989, in Atlantic City, New Jersey. On July 15, 1989, Van Horn returned to Atlantic City to make his first title defense against Gianfranco Rosi, the former WBC Super Welterweight Champion. Rosi, a decided underdog, took the title by winning by a 12-round unanimous decision.

After five consecutive wins, Van Horn had a rematch with Rosi in Italy on July 21, 1990. Although Van Horn fought better than he did in the first fight against Rosi, he was unable to regain the title. Rosi once again won by a 12-round unanimous decision.

Van Horn moved up in weight and won the IBF Super Middleweight Championship with an 11th-round knockout of Lindell Holmes in Italy on May 18, 1991. In his first title defense, he scored a third-round knockout of mandatory challenger John Jarvis in Irvine, California, on August 17, 1991.

On January 10, 1992, Van Horn lost the title to Iran Barkley, the former WBC Middleweight Champion, by a second-round technical knockout in New York City. Barkley, a 2-1 underdog, wobbled Van Horn with a left hook early in the first round and floored him three times in the second.

In May 1992, Van Horn graduated from the University of Kentucky with a bachelor's degree in broadcast journalism.

Van Horn was scheduled to face James Toney for the IBF Super Middleweight Championship in Tulsa, Oklahoma, on October 29, 1993, but he pulled out of the fight after claiming a shoulder injury. The Boston Globe reported: "Sadly, word around boxing says his real problem has been near-constant headaches that recently forced him to stay in a darkened room for days at a time." The Van Horn camp denied that was true, but one fight figure was quoted as saying: "It would be child abuse for his father to put him back in the ring. When I was with him, he knew me and why I was there, but every 15 or 20 minutes he'd ask, 'Why are you guys here?' It's pretty sad."

Van Horn was scheduled to face Nigel Benn for the WBC Super Middleweight Championship in England on September 10, 1994, but the fight was called off. According to Boxing news, it was cancelled after Van Horn failed a brain scan. However, during an interview with Boxing news online in 2015, Van Horn said: "I never failed any scan, not ever. I have no idea where that came from. I fought a few times after the Barkley fight. Rumors and things come up, it's just ridiculous. I just became disenchanted with the sport. I said to myself I was going to step back for a while and get a few things done; like going back to college, and my intention was to come back to boxing. But I never did."

== Retirement ==
Van Horn won his final six fights. His last bout took place in Harlingen, Texas, on August 3, 1994. He defeated journeyman Willie Bell by a second-round technical knockout.

After retiring from boxing, Van Horn became a state trooper.

On August 14, 2026, Van Horn was arrested in Lexington, Kentucky, for violating an emergency protective order (EOP).

== Professional boxing record ==
57 fights	54 wins	3 losses
By knockout	30	1
By decision	24	2

No.	Result	Record	Opponent	Type	Round, time	Date	Location	Notes
57	Win	54–3	Willie Ball	TKO	2 (10), 1:45	Aug 3, 1994	Harlingen Garden, Harlingen, Texas, U.S.	
56	Win	53–3	Ricky Thomas	UD	10	Dec 15, 1992	Foxwoods Resort Casino, Ledyard, Connecticut, U.S.	
55	Win	52–3	Rollin Williams	UD	10	Oct 16, 1992	Boise Centre, Boise, Idaho, U.S.	
54	Win	51–3	Bill Bradley	RTD	2 (10), 3:00	Sep 24, 1992	Civic Center, Bismarck, North Dakota, U.S.	
53	Win	50–3	Martín Amarillas	UD	10	Sep 4, 1992	Country Club, Reseda, California, U.S.	
52	Win	49–3	Nicky Walker	UD	10	Jun 30, 1992	Civic Center, Pensacola, Florida, U.S.	
51	Loss	48–3	Iran Barkley	TKO	2 (12), 1:33	Jan 10, 1992	Paramount Theatre, New York City, New York, U.S.	Lost IBF super middleweight title
50	Win	48–2	John Jarvis	KO	3 (12), 1:11	Aug 17, 1991	Bren Events Center, Irvine, California, U.S.	Retained IBF super middleweight title
49	Win	47–2	Lindell Holmes	KO	11 (12), 1:49	May 18, 1991	Palazzo Dello Sport, Verbania, Italy	Won IBF super middleweight
48	Win	46–2	Randy Williams	UD	10	Dec 28, 1990	Rupp Arena, Lexington, Kentucky, U.S.	
47	Loss	45–2	Gianfranco Rosi	UD	12	Jul 21, 1990	Palazzo del Ghiaccio, Marino, Italy	For IBF junior middleweight title
46	Win	45–1	Jake Torrance	PTS	8	Apr 14, 1990	Loew's Hotel, Monte Carlo, Monaco	
45	Win	44–1	Ruben Cortina	KO	1 (?), 2:45	Mar 2, 1990	Community Center, Biloxi, Mississippi, U.S.	
44	Win	43–1	Salim Muhammad	UD	10	Oct 9, 1989	Clarion Hotel Ballroom, Saint Louis, Missouri, U.S.	
43	Win	42–1	Mike Sacchetti	PTS	10	Sep 25, 1989	Nogent-le-Phaye, France	
42	Win	41–1	Steve Langley	UD	10	Sep 13, 1989	Lakefront Arena, New Orleans, Louisiana, U.S.	
41	Loss	40–1	Gianfranco Rosi	UD	12	Jul 15. 1989	Trump Castle, Atlantic City, New Jersey, U.S.	Lost IBF junior middleweight title
40	Win	40–0	Robert Hines	UD	12	Feb 5, 1989	Trump Castle, Atlantic City, New Jersey, U.S.	Won IBF junior middleweight title
39	Win	39–0	Miguel Angel Hernandez	TKO	5 (10), 2:22	Nov 3, 1988	Showboat Hotel and Casino, Las Vegas, Nevada, U.S.	
38	Win	38–0	Jake Torrance	UD	10	Sep 20, 1988	Memorial Coliseum, Lexington, Kentucky, U.S.	
37	Win	37–0	Juan Elizondo	KO	3 (10)	May 5, 1988	Fairgrounds, Louisville, U.S.	
36	Win	36–0	John Munduga	TKO	7 (10), 2:12	Feb 21, 1988	Hilton Hotel, Frankfort, Kentucky, U.S.	
35	Win	35–0	Joe Summers	UD	10	Dec 5, 1987	Convention Center, Atlantic City, New Jersey, U.S.	
34	Win	34–0	Juan Alonso Villa	UD	10	Oct 17, 1987	Sands Casino Hotel, Atlantic City, New Jersey, U.S.	
33	Win	33–0	Norberto Bueno	KO	3 (10), 1:26	Sep 17, 1987	Felt Forum, New York City, New York, U.S.	
32	Win	32–0	Greg Taylor	UD	8	Aug 25, 1987	Continental Inn, Lexington, Kentucky, U.S.	
31	Win	31–0	Luis Santana	UD	10	Jun 21, 1987	Continental Inn, Lexington, Kentucky, U.S.	
30	Win	30–0	Elio Díaz	UD	10	Apr 20, 1987	Rupp Arena, Lexington, Kentucky, U.S.	
29	Win	29–0	John Moore	TKO	6 (8), 2:46	Feb 24, 1987	Continental Inn, Lexington, Kentucky, U.S.	
28	Win	28–0	Danny Thomas	UD	10	Jan 13, 1987	Continental Inn, Lexington, Kentucky, U.S.	
27	Win	27–0	Sammy Floyd	UD	10	Sep 9, 1986	Rupp Arena, Lexington, Kentucky, U.S.	
26	Win	26–0	Keheven Johnson	KO	8 (8)	Hil 1, 1986	Louisiana Superdome, New Orleans, Louisiana, U.S.	
25	Win	25–0	Donald Gwinn	TKO	5 (8), 2:45	Jun 24, 1986	Continental Inn, Lexington, Kentucky, U.S.	
24	Win	24–0	David Ramsey	KO	4 (?)	Apr 15. 1986	Municipal Auditorium, Lafayette, Louisiana, U.S.	
23	Win	23–0	Norberto Sabater	TKO	2 (10), 2:00	Mar 6, 1986	Landmark Hotel, Metairie, Louisiana, U.S.	
22	Win	22–0	Ed Modicue	UD	8	Jan 21, 1986	Landmark Hotel, Metairie, Louisiana, U.S.	
21	Win	21–0	Reggie Dixon	PTS	6	Oct 15, 1985	Landmark Hotel, Metairie, Louisiana, U.S.	
20	Win	20–0	Javier Muniz	KO	5 (?)	Oct 2, 1985	Houma, Louisiana, U.S.	
19	Win	19–0	Pablo Valdez	TKO	4 (8)	Sep 17, 1985	Landmark Hotel, Metairie, Louisiana, U.S.	
18	Win	18–0	Earl White	KO	5 (?)	Sep 6, 1985	VFW Hall, Terrytown, Louisiana, U.S.	
17	Win	17–0	Robert Manous	KO	3 (?)	Jul 11, 1985	Sports Palace, Morgan City, Louisiana, U.S.	
16	Win	16–0	Reggie Dixon	UD	6	Jun 26, 1985	Municipal Auditorium, Lafayette, Louisiana, U.S.	
15	Win	15–0	Alonzo Stringfellow	TKO	1 (6), 1:10	Jun 10, 1985	Landmark Hotel, Metairie, Louisiana, U.S.	
14	Win	14–0	John Wesley Morton	SD	6	May 7, 1985	Landmark Hotel, Metairie, Louisiana, U.S.	
13	Win	13–0	Ronald Paige	KO	1 (?)	Apr 18, 1985	Civic Center, Monroe, Louisiana, U.S.	
12	Win	12–0	James Sanders	KO	4 (6), 1:33	Mar 20, 1985	Municipal Auditorium, Lafayette, Louisiana, U.S.	
11	Win	11–0	Derrick Earvin	SD	4	Mar 7, 1985	Convention Hall, Gadsden, Alabama, U.S.	
10	Win	10–0	Jessie Hopkins	KO	1 (4)	Mar 4, 1985	Landmark Hotel, Metairie, Louisiana, U.S.	
9	Win	9–0	Jimmy Mitchell	TKO	5 (?)	Feb 12, 1985	Municipal Auditorium, Morgan City, Louisiana, U.S.	
8	Win	8–0	David Seville	KO	2 (?)	Feb 8, 1985	Lafayette, Louisiana, U.S.	
7	Win	7–0	Mike French	TKO	1 (?)	Jan 16, 1985	Municipal Auditorium, Lafayette, Louisiana, U.S.	
6	Win	6–0	Jamie Hobbs	KO	1 (?)	Dec 18, 1984	Morgan City, Louisiana, U.S.	
5	Win	5–0	Rodney Jones	TKO	2 (?), 2:42	Dec 4, 1984	St. Bernard Civic Center, Chalmette, Louisiana, U.S.	
4	Win	4–0	Pete Lee	KO	1 (6), 1:14	Nov 29, 1984	Municipal Auditorium, Morgan City, Louisiana, U.S.	
3	Win	3–0	Willie Rimmer	UD	6	Nov 20, 1984	Landmark Hotel, Metairie, Louisiana, U.S.	
2	Win	2–0	Richard Morris	TKO	2 (?)	Nov 13, 1984	Municipal Auditorium, Lafayette, Louisiana, U.S.	
1	Win	1–0	Leon Kerlinger	KO	2 (?)	Sep 2, 1984	New Orleans, Louisiana, U.S.	

== Titles in boxing ==
=== Major world titles ===
- IBF junior middleweight champion (154 lbs)
- IBF super middleweight champion (168 lbs)

== See also ==
- List of world light-middleweight boxing champions
- List of world super-middleweight boxing champions

Sporting positions
World boxing titles
Preceded by Robert Hines	IBF junior middleweight champion February 5, 1989 – July 15, 1989	Succeeded by Gianfranco Rosi
Preceded by Lindell Holmes	IBF super middleweight champion May 18, 1991 – January 10, 1992	Succeeded by Iran Barkley
Records
Preceded by Matthew Hilton; 21	Youngest Junior Middleweight Champion; 20; February 5, 1989 – present	Incumbent
Preceded by Graciano Rocchigiani; 24	Youngest Super Middleweight Champion; 22; May 18, 1991 – September 8, 2017	Succeeded by David Benavidez; 20
