= Lindell Holmes =

American boxer (born 1957)

Personal information
- Born: Lindell Holmes; April 4, 1957 (age 69) Toledo, Ohio, U.S.
- Height: 5 ft 8 in (173 cm)
- Weight: Middleweight; Super middleweight

Boxing career
- Reach: 72 in (183 cm)
- Stance: Orthodox

Boxing record
- Total fights: 54
- Wins: 45
- Win by KO: 36
- Losses: 8
- No contests: 1

Lindell Holmes (born April 4, 1957) is a retired American boxer who held the IBF super middleweight title from 1990 to 1991.

== Professional career ==
Holmes turned professional in 1979 and in 1986 challenged IBF super-middleweight title holder Chong-Pal Park of South Korea. The bout was ruled a no-contest in the 2nd round after an accidental head-clash opened a cut on Park. In a rematch the following year, Holmes lost a split decision.

In 1990 he challenged for the vacant IBF super-middleweight title against Frank Tate, winning a decision and the belt. He defended the belt three times before losing it to Darrin Van Horn by TKO in eleven rounds. In 1993, Holmes challenged WBO super-middleweight title holder Chris Eubank, but lost a decision. He retired later that year.

== Professional boxing record ==
54 fights	45 wins	8 losses
By knockout	36	5
By decision	9	3
No contests	1	

Result	Record	Opponent	Type	Round, time	Date	Location	Notes
Loss	45–8 (1)	(Cameroon) Jean Marie Emebe	TKO	5 (10)	1993-06-17	(France) Gennevilliers, Paris	
Loss	45–7 (1)	(United Kingdom) Chris Eubank	UD	12 (12)	1993-02-20	(United Kingdom) Earls Court Exhibition Hall, Kensington	For WBO Super middleweight title
Win	45–6 (1)	(United States) Ralph Moncrief	UD	10 (10)	1992-11-04	(United States) Club Bijou, Toledo	
Loss	44–6 (1)	(United States) Darrin Van Horn	KO	11 (12)	1991-05-18	(Italy) Palazzo Dello Sport, Verbania	Lost IBF Super middleweight title
Win	44–5 (1)	(United States) Antoine Byrd	SD	12 (12)	1991-03-07	(Spain) Palacio de los Deportes, Madrid	Retained IBF Super middleweight title
Win	43–5 (1)	(South Africa) Thulani Malinga	UD	12 (12)	1990-12-15	(Italy) Palazzo del Ghiaccio, Marino	Retained IBF Super middleweight title
Win	42–5 (1)	(United States) Carl Sullivan	TKO	9 (12)	1990-07-19	(United States) Kingdome, Seattle	Retained IBF Super middleweight title
Win	41–5 (1)	(United States) Frank Tate	MD	12 (12)	1990-01-27	(United States) Municipal Auditorium, New Orleans	Won vacant IBF Super middleweight title
Win	40–5 (1)	(Venezuela) Fermin Chirino	UD	10 (10)	1989-01-31	(United States) Resorts International, Atlantic City	
Win	39–5 (1)	(United States) Philip Morefield	TKO	6 (12)	1988-11-25	(United States) The Palace, Auburn Hills	
Win	38–5 (1)	(United States) Ricky Stackhouse	TKO	1 (10)	1988-08-25	(United States) Lee County Civic Center, Fort Myers	
Win	37–5 (1)	(United States) Ralph Ward	UD	8 (8)	1988-06-26	(United States) Tropicana Hotel & Casino, Atlantic City	
Win	36–5 (1)	(United States) Steve Darnell	TKO	2 (12)	1988-05-09	(United States) The Forum, Inglewood	
Win	35–5 (1)	(Zambia) Lottie Mwale	KO	8 (10)	1988-03-11	(Germany) Philips Halle, Düsseldorf	
Win	34–5 (1)	(Dominican Republic) Jorge Amparo	UD	12 (12)	1987-09-16	(United States) The Forum, Inglewood	
Loss	33–5 (1)	(South Korea) Park Chong-pal	SD	15 (15)	1987-05-03	(South Korea) Sunin Gymnasium, Incheon	For IBF Super middleweight title
Win	33–4 (1)	(United States) Ron Malek	KO	3 (8)	1987-03-11	(United States) Toledo, Ohio	
Win	32–4 (1)	(United States) Lamont Kirkland	TKO	9 (10)	1987-02-03	(United States) The Forum, Inglewood	
Win	31–4 (1)	(United States) Sammy Floyd	TKO	4 (10)	1986-10-28	(United States) Premier Center, Sterling Heights	
NC	30–4 (1)	(South Korea) Park Chong-pal	NC	2 (15)	1986-07-06	(South Korea) Sports Arena, Chungju	For IBF Super middleweight title
Win	30–4	(United States) Matthew Lewis	KO	7 (8)	1986-04-11	(United States) Sports Arena, Los Angeles	
Win	29–4	(Guyana) Brian Muller	KO	9 (12)	1986-03-17	(United States) The Forum, Inglewood	
Win	28–4	(United Kingdom) Murray Sutherland	TKO	3 (12)	1986-02-25	(United States) Premier Center, Sterling Heights	
Win	27–4	(United States) Jack Padia	TKO	6 (10)	1985-12-17	(United States) The Forum, Inglewood	
Win	26–4	(United States) Luis Rivera	TKO	8 (10)	1985-10-15	(United States) The Forum, Inglewood	
Win	25–4	(United States) Sanderline Williams	TKO	9 (10)	1985-06-29	(United States) Sands Casino Hotel, Atlantic City	
Win	24–4	(United States) Darrell Miller	TKO	2 (8)	1985-05-16	(Canada) Winnipeg Arena, Winnipeg	
Win	23–4	(United States) Andre Cooper	TKO	7 (10)	1985-02-13	(United States) Atlantis Hotel & Casino, Atlantic City	
Win	22–4	(United States) Billy Robertson	TKO	12 (12)	1984-12-20	(United States) The Forum, Inglewood	
Loss	21–4	(Uganda) Ayub Kalule	PTS	8 (8)	1984-11-09	(Denmark) K.B. Hallen, Copenhagen	
Loss	21–3	(United Kingdom) Herol Graham	TKO	5 (10)	1984-07-22	(United Kingdom) Bramall Lane Football Ground, Sheffield	
Win	21–2	(United States) Leroy Hester	TKO	6 (10)	1984-05-15	(United States) Tropicana Hotel & Casino, Atlantic City	
Win	20–2	(United States) Ricky Davis	KO	1 (8)	1984-04-11	(United States) Ann Arbor, Michigan	
Win	19–2	(Saint Kitts and Nevis) Roy Gumbs	KO	7 (10)	1984-03-21	(United Kingdom) Crest Hotel, Bloomsbury	
Loss	18–2	(United States) Dwight Davison	TKO	8 (10)	1983-08-13	(United States) Dunes Hotel, Las Vegas	
Win	18–1	(United States) Alonzo Cutchins	TKO	3 (8)	1983-07-10	(United States) Caesars Hotel & Casino, Atlantic City	
Win	17–1	(United States) Jamie Thomas	TKO	4 (10)	1982-08-27	(United States) Cobo Hall, Detroit	
Win	16–1	(United States) Leslie Gardner	TKO	5 (10)	1982-07-25	(United States) Cobo Hall, Detroit	
Win	15–1	(United States) Buster Drayton	UD	10 (10)	1982-03-07	(United States) Ballys Park Place Hotel Casino, Atlantic City	
Loss	14–1	(United States) Irving Hines	KO	3 (8)	1981-11-12	(United States) Atlantic City, New Jersey	
Win	14–0	(United States) Rudy Robles	TKO	8 (10)	1981-10-13	(United States) Fairgrounds Exhibit Hall, Phoenix	
Win	13–0	(United States) Daniel Alexander	TKO	3 (8)	1981-08-13	(United States) Twenty Grand Showroom, Detroit	
Win	12–0	(United States) James Waire	TKO	8 (8)	1981-05-27	(United States) Towne House Hotel, Phoenix	
Win	11–0	(United States) Carlton Swift	PTS	8 (8)	1981-04-12	(United States) Ballys Park Place Hotel Casino, Atlantic City	
Win	10–0	(Dominican Republic) Fermin Guzman	KO	8 (8)	1981-01-31	(United States) Franklin Plaza Hotel, Philadelphia	
Win	9–0	(United States) Gary Thomas	KO	4 (8)	1980-12-12	(United States) Cobo Hall, Detroit	
Win	8–0	(United States) Sammy Floyd	KO	4 (10)	1980-12-02	(United States) Sports Arena, Toledo	
Win	7–0	(United States) George Madison	TKO	4 (10)	1980-10-16	(United States) Sports Arena, Toledo	
Win	6–0	(United States) Benny Mitchell	KO	3 (6)	1980-09-10	(United States) Cobo Arena, Detroit	
Win	5–0	(United States) Vernon Cunningham	KO	4 (4)	1980-07-17	(United States) Maumee, Ohio	
Win	4–0	(United States) Willie Torres	KO	1 (4)	1980-05-03	(United States) Cobo Hall, Detroit	
Win	3–0	(United States) Clifford Askew	KO	1 (4)	1980-03-02	(United States) Joe Louis Arena, Detroit	
Win	2–0	(United States) Dave Roberts	KO	3 (4)	1980-02-07	(United States) Yack Arena, Wyandotte	
Win	1–0	(United States) Rodney Coupe	TKO	1 (4)	1979-11-15	(United States) Cobo Arena, Detroit	

== See also ==
- List of super-middleweight boxing champions

Achievements
Vacant Title last held by Graciano Rocchigiani	IBF super-middleweight champion January 27, 1990 - May 18, 1991	Succeeded by Darrin Van Horn
