= List of world super-middleweight boxing champions =

This is a chronological List of World Super Middleweight Boxing Champions, as recognized by four of the better-known sanctioning organizations:

- The World Boxing Association (WBA), founded in 1921 as the National Boxing Association (NBA),
- The World Boxing Council (WBC), founded in 1963,
- The International Boxing Federation (IBF), founded in 1983,
- The World Boxing Organization (WBO), founded in 1988,

Reign Began	Reign Ended	Champion	Recognition
IBF
Title inaugurated
1984-03-28	1984-07-22	(United Kingdom) Murray Sutherland	IBF
1984-07-22	1988-03-11 - Vacated	(South Korea) Park Chong-pal	IBF
1988-03-11	1990-01-27 - Vacated	(Germany) Graciano Rocchigiani	IBF
1990-01-27	1991-05-18	(United States) Lindell Holmes	IBF
1991-05-18	1992-01-10	(United States) Darrin Van Horn	IBF
1992-01-10	1993-02-13	(United States) Iran Barkley	IBF
1993-02-13	1994-11-18	(United States) James Toney	IBF
1994-11-18	1996-11-22 - Vacated	(United States) Roy Jones Jr.	IBF
1997-06-21	1998-10-24	(United States) Charles Brewer	IBF
1998-10-24	2004-03-27 - Retired	(Germany) Sven Ottke	IBF
2004-10-02	2006-03-04	(United States) Jeff Lacy	IBF
2006-03-04	2006-11-27 - Vacated	(United Kingdom) Joe Calzaghe	IBF
2007-03-03	2007-10-19	(Colombia) Alejandro Berrio	IBF
2007-10-19	2012-05-26	(Romania) Lucian Bute	IBF
2012-05-26	2015-02-03 - Vacated	(United Kingdom) Carl Froch	IBF
2015-05-23	2017-12-09	(United Kingdom) James DeGale	IBF
2017-12-09	2018-04-07	(United States) Caleb Truax	IBF
2018-04-07	2018-07-04 - Vacated	(United Kingdom) James DeGale	IBF
2019-01-13	2021-11-06	(United States) Caleb Plant	IBF
2021-11-06	2024-07-26 - Stripped	(Mexico) Saúl Álvarez	IBF
2024-10-19	2025-05-03	(Cuba) William Scull	IBF
2025-05-03	2025-09-13	(Mexico) Saúl Álvarez	IBF
2025-09-13	2025-12-23 - Vacated	(United States) Terence Crawford	IBF
2026-04-09	Present	(Cuba) Osleys Iglesias	IBF
WBC
Title inaugurated
1988-11-07	1990-12-15 - Retired	(United States) Sugar Ray Leonard	WBC
1990-12-15	1992-10-03	(Italy) Mauro Galvano	WBC
1992-10-03	1996-03-02	(United Kingdom) Nigel Benn	WBC
1996-03-02	1996-07-06	(South Africa) Thulani Malinga	WBC
1996-07-06	1996-10-12	(Italy) Vincenzo Nardiello	WBC
1996-10-12	1997-12-19	(United Kingdom) Robin Reid	WBC
1997-12-19	1998-03-27	(South Africa) Thulani Malinga	WBC
1998-03-27	1999-10-23	(United Kingdom) Richie Woodhall	WBC
1999-10-23	2000-05-06	(Germany) Markus Beyer	WBC
2000-05-06	2000-09-01	(United Kingdom) Glenn Catley	WBC
2000-09-01	2000-12-15	(South Africa) Dingaan Thobela	WBC
2000-12-15	2001-05-03 - Stripped	(Canada) Dave Hilton Jr.	WBC
2001-07-10	2003-04-05	(Canada) Éric Lucas	WBC
2003-04-05	2004-06-05	(Germany) Markus Beyer	WBC
2004-06-05	2004-10-09	(Italy) Cristian Sanavia	WBC
2004-10-09	2006-10-14	(Germany) Markus Beyer	WBC
2006-10-14	2007-11-04	(Denmark) Mikkel Kessler	WBC
2007-11-04	2008-06-27 - Vacated	(United Kingdom) Joe Calzaghe	WBC
2008-12-06	2010-04-24	(United Kingdom) Carl Froch	WBC
2010-04-24	2010-09-06 - Stripped	(Denmark) Mikkel Kessler	WBC
2010-11-27	2011-12-17	(United Kingdom) Carl Froch	WBC
2011-12-17	2013-04-11 - Stripped	(United States) Andre Ward	WBC
2013-06-22	2014-08-16	(Cameroon) Sakio Bika	WBC
2014-08-16	2015-04-24	(United States) Anthony Dirrell	WBC
2015-04-24	2017-01-18 - Vacated	(Sweden) Badou Jack	WBC
2017-09-08	2018-10-03 - Stripped	(United States) David Benavidez	WBC
2019-02-23	2019-09-28	(United States) Anthony Dirrell	WBC
2019-09-28	2020-08-20 - Stripped	(United States) David Benavidez	WBC
2020-12-19	2025-09-13	(Mexico) Saúl Álvarez	WBC
2025-09-13	2025-12-03 - Stripped	(United States) Terence Crawford	WBC
2026-01-27	Present	(France) Christian M'billi	WBC
WBA
Title inaugurated
1987-12-06	1988-05-23	(South Korea) Park Chong-pal	WBA
1988-05-23	1989-05-28	(Venezuela) Fulgencio Obelmejias	WBA
1989-05-28	1990-03-30	(South Korea) Baek In-chul	WBA
1990-03-30	1991-04-05	(France) Christophe Tiozzo	WBA
1991-04-05	1992-09-12	(Panama) Víctor Córdoba	WBA
1992-09-12	1994-02-26	(United States) Michael Nunn	WBA
1994-02-26	1994-08-12	(United States) Steve Little	WBA
1994-08-12	1999-06-12	(United States) Frankie Liles	WBA
1999-06-12	2000-04-08	(United States) Byron Mitchell	WBA
2000-04-08	2000-09-16 - Vacated	(France) Bruno Girard	WBA
2001-03-03	2003-03-15	(United States) Byron Mitchell	WBA
2003-03-15	2004-03-27 - Retired	(Germany) Sven Ottke	WBA Super Champion
2003-09-03	2004-05-05	(Australia) Anthony Mundine	WBA Regular Champion
2004-05-05	2004-11-12	(Puerto Rico) Manny Siaca	WBA
2004-11-12	2007-11-04	(Denmark) Mikkel Kessler	WBA Super Champion
2007-03-07	2008-05-28 - Vacated	(Australia) Anthony Mundine	WBA Regular Champion
2007-11-04	2008-10-03 - Vacated	(United Kingdom) Joe Calzaghe	WBA Super Champion
2008-06-21	2009-11-21	(Denmark) Mikkel Kessler	WBA Super Champion
2009-11-21	2015-11-12	(United States) Andre Ward	WBA Super Champion
2009-11-21	2011-07-15 - Vacated	(Germany) Dimitri Sartison	WBA Regular Champion
2011-08-26	2012-09-07 - Stripped	(Hungary) Károly Balzsay	WBA Regular Champion
2012-11-03	2012-12-08	(United Kingdom) Brian Magee	WBA Regular Champion
2012-12-08	2013-05-25	(Denmark) Mikkel Kessler	WBA Regular Champion
2013-05-25	2015-05-08 - Stripped	(United Kingdom) Carl Froch	WBA Regular Champion
2015-05-09	2016-02-20	(Russia) Fedor Chudinov	WBA Super Champion
2016-02-20	2016-10-05 - Vacated	(Germany) Felix Sturm	WBA Super Champion
2016-01-09	2016-11-05	(Italy) Giovanni De Carolis	WBA Regular Champion
2016-11-05	2018-07-14	(Germany) Tyron Zeuge	WBA Regular Champion
2017-05-27	2018-09-28	(United Kingdom) George Groves	WBA Super Champion
2018-07-14	2018-12-15	(United Kingdom) Rocky Fielding	WBA Regular Champion
2018-09-28	2020-12-19	(United Kingdom) Callum Smith	WBA Super Champion
2018-12-15	2020-12-19 - Defeated Super Champion	(Mexico) Saúl Álvarez	WBA Regular Champion
2020-12-19	2025-09-13	(Mexico) Saúl Álvarez	WBA Super Champion/WBA
2021-06-27	2024-08-30 - Vacated	(Cuba) David Morrell	WBA Regular Champion
2025-09-13	2026-01-01 - Vacated	(United States) Terence Crawford	WBA
2026-01-01	2026-05-02	(Mexico) Armando Reséndiz	WBA
2026-05-02	Present	(Mexico) Jaime Munguía	WBA
WBO
Title inaugurated
1988-11-04	1990-04-28 - Vacated	(United States) Thomas Hearns	WBO
1991-09-21	1995-03-18	(United Kingdom) Chris Eubank	WBO
1995-03-18	1997-07-05 - Retired	(Republic of Ireland) Steve Collins	WBO
1997-10-11	2008-09-26 - Vacated	(United Kingdom) Joe Calzaghe	WBO
2008-09-26	2009-01-10	(Russia) Denis Inkin	WBO
2009-01-10	2009-08-22	(Hungary) Károly Balzsay	WBO
2009-08-22	2012-08-25	(Germany) Robert Stieglitz	WBO
2012-08-25	2013-03-23	(Germany) Arthur Abraham	WBO
2013-03-23	2014-03-01	(Germany) Robert Stieglitz	WBO
2014-03-01	2016-04-09	(Germany) Arthur Abraham	WBO
2016-04-09	2019-05-19 - Vacated	(Mexico) Gilberto Ramírez	WBO
2019-05-19	2021-05-08	(United Kingdom) Billy Joe Saunders	WBO
2021-05-08	2025-09-13	(Mexico) Saúl Álvarez	WBO
2025-09-13	2025-12-21 - Vacated	(United States) Terence Crawford	WBO
2026-05-23	2026-09-18 - Vacated	(United Kingdom) Hamzah Sheeraz	WBO

== See also ==
- List of British world boxing champions
