= Park Chong-pal =

South Korean boxer (born 1958)

Chong-Pal Park
Personal information
- Born: Park Chong-pal; 11 August 1958 (age 67) Muan, South Jeolla Province, South Korea
- Height: 5 ft 10 in (178 cm)
- Weight: Middleweight; Super-middleweight; Light-heavyweight

Boxing career
- Reach: 72 in (183 cm)
- Stance: Orthodox

Boxing record
- Total fights: 53
- Wins: 46
- Win by KO: 39
- Losses: 5
- Draws: 1
- No contests: 1

Chong-Pal Park (Korean: 박종팔; Hanja: 朴鍾八; born 11 August 1958) is a South Korean former professional boxer who held the IBF super-middleweight title from 1984 to 1988 and the WBA super-middleweight title from 1987 to 1988.

== Professional career ==
Park turned professional in 1977 and won the Orient and Pacific Boxing Federation middleweight title in 1979. He also won the OPBF light-heavyweight title in 1983.

Park became world champion in the newly recognized super-middleweight division when he captured the IBF super-middleweights title in 1984 with an eleventh-round knockout over Murray Sutherland at Changchung Gymnasium, Seoul, South Korea. He defended the IBF title against six different contenders before relinquishing it in 1987 to fight for the vacant and newly created WBA title, defeating Jesus Gallardo. He defended the WBA title once before losing it to Fulgencio Obelmejias in 1988.

Park retired after losing his next fight to In-Chul Baek.

== Professional boxing record ==
53 fights	46 wins	5 losses
By knockout	39	4
By decision	7	1
Draws	1	
No contests	1	

No.	Result	Record	Opponent	Type	Round, time	Date	Location	Notes
53	Loss	46-5-1 (1)	Baek In-Chul	KO	9 (10), 1:47	1988-12-22	World Trade Center, Seoul, South Korea	
52	Loss	46-4-1 (1)	Fulgencio Obelmejias	KO	8	1988-05-23	Waikiki Arena, Suanbo, South Korea	Lost WBA super-middleweight title
51	Win	46-3-1 (1)	Polly Pasireron	KO	5 (12), 2:25	1988-03-01	Jeonju Gymnasium, Jeonju, South Korea	Retained WBA super-middleweight title
50	Win	45-3-1 (1)	Jesus Gallardo	TKO	2 (12), 0:27	1987-12-06	Sajik Gym, Busan, South Korea	Won inaugural WBA super-middleweight title
49	Win	44-3-1 (1)	Emmanuel Otti	TKO	4 (15), 3:08	1987-07-26	Kwangju Coliseum, Gwangju City, South Korea	Retained IBF super-middleweight title
48	Win	43-3-1 (1)	Lindell Holmes	SD	15	1987-05-03	Sunin Gymnasium, Incheon, South Korea	Retained IBF super-middleweight title
47	Win	42-3-1 (1)	Doug Sam	TKO	15 (15), 1:55	1987-01-25	Hilton Hotel, Seoul, South Korea	Retained IBF super-middleweight title
46	Win	41-3-1 (1)	Marvin Mack	UD	15	1986-09-14	Kudok Gymnasium, Busan, South Korea	Retained IBF super-middleweight title
45	NC	40-3-1 (1)	Lindell Holmes	NC	2 (15), 1:10	1986-07-06	Sports Arena, Chungju, South Korea	Retained IBF super-middleweight title
44	Win	40-3-1	Vinnie Curto	KO	15 (15), 2:15	1986-04-11	Los Angeles Memorial Sports Arena, Los Angeles, California, U.S.	Retained IBF super-middleweight title
43	Win	39-3-1	Noh Chang-Hwan	KO	9 (12), 2:10	1986-01-02	Seoul, South Korea	
42	Win	38-3-1	Vinnie Curto	UD	15	1985-06-30	Munhwa Gymnasium, Seoul, South Korea	Retained IBF super-middleweight title
41	Win	37-3-1	Noh Chang-Hwan	PTS	12	1985-04-28	Busan, South Korea	
40	Win	36-3-1	Roy Gumbs	KO	2 (15), 1:42	1985-01-02	Munhwa Gymnasium, Seoul, South Korea	Retained IBF super-middleweight title
39	Win	35-3-1	Wally Carr	PTS	10	1984-10-07	Jangchung Gymnasium, Seoul, South Korea	
38	Win	34-3-1	Murray Sutherland	KO	11 (15), 1:12	1984-07-22	Jangchung Gymnasium, Seoul, South Korea	Won IBF super-middleweight title
37	Win	33-3-1	Roosevelt Green	KO	9 (10), 1:33	1984-06-17	Seoul, South Korea	
36	Win	32-3-1	Charles Carter	PTS	10	1984-02-05	Seoul, South Korea	
35	Win	31-3-1	Rosendo Ruvalcaba	KO	5 (10), 0:42	1983-12-04	Munhwa Gymnasium, Seoul, South Korea	
34	Win	30-3-1	Gary Hubble	KO	9 (12), 1:10	1983-11-06	Munhwa Gymnasium, Seoul, South Korea	Won OPBF light-heavyweight title
33	Win	29-3-1	Ra Kyung-Min	KO	4 (12), 1:32	1983-09-04	Munhwa Gymnasium, Seoul, South Korea	Won OPBF middleweight title
32	Loss	28-3-1	Ra Kyung-Min	KO	7 (12), 1:48	1983-05-29	Seoul, South Korea	Lost OPBF middleweight title
31	Win	28-2-1	Antonio Leyva	KO	4 (10)	1983-04-10	Seoul, South Korea	
30	Win	27-2-1	Naoto Suzuki	KO	4 (12)	1982-12-26	Seoul, South Korea	Retained OPBF middleweight title
29	Win	26-2-1	Valence Haralan	KO	2 (12), 1:44	1982-07-18	Munhwa Gymnasium, Seoul, South Korea	Retained OPBF middleweight title
28	Win	25-2-1	Suwarno	KO	4 (12), 2:59	1982-04-18	Munhwa Gymnasium, Seoul, South Korea	Retained OPBF middleweight title
27	Win	24-2-1	Ritchie Roberts	KO	8 (12), 1:32	1982-02-07	Munhwa Gymnasium, Seoul, South Korea	Retained OPBF middleweight title
26	Win	23-2-1	Mana Premchai	KO	4 (10), 0:57	1982-01-03	Munhwa Gymnasium, Seoul, South Korea	Retained OPBF middleweight title
25	Loss	22-2-1	Fulgencio Obelmejias	KO	8 (10)	1981-11-07	Caracas, Venezuela	
24	Win	22-1-1	Mana Premchai	KO	11 (12), 0:12	1981-09-09	Janhchung Gymnasium, Seoul, South Korea	Retained OPBF middleweight title
23	Win	21-1-1	Lee Sang-Ho	KO	9 (12)	1981-08-02	Munhwa Gymnasium, Seoul, South Korea	
22	Win	20-1-1	Kenji Shibata	KO	5 (12), 1:45	1981-06-21	Munhwa Gymnasium, Seoul, South Korea	Retained OPBF middleweight title
21	Win	19-1-1	Caesar Sasaki	KO	6 (12), 2:23	1981-04-05	Munhwa Gymnasium, Seoul, South Korea	Retained OPBF middleweight title
20	Win	18-1-1	Joe Willisco	KO	3 (12), 2:27	1980-12-06	Munhwa Gymnasium, Seoul, South Korea	Retained OPBF middleweight title
19	Win	17-1-1	Phil Davies	KO	3 (12), 1:32	1980-11-03	Munhwa Gymnasium, Seoul, South Korea	Retained OPBF middleweight title
18	Win	16-1-1	Torkano Marcos	TKO	5 (12), 1:29	1980-09-24	Jangchung Gymnasium, Seoul, South Korea	Retained OPBF middleweight title
17	Win	15-1-1	Peter Piamonte	KO	4 (12), 0:54	1980-08-08	Seoul, South Korea	Retained OPBF middleweight title
16	Win	14-1-1	Fred Rolando Pastor	KO	4 (10)	1980-06-21	Munhwa Gymnasium, Seoul, South Korea	
15	Win	13-1-1	Rocky Joe	KO	8 (12), 1:07	1980-05-04	Jakarta, Indonesia	Retained OPBF middleweight title
14	Win	12-1-1	Kenji Shibata	KO	5 (12), 1:17	1980-03-18	Munwha, Gymnasium, Seoul, South Korea	Retained OPBF middleweight title
13	Win	11-1-1	Katsuo Esashi	KO	3 (12), 1:17	1980-01-27	Munwha, Gymnasium, Seoul, South Korea	Retained OPBF middleweight title
12	Win	10-1-1	Cassius Naito	KO	2 (12), 1:55	1979-08-22	Munwha, Gymnasium, Seoul, South Korea	Won vacant OPBF middleweight title
11	Win	9-1-1	Michihiro Horihata	KO	3 (10), 2:33	1979-06-02	Munwha, Gymnasium, Seoul, South Korea	
10	Win	8-1-1	Armando Boniquit	KO	3 (10), 2:01	1979-04-22	Munwha, Gymnasium, Seoul, South Korea	
9	Win	7-1-1	Alberto Cruz	KO	3 (10), 2:29	1979-03-17	Daegu Gymnasium, Daegu, South Korea	
8	Win	6-1-1	Thomas Abarca	KO	2 (10), 2:14	1979-02-03	Munwha, Gymnasium, Seoul, South Korea	
7	Win	5-1-1	Choi Chang-Baek	KO	3 (10), 0:22	1978-12-17	Munwha, Gymnasium, Seoul, South Korea	Won vacant South Korean middleweight title
6	Win	4-1-1	Kazuo Goshima	KO	1 (6), 0:27	1978-08-28	Korakuen Hall, Tokyo, Japan	
5	Loss	3-1-1	Kang Hung-Won	KO	1 (10), 2:57	1978-06-14	Munwha, Gymnasium, Seoul, South Korea	For South Korean middleweight title
4	Draw	3-0-1	Kang Seung-Hwan	PTS	8	1978-03-25	Munwha, Gymnasium, Seoul, South Korea	
3	Win	3-0	Kang Seung-Hwan	PTS	6	1977-12-25	Munwha, Gymnasium, Seoul, South Korea	
2	Win	2-0	Kim Jung-Sik	KO	2 (4), 0:55	1977-12-23	Munwha Gymnasium, Seoul, South Korea	
1	Win	1-0	Chung Yong-Soo	KO	3 (4)	1977-11-26	Munhwa Gymnasium, Busan, South Korea	

== See also ==
- List of super middleweight boxing champions
- List of WBA world champions
- List of IBF world champions

Sporting positions
World boxing titles
Preceded by Murray Sutherland	IBF super-middleweight champion 22 July 1984 – 4 February 1988; Stripped	Vacant Title next held by Graciano Rocchigiani
Inaugural Champion	WBA super-middleweight champion 6 December 1987 – 23 May 1988	Succeeded by Fulgencio Obelmejias
