= Murray Sutherland =

Scottish boxer

Personal information
- Nickname: Scottish Express
- Born: 10 April 1953 (age 73) Edinburgh, Scotland
- Height: 6 ft 0 in (183 cm)
- Weight: Super middleweight; Light heavyweight

Boxing career
- Reach: 74 in (188 cm)
- Stance: Orthodox

Boxing record
- Total fights: 62
- Wins: 47
- Win by KO: 39
- Losses: 14
- Draws: 1

Murray Sutherland (born 10 April 1953) is a Scottish former boxer who fought in the super middleweight division. He was boxing's first world super middleweight champion, having won the inaugural IBF's version in 1984. Sutherland is also a successful boxing trainer, having trained well known boxers such as Eric Esch (sometimes known as "Butterbean") and Rocky Gannon.

== Professional career ==
Sutherland turned professional in 1977 and compiled a record of 27–5 before facing WBC light heavyweight champion Matthew Saad Muhammad, for the world title. Sutherland would go on to lose via a controversial 9th round stoppage. He would get a second opportunity at a world title a year later, this time unsuccessfully challenging WBA light heavyweight champion Michael Spinks. Sutherland would get yet another shot at a world title in 1984 & this time would be on the winning side, outpointing Ernie Singletary to win the inaugural IBF super middleweight world title.

== Professional boxing record ==
62 fights	47 wins	14 losses
By knockout	39	7
By decision	8	7
Draws	1	

No.	Result	Record	Opponent	Type	Round, time	Date	Location	Notes
62	Loss	47–14–1	Lindell Holmes	TKO	3 (12)	25 February 1986	Premier Center, Sterling Heights, Michigan, U.S.	Lost USBA Super Middleweight Title
61	Win	47–13–1	Mike Hyman	KO	2 (10)	15 November 1985	Greensboro Coliseum, Greensboro, North Carolina, U.S.	
60	Loss	46–13–1	Bobby Czyz	UD	10 (10)	26 July 1985	Atlantis Hotel & Casino, Atlantic City, New Jersey, U.S.	
59	Win	46–12–1	Lloyd Richardson	KO	3 (?)	31 May 1985	Wheeling, West Virginia, U.S.	
58	Win	45–12–1	Robert Pew	TKO	2 (12)	1 March 1985	Atlantis Hotel & Casino, Atlantic City, New Jersey, U.S.	Retained USBA Super Middleweight Title
57	Win	44–12–1	Lenny Edwards	TKO	3 (10)	9 February 1985	McMoran Arena, Port Huron, Michigan, U.S.	
56	Win	43–12–1	Wilford Scypion	TKO	12 (12)	8 December 1984	Memorial Coliseum, Phoenix, Arizona, U.S.	Won USBA Super Middleweight Title
55	Win	42–12–1	Joe Byrd Jr.	TKO	3 (10)	24 October 1984	Civic Center, Saginaw, Michigan, U.S.	
54	Loss	41–12–1	Park Chong-pal	KO	11 (15)	22 July 1984	Jangchung Arena, Seoul, South Korea	Lost IBF super middleweight title
53	Win	41–11–1	Ernie Singletary	UD	15 (15)	28 March 1984	Harrah's, Atlantic City, New Jersey, U.S.	Won inaugural IBF super middleweight title
52	Win	40–11–1	Joe Brewer	KO	2 (10)	24 February 1984	Wichita, Kansas, U.S.	
51	Loss	39–11–1	James Kinchen	UD	10 (10)	19 November 1983	Civic Arena, Saint Joseph, Missouri, U.S.	
50	Win	39–10–1	Alex Ramos	UD	10 (10)	13 September 1983	Playboy Hotel & Casino, Atlantic City, New Jersey, U.S.	
49	Loss	38–10–1	Thomas Hearns	UD	10 (10)	10 July 1983	Caesars Hotel & Casino, Atlantic City, New Jersey, U.S.	
48	Win	38–9–1	Jean-Marie Emebe	TKO	9 (10)	27 May 1983	Civic Center, Providence, Rhode Island, U.S.	
47	Win	37–9–1	Johnny Heard	KO	5 (?)	5 March 1983	Bay City, Michigan, U.S.	
46	Draw	36–9–1	Robbie Sims	SD	10 (10)	4 February 1983	DCU Center, Worcester, Massachusetts, U.S.	
45	Loss	36–9	J. B. Williamson	MD	10 (10)	10 December 1982	Caesars Palace Sports Pavilion, Paradise, Nevada, U.S.	
44	Win	36–8	Mario Maldonado	SD	10 (10)	23 November 1982	Tropicana Casino, Atlantic City, New Jersey, U.S.	
43	Win	35–8	Fred Reed	KO	1 (?)	21 October 1982	Saginaw, Michigan, U.S.	
42	Win	34–8	Tony Mundine	UD	10 (10)	6 September 1982	Festival Hall, Brisbane, Queensland, Australia	
41	Win	33–8	Ron Ayers	KO	2 (?)	12 August 1982	Bay City, Michigan, U.S.	
40	Win	32–8	Gonzalo Montes	TKO	7 (?)	24 July 1982	Astro Arena, Houston, Texas, U.S.	
39	Loss	31–8	Eddie Davis	TKO	6 (12)	11 June 1982	Caesars Palace Outdoor Arena, Paradise, Nevada, U.S.	Lost USBA Light Heavyweight Title
38	Loss	31–7	Michael Spinks	TKO	8 (15)	11 April 1982	Playboy Hotel & Casino, Atlantic City, New Jersey, U.S.	For WBA Light Heavyweight Title
37	Win	31–6	Chris Wells	KO	1 (10)	13 February 1982	Playboy Hotel & Casino, Atlantic City, New Jersey, U.S.	
36	Win	30–6	Henry Sims	TKO	9 (10)	15 December 1981	McCormick Inn, Chicago, Illinois, U.S.	
35	Win	29–6	Darnell Hayes	KO	1 (10)	9 September 1981	Civic Center, Lansing, Michigan, U.S.	
34	Win	28–6	James Williams	UD	12 (12)	29 July 1981	Civic Center, Saginaw, Michigan, U.S.	Retained USBA Light Heavyweight Title
33	Loss	27–6	Matthew Saad Muhammad	KO	9 (15)	25 April 1981	Resorts International, Atlantic City, New Jersey, U.S.	For WBC and The Ring light-heavyweight titles
32	Win	27–5	Fred Brown	TKO	6 (10)	27 February 1981	Civic Center, Lansing, Michigan, U.S.	
31	Win	26–5	Rocky Mack	KO	3 (10)	13 February 1981	Palmer Auditorium, Davenport, Iowa, U.S.	
30	Win	25–5	John Beverage	KO	1 (?)	5 December 1980	Columbus, Ohio, U.S.	
29	Win	24–5	Pablo Paul Ramos	UD	12 (12)	25 October 1980	Silverdome, Pontiac, Michigan, U.S.	Won USBA Light Heavyweight Title
28	Win	23–5	Phil Wade	KO	3 (?)	4 October 1980	Des Moines, Iowa, U.S.	
27	Win	22–5	Joey Butcher	KO	1 (?)	13 September 1980	Milwaukee, Wisconsin, U.S.	
26	Win	21–5	John Cox	KO	2 (?)	12 September 1980	Milwaukee, Wisconsin, U.S.	
25	Win	20–5	Stanley Scott	KO	2 (?)	15 August 1980	Muskegon, Michigan, U.S.	
24	Win	19–5	Benny Mitchell	KO	3 (?)	11 August 1980	Grand Rapids, Michigan, U.S.	
23	Win	18–5	Johnny Townsend	TKO	6 (10)	1 August 1980	Saint Albert High School Gym, Council Bluffs, Iowa, U.S.	
22	Win	17–5	Greg Payne	TKO	6 (10)	19 July 1980	Curtis Hixon Hall, Tampa, Florida, U.S.	
21	Loss	16–5	Michael Spinks	UD	10 (10)	4 May 1980	Concord Resort Hotel, Kiamesha Lake, New York, U.S.	
20	Win	16–4	Eddie Smith	KO	4 (?)	13 April 1980	Huntington, Indiana, U.S.	
19	Win	15–4	Don Addison	TKO	4 (10)	8 March 1980	Joe Louis Arena, Detroit, Michigan, U.S.	
18	Win	14–4	Julius Noble	TKO	4 (10)	1 February 1980	International Amphitheatre, Chicago, Illinois, U.S.	
17	Win	13–4	Al Bell	TKO	2 (8)	17 January 1980	Municipal Auditorium, Pensacola, Florida, U.S.	
16	Win	12–4	Jose Gutierrez	KO	2 (?)	2 January 1980	Bay City, Michigan, U.S.	
15	Win	11–4	Al Bolden	PTS	10 (10)	9 December 1979	Columbus, Ohio, U.S.	
14	Win	10–4	Karl Zurheide	TKO	2 (10)	9 November 1979	Civic Center, Saginaw, Michigan, U.S.	
13	Loss	9–4	Richie Kates	UD	10 (10)	21 July 1979	Silverdome, Pontiac, Michigan, U.S.	
12	Win	9–3	Harold Riggins	TKO	2 (10)	4 March 1979	Civic Center, Saginaw, Michigan, U.S.	
11	Win	8–3	Rick Jester	KO	1 (6)	31 January 1979	Civic Center, Saginaw, Michigan, U.S.	
10	Win	7–3	Bill Hollis	TKO	3 (8)	4 December 1978	Civic Center, Saginaw, Michigan, U.S.	
9	Win	6–3	Gary Alexander	UD	8 (8)	17 October 1978	Memorial Civic Center, Canton, Ohio, U.S.	
8	Win	5–3	Zach Page	KO	3 (?)	29 September 1978	McMaster University, Hamilton, Ontario, Canada	
7	Win	4–3	Harold Riggins	KO	6 (6)	27 May 1978	Civic Centre, Brantford, Ontario, Canada	
6	Win	3–3	Ivy Cory	TKO	2 (4)	5 May 1978	Ballenger Field House, Flint, Michigan, U.S.	
5	Loss	2–3	Dwight Davison	KO	4 (?)	21 April 1978	Roma's, Livonia, Michigan, U.S.	
4	Win	2–2	Gus Turner	TKO	4 (6)	5 April 1978	Masonic Auditorium, Cleveland, Ohio, U.S.	
3	Win	1–2	Tony Curovic	TKO	3 (6)	1 February 1978	Masonic Auditorium, Cleveland, Ohio, U.S.	
2	Loss	0–2	Willie Featherstone	TKO	3 (6)	17 January 1978	St. Lawrence Market, Toronto, Ontario, Canada	
1	Loss	0–1	Kevin Downey	UD	6 (6)	18 August 1977	Halifax, Nova Scotia, Canada	

== Personal ==
On 21 May 1983, Sutherland and wife Stormi had a son, who had to stay in the hospital for a few days. He had a fight against Jean Marie Emebe six days later in Rhode Island. Sutherland used his newborn son's struggle to live as inspiration and won the contest by a ninth-round knockout. His son was later released.

In the summer of 1985, he and wife Stormi had another child, a girl.

== See also ==
- List of British world boxing champions
- List of world super-middleweight boxing champions

Sporting positions
Regional boxing titles
Vacant Title last held by Jerry Martin	USBA light Heavyweight Champion; 25 October 1980 – 11 June 1982	Succeeded by Eddie Davis
New title	USBA super middleweight Champion; 8 December 1984 – 25 February 1986	Succeeded by Lindell Holmes
World boxing titles
Inaugural champion	IBF super middleweight champion 28 March 1984 – 22 July 1984	Succeeded by Park Chong-pal
Inaugural champion	Lineal super middleweight champion 28 March 1984 – 22 July 1984	Succeeded by Park Chong-pal
