= Vinnie Curto =

American boxer

Personal information
- Nationality: American
- Born: Vincent Joseph Curto; July 10, 1955 (age 71) East Boston, Massachusetts
- Height: 5 ft 7 in (1.70 m)
- Weight: Super Middleweight

Boxing career
- Reach: 70 in (178 cm)
- Stance: Orthodox

Boxing record
- Total fights: 76
- Wins: 62
- Win by KO: 26
- Losses: 10
- Draws: 3

Vinnie Curto (born July 10, 1955) is an American former professional boxer. Curto was managed by actor Sylvester Stallone and trained by Angelo Dundee.

== Boxing career ==
=== IBF Super Middleweight Championship ===
Curto lost twice to IBF Champion Chong-Pal Park. The first bout was a decision in South Korea and then a stoppage loss.

=== WBF Super Cruiserweight Championship ===
On September 20, 1996, Curto won the World Boxing Federation Super Cruiserweight Title in Lincoln, Nebraska.

== Acting career ==
Curto has made various film and television appearances. He made his on-screen debut on November 9, 1984, when he appeared on the first season of Miami Vice in Episode 7 entitled "No Exit". He played a bodyguard for Tony Amato, played by Bruce Willis.

== Professional boxing record ==
62 Wins (26 knockouts), 10 Losses (3 knockouts), 3 Draws, 1 No Contest
Res.	Record	Opponent	Type	Rd., Time	Date	Location	Notes
Win	62-10-3	(United States) Jimmy Haynes	PTS	12,12	1996-09-20	(United States) Lincoln, Nebraska, U.S.	Won WBF super cruiserweight title
Win	61-10-3	(United States) Lamont Ware	TKO	2,6	1996-07-14	(United States) Lady Luck Casino, Las Vegas, Nevada, U.S.	
Win	60-10-3	(United States) Torman Doaks	TKO	5,10	1996-05-16	(United States) Lady Luck Casino, Las Vegas, Nevada, U.S.	
Loss	59-10-3	(United States) Ernie Valentine	PTS	5,5	1995-07-09	(United States) Boise, Idaho, U.S.	
Win	59-9-3	(United States) Alphonso O'Hara	TKO	2,4	1994-11-22	(United States) Indianapolis, Indiana, U.S.	
Win	58-9-3	(United States) Tyrone Bledsoe	PTS	4,4	1994-11-12	(United States) Greensburg, Indiana, U.S.	
No Contest	57-9-3	(Cuba) Ali Sanchez	NC	2	1991-05-17	(United States) Reseda, California, U.S.	Double disqualification as Curto attacked Sanchez during a low blow timeout and uncontrolled melee followed.
Loss	57-9-3	(United States) Al Houck	TKO	1	1988-11-23	(United States) Saint Paul, Minnesota, U.S.	
Loss	57-8-3	(United States) Glenn Kennedy	KO	7,12	1987-04-20	(United States) Santa Monica, California, U.S.	For USA California State light heavyweight title
Loss	57-7-3	(South Korea) Chong-Pal Park	KO	15,15	1986-04-11	(United States) Los Angeles, California, U.S.	For IBF super middleweight title
Win	57-6-3	(United States) Maurice Moore	UD	10,10	1985-12-26	(United States) Miami Beach, Florida, U.S.	
Win	56-6-3	(United States) Maurice Moore	TKO	8,10	1985-11-22	(United States) Miami Beach, Florida, U.S.	
Win	55-6-3	(Puerto Rico) Miguel Rosa	TKO	9,10	1985-08-31	(United States) Old Orchard Beach, Maine, U.S.	
Loss	54-6-3	(South Korea) Chong-Pal Park	UD	15,15	1985-06-30	Seoul, South Korea	For IBF super middleweight title
Win	54-5-3	(United States) Mark Frazie	PTS	12,12	1984-08-25	(United States) Miami, Florida, U.S.	Won WBC Continental Americas light heavyweight title
Win	53-5-3	(United States) Clinton Longmire	TKO	6,10	1984-05-23	(United States) Revere, Massachusetts, U.S.	
Win	52-5-3	(Mexico) Zovek Barajas	TKO	6,10	1983-03-22	(United States) Atlantic City, New Jersey, U.S.	
Win	51-5-3	(United States) Jeff McCall	PTS	10,10	1982-10-30	(United States) Caesars Palace, Las Vegas, Nevada, U.S.	
Win	50-5-3	(United States) Hector Negrete	UD	10,10	1982-09-09	(United States) Sahara Tahoe Hotel, Stateline, Nevada, U.S.	
Win	49-5-3	(Trinidad and Tobago) Carlos Marks	TKO	4,10	1982-06-01	(United States) Cranston, Rhode Island, U.S.	Marks was stopped on cuts.
Win	48-5-3	(United States) Pablo Rodriguez	PTS	10,10	1982-04-20	(United States) Cranston, Rhode Island, U.S.	
Win	47-5-3	(United States) Bob Patterson	UD	10,10	1982-04-09	(United States) Springfield, Massachusetts, U.S.	
Win	46-5-3	(United States) Teddy Mann	UD	10,10	1981-06-25	(United States) Boston Garden, Boston, Massachusetts, U.S.	
Win	45-5-3	(United States) Roger Phillips	TKO	2,10	1981-03-06	(United States) Portland, Maine, U.S.	
Win	44-5-3	(United States) Bennie Briscoe	PTS	10,10	1980-12-15	(United States) Hynes Convention Center, Boston, Massachusetts, U.S.	
Win	43-5-3	(United States) Danny Heath	TKO	9,10	1980-05-29	(United States) Revere, Massachusetts, U.S.	
Win	42-5-3	(United States) Donnie Bickford	UD	10,10	1980-05-29	(United States) Revere, Massachusetts, U.S.	
Win	41-5-3	(Canada) Rick Zarbatany	TKO	5,10	1980-03-11	(United States) Miami, Florida, U.S.	
Win	40-5-3	(Canada) Kelly Anderson	KO	3,10	1980-01-20	Quebec City, Quebec, Canada	
Win	39-5-3	(Canada) Eddie Melo	UD	10,10	1979-11-06	Montreal, Quebec, Canada	
Win	38-5-3	(United States) Marciano Bernardi	UD	8,8	1979-10-02	Montreal, Quebec, Canada	
Win	37-5-3	(United States) Dennis Waters	TKO	2,8	1979-08-21	Montreal, Quebec, Canada	
Win	36-5-3	(Canada) Jean-Yves Fillion	PTS	10,10	1979-07-29	Montreal, Quebec, Canada	
Win	35-5-3	(United States) Bill Ramsey	KO	5	1979-07-17	Dolbeau, Quebec, Canada	
Win	34-5-3	(Canada) Ralph Hollett	UD	8,8	1979-06-26	Montreal, Quebec, Canada	
Win	33-5-3	(United States) Bud Ramsey	KO	5	1979-05-10	Montreal, Quebec, Canada	
Win	32-5-3	(United States) Tony Daniels	KO	1,10	1979-04-30	Montreal, Quebec, Canada	
Win	31-5-3	(United States) Roscoe Bell	KO	4,10	1979-02-19	(United States) Sunrise, Florida, U.S.	
Win	30-5-3	(United States) Tommy Ellis	PTS	8,8	1978-12-05	(United States) Miami Beach, Florida, U.S.	
Win	29-5-3	(United States) Tony Daniels	KO	2	1978-06-27	Paul Sauvé Arena, Montreal, Quebec, Canada	
Draw	28-5-3	(United States) Willie Classen	PTS	10,10	1978-04-27	(United States) Madison Square Garden, New York City, New York, U.S.	
Win	28-5-2	(United States) Bob Payton	UD	10,10	1978-03-07	(United States) Upper Darby, Pennsylvania, U.S.	
Win	27-5-2	(United States) Joe Houston	UD	10,10	1977-08-27	(United States) Bath, Maine, U.S.	
Loss	26-5-2	(United States) Tony Chiaverini	UD	10,10	1977-06-17	(United States) Kansas City, Kansas, U.S.	
Win	26-4-2	(United States) Nat King	UD	10,10	1977-05-06	(United States) Miami, Florida, U.S.	
Win	25-4-2	(United States) Henry Walker	UD	10,10	1977-03-30	(United States) Boston, Massachusetts, U.S.	
Win	24-4-2	(United States) DC Walker	PTS	10,10	1977-03-12	(United States) Fitchburg, Massachusetts, U.S.	
Win	23-4-2	(United States) Dalton Swift	TKO	10,10	1977-02-15	(United States) Hynes Convention Center, Boston, Massachusetts, U.S.	
Win	22-4-2	(United States) Steven Smith	UD	10,10	1977-01-29	(United States) Boston, Massachusetts, U.S.	
Win	21-4-2	(United States) Joe Grady	TKO	6,10	1976-12-21	(United States) Hynes Convention Center, Boston, Massachusetts, U.S.	
Loss	20-4-2	(United States) Gene Wells	PTS	10,10	1976-08-17	(United States) Orlando, Florida, U.S.	
Win	20-3-2	(United States) Nat King	UD	10,10	1976-07-20	(United States) Miami Beach, Florida, U.S.	
Win	19-3-2	(United States) Eddie Davis	SD	10,10	1976-02-17	(United States) Orlando, Florida, U.S.	
Draw	18-3-2	(United States) John Pinney	PTS	10,10	1975-09-23	(United States) Miami Beach, Florida, U.S.	
Loss	18-3-1	(Italy) Vito Antuofermo	UD	10,10	1975-08-08	(United States) Las Vegas, Nevada, U.S.	
Draw	18-2-1	(United States) Bennie Briscoe	PTS	10,10	1975-04-07	(United States) Philadelphia, Pennsylvania, U.S.	
Loss	18-2	(United States) Tony Licata	UD	10,10	1975-02-13	(United States) New Orleans, Louisiana, U.S.	For USBA middleweight title
Win	18-1	(Mexico) Chucho Garcia	UD	10,10	1974-11-26	(United States) Miami Beach, Florida, U.S.	
Loss	17-1	(Colombia) Rodrigo Valdéz	UD	10,10	1974-10-25	(United States) Madison Square Garden, New York City, New York, U.S.	
Win	17-0	(Puerto Rico) Luis Vinales	UD	10,10	1974-05-28	(United States) Miami Beach, Florida, U.S.	
Win	16-0	(The Bahamas) Baby Boy Rolle	PTS	10,10	1974-01-22	(United States) Miami Beach, Florida, U.S.	
Win	15-0	(Argentina) Carlos Alberto Salinas	TKO	7,10	1973-12-18	(United States) Miami Beach, Florida, U.S.	
Win	14-0	(United States) Terry Daniels	UD	10,10	1973-11-20	(United States) Miami Beach, Florida, U.S.	
Win	13-0	(United States) Tommy Hicks	TKO	8,10	1973-09-18	(United States) Miami Beach, Florida, U.S.	
Win	12-0	(United States) Nat King	UD	10,10	1973-08-28	(United States) Miami Beach, Florida, U.S.	
Win	11-0	(United States) Dennis Riggs	UD	10,10	1973-07-31	(United States) Miami Beach, Florida, U.S.	
Win	10-0	(United States) Casey Gacic	UD	10,10	1973-06-19	(United States) Miami Beach, Florida, U.S.	
Win	9-0	(United States) Teddy Murray	TKO	2,8	1973-05-29	(United States) Miami Beach, Florida, U.S.	
Win	8-0	(United States) Joe Hooks	PTS	8,8	1973-05-01	(United States) Miami Beach, Florida, U.S.	
Win	7-0	(United States) Guillermo Escalera	PTS	8,8	1973-04-10	(United States) Miami Beach, Florida, U.S.	
Win	6-0	(United States) Bernie Bennett	PTS	8,8	1973-04-03	(United States) Miami Beach, Florida, U.S.	
Win	5-0	(United States) Calvin Hollaman	TKO	1,6	1973-03-20	(United States) Miami Beach, Florida, U.S.	
Win	4-0	(United States) John Henry Jones	KO	2,6	1973-03-13	(United States) Miami Beach, Florida, U.S.	
Win	3-0	(United States) Jimmy Williams	PTS	8,8	1973-02-20	(United States) Miami Beach, Florida, U.S.	
Win	2-0	(United States) David Lee Royster	KO	4,6	1973-01-30	(United States) Miami Beach, Florida, U.S.	
Win	1-0	(United States) Victor Taco Perez	TKO	5,6	1972-10-10	(United States) Miami Beach, Florida, U.S.	

== Filmography ==
Film credits include:

Year	Film	Role
1984	Miami Vice	Tony's Bodyguard
1988	Nitti: The Enforcer	
1989	Amen	Windmill Pearson
1989	Quantum Leap	Link
1990	Downtown	Mr. Lopez
1990	Backstreet Dreams	Gus
1991	29th Street	Zippers Bad Lungs
1992	Night Rhythms	Joseph
1992	Equinox	Gangster
1992	Intent to Kill	'Mooch'
1993	No Escape No Return	Vice Cop #1
1993	Maniac Cop III: Badge of Silence	Kenyon
1994	Bad Blood	Will Sharp
1995	Deadly Past	Nick
1996	Barb Wire	Aide to Pryzer
1996	Unhook the Stars	Danny
1997	Brotherhood	Harry
1998	Walker, Texas Ranger	Goon #1
1998	Surface to Air	Kurdish Soldier
1998	Logan's War: Bound by Honor	Johnny
2002	Stealing Harvard	Loach's Friend
2004	Cross Bronx	Eddie Fusco
2006	Hitman: Blood Money	Rudy Menzana
