= Bad Blood (1994 film) =

1994 film by Tibor Takacs

- North American key art
- Directed by: Tibor Takács
- Written by: Neil Ruttenberg
- Produced by: Alan Amiel
- Starring: Lorenzo Lamas; Frankie Thorn; Hank Cheyne; Joe Son; John P. Ryan
- Cinematography: Bernard Salzmann
- Edited by: Stephen Eckelberry; Steven Nielson; Fima Noveck (supervising)
- Music by: Joel Goldsmith; Alex Wilkinson
- Production companies: Spark Film; MDP Unlimited
- Distributed by: Live Entertainment
- Release date: November 3, 1994
- Running time: 93 minutes
- Country: United States
- Language: English
- Budget: US$2,000,000

Bad Blood (known in most international territories as Viper) is a 1994 American action film directed by Tibor Takács, starring Lorenzo Lamas, Frankie Thorn, Hank Cheyne, Joe Son and John P. Ryan. Lamas stars as a bitter ex-cop who, after losing his badge and serving time to protect his crook brother, is asked by their father and his ex—now the brother's girlfriend—to defend him once more against a powerful mobster he has defrauded. Like MDP's earlier Joshua Tree, Bad Blood mixes noir with Hong Kong influences, and it shares some personnel with that film.

== Plot ==
Unrepentant shyster Franklin Blackstone is ambushed on a parking lot by two mobsters who accuse him of defrauding their organization, with the help of an associate named Ricardo. Franklin escapes the hit, but Ricardo, his wife and their young daughter are cruelly executed by a lone killer while picnicking at a public park. Meanwhile, Franklin's brother Travis, who works for a motor scrapyard, notices a woman observing him at a baseball diamond. The woman is accosted by members of the same gang that earlier targeted Franklin. Travis takes her defense but she leaves hurriedly. Later, she reconnects with Travis at a bar, where she is revealed to be Rhonda, his ex-girlfriend. Travis' current girlfriend Lindee, an employee of the bar, is displeased to see the two hanging out. Rhonda informs Travis that his brother has run into trouble once again.

Travis is unsympathetic, but agrees to visit him when he learns that he has taken in the brothers' ailing father, John. Travis has an uneasy reunion with Franklin and their father, who pleads with him to help his younger sibling buy enough time with the mob to reimburse the money he owes, ostensibly $100,000. It is revealed that Travis is a former cop who was expelled from the force and served time in prison after taking the fall for Franklin in a previous scam, as he wanted to protect him from prison violence. While he was away, Rhonda started dating Franklin, although she hints that she might still be interested in him. Franklin's house is attacked by more henchmen looking to abduct the senior Blackstone, but Travis again helps repel them. Traumatized by the intrusion, Franklin reveals that he has implicated the father's companies in a money laundering scheme for the cartel, and that the money he stole actually amounts to $5 million. He has since lost it after entrusting it to a shifty friend who swore he squandered it in a get-rich-quick scheme of his own.

Meanwhile, one of the henchmen who escaped the confrontation reports back to "Buddha" Chang, the cartel's boss and the sadistic killer of Ricardo and his family. Chang is informed that their efforts were thwarted by the same man they saw with Rhonda at the baseball park. Travis moves his father to the home of an old friend, nicknamed "Preacher", while the rest of the group rent rooms at a downtown hotel. The brothers then pay a visit to Franklin's former partner who, under duress, reveals that he still has much of the money Franklin invested with him. Now flush with cash again, Franklin balks at actually giving it back to the mob. Meanwhile, a suspicious Lindee visits Franklin's place looking for Travis and Rhonda. Although they have left the place, she finds Chang there. She offers the kingpin an alliance. In exchange for information leading him to Franklin, Chang will kill Travis as punishment for going back to Rhonda.

== Cast ==
- Lorenzo Lamas as Travis Blackstone
- Frankie Thorn as Rhonda
- Hank Cheyne as Franklin Blackstone
- Joe Son as "Buddha" Chang
- Kimberley Kates as Lindee
- John P. Ryan as John Blackstone
- Sigal Diamant as Kim
- Cole S. McKay as Baggy
- Beau Starr as Bo
- Vinnie Curto as Will Sharp
- Simon Rhee as Thug Lee
- Stanley Yale as "Preacher"
- Chuck Zito as Toots
- Kent Bryant and Kurt Bryant as Sacs

== Production ==
The film was written by Neil Ruttenberg, before director Tibor Takacs' frequent collaborator and fellow Canadian Brian Irving took a pass at the screenplay. Although he went uncredited for his rewrite, Irving received mention as an associate producer. The script's title, also the filming title, was Smoke on the Water. The IMDb, based on unspecified sources, puts filming circa June 1993, with the budget coming in at close to US$2,000,000. Gordon Hessler, who had directed several action films for producer Alan Amiel while the latter worked for Trans World Entertainment in the 1980s, served as second unit director. Principal photography took place in the Los Angeles agglomeration. Some sources mention Indianapolis, Indiana, as an additional location, but there is no such indication in the credits.

After filming, the title was changed to Viper for international markets, and Bad Blood for North America, which star Lorenzo Lamas said was the intended title. In the U.S., the film was substantially edited to secure an R rating from the MPAA. The original cut remained intact in a number of international territories.

== Release ==
=== Theatrical ===
The film was released theatrically in some foreign markets, such as Japan, where it premiered on June 4, 1994, courtesy of distributor Comstock Group.

=== Television ===
In the U.S., Bad Blood was acquired by premium cable channel HBO for broadcast as part of its "World Premiere" lineup of movies (whose name was often not strictly accurate). It debuted on November 3, 1994.

=== Home video ===
In the U.S., the film arrived on VHS tape via Live Entertainment through WEA Video on May 9, 1995. Live also issued the film on LaserDisc on the same date.

== Reception ==
Bad Blood had received mixed to positive reviews, with its violence standing out as a divisive element. In his review for the book VideoHound's Video Premieres (reprinted from his Roanoke Times column), Mike Mayo noted that "[d]irector Tibor Takacs has obviously been watching his John Woo movies" noting the same "careful choreography and good lighting". However, he regretted that "[t]oo often, though, the graphic violence verges on sadism." Ballantine Books' Video Movie Guide did not take kindly to the film's intense content, lambasting it as "grotesquely violent", as well as "offensively stupid and gory", before warning its readers: "Don't watch it on a full stomach." TV Guide's Robert Pardi deemed the film "[v]iscerally exciting", but found Lamas' efforts to save his "unlikable, manipulative" brother an inappropriate motivation for his character. However, he granted that "[s]ince Bad Blood moves along in an action cyclone, viewers won't have much breathing space to ponder its illogic." In his book The American Martial Arts Film, M. Ray Lott wrote that the film continued the "winning ways" of Lamas' other MDP release Blood for Blood [which Bad Blood actually predates]. He also disagreed with Pardi's criticism, appreciating the contrast between the two brothers, one a hard working blue collar man and the other a suit with a taste for easy money.

=== Follow-up ===
Shortly after completion, Lamas expressed satisfaction with the film and announced that he would work with MDP again. Two possible projects were mentioned, tentatively named Hwarang Do and Bazak. The actor's next film with the company was eventually released in 1995 under the title Blood for Blood (or Midnight Man outside of North America).
