= Baek In-chul =

South Korean boxer (born 1961)

Personal information
- Nationality: South Korean
- Born: In Chul Baek; December 20, 1961 (age 64) Cheonan, South Korea
- Height: 5 ft 9 1/2 in (177 cm)
- Weight: Light middleweight; Middleweight; Super middleweight

Boxing career
- Reach: 72 in (183 cm)
- Stance: Orthodox

Boxing record
- Total fights: 50
- Wins: 47
- Win by KO: 43
- Losses: 3

In-Chul Baek (born December 20, 1961) is a South Korean former professional boxer who competed from 1980 to 1990. He held the WBA super-middleweight title from 1989 to 1990.

== Boxing career ==
Baek became a professional boxer in 1980. He won the Oriental and Pacific Boxing Federation (OPBF) light middleweight title in 1981. His first defeat came in 1983 when Sean Mannion defeated him over ten rounds in Atlantic City, New Jersey. Baek returned to Korea and continued his winning ways. His second defeat came in his next trip to the United States, when he challenged Julian Jackson for the WBA light middleweight title in 1987. Jackson knocked him out in three rounds. Baek then moved up to the middleweight division and in his next fight won the OPBF middleweight title.

On May 28, 1988, Baek won the WBA and lineal super middleweight titles by defeating Fulgencio Obelmejias by an eleventh-round knockout. He defended the title twice before losing it to Christophe Tiozzo on March 30, 1990. Baek retired after that fight.

== Professional boxing record ==
| 50 fights | 47 wins | 3 losses |
|---|---|---|
| By knockout | 43 | 2 |
| By decision | 4 | 1 |

| No. | Result | Record | Opponent | Type | Round, time | Date | Location | Notes |
|---|---|---|---|---|---|---|---|---|
| 50 | Loss | 47–3 | Christophe Tiozzo | TKO | 6 (12), 2:54 | 1990-03-30 | Palais des Sports de Gerland, Lyon, France | Lost WBA super-middleweight title |
| 49 | Win | 47–2 | Yoshiaki Tajima | RTD | 7 (12), 3:00 | 1990-01-13 | Hyundai Gymnasium, Ulsan, South Korea | Retained WBA super-middleweight title |
| 48 | Win | 46–2 | Ron Essett | TKO | 11 (12), 0:26 | 1989-10-08 | Intercontinental Hotel, Seoul, South Korea | Retained WBA super-middleweight title |
| 47 | Win | 45–2 | Fulgencio Obelmejias | TKO | 11 (12), 1:21 | 1989-05-28 | Hongkuk Gymnasium, Yeosu, South Korea | Won WBA super-middleweight title |
| 46 | Win | 44–2 | Park Chong-pal | KO | 9 (10), 1:47 | 1988-12-22 | World Trade Center, Seoul, South Korea | |
| 45 | Win | 43–2 | Kim Jae-Ok | KO | 6 (12), 2:43 | 1988-07-30 | Bugok, South Korea | Retained OPBF middleweight title |
| 44 | Win | 42–2 | Ketut Udiana | KO | 2 (12), 2:58 | 1988-04-17 | Nonsan, South Korea | Won vacant OPBF middleweight title |
| 43 | Loss | 41–2 | Julian Jackson | TKO | 3 (12), 1:17 | 1987-11–21 | Las Vegas Hilton, Winchester, Nevada, U.S. | For WBA super-welterweight title |
| 42 | Win | 41–1 | Hideo Kawamoto | KO | 2 (10), 2:18 | 1987-07-12 | Anyang, South Korea | |
| 41 | Win | 40–1 | Paul James | UD | 10 | 1987-03-15 | Taebaek, South Korea | |
| 40 | Win | 39–1 | Hwang Jun-Suk | UD | 12 | 1986-10–18 | Incheon Gymnasium, Incheon, South Korea | Retained OPBF super-welterweight title |
| 39 | Win | 38–1 | Chang-Hwan Noh | KO | 5 (10), 1:36 | 1986-07-27 | Jeonju, Gymnasium, Jeonju, South Korea | |
| 38 | Win | 37–1 | Jung Sang-Do | SD | 12 | 1986-06-28 | Pohang, South Korea | Retained OPBF super-welterweight title |
| 37 | Win | 36–1 | Troy Waters | SD | 12 | 1986-03-15 | Gangneung, South Korea | Retained OPBF super-welterweight title |
| 36 | Win | 35–1 | Fred Hutchings | KO | 9 (10), 2:53 | 1985-10-27 | Busan, South Korea | |
| 35 | Win | 34–1 | Alberto Bapaimo | KO | 3 (12), 2:45 | 1985-07-13 | Chungju, South Korea | Retained OPBF super-welterweight title |
| 34 | Win | 33–1 | Yuh Jae-Hyung | KO | 5 (12), 2:14 | 1985-04-20 | Munhwa Gymnasium, Seoul, South Korea | Retained OPBF super-welterweight title |
| 33 | Win | 32–1 | Hendris Salmon | KO | 2 (12), 2:23 | 1985-01-12 | Gwangju, South Korea | Retained OPBF super-welterweight title |
| 32 | Win | 31–1 | Alberto Bapaimo | KO | 4 (12), 1:21 | 1984-07-23 | Osan, South Korea | Retained OPBF super-welterweight title |
| 31 | Win | 30–1 | Mike DeGuzman | KO | 3 (12), 1:52 | 1984-03-24 | Ulsan, South Korea | Retained OPBF super-welterweight title |
| 30 | Win | 29–1 | Sakaraia Ve | KO | 6 (10), 1:40 | 1984-01-07 | Daejeon, South Korea | |
| 29 | Win | 28–1 | Satanfa Pratip | KO | 3 (10), 1:47 | 1983-11-13 | Jeju City, South Korea | |
| 28 | Win | 27–1 | Yohi Arai | KO | 5 (12), 2:09 | 1983-07-10 | Chungmu Gymnasium, Daejeon, South Korea | Retained OPBF super-welterweight title |
| 27 | Loss | 26–1 | Sean Mannion | PTS | 10 | 1983-05-19 | Resorts Internarional, Atlantic City, New Jersey, U.S. | |
| 26 | Win | 26–0 | Kim Jong-Ho | KO | 7 (12), 2:22 | 1983-03-27 | Jinju Gymnasium, Jinju, South Korea | Retained OPBF super-welterweight title |
| 25 | Win | 25–0 | Jesus Gonzalez | KO | 3 (10), 2:55 | 1983-02-27 | Chungmu Gymnasium, Daejeon, South Korea | |
| 24 | Win | 24–0 | Romy Angeles | KO | 3 (12), 1:05 | 1983-01-02 | Chungmu Gymnasium, Daejeon, South Korea | Retained OPBF super-welterweight title |
| 23 | Win | 23–0 | Kngrag Vorchareenrat | KO | 3 (10), 2:26 | 1982-12-11 | Jangchung Gymnasium, Seoul, South Korea | |
| 22 | Win | 22–0 | Yohi Arai | KO | 10 (12), 2:04 | 1982-10-23 | Chungbuk Gymnasium, Cheongju, South Korea | Retained OPBF super-welterweight title |
| 21 | Win | 21–0 | Fred Galang | KO | 3 (10), 2:46 | 1982-09-26 | Daegu Gymnasium, Daegu, South Korea | |
| 20 | Win | 20–0 | Antonio Leyva | KO | 2 (10), 2:19 | 1982-07-04 | Chungmu Gymnasium, Daejeon, South Korea | |
| 19 | Win | 19–0 | Michihiro Horihata | KO | 2 (12), 1:45 | 1982-06-13 | Gudeok Gymnasium, Busan, South Korea | Retained OPBF super-welterweight title |
| 18 | Win | 18–0 | Ibrahim Mohammed | KO | 3 (10), 1:45 | 1982-04-24 | Gwangju, South Korea | |
| 17 | Win | 17–0 | Kenji Miyata | KO | 9 (10), 1:08 | 1982-03-21 | Busan, South Korea | |
| 16 | Win | 16–0 | Alberto Cruz | KO | 2 (12), 2:43 | 1982-02-14 | Chungmu Gymnasium, Daejeon, South Korea | Retained OPBF super-welterweight title |
| 15 | Win | 15–0 | Lee Sang-Ho | KO | 12 (12), 2:05 | 1981-12-27 | Munhwa Gymnasium, Seoul, South Korea | Won OPBF super-welterweight title |
| 14 | Win | 14–0 | Joe Willisco | KO | 3 (10), 3:02 | 1981-11-28 | Jangchung Gymnasium, Seoul, South Korea | |
| 13 | Win | 13–0 | Aquilino Nicolas | KO | 2 (10), 1:59 | 1981-10-31 | Jangchung Gymnasium, Seoul, South Korea | |
| 12 | Win | 12–0 | Kim Jin-Nam | KO | 3 (10), 2:35 | 1981-10-11 | Chungmu Gymnasium, Daejeon, South Korea | |
| 11 | Win | 11–0 | Alberto Cruz | KO | 3 (10), 2:00 | 1981-08-21 | Daegu Gymnasium, Daegu, South Korea | |
| 10 | Win | 10–0 | Conrado Salinas | KO | 2 (10), 3:03 | 1981-06-23 | Chungmu Gymnasium, Daejeon, South Korea | |
| 9 | Win | 9–0 | Hiroshi Izumiya | KO | 3 (6), 1:44 | 1981-04-19 | Munhwa Gymnasium, Seoul, South Korea | |
| 8 | Win | 8–0 | Jung Young-Sil | KO | 4 (8), 1:50 | 1981-02-14 | Jangchung Gymnasium, Seoul, South Korea | |
| 7 | Win | 7–0 | Lim Bok-Kyu | KO | 3 (6), 2:48 | 1980-12-07 | Munhwa Gymnasium, Seoul, South Korea | |
| 6 | Win | 6–0 | Choi Jang-Ho | KO | 3 (4), 1:32 | 1980-11-29 | Munhwa Gymnasium, Seoul, South Korea | |
| 5 | Win | 5–0 | Choi Sun-Kap | KO | 4 (4), 1:54 | 1908-11-22 | Munhwa Gymnasium, Seoul, South Korea | |
| 4 | Win | 4–0 | Choi Byung-Chun | KO | 3 (4), 0:37 | 1980-11–21 | Munhwa Gymnasium, Seoul, South Korea | |
| 3 | Win | 3–0 | Park Jong-Hyun | KO | 1 (4), 2:01 | 1980-09-25 | Munhwa Gymnasium, Seoul, South Korea | |
| 2 | Win | 2–0 | Yang Young-Chil | KO | 2 (4), 0:36 | 1980-06-08 | Munhwa Gymnasium, Seoul, South Korea | |
| 1 | Win | 1–0 | Park Joong-Jung | KO | 2 (4), 1:23 | 1980-05-09 | Munhwa Gymnasium, Seoul, South Korea | |

== See also ==
- List of Korean boxers
- List of world super-middleweight boxing champions

Sporting positions
World boxing titles
| Preceded by Fulgencio Obelmejias | WBA super middleweight champion May 28, 1989 – March 30, 1990 | Succeeded by Christophe Tiozzo |
