= Fulgencio Obelmejias =

Venezuelan boxer

Fulgencio Obelmejías (born January 1, 1953), sometimes known also as Fully Obel is a Venezuelan former boxer, who was world super-middleweight champion.

== Biography ==
Obelmejias was born in San José de Río Chico. He represented his native country at the 1975 Pan American Games in Mexico City, where he lost his first fight to Ricardo Arce of Argentina. He also competed at the 1976 Summer Olympics in Montreal, Canada, where he was eliminated in the first round by Cuba's eventual bronze medalist Luis Felipe Martínez.

== Professional career ==
He began his professional career in the Middleweight division, on January 30, 1977, knocking out Franklin Suzarra in the first round at Caracas. After another win over Suzarra, he embarked on a tour of Mexico and southern California, having six consecutive fights in those areas from October 1977 to April 1978. In his first fight abroad as a professional, held at Mexico City, he worked for nine rounds in only his third professional bout before knocking out Jesus Garcia Ortiz. His second to last fight of that tour was against Abel Cordoba, whom he beat by a ten-round decision in Tuxtla Gutierrez on February 27. His last fight on that tour, against Rudy Robles in Tijuana on April 3, marked the beginning of a seventeen fight knockout win streak. He knocked out Robles in four rounds.

After the fight with Robles, Obelmejias had six consecutive fights in his native Venezuela, including a win over Johnny Heard. He then returned to Mexico, to fight for the Fecarbox Middleweight title against Carlos Marks on December 17 in Culiacán. He won the regional title, as well as a top ten ranking at the Middleweight division by the WBC, by knocking Marks out in nine rounds.

Obelmejias kept winning fights by knockouts, and, on March 3, 1980, he got one of the biggest wins of his career, when he beat former WBC world Jr. Middleweight champion Elisha Obed in three rounds at Caracas.

After eight more wins, all by knockout, Obelmejias was made the number one contender for the world Middleweight title by the WBC.

When his first chance to become a world champion arrived, on January 17, 1981, many Venezuelans had faith that he would become world champion; his record at the time (30–0 with 28 knockouts) impressed many boxing fans. However, Obelmejias lost for the first time, being handed an eighth-round knockout loss by then world champion Marvin Hagler in an HBO Boxing televised fight that took place at the famed Boston Garden, home of the NBA basketball's Boston Celtics.

Obelmejias won eight fights in a row, all by knockout, before being given a rematch by Hagler. Among those beaten during that new streak were former world Jr. Middleweight champion Eddie Gazo, beaten in two rounds in Caracas, future world champion Chong-Pal Park, knocked out in eight rounds, also in Caracas, and Alfredo Escalera's cousin, Reyes Escalera, also beaten in two rounds, in Barquisimeto.

On October 30, 1982, he and Hagler had a rematch which was, once again, shown in the United States by HBO. The second time around, Hagler defeated Obelmejias by a knockout in five rounds at Sanremo, Italy. Both Hagler and Obelmejias fell in love with Italy and the country's culture. Obelmejias established himself there immediately after the rematch with Hagler. Hagler moved to Italy as soon as he lost the world Middleweight title to Sugar Ray Leonard in 1987.

After his rematch with Hagler, Obelmejias won nine straight bouts before being upset, on July 27, 1985, by Clarence Osby. Amongst the quality fighters that he defeated during that nine fight winning streak were Jeff Lampkin, beaten by an eight-round decision, Jerry Celestine, also beaten over eight rounds, and Eric Winbush, who was beaten in Monte Carlo by another eight-round decision.

Then, on May 30, 1986, he became the Caribbean Light-Heavyweight champion, when he outpointed Tomas Polo Ruiz over ten rounds at Isla Margarita.

He lost the title in his first defense, when he was knocked out by future world champion Leslie Stewart in four rounds, at Trinidad and Tobago on November 15, 1986.

After one more win, he was given a third try at becoming a world champion, when the Lineal and WBA Super Middleweight champion, Obelmejias' former rival, Chong-Pal Park, offered him a shot.

The third time brought that winning chance for Obelmejias, when he beat Park by a twelve-round decision on May 23, 1988, at South Korea. With that win, Obelmejias fulfilled his lifelong dream of becoming a world champion.

His stint as world champion did not last long, however, and he lost the title during his first defense, 370 days after winning it, being knocked out in eleven rounds by In-Chul Baek, also in South Korea.

== Retirement ==
Obelmejias retired for good after three more wins; he was approaching, at 38, the mandatory boxing retirement age of 40 in Venezuela after his last fight, a ten-round decision win over Eduardo Rodriguez.

Obelmejias had a record of 52 wins and five losses, with 41 wins by way of knockout.

== Professional boxing record ==
57 fights	52 wins	5 losses
By knockout	41	4
By decision	11	1

No.	Result	Record	Opponent	Type	Round, time	Date	Location	Notes
57	Win	52–5	(Panama) Eduardo Rodriguez	PTS	10	Dec 15, 1992	Caracas, Venezuela	
56	Win	51–5	(New Zealand) Otata	KO	3	Dec 18, 1991	Auckland, New Zealand	
55	Win	50–5	(Australia) Chris Nicolaou	KO	6 (10)	Sep 29, 1991	Auckland, New Zealand	
54	Loss	49–5	(South Korea) In-Chul Baek	TKO	11 (12), 1:21	May 28, 1989	Yeosu, South Korea	Lost WBA super middleweight title
53	Win	49–4	(South Korea) Chong-Pal Park	UD	12	May 23, 1988	Cheongju, South Korea	Won WBA super middleweight title
52	Win	48–4	(United States) Chris Reid	KO	10 (10), 1:01	Jun 18, 1987	(United States) New York City, New York, U.S.	
51	Loss	47–4	(Trinidad and Tobago) Leslie Stewart	TKO	4 (12)	Nov 16, 1986	(Trinidad and Tobago) Port of Spain, Trinidad & Tobago	Lost WBA Fedelatin light-heavyweight title
50	Win	47–3	(Colombia) Tomas Polo Ruiz	PTS	12	May 30, 1986	Porlamar, Venezuela	Won WBA Fedelatin light heavyweight title
49	Loss	46–3	(United States) Clarence Osby	PTS	8	Jul 21, 1985	Campione d'Italia, Italy	
48	Win	46–2	(United States) Leon Taylor	KO	2	Dec 15, 1984	Calabria, Italy	
47	Win	45–2	(United States) Eric Winbush	PTS	8	Sep 22, 1984	Monte Carlo, Monaco	
46	Win	44–2	(Argentina) Cesar Abel Romero	PTS	8	Jul 14, 1984	Monte Carlo, Monaco	
45	Win	43–2	(United States) Arthel Lawhorne	PTS	8	Apr 28, 1984	Campania, Italy	
44	Win	42–2	(United States) Henry Sims	KO	4 (10)	Mar 23, 1984	Chiavari, Italy	
43	Win	41–2	(United States) Jerry Celestine	PTS	8	Feb 25, 1984	Paris, France	
42	Win	40–2	(United States) Jeff Lampkin	PTS	8	Dec 14, 1983	Loano, Italy	
41	Win	39–2	(United States) Raymond Gonzales	TKO	4	Oct 24, 1983	Saint Vincent d'Aoste, Italy	
40	Loss	38–2	(United States) "Marvelous" Marvin Hagler	TKO	5 (15), 2:35	Oct 30, 1982	Sanremo, Italy	For WBA and WBC middleweight titles
39	Win	38–1	(United States) Willie Torres	TKO	8 (10)	Aug 9, 1982	Porlamar, Venezuela	
38	Win	37–1	(Puerto Rico) Reyes Escalera	TKO	2	Jun 14, 1982	Barquisimeto, Venezuela	
37	Win	36–1	(United States) Johnny Wise	KO	2	Feb 15, 1982	Caracas, Venezuela	
36	Win	35–1	(South Korea) Chong-Pal Park	KO	8 (10)	Nov 7, 1981	Caracas, Venezuela	
35	Win	34–1	(Nicaragua) Eddie Gazo	KO	2	Oct 6, 1981	Caracas, Venezuela	
34	Win	33–1	(United Kingdom) Wayne Barker	TKO	2 (10)	Aug 31, 1981	Caracas, Venezuela	
33	Win	32–1	(United States) Joe Gonsalves	TKO	2 (10)	May 30, 1981	Caracas, Venezuela	
32	Win	31–1	(Argentina) Norberto Rufino Cabrera	KO	5 (10)	May 4, 1981	Caracas, Venezuela	
31	Loss	30–1	(United States) "Marvelous" Marvin Hagler	TKO	8 (15), 0:20	Jan 17, 1981	(United States) Boston, Massachusetts, U.S.	For WBA and WBC middleweight titles
30	Win	30–0	(United States) James Waire	TKO	3 (10), 2:49	Nov 28, 1980	Campione d'Italia, Italy	
29	Win	29–0	(United States) Leroy Green Jr.	TKO	3	Oct 31, 1980	Rome, Italy	
28	Win	28–0	(United States) Fred Johnson	TKO	3	Sep 10, 1980	Sanremo, Italy	
27	Win	27–0	(United States) Felton Marshall	PTS	10	Aug 19, 1980	Caracas, Venezuela	
26	Win	26–0	(United States) Clifford Wills	TKO	3	Jun 30, 1980	Caracas, Venezuela	
25	Win	25–0	(United States) Lamont Lovelady	PTS	10	May 26, 1980	Caracas, Venezuela	
24	Win	24–0	(Venezuela) Walter Miranda	KO	1	Apr 14, 1980	Caracas, Venezuela	
23	Win	23–0	(Mexico) Abel Cordoba	KO	2	Apr 1, 1980	Caracas, Venezuela	
22	Win	22–0	(The Bahamas) Elisha Obed	TKO	3 (10)	Mar 3, 1980	Caracas, Venezuela	
21	Win	21–0	(United States) Ray Phillips	KO	4	Dec 17, 1979	Caracas, Venezuela	
20	Win	20–0	(United States) George Lee	TKO	1	Oct 26, 1979	Caracas, Venezuela	
19	Win	19–0	(United States) Sammy Floyd	TKO	10	Sep 16, 1979	Caracas, Venezuela	
18	Win	18–0	(Dominican Republic) Luis Arias	KO	2 (12)	Aug 7, 1979	Caracas, Venezuela	Retained WBC FECARBOX middleweight title
17	Win	17–0	(United States) Jamie Thomas	KO	5	Apr 1, 1979	Caracas, Venezuela	
16	Win	16–0	(United States) Angel Jose Ortiz	KO	2	Feb 10, 1979	Caracas, Venezuela	
15	Win	15–0	(Trinidad and Tobago) Carlos Marks	TKO	9 (12)	Dec 17, 1978	Culiacan, Mexico	Won WBC FECARBOX middleweight title
14	Win	14–0	(United States) Ken Blackwell	KO	3	Nov 12, 1978	Caracas, Venezuela	
13	Win	13–0	(United States) Johnny Heard	KO	7	Sep 17, 1978	Caracas, Venezuela	
12	Win	12–0	(United States) Willie Warren	RTD	9 (10)	Jul 30, 1978	Caracas, Venezuela	
11	Win	11–0	(Puerto Rico) Sandy Torres	KO	4	Jul 15, 1978	Caracas, Venezuela	
10	Win	10–0	(Dominican Republic) Jose Anglada	KO	1	Jun 4, 1978	Caracas, Venezuela	
9	Win	9–0	(Venezuela) Rolando Martinez	TKO	1	Apr 30, 1978	Caracas, Venezuela	
8	Win	8–0	(United States) Rudy Robles	TKO	4 (10), 2:05	Apr 3, 1978	Tijuana, Mexico	
7	Win	7–0	(Mexico) Abel Cordoba	PTS	10	Feb 27, 1978	Tuxtla Gutierrez, Mexico	
6	Win	6–0	(Mexico) Vicente Pinon	KO	2 (10)	Feb 4, 1978	Mexico City, Mexico	
5	Win	5–0	Rogelio Vera	KO	2 (10)	Dec 17, 1977	Mexico City, Mexico	
4	Win	4–0	(United States) Andre Beard	KO	1, 1:50	Nov 18, 1977	San Diego, California, US	
3	Win	3–0	Jesus Garza Ortiz	KO	9	Oct 22, 1977	Mexico City, Mexico	
2	Win	2–0	Franklin Suzarra	TKO	2	Apr 3, 1977	Caracas, Venezuela	
1	Win	1–0	Franklin Suzarra	TKO	1	Jan 30, 1977	Caracas, Venezuela	

== See also ==
- List of super middleweight boxing champions
- List of WBA world champions

Sporting positions
World boxing titles
Preceded by Chong-Pal Park	WBA super middleweight champion Lineal super middleweight champion May 23, 1988 – May 28, 1989	Succeeded by In-Chul Baek
