= Hank Cheyne =

American actor

- Born: Henry Edward Garcia; August 13, 1958 (age 67); Santa Maria, California, U.S.
- Education: Santa Clara University (BS); University of California, Los Angeles (JD)
- Years active: 1986–present

Hank Cheyne (born August 13, 1958) is an American actor and former lawyer known for playing Ricardo Torres in the soap opera Sunset Beach (1997–1999). He also played the role of Scott LaSalle on Another World (1986–1988) and Anton Vargas on Saints & Sinners.

== Early life and education ==
Born Henry Edward Garcia in Santa Maria, California, Cheyne graduated from Santa Clara University in 1980 with a Bachelor of Science degree in business, where he also played varsity baseball. After graduating from Santa Clara, he attended and graduated from UCLA School of Law.

== Career ==
While still in law school, Cheyne worked as a model in Milan, where he was discovered by an acting coach. After passing the California bar exam, Cheyne worked for a law firm in Beverly Hills, California, and began pursuing a career as an actor.

== Personal life ==
He took "Cheyne" as his stage name from the town Cheyenne, Wyoming, which is where his parents met. Cheyne's grandfather was full-blooded Yaqui Indian.

== Filmography ==
=== Film ===
Year	Title	Role	Notes
1986	The Education of Allison Tate	Pedro Aleman	
1988	Death Spa	Robert	
1993	Loaded Weapon 1	Stormtrooper	
1994	Bad Blood	Franklin Blackstone	
1994	Killing Obsession	Randy	
2005	The Nickel Children	Angry Father	

=== Television ===
Year	Title	Role	Notes
1986–1988	Another World	Scott LaSalle	32 episodes
1993	Dark Justice	Luther	Episode: "Cold Reading"
1994	Deep Red	Bradley Parker	Television film
1994	Deconstructing Sarah	Car Rental Clerk	Television film
1994, 1995	One West Waikiki	Kona	2 episodes
1996	ER	Wong	Episode: "The Healers"
1997–1999	Sunset Beach	Ricardo Torres	491 episodes
1998	Sunset Beach: Shockwave	Ricardo Torres	Television film
2007	Saints & Sinners	Anton Vargas	62 episodes
2010–2011	Big Love	Austin Buttercup	4 episodes
2011	Sons of Anarchy	Lobos Sonora Lieutenant	Episode: "Kiss"
2013	Criminal Minds	Detective Edward Sanchez	Episode: "Broken"
2014–2017	Longmire	Sam Poteet / White Warrior	10 episodes
2018–2019	The Bay	Jean-Carlos	3 episodes
2019	The Morning Show	Disgraced Director	Episode: "A Seat at the Table"
