= Roy Gumbs (boxer) =

Saint Kitts and Nevis/British boxer

Personal information
- Nationality: Saint Kitts and Nevis/British
- Born: 9 September 1954 (age 71) Saint Kitts and Nevis
- Height: 6 ft 1 in (185 cm)
- Weight: middle/super middle/light heavy/cruiserweight

Boxing career

Boxing record
- Total fights: 41
- Wins: 26 (KO 21)
- Losses: 12 (KO 5)
- Draws: 3

Roy Gumbs (born 9 September 1954) is a Saint Kitts and Nevis/British professional middle/super middle/light heavy/cruiserweight boxer of the 1970s, '80s and '90s who won the British Boxing Board of Control (BBBofC) Southern (England) Area middleweight title, BBBofC British middleweight title, and Commonwealth middleweight title, and was a challenger for the International Boxing Federation (IBF) super middleweight title against Chong-Pal Park, his professional fighting weight varied from 157 1/2 lb (71.4 kg; 11 st 3.5 lb), i.e. middleweight to 178 1/2 lb (81.0 kg; 12 st 10.5 lb), i.e. cruiserweight.
