= Graciano Rocchigiani =

German boxer

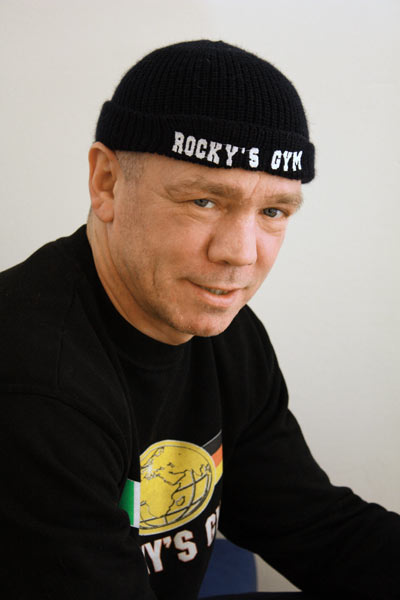
- Rocchigiani in 2009

Personal information
- Nickname: Rocky
- Nationality: German
- Born: 29 December 1963 Duisburg, North Rhine-Westphalia, West Germany
- Died: 1 October 2018 (aged 54) Belpasso, Italy
- Height: 1.85 m (6 ft 1 in)
- Weight: Middleweight; Super-middleweight; Light-heavyweight

Boxing career
- Reach: 189 cm (74 in)
- Stance: Southpaw

Boxing record
- Total fights: 48
- Wins: 41
- Win by KO: 19
- Losses: 6
- Draws: 1

Graciano Rocchigiani (29 December 1963 – 1 October 2018) was a German professional boxer who competed from 1983 to 2003. He held world championships in two weight classes, including the International Boxing Federation (IBF) super-middleweight title from 1988 to 1989, and the World Boxing Council (WBC) light-heavyweight title in 1998. At regional level he held the European light-heavyweight title from 1991 to 1992. He was the younger brother of former cruiserweight world champion of boxing, Ralf Rocchigiani.

== Professional career ==
Rocchigiani turned professional in 1983 after a successful amateur career in which he won the 1982 German National Amateur championship in the light-middleweight division. In 1988 he captured the vacant IBF super-middleweight title by stopping Vincent Boulware, and defended the title three times before vacating to step up to the light-heavyweight division. Despite becoming European champion, Rocchigiani failed to secure a world title shot at light-heavyweight and moved back down to super-middleweight in February 1994 to challenge WBO champion Chris Eubank in Berlin, Germany, losing a unanimous decision.

After boxing to a draw with Frederic Seillier for the European super-middleweight title in December 1994, Rocchigiani moved back up to light-heavyweight to challenge the 26-0 Henry Maske IBF title in May 1995 at the Arena Westfalenhalle, Dortmund, Nordrhein-Westfalen. He lost by a disputed unanimous decision despite having Maske reeling numerous times towards the end of the fight, and lost a rematch later in the year, again by unanimous decision. In August 1996 Rocchigiani lost via disqualification to WBO light-heavyweight title holder Dariusz Michalczewski after hitting Michalczewski on the break during round seven. Michalczewski's prolonged, theatrical reaction to the punch was seen by many as way of getting out of a fight he was losing. Initially the result was a technical draw, later changed to a disqualification.

Three weeks after the Michalczewski bout, it was reported that Rocchigiani had tested positive for traces of ephedrine and methylephedrine. However, the German boxing association did not request a follow-up test.

In March 1998, Rocchigiani captured the vacant WBC light-heavyweight title by defeating Michael Nunn by split decision at Max Schmeling Halle, Prenzlauer Berg, Berlin, but was demoted to "interim champion" three months later after the WBC inexplicably claimed its references in promotions and contracts to the Rocchigiani-Nunn fight as a championship bout, and to Rocchigiani as the champion in its rankings, had been "typographical errors". A match with WBC title holder Roy Jones Jr. was scheduled for November 1999 after Rocchigiani filed a lawsuit against Jones' promotional companies M&M Sports and Square Ring Promotions Inc due to Jones' reluctance to box Rocchigiani. However, the match was canceled by Jones' promoter Murad Muhammad after Rocchigiani missed a press conference. After initially threatening to strip Jones of his title if he didn't arrange another match with Rocchigiani, the WBC stripped Rocchigiani outright and removed him from their rankings due to inactivity, which prompted Rocchigiani to file a lawsuit against the WBC. Rocchigiani won the suit and he was awarded $31m by a federal judge. Rocchigiani would agree to the WBC's pleas for a smaller 10-year payment plan so the WBC could avoid bankruptcy.

Rocchigiani again challenged Michalczewski for the lineal and WBO titles at Preussag Arena, Hannover, Niedersachsen, Germany in April 2000. By this time Rocchigiani was an aging fighter and, despite a strong performance, he lost via corner retirement after nine rounds. After a short lived comeback in 2003 after a two-year layoff, he retired from boxing.

== Outside of boxing ==
Although he was a notable champion, Rocchigiani's most significant achievement was his victory in 2003 in the lawsuit against the WBC, in which he was awarded a $31 million judgment for damages over the loss of his light-heavyweight title. The court ruling also retroactively declared him champion from when he beat Nunn until his rematch defeat to Michalczewski. When the WBC announced its intentions to dissolve, he settled for an undisclosed sum.

In 2006, he was sentenced to five months in jail for assaulting a taxi driver.

Graciano was the younger brother of former WBO cruiserweight champion Ralf Rocchigiani, who also served as Graciano's trainer during the latter stages of his career.

He died on 1 October 2018 in Belpasso, Italy when he was run over by a car while taking a walk.

== Professional boxing record ==
48 fights	41 wins	6 losses
By knockout	19	1
By decision	22	4
By disqualification	0	1
Draws	1	

No.	Result	Record	Opponent	Type	Round, time	Date	Location	Notes
48	Loss	41–6–1	Thomas Ulrich	UD	12	10 May 2003	Hanns-Martin-Schleyer-Halle, Stuttgart, Germany	For vacant WBC International light-heavyweight title
47	Win	41–5–1	Willard Lewis	UD	8	10 Feb 2001	Estrel Hotel, Berlin, Germany	
46	Loss	40–5–1	Dariusz Michalczewski	TKO	10 (12), 3:00	15 Apr 2000	Preussag Arena, Hanover, Germany	For WBO light-heavyweight title
45	Win	40–4–1	Michael Nunn	SD	12	21 Mar 1998	Max-Schmeling-Halle, Berlin, Germany	Won vacant WBC light-heavyweight title
44	Win	39–4–1	John Scully	UD	10	22 Mar 1997	Max-Schmeling-Halle, Berlin, Germany	
43	Loss	38–4–1	Dariusz Michalczewski	DQ	7 (12), 3:00	10 Aug 1996	Wilhelm-Koch-Stadion, Hamburg, Germany	For WBO light-heavyweight title; Rocchigiani disqualified for punching after a clinch
42	Win	38–3–1	Pietro Pellizzaro	PTS	10	6 Apr 1996	Stadionsporthalle, Hanover, Germany	
41	Loss	37–3–1	Henry Maske	UD	12	14 Oct 1995	Olympiahalle, Munich, Germany	For IBF light-heavyweight title
40	Loss	37–2–1	Henry Maske	UD	12	27 May 1995	Westfalenhallen, Dortmund, Germany	For IBF light-heavyweight title
39	Draw	37–1–1	Frederic Seillier	PTS	12	10 Dec 1994	Sportforum Hohenschönhausen, Berlin, Germany	For European super-middleweight title
38	Win	37–1	Willie Kemp	KO	2	22 Oct 1994	Hansehalle, Lübeck, Germany	
37	Win	36–1	Charles Oliver	TKO	6 (10)	28 May 1994	Tivoli Eissporthalle, Aachen, Germany	
36	Loss	35–1	Chris Eubank	UD	12	5 Feb 1994	Deutschlandhalle, Berlin, Germany	For WBO super-middleweight title
35	Win	35–0	Ricky Thomas	PTS	8	15 Oct 1993	Sporthalle Schöneberg, Berlin, Germany	
34	Win	34–0	Kevin Whaley-El	TKO	6 (8)	11 Sep 1993	Tivoli Eissporthalle, Aachen, Germany	
33	Win	33–0	Lester Yarbrough	PTS	8	26 Jun 1993	Alsterdorfer Sporthalle, Hamburg, Germany	
32	Win	32–0	Alex Blanchard	TKO	9 (12)	13 Sep 1991	Düsseldorf, Germany	Retained European light-heavyweight title
31	Win	31–0	Crawford Ashley	SD	12	28 Feb 1991	Philips Halle, Düsseldorf, Germany	Won vacant European light-heavyweight title
30	Win	30–0	Mike Sedillo	PTS	8	7 Dec 1990	Berlin, Germany	
29	Win	29–0	Rodrigo Benech	KO	3 (10)	7 Sep 1990	Sporthalle Charlottenburg, West Berlin, West Germany	
28	Win	28–0	John Keys	KO	2, 2:15	1 Dec 1989	Hotel InterContinental, East Berlin, East Germany	
27	Win	27–0	Thulani Malinga	UD	12	27 Jan 1989	Deutschlandhalle, West Berlin, West Germany	Retained IBF super-middleweight title
26	Win	26–0	Chris Reid	TKO	11 (12), 2:39	7 Oct 1988	Deutschlandhalle, West Berlin, West Germany	Retained IBF super-middleweight title
25	Win	25–0	Nicky Walker	UD	15	3 Jun 1988	Deutschlandhalle, West Berlin, West Germany	Retained IBF super-middleweight title
24	Win	24–0	Vincent Boulware	TKO	8 (15), 2:11	11 Mar 1988	Philips Halle, Düsseldorf, West Germany	Won vacant IBF super-middleweight title
23	Win	23–0	Mustafa Hamsho	TKO	1, 1:02	5 Dec 1987	Philips Halle, Düsseldorf, West Germany	
22	Win	22–0	John Held	PTS	8	30 Oct 1987	Electoral Palace, Mainz, West Germany	
21	Win	21–0	Lahcen M'Hamdi	TKO	3	17 Oct 1987	Sporthalle, Gifhorn, West Germany	
20	Win	20–0	Tommy Taylor	PTS	8	3 Oct 1987	Zoo Safaripark, Schloß Holte-Stukenbrock, West Germany	
19	Win	19–0	Ahmed Laghlali	TKO	2	14 Sep 1987	Tennishalle, Bad Homburg, West Germany	
18	Win	18–0	Manfred Jassmann	PTS	12	3 Oct 1986	West Berlin, West Germany	Won German light-heavyweight title
17	Win	17–0	Ian Lazarus	KO	8 (8)	12 May 1986	Tennishalle, Bad Homburg, West Germany	
16	Win	16–0	James Cook	PTS	8	1 Mar 1986	Cologne, West Germany	
15	Win	15–0	Antoine Alcantara	KO	2	29 Nov 1985	Frankfurt, West Germany	
14	Win	14–0	Rudiger Bitterling	TKO	3	8 Nov 1985	Düsseldorf, West Germany	Won vacant German middleweight title
13	Win	13–0	Moussa Kassongo Mukandjo	UD	10	31 Aug 1985	West Berlin, West Germany	
12	Win	12–0	Steve Johnson	PTS	6	26 Apr 1985	Festhalle, Frankfurt, West Germany	
11	Win	11–0	Tony Jenkins	TKO	6 (8)	9 Mar 1985	Düsseldorf, West Germany	
10	Win	10–0	Philippe Seys	PTS	8	1 Dec 1984	Düsseldorf, West Germany	
9	Win	9–0	Tony Britton	PTS	8	5 Oct 1984	Frankfurt, West Germany	
8	Win	8–0	Butangi Nzolameso	PTS	6	15 Sep 1984	Dortmund, West Germany	
7	Win	7–0	Franz Dorfer	TKO	2	27 Apr 1984	West Berlin, West Germany	
6	Win	6–0	Mick Morris	UD	4	24 Feb 1984	Alsterdorfer Sporthalle, Hamburg, West Germany	
5	Win	5–0	Mauro Hernandez da Cruz	PTS	6	10 Feb 1984	Sporthalle Süd, Frankfurt, West Germany	
4	Win	4–0	Chaed Ringo	TKO	2	14 Jan 1984	Düsseldorf, West Germany	
3	Win	3–0	Jan Lefeber	PTS	4	5 Nov 1983	Mannheim, West Germany	
2	Win	2–0	Marnix Heytens	TKO	1	7 Oct 1983	Frankfurt, West Germany	
1	Win	1–0	Esperno Postl	TKO	2 (6)	10 Sep 1983	Cologne, West Germany	

== Titles in boxing ==
=== Major world titles ===
- IBF super-middleweight champion (168 lbs)
- WBC light-heavyweight champion (175 lbs)

=== Regional/International titles ===
- German middleweight champion (160 lbs)
- German light-heavyweight champion (175 lbs)
- European light-heavyweight champion (175 lbs)

== See also ==
- List of boxing families

Sporting positions
Regional boxing titles
Vacant Title last held by Georg Steinherr	German middleweight champion 8 November 1985 – October 1986; Vacated	Vacant Title next held by Andreas Prox
Preceded by Manfred Jassmann	German light-heavyweight champion 3 October 1986 – March 1988; Vacated	Vacant Title next held by Gerhard Schoberth
Vacant Title last held by Tom Collins	European light-heavyweight champion 28 February 1991 – September 1992; Vacated	Vacant Title next held by Eddy Smulders
World boxing titles
Vacant Title last held by Park Chong-pal	IBF super-middleweight champion 11 March 1988 – 22 September 1989; Vacated	Vacant Title next held by Lindell Holmes
Vacant Title last held by Roy Jones Jr.	WBC light-heavyweight champion 21 March 1998 – July 1998; Stripped	Succeeded by Roy Jones Jr.
