= Replay (sports) =

Repetition of a match in many sports

A replay (also called a rematch or refixture) is the repetition of a match in many sports. A replay is called either if an earlier game ended inconclusively (and that match need a conclusive result), or if a misapplication of rules occurred and the organizers ordered a replay to be done. A match can either be replayed in full, or from the point of contention.

== Association football ==
In association football, replays were often used to decide the winner in a knock-out tournament when the previous match ended in a draw, especially in finals. In 1970, FIFA (the worldwide governing body of the sport) and IFAB (the international rules committee for the sport) allowed penalty shoot-outs to be held if a match ended in a draw after extra time. The penalty shootout made its appearance immediately thereafter. The first instance of a shootout replacing a replay (rather than lots) was the final of the 1976 European championship. The shootout's first use at the World Cup took place in the 1982 semi-finals. Replays are now only used in the early rounds of the English FA Cup tournament. Games going to replays in the FA Cup since 1991 are only replayed once, with extra time and penalty shootouts used to decide the tie if the replay ends in a draw, with the lone exception being in the 1999–2000 FA Cup, when Wycombe Wanderers and Oxford City played a second replay after the first was abandoned due to a fire alarm going off just as the penalty shootout was commencing. Historically, FA Cup games would be replayed as many times as necessary until one team managed to win - in 1971, a fourth qualifying round match between Alvechurch and Oxford City was replayed five times after the initial match ended 2–2, with Alvechurch winning 1–0 in the fifth replay to settle the tie. On 18 April 2024, The Football Association announced that would scrap replays altogether from the first round of the competition proper of the FA Cup beginning from the 2024-25 edition to help ease fixture congestion for clubs competing in UEFA competitions, though replays will be retained during the qualifying phase of competition involving non-League clubs.

Replays can sometimes also take place on occasion if a team has fielded an ineligible player in the original match, or if a player has been injured as a result of an action by a spectator (such as throwing a coin or a bottle). However, more common consequences for such actions include awarding victory to non-offending teams and/or deducting points from offending teams.

== Baseball ==
Until 2007, in the rare event that a Major League Baseball game ended in a tie, it was replayed if necessary to decide postseason advancement. Tied games counted in statistical records, but were not counted in a team's win-loss percentage. Since 2007, tied games that must be abandoned for whatever reason are resumed (if feasible and/or necessary) from the point of suspension, as opposed to being replayed in full.

Until the 2020 Major League Baseball season, it was possible for teams to protest games, usually if the manager believed his team was harmed by a consequential umpiring decision that violated MLB rules. If the protest was upheld, the game would be replayed from the "point-of-protest" at a later date. In total, 15 MLB games were partially replayed under this rule, the last such occurrence happening in 2014. Most upheld protests were in the National League. The only case where the American League upheld a protest and ordered a replay was after the famous Pine Tar Incident in 1983. The rule was abolished after the 2019 MLB season, so protests and ensuing replays are no longer possible.

== Boxing ==
In boxing, rematches (referred to as "rematch" and not "replay", or simply by the match-up followed by a Roman numeral, as in Holyfield vs. Tyson II) are common and expected, producing historically significant moments in the sport. Examples include:

- Joe Louis and Max Schmeling (see: Joe Louis vs. Max Schmeling II)
- Jack Dempsey and Gene Tunney (see: The Long Count Fight)
- Sugar Ray Robinson and Jake LaMotta
- Muhammad Ali and Joe Frazier (see: Fight of the Century, Muhammad Ali vs. Joe Frazier II, Thrilla in Manila)
- Sugar Ray Leonard and Roberto Durán (see: The Brawl in Montreal, The No Mas Fight and Sugar Ray Leonard vs. Roberto Durán III)
- Muhammad Ali (Cassius Clay) and Sonny Liston (see Muhammad Ali vs. Sonny Liston II)
- Bobby Chacon and Rafael Limon (see: Bobby Chacon vs. Rafael Limón)
- Marco Antonio Barrera and Erik Morales (see Erik Morales vs. Marco Antonio Barrera, Marco Antonio Barrera vs. Erik Morales II and Erik Morales vs. Marco Antonio Barrera III)
- Arturo Gatti and Micky Ward
- Lennox Lewis and Evander Holyfield (see Evander Holyfield vs. Lennox Lewis and Evander Holyfield vs. Lennox Lewis II)
- Juan Manuel Márquez and Manny Pacquiao (see Juan Manuel Márquez vs. Manny Pacquiao II, Manny Pacquiao vs. Juan Manuel Márquez III and Manny Pacquiao vs. Juan Manuel Márquez IV)

== Gaelic games ==
Replays are often used as tiebreakers in the Gaelic games of hurling, Gaelic football, camogie and ladies' Gaelic football. Extra time, penalty shoot-outs and free-taking shootouts have, in recent years, been increasingly used as tiebreakers to prevent fixture congestion.

== Gridiron football ==
The National Football League has a clause in its rules that allows the commissioner to order a whole or partial replay of a game that has been corrupted by an "extraordinary act." For a partial replay, the game is reset to the point immediately before the play in which the act took place, with all game parameters (time, score, ball position and possession) set to where they were at that point. A full replay discards the result of the previous game altogether and restarts the game from its beginning.

As of 2026, the NFL has never used its extraordinary act clause. The rulebook states that the authority is only to be used in the event that "any club action, non-participant interference, or calamity occurs in an NFL game which the Commissioner deems so extraordinarily unfair or outside the accepted tactics encountered in professional football that such action has a major effect on the result of the game." Former commissioner Pete Rozelle refused on principle to use the provisions, notably after the notorious Snowplow Game. Under commissioner Roger Goodell, the league also opposes using the power, mainly because of the domino effect it could have on the rest of the schedule and the financial ramifications that would result. When this situation occurred in the aftermath of Damar Hamlin's on-field collapse in January 2023, it was decided instead to create an alternate playoff path for both the Buffalo Bills and Cincinnati Bengals, rather than replay the game.

== Notable replayed games ==
- The 1909 Scottish Cup Final resulted in a 2–2 draw between Celtic F.C. and Rangers F.C. When the replay resulted in a 1–1 draw, a riot ensued after the crowd learned extra time would not be played. As a result, a second replay was not held and the trophy was not awarded.
- The 1919 New York Pro Football League championship between the Buffalo Prospects and Rochester Jeffersons ended with Buffalo winning 20–0; the original match had ended in a scoreless tie.
- The 1932 NFL Playoff Game can be seen as a replay, since the two teams had tied earlier in the year and the extra game was needed to decide the league championship.
- The UEFA Euro 1968 Final between Italy and Yugoslavia ended 2–0; the original match ended in a 1–1 draw after extra time.
- The 51st National High School Baseball Championship Game (Japan) between Matsuyama Shogyo and Misawa ended 4–2; the original match was declared a 0–0 draw after 18 innings.
- A 1972 Louisiana High School Athletic Association Class AAAA football semifinal playoff between Monroe Neville and host New Orleans Brother Martin was replayed four days later after the game ended scoreless and both teams had the same number of first downs and penetrations inside the opponent's 20-yard line. Since there was no overtime provision in the National Federation of State High School Associations rules at the time (except in Kansas), the commissioner of the LHSAA ordered a new game after the suggestion to use a coin toss to determine the winner was vehemently rejected by both coaches. Neville won the replay, contested in a driving rain at Alexandria 8–0, and went on to defeat Bossier City Airline three days later for the state championship.
- The 1974 European Cup Final between FC Bayern Munich and Atlético Madrid ended 4–0; the original match ended in a 1–1 draw after extra time.
- Game four of the 1988 Stanley Cup Final between the Edmonton Oilers and the Boston Bruins was replayed in its entirety after the original game was suspended when a power failure hit Boston Garden after Craig Simpson of the Oilers had tied the game at 3-3 late in the second period. The replayed game four took the place of the scheduled (if necessary) game five, taking place at Northlands Coliseum in Edmonton, where the Oilers completed the sweep of the Bruins with a 6-3 victory. The suspended game is not recognized as a tie by the NHL, but the individual player statistics still count.
- The 1991 UAAP men's basketball championship between the De La Salle Green Archers and the FEU Tamaraws ended with FEU winning the game by forfeit; the original game ended with De La Salle winning 80–77. It was then ordered into a replay after FEU put the game under protest as a De La Salle player did not immediately leave the game after fouling out. De La Salle did not attend the replayed game, and FEU was awarded the championship by forfeit.
- The 1993 FA Cup Final between Arsenal and Sheffield Wednesday ended 2–1 after extra time; the original match ended in a 1–1 draw after extra time.
- The 88th National High School Baseball Championship Game (Japan) between Waseda Jitsugyo and Komadai Tomakomai ended 4–3; the original match was declared a 1–1 draw after 15 innings.
- The 1948 VFL Grand Final between Essendon and Melbourne was drawn 10.9 69 to 7.27 69, and the replay was comfortably won by Melbourne 13.11 89 to 7.8 50.
- The 1977 VFL Grand Final between Collingwood and North Melbourne ended in a 10.16 76 to 9.22 76 draw, and was replayed the following week, with North Melbourne taking the Premiership 21.15 151 to 19.10 124.
- The 2010 AFL Grand Final between Collingwood and St Kilda ended in a 9.14 (68) to 10.8 (68) draw, and was replayed the following week, with Collingwood taking the Premiership by winning 16.12 (108) to 7.10 (52). This would prove to be the last replayed AFL Grand Final, as from the 2016 season forward the league abolished Grand Final replays in favour of the use of two 5-minute overtime periods. If a Grand Final is tied at the end of the second overtime period, the siren that ends play will not be sounded until the next score by either team.
- The 1977 NSWRFL Grand Final between Parramatta and St. George ended in a 9–9 draw, and was replayed the following week with St. George winning 22–0.
- The 1978 NSWRFL Grand Final between Cronulla-Sutherland and Manly-Warringah ended in an 11–11 draw, and was replayed the following week with Manly-Warringah winning 16–0.
- Game 6 of the 2010 Japan Series between the Chunichi Dragons and the Chiba Lotte Marines ended tied 2–2 after 15 innings (in the longest game in the league's history: 5 hours, 43 minutes), and was replayed the following day with the Marines winning the game 8-7 and claiming the league championship 4 games to 2 (with 1 tie).
- In Gaelic games, the final matches of the All-Ireland championships in each individual sport are decided by replays in the event of a draw. As in the AFL before 2016, extra time is used only if the replay is also drawn at the end of regulation. The most recent replay in the top-level finals of each Gaelic sport was:
  - Men's football: In 2016, Dublin defeated Mayo 1–15 to 1–14 (18 points to 17) after the teams finished the original match level at 15 points (Dublin 2–9, Mayo 0–15).
  - Hurling: In 2013, Clare defeated Cork 5-16 to 3-16 (31 points to 25) after the teams finished the original match level at 25 points (Cork 3-16, Clare 0-25).
  - Ladies' football: In 1998, Waterford defeated Monaghan 2–14 to 3–8 (20 points to 17) after the teams finished the original match level at 19 points (Monaghan 4–7, Waterford 1–16).
  - Camogie (women): In 1981, Kilkenny defeated Cork 1–9 to 0–7 (12 points to 7) after the teams finished the original match level at 18 points (3–9 each).
- In the 1991 All-Ireland Senior Football Championship, the Dublin–Meath game required four matches for a winner to be found: the first game was a draw; the second was tied, and still tied after extra time; the third game was also drawn, and drawn after extra time; Meath won the fourth game.
- In the 1925 All-Ireland Senior Football Championship, the Roscommon–Sligo game required six matches for a winner to be found: Roscommon won the first game, but the result was overturned on an objection; the first three replays were all draws; Roscommon won the fourth replay, but the result was again overturned on an objection; and Sligo won the fifth replay.
