= Erik Morales vs. Marco Antonio Barrera =

Boxing match

Campeón vs Campeón
- Date: February 19, 2000
- Venue: Mandalay Bay Resort & Casino, Las Vegas, Nevada, U.S.
- Title(s) on the line: WBC and WBO super bantamweight titles

Tale of the tape
Boxer	Erik Morales	Marco Antonio Barrera
Nickname	El Terrible ("The Terrible")	The Baby-Faced Assassin
Hometown	Tijuana, Mexico	Mexico City, Mexico
Pre-fight record	35–0 (28 KO)	49–2 (1) (36 KO)
Age	23 years, 5 months	26 years, 1 month
Height	5 ft 8 in (173 cm)	5 ft 6 in (168 cm)
Weight	121 lb (55 kg)	121 1/2 lb (55 kg)
Style	Orthodox	Orthodox
Recognition	WBC; Super Bantamweight Champion; The Ring No. 10 ranked pound-for-pound fighter	WBO; Super Bantamweight Champion; The Ring No. 4 ranked pound-for-pound fighter

Result
- Morales wins via 12-round split decision (113–114, 114–113, 115–112)

Erik Morales vs. Marco Antonio Barrera, billed as Campeón vs. Campeón, was a professional boxing match contested on February 19, 2000, for the WBC and WBO super bantamweight championship. It took place at the Mandalay Bay Resort & Casino in Las Vegas, Nevada.

The fight was the first match in the Barrera vs. Morales trilogy. This is also regarded as the most technical fight out of the lot. Many people thought that Barrera should have had the victory and was a very controversial decision, which set up Marco Antonio Barrera vs. Erik Morales II on June 22, 2002, which Barrera won by Unanimous decision in again, controversial fashion

Critics have provided highly positive reviews from this fight. Barrera was the underdog at bookmakers for this fight with some pushing him as up to 5/1 to win the fight and Morales towards evens

== Background ==
Barrera had been the WBO super bantamweight champion in the mid 1990s. Morales, from his part, was undefeated and he had won the WBC super bantamweight title, knocking out Daniel Zaragoza (being the first person to do so) in eleven rounds in 1997. Promoters soon began arrangements for a bout between the WBC and WBO super bantamweight title holders.

Morales' record was 35–0 and he had defeated big names including Junior Jones, who defeated Barrera twice in 1996 and 97. He won his title in 1997 and had made 8 defenses prior to this fight. Barrera's only 2 losses came against Junior Jones, once by DQ and the other UD. He won his title by defeating Richie Wenton by 4th round TKO on October 31, 1998 and had made 2 defenses prior to this. The fight was televised on HBO's "Boxing after Dark" programme.

== The Fight ==
The first round began with Barrera throwing combinations, leading with his trademark left hook to the body. Morales's lanky, tall frame providing a perfect target against which to test Marco's attack. Barrera was fierce, while Morales stood his ground, throwing back punishing combos, using his killer right hand to punctuate them. After the referee cautions Morales on a seemingly low blow towards the end of the round, Barrera refuses to touch gloves to Morales's apology. Round two begins at a slightly slower pace, but soon picks it up. The combos start flowing from Barrera, while Morales deems it wise to counter Marco's violent onslaught by being even more violent himself. A particularly impressive combo from Barrera starts with the jab, followed by the right hand cross, and then the left hand uppercut that pushes upwards and backwards Morales's head. Morales was still struggling to match his opponent's level of intensity. Great counterpunching by Barrera in round three; when Morales plunges in, he gets caught with Barrera's left hook to the body, which stops him temporarily in his tracks. However, when "El Terrible" reacts, he comes back even fiercer, throwing three punch combinations to the head, taking a step to the side, and doing it again. All the while Barrera keeps his defense up and then goes on the attack himself. In round four, Morales lands a huge right hand on Barrera, and then falls victim to his own over-enthusiasm, as he loses balance while trying to land heavy shots, and hits the floor on a slip. Barrera quickly recovers. There's a sense that Barrera's experience is carrying him through, while Morales is still trying to adapt to being on such a big stage with such a highly skilled enemy in the ring. As they trade ripping shots after three minutes, round four goes to Morales. And then, there was round five.

This is as epic a round as any in boxing history in which neither fighter hit the canvas. Barrera hurts Morales with a flush right hand, who steps back against the ropes, and then fights Marco off. Toward the middle of the round, it's Morales who takes the initiative, landing all sorts of hooks and uppercuts on Barrera, making him step back. Barrera looks hurt, since Morales is able to throw over 20 punches with hardly any reply, even as Barrera still has his hands held up blocking some shots. After the half-minute attack by Morales, when Barrera was almost against the ropes, something suddenly lights up in him. Marco throws a hook to the body, steps around Morales, and sends him back against the ropes after landing a monstrous right hand flush on Erik's face. He lands a series of ripping punches which hurt Morales not only by their power, but by their unexpectedness. As there's still a full minute to go in the round, the Mandalay Bay erupts.

After a little breather by both, Morales starts his attack again. Later, Barrera lands a punch after the referee had indicated a break. Marco does not even attempt an apology. The ten second warning gives new life to the fighters, as they trade shots once more. But back in the action, at the start of six, the pace slows down some. It just had to. But not for long, as Morales takes the initiative once again, and keeps punishing Barrera with his powerful right hand. The previous round seems to have taken more out of Marco than of Erik. In round seven, we again see Barrera's masterful left hook to the body, which surprises Morales and makes him step back. The commentator mentions in passing that these guys' punches probably hurt "like the kick of a mule." Uppercuts by Marco, uppercuts from Morales. The fighters are more stationary now, inside an imaginary phone booth. They may not move around as much, but there's still punches aplenty. Morales's back hits the ropes as Barrera punches him square in the face with the right, but then Terrible comes on, throwing hooks and killer uppercuts to fight Barrera off. Wow. Barrera looks more tired than Morales at this point. He is the more experienced and probably the more skilled of these two, but he is also the older one. Nevertheless, he lands at least three major punches on Morales as the round ends.

In round eight Morales seems to be more active, but both land serious blows. Barrera's edge on experience comes to light towards the end of the round, as if by reflex, when he tries to steal the round with a wild barrage of punches, the stronger of which land cleanly on Morales. Erik looks somewhat frustrated in round nine. He has thrown everything he has at Barrera, and still Marco is the one who momentarily stuns Terrible within the first minute. The rest of the round, Morales plays catch up, trying to pull ahead by overworking Barrera. Erik tries his looping, hard right hand over the top, which he may have picked up on his win over living Mexican legend Daniel Zaragoza, in what was his biggest win at the time. Barrera may still have stolen the round in the final seconds with his violent, commonly late rally. In round ten it's more of the same, which means we get some more intense action. Barrera may be fading a little, but he remains game, always ready to punish Morales when he becomes too careless. Barrera looks weak on the legs towards the last minute, but then comes back and almost drops Morales. Terrible fights back though, punching wildly at Barrera to back him off. This is one of those fights that should go on until only one man is left standing. This kind of fight should not have to be decided by something as irrelevant as three scorecards. Round eleven is Morales's round, as he outworks Barrera, landing big right hands that stun Marco. Still, Barrera counterpunches, going strong against Morales's body, making him bend a little more noticeably in pain as he feels those hooks to the ribs. But Morales was the busier fighter in this round. In between rounds, we get a close up of Barrera's face, which shows a cut below the left eye, product of Morales's hard straight right hands.

As the final round begins, they touch gloves at the center of the ring. Barrera nods in acknowledgment of Terrible's performance so far. It's nothing but respect between these two at these point. But respect quickly turns to urgency from both fighters. As the commentators speak of the possibility, and probably the fairness, of the bout being scored a draw, Barrera and Morales trade vicious shots, as if trying to avoid the fight going the distance. They sense the scores are close, and they sense the end is near, but neither wants to leave anything to chance. They both want the knockout. It's Barrera who lands more and better punches after the initial whirlwind of activity. Morales steps back and decides to box a little all of a sudden. Marco's punches must feel even harder than they seem. Terrible gets his confidence back, goes on the offensive, and Marco plays counterpuncher. He uses his experience to win the territorial battle, trading shots when he wants to. Barrera hurts Morales with 45 seconds left. He lands one of his left hooks on Morales's chin, who backs up against the ropes. Morales holds on though, the ropes support him, and then he quickly steps to the side, trying to slip and duck while Marco is on the attack. Erik survives. He's still standing. He's still moving. Then, the referee decides to stir up controversy, as he rules a knockdown on what was mostly a slip by Morales with half a minute to go. Erik, who shows an abrasion and blood below his right eye, can't believe it. As the referee does the count, an upset Erik shakes his head. When the action resumes, Morales is on speed. Time is running out, and he just lost a point on the fake knockdown. So he throws his favorite punch, the straight right, wish lands flush on Barrera's face. He smothers Barrera with activity. Eighteen seconds left on the clock as Barrera fights Morales off with his left hand. They exchange punches mercilessly until the final bell.

Morales won the contest by split decision, with two judges scoring it 114-113 and 115-112 for Morales and the other scoring it 114-113 for Barrera. The fight was named The Ring Magazine 2000 Fight of the Year.

== Aftermath ==
The fighters would go on to fight twice more (Marco Antonio Barrera vs. Erik Morales II on June 22, 2002 and Erik Morales vs. Marco Antonio Barrera III on November 27, 2004). Barrera won them both. This exceptional fight boosted both fighters careers and they won numerous world titles. Both of them retired in 2012. The fight has been branded as the best fight ever by many.

== Undercard ==
Confirmed bouts:

== Broadcasting ==
Country	Broadcaster
United States	HBO

Preceded by vs. Cesar Nejera	Marco Antonio Barrera's bouts February 19, 2000	Succeeded by vs. Luiz Freitas
Preceded by vs. Wayne McCullough	Erik Morales' bouts February 19, 2000	Succeeded by vs. Mike Juárez
Awards
Preceded by Paulie Ayala W12 Johnny Tapia	The Ring Magazine Fight of the Year; 2000	Succeeded by Micky Ward W10 Emanuel Augustus
Preceded by Oscar De La Hoya vs. Ike Quartey; Round 6	The Ring Magazine Round of the Year; Round 5; 2000	Succeeded by Bernard Hopkins vs. Félix Trinidad; Round 10
