= Marco Antonio Barrera vs. Erik Morales II =

Boxing match

For Honor and Pride
- Date: June 22, 2002
- Venue: MGM Grand Garden Arena, Las Vegas, Nevada, U.S.
- Title(s) on the line: WBC and vacant The Ring featherweight titles

Tale of the tape
| Boxer | Marco Antonio Barrera | Erik Morales |
| Nickname | "The Baby Faced Assassin" | El Terrible ("The Terrible") |
| Hometown | Mexico City, Mexico | Tijuana, Baja California, Mexico |
| Pre-fight record | 54–3 (1) (39 KO) | 41–0 (28 KO) |
| Age | 28 years, 5 months | 25 years, 9 months |
| Height | 5 ft 7 in (170 cm) | 5 ft 8 in (173 cm) |
| Weight | 126 lb (57 kg) | 126 lb (57 kg) |
| Style | Orthodox | Orthodox |
| Recognition | Lineal; Featherweight Champion; WBA; No. 3 Ranked Featherweight; The Ring No. 4 ranked pound-for-pound fighter | WBC; Featherweight Champion; 2-division world champion |

Result
- Barrera wins via 12-round unanimous decision (116-112, 115-113, 115-113)

Marco Antonio Barrera vs. Erik Morales II, billed as For Honor and Pride, was a professional boxing match between then three-time super bantamweight and reigning lineal featherweight world champion Marco Antonio Barrera and WBC featherweight world champion Erik Morales. It took place on June 22, 2002, at the MGM Grand Garden Arena in Las Vegas, Nevada. Barrera won the contest by unanimous decision, with two judges scoring it 115-113 and the other scoring it 116-112 for Barrera.

The fight is the second match in the highly regarded Barrera vs. Morales trilogy, with Morales winning the first fight. This is also regarded as the most technical fight out of the lot. Many people thought that Morales should have had the victory and was a very controversial decision, which set up Erik Morales vs. Marco Antonio Barrera III on November 27, 2004, which Barrera won by Majority decision

The fight was made a PPV due to the success of the previous fight and was televised through a pay-per-view produced by HBO. The fight gained 300,000 purchases.

Rather like the previous fight, critics have provided highly positive reviews from this fight. Morales was the underdog at bookmakers for this fight due to his previous loss of form and slack, even though he was still winning, after the first fight between these two in 2000.

== Background ==
Barrera had been the WBO super bantamweight champion in the mid 1990s. Morales, from his part, was undefeated and he had won the WBC super bantamweight title, knocking out Daniel Zaragoza (being the first person to do so) in eleven rounds in 1997. Promoters soon began arrangements for a bout between the WBC and WBO super bantamweight title holders.

The first bout took place on February 19, 2000, at the Mandalay Bay Resort and Casino, in Las Vegas and was televised on HBO Boxing. Morales was declared winner by split decision, with scores of 115-112, 114-113 and 113-114 and captured the WBO Super Bantamweight title. Many believed that Barrera deserved the decision. This bout was named as Ring Magazine's Fight of the Year for 2000, before being named as the best Fight of all time in the same year.

Following the first fight, Morales won 5 fights, though some unconvincingly. His first fight was against Michael Leroy Juarez on June 17, 2000, which Morales won by KO in the third round. He next faced Kevin Kelley for the interim WBC Featherweight title on September 2, 2000, which he won by TKO in round 7. He then faced Rodney Jones on December 9, 2000 and defeated him via first round KO. As the interim champion, he faced the reigning champion, Guty Espadas, Jr. on February 17, 2001. He won this fight by unanimous decision thus becoming the WBC featherweight champion. His first defence came against In-Jin Chi on July 31, 2001, which he also won by UD.

Although Barrera lost the first fight, Morales moved up to the featherweight division, therefore Barrera was reinstated as the WBO super-bantamweight champion and also had 5 fights. The first of these was a title defense against Luiz Freitas on June 17, 2000, the same night as Morales had his return fight also. Barrera won this by KO in the first round. His second defense was against Jose Luis Valbuena on September 9, 2000, which he won via 6th round TKO. His third defense was against Jesus Salud on December 1, 2000 which he also won by TKO in round 6. His next fight was a mega fight against undefeated British fighter Naseem Hamed on April 7, 2001. Barrera won this by UD, therefore handing Hamed his first and only loss, alongside winning the Lineal featherweight title, Barrera's first major title. His first defense of that was against Enrique Sanchez on 8 September 2001, which he won after Sanchez retired at the end of round 6.

== The fight ==
The fight was considered the most technical of the three Barrera-Morales fights. Morales constantly pressed forward and dominated much of the first half of the fight (clearly winning at least 4 of the first 6 rounds). He was cut on the bridge of the nose in the 2nd round, and cut and swollen over his right eye in the 8th. However, he punched Barrera to the canvas during the middle rounds but this was correctly called a slip. Barrera fought cautiously in the early rounds, but rallied as the fight progressed, although Morales seemed to narrowly win rounds 10 and 11, which when including his dominance in the first half of the fight, seemed to seal him the close victory on the score-cards. HBO's unofficial ring-side scorer: Harold Lederman, scored the fight 115–113 (7 rounds to 5) for Morales however Barrera was given the decision by all 3 judges and therefore won the WBC and The Ring and retaining the lineal featherweight titles. Barrera declined the WBC title though and this became vacant.

== Aftermath ==
Following this fight, Morales was dominant in his next six fights, going 6-0 (3 KO) and winning belts against Paulie Ayala at featherweight, then Jesús Chávez and Carlos Hernández at super featherweight. Barrera, though was stripped of the WBC belt months later, continued defending his Ring title twice, winning a unanimous decision over Johnny Tapia and scoring multiple knockdowns en route to a fourth round TKO over Kevin Kelley, before suffering his worst defeat to Manny Pacquiao in his third defense, losing the Ring title. Barrera then went on to score a tenth round TKO over Paulie Ayala in 19 June, going with a record of 3-1 (1 KO) prior to the eventual meeting.

The rubber match between Morales and Barrera was set up for 27 November, in which the fight was undisputedly won by the latter unlike the first two fights, winning via majority decision.

== Undercard ==
Confirmed bouts:

== Broadcasting ==
| Country | Broadcaster |
|---|---|
| Canada | Viewers Choice |
| United States | HBO |

| Preceded by vs. Enrique Sánchez | Marco Antonio Barrera's bouts June 22, 2002 | Succeeded by vs. Johnny Tapia |
| Preceded by vs. Chi In-jin | Erik Morales's bouts June 22, 2002 | Succeeded by vs. Paulie Ayala |
