= Manny Pacquiao vs. Marco Antonio Barrera II =

Boxing match

Will to Win
- Date: October 6, 2007
- Venue: Mandalay Bay Events Center, Paradise, Nevada, U.S.
- Title(s) on the line: WBC International super featherweight title

Tale of the tape
Boxer	Manny Pacquiao	Marco Antonio Barrera
Nickname	"Pac-Man"	"Baby-Faced Assassin"
Hometown	General Santos, Soccsksargen, Philippines	Mexico City, Mexico
Purse	$2,000,000	
Pre-fight record	44–3–2 (35 KO)	63–5 (1) (42 KO)
Age	28 years, 9 months	33 years, 8 months
Height	5 ft 6 1/2 in (169 cm)	5 ft 6 in (168 cm)
Weight	130 lb (59 kg)	130 lb (59 kg)
Style	Southpaw	Orthodox
Recognition	WBA/WBC/WBO/The Ring; No. 1 Ranked Super Featherweight; WBC International super featherweight champion The Ring No. 2 ranked pound-for-pound fighter 3-division world champion	WBC/The Ring; No. 3 Ranked Super Featherweight; 3-division world champion

Result
- Pacquiao wins via 12-round unanimous decision (118-109, 118-109, 115-112)

Manny Pacquiao vs. Marco Antonio Barrera II, billed as Will to Win, was a professional boxing match contested on October 6, 2007, for the WBC International super featherweight championship.

== Background ==
The bout took place at the Mandalay Bay, Las Vegas, Nevada, United States and was distributed by HBO PPV. The two had previously fought in November 2003 with Pacquiao stopping Barrera after 11 rounds.

The fight was announced after Top Rank and Golden Boy Promotions settled their lawsuit over the promotional rights for Pacquiao fights on June 29, 2007.

== The fight ==
Barrera came out smarter in this fight as he survived up to the final round but Pacquiao easily outboxed him throughout the fight. Pacquiao defeated Barrera via unanimous decision. Two judges scored the bout 118–109, whereas the third scored it 115–112.

== Aftermath ==
Barrera briefly retired after the fight but returned over a year later in November 2008 to face Sammy Ventura.

== Undercard ==
Confirmed bouts:

== Broadcasting ==
Country	Broadcaster
United States	HBO

Preceded by vs. Jorge Solís	Manny Pacquiao's bouts 6 October 2007	Succeeded by vs. Juan Manuel Márquez II
Preceded by vs. Juan Manuel Márquez	Marco Antonio Barrera's bouts 6 October 2007	Succeeded by vs. Sammy Ventura
