= Marco Antonio Barrera vs. Manny Pacquiao =

Boxing match

Destined for Greatness
- Date: November 15, 2003
- Venue: Alamodome, San Antonio, Texas, U.S.
- Title(s) on the line: The Ring featherweight title

Tale of the tape
Boxer	Marco Antonio Barrera	Manny Pacquiao
Nickname	The Baby-Faced Assassin	Pac-Man
Hometown	Mexico City, Distrito Federal, Mexico	General Santos, Soccsksargen, Philippines
Purse		$350,000
Pre-fight record	57–3 (1) (40 KO)	37–2–1 (28 KO)
Age	29 years, 9 months	24 years, 10 months
Height	5 ft 6 in (168 cm)	5 ft 5 1/2 in (166 cm)
Weight	126 lb (57 kg)	125 lb (57 kg)
Style	Orthodox	Southpaw
Recognition	The Ring; Featherweight Champion; WBA/IBF; No. 1 Ranked Featherweight; The Ring No. 3 ranked pound-for-pound fighter	IBF; Super Bantamweight Champion; The Ring; No. 1 Ranked Super Bantamweight; 2-division world champion

Result
- Pacquiao wins by 11th-round TKO

Marco Antonio Barrera vs. Manny Pacquiao, billed as Destined for Greatness, was a professional boxing match contested on November 15, 2003, for the lineal and The Ring featherweight championship.

== Background ==
Following his victory over Naseem Hamed to win the lineal featherweight title in April 2001, Marco Antonio Barrera had made four successful defences, having added The Ring title in 2002 rematch with Erik Morales.

Meanwhile Manny Pacquiao, who had made four defences of the IBF super bantamweight belt he had won from Lehlo Ledwaba in June 2001, had spent the past year pursuing a fight with Barrera. His manager Rod Nazario saying "Pacquiao really wanted this fight. He has been asking for this one since last year but we didn’t push for it because we wanted them to come up first with the offer".

Barrera was a 3–1 favourite to win.

This was Barrera's first bout promoted by Golden Boy Promotions following his split with Forum Boxing.

== The fight ==
Within the first 30 seconds of the bout, Pacquiao slipped to the canvas after Barrera had missed with a punch, which referee Laurence Cole incorrectly ruled as a knockdown. From the 2nd round onwards however Pacquiao was in control setting a fast pace in order to tire the champion, landing combinations to the body and head set up with his hard right jab. At the start of the 3rd, a straight left hand set Barrera down. He beat the count but Pacquiao would continue to dominate. A cut over Barrera's left eye opened up after an unintentional head butt in the 6th round, he would also be deducted a point in the 9th for hitting on the break. Pacquiao would drop Barrera for a second time in the 11th, he beat the count but later in the round he would be trapped on the ropes with the challenger landing a barrage of unanswered punches would prompted Barrera's corner to throw in the towel giving Pacquiao a TKO victory.

At the time of the stoppage Pacquiao led on all three scorecards, with two scores of 97–90 and one of 97–89.

HBO's unofficial scorer Harold Lederman had the bout scored 98–89 for Pacquiao.

== Aftermath ==
Speaking after the bout Pacquiao said "I'm surprised he lasted that long. Very early on I knew I was going to knock him out."

"Tonight wasn't my night; there were a lot of distractions before this fight," Barrera conceded to HBO's Larry Merchant, "He punches hard and he's a great fighter, I couldn't see a lot of things. I don't know what went wrong, but that wasn't me in there."

Mentioned potential next opponents for Pacquiao were Erik Morales, Juan Manuel Márquez, Oscar Larios and Paulie Ayala.

With the victory Pacquiao had the first Filipino and Asian to become a three-division world champion.

On November 24, 2003, then Philippine President Gloria Macapagal Arroyo conferred on Pacquiao the Presidential Medal of Merit at the Ceremonial Hall of Malacañang Palace for his knockout victory over the best featherweight boxer in the world. The following day, the members of the House of Representatives of the Philippines presented the House Resolution No. 765, authored by the then House Speaker Jose De Venecia and Bukidnon Representative Migz Zubiri, which honored Pacquiao the Congressional Medal of Achievement for his exceptional achievements. Pacquiao was the first sportsman to receive such an honor from the House of Representatives.

== Undercard ==
Confirmed bouts:

== Broadcasting ==
Country	Broadcaster
Mexico	TV Azteca
Philippines	Solar Sports
United Kingdom	BBC
United States	HBO

Preceded by vs. Kevin Kelley	Marco Antonio Barrera's bouts 15 November 2003	Succeeded by vs. Paulie Ayala
Preceded by vs. Emmanuel Lucero	Manny Pacquiao's bouts 15 November 2003	Succeeded by vs. Juan Manuel Márquez
