= Erik Morales vs. Marco Antonio Barrera III =

Boxing match

Once and for All
- Date: November 27, 2004
- Venue: MGM Grand Garden Arena, Las Vegas, Nevada, U.S.
- Title(s) on the line: WBC super featherweight title

Tale of the tape
Boxer	Erik Morales	Marco Antonio Barrera
Nickname	El Terrible ("The Terrible")	"The Baby-Faced Assassin"
Hometown	Tijuana, Baja California, Mexico	Mexico City, Mexico
Pre-fight record	47–1 (34 KO)	58–4 (1) (41 KO)
Age	28 years, 2 months	30 years, 10 months
Height	5 ft 8 in (173 cm)	5 ft 6 in (168 cm)
Weight	130 lb (59 kg)	129 1/2 lb (59 kg)
Style	Orthodox	Orthodox
Recognition	WBC; Super Featherweight Champion; The Ring; No. 1 Ranked Super Featherweight; The Ring No. 5 ranked pound-for-pound fighter 3-division world champion	WBC; No. 3 Ranked Featherweight; WBA; No. 4 Ranked Featherweight; The Ring; No. 2 Ranked Featherweight; Former featherweight champion

Result
- Barrera wins via 12-round majority decision (114-114, 115-114, 115-113)

Erik Morales vs. Marco Antonio Barrera III, billed as Once and For All, was a professional boxing match between the then 2-division world champion Marco Antonio Barrera and reigning WBC super featherweight world champion Erik Morales. It took place on November 27, 2004, at the MGM Grand Garden Arena in Las Vegas, Nevada.

The fight is the final match in the Barrera vs. Morales trilogy.

== Background ==
Barrera had been the WBO super bantamweight champion in the mid 1990s. Morales, from his part, was undefeated and he had won the WBC super bantamweight title, knocking out Daniel Zaragoza in eleven rounds in 1997. Promoters soon began arrangements for a bout between the WBC and WBO super bantamweight title holders.

The first bout took place on February 19, 2000, at the Mandalay Bay Resort and Casino, in Las Vegas and was televised on HBO Boxing. Morales was declared winner by split decision, with scores of 115-112, 114-113 and 113-114 and captured the WBO Super Bantamweight title. Many believed that Barrera deserved the decision. This bout was named as Ring Magazine's Fight of the Year for 2000, before being named as the best fight of all time in the same year.

The second bout took place on June 22, 2002, in MGM Grand Las Vegas, Las Vegas. After the impact their first fight had on many of those that saw it, their second fight was made a Pay Per View event. This is often described as the most tactical fight of the trilogy. Nevertheless, there were plenty of punches, but with Barrera fighting a more technical approach, Morales opted to use heavier punches, dropping Barrera to the canvas in the 7th with a blow to the abdomen which was subsequently ruled a trip by referee Jay Nady. Barrera was nonetheless declared the winner by unanimous decision, with scores of 116-112 and 115-113 and captured the WBC Featherweight title. Many believed that Morales deserved the decision.

== The fight ==
The early exchanges suggested Barrera was coping just fine beating Morales to the punch, firing more accurate shot and mixing his attacks to the body and head. Barrera won five of the first six rounds giving Morales a boxing lesson in the process. Morales boxes better from range but he simply could not get his jab going and allowed Barrera to slip inside to deliver shorter, snappier combinations with his shorter arms.

Rounds 7 and 8 saw a change with Morales finally connecting with his chopping right hand and for the first time Barrera felt that extra 11 lb of power. Barrera rallied strongly in 9 and 10 to reassert his commanding lead. Rounds 11 and 12 were incredible. Morales knew he had to go for a knockout while Barrera’s corner were telling him he had to keep letting rip. Neither fighter disappointed with blistering toe-to-toe exchanges throughout the final rounds. Usually whenever these two get into a brawl Barrera gets the better of it but Morales was finally showing what a great fighter he is, raining down shots on the exhausted Barrera who responded ferociously with left hooks to the ribs and face.

The scoring was closer than you might have imagined, one judge scoring the fight even, the other two giving one-round and two-round victories to Barrera. HBO's unofficial ringside scorer Harold Lederman scored the fight in Barrera's favor 115–113.

Barrera won the contest by majority decision, with two judges scoring it 115-113 and 115-114 for Barrera and the other 114-114.

As the announcement came the hostilities between the fighters continued with a shouting match between the two. As Barrera was announced victor he held up two fingers to Morales and shouted "dos!" (two) to indicate his two victories over him.

== Aftermath ==
The fight was televised through a pay-per-view produced by HBO. The fight gained 325,000 purchases.

Rather like the previous two fights, critics have provided highly positive reviews from this fight. The fight was named the 2004 Ring Magazine Fight of the Year.

== Undercard ==
Confirmed bouts:

== Broadcasting ==
Country	Broadcaster
Australia	Main Event
Canada	Viewers Choice
Hungary	Sport 1
Mexico	Televisa
Philippines	Solar Sports / RPN 9
United Kingdom	Sky Sports
United States	HBO

Preceded by vs. Paulie Ayala	Marco Antonio Barrera's bouts November 27, 2004	Succeeded by vs. Mzonke Fana
Preceded by vs. Carlos Hernández	Erik Morales' bouts November 27, 2004	Succeeded by vs. Manny Pacquiao
Awards
Preceded by Arturo Gatti vs. Micky Ward III	The Ring Magazine Fight of the Year; 2004	Succeeded by José Luis Castillo vs. Diego Corrales
Preceded by Vassiliy Jirov vs. James Toney	Harry Markson Award; 2004	Succeeded by José Luis Castillo vs. Diego Corrales
Preceded by Acelino Freitas vs. Jorge Rodrigo Barrios; Round 11	The Ring Magazine Round of the Year; Round 5; 2004	Succeeded by José Luis Castillo vs. Diego Corrales; Round 10
