= Marco Antonio Barrera =

Mexican boxer (born 1974)

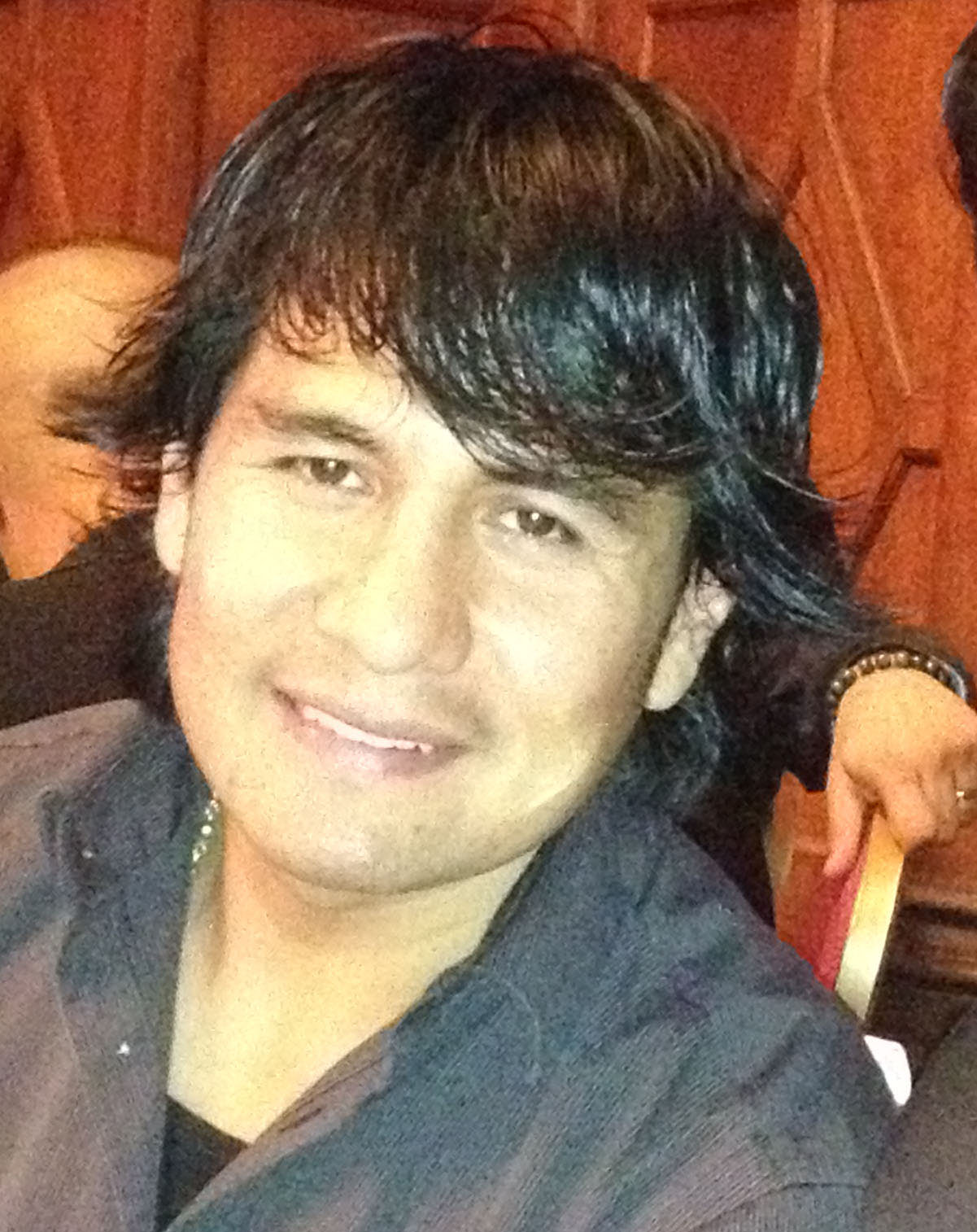
- Barrera in 2012

Personal information
- Nicknames: Baby-Faced Assassin; El Barreta; El Baron
- Born: Marco Antonio Barrera Tapia; January 17, 1974 (age 52) Mexico City, Mexico
- Height: 5 ft 6 in (168 cm)
- Weight: Super flyweight; Super bantamweight; Featherweight; Super featherweight; Lightweight

Boxing career
- Reach: 70 in (178 cm)
- Stance: Orthodox

Boxing record
- Total fights: 75
- Wins: 67
- Win by KO: 44
- Losses: 7
- No contests: 1

Marco Antonio Barrera Tapia (born January 17, 1974) is a Mexican former professional boxer who competed from 1989 to 2011. He held multiple world championships in three weight classes between 1995 and 2007, from super bantamweight to super featherweight.

After a brief retirement after losing twice to Junior Jones, Barrera revived his career with a trilogy against Erik Morales and a win against Naseem Hamed, earning him the Ring magazine featherweight title. He lost this title in his first fight against Manny Pacquiao. BoxRec currently ranks Barrera 55th in its list of the greatest boxers of all time, pound for pound, while ESPN ranked Barrera as 43rd on their list of the 50 greatest boxers of all time. He was inducted into the International Boxing Hall of Fame in 2017.

== Amateur career ==
As an amateur, Barrera had a record of 104–4 and was a five-time Mexican national champion. Before losing his first amateur contest, Barrera had an undefeated record of 56–0.

== Professional career ==
=== Super flyweight ===
Barrera made his professional debut at 15 when he defeated David Felix by a knockout in round two on November 22, 1989. The victory marked the beginning of a 43 fight win streak.

In 1990, Barrera had seven fights, including his first rise in quality opposition, when he defeated veteran Iván Salazar, by a decision in eight rounds. In 1991, he had seven more fights, defeating boxers Abel Hinojosa, Javier Díaz and others.

Barrera began 1992 by winning his first professional title, defeating Justino Suárez by a decision in twelve rounds to win the Mexican super flyweight championship. He retained the title three times before the end of the year which helped improved his ranking in the super flyweight division. He defeated Abner Barajas by a decision in ten rounds, and Angel Rosario by a knockout in six rounds.

In 1993, Barrera had six bouts, winning each. He defeated Salazar in a rematch and retained his title against Noe Santillana and among others.

By 1994, Barrera was attending university to become a lawyer and also continued his boxing career. On April 13, he defeated future champion Carlos Salazar by a ten-round decision in Argentina. He also defeated former world champion Eddie Cook before the end of the year.

=== Super bantamweight ===
==== First world title ====
Barrera began 1995 by fighting for a world title. On March 31, he became the WBO super bantamweight champion by defeating Puerto Rican boxer Daniel Cobrita Jiménez by a decision in twelve rounds at Anaheim, California. By this time, many boxing journalist were calling Barrera "Mexico's next Julio César Chávez."

He made four defenses before the year was over. On June 2, 1995, he defeated future champion Frank Toledo via second round knock out. Barrera knocked Toledo down twice before the fight was stopped.

On July 15, 1995, Barrera scored a first-round knockout win over Maui Díaz (27–1). In his next bout, he won a twelve-round unanimous decision over future champion Agapito Sánchez.

On February 6, 1996, he fought on the first installment of HBO Boxing's spin-off series "HBO Boxing After Dark." In one of the fights of the year, Barrera stopped Kennedy McKinney in 12 rounds, knocking him down five times whilst suffering one knockdown himself.

After the McKinney fight, he defeated former WBO champion Jesse Benavides by third-round knockout. On July 14, 1996, he defeated another former champion, Orlando Fernandez, by seventh-round TKO.

==== Defeat by Junior Jones ====
On November 22, 1996, he suffered his first career loss and lost his title to American boxer Junior Jones, by a disqualification in round five. Barrera was knocked down in Round 5 by Jones, and was declared the loser by disqualification and not by knockout because Barrera's cornerman climbed onto the ring to stop the fight as Jones was finishing Barrera.

On April 18, 1997, he was given a chance to regain his title, facing Jones in a rematch in Las Vegas. Barrera was defeated by a unanimous decision that fans thought was controversial, but retired from boxing nonetheless regardless of the opinions of his die-hard fans.

==== Comeback trail ====
Barrera announced a comeback in 1998, a year later, and he started off by defeating Angel Rosario by a knockout in round five. After two more wins, he was given another opportunity to fight for a world title by the WBO. On October 31, he became a two-time world super bantamweight champion by defeating Richie Wenton by a knockout in three rounds, winning the WBO's vacant title.

In 1999, he had two title defenses and then he ran into controversy. On December 18, he defeated César Najera in four rounds at California. But upon finding out that Najera had a losing record and was part of Barrera's team, the California State Athletic Commission decided to rule the fight a no contest bout.

==== Barrera vs. Morales I ====
In February 2000, Barrera was defeated by the WBC super bantamweight title holder Erik Morales by a controversial 12 round split decision. It was an intense battle in which both fighters were cut and battered. The Ring named it the fight of the year.

After the bout, the WBO reinstated Barrera as their champion and he defended the title three additional times. On June 17, 2000, he defeated Luiz Freitas (19–1–0) by first-round knockout. In his next bout, he defeated José Luis Valbuena (18–1–1) by twelve round unanimous decision. On December 1, 2000, he scored a sixth-round knockout over former world champion Jesús Salud.

=== Featherweight ===
==== Barrera vs. Hamed ====
In 2001, Barrera moved up in weight division. On April 7, he handed British boxer Naseem Hamed his first and only loss for the lineal featherweight championship by a twelve-round decision. Before the fight, Hamed was a 3 to 1 betting favorite in Las Vegas. Hamed could not hit Barrera with his trademark lefts as Barrera circled to his left and worked both head and body. Barrera was not a fan of Hamed's antics and responded to Hamed's punches during clinches. On one occasion early in the fight, Hamed grabbed Barrera and they both fell to the ground where Barrera threw a right jab, leading to a warning from referee Joe Cortez. In the 12th and final round Barrera trapped Hamed in a full nelson and forced his head into the turnbuckle, resulting in a point deducted by referee Joe Cortez. Ultimately, Barrera threw more, harder punches and more impressive combinations than Hamed throughout the course of the fight. Barrera was awarded the victory via a unanimous decision, with the scorecards reading 115–112, 115–112, 116–111 and won the lineal and IBO featherweight titles. On September 8, 2001, he defeated former champion Enrique Sánchez by sixth-round TKO.

==== Barrera vs. Morales II ====
On June 22, 2002, Barrera defeated Morales in a rematch via a unanimous decision, successfully defending his lineal title and winning the vacant Ring magazine title but declined Morales' the WBC belt. On November 2, he defeated former five-time world champion Johnny Tapia by a 12-round unanimous decision. Barrera then competed in his 60th career fight on 12 April 2003, defeating former WBC title holder Kevin Kelley by knockout in round four.

==== Barrera vs. Pacquiao I ====
On November 16, 2003, Barrera was defeated by Filipino boxer Manny Pacquiao in the eleventh round when Barerra's corner threw in the towel, earning Pacquiao his third world championship in third weight division (Barrera was the recognized lineal champion and his Ring Magazine title was also on the line when he fought Pacquiao).

On June 19, 2004, Barrera defeated former WBA bantamweight title holder Paulie Ayala in Los Angeles by a tenth-round knockout.

=== Super featherweight ===
==== Barrera vs. Morales III ====
On November 27, 2004, Barrera fought Morales for the third time and became a three-division world champion by defeating Morales in a majority decision to capture the WBC super featherweight title.

On April 9, 2005, Barrera retained the title with a second-round knockout against future champion Mzonke Fana in El Paso, Texas, this win also marked Barrera's 60th career win.

On September 17 of the same year, he unified his WBC super featherweight title with the IBF title by defeating the IBF title holder Robbie Peden by a twelve-round unanimous decision in Las Vegas.

==== Barrera vs. Juárez ====
On May 20, 2006, Barrera defended his title against American boxer Rocky Juárez with what was announced immediately after the fight as a twelve-round draw, which the judges scored 115–113, 113–115 and 114–114. However, tabulation errors were found in the judges' scorecards, leading to a final score of 115–114, 114–115 and 115–114, a split decision in favor of Barerra. He fought Juárez in a rematch bout on September 16, this time Barrera won by a unanimous decision with scores of (117–111, 115–113, 115–113).

==== Barrera vs. Márquez ====
On March 17, 2007, Barrera lost his WBC super featherweight title to fellow Mexican boxer Juan Manuel Márquez by unanimous decision. Even without counting a knockdown of Marquez that was ruled a slip by referee Jay Nady in the 7th round, Harold Lederman of HBO had the fight in favor of Barrera. Barrera claimed that the judges and referee were wrong.

==== Barrera vs. Pacquiao II ====
Barrera fought Pacquiao in a rematch bout for the WBC International super featherweight title on October 6, 2007, in Las Vegas. Barrera was defeated by a unanimous decision with scores of 118–109, 118–109, 115–112. After the match, Barrera expressed his desire to retire from boxing, however no official confirmation had been given. On February 13, 2008, Barrera announced to the media that he would fight the winner of the Márquez vs. Pacquiao bout on March 15. The winner of this turned out to be Pacquiao, in a split decision. However, Pacquiao's move to the lightweight division and subsequent capture of the WBC lightweight title ensured that a third fight between the two would not happen.

=== Lightweight ===
Marco Antonio Barrera, at 35, ended his brief retirement and signed a five-year contract on August 26, 2008, with promoter Don King. He moved up to the lightweight division, his goal to become the first Mexican ever to win a title in 4 different weight divisions.

On November 7, 2008, Barrera marked his return to the ring, in Chengdu, China, by knocking out Sammy Ventura in his first bout in the lightweight division.

==== Barrera vs. Khan ====
It was announced on January 15, 2009, that Barrera would return to the ring against British boxer Amir Khan. Even with Barrera getting on in years, this was seen to be the biggest test of the young Briton's career thus far. Frank Warren promoted the fight, which took place on March 14, 2009, at the MEN Arena.

Barrera lost the bout by a fifth-round technical decision. In the first round, the two fighters clashed heads, resulting in a deep gash above Barrera's forehead, which bled throughout the bout. Ringside doctors stopped the fight at the beginning of the fifth round due to the severity of the cut. The judges scored the fight 50–45, 50–45 and 50–44 for Khan at the point of stoppage and he was declared the winner by technical decision. However, there was some controversy over the time of the stoppage, as Barrera had sustained the cut during the first round and that it would be constantly examined before the referee officially stopped the fight in the fifth round.

On March 26, 2009, as a result of the controversial stoppage timing, Barrera's promoter, Don King, filed a protest with the British Boxing Board of Control, WBA and WBO on behalf of Barrera, claiming the accidental clash of heads should have resulted in the fight being ruled a no-contest. Under the rules governing the bout, had the fight been stopped prior to the end of the fourth round due to the accidental headbutt, the official ruling would have been no contest, requiring an immediate rematch. Referee Dave Parris, however, waited until midway through the fourth round before asking the ringside physician to inspect the wound.

Before this fight, Barrera had fought Freudis Rojas on January 31, 2009, in Zapopan, Jalisco. Rojas was disqualified for a headbutt which left Barrera with a bad cut over his left eye. The cut could have jeopardized Barrera's scheduled bout against Khan. Despite this injury, he recovered in time for his bout with Khan and the fight went ahead regardless.

==== Comeback ====
After the loss, Barrera took a period of inactivity. The former three time world champion fought on June 26, 2010, against Adailton de Jesus of Brazil. The 10 round bout took place at the Alamodome, San Antonio, Texas, United States. The match was an undercard of the Latin Fury 15 event, which featured Julio César Chávez Jr. vs. John Duddy. Barrera dominated De Jesus for 10 rounds, winning via decision. On February 12, 2011, he fought Jose Arias of the Dominican Republic and scored a TKO in the second round; this was to be Barrera's final fight.

== Outside boxing ==
Barrera's fights were promoted by Oscar De La Hoya under the organization of Golden Boy Promotions. He trained at De La Hoya's training facility in Big Bear, California.

Since January 2009, Barrera has been a commentator for ESPN Deportes' weekly boxing show Golpe a Golpe ("Blow by Blow") which airs live on Friday nights on the network. Barrera's co-host is SportsCenter anchor Jorge Eduardo Sanchez. Golpe a Golpe is the lead-in show to ESPN Deportes' popular Viernes de Combates ("Friday Night Fights") boxing series and is the first ESPN Deportes show dedicated solely to boxing.

He is a natural left handed boxer who fought in a conventional orthodox stance.

== Professional boxing record ==
75 fights	67 wins	7 losses
By knockout	44	1
By decision	21	5
By disqualification	2	1
No contests	1	

No.	Result	Record	Opponent	Type	Round, time	Date	Location	Notes
75	Win	67–7 (1)	Jose Arias	TKO	2 (10), 2:29	Feb 12, 2011	Coliseo Olímpico Universidad, Guadalajara, Mexico	
74	Win	66–7 (1)	Adailton de Jesus	UD	10	Jun 26, 2010	Alamodome, San Antonio, Texas, U.S.	
73	Loss	65–7 (1)	Amir Khan	TD	5 (12), 2:36	Mar 14, 2009	MEN Arena, Manchester, England	For WBA International and vacant WBO Inter-Continental lightweight titles; Unanimous TD: Barrera cut from an accidental head clash
72	Win	65–6 (1)	Freudis Rojas	DQ	3 (10), 2:52	Jan 31, 2009	Auditorio Telmex, Zapopan, Mexico	Rojas disqualified for an intentional headbutt
71	Win	64–6 (1)	Sammy Ventura	TKO	4 (12), 1:01	Nov 7, 2008	Sichuan Gymnasium, Chengdu, China	
70	Loss	63–6 (1)	Manny Pacquiao	UD	12	Oct 6, 2007	Mandalay Bay Events Center, Paradise, Nevada, U.S.	For WBC International super featherweight title
69	Loss	63–5 (1)	Juan Manuel Márquez	UD	12	Mar 17, 2007	Mandalay Bay Events Center, Paradise, Nevada, U.S.	Lost WBC super featherweight title
68	Win	63–4 (1)	Rocky Juarez	UD	12	Sep 16, 2006	MGM Grand Garden Arena, Paradise, Nevada, U.S.	Retained WBC super featherweight title
67	Win	62–4 (1)	Rocky Juarez	SD	12	May 20, 2006	Staples Center, Los Angeles, California, U.S.	Retained WBC super featherweight title
66	Win	61–4 (1)	Robbie Peden	UD	12	Sep 17, 2005	MGM Grand Garden Arena, Paradise, Nevada, U.S.	Retained WBC super featherweight title; Won IBF super featherweight title
65	Win	60–4 (1)	Mzonke Fana	KO	2 (12), 1:48	Apr 9, 2005	Don Haskins Center, El Paso, Texas, U.S.	Retained WBC super featherweight title
64	Win	59–4 (1)	Erik Morales	MD	12	Nov 27, 2004	MGM Grand Garden Arena, Paradise, Nevada, U.S.	Won WBC super featherweight title
63	Win	58–4 (1)	Paulie Ayala	TKO	10 (12), 2:34	Jun 19, 2004	Home Depot Center, Carson, California, U.S.	
62	Loss	57–4 (1)	Manny Pacquiao	TKO	11 (12), 2:56	Nov 15, 2003	Alamodome, San Antonio, Texas, U.S.	Lost The Ring featherweight title
61	Win	57–3 (1)	Kevin Kelley	TKO	4 (12), 1:32	Apr 12, 2003	MGM Grand Garden Arena, Paradise, Nevada, U.S.	Retained The Ring featherweight title
60	Win	56–3 (1)	Johnny Tapia	UD	12	Nov 2, 2002	MGM Grand Garden Arena, Paradise, Nevada, U.S.	Retained The Ring featherweight title
59	Win	55–3 (1)	Erik Morales	UD	12	Jun 22, 2002	MGM Grand Garden Arena, Paradise, Nevada, U.S.	Won WBC and vacant The Ring featherweight title
58	Win	54–3 (1)	Enrique Sánchez	RTD	6 (12), 3:00	Sep 8, 2001	Lawlor Events Center, Reno, Nevada, U.S.	
57	Win	53–3 (1)	Naseem Hamed	UD	12	Apr 7, 2001	MGM Grand Garden Arena, Paradise, Nevada, U.S.	Won vacant IBO featherweight title
56	Win	52–3 (1)	Jesus Salud	RTD	6 (12), 3:00	Dec 1, 2000	The Venetian Las Vegas, Paradise, Nevada, U.S.	Retained WBO super bantamweight title
55	Win	51–3 (1)	Jose Luis Valbuena	UD	12	Sep 9, 2000	New Orleans Arena, New Orleans, Louisiana, U.S.	Retained WBO super bantamweight title
54	Win	50–3 (1)	Luiz Freitas	KO	1 (12), 1:27	Jun 17, 2000	Arena México, Mexico City, Mexico	Retained WBO super bantamweight title
53	Loss	49–3 (1)	Erik Morales	SD	12	Feb 19, 2000	Mandalay Bay Events Center, Paradise, Nevada, U.S.	Lost WBO super bantamweight title; For WBC super bantamweight title
52	NC	49–2 (1)	Cesar Najera	TKO	4 (10), 0:36	Dec 18, 1999	Fantasy Springs Resort Casino, Indio, California, U.S.	Originally TKO win for Barrera, later ruled NC after Najera's fight record could not be verified
51	Win	49–2	Pastor Humberto Maurin	UD	12	Aug 7, 1999	Etess Arena, Atlantic City, New Jersey, U.S.	Retained WBO super bantamweight title
50	Win	48–2	Paul Lloyd	RTD	1 (12), 3:00	Apr 3, 1999	Royal Albert Hall, London, England	Retained WBO super bantamweight title
49	Win	47–2	Richie Wenton	RTD	3 (12), 3:00	Oct 31, 1998	Boardwalk Hall, Atlantic City, New Jersey, U.S.	Won vacant WBO super bantamweight title
48	Win	46–2	Pedro Javier Torres	TKO	4 (10), 1:15	Sep 26, 1998	Caesars Tahoe, Stateline, Nevada, U.S.	
47	Win	45–2	Geronimo Cardoz	KO	1 (10), 2:59	May 16, 1998	Tropicana Las Vegas, Paradise, Nevada, U.S.	
46	Win	44–2	Angel Rosario	TKO	5 (10), 2:40	Feb 21, 1998	Tropicana Las Vegas, Paradise, Nevada, U.S.	
45	Loss	43–2	Junior Jones	UD	12	Apr 18, 1997	Las Vegas Hilton, Winchester, Nevada, U.S.	For WBO super bantamweight title
44	Loss	43–1	Junior Jones	DQ	5 (12), 2:59	Nov 22, 1996	Ice Palace, Tampa, Florida, U.S.	Lost WBO super bantamweight title; Barrera disqualified after his cornermen entered the ring too early
43	Win	43–0	Jesse Magana	TKO	10 (12), 1:56	Sep 14, 1996	Great Western Forum, Inglewood, California, U.S.	Retained WBO super bantamweight title
42	Win	42–0	Orlando Fernandez	TKO	7 (12), 1:03	Jul 14, 1996	Mammoth Events Center, Denver, Colorado, U.S.	Retained WBO super bantamweight title
41	Win	41–0	Jesse Benavides	KO	3 (12), 1:15	May 4, 1996	Arrowhead Pond, Anaheim, California, U.S.	Retained WBO super bantamweight title
40	Win	40–0	Kennedy McKinney	TKO	12 (12), 2:05	Feb 3, 1996	Great Western Forum, Inglewood, California, U.S.	Retained WBO super bantamweight title
39	Win	39–0	Eddie Croft	TKO	7 (12), 1:38	Nov 4, 1995	Caesars Palace, Paradise, Nevada, U.S.	Retained WBO super bantamweight title
38	Win	38–0	Agapito Sánchez	UD	12	Aug 22, 1995	Civic Center, South Padre Island, Texas, U.S.	Retained WBO super bantamweight title
37	Win	37–0	Maui Diaz	TKO	1 (12), 2:50	Jul 15, 1995	Great Western Forum, Inglewood, California, U.S.	Retained WBO super bantamweight title
36	Win	36–0	Frank Toledo	TKO	2 (12), 1:55	Jun 2, 1995	Foxwoods Resort Casino, Ledyard, Connecticut, U.S.	Retained WBO super bantamweight title
35	Win	35–0	Daniel Jiménez	UD	12	Mar 31, 1995	Arrowhead Pond, Anaheim, California, U.S.	Won WBO super bantamweight title
34	Win	34–0	Eddie Cook	TKO	8 (12), 2:31	Dec 3, 1994	Caesars Palace, Paradise, Nevada, U.S.	Retained WBA Penta-Continental super bantamweight title
33	Win	33–0	Jesus Sarabia	TKO	3 (12), 2:33	Oct 22, 1994	Caesars Palace, Paradise, Nevada, U.S.	Won vacant WBA Penta-Continental super bantamweight title
32	Win	32–0	Israel Gonzalez Bringas	TKO	8 (10), 1:34	Aug 15, 1994	Great Western Forum, Inglewood, California, U.S.	
31	Win	31–0	Miguel Espinoza	KO	6 (10), 2:59	Jun 24, 1994	Great Western Forum, Inglewood, California, U.S.	
30	Win	30–0	Carlos Gabriel Salazar	MD	10	Apr 13, 1994	Estadio F.A.B., Buenos Aires, Argentina	
29	Win	29–0	Justo Zuniga	KO	3 (10), 1:54	Mar 1, 1994	Great Western Forum, Inglewood, California, U.S.	
28	Win	28–0	Alejandro Sanabria	KO	1	Nov 27, 1993	Arena Coliseo, Mexico City, Mexico	
27	Win	27–0	Eduardo Ramirez	UD	12	Aug 28, 1993	Great Western Forum, Inglewood, California, U.S.	Won vacant NABF super flyweight title
26	Win	26–0	Elidio Dominguez	KO	1 (10), 0:45	Jul 12, 1993	Great Western Forum, Inglewood, California, U.S.	
25	Win	25–0	Noe Santillana	UD	12	May 22, 1993	El Toreo de Cuatro Caminos, Naucalpan, Mexico	Retained Mexico super flyweight title
24	Win	24–0	Facundo Rodriguez	KO	4 (12), 1:20	Apr 10, 1993	Auditorio Benito Juárez, Veracruz, Mexico	Retained Mexico super flyweight title
23	Win	23–0	Ivan Salazar	UD	10	Mar 1, 1993	Great Western Forum, Inglewood, California, U.S.	
22	Win	22–0	Angel Rosario	TKO	6 (10)	Dec 5, 1992	El Toreo de Cuatro Caminos, Mexico City, Mexico	
21	Win	21–0	Esteban Ayala	KO	4 (12), 1:20	Nov 9, 1992	Great Western Forum, Inglewood, California, U.S.	Retained Mexico super flyweight title
20	Win	20–0	Abner Barajas	PTS	10	Oct 2, 1992	Guadalajara, Mexico	
19	Win	19–0	Miguel Espinoza	KO	6 (12), 0:55	Jul 11, 1992	Mexico City, Mexico	Retained Mexico super flyweight title
18	Win	18–0	Jose Felix Montiel	TKO	2 (12), 0:42	Jun 13, 1992	Arena Coliseo, Mexico City, Mexico	Retained Mexico super flyweight title
17	Win	17–0	Josefino Suarez	UD	12	Apr 1, 1992	Mexico City, Mexico	Won vacant Mexico super flyweight title
16	Win	16–0	Miguel Pina	KO	1 0:57	Dec 7, 1991	Mexico City, Mexico	
15	Win	15–0	Javier Diaz	DQ	7 (10)	Nov 2, 1991	Arena Coliseo, Mexico City, Mexico	Diaz disqualified for feigning injury after a foul
14	Win	14–0	Sergio Aguila	TKO	1 (10), 0:32	Aug 31, 1991	Mexico City, Mexico	
13	Win	13–0	Jaime Rojas	TKO	6	Jun 29, 1991	Mexico City, Mexico	
12	Win	12–0	Juan Facundo Lopez	TKO	1 (10), 2:45	Apr 13, 1991	Arena Coliseo, Mexico City, Mexico	
11	Win	11–0	Abel Hinojosa	TKO	5	Mar 9, 1991	Mexico City, Mexico	
10	Win	10–0	Esteban Rodriguez	TKO	4	Feb 9, 1991	Mexico City, Mexico	
9	Win	9–0	Ivan Salazar	PTS	8	Dec 8, 1990	Arena Coliseo, Mexico City, Mexico	
8	Win	8–0	Jose Yanez	TKO	2 (6)	Oct 13, 1990	Mexico City, Mexico	
7	Win	7–0	Pedro Martínez	TKO	2	Oct 6, 1990	Mexico City, Mexico	
6	Win	6–0	Sebastian Amica	TKO	5	Sep 14, 1990	Acapulco, Mexico	
5	Win	5–0	Federico Lara	KO	3	Aug 4, 1990	Mexico City, Mexico	
4	Win	4–0	Oscar Granados	PTS	4	Jun 9, 1990	Mexico City, Mexico	
3	Win	3–0	Ignacio Jacome	PTS	4	May 18, 1990	Salamanca, Mexico	
2	Win	2–0	Federico Lara	TKO	3	Dec 16, 1989	Palacio de los Deportes, Mexico City, Mexico	
1	Win	1–0	David Felix	TKO	2 (4)	Nov 22, 1989	Palacio de los Deportes, Mexico City, Mexico	

== Exhibition boxing record ==
3 fights	0 wins	0 losses
Non-scored	3	

No.	Result	Record	Opponent	Type	Round, time	Date	Location	Notes
3	—N/a	0–0 (3)	Ricky Hatton	—N/a	8	Nov 12, 2022	Manchester Arena, Manchester, England	Non-scored bout
2	—N/a	0–0 (2)	Daniel Ponce de León	—N/a	6	Nov 20, 2021	Inn of the Mountain Gods, Mescalero, New Mexico, U.S.	Non-scored bout
1	—N/a	0–0 (1)	Jesús Soto Karass	—N/a	6	Jun 11, 2021	Pico Rivera Sports Arena, Pico Rivera, California, U.S.	Non-scored bout

== Titles in boxing ==
=== Major world titles ===
- WBO super bantamweight champion (122 lbs) (3×)
- WBC featherweight champion (126 lbs)
- WBC super featherweight champion (130 lbs)
- IBF super featherweight champion (130 lbs)

=== The Ring magazine titles ===
- The Ring featherweight champion (126 lbs)

=== Minor world titles ===
- IBO featherweight champion (126 lbs)

=== Regional/International titles ===
- Mexico super flyweight champion (115 lbs)
- NABF super flyweight champion (115 lbs)
- WBA Penta-Continental super bantamweight champion (122 lbs)

=== Honorary titles ===
- WBO Super Champion

== Pay-per-view bouts ==
United States
Date	Fight	Billing	Buys	Network	Revenue
April 7, 2001	Hamed vs. Barrera	Playing with Fire	310,000	HBO	—N/a
October 6, 2007	Pacquiao vs. Barrera II	Will to Win	350,000	HBO	$17,532,000
November 20, 2021	Barrera vs. Ponce De Leon	La ultima batalla	—N/a	FITE TV	—N/a

== See also ==
- List of WBC world champions
- List of IBF world champions
- List of WBO world champions
- List of The Ring world champions

Sporting positions
Regional boxing titles
Vacant Title last held by Armando Castro	Mexico super flyweight champion April 1, 1992 – August 1993; Vacated	Vacant Title next held by Joel Luna Zárate
Vacant Title last held by Akeem Anifowoshe	NABF super flyweight champion August 28, 1993 – November 1993; Vacated	Vacant Title next held by Johnny Tapia
Minor world boxing titles
Vacant Title last held by Mbulelo Botile	IBO featherweight champion April 7, 2001 – September 2001; Vacated	Vacant Title next held by Naseem Hamed
Major world boxing titles
Preceded by Daniel Jiménez	WBO junior featherweight champion March 31, 1995 – November 11, 1996	Succeeded by Junior Jones
Vacant Title last held by Kennedy McKinney	WBO junior featherweight champion October 31, 1998 – February 19, 2000	Succeeded by Erik Morales
Vacant Title last held by Erik Morales	WBO junior featherweight champion February 24, 2000 – June 1, 2001; Vacated	Vacant Title next held by Agapito Sánchez
Preceded by Erik Morales	WBC featherweight champion June 22, 2002 – June 22, 2002; Vacated	Vacant Title next held by Erik Morales
Vacant Title last held by Antonio Esparragoza	The Ring featherweight champion June 22, 2002 – November 16, 2003	Succeeded by Manny Pacquiao
Preceded by Erik Morales	WBC super featherweight champion November 27, 2004 – March 17, 2007	Succeeded by Juan Manuel Márquez
Preceded by Robbie Peden	IBF super featherweight champion September 17, 2005 – April 23, 2006; Stripped	Vacant Title next held by Cassius Baloyi
Awards
Previous: Paulie Ayala vs. Johnny Tapia	The Ring Fight of the Year vs. Erik Morales; 2000	Next: Micky Ward vs. Emanuel Augustus
Previous: Oscar De La Hoya vs. Ike Quartey; Round 6	The Ring Round of the Year vs. Erik Morales; Round 5; 2000	Next: Bernard Hopkins vs. Félix Trinidad; Round 10
Previous: Arturo Gatti vs. Micky Ward III	The Ring Fight of the Year vs. Erik Morales III; 2004	Next: Diego Corrales vs. José Luis Castillo
Previous: Acelino Freitas vs. Jorge Rodrigo Barrios; Round 11	The Ring Round of the Year vs. Erik Morales III; Round 3; 2004	Next: Diego Corrales vs. José Luis Castillo; Round 10
Previous: James Toney	The Ring Comeback of the Year; 2004	Next: Ike Quartey
