= Frankie Archuleta =

American boxer

Personal information
- Nickname: feather
- Nationality: American
- Born: Frank Leroy Archuleta; 26 November 1975 (age 50)
- Height: 5 ft 6.5 in (169 cm)
- Weight: Featherweight; Super featherweight

Boxing career
- Reach: 66 in (168 cm)
- Stance: Orthodox

Boxing record
- Total fights: 38
- Wins: 27
- Win by KO: 14
- Losses: 10
- Draws: 1

Frankie Archuleta (born November 26, 1975) is an American retired professional boxer who fought in the featherweight division. He competed from 1997 until 2012.

== Regional titles ==
Archuleta held the WBA-NABA super bantamweight title.

Archuleta lost in an attempt for the WBC Continental Americas super bantamweight title.

Archuleta fought to a draw and thus failed in his attempt to win the North American Boxing Federation featherweight title.

== Notable opponents ==
Archuleta faced, and lost to, John Molina, Jr., Rocky Juarez, and Daud Yordan. Archuleta also split a pair of fights against Johnny Tapia.
