= Fernando Orlando Velárdez =

American boxer

Fernando Velárdez
Personal information
- Nickname: Bobby Boy
- Born: Fernando Orlando Velárdez; January 26, 1981 (age 45) San Bernardino, California
- Height: 5 ft 7.5 in (1.71 m)
- Weight: Lightweight; Super Featherweight; Featherweight; Super Bantamweight

Boxing career
- Reach: 70 in (178 cm)
- Stance: Orthodox

Boxing record
- Total fights: 32
- Wins: 26
- Win by KO: 8
- Losses: 5
- Draws: 1

Fernando Orlando Velárdez (born January 16, 1981, in San Bernardino, California) is an American professional boxer in the Lightweight division. He's the former USBA Super Bantamweight and WBC Youth World Super Featherweight champion.

== Pro career ==
In September 2001, Fernando knocked out the veteran David Donis to win the USBA Super Bantamweight championship.

=== WBC Featherweight Championship ===
On May 3, 2003, Velárdez was knocked out by WBC Featherweight champion Erik Morales at the Mandalay Bay Resort & Casino in Las Vegas, Nevada.

== Professional boxing record ==
32 fights	26 wins	5 losses
By knockout	8	2
By decision	17	3
By disqualification	1	0
Draws	1	
