= Eddie Croft =

American boxer

Personal information
- Nickname: Prime Time/Eddie
- Born: Edward Lee Croft; July 24, 1969 (age 56) San Mateo, California, U.S.
- Height: 5 ft 10 in (178 cm)
- Weight: Lightweight; Super featherweight Featherweight; Super bantamweight

Boxing career
- Reach: 72 in (183 cm)
- Stance: Orthodox

Boxing record
- Total fights: 31
- Wins: 23
- Win by KO: 10
- Losses: 7
- Draws: 1
- No contests: 0

Edward Lee Croft (born July 24, 1969) is an American professional boxer and is the former WBC Continental Americas Super Bantamweight champion.

== Professional career ==
Before fighting for the IBF Featherweight and the WBO Super Bantamweight titles, Edward beat the veteran Jerome Coffee to win the WBC Continental Americas Super Bantamweight title.

=== WBC featherweight title ===
On February 22, 2003 Croft was knocked out by WBC Featherweight champion Érik Morales at the Plaza Mexico in Mexico City.
