= Erik Morales =

Mexican politician and former boxer

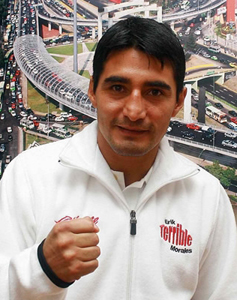
- Morales in 2011

Personal information
- Nickname: El Terrible ("The Terrible")
- Born: Erik Isaac Morales Elvira; September 1, 1976 (age 50) Tijuana, Baja California, Mexico
- Height: 5 ft 8 in (173 cm)
- Weight: Super bantamweight; Featherweight; Super featherweight; Lightweight; Light welterweight; Welterweight

Boxing career
- Reach: 72 in (183 cm)
- Stance: Orthodox

Boxing record
- Total fights: 61
- Wins: 52
- Win by KO: 36
- Losses: 9

Erik Isaac Morales Elvira (born September 1, 1976) is a Mexican politician and former professional boxer who competed from 1993 to 2012. He is the first Mexico-born boxer in history to win world championships in four weight classes, ranging from super bantamweight to light welterweight.

Morales defeated fifteen world champions during the course of his career, and is famous for his trilogies with fellow Mexican legend Marco Antonio Barrera, as well as Manny Pacquiao. ESPN ranked Morales at number 49 on their list of the 50 greatest boxers of all time.

Morales was inducted into the International Boxing Hall of Fame in June 2018.

== Career history ==
=== Early career ===
Erik Morales was born in the Zona Norte section of Tijuana. Under the tutelage of his father, José Morales, a fighter himself, Erik started boxing at the age of five and amassed a very impressive amateur career that totaled 114 fights (108–6), winning 11 major titles in Mexico in the process. Morales made his professional debut at the age of 16 by knocking out Jose Orejel in two rounds. Between 1993 and 1997, he quickly climbed the ranks in the super bantamweight division, winning 26 fights, 20 by knockout, including wins against former champions Kenny Mitchell and Hector Acero Sánchez, before challenging for his first world title. It was during this time that he signed with promoter Bob Arum.

=== Super bantamweight ===
==== Morales vs. Zaragoza ====
On September 6, 1997, in El Paso, Texas, at the age of 21, he won his first world title by stopping WBC Super Bantamweight Champion and now member of the International Boxing Hall of Fame, Daniel Zaragoza, via knockout in eleven rounds.

In his first defense, Morales defeated John Lowey (24–2) by knockout in the seventh round. In his next fight, he defeated Remigio Molina (31–1) by knockout in the 6th round. On May 16, 1998, he defeated former champion Jose Luis Bueno via knockout in the second round.

==== Morales vs. Jones ====
In September 1998, in another landmark fight, Morales knocked out former two-weight world champion Junior Jones of the United States. Jones went into the battle with a daunting record against Mexican fighters of 35 victories and no losses, most notably including two victories over the previous champion, Marco Antonio Barrera, in 1996 and 1997. Also noteworthy was that Jones was entering México for the first time to fight, and the fight was held at Tijuana. The fight went on to three contested rounds, before Morales knocked out Jones with two consecutive overhead right crosses in the fourth round.

In October 1999, Morales fought and defeated former WBC Bantamweight Champion Wayne McCullough of Northern Ireland, saying that McCullough gave him one of the three toughest fights of his career.

==== Morales vs. Barrera I ====
In February 2000, Morales defeated Marco Antonio Barrera to win the WBO Super Bantamweight title, in a fight that is now considered one of boxing's classics. Morales won the fight by a controversial split decision. It was an intense battle in which both fighters were cut and battered. Many people thought Barrera had won the fight on a knockdown that he scored in the twelfth and final round. After the fight, Morales said, "He was a brave fighter, and we both gave it all we had. We were both hurt during the fight. He was the biggest puncher I ever faced in the ring." The Ring named it the Fight of the Year.

=== Featherweight ===
After nine successful title defenses, Morales chose to vacate his WBC Super Bantamweight title to move up to featherweight division. In his second fight at this weight, he fought 33-year-old former world champion Kevin Kelley, in September 2000. Kelley was knocked down in the fifth and seventh rounds, he was finally trapped in the latter round by a flurry of five consecutive uppercuts from Morales. Supported only by the ropes, a sixth uppercut landed, and the fight was stopped. Morales became the Interim WBC Featherweight Champion.

==== Morales vs. Espadas Jr. ====
Morales fought again in 2000, knocking out Rodney Jones in the first round. In February 2001, he fought Guty Espadas Jr., the WBC Featherweight title holder with a thirteen fight winning streak, and whose father, Guty Espadas, Sr., was also a world champion boxer. Morales won a close twelve-round decision to claim his third world title in his second weight division. Although Morales was highly rated in the featherweight division, Naseem Hamed was seen as the Lineal Champion of the division.

==== Morales vs. Chi ====
In July 2001, Morales defeated future champion In Jin Chi of South Korea and retained his title. Chi gave a strong effort, but Morales was the sharper, harder puncher and outworked him for much of the fight. Morales was cut and swollen over the left eye in the sixth round by an accidental clash of heads and Chi was penalized one point in the tenth round.

==== Morales vs. Barrera II ====
Morales then tasted defeat for the first time in his 42nd professional fight when he lost (this time) a controversial unanimous decision and his WBC title against Lineal Champion, Marco Antonio Barrera in June 2002, in a re-match of their February 2000 fight. Morales constantly pressed forward and dominated much of the first half of the fight (clearly winning at least 4 of the first 6 rounds). He was cut on the bridge of the nose in the 2nd round, and cut and swollen over his right eye in the 8th. However, he punched Barrera to the canvas during the middle rounds but this was called a slip. Barrera fought cautiously in the early rounds, but rallied as the fight progressed, although Morales seemed to narrowly win rounds 10 and 11, which when including his dominance in the first half of the fight, seemed to seal him the close victory on the score-cards. HBO's unofficial ring-side scorer: Harold Lederman, scored the fight 115–113 (7 rounds to 5) for Morales.

==== Second Featherweight title reign ====
Morales bounced back with a dominating twelve-round decision victory over former world champion, Paulie Ayala in November 2002 to regain the vacant WBC Featherweight title. The early rounds were close, but Morales started to dominate in the middle rounds, consistently landing the harder punches and Ayala's left eye began to swell. He slowed his pace in the late rounds and Ayala rallied, but Morales rocked him with a series of punches in the 12th round.

Morales defeated Eddie Croft in March 2003. He scored three knockdowns and stopped Croft in the 3rd round. All the fighters on the card donated their purses to "Vamos Mexico," a children's charity headed by Marta Sahagun, wife of Mexican president Vicente Fox.

Morales defeated Fernando Velárdez later that year. He knocked down Velárdez in the 1st, 4th and 5th rounds when the fight was stopped without a count.

=== Super featherweight ===
==== Morales vs. Espadas Jr. II ====
In October 2003, Morales defeated Guty Espadas Jr. in a rematch of their first close fight, which was also a WBC Super Featherweight title eliminator. This time Morales knocked him out in three rounds. Morales vacated his WBC Featherweight title immediately after the bout, remaining in the super featherweight division.

==== Morales vs. Chávez ====
On February 28, 2004, Morales captured the WBC Super Featherweight title by unanimous decision over Jesús Chávez. Morales twice knocked down Chávez, which Floyd Mayweather Jr. had been unable to do. Morales was rocked midway through the 1st round, but he came back to score two knockdowns in the 2nd round and managed to cut Chavez over the left eye. Chavez injured his right shoulder early in the fight and threw very few right hands, but still fought aggressively for the rest of the fight with his jab and left hooks which cut Morales over the eye in the 4th round. With the victory he became the second Mexican boxer to win a title at three separate weight divisions, the first being the acclaimed Julio César Chávez.

On July 31, 2004, Morales unified his WBC Super Featherweight title with the IBF version by way of a twelve-round unanimous decision over Carlos Hernández. Hernández constantly pressed forward, but Morales boxed effectively consistently landing the harder, more accurate punches that rocked Hernández several times.

==== Morales vs. Barrera III ====
On November 27, 2004, Morales fought Barrera for the third time in a bout for the WBC Super Featherweight title. Their highly anticipated third battle drew a capacity crowd of over 11,000. Barrera started fast and rocked Morales late in the first round and bloodied his nose in the second. Morales came back strongly in the second half of the fight and won four of the last six rounds on two judges' scorecards. However, the judges scored the bout 114–114, 114–115, 113–115 in favor of Barrera, in what was justifiably a very, very close, but non-controversial and justifiable win for Barrera. Their third meeting was once again named The Ring Fight of the Year.

==== Morales vs. Pacquiao I ====
On March 19, 2005, as a betting underdog, Morales defeated then three-division world champion Filipino boxer Manny Pacquiao, by a unanimous decision. During the 12th round, Morales, comfortably ahead on the scorecards, decided to brawl with the Filipino slugger, even turning southpaw during the process. In a post fight interview, HBO broadcaster Larry Merchant, asked Morales, "Why?" Morales replied by asking a question of his own, "Did you enjoy it? That's why."

Later that night, at the post-fight press conference, Erik further explained his reasoning for brawling with the Filipino slugger; "It was a great pleasure to fight this way. I think I was controlling the fight with my distance. Sometimes I need to put a little flavor into the ring. My promoter always says that I make the fights very difficult, but they're not difficult, they're fun for the public. I decided to stop myself in front of him in the twelfth round because I wanted to give the public what they deserve. It was a great round. I'm very happy about it."

=== Lightweight ===
==== Morales vs. Raheem ====
On September 10, 2005, Erik Morales moved up to the lightweight division and was defeated by unanimous decision by Zahir Raheem. Raheem frustrated Morales with constant lateral movement. Raheem rocked Morales in the 5th round and built a lead on the scorecards, but Morales rallied in the 11th round and staggered him with a right hand as Raheem's glove touched the canvas, but it was not scored a knockdown by referee Jon Schorle. The final scores were 118–110, 116–112 and 115–112 in favor of Raheem.

=== Return to Super featherweight ===
==== Morales vs. Pacquiao II & III ====
On January 22, 2006, Morales fought Pacquiao in a rematch from their bout ten months before and was defeated in ten rounds. Pacquiao knocked down Morales twice in the final seconds of round ten and the fight was stopped.

He fought Pacquiao for the third time in a non-championship title bout, on November 18, 2006. Morales was defeated by a knockout in three rounds. After the fight, Morales said "Maybe it's time I should no longer be doing this." He sat speechless in his corner for five minutes afterward. "I did everything in camp necessary to win this fight. I didn't win it. It wasn't my night...it just wasn't meant to be." Asked by Larry Merchant whether he would retire from boxing, Morales offered, "Maybe this is the way to end it. It's a beautiful night, and there's a lot of good people (here in the audience)...it was always a pleasure to give the public great fights."

=== Return to Lightweight ===
Morales moved up to the lightweight division in search of a possible fourth WBC title. During a holiday visit to the Philippines in January 2007, Morales told a local newspaper that he was fighting again but declined to name his next opponent. He stated that he had unfinished business in the boxing ring and was determined to regain recognition as a world champion. He also expressed his desire to become the first Mexican fighter to win four WBC titles in different divisions and surpass Julio César Chávez's record by campaigning at the lightweight class of 135 lb (61 kg).

==== Morales vs. Díaz ====
On August 4, 2007, Morales fought David Díaz for the WBC Lightweight title and lost a close unanimous decision at the Allstate Arena. Judges Herminio, Cuevas Collazo and Robert Hecko both scored Round 1, 10–9 Morales, even though Morales knocked down Díaz in that round. Collazo then went on to score Round 2, 10–8 for Diaz, when not only did a knockdown not occur, but the two other judges saw it as a Morales round. The final scores read 114–113 (Collazo), 115–113 (Hecko) and 115–112 (Uratani), all in favor of Díaz. It was Morales' fifth loss in his last six bouts. During the post-fight press conference, Morales announced his retirement from boxing.

=== Comeback ===
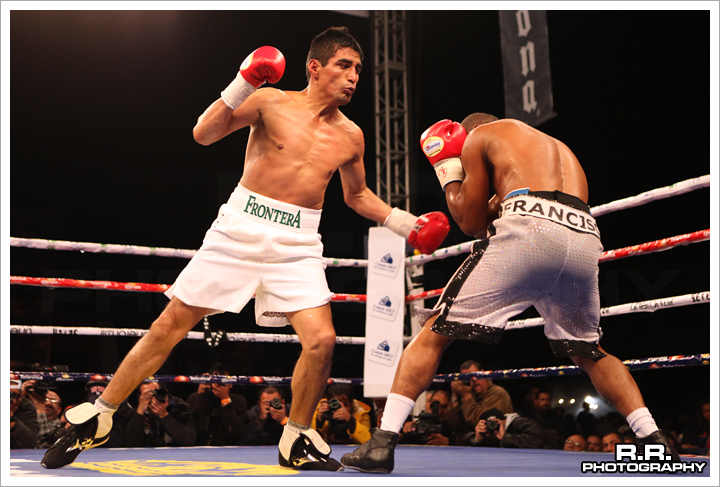
Morales vs. Lorenzo, 2010

In various interviews conducted in 2009, Morales began to state that he would fight again in late 2009 to early 2010, after he gave his body enough time to rest. Morales also stated that he would continue to fight as a lightweight.

His first comeback fight was then set for México in early 2010, against ranked Nicaraguan welterweight contender José Alfaro.

=== Light welterweight ===
==== Morales vs. Maidana ====
On April 9, 2011, the MGM Grand Garden Arena hosted HBO Pay Per View's "Action Heroes." The main event featured Erik Morales fighting against Marcos Rene Maidana.

Many boxing pundits felt that an aging Morales, fighting a couple of divisions above his best weight, stood little chance against the hard hitting Maidana. However, Morales turned back the clock and gave his best performance since beating Pacquiao. The opening bell saw Maidana jump on the older Morales. Morales' eye was badly swollen in the first round by a series of hard shots, especially a devastating uppercut, and it looked like the rout was on. However, Morales held his own through the next few rounds before rallying in the 8th–10th rounds. Although Maidana was using combos to hurt "El Terrible," Morales started turning the tide mid-fight, throwing very heavy counter-punches and almost knocking Maidana down. However, just when the fight seemed within Morales' grasp, Maidana took over by throwing combos, giving him the final rounds of the fight. Morales put up a valiant effort, performed better than anyone thought possible, won the crowd over and gave the boxing public another "Fight of the Year" candidate. However, it just wasn't enough. In the end, Maidana's youth and Morales' age and mileage were just too much to overcome, and Maidana eked out a majority decision victory with scores of 114–114 and 116–112 twice.

==== Morales vs. Cano ====
Morales was due to fight WBO Inter-Continental Light Welterweight Champion Lucas Matthysse as an undercard to the Floyd Mayweather Jr. vs. Victor Ortiz bout. Matthysse pulled out of the bout, citing a viral infection.

On September 17, 2011, Morales won the WBC Light Welterweight Championship with a win over un-rated Pablo César Cano. The title had been vacant after previous champion Timothy Bradley's status had contentiously been changed to Champ in Recess due to inactivity. Many including experts and commentators saw the title won by Morales as a paper championship. Following Morales' win, he would be rated No.7 on Ring Magazine's light welterweight ratings, with all other title holders and highly rated contenders ranked above him. Morales is the inaugural Mexico-born boxer to win world titles in four different weight classes.

==== Morales vs. Garcia I & II ====
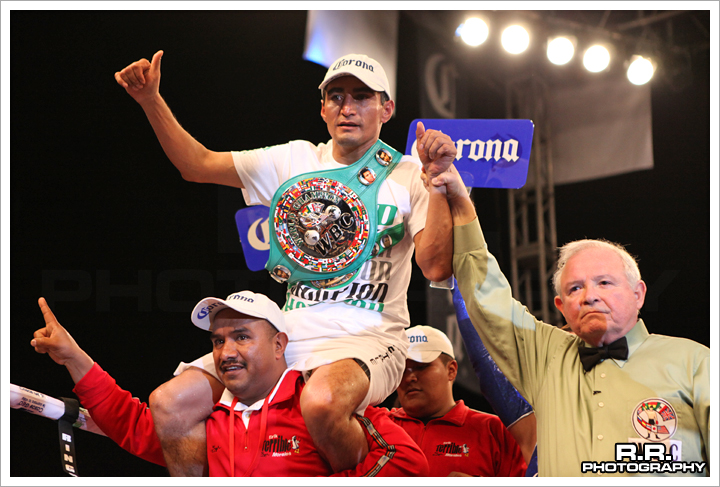
Morales celebrating with the WBC Silver title, 2010

On March 24, 2012, Morales faced 23-year-old Danny García (22–0 14 KO's) in another chapter of the storied "Puerto Rico vs. Mexico" boxing rivalry. García entered the contest following victories over former titleholders Nate Campbell and Kendall Holt. However, Morales attended the weigh-in over two pounds above the light welterweight limit. He remained champion until the fight, but only García could win the belt by defeating him, as a Morales win would vacate it. Morales lost by unanimous decision.

Morales fought on October 20, 2012, on a rematch with now The Ring, WBC & WBA (Super) Light Welterweight Champion Danny Garcia. He was knocked out by Danny Garcia in the 4th round, the fight was aired on Showtime Boxing. Here is how FOX Sports described how Danny Garcia knocked out Erik Morales:

"Morales is dancing in the opening seconds but is that because he's got a second wind or because he still doesn't know where he is. He did head to the wrong corner at the end of the last round.

This is a bad omen folks. Garcia is tapping Morales' guard with his left hand, literally telling Morales where the next shot is going to come. After four taps, Morales decides it's time to get aggressive. Bad move. Garcia blasts Morales with a left hook that launches Morales through the ropes. You can see it in Morales' eyes, he's not getting back up. KO for Garcia."

== Doping allegations ==
Prior to Morales-Garcia rematch on October 20, 2012, United States Anti-Doping Agency (USADA) conducted two random drug tests (Oct 3 and 10, 2012). Morales was tested positive for use of the banned substance Clenbuterol, a weight-loss drug, it reduces fat deposits and is believed to increase muscle mass. Although the New York State Athletic Commission was notified 24 hours in advance of the Garcia-Morales bout regarding Morales’ positive drug test results, the legal process was still ongoing. The NYSAC allowed the fight to proceed.

== Retirement ==
In March 2013, Morales revealed plans to fight at least once more. “The idea is to make a nice party for the farewell of my career,” he said. “I’ve had a 20-year career. “(The party is) not only for me, but for the people who stood by me – my father, my mother, my brothers, the fans, the press, especially the coaches, trainers, doctors, sparring partners and all of those who helped prepare me and demanded me to be better every day. But mostly, my children and my wife, who often had to endure my absence for long periods of time. This is not just for me, but for everyone involved in my career,” Morales said. In June 2014, Morales officially announced his retirement forgoing a farewell fight.

=== Rape allegations ===
On January 9, 2024, it was announced that a 54-year-old woman alleged that Morales sexually abused and harassed her in June 2013 at Morales' gym, "Box Platino" in Tijuana. In 2025, he was removed from his position as Secretary of Welfare of the Tijuana City Council.

== Outside the ring ==
Morales was trained and managed by his father José Morales and was promoted by Bob Arum and Top Rank. His brothers are Iván Morales and former WBO Super Flyweight Champion Diego Morales. Erik has four children.

Erik Morales currently spends his time managing a $3.5 million budget running the parks and recreation department in Tijuana. Morales donates his salary back to the department to further help fund it. Morales was quoted as saying, "This is just a way for me to be able to thank the people who have been so good to me all my life."

On May 30, 2015, Morales agreed to train former light welterweight champion Jessie Vargas for his then-upcoming fight with Timothy Bradley. Morales replaced world champion Roy Jones Jr. as the head trainer Vargas's corner.

He has a total of 7 children. 5 sons: Fernando, Angel, Luis, Erik II and Nicolas. And 2 daughters: Dea and Florencia.

It was announced on December 1, 2021, that one of Morales' sons, 23-year-old Fernando, had died. Fernando's cause of death was heart attack.

== Political career ==
In the 2018 general election, Morales was elected to the Chamber of Deputies to represent Baja California's 7th district for the National Regeneration Movement (Morena) during the 64th session of Congress. He served on the legislative body's committee on sports.

== Professional boxing record ==
61 fights	52 wins	9 losses
By knockout	36	3
By decision	16	6

No.	Result	Record	Opponent	Type	Round, time	Date	Location	Notes
61	Loss	52–9	Danny García	KO	4 (12), 1:23	Oct 20, 2012	Barclays Center, New York City, New York, U.S.	For WBA (Super), WBC, and The Ring light welterweight titles
60	Loss	52–8	Danny García	UD	12	Mar 24, 2012	Reliant Arena, Houston, Texas, U.S.	WBC light welterweight title at stake; only for Garcia as Morales missed weight
59	Win	52–7	Pablo César Cano	RTD	10 (12), 3:00	Sep 17, 2011	MGM Grand Garden Arena, Paradise, Nevada, U.S.	Won vacant WBC light welterweight title
58	Loss	51–7	Marcos Maidana	MD	12	Apr 9, 2011	MGM Grand Garden Arena, Paradise, Nevada, U.S.	For WBA interim light welterweight title
57	Win	51–6	Francisco Lorenzo	UD	12	Dec 18, 2010	Agua Caliente Racetrack, Tijuana, Mexico	Retained WBC Silver light welterweight title
56	Win	50–6	Willie Limond	KO	6 (12), 2:46	Sep 11, 2010	Plaza Mexico, Mexico City, Mexico	Won vacant WBC Silver light welterweight title
55	Win	49–6	José Alfaro	UD	12	Mar 27, 2010	Arena Monterrey, Monterrey, Mexico	Won WBC International welterweight title
54	Loss	48–6	David Díaz	UD	12	Aug 4, 2007	Allstate Arena, Rosemont, Illinois, U.S.	For WBC lightweight title
53	Loss	48–5	Manny Pacquiao	KO	3 (12), 2:57	Nov 18, 2006	Thomas & Mack Center, Paradise, Nevada, U.S.	For WBC International super featherweight title
52	Loss	48–4	Manny Pacquiao	TKO	10 (12), 2:33	Jan 21, 2006	Thomas & Mack Center, Paradise, Nevada, U.S.	For WBC International super featherweight title
51	Loss	48–3	Zahir Raheem	UD	12	Sep 10, 2005	Staples Center, Los Angeles, California, U.S.	For vacant WBC International lightweight title
50	Win	48–2	Manny Pacquiao	UD	12	Mar 19, 2005	MGM Grand Garden Arena, Paradise, Nevada, U.S.	Won vacant IBA and WBC International super featherweight titles
49	Loss	47–2	Marco Antonio Barrera	MD	12	Nov 27, 2004	MGM Grand Garden Arena, Paradise, Nevada, U.S.	Lost WBC super featherweight title
48	Win	47–1	Carlos Hernández	UD	12	Jul 31, 2004	MGM Grand Garden Arena, Paradise, Nevada, U.S.	Retained WBC super featherweight title; Won IBF super featherweight title
47	Win	46–1	Jesús Chávez	UD	12	Feb 28, 2004	MGM Grand Garden Arena, Paradise, Nevada, U.S.	Won WBC super featherweight title
46	Win	45–1	Guty Espadas Jr.	KO	3 (12), 2:58	Oct 4, 2003	Staples Center, Los Angeles, California, U.S.	
45	Win	44–1	Fernando Velárdez	TKO	5 (12), 1:02	May 3, 2003	Mandalay Bay Events Center, Paradise, Nevada, U.S.	Retained WBC featherweight title
44	Win	43–1	Eddie Croft	TKO	3 (12), 2:16	Feb 22, 2003	Plaza de Toros, Mexico City, Mexico	Retained WBC featherweight title
43	Win	42–1	Paulie Ayala	UD	12	Nov 16, 2002	Mandalay Bay Events Center, Paradise, Nevada, U.S.	Won vacant WBC featherweight title
42	Loss	41–1	Marco Antonio Barrera	UD	12	Jun 22, 2002	MGM Grand Garden Arena, Paradise, Nevada, U.S.	Lost WBC featherweight title; For vacant The Ring featherweight title
41	Win	41–0	In-Jin Chi	UD	12	Jul 28, 2001	Staples Center, Los Angeles, California, U.S.	Retained WBC featherweight title
40	Win	40–0	Guty Espadas Jr.	UD	12	Feb 17, 2001	MGM Grand Garden Arena, Paradise, Nevada, U.S.	Won WBC featherweight title
39	Win	39–0	Rodney Jones	KO	1 (10), 1:02	Dec 9, 2000	Auditorio Municipal, Tijuana, Mexico	
38	Win	38–0	Kevin Kelley	TKO	7 (12), 2:30	Sep 2, 2000	Don Haskins Center, El Paso, Texas, U.S.	Won WBC interim featherweight title
37	Win	37–0	Mike Juárez	KO	3 (10), 1:12	Jun 17, 2000	Staples Center, Los Angeles, California, U.S.	
36	Win	36–0	Marco Antonio Barrera	SD	12	Feb 19, 2000	Mandalay Bay Events Center, Paradise, Nevada, U.S.	Retained WBC super bantamweight title; Won WBO super bantamweight title
35	Win	35–0	Wayne McCullough	UD	12	Oct 22, 1999	Joe Louis Arena, Detroit, Michigan, U.S.	Retained WBC super bantamweight title
34	Win	34–0	Reynante Jamili	TKO	6 (12), 0:11	Jul 31, 1999	Bullring by the Sea, Tijuana, Mexico	Retained WBC super bantamweight title
33	Win	33–0	Juan Carlos Ramírez	RTD	9 (12), 3:00	May 8, 1999	Las Vegas Hilton, Winchester, Nevada, U.S.	Retained WBC super bantamweight title
32	Win	32–0	Ángel Chacón	KO	2 (12), 1:50	Feb 13, 1999	Thomas & Mack Center, Paradise, Nevada, U.S.	Retained WBC super bantamweight title
31	Win	31–0	Junior Jones	KO	4 (12), 2:55	Sep 12, 1998	Bullring by the Sea, Tijuana, Mexico	Retained WBC super bantamweight title
30	Win	30–0	José Luis Bueno	KO	2 (12), 1:19	May 16, 1998	Fantasy Springs Resort Casino, Indio, California, U.S.	Retained WBC super bantamweight title
29	Win	29–0	Remigio Molina	TKO	6 (12), 0:14	Apr 3, 1998	Auditorio Municipal, Tijuana, Mexico	Retained WBC super bantamweight title
28	Win	28–0	John Lowey	RTD	7 (12), 3:00	Dec 12, 1997	Auditorio Municipal, Tijuana, Mexico	Retained WBC super bantamweight title
27	Win	27–0	Daniel Zaragoza	KO	11 (12), 2:59	Sep 6, 1997	County Coliseum, El Paso, Texas, U.S.	Won WBC super bantamweight title
26	Win	26–0	Concepcion Velásquez	TKO	8 (10), 1:11	Apr 4, 1997	The Orleans, Paradise, Nevada, U.S.	
25	Win	25–0	Robbie Lovato	PTS	10	Nov 29, 1996	Tijuana, Mexico	
24	Win	24–0	Pedro Javier Torres	KO	2 (12), 1:50	Oct 12, 1996	Arrowhead Pond, Anaheim, California, U.S.	Retained NABF super bantamweight title
23	Win	23–0	Hector Acero Sánchez	UD	12	Jun 7, 1996	Caesars Palace, Paradise, Nevada, U.S.	Retained NABF super bantamweight title
22	Win	22–0	Lee Cargle	TKO	2 (10), 0:11	Apr 22, 1996	Tijuana, Mexico	Retained NABF super bantamweight title
21	Win	21–0	Rudy Bradley	TKO	11 (12), 0:02	Feb 25, 1996	Arizona Charlie's Decatur, Las Vegas, Nevada, U.S.	Retained NABF super bantamweight title
20	Win	20–0	Kenny Mitchell	TKO	2 (12), 2:30	Dec 18, 1995	Tijuana, Mexico	Won vacant NABF super bantamweight title
19	Win	19–0	Enrique Angeles	UD	12	Nov 10, 1995	Tijuana, Mexico	Retained Mexico super bantamweight title
18	Win	18–0	Alberto Martínez	TKO	4 (12), 0:42	Sep 9, 1995	Caesars Palace, Paradise, Nevada, U.S.	Retained NABF and Mexico super bantamweight titles
17	Win	17–0	Juan Luis Torres	UD	12	Jul 14, 1995	Arizona Charlie's Decatur, Las Vegas, Nevada, U.S.	Won vacant NABF super bantamweight title
16	Win	16–0	Armando Castro	TKO	10 (12), 1:04	Jun 2, 1995	Tijuana, Mexico	Retained WBC Mundo Hispano super bantamweight title
15	Win	15–0	Enrique Jupiter	TKO	6 (12), 0:28	Apr 21, 1995	Tijuana, Mexico	Won Mexico super bantamweight title
14	Win	14–0	Ricky Hernández	KO	1 (12), 0:14	Feb 3, 1995	Tijuana, Mexico	Retained WBC Mundo Hispano super bantamweight title
13	Win	13–0	José Valdez	TKO	3 (12), 2:14	Dec 19, 1994	Tijuana, Mexico	Won WBC Mundo Hispano super bantamweight title
12	Win	12–0	Ramón Magana	TKO	2 (10), 1:19	Nov 28, 1994	Tijuana, Mexico	
11	Win	11–0	Idelfonso Bernal	KO	3 (10), 0:21	Oct 17, 1994	Tijuana, Mexico	
10	Win	10–0	Julio César Cardona	KO	2 (10), 1:01	Aug 22, 1994	Tijuana, Mexico	
9	Win	9–0	Isidro Nolasco	PTS	8	Mar 26, 1994	Mexico City, Mexico	
8	Win	8–0	Paul Olvera	KO	3 (6), 2:55	Jan 21, 1994	Tijuana, Mexico	
7	Win	7–0	Alfonso Mota	KO	2 (6), 1:19	Dec 6, 1993	Tijuana, Mexico	
6	Win	6–0	Jaime Abrica	KO	2 (6), 0:03	Oct 22, 1993	Tijuana, Mexico	
5	Win	5–0	José Álvarez	UD	6	Jul 26, 1993	Tijuana, Mexico	
4	Win	4–0	Marco Tovar	TKO	1 (6), 0:59	Jul 8, 1993	Bullring by the Sea, Tijuana, Mexico	
3	Win	3–0	Óscar Maldonado	KO	3 (4), 0:32	May 25, 1993	Tijuana, Mexico	
2	Win	2–0	Jaime Rodríguez	KO	2 (4), 1:11	May 7, 1993	Tijuana, Mexico	
1	Win	1–0	José Orejel	KO	2 (4), 0:19	Mar 29, 1993	Tijuana, Mexico	

== Exhibition boxing record ==
3 fights	0 wins	0 losses
Non-scored	3	

No.	Result	Record	Opponent	Type	Round, time	Date	Location	Notes
3	—N/a	0–0 (3)	Jorge Arce	—N/a	4	Jun 3, 2022	Marcelino Gonzalez Gymnasium, Zacatecas, Mexico	Non-scored bout
2	—N/a	0–0 (2)	Orlando Salido	—N/a	4	Mar 26, 2022	Mesquite Championship Rodeo, Mesquite, Texas, U.S.	Non-scored bout
1	—N/a	0–0 (1)	Mikey Garcia	—N/a	4	Jun 23, 2019	E Club Center, San Bernardino, California, U.S.	Non-scored bout

== Titles in boxing ==
=== Major world titles ===
- WBC super bantamweight champion (122 lbs)
- WBO super bantamweight champion (122 lbs)
- WBC featherweight champion (126 lbs) (2×)
- WBC super featherweight champion (130 lbs)
- IBF super featherweight champion (130 lbs)
- WBC light welterweight champion (140 lbs)

=== Interim/Silver world titles (Note: In 2010, the WBC created the "Silver Championship", intended as a replacement for interim titles.) ===
- WBC interim featherweight champion (126 lbs)
- WBC Silver light welterweight champion (140 lbs)

=== Minor world titles ===
- IBA super featherweight champion (130 lbs)

=== Regional/International titles ===
- WBC Mundo Hispano super bantamweight champion (122 lbs)
- Mexico super bantamweight champion (122 lbs)
- NABF super bantamweight champion (122 lbs) (2×)
- WBC International super featherweight champion (130 lbs)
- WBC International welterweight champion (147 lbs)

=== Honorary titles ===
- WBC Emeritus Champion

== Pay-per-view bouts ==
United States
No.	Date	Fight	Billing	Buys	Network	Revenue
1	March 19, 2005	Morales vs. Pacquiao	Coming With Everything	350,000	HBO	$15,700,000
2	January 21, 2006	Morales vs. Pacquiao II	The Battle	360,000	HBO	$16,200,000
3	November 18, 2006	Pacquiao vs. Morales III	The Grand Finale	350,000	HBO	$17,500,000
4	April 9, 2011	Morales vs. Maidana	Action Heroes	N/A	HBO	N/A

== See also ==
- Notable boxing families
- List of world super-bantamweight boxing champions
- List of world featherweight boxing champions
- List of world super-featherweight boxing champions
- List of world light-welterweight boxing champions
- List of boxing quadruple champions
- List of Mexican boxing world champions

== Notes and references ==
=== References ===
Sporting positions
Regional boxing titles
Preceded by Jose Valdez	WBC Mundo Hispano super bantamweight champion December 19, 1994 – July 1995; Vacated	Vacant Title next held by Jorge Munoz Jr.
Preceded by Enrique Jupiter	Mexico super bantamweight champion April 21, 1995 – December 1995; Vacated	Vacant Title next held by Néstor Garza
Vacant Title last held by Jesus Salud	NABF super bantamweight champion July 14, 1995 – October 1995; Vacated	Vacant Title next held by Darryl Pinckney
Vacant Title last held by Darryl Pinckney	NABF super bantamweight champion December 18, 1995 – November 1996; Vacated	Vacant Title next held by Enrique Sánchez
Vacant Title last held by Mzonke Fana	WBC International super featherweight champion March 19, 2005 – September 2005; Vacated	Vacant Title next held by Manny Pacquiao
Vacant Title last held by Selçuk Aydın	WBC International welterweight champion March 27, 2010 – June 2010; Vacated	Vacant Title next held by Phil Lo Greco
New title	WBC Silver super lightweight champion September 11, 2010 – April 2011; Vacated	Vacant Title next held by Roberto Ortiz
Minor world boxing titles
Vacant Title last held by Diego Corrales	IBA super featherweight champion March 19, 2005 – August 2005; Vacated	Vacant Title next held by Antonio Davis
Major world boxing titles
Preceded by Daniel Zaragoza	WBC super bantamweight champion September 6, 1997 – July 20, 2000; Vacated	Vacant Title next held by Willie Jorrín
Preceded by Marco Antonio Barrera	WBO super bantamweight champion February 19, 2000 – February 24, 2000; Stripped	Succeeded by Marco Antonio Barrera; Reinstated
New title	WBC featherweight champion Interim title September 2, 2000 – February 17, 2001; Won full title	Vacant Title next held by Humberto Soto
Preceded by Guty Espadas Jr.	WBC featherweight champion February 17, 2001 – June 22, 2002	Succeeded by Marco Antonio Barrera
Vacant Title last held by Marco Antonio Barrera	WBC featherweight champion November 16, 2002 – October 5, 2003; Vacated	Vacant Title next held by Chi In-jin
Preceded by Jesús Chávez	WBC super featherweight champion February 28, 2004 – November 27, 2004	Succeeded by Marco Antonio Barrera
Preceded by Carlos Hernández	IBF super featherweight champion July 31, 2004 – September 21, 2004; Stripped	Vacant Title next held by Robbie Peden
Vacant Title last held by Timothy Bradley	WBC super lightweight champion September 17, 2011 – March 23, 2012; Stripped	Vacant Title next held by Danny Garcia
