= Johnny Tapia =

American boxer (1967–2012)

Personal information
- Nicknames: Mi vida loca ("My crazy life"); Baby-faced Assassin
- Born: John Lee Anthony Tapia; February 13, 1967 Albuquerque, New Mexico, U.S.
- Died: May 27, 2012 (aged 45) Albuquerque, New Mexico, U.S.
- Height: 5 ft 6 in (168 cm)
- Weight: Super flyweight; Bantamweight; Featherweight; Lightweight

Boxing career
- Reach: 62 1/2 in (159 cm)
- Stance: Orthodox

Boxing record
- Total fights: 66
- Wins: 59
- Win by KO: 30
- Losses: 5
- Draws: 2

John Lee Anthony Tapia (February 13, 1967 – May 27, 2012) was an American professional boxer who competed from 1988 to 2011. He was a three-division world champion, having held titles at super flyweight, bantamweight, and featherweight. His 1999 loss by decision to Paulie Ayala was named the Fight of the Year by The Ring magazine.

Tapia was posthumously inducted into the International Boxing Hall of Fame in 2017.

== Early life ==
Tapia was born in Albuquerque, New Mexico to Mexican American parents. His father had reportedly been murdered while his mother was pregnant with him. When he was eight years old, his mother, Virginia, was kidnapped, raped, repeatedly stabbed, and left dead by her assailant. Raised thereafter by his grandmother, Tapia turned to boxing at the age of nine.

== Amateur career ==
Tapia had an outstanding amateur career, winning the 1983 New Mexico State Golden Gloves, the 1983 and 1985 National Golden Gloves tournaments at light flyweight and flyweight, respectively.

== Professional career ==
=== Super flyweight ===
==== Early years ====
Tapia's professional boxing career began on March 25, 1988, when he fought Effren Chavez in Irvine, California. After four rounds of boxing the fight was called a draw. He won eight fights that year, five by knockout, of which four were in the first round. In 1989, he won seven more fights, including a first-round knockout of Abner Barajas and an eight-round decision against John Michael Johnson.

In 1990, he won seven bouts, including an eight-round decision over Jesus Chong, an eleventh-round technical knockout of Roland Gomez in Reno that gave him the USBA super flyweight title, and a twelve-round decision over Luigi Camputaro, to retain that title. Tapia was, by the end of the year, a known boxer, his name often appearing in magazine articles. However, his career came to a halt for the next three and a half years after being suspended from boxing for testing positive for cocaine.

When he finally returned to the ring on March 27, 1994, he beat Jaime Olvera by a knockout in four rounds in Tulsa, Oklahoma. He won three more fights by knockout, and then he faced Oscar Aguilar on the Michael Carbajal–Josué Camacho undercard in Phoenix for the NABF super flyweight title, winning in three rounds. Five days later the Albuquerque Police claimed they found cocaine after the fight in a bag carried by Tapia. Tapia claimed what the police found was only a soap bar, and the charges were eventually dropped.

==== First world title ====
On October 12, 1994 at The Pit, Albuquerque, New Mexico, Tapia defeated Henry Martínez in eleven rounds to win the vacant WBO super flyweight title. He then knocked out former champion Rolando Bohol in the second round. In his first title defense, Tapia defeated Jose Rafael Sosa by decision.

He retained the title with a nine-round technical draw with Ricardo Vargas and a decision in twelve against his onetime nemesis in the amateur ranks, Arthur Johnson. After two more wins, he gave Willy Salazar a title shot, knocking him out in nine rounds. In 1996, he fought six more times, keeping his undefeated record and defending the title five additional times during that period, which included wins against Giovanni Andrade, Ivan Alvarez, future champion Hugo Rafael Soto, Sammy Stewart and Adonis Cruz. By then, a heated rivalry was cooking up between him and IBF champion Danny Romero. Their rivalry had begun many years earlier when Romero's father trained both boxers. Tapia's split with the Romero family had not been on good terms.

==== Tapia vs Romero unification ====
1997 saw Tapia fend off a challenge from Jorge Barrera in three rounds. After that, the fight with Romero was set for Las Vegas. The fight took place on July 18. Tapia won by a unanimous twelve-round decision, adding the IBF title to his WBO belt. In his next fight, he defeated Puerto Rico's Andy Agosto via decision to retain the titles. Tapia began 1998 by successfully defending his championships for the 11th time against former world champion Rodolfo Blanco of Colombia via decision, and then he vacated his world titles in order to move up in weight.

=== Bantamweight ===
On December 5, 1998, Tapia defeated WBA bantamweight champion Nana Konadu by decision to become a two-division world champion.

==== Tapia vs. Ayala ====
In 1999, Tapia suffered his first loss in his 48-bout career, losing a decision and the WBA title to Paulie Ayala in what The Ring Magazine called its "Fight of the Year." Later that year, Tapia tried to commit suicide with a drug overdose and required hospitalization. Back quickly after that, he was given a shot at the WBO title. He became a two time world bantamweight champion by beating Jorge Eliecer Julio by a decision at Albuquerque on January 8, 2000. After he defended his belt with a decision over Javier Torres, a rematch with Ayala to unify the belt was set up. Ayala won by unanimous decision in a fight that ring observers largely felt Tapia won; following the fight, Showtime commentators said that Tapia "put on a clinic" and "something's not right," nearly labeling the decision as rigged.

=== Featherweight ===
Tapia returned home to prepare for bouts in 2001, when he went up in weight and beat Famosito Gomez by a knockout in six, and former WBC featherweight champion Cesar Soto by knockout in three.

In 2002, Tapia traveled to London, where he knocked out Eduardo Enrique Alvarez in the first round; after the bout, he was interviewed by former rival Romero. Tapia's next bout, for the IBF featherweight title, was versus Manuel Medina. Tapia won a dubious decision, becoming a world title holder in three different divisions. He left the title vacant so he could face Lineal & The Ring champion Marco Antonio Barrera, who beat Tapia by unanimous decision.

=== Comeback ===
Tapia returned on the night of October 4, 2003, defeating Carlos Contreras by ten round unanimous decision at Albuquerque.

On April 15, 2005, he sustained an injury to his left eye, but was able to continue and win a repeat match-up with Frankie Archuleta. That win came by ten round split decision in Albuquerque.

At 38, Tapia faced little-known Sandro Marcos in Chicago. In the second round, Marcos connected with a left hook to the body. Tapia fell to the canvas, clutching his ribcage, as referee Genaro Rodriguez reached the count of 10.

=== Later career and problems ===
On January 17, 2007, Tapia held a press conference stating that he would face Ilido Julio on February 23 in his home town of Albuquerque, New Mexico, then retire. The bout was being promoted as The Final Fury and Tapia promised he would win. Tapia won the fight by majority decision, 98–92, 96–94, 95–95.

Tapia was found unconscious and not breathing in a hotel room early on the morning of March 12, 2007. Tapia was hospitalized in critical condition from an apparent cocaine overdose at Albuquerque Presbyterian Hospital.

The next day, on the morning of March 13, Tapia's brother-in-law and nephew were killed in an automobile accident on U.S. Highway 550 near Bloomfield, New Mexico, apparently en route to the hospital to visit Tapia. That same day, Tapia was upgraded from critical to serious condition.

Tapia was scheduled to make a comeback on May 2, 2008, in El Paso, Texas, but pulled out due to contractual disputes with promoter Ron Weathers.

On February 11, 2009, Tapia was taken into custody in Albuquerque for a violation of parole related to cocaine use.

Tapia beat Jorge Alberto Reyes by a knockout in the 4th round on March 6, 2010, at the Ohkay Casino, San Juan Pueblo, New Mexico, United States, in front of a sold-out crowd.

== Personal life ==
Tapia was married to Teresa Tapia in 1994 and had three boys. The family lived in Albuquerque, NM.

He had many tattoos, which were prominent when he was fighting. One of them said Mi Vida Loca ("My Crazy Life"), the nickname he adopted. He wrote an autobiography by that title. He was a born-again Christian.

In 2010, at age 43, Tapia learned that apparently, his father was alive. Jerry Padilla, who Tapia already knew, was supposedly intrigued by the similarities in their mannerisms, and the two decided to submit to a DNA test, which proved they were father and son. After Tapia died in 2012, his widow briefly married his alleged half-brother, Jeffrey Padilla, in 2014. However, she felt it wrong that the senior Padilla had “jokingly” mingled his DNA swabs with Tapia in 2010, getting a court order to compare a new and controlled swab with some of Tapia's tissue, proving in 2017 that they were not father and son.

=== Death ===
On May 27, 2012, Tapia was found dead in his Albuquerque home. He was 45 years old. Tapia died of heart failure.

== Professional boxing record ==
66 fights	59 wins	5 losses
By knockout	30	1
By decision	29	4
Draws	2	

No.	Result	Record	Opponent	Type	Round, time	Date	Location	Notes
66	Win	59–5–2	Mauricio Pastrana	UD	8	Jun 4, 2011	Hard Rock Hotel & Casino, Albuquerque, New Mexico, U.S.	
65	Win	58–5–2	Jose Alonso	TKO	4 (10), 1:43	Sep 24, 2010	Hard Rock Hotel & Casino, Albuquerque, New Mexico, U.S.	Won vacant IBC Americas lightweight title
64	Win	57–5–2	Jorge Alberto Reyes	TKO	4, 1:09	Mar 6, 2010	Hotel Casino, Ohkay Owingeh, New Mexico, U.S.	
63	Win	56–5–2	Evaristo Primero	MD	10	Feb 23, 2007	Isleta Resort & Casino, Albuquerque, New Mexico, U.S.	
62	Loss	55–5–2	Sandro Marcos	KO	2 (10), 2:59	Sep 16, 2005	Aragon Ballroom, Chicago, Illinois, U.S.	
61	Win	55–4–2	Frankie Archuleta	UD	10	Apr 15, 2005	Tingley Coliseum, Albuquerque, New Mexico, U.S.	
60	Win	54–4–2	Nicky Bentz	SD	10	Jan 22, 2005	Dodge Arena, Hidalgo, Texas, U.S.	
59	Loss	53–4–2	Frankie Archuleta	SD	10	Mar 5, 2004	Highlands University, Las Vegas, New Mexico, U.S.	
58	Win	53–3–2	Carlos Contreras	UD	10	Sep 26, 2003	Tingley Coliseum, Albuquerque, New Mexico, U.S.	
57	Loss	52–3–2	Marco Antonio Barrera	UD	12	Nov 2, 2002	MGM Grand Garden Arena, Paradise, Nevada, U.S.	For The Ring featherweight title
56	Win	52–2–2	Manuel Medina	MD	12	Apr 27, 2002	Madison Square Garden, New York City, New York, U.S.	Won IBF featherweight title
55	Win	51–2–2	Eduardo Enrique Alvarez	TKO	1 (10), 1:22	Jan 19, 2002	York Hall, London, England	
54	Win	50–2–2	César Soto	KO	3 (10), 2:47	Jun 30, 2001	Mandalay Bay Events Center, Paradise, Nevada, U.S.	
53	Win	49–2–2	Cuauhtemoc Gomez	RTD	6 (10), 3:00	Mar 17, 2001	Convention Center, Albuquerque, New Mexico, U.S.	
52	Loss	48–2–2	Paulie Ayala	UD	12	Oct 7, 2000	MGM Grand Garden Arena, Paradise, Nevada, U.S.	
51	Win	48–1–2	Pedro Javier Torres	UD	12	May 6, 2000	Pan American Center, Las Cruces, New Mexico, U.S.	Retained WBO bantamweight title
50	Win	47–1–2	Jorge Eliécer Julio	UD	12	Jan 8, 2000	The Pit, Albuquerque, New Mexico, U.S.	Won WBO bantamweight title
49	Loss	46–1–2	Paulie Ayala	UD	12	Jun 26, 1999	Mandalay Bay Events Center, Paradise, Nevada, U.S.	Lost WBA bantamweight title
48	Win	46–0–2	Alberto Martinez	KO	1 (10), 1:43	Apr 24, 1999	Tingley Coliseum, Albuquerque, New Mexico, U.S.	
47	Win	45–0–2	Nana Konadu	MD	12	Dec 5, 1998	Convention Hall, Atlantic City, New Jersey, U.S.	Won WBA bantamweight title
46	Win	44–0–2	Carlos Francis Hernandez	UD	10	Aug 29, 1998	Las Vegas Hilton, Winchester, Nevada, U.S.	
45	Win	43–0–2	Rodolfo Blanco	UD	12	Feb 13, 1998	The Pit, Albuquerque, New Mexico, U.S.	Retained IBF and WBO super flyweight titles
44	Win	42–0–2	Andy Agosto	UD	12	Dec 13, 1997	Amphitheater, Pompano Beach, Florida, U.S.	Retained IBF and WBO super flyweight titles
43	Win	41–0–2	Danny Romero	UD	12	Jul 18, 1997	Thomas & Mack Center, Paradise, Nevada, U.S.	Retained WBO super flyweight title; Won IBF super flyweight title
42	Win	40–0–2	Jorge Barrera	TKO	3 (12), 1:58	Mar 8, 1997	Convention Center, Albuquerque, New Mexico, U.S.	Retained WBO super flyweight title
41	Win	39–0–2	Adonis Cruz	UD	12	Nov 30, 1996	Tingley Coliseum, Albuquerque, New Mexico, U.S.	Retained WBO super flyweight title
40	Win	38–0–2	Sammy Stewart	TKO	7 (12), 1:44	Oct 11, 1996	Texas Station, North Las Vegas, Nevada, U.S.	Retained WBO super flyweight title
39	Win	37–0–2	Hugo Rafael Soto	UD	12	Aug 17, 1996	Sports Stadium, Albuquerque, New Mexico, U.S.	Retained WBO super flyweight title
38	Win	36–0–2	Ivan Alvarez	TKO	8 (12), 1:31	Jun 7, 1996	Caesars Palace, Paradise, Nevada, U.S.	Retained WBO super flyweight title
37	Win	35–0–2	Ramon Gonzales	TKO	2 (10), 0:45	Apr 30, 1996	San Antonio, Texas, U.S.	
36	Win	34–0–2	Giovanni Andrade	TKO	2 (12), 2:26	Feb 3, 1996	Great Western Forum, Inglewood, California, U.S.	Retained WBO super flyweight title
35	Win	33–0–2	Willy Salazar	RTD	9 (12), 3:00	Dec 1, 1995	Fantasy Springs Resort Casino, Indio, California, U.S.	Retained WBO super flyweight title
34	Win	32–0–2	Raul Rios	UD	10	Oct 19, 1995	Boulder Station Hotel Casino, Sunrise Manor, Nevada, U.S.	
33	Win	31–0–2	Jesse Miranda	UD	10	Sep 9, 1995	Caesars Palace, Paradise, Nevada, U.S.	
32	Win	30–0–2	Arthur Johnson	MD	12	Jul 2, 1995	Johnson Gymnasium, Albuquerque, New Mexico, U.S.	Retained WBO super flyweight title
31	Draw	29–0–2	Ricardo Vargas	TD	8 (12)	May 6, 1995	Caesars Palace, Paradise, Nevada, U.S.	Retained WBO super flyweight title; Majority TD after Vargas was cut from an accidental head clash
30	Win	29–0–1	Jose Rafael Sosa	UD	12	Feb 10, 1995	The Pit, Albuquerque, New Mexico, U.S.	Retained WBO super flyweight title
29	Win	28–0–1	Rolando Bohol	KO	2 (10), 2:21	Dec 8, 1994	Convention Center, Albuquerque, New Mexico, U.S.	
28	Win	27–0–1	Henry Martínez	TKO	11 (12), 1:23	Oct 12, 1994	The Pit, Albuquerque, New Mexico, U.S.	Won vacant WBO super flyweight title
27	Win	26–0–1	Oscar Aguilar	TKO	3 (12)	Jul 15, 1994	America West Arena, Phoenix, Arizona, U.S.	Won vacant NABF super flyweight title
26	Win	25–0–1	Rafael Granillo	TKO	9 (10), 2:15	Jun 24, 1994	Grand Olympic Auditorium, Los Angeles, California, U.S.	
25	Win	24–0–1	Antonio Ruiz	UD	10	May 5, 1994	Grand Olympic Auditorium, Los Angeles, California, U.S.	
24	Win	23–0–1	Arturo Estrada	TKO	2 (10), 1:45	Apr 15, 1994	Kiva Auditorium, Albuquerque, New Mexico, U.S.	
23	Win	22–0–1	Jaime Olvera	KO	4 (8), 1:08	Mar 27, 1994	Expo Square Pavilion, Tulsa, Oklahoma, U.S.	
22	Win	21–0–1	Santiago Caballero	TD	7 (12)	Oct 26, 1990	Bally's Las Vegas, Paradise, Nevada, U.S.	Retained USBA super flyweight title; Unanimous TD after Tapia was accidentally thumbed in the eye
21	Win	20–0–1	Luigi Camputaro	UD	12	Sep 20, 1990	Bally's Las Vegas, Paradise, Nevada, U.S.	Retained USBA super flyweight title
20	Win	19–0–1	Jose Montiel	TKO	9 (12), 2:07	Jul 27, 1990	Bally's Las Vegas, Paradise, Nevada, U.S.	Retained USBA super flyweight title
19	Win	18–0–1	Pablo Valenzuela	KO	5 (12), 2:36	Jun 21, 1990	La Mancha Athletic Club, Phoenix, Arizona, U.S.	Retained USBA super flyweight title
18	Win	17–0–1	Roland Gomez	TKO	11 (12), 1:27	May 10, 1990	Harrah's Lake Tahoe, Stateline, Nevada, U.S.	Won vacant USBA super flyweight title
17	Win	16–0–1	Abraham Garcia	TKO	1 (10)	Mar 16, 1990	Convention Center, Phoenix, Arizona, U.S.	
16	Win	15–0–1	Jesus Chong	UD	8	Feb 16, 1990	Hacienda, Paradise, Nevada, U.S.	
15	Win	14–0–1	Martin Perez Ramirez	UD	8	Dec 1, 1989	Hacienda, Paradise, Nevada, U.S.	
14	Win	13–0–1	Prudencio De Jesus	TKO	1	Nov 17, 1989	Convention Center, Phoenix, Arizona, U.S.	
13	Win	12–0–1	John Michael Johnson	UD	8	Oct 17, 1989	State Fair, Phoenix, Arizona, U.S.	
12	Win	11–0–1	Hugo Partida	KO	2 (10)	Aug 19, 1989	State Fairgrounds, Albuquerque, New Mexico, U.S.	
11	Win	10–0–1	Josefino Suarez	UD	8	Jun 17, 1989	Tingley Coliseum, Albuquerque, New Mexico, U.S.	
10	Win	9–0–1	Fred Hernandez	UD	8	Mar 23, 1989	Marriott Hotel, Irvine, California, U.S.	
9	Win	8–0–1	Abner Barajas	TKO	2 (8)	Feb 17, 1989	State Fair Pavilion, Albuquerque, New Mexico, U.S.	
8	Win	7–0–1	Simon Contreras	UD	8	Dec 1, 1988	Marriott Hotel, Irvine, California, U.S.	
7	Win	6–0–1	Jorge Salinas	TKO	1, 2:35	Oct 14, 1988	Caesars Palace, Paradise, Nevada, U.S.	
6	Win	5–0–1	Manuel Martinez	KO	1 (6)	Sep 29, 1988	Marriott Hotel, Irvine, California, U.S.	
5	Win	4–0–1	Miguel Martinez	KO	1 (6), 2:02	Sep 16, 1988	Caesars Palace, Paradise, Nevada, U.S.	
4	Win	3–0–1	Martin Perez Ramirez	TKO	1 (6), 1:51	Jun 30, 1988	Marriott Hotel, Irvine, California, U.S.	
3	Win	2–0–1	Norberto Ayala	KO	4 (4)	May 16, 1988	Centre Plaza Holiday Inn, Fresno, California, U.S.	
2	Win	1–0–1	James Dean	UD	6	Apr 11, 1988	Centre Plaza Holiday Inn, Fresno, California, U.S.	
1	Draw	0–0–1	Efren Chavez	MD	4	Mar 28, 1988	Marriott Hotel, Irvine, California, U.S.	

== Titles in boxing ==
=== Major world titles ===
- IBF super flyweight champion (115 lbs)
- WBO super flyweight champion (115 lbs)
- WBA bantamweight champion (118 lbs)
- WBO bantamweight champion (118 lbs)
- IBF featherweight champion (126 lbs)

=== Regional/International titles ===
- USBA super flyweight champion (115 lbs)
- NABF super flyweight champion (115 lbs)
- IBC Americas lightweight champion (135 lbs)

== See also ==
- List of boxing triple champions
- List of WBA world champions
- List of IBF world champions
- List of WBO world champions

Sporting positions
Amateur boxing titles
Previous: Jose Rosario	U.S. Golden Gloves light flyweight champion 1983	Next: Israel Acosta
Previous: Les Fabri	U.S. Golden Gloves flyweight champion 1985	Next: Tony Wilson
Regional boxing titles
Vacant Title last held by Robert Quiroga	USBA super flyweight champion May 10, 1990 – May 1992; Vacated	Vacant Title next held by John Michael Johnson
Vacant Title last held by Marco Antonio Barrera	NABF super flyweight champion July 15, 1994 – October 1994; Vacated	Vacant Title next held by Danny Romero
Vacant Title last held by Josh Sosa	IBC Americas lightweight champion September 24, 2010 – June 2011; Vacated	Vacant
World boxing titles
Vacant Title last held by Johnny Bredahl	WBO super flyweight champion October 12, 1994 – December 1998; Vacated	Vacant Title next held by Victor Godoi
Preceded by Danny Romero	IBF super flyweight champion July 18, 1997 – December 22, 1998; Vacated	Vacant Title next held by Mark Johnson
Preceded by Nana Konadu	WBA bantamweight champion December 5, 1998 – June 26, 1999	Succeeded by Paulie Ayala
Preceded by Jorge Eliécer Julio	WBO bantamweight champion January 8 – August 16, 2000; Vacated	Vacant Title next held by Mauricio Martínez
Preceded by Manuel Medina	IBF featherweight champion April 27 – October 1, 2002; Stripped	Vacant Title next held by Juan Manuel Márquez
