= Barrera vs. Morales trilogy =

Boxing competitions

The Barrera versus Morales trilogy is one of boxing's most famous fight trilogies, involving two of Mexico's most revered boxers, Marco Antonio Barrera (nicknamed "The Baby Faced Assassin") and Erik "El Terrible" Morales.

== Fight history ==
=== Background ===
Barrera had been the WBO super bantamweight champion in the mid 1990s. Morales, from his part, was undefeated and he had won the WBC super bantamweight title, knocking out Daniel Zaragoza (being the first person to do so) in eleven rounds in 1997. Promoters soon began arrangements for a bout between the WBC and WBO super bantamweight title holders.

=== First bout ===
The first bout took place on February 19, 2000, at the Mandalay Bay Resort and Casino, in Las Vegas and was televised on HBO Boxing. Morales was declared winner by split decision, with scores of 115–112, 114–113 and 113–114 and captured the WBO Super Bantamweight title. Many believed that Barrera deserved the decision. This bout was named as Ring Magazine's Fight of the Year for 2000, before being named as the best fight of all time in the same year.

=== Second bout ===
The second bout took place on June 22, 2002, in MGM Grand Garden Arena, Las Vegas. After the impact their first fight had on many of those that saw it, their second fight was made a Pay Per View event.

This is often described as the most tactical fight of the trilogy. Nevertheless, there were plenty of punches, but with Barrera fighting a more technical approach, Morales opted to use heavier punches, dropping Barrera to the canvas in the 7th with a blow to the abdomen, which was subsequently ruled a trip by referee Jay Nady. Barrera was nonetheless declared the winner by unanimous decision, with scores of 116–112 and 115–113 and captured the WBC Featherweight title. Many believed that Morales deserved the decision.

=== Third bout ===
The third and final bout of the trilogy was fought at the Super Featherweight division. Morales had gone on to win the WBC title in that division after defeating Jesús Chávez and Barrera had lost recognition as world boxing champion after being defeated by Filipino boxer Manny Pacquiao, so he moved up to the Super Featherweight division. The fight took place on November 27, 2004, at the MGM Grand in Las Vegas. Barrera was declared the winner and new WBC Super Featherweight champion by majority decision, with scores of 115–113, 115–114, and 114–114. This bout was named Ring Magazine's Fight of the Year for 2004.

=== Afterwards ===
Barrera and Morales later became friends. The two hosted a show on YouTube, named "Un Round Mas" ("One More Round") where they spoke about boxing fights, entertainment, politics and other topics. However, the show was promptly cancelled and the two claimed to have only a professional relationship. In late March 2022, the podcast was relaunched.
