= Paulie Ayala =

American boxer (born 1970)

Personal information
- Nationality: American
- Born: Paul Anthony Ayala; April 22, 1970 (age 56) Fort Worth, Texas, U.S.
- Height: 5 ft 5 1/2 in (166 cm)
- Weight: Bantamweight; Super bantamweight; Featherweight

Boxing career
- Reach: 66 in (168 cm)
- Stance: Southpaw

Boxing record
- Total fights: 38
- Wins: 35
- Win by KO: 12
- Losses: 3

Paul Anthony "Paulie" Ayala (born April 22, 1970) is an American former professional boxer who competed from 1992 to 2004. He is a world champion in two weight classes, having held the World Boxing Association (WBA) bantamweight title from 1999 to 2001, and the Ring magazine super bantamweight title from 2002 to 2004. In 1999, he was voted "Fighter of the Year" by The Ring magazine for his first bout against Johnny Tapia, which also won "Fight of the Year" honors.

== Professional career ==
Ayala began his professional fighting career with a six-round decision win over Jaime Olvera on November 27, 1992. He had seven fights in 1993, including one against future NABO champion and world title challenger Jesse Magana. Ayala won all seven of those bouts, four by knockout. Magana was knocked out in the fourth round, after which Ayala went on to score wins over prospects Evgeny Novoselov and George Acevedo.

In 1994, he won all four of his bouts, including one over veteran Lee Cargle. Cargle was knocked out by Ayala in round three. 1995 was a productive year for Ayala, who won all five of his fights, including his first regional championship bout. By defeating Mike Espinoza by knockout in three rounds at the Fort Worth Convention Center, Ayala claimed the NABF bantamweight title. He defended it twice before the end of the year, beating Mario Diaz and Sergio Millan, both by decision in 12 rounds.

Ayala only had two fights in 1996, both of them successful defenses of his NABF title. In the first, he knocked out Roland Gomez in seven rounds but was forced to take a seven-month layoff due to a broken Hand. Returning to the ring in September, Ayala defeated Ivan Alvarez by a decision in twelve to retain the NABF bantamweight title.

He began 1997 by defeating Cuauhtemoc Gomez by decision in twelve, once again retaining his belt as the headliner at the Tropicana Casino in Atlantic City, New Jersey. Ayala won three more bouts that year, defeating heavy-handed puncher Nestor Lopez in a co-main event feature on an HBO pay-per-view card, headlining at The Orleans in Paradise, Nevada with a fifth-round knockout over Roberto Lopez to retain the NABF belt. This was followed by another HBO PPV appearance, in which Ayala won a unanimous decision against Ricardo Medina.

At the beginning of 1998, Ayala was very close to a world championship bout. Fighting two more bouts, he received his first chance at a world title by becoming the mandatory contender for the WBC belt. Ayala then traveled to Japan to challenge WBC bantamweight champion Joichiro Tatsuyoshi on August 23. Ayala lost the fight by a sixth-round technical decision when the fight was stopped due to a cut. Tatsuyoshi came out fast in the opening rounds, but Ayala rallied back to win the fifth and sixth rounds unanimously. During the fight, an accidental clash of heads caused a cut and Ayala was docked 2 points. The fight was stopped in round seven due to the severity of the cut, sending the decision to the scorecards and thereby handing victory to Tatsuyoshi.

=== WBA bantamweight title ===
After a win against Ivan Salazar, Ayala began 1999 by beating David Vazquez by a decision ten. Unable to secure a rematch with Tatsuyoshi, Ayala nonetheless got his second chance at becoming a world champion, this time against WBA bantamweight champion Johnny Tapia. The fight took place in Las Vegas on June 26. Ayala handed Tapia his first career loss and became world champion by winning a twelve-round unanimous decision, in what turned out to be both Ayala's Showtime debut and The Ring magazine's Fight of the Year for 1999.

Ayala retained his title against WBA #1 contender Sithai Condo before the end of that year, earning The Ring magazine Fighter of the Year honours. In his second title defense, he defeated Johnny Bredahl via a twelve-round decision. On October 7, 2000, Ayala and Tapia met in a rematch for the vacant IBA featherweight title, at a catchweight of 124 lbs. As with the first fight, this took place on Showtime. Due to Tapia being unable to make the bantamweight limit, Ayala's WBA bantamweight title was not at stake. Ayala defeated Tapia once again by a twelve-round unanimous decision.

On March 30, 2001, Ayala recovered from a fourth-round knockdown to retain his WBA bantamweight title with a twelve-round decision against Hugo Dianzo in an ESPN telecast bout. Ayala then vacated his title to move up in weight.

=== Super bantamweight ===
On August 4, 2001, Ayala challenged world champion Clarence Adams, who had vacated his WBA super bantamweight title to face Ayala for the vacant IBO title. Ayala defeated Adams via split decision. In a rematch of their closely contested bout, Ayala successfully defended his IBO title by defeating Adams in a wide unanimous decision. Both bouts were featured on HBO telecasts.

=== Featherweight ===
Continuing his rise in weight, on November 16, 2002, Ayala met world champion Erik Morales for the vacant WBC featherweight title, this time winding up on the losing end of a twelve-round unanimous decision.

Ayala returned to the ring on November 15, 2003, dropping back down to super bantamweight and defeating Edel Ruiz in a ten-round unanimous decision in Fort Worth, Texas. On June 19, 2004, in Los Angeles, Ayala once again ventured into the featherweight division losing against fellow former world champion Marco Antonio Barrera. In September of that year, Ayala surprised many of his boxing fans by announcing his retirement from the sport.

=== "Punching Out Parkinson's" Program ===
Following retirement, Ayala has contributed to helping those who suffer from Parkinson's disease. In Fort Worth, Texas at his University of Hard Knocks gym, Ayala started a program to help Parkinson's patients. Using his expertise, he teaches non-contact boxing techniques to regain coordination, strength and balance to improve the quality of life for his students and create an environment of camaraderie.

== Professional boxing record ==
| 38 fights | 35 wins | 3 losses |
|---|---|---|
| By knockout | 12 | 1 |
| By decision | 23 | 2 |

| No. | Result | Record | Opponent | Type | Round, time | Date | Location | Notes |
|---|---|---|---|---|---|---|---|---|
| 38 | Loss | 35–3 | Marco Antonio Barrera | TKO | 10 (12), 2:34 | Jun 19, 2004 | Home Depot Center, Carson, California, U.S. | |
| 37 | Win | 35–2 | Edel Ruiz | UD | 10 | Nov 14, 2003 | Tarrant County Convention Center, Fort Worth, Texas, U.S. | |
| 36 | Loss | 34–2 | Erik Morales | UD | 12 | Nov 16, 2002 | Mandalay Bay Events Center, Paradise, Nevada, U.S. | For vacant WBC featherweight title |
| 35 | Win | 34–1 | Clarence Adams | UD | 12 | Feb 23, 2002 | Mandalay Bay Events Center, Paradise, Nevada, U.S. | Retained IBO super bantamweight title; Won vacant The Ring super bantamweight title |
| 34 | Win | 33–1 | Clarence Adams | SD | 12 | Aug 4, 2001 | Mandalay Bay Events Center, Paradise, Nevada, U.S. | Won vacant IBO super bantamweight title |
| 33 | Win | 32–1 | Hugo Dianzo | UD | 12 | Mar 30, 2001 | Tarrant County Convention Center, Fort Worth, Texas, U.S. | Retained WBA bantamweight title |
| 32 | Win | 31–1 | Johnny Tapia | UD | 12 | Oct 7, 2000 | MGM Grand Garden Arena, Paradise, Nevada, U.S. | |
| 31 | Win | 30–1 | Johnny Bredahl | MD | 12 | Mar 4, 2000 | Mandalay Bay Events Center, Paradise, Nevada, U.S. | Retained WBA bantamweight title |
| 30 | Win | 29–1 | Anupong Saohin Srisuk | UD | 12 | Oct 23, 1999 | Will Rogers Memorial Center, Fort Worth, Texas, U.S. | Retained WBA bantamweight title |
| 29 | Win | 28–1 | Johnny Tapia | UD | 12 | Jun 26, 1999 | Mandalay Bay Events Center, Paradise, Nevada, U.S. | Won WBA bantamweight title |
| 28 | Win | 27–1 | David Vazquez | UD | 10 | Feb 20, 1999 | Will Rogers Memorial Center, Fort Worth, Texas, U.S. | |
| 27 | Win | 26–1 | Ivan Salazar | KO | 4 (8) | Nov 14, 1998 | County Coliseum, El Paso, Texas, U.S. | |
| 26 | Loss | 25–1 | Joichiro Tatsuyoshi | TD | 6 (12), 3:00 | Aug 23, 1998 | Arena, Yokohama, Japan | For WBC bantamweight title |
| 25 | Win | 25–0 | Antonio Ramirez | TKO | 7 (10) | May 16, 1998 | Fantasy Springs Resort Casino, Indio, California, U.S. | |
| 24 | Win | 24–0 | Elias Paulin | KO | 4 (10), 0:47 | Feb 11, 1998 | Tarrant County Convention Center, Fort Worth, Texas, U.S. | |
| 23 | Win | 23–0 | Ricardo Medina | UD | 10 | Sep 13, 1997 | Thomas & Mack Center, Paradise, Nevada, U.S. | |
| 22 | Win | 22–0 | Roberto Lopez | TKO | 5 (12), 2:43 | Aug 8, 1997 | Orleans Hotel & Casino, Paradise, Nevada, U.S. | Retained NABF bantamweight title |
| 21 | Win | 21–0 | Nestor Lopez | UD | 10 | Apr 12, 1997 | Thomas & Mack Center, Paradise, Nevada, U.S. | |
| 20 | Win | 20–0 | Cuauhtemoc Gomez | UD | 12 | Jan 11, 1997 | Tropicana Hotel & Casino, Paradise, Nevada, U.S. | Retained NABF bantamweight title |
| 19 | Win | 19–0 | Ivan Alvarez | UD | 12 | Sep 28, 1996 | Will Rogers Memorial Center, Fort Worth, Texas, U.S. | Retained NABF bantamweight title |
| 18 | Win | 18–0 | Roland Gomez | TKO | 7 (12), 1:00 | Feb 22, 1996 | Corpus Christi, Texas, U.S. | Retained NABF bantamweight title |
| 17 | Win | 17–0 | Jose Rangel | TKO | 3 (10) | Dec 6, 1995 | Tarrant County Convention Center, Fort Worth, Texas, U.S. | |
| 16 | Win | 16–0 | Sergio Millan | UD | 12 | Sep 9, 1995 | Will Rogers Memorial Center, Fort Worth, Texas, U.S. | Retained NABF bantamweight title |
| 15 | Win | 15–0 | Mario Diaz | UD | 12 | Jun 20, 1995 | Will Rogers Memorial Center, Fort Worth, Texas, U.S. | Retained NABF bantamweight title |
| 14 | Win | 14–0 | Miguel Espinoza | TKO | 3 (12), 2:27 | Mar 10, 1995 | Tarrant County Convention Center, Fort Worth, Texas, U.S. | Won vacant NABF bantamweight title |
| 13 | Win | 13–0 | Juan Mendoza | UD | 10 | Jan 26, 1995 | Expo Hall, Shreveport, Louisiana, U.S. | |
| 12 | Win | 12–0 | Juan Francisco Soto | UD | 10 | Dec 2, 1994 | Tarrant County Convention Center, Fort Worth, Texas, U.S. | |
| 11 | Win | 11–0 | Julian Flores | UD | 10 | Aug 23, 1994 | Cowtown Coliseum, Fort Worth, Texas, U.S. | |
| 10 | Win | 10–0 | Lee Cargle | TKO | 3 (8), 1:52 | Apr 16, 1994 | Country Palace, Moore, Oklahoma, U.S. | |
| 9 | Win | 9–0 | Javier Diaz | UD | 8 | Feb 17, 1994 | Tarrant County Convention Center, Fort Worth, Texas, U.S. | |
| 8 | Win | 8–0 | George Acevedo | PTS | 6 | Dec 9, 1993 | Paramount Theatre, New York City, New York, U.S. | |
| 7 | Win | 7–0 | Enrique Gomez | TKO | 1 (8) | Nov 11, 1993 | Tarrant County Convention Center, Fort Worth, Texas, U.S. | |
| 6 | Win | 6–0 | Arturo Estrada | UD | 6 | Oct 13, 1993 | Marriott Riverwalk, San Antonio, Texas, U.S. | |
| 5 | Win | 5–0 | Marcos Flores | KO | 1 (4) | Aug 28, 1993 | Gorman's Super Pro Gym, Fort Worth, Texas, U.S. | |
| 4 | Win | 4–0 | Evgeny Novoselov | UD | 6 | Jun 24, 1993 | Villa Roma Resort, Callicoon, New York, U.S. | |
| 3 | Win | 3–0 | Manuel Robles | TKO | 2 (?) | Apr 2, 1993 | Dallas, Texas, U.S. | |
| 2 | Win | 2–0 | Armando Morado | TKO | 4 (6) | Mar 5, 1993 | Rocket Fiesta Palace, Dallas, Texas, U.S. | |
| 1 | Win | 1–0 | Jaime Olvera | PTS | 6 | Nov 27, 1992 | Dallas, Texas, U.S. | |

== Titles in boxing ==
=== Major world titles ===
- WBA bantamweight champion (118 lbs)

=== The Ring magazine titles ===
- The Ring super bantamweight champion (122 lbs)

=== Minor world titles ===
- IBO super bantamweight champion (122 lbs)

=== Regional/International titles ===
- NABF bantamweight champion] (118 lbs)

== See also ==
- List of southpaw stance boxers
- List of Mexican boxing world champions
- List of world bantamweight boxing champions

Sporting positions
Regional boxing titles
| Vacant Title last held by Wayne McCullough | NABF bantamweight champion March 10, 1995 – 1998; Vacated | Vacant Title next held by Adan Vargas |
Minor World boxing titles
| Vacant Title last held by Simon Ramoni | IBO super bantamweight champion August 4, 2001 – 2002; Vacated | Vacant Title next held by Zolani Marali |
Major World boxing titles
| Preceded by Johnny Tapia | WBA bantamweight champion June 26, 1999 – August 7, 2001; Stripped | Vacant Title next held by Eidy Moya |
| Vacant Title last held by Wilfredo Gómez | The Ring super bantamweight champion February 23, 2002 – May 5, 2004; Vacated | Vacant Title next held by Israel Vázquez |
Awards
| Previous: Ivan Robinson vs. Arturo Gatti I | The Ring Fight of the Year vs. Johnny Tapia I 1999 | Succeeded by Erik Morales vs. Marco Antonio Barrera |
