= Triple champion =

Sportsman who won three distinctions

In certain sports, when a sportsman wins three crowns, titles, medals, belts or other distinctions, the athlete is called a triple champion.

== Boxing ==
In boxing, a triple champion is a boxer who has won world titles in three weight classes.

For most of the 20th century it was a remarkable achievement, possibly securing one a spot in the International Boxing Hall of Fame with other immortals of the sport. Beginning in the 1970s, triple champions have become increasingly more common because of the numerous weight divisions (17) and the countless professional boxing entities that claim a "world" championship.

The first triple champion of boxing was Bob Fitzsimmons when he added the Light Heavyweight (175 lbs) crown to his World Middleweight (160 lbs) and Heavyweight (200+ lbs) belts on November 25, 1903.

Barney Ross was the first boxer to simultaneously hold world titles in two different weight classes when he won World Lightweight (135 lbs) title and World Light Welterweight (140 lbs) against Tony Canzoneri on June 23, 1933. Later Ross won the World Welterweight (147 lbs) Title from Jimmy McLarnin on May 28, 1934.

Henry Armstrong was the first man to hold three titles in three divisions simultaneously. He won the World Featherweight (126 lbs) title from Petey Sarron on October 29, 1937, the World Welterweight (147) title from Barney Ross on May 31, 1938, and won the World Lightweight Title (135 lbs) in his next fight, on August 17 against Lou Ambers. Armstrong then immediately vacated the Featherweight Title because he could no longer make the weight.

Wilfred Benítez was the youngest ever champion at any weight. Benitez first won the WBA Light Welterweight (140 lbs) Title from Antonio Cervantes on March 6, 1976, at age 17. He moved up in weight to win the WBC Welterweight (147 lbs) title from Carlos Palomino on January 14, 1979, and finally won a third title when he added the WBC Light Middleweight (154 lbs) title from Maurice Hope on May 23, 1981.

When boxing organizations started to create additional divisions or weight classes (there were only eight divisions originally when modern title lineages began being generally recognized around 1890), it became possible for boxers to reach new milestones in boxing, such as the quadruple and Quintuple Champions.

== Formula One ==
Jack Brabham, Jackie Stewart, Niki Lauda, Nelson Piquet and Ayrton Senna are all triple world champions.

== Touring Car racing ==
Andy Priaulx and José María López both won three world championships.

== See also ==
- List of boxing triple champions
- List of boxing quadruple champions
- List of boxing quintuple champions
- List of boxing sextuple champions
- List of boxing septuple champions
- List of The Ring world champions
- List of WBC world champions
- List of WBA world champions
- List of IBF world champions
- List of WBO world champions
- List of IBO world champions
