= Drew Docherty =

Scottish boxer (born 1965)

Personal information
- Nationality: British (Scottish)
- Born: 19 November 1965 (age 60) Glasgow, Scotland
- Height: 5 ft 6 in (168 cm)
- Weight: Bantamweight, super bantamweight

Boxing career
- Club: Croy Miners Welfare ABC, Croy

Boxing record
- Total fights: 24
- Wins: 16
- Win by KO: 4
- Losses: 7
- Draws: 1

Andrew "Drew" Docherty (born 19 November 1965) is a Scottish former boxer who was British champion at both bantamweight (1992–1997) and super bantamweight (1999). Docherty was from a boxing family, his father Archie boxed and his brother Wilson Docherty was a Scottish international boxer.

== Career ==
=== Amateur ===
Born in Glasgow and based in Condorrat, Docherty represented Scotland as an amateur.

He was a member of the Croy Miners Welfare Amateur Boxing Club in Croy, North Lanarkshire and worked for a construction company in Glasgow. Docherty won both the 1984 and 1985 Scottish light-flyweight title and in March 1986, after moving up in weight, won the 1986 Scottish flyweight championship at Grangemouth, the same night that brother Wilson won the light-flyweight title. Shortly afterwards Docherty represented the Scottish team at the 1986 Commonwealth Games in Edinburgh, Scotland, where he competed in the flyweight division

In 1988, he finished runner-up in the prestigious ABA Championships at Wembley Arena, losing to John Lyon.

=== Professional ===
Docherty made his professional debut in September 1989 with a points win over Gordon Shaw. Unbeaten in his first 8 fights, in June 1992 he stopped defending champion Joe Kelly in the fifth round to become British bantamweight champion. He made a successful defence in January 1993 against Donnie Hood.

In February 1994 he made an unsuccessful attempt at Vincenzo Belcastro's European title at the Kelvin Hall, losing a unanimous points decision. In November he made a second successful defence of his British title against Adey Benton, and in February 1995 challenged for Alfred Kotey's WBO World bantamweight title, the defending champion stopping him in the fourth round.

In 1995 he considered retirement from boxing following the death of Jim Murray but decided to continue to fight.

In October 1995 Docherty made the third defence of his British title against James Murray. Murray collapsed in the twelfth of sheer exhaustion in the final round and Docherty won the Lonsdale Belt outright, but Murray required brain surgery and died the next day. Docherty considered quitting boxing and sought counselling but decided to fight on.

Docherty returned in January 1996 to challenge WBO champion Daniel Jiménez, but was again unsuccessful with the unanimous decision going to Jiminez. Two months later Docherty attempted to win the European bantamweight title, but was stopped in the third round by defending champion Johnny Bredahl. He was due to defend his British title against Paul Lloyd in October 1997 but a knee ligament injury caused the fight to be called off and Docherty was controversially stripped of the title he had held for more than five years. Lloyd went on to take the title, and in September 1998 Docherty faced him at the Barbican Centre in York with Lloyd's Commonwealth title also at stake; LLoyd won on points to retain both titles, with referee Roy Francis scoring it 118-113.

Docherty then moved up to super bantamweight and in April 1999 beat Patrick Mullings to become British champion at a second weight. In October that year he challenged unsuccessfully for Michael Brodie's European title at the York Hall, Bethnal Green. Having relinquished the British title he attempted to regain it from Michael Alldis in November 2000, but was knocked out in the sixth round, and subsequently retired from boxing.

Drew's younger brother Wilson Docherty was also a boxer, winning the World Boxing Board featherweight title in 1994 and going on to fight for British and Commonwealth titles.

== Professional boxing record ==
24 fights	16 wins	7 losses
By knockout	4	4
By decision	12	3
Draws	1	

No.	Result	Record	Opponent	Type	Round, time	Date	Location	Notes
24	Loss	16–7–1	(United Kingdom) Michael Alldis	KO	6 (12)	2000-11-04	(United Kingdom) York Hall, Bethnal Green, London, England	Lost BBBofC British super bantamweight title.
23	Loss	16–6–1	(United Kingdom) Michael Brodie	KO	6 (12), 3:00	1999-10-01	(United Kingdom) York Hall, Bethnal Green, London, England	For EBU European super bantamweight title.
22	Win	16–5–1	(United Kingdom) Patrick Mullings	PTS	12	1999-04-24	(United Kingdom) Planet Ice Rink, Peterborough, England	Won BBBofC British super bantamweight title.
21	Loss	15–5–1	(United Kingdom) Paul Lloyd	PTS	12	1998-09-26	(United Kingdom) York Barbican, York, England	For Commonwealth (British Empire) bantamweight title. Lost BBBofC British bantamweight title.
20	Loss	15–4–1	(Denmark) Johnny Bredahl	TKO	3 (12), 2:36	1997-03-14	Odense Sports Park, Odense, Denmark	Retained EBU European bantamweight title.
19	Loss	15–3–1	(Puerto Rico) Daniel Jiménez	UD	12	1996-01-20	(United Kingdom) Mansfield Leisure Centre, Mansfield, England	For WBO bantamweight title.
18	Win	15–2–1	(United Kingdom) James Murray	KO	12 (12), 2:26	1995-10-13	(United Kingdom) Hospitality Inn, Glasgow, Scotland	Retained BBBofC British bantamweight title. Murray died the following day from injuries sustained in this fight.
17	Loss	14–2–1	(Ghana) Alfred Kotey	TKO	4 (12), 0:50	1995-02-17	(United Kingdom) Tryst Sports Centre, Cumbernauld, Scotland	For WBO bantamweight title.
16	Win	14–1–1	(United Kingdom) Adey Benton	PTS	12	1994-11-23	(United Kingdom) Magnum Centre, Irvine, North Ayrshire, Scotland	Retained BBBofC British bantamweight title.
15	Win	13–1–1	(United Kingdom) Miguel Matthews	PTS	8	1994-09-20	(United Kingdom) Brunton Memorial Hall, Musselburgh, Scotland	
14	Win	12–1–1	(United Kingdom) Conn McMullen	PTS	8	1994-07-09	(United Kingdom) Earls Court Exhibition Hall, Kensington, England	
13	Loss	11–1–1	(Italy) Vincenzo Belcastro	UD	12	1994-02-02	(United Kingdom) Kelvin Hall, Glasgow, Scotland	For EBU European bantamweight title.
12	Win	11–0–1	(United Kingdom) Peter Buckley	PTS	8	1993-10-25	(United Kingdom) St. Andrew's Sporting Club, Glasgow, Scotland	
11	Win	10–0–1	(United Kingdom) Russell Davison	PTS	8	1993-04-26	(United Kingdom) St. Andrew's Sporting Club, Glasgow, Scotland	
10	Win	9–0–1	(United Kingdom) Donnie Hood	PTS	12	1993-01-25	(United Kingdom) St. Andrew's Sporting Club - Albany Hotel, Glasgow, Scotland	Retained BBBofC British bantamweight title.
9	Win	8–0–1	(United Kingdom) Joe Kelly	TKO	5 (12)	1992-06-01	(United Kingdom) Forte Crest Hotel, Glasgow, Scotland	Won BBBofC British bantamweight title.
8	Win	7–0–1	(United Kingdom) Peter Buckley	PTS	8	1992-04-27	(United Kingdom) Forte Crest Hotel, Glasgow, Scotland	
7	Win	6–0–1	(United Kingdom) Neil Parry	TKO	4 (6), 2:10	1992-01-27	(United Kingdom) Forte Crest Hotel, Glasgow, Scotland	
6	Win	5–0–1	(United Kingdom) Stevie Woods	TKO	1 (8), 2:58	1991-11-14	(United Kingdom) St. Andrew's Sporting Club - Sheraton Hotel, Edinburgh, Scotland	
5	Win	4–0–1	(United Kingdom) Peter Buckley	PTS	8	1990-11-21	(United Kingdom) Conference Centre, Solihull, England	
4	Win	3–0–1	(United Kingdom) Steve Robinson	PTS	8	1990-10-03	(United Kingdom) Conference Centre, Solihull, England	
3	Draw	2–0–1	(United Kingdom) Rocky Lawlor	PTS	8	1990-05-09	(United Kingdom) Conference Centre, Solihull, England	
2	Win	2–0	(United Kingdom) Chris Clarkson	PTS	6	1989-11-23	(United Kingdom) Motherwell Civic Centre, Scotland	
1	Win	1–0	(United Kingdom) Gordon Shaw	PTS	6	1989-09-14	(United Kingdom) Motherwell Civic Centre, Scotland	Professional debut.
