= Robbie Regan =

Wales boxer

Personal information
- Nationality: Welsh
- Born: Robbie Regan; 30 August 1968 (age 57) Caerphilly, Wales
- Height: 5 ft 4 in (163 cm)
- Weight: Flyweight; Bantamweight

Boxing career

Boxing record
- Total fights: 22
- Wins: 17
- Win by KO: 7
- Losses: 2
- Draws: 3

Robbie Regan (born 30 August 1968) is a Welsh former professional boxer who competed from 1989 to 1996. He held the WBO bantamweight title in 1996, the IBF interim flyweight title in 1995, and once challenged for the WBO flyweight title in 1995. At regional level, he held the British flyweight title twice between 1991 and 1992, and the Europeam flyweight title twice between 1992 and 1994.

== Career ==
Regan started boxing as a teenager under trainer Dai Gardner, who remained his trainer throughout his career. As an amateur boxer, he won several titles and competed in the 1986 Commonwealth Games.

He made his professional debut on 19 August 1989, with a points draw against Eric George in Cardiff, Wales. His first title came on 28 May 1991, when he scored a twelve-round points decision over Joe Kelly to win the vacant British flyweight title. He lost the title in his first defence against Francis Ampofo on 3 September 1991, via eleventh round technical knockout (TKO), suffering the first loss of his professional career. Regan regained the British flyweight title in a rematch against Ampofo 3 months later on 17 December 1991, winning by twelve round points decision.

On 14 November 1992, Regan defeated European champion Salvatore Fanni, capturing the EBU European flyweight title via unanimous decision (117–116, 117–115, 117–114).

On 17 June 1995, Regan made his first attempt at a world championship by challenging Alberto Jiménez for his WBO flyweight title at the National Ice Rink in Cardiff, Wales, losing via ninth round stoppage. On 16 December 1995, Regan fought Ferid Ben Jeddou at the Welsh Institute of Sport in Cardiff, Wales, winning by second round knockout to capture the IBF interim flyweight title. Regan made a second attempt at a world championship on 26 April 1996, challenging two-weight world champion Daniel Jiménez for his WBO bantamweight title, again at the Welsh Institute of Sport in Cardiff. Regan won by unanimous decision (116–113, 116–111, 115–112), capturing the WBO title in what would be his final fight.

Regan's boxing career ended shortly after the WBO fight as he was diagnosed with glandular fever. Although he attempted to mount a comeback in 1998, he failed a brain scan and was forced to retire. He retired from boxing with a 17–2–3 record.

== Professional boxing record ==
22 fights	17 wins	2 losses
By knockout	7	2
By decision	10	0
Draws	3	

No.	Result	Record	Opponent	Type	Round, time	Date	Location	Notes
22	Win	17–2–3	(Puerto Rico) Daniel Jiménez	UD	12	26 Apr 1996	(United Kingdom) Welsh Institute of Sport, Cardiff, Wales	Won WBO bantamweight title
21	Win	16–2–3	(Tunisia) Ferid Ben Jeddou	KO	2 (12)	16 Dec 1995	(United Kingdom) Welsh Institute of Sport, Cardiff, Wales	Won IBF interim flyweight title
20	Loss	15–2–3	(Mexico) Alberto Jiménez	RTD	9 (12)	17 Jun 1995	(United Kingdom) National Ice Rink, Cardiff, Wales	For WBO flyweight title
19	Win	15–1–3	(Italy) Luigi Camputaro	SD	12	19 Nov 1994	(United Kingdom) National Ice Rink, Cardiff, Wales	Retained EBU European flyweight title
18	Win	14–1–3	(United Kingdom) Shaun Norman	TKO	2 (8)	1 Oct 1994	(United Kingdom) National Ice Rink, Cardiff, Wales	
17	Win	13–1–3	(Colombia) Mauricio Bernal	PTS	8	12 Mar 1994	(United Kingdom) National Ice Rink, Cardiff, Wales	
16	Win	12–1–3	(Italy) Michele Poddighe	PTS	10	29 Jan 1994	(United Kingdom) National Ice Rink, Cardiff, Wales	
15	Win	11–1–3	(Argentina) Adrian Cristian Ochoa	PTS	10	26 Jun 1993	(United Kingdom) Olympia, London, England	
14	Win	10–1–3	(United Kingdom) Danny Porter	TKO	3 (12)	30 Mar 1993	(United Kingdom) Welsh Institute of Sport, Cardiff, Wales	Retain EBU European flyweight title
13	Win	9–1–3	(United Kingdom) Salvatore Fanni	UD	12	14 Nov 1992	(United Kingdom) National Ice Rink, Cardiff, Wales	Won EBU European flyweight title
12	Win	8–1–3	(United Kingdom) James Drummond	TKO	9 (12)	19 May 1992	(United Kingdom) National Ice Rink, Cardiff, Wales	Retained British flyweight title
11	Win	7–1–3	(Mexico) Juan Bautista Blanco	KO	2 (10)	11 Feb 1992	(United Kingdom) National Sports Centre, Cardiff, Wales	
10	Win	6–1–3	(United Kingdom) Francis Ampofo	PTS	12	12 Dec 1991	(United Kingdom) National Ice Rink, Cardiff, Wales	Won British flyweight title
9	Loss	5–1–3	(United Kingdom) Francis Ampofo	TKO	11 (12)	3 Sep 1991	(United Kingdom) National Sports Centre, Cardiff, Wales	Lost British flyweight title
8	Win	5–0–3	(United Kingdom) Joe Kelly	PTS	12	28 May 1991	(United Kingdom) National Sports Centre, Cardiff, Wales	Won vacant British flyweight title
7	Win	4–0–3	(United Kingdom) Kevin Jenkins	PTS	10	12 Feb 1991	(United Kingdom) National Sports Centre, Cardiff, Wales	Won vacant BBBofC Welsh Area flyweight title
6	Draw	3–0–3	(Italy) Michele Poddighe	PTS	6	21 Dec 1990	(Italy) Sassari, Sardinia	
5	Win	3–0–2	(United Kingdom) Ricky Beard	TKO	6 (6)	19 Nov 1990	(United Kingdom) Star Leisure Centre, Cardiff, Wales	
4	Draw	2–0–2	(United Kingdom) Dave McNally	PTS	6	20 Jun 1990	(United Kingdom) Festival Hall, Essex, England	
3	Win	2–0–1	(United Kingdom) Kevin Downer	TKO	4 (6)	26 Apr 1990	(United Kingdom) Rhydycar Leisure Centre, Merthyr Tydfil, Wales	
2	Win	1–0–1	(United Kingdom) Francis Ampofo	PTS	6	6 Mar 1990	(United Kingdom) York Hall, London, England	
1	Draw	0–0–1	(United Kingdom) Eric George	PTS	6	19 Aug 1989	(United Kingdom) Splott Market, Cardif, Wales	

== See also ==
- List of Welsh boxing world champions
- List of British flyweight boxing champions
- List of European Boxing Union flyweight champions
- List of bantamweight boxing champions

Achievements
New title	IBF flyweight champion Interim Title; 16 December 1995 – 1996; Vacated	Vacant
Preceded by Daniel Jiménez	WBO bantamweight champion 26 April 1996 – 18 July 1997; Vacated	Succeeded by Jorge Eliécer Julio promoted from interim status
