= Ady Lewis =

British former professional boxer (born 1975)

Personal information
- Nickname: Mighty Atom
- Nationality: British
- Born: Adrian Lewis; 31 May 1975 (age 51) Bury, England
- Height: 4 ft 10 in (1.47 m)
- Weight: Flyweight; Bantamweight

Boxing career

Boxing record
- Total fights: 25
- Wins: 19
- Win by KO: 12
- Losses: 5
- Draws: 1

Adrian "Ady" Lewis (born 31 May 1975) is a British former professional boxer who competed from 1994 to 2001. He challenged once for the IBO bantamweight title in 2001. At regional level, he held the British and Commonwealth flyweight titles in 1997, and the British and Commonwealth bantamweight titles in 2000.

== Career ==
Born in Bury, Lewis fought out of the Bury ABC as an amateur and was runner-up in the ABA Junior Class-B bantamweight championship against Spencer Oliver.

He began his professional career in 1994. Standing 4 ft 10in tall and weighing 8 stones, Lewis was the smallest British professional boxer at the time. After winning his first ten fights he took his first title when he beat Louis Veitch on points in December 1996 to become BBBofC Central Area flyweight champion.

In January 1997 he beat Keith Knox to take the vacant British flyweight title, defending it successfully four months later against Mark Reynolds. In his second defence in September 1997, Peter Culshaw's Commonwealth title was also at stake; Lewis stopped Culshaw in the eighth round to retain his British title and become commonwealth champion.

In November 1997 Lewis challenged for David Guerault's EBU European flyweight title in Manchester. Guerault stopped Lewis in the fourth round, inflicting Lewis' first defeat as a professional.

Lewis subsequently moved up to bantamweight, and in June 1999 fought Noel Wilders in a final eliminator for the British title, losing after being stopped in the sixth round. In April 2000 he faced Francis Ampofo for the vacant British and commonwealth titles at the York Hall, winning both titles by unanimous decision. He defended both titles in September 2000, but lost to Tommy Waite after a cut forced the fight to be stopped. In February 2001 he challenged Nicky Booth for both titles but was stopped in the seventh round.

Lewis' final fight was against Jose Sanjuanelo in October 2001 for the IBO bantamweight title, losing after being stopped in the second round.

Lewis went on to run the Dynamics gym in Radcliffe.
