= List of Danish world boxing champions =

This is a list of Danish boxing world champions who have won major world titles from the "Big four" governing bodies in professional boxing namely the World Boxing Association (WBA), World Boxing Council (WBC), International Boxing Federation (IBF) and World Boxing Organization (WBO).

== List of men's professional boxing world champions ==
The following is a list of Danish boxing champions who have held titles from one or more of the "Big Four" organizations (WBA, WBC, IBF, WBO) and The Ring.

WBA has four recognized world champions, Super, Undisputed, Unified and Regular. The highest tier title is considered the primary champion of the division. Only boxers who are in the primary champion lineage are listed.

The ranking of WBA's primary champions are as follows:

- Super
- Undisputed
- Unified
- Regular

Other former international/national-world boxing commissions and organizations from the beginning of boxing are also included here:

- New York State Athletic Commission (NYSAC)
- National Boxing Association (NBA) - changed its name to World Boxing Association (WBA) in 1962

| | Current world champion |
| | Inducted into the International Boxing Hall of Fame |
| | World titles from world and The Ring |
| | WBA Regular champion |
| ‡ | denotes that both the WBA Super and Unified is vacant/vacated during his title reign. |

| No. | Name | Titles | Date | Opponent | Result | Defenses |
|---|---|---|---|---|---|---|
| 1 | Johnny Bredahl | WBO Super flyweight (112) | Sep 4, 1992 | (Mexico) José Quirino | UD 12/12 | 3 |
| 1 | Johnny Bredahl | WBA Bantamweight (118) | Apr 19, 2002 | (Venezuela) Eidy Moya | KO 9/12 | 3 |
| 2 | Gert Bo Jacobsen | WBO Welterweight (147) | Feb 12, 1993 | (United States) Manning Galloway | UD 12/12 | 0 |
| 3 | Mikkel Kessler | WBA Super middleweight (168) | Nov 12, 2004 | (Puerto Rico) Manny Siaca | RTD 7/12 | 0 |
| 3 | Mikkel Kessler | WBA Super middleweight (168) | Unified; Oct 14, 2006 | (Germany) Markus Beyer | KO 3/12 | Unified; 1 |
| 3 | Mikkel Kessler | WBC Super middleweight (168) | Oct 14, 2006 | (Germany) Markus Beyer | KO 3/12 | 1 |
| 3 | Mikkel Kessler | WBA (Regular) Super middleweight (168) – (2) | Regular; Jun 21, 2008 | (Germany) Dimitri Sartison | KO 12/12 | Regular; 0 |
| 3 | Mikkel Kessler | WBA (Regular) Super middleweight (168) – (2) | Regular^{‡} Oct 3, 2008 | Primary champion vacant | | Regular^{‡} 2 |
| 3 | Mikkel Kessler | WBA (Regular) Super middleweight (168) – (2) | Super; Oct 21, 2009 | Promoted | | Super; 0 |
| 3 | Mikkel Kessler | WBC Super middleweight (168) – (2) | Apr 24, 2010 | (United Kingdom) Carl Froch | UD 12/12 | 0 |

=== Note ===
- Interim titles are not included unless they get promoted to the official champion.
- For WBA champions, only champions in the WBA primary lineage are listed.

=== List of WBA secondary champions ===
| No. | Name | Titles | Reign period | Opponent | Result | Defenses | Primary champion/s during reign |
|---|---|---|---|---|---|---|---|
| 1 | Mikkel Kessler | WBA (Regular) Super middleweight (168) | Jun 21, 2008 – Oct 3, 2008; Becomes primary champion due to vacancy of the title. | (Germany) Dimitri Sartison | KO 12/12 | 0 | |
| 1 | Mikkel Kessler | WBA (Regular) Super middleweight (168) | Jun 21, 2008 – Oct 3, 2008; Becomes primary champion due to vacancy of the title. | (Germany) Dimitri Sartison | KO 12/12 | 0 | (United Kingdom) Joe Calzaghe; Nov 4, 2007 – Oct 3, 2008 |
| 2 | Mikkel Kessler (2) | WBA (Regular) Super middleweight (168) – (2) | Dec 8, 2012 – May 25, 2013 | (United Kingdom) Brian Magee | TKO 3/12 | 0 | |
| 2 | Mikkel Kessler (2) | WBA (Regular) Super middleweight (168) – (2) | Dec 8, 2012 – May 25, 2013 | (United Kingdom) Brian Magee | TKO 3/12 | 0 | (United States) Andre Ward; Nov 21, 2009 – Kessler lost the title to Carl Froch while Ward was still the primary champion. |

== See also ==
- List of WBA world champions
- List of WBC world champions
- List of IBF world champions
- List of WBO world champions
- List of The Ring world champions
- List of undisputed boxing champions
