= Alberto Jiménez =

Alberto Jiménez may refer to:

- Alberto Jiménez-Becerril (1960-1998), Spanish politician
- Alberto Jiménez (boxer) (born 1969), Mexican boxer
- Alberto Jiménez (footballer) (born 1992), Spanish footballer
