= Johnny Bredahl =

Danish boxer

Personal information
- Born: Johnny Bredahl Johansen; 27 August 1968 (age 58) Copenhagen, Denmark
- Height: 5 ft 8 in (173 cm)
- Weight: Super-flyweight; Bantamweight

Boxing career
- Stance: Orthodox

Boxing record
- Total fights: 58
- Wins: 56
- Win by KO: 26
- Losses: 2
Medal record
Representing Denmark
Men's Boxing
European Amateur Championships
| Bronze medal – third place | 1987 Turin | Flyweight |

Johnny Bredahl Johansen (born 27 August 1968), known professionally as Johnny Bredahl or Johny Wahid Johansen, is a Danish former professional boxer who competed between 1989 and 2006. He is a world champion in two weight classes, having held the World Boxing Organization (WBO) super-flyweight title from 1992 to 1994 and the World Boxing Association (WBA) bantamweight title from 2002 to 2004. He is the younger brother of former super featherweight world champion of boxing, Jimmi Bredahl.

== Amateur career ==
Bredahl boxed as an amateur and represented Denmark in the 1988 Summer Olympics in Seoul, South Korea before turning professional.

== 1988 Olympic results ==
Below is the record of Johnny Bedahl, a Danish flyweight boxer who competed at the 1988 Seoul Olympics:

- Round of 64: lost to Hamed Halbouni (Syria) referee stopped contest in the second round

== Professional career ==
In December 1988, Bredahl turn professional winning his first fight at the Sheraton Hotel in Copenhagen, when Bredahl beat England's Gordon Stobie with a points decision over six rounds. Bredahl won seven of his first eight fights in a similar fashion.

Bredahl won the vacant EBU bantamweight title, in March 1992 with a seven-round knockout win over Scotland's Donnie Hood. Later that year, Bredahl won his first world title belt, the WBO super-flyweight title with a win over Jose Quirino.

Bredahl first opportunity to fight for a recognised world title belt came in December 1995, when he challenged Wayne McCullough for his WBC bantamweight title. However, Bredahl suffered the first defeat on his career when McCullough beat Bredahl by a knockout in the seventh round to retain his title.

Bredahl also won minor world titles from the IBO, WBU, and IBC.

In April 2002, he once again became a world champion by beating Eidy Moya to win the WBA bantamweight title. He went on to successfully defend the title 3 times and announced his retirement in October 2004.

Bredahl briefly came back and fought Alexander Fedorov. However, he immediately went back to retirement after the fight.

== Professional boxing record ==
| 58 fights | 56 wins | 2 losses |
|---|---|---|
| By knockout | 26 | 1 |
| By decision | 28 | 1 |
| By disqualification | 2 | 0 |

| No. | Result | Record | Opponent | Type | Round, time | Date | Location | Notes |
|---|---|---|---|---|---|---|---|---|
| 58 | Win | 56–2 | Alexander Fedorov | DQ | 7 (12), 0:43 | 30 Mar 2006 | K.B. Hallen, Copenhagen, Denmark | Won vacant WBA and WBO Inter-Continental bantamweight titles; Fedorov was disqualificated after repeatedly throwing illegal strikes. |
| 57 | Win | 55–2 | Nobuaki Naka | UD | 12 | 13 Mar 2004 | Brøndbyhallen, Brøndby, Denmark | Retained WBA bantamweight title |
| 56 | Win | 54–2 | David Guerault | UD | 12 | 24 Oct 2003 | K.B. Hallen, Copenhagen, Denmark | Retained WBA bantamweight title |
| 55 | Win | 53–2 | Leo Gamez | UD | 12 | 8 Nov 2002 | Falconer Centeret, Frederiksberg, Denmark | Retained WBA and IBC bantamweight titles |
| 54 | Win | 52–2 | Eidy Moya | KO | 9 (12), 2:40 | 19 Apr 2002 | Falconer Centeret, Frederiksberg, Denmark | Won WBA bantamweight title |
| 53 | Win | 51–2 | Evangelio Perez | UD | 6 | 13 Oct 2001 | Parken Stadium, Copenhagen, Denmark | |
| 52 | Win | 50–2 | Andres Martinez | KO | 3 (8), 2:59 | 16 Jun 2001 | Brøndbyhallen, Brøndby, Denmark | |
| 51 | Win | 49–2 | Joel Junio | UD | 12 | 9 Mar 2001 | K.B. Hallen, Copenhagen, Denmark | Retained WBA Inter-Continental and IBC bantamweight titles |
| 50 | Win | 48–2 | Alexandre Da Silva | KO | 5 (12) | 1 Dec 2000 | Viborg Stadionhal, Viborg, Denmark | Retained WBA Inter-Continental and IBC bantamweight titles |
| 49 | Win | 47–2 | Leonardo Gutierrez | PTS | 8 | 3 Nov 2000 | K.B. Hallen, Copenhagen, Denmark | |
| 48 | Win | 46–2 | Roberto Lopez | UD | 12 | 1 Sep 2000 | Kolding-Hallen, Kolding, Denmark | Won WBA Inter-Continental bantamweight title |
| 47 | Loss | 45–2 | Paulie Ayala | MD | 12 | 4 Mar 2000 | Mandalay Bay Resort & Casino, Las Vegas, Nevada, US | For WBA bantamweight title |
| 46 | Win | 45–1 | Paul Lloyd | TKO | 1 (12) | 29 Oct 1999 | K.B. Hallen, Copenhagen, Denmark | Retained IBC and EBU bantamweight titles |
| 45 | Win | 44–1 | Sandile Sobandla | UD | 8 | 3 Sep 1999 | K.B. Hallen, Copenhagen, Denmark | |
| 44 | Win | 43–1 | Len Martinez | TKO | 2 (8) | 18 Jun 1999 | Idraettens Hus, Vejle, Denmark | |
| 43 | Win | 42–1 | Kamel Guerfi | KO | 6 (12) | 4 May 1999 | Cirkusbygningen, Copenhagen, Denmark | Won vacant IBC and EBU bantamweight titles |
| 42 | Win | 41–1 | Nelson Ramon Medina | KO | 1 (8) | 19 Mar 1999 | Falconer Centeret, Frederiksberg, Denmark | |
| 41 | Win | 40–1 | Xolani Ndleleni | KO | 3 (8) | 27 Nov 1998 | Vejlby-Risskov Hallen, Aarhus, Denmark | |
| 40 | Win | 39–1 | Gerardo Garcia | KO | 2 (8) | 16 Oct 1998 | Aalborghallen, Aalborg, Denmark | |
| 39 | Win | 38–1 | Patrick Quka | TKO | 5 (12) | 5 Jun 1998 | K.B. Hallen, Copenhagen, Denmark | Won WBU bantamweight title |
| 38 | Win | 37–1 | Alexander Yagupov | UD | 12 | 3 Apr 1998 | Holbæk Stadionhal, Holbæk, Denmark | Retained IBO and EBU bantamweight titles |
| 37 | Win | 36–1 | Cruz Carbajal | UD | 8 | 13 Feb 1998 | Falconer Centeret, Frederiksberg, Denmark | |
| 36 | Win | 35–1 | Willy Salazar | UD | 8 | 14 Nov 1997 | K.B. Hallen, Copenhagen, Denmark | |
| 35 | Win | 34–1 | Javier Campanario | KO | 5 (12) | 3 Oct 1997 | Østre Gasværk Teater, Copenhagen, Denmark | Retained IBO and EBU bantamweight titles |
| 34 | Win | 33–1 | Igor Gerasimov | KO | 5 (12) | 13 Jun 1997 | Antvorskovhallen, Slagelse, Denmark | Retained IBO bantamweight title |
| 33 | Win | 32–1 | Laureano Ramírez | KO | 8 (12) | 2 May 1997 | Randers Hallen, Randers, Denmark | Retained IBO bantamweight title |
| 32 | Win | 31–1 | Drew Docherty | TKO | 3 (12), 2:36 | 14 Mar 1997 | Odense Sports Park, Odense, Denmark | Retained EBU bantamweight title |
| 31 | Win | 30–1 | Harald Geier | TKO | 5 (12) | 30 Nov 1996 | Nova Arena, Wiener Neustadt, Austria | Retained IBO and EBU bantamweight titles |
| 30 | Win | 29–1 | Alexander Yagupov | UD | 12 | 31 May 1996 | K.B. Hallen, Copenhagen, Denmark | Retained IBO bantamweight title; Won vacant EBU bantamweight title |
| 29 | Win | 28–1 | Rolando Pascua | KO | 1 (12) | 29 Mar 1996 | Brøndbyhallen, Brøndby, Denmark | Retained IBO bantamweight title |
| 28 | Win | 27–1 | Efrain Pintor | RTD | 2 (12), 3:00 | 16 Feb 1996 | Lillebæltshallen, Middelfart, Denmark | Won inaugural IBO bantamweight title |
| 27 | Loss | 26–1 | Wayne McCullough | TKO | 8 (12), 1:55 | 2 Dec 1995 | King's Hall, Belfast, Northern Ireland | For WBC bantamweight title |
| 26 | Win | 26–0 | Jeff Love | KO | 1 (8), 0:30 | 20 Oct 1995 | Cirkusbygningen, Copenhagen, Denmark | |
| 25 | Win | 25–0 | Kino Rodriguez | PTS | 8 | 8 Sep 1995 | Aalborghallen, Aalborg, Denmark | |
| 24 | Win | 24–0 | Chris Gomez | UD | 8 | 9 Jun 1995 | Bramdrupdam Hallerne, Kolding, Denmark | |
| 23 | Win | 23–0 | Kenny Mitchell | PTS | 8 | 17 Mar 1995 | K.B. Hallen, Copenhagen, Denmark | |
| 22 | Win | 22–0 | Conn McMullen | PTS | 8 | 7 Oct 1994 | K.B. Hallen, Copenhagen, Denmark | |
| 21 | Win | 21–0 | Adey Benton | PTS | 8 | 16 Sep 1994 | Aalborghallen, Aalborg, Denmark | |
| 20 | Win | 20–0 | Eduardo Nazario | UD | 12 | 25 Mar 1994 | Aakirkeby Hallerne, Aakirkeby, Denmark | Retained WBO super-flyweight title |
| 19 | Win | 19–0 | Eduardo Nazario | DQ | 4 (12), 2:54 | 29 Oct 1993 | Storebaelthallen, Korsør, Denmark | Retained WBO super-flyweight title |
| 18 | Win | 18–0 | Antonio Morales | KO | 3 (8) | 17 Sep 1993 | Cirkusbygningen, Copenhagen, Denmark | |
| 17 | Win | 17–0 | Rafael Caban | UD | 12 | 26 Mar 1993 | Cirkusbygningen, Copenhagen, Denmark | Retained WBO super-flyweight title |
| 16 | Win | 16–0 | Jose De Jesus | KO | 1 (8) | 12 Feb 1993 | Randers Hallen, Randers, Denmark | |
| 15 | Win | 15–0 | José Quirino | UD | 12 | 4 Sep 1992 | Parken Stadium, Copenhagen, Denmark | Won WBO super-flyweight title |
| 14 | Win | 14–0 | Donnie Hood | TKO | 7 (12) | 14 Mar 1992 | Scandinavia Hotel, Copenhagen, Denmark | Won vacant EBU bantamweight title |
| 13 | Win | 13–0 | Lionel Jean | TKO | 7 (8) | 6 Dec 1991 | Idraetshuset, Copenhagen, Denmark | |
| 12 | Win | 12–0 | Antonio Picardi | PTS | 8 | 17 May 1991 | K.B. Hallen, Copenhagen, Denmark | |
| 11 | Win | 11–0 | Antti Juntumaa | KO | 3 (10) | 15 Feb 1991 | Randers Hallen, Randers, Denmark | Won Scandinavian super-flyweight title |
| 10 | Win | 10–0 | Benito Martinez | KO | 5 (8) | 8 Dec 1990 | Aalborghallen, Aalborg, Denmark | |
| 9 | Win | 9–0 | Andrea Mannai | KO | 5 (6) | 19 Oct 1990 | Skive Hallerne, Skive, Denmark | |
| 8 | Win | 8–0 | Peter Buckley | PTS | 6 | 17 May 1990 | Nordjysk Messecenter, Aars, Denmark | |
| 7 | Win | 7–0 | Jamie McBride | RTD | 5 (6), 3:00 | 3 May 1990 | Greve Hallen, Greve Strand, Denmark | |
| 6 | Win | 6–0 | Miguel Matthews | PTS | 6 | 3 Dec 1989 | Scandinavia Hotel, Copenhagen, Denmark | |
| 5 | Win | 5–0 | Gordon Shaw | PTS | 6 | 9 Jun 1989 | Tivoli Friheden, Aarhus, Denmark | |
| 4 | Win | 4–0 | Francisco Garcia | PTS | 6 | 17 Apr 1989 | Skive Hallerne, Skive, Denmark | |
| 3 | Win | 3–0 | Joe Mullen | PTS | 6 | 17 Mar 1989 | Brædstrup Kro, Brædstrup, Denmark | |
| 2 | Win | 2–0 | Chris Clarkson | PTS | 6 | 16 Feb 1989 | Lorry, Copenhagen, Denmark | |
| 1 | Win | 1–0 | Gordon Stobie | PTS | 6 | 8 Dec 1988 | Hotel Sheraton, Copenhagen, Denmark | |

== Titles in boxing ==
=== Major world titles ===
- WBO super-flyweight champion (115 lbs)
- WBA bantamweight champion (118 lbs)

=== Minor world titles ===
- IBO bantamweight champion (118 lbs)
- WBU bantamweight champion (118 lbs)
- IBC bantamweight champion (118 lbs)

=== Regional/International titles ===
- Scandinavian super-flyweight champion (115 lbs)
- EBU bantamweight champion (118 lbs) (3x)
- WBA Inter-Continental bantamweight champion (118 lbs) (2x)
- WBO Inter-Continental bantamweight champion (118 lbs)

== See also ==
- List of super-flyweight boxing champions
- List of bantamweight boxing champions
- List of Danish world boxing champions

Sporting positions
Minor world boxing titles
| Inaugural Champion | IBO bantamweight champion February 16, 1996 - 1998; Vacates | Vacant Title next held by Noel Wilders |
Major world boxing titles
| Preceded by José Quirino | WBO super-flyweight champion September 4, 1992 - July 16, 1994; Stripped | Vacant Title next held by Johnny Tapia |
| Preceded by Eidy Moya | WBA bantamweight champion April 19, 2002 - October 13, 2004; Retires | Vacant Title next held by Volodymyr Sydorenko |
