= Noel Wilders =

British former professional boxer (born 1975)

Personal information
- Nationality: British
- Born: 4 January 1975 (age 51) Castleford, England
- Height: 5 ft 5 in (165 cm)
- Weight: Bantamweight

Boxing career
- Stance: Southpaw

Boxing record
- Total fights: 29
- Wins: 24
- Win by KO: 7
- Losses: 4
- Draws: 1

Noel Wilders (born 4 January 1975) is a British former professional boxer who competed from 1996 to 2006. He held the IBO bantamweight title in 2000 and challenged once for the same title in 2004. At regional level, he held the British bantamweight title from 1999 to 2000 and the EBU European bantamweight title from 2003.

== Career ==
Born in Castleford, Yorkshire, Wilders first had success as an amateur, winning the ABA bantamweight title in 1995.

He made his professional debut in March 1996 with a fourth round stoppage of Neil Parry. In February 1998 he beat Marcus Duncan to win the vacant BBBofC Central Area bantamweight title.

After beating Ady Lewis in a final eliminator he beat Francis Ampofo on points in October 1999 to take the vacant British title. He made a successful defence in January 2000 against Steve Williams.

In March 2000 he faced Kamel Guerfi for the vacant IBO World bantamweight title, winning on points. He successfully defended the title four months later against Paul Lloyd. Later that year he was prevented from boxing and stripped of his titles after a problem with a routine brain scan.

He regained his licence and after splitting from promoter Frank Warren after a string of cancelled fights, in January 2003 beat Fabien Guillerme in Nice to win the vacant European bantamweight title. Two months later he defended the title against Frédéric Patrac, the fight ending in a technical draw after an accidental clash of heads left Wilders badly cut. In June 2003 he made a second defence against David Guerault. Guerault knocked him out in the seventh round, inflicting the first defeat of Wilders' career.

In August 2004 Wilders attempted to regain the IBO World title when he challenged the unbeaten Silence Mabuza in Temba, South Africa; Mabuza knocked him out in the fifth round.

Wilders returned in May 2005 at super bantamweight when he was beaten by Esham Pickering, and in October was due to face Bernard Dunne for the IBC super bantamweight title, but had to withdraw. He decided to retire but reversed his decision and faced Dunne in what was his final fight in January 2006, Dunne stopping him in the sixth round.
