= Julio César Borboa =

Mexican boxer (born 1969)

Personal information
- Nickname: Rocky Navajo
- Born: Julio César Borboa García; August 12, 1969 (age 56) Guaymas, Sonora, Mexico
- Height: 5 ft 4 in (163 cm)
- Weight: Super flyweight

Boxing career
- Reach: 64 1/2 in (164 cm)
- Stance: Orthodox

Boxing record
- Total fights: 30
- Wins: 24
- Win by KO: 22
- Losses: 6

Julio César Borboa García (born 12 August 1969) is a Mexican former professional boxer. He the IBF Super Flyweight Champion.

== Professional career ==
In November 1992, Borboa beat an undefeated and future WBO world Bantamweight Champion, African Alfred Kotey to earn his first title shot.

=== IBF Super Flyweight Championship ===
On May 31, 1997 Julio César won the IBF Super Flyweight Championship by upsetting the undefeated Robert Quiroga by T.K.O. in the twelfth round. He defended the title five times including against compatriot Jorge Luis Roman. & South African Jaji Sibali.

== Professional boxing record ==
30 fights	24 wins	6 losses
By knockout	22	2
By decision	2	4

No.	Result	Record	Opponent	Type	Round, time	Date	Location	Notes
30	Loss	24–6	Harold Grey	SD	12 (12)	1995-06-24	Coliseo Bernardo Caraballo, Cartagena, Colombia	For IBF super-flyweight title
29	Win	24–5	Ventura Mendivil	KO	2 (10)	1995-04-06	Olympic Auditorium, Los Angeles, California, U.S.	
28	Loss	23–5	Harold Grey	SD	12 (12)	1994-08-29	Great Western Forum, Inglewood, California, U.S.	Lost IBF super-flyweight title
27	Win	23–4	Jaji Sibali	TKO	9 (12)	1994-05-21	Carousel Casino, Hammanskraal, South Africa	Retained IBF super-flyweight title
26	Win	22–4	Jorge Luis Roman	TKO	4 (12)	1994-04-25	Great Western Forum, Inglewood, California, U.S.	Retained IBF super-flyweight title
25	Win	21–4	Rolando Pascua	TKO	5 (12)	1993-11-26	Coliseo, Hermosillo, Mexico	Retained IBF super-flyweight title
24	Win	20–4	Carlos Mercado	KO	3 (12)	1993-08-21	Raceway Park, Kalispell, Montana, U.S.	Retained IBF super-flyweight title
23	Win	19–4	Joel Luna Zárate	UD	12 (12)	1993-05-22	Toreo de Cuatro Caminos, Naucalpan, Mexico	Retained IBF super-flyweight title
22	Win	18–4	Robert Quiroga	TKO	12 (12)	1993-01-16	Freeman Coliseum, San Antonio, Texas, U.S.	Won IBF super-flyweight title
21	Win	17–4	Alfred Kotey	SD	10 (10)	1992-11-17	The Blue Horizon, Philadelphia, Pennsylvania, U.S.	
20	Win	16–4	Elidio Dominguez	KO	7 (?)	1992-09-02	Bakersfield, California, U.S.	
19	Loss	15–4	Joel Díaz	PTS	6 (6)	1992-08-18	Red Lion Inn & Casino, Elko, Nevada, U.S.	
18	Win	15–3	Elidio Dominguez	RTD	6 (8)	1991-10-25	Hacienda Hotel, Paradise, Nevada, U.S.	
17	Loss	14–3	Francis Vivish	PTS	6 (6)	1991-09-07	Fiscalini Field, San Bernardino, California, U.S.	
16	Loss	14–2	Cuauhtémoc Gomez	TKO	3 (?)	1990-07-20	Hermosillo, Mexico	
15	Win	14–1	Jesus Ruvalcava	KO	7 (?)	1990-03-03	Guaymas, Mexico	
14	Win	13–1	Jose Luis Tebaqui	KO	2 (?)	1990-02-02	Hermosillo, Mexico	
13	Win	12–1	Antonio Contreras	KO	5 (?)	1990-01-01	Agua Prieta, Mexico	
12	Win	11–1	Modesto Loza	KO	5 (?)	1989-11-24	Hermosillo, Mexico	
11	Loss	10–1	Pablo Valenzuela	TKO	6 (?)	1989-09-02	Guaymas, Mexico	
10	Win	10–0	Jose Luis Tebaqui	KO	3 (?)	1989-06-06	Agua Prieta, Mexico	
9	Win	9–0	Carlos Rivas	KO	4 (?)	1989-05-05	Caborca, Mexico	
8	Win	8–0	Juan Izaguirre	KO	2 (?)	1989-04-04	Los Mochis, Mexico	
7	Win	7–0	Jorge Torres	KO	1 (?)	1989-03-03	Lienzo Charro, Los Mochis, Mexico	
6	Win	6–0	Carlos Rivas	TKO	2 (?)	1989-02-03	Caborca, Mexico	
5	Win	5–0	Oscar Falcon	KO	1 (?)	1989-01-01	Mexico	
4	Win	4–0	Salvador Lucero	KO	2 (?)	1988-07-07	Mexico	
3	Win	3–0	Francisco Javier Cadena	KO	2 (?)	1988-05-09	Tijuana, Mexico	
2	Win	2–0	Armando Torres	KO	1 (?)	1988-03-03	Hermosillo, Mexico	
1	Win	1–0	Ray Armenta	KO	1 (?)	1988-02-04	Culiacán, Mexico	

== See also ==
- List of Mexican boxing world champions
- List of world super-flyweight boxing champions

Sporting positions
World boxing titles
Preceded by Robert Quiroga	IBF super-flyweight champion January 16, 1993 – August 29, 1994	Succeeded by Harold Grey
