= Akeem Anifowoshe =

Nigerian boxer

- Born: 11 September 1968
- Died: 1 December 1994 (aged 26)
- Occupation: Boxer

Akeem Anifowoshe(11 September 1968 – 1 December 1994), known as "Kid" Akeem, was a Nigerian super-flyweight professional boxer.

He is best known for his performance in Ring Magazine's 1991 Fight of the Year, which he lost to Robert Quiroga by a close but bruising unanimous decision.

He was challenging Quiroga for his International Boxing Federation super-flyweight title. Shortly after the decision was announced, Anifowoshe collapsed in the ring and was rushed to emergency surgery to remove a bloodclot from his brain.

After being injured in the Quiroga fight, Anifowoshe was not allowed to fight in the United States again. There are reports that he turned to drug trafficking and was deported back to Nigeria, where he picked up boxing again after a while. Reports vary on exactly how he died: some say he had boxed in an ill-advised professional match in Nigeria and collapsed in the shower afterward, some say he collapsed after a training session.

It is known that his death was attributed to the brain injury sustained in his fight with Quiroga. Called by trainer Miguel Diaz the fighter with the most natural talent he ever trained and a recipient of an honorable mention in the Ring's 1987 "Prospect of the Year" selections, Anifowoshe has a final record of 23 wins against only 1 defeat. A hard puncher, he won 18 of his professional fights by knockout.
