= José Luis Bueno =

Mexican boxer

Personal information
- Born: 8 December 1969 (age 56) Nezahualcóyotl, México, Mexico
- Height: 5 ft 4 1/2 in (164 cm)
- Weight: Super Bantamweight; Bantamweight; Super Flyweight

Boxing career
- Reach: 69 in (175 cm)
- Stance: Orthodox

Boxing record
- Total fights: 41
- Wins: 30
- Win by KO: 21
- Losses: 9
- Draws: 2
- No contests: 0

José Luis Bueno (born 8 December 1969) is a Mexican former professional boxer and former WBC and Lineal Super Flyweight Champion. Bueno was also the trainer of former WBC Light Flyweight Champion, Adrián Hernández.

== Professional career ==
In June 1987, José began his professional career losing to fellow debutant Miguel Banda. In 1991 he beat title contender Armando Salazar to win the WBC Continental Americas Super Flyweight title.

=== WBC Super Flyweight Championship ===
On November 13, 1993 Bueno upset Sung-Kil Moon to win the WBC and Lineal Super Flyweight title. This bout was held in Indoor Gymnasium, Pohang City, South Korea. He lost the title in a controversial decision to Hiroshi Kawashima in Japan.

=== WBC Bantamweight Championship ===
José lost a split decision to Wayne McCullough in The Point, Dublin, Ireland.

=== WBC Super Bantamweight Championship ===
Bueno's last bout was against four division World Champion, Erik Morales. He retired after his defeat to Morales in 1998.

== See also ==
- List of super-flyweight boxing champions
- List of Mexican boxing world champions

Achievements
| Preceded by Moon Sung-kil | WBC super flyweight champion November 13, 1993 – May 4, 1994 | Succeeded by Hiroshi Kawashima |
| Preceded by Moon Sung-kil | Lineal super-flyweight champion November 13, 1993 – May 4, 1994 | Succeeded by Hiroshi Kawashima |
