= Carlos Gabriel Salazar =

Argentine boxer

Carlos Salazar
Personal information
- Born: Carlos Gabriel Salazar; 5 September 1964 (age 62) Sáenz Peña, Argentina
- Height: 5 ft 4 in (163 cm)
- Weight: Flyweight; Super flyweight

Boxing career
- Reach: 65 1/2 in (166 cm)
- Stance: Southpaw

Boxing record
- Total fights: 58
- Wins: 47
- Win by KO: 18
- Losses: 8
- Draws: 3

Carlos Gabriel Salazar (born 5 September 1964) is an Argentine former professional boxer who competed from 1985 to 1998. He is a world champion in two weight classes, having held the International Boxing Federation (IBF) super flyweight title from 1995 to 1996, and the World Boxing Organization (WBO) flyweight title from 1996 to 1998.

== Professional career ==
As a professional he had 58 fights (47–3–8), from 1985 to 1998. He campaigned at the flyweight and super flyweight divisions, winning world titles in both. After 3 unsuccessful attempts at the world title, Salazar became the IBF World super flyweight champion when he beat Harold Grey in 1995. He would defend the title once before losing it to the same Harold Grey. After that he decided to move down to flyweight and campaign for the WBO World title, winning it against Alberto Jiménez. He defended that title 5 times before losing it to Rubén Sánchez León in controversial fashion as he cited he was hit after the referee had stopped actions and the punch caused him a broken jaw. Salazar decided to retire from boxing after the fight citing medical issues.

== Professional boxing record ==
58 fights	47 wins	8 losses
By knockout	18	1
By decision	29	7
Draws	3	

No.	Result	Record	Opponent	Type	Round, time	Date	Location	Notes
58	Loss	47–8–3	Rubén Sánchez León	TD	8 (12), 2:47	14 Aug 1998	Auditorio del Estado, Mexicali, Mexico	Lost WBO flyweight title
57	Win	47–7–3	José López	UD	12	21 Mar 1998	Club Accion, Presidencia Roque Saenz Pena, Argentina	Retained WBO flyweight title
56	Win	46–7–3	Everardo Morales	UD	12	10 Oct 1997	Club Regatas de Resistencia, Resistencia, Argentina	Retained WBO flyweight title
55	Win	45–7–3	Salvatore Fanni	UD	12	19 Jul 1997	Anfiteatro, Porto Rotondo, Italy	Retained WBO flyweight title
54	Win	44–7–3	Antonio Ruiz	UD	12	23 May 1997	Presidencia Roque Saenz Pena, Chaco, Argentina	Retained WBO flyweight title
53	Draw	43–7–3	Antonio Ruiz	SD	12	23 May 1997	Parque de Beisbol Ferrocarril, Mexicali, Mexico	Retained WBO flyweight title
52	Win	43–7–2	Alberto Jiménez	TKO	10 (12)	13 Dec 1996	Lanus, Buenos Aires, Argentina	Won WBO flyweight title
51	Draw	42–7–2	Alberto Jiménez	SD	12	6 Sep 1996	Sociedad de Formento, Villa Ballester, Argentina	For WBO flyweight title
50	Win	42–7–1	Jorge Fernando Calfin	PTS	10	20 Jul 1996	Maldonado, Uriguay	
49	Loss	41–7–1	Harold Grey	UD	12	27 Apr 1996	Coliseo Bernardo Caraballo, Cartagena, Colombia	Lost IBF super flyweight title
48	Win	41–6–1	Antonello Melis	TKO	6 (12), 2:50	10 Feb 1996	Palasport, Roma, Italy	Retained IBF super flyweight title
47	Win	40–6–1	Harold Grey	SD	12	7 Oct 1995	Estadio Super Domo, Mar del Plata, Argentina	Won IBF super flyweight title
46	Win	39–6–1	Mario Crispín Romero	KO	3 (10)	2 Sep 1995	Club Juventud Unida, Gualeguaychú, Argentina	
45	Win	38–6–1	Néstor Luis Paniagua	PTS	10	29 Apr 1995	Estadio F.A.B., Buenos Aires, Argentina	
44	Win	37–6–1	Víctor Hugo Fuentealba	KO	4 (10)	22 Mar 1995	Estadio F.A.B., Buenos Aires, Argentina	
43	Win	36–6–1	Jorge Fernando Calfin	TKO	6 (10)	17 Dec 1994	Estadio F.A.B., Buenos Aires, Argentina	
42	Loss	35–6–1	Hiroshi Kawashima	UD	12	7 Aug 1994	Ariake Coliseum, Tokyo, Japan	For WBC super flyweight title
41	Loss	35–5–1	Marco Antonio Barrera	MD	10	13 Apr 1994	Estadio F.A.B., Buenos Aires, Argentina	
40	Win	35–4–1	Mozart Gomes Dos Santos	TD	3 (10)	12 Feb 1994	Buenos Aires, Argentina	
39	Win	34–4–1	Ceferino Sánchez	TKO	6 (8)	4 Dec 1993	Estadio F.A.B., Buenos Aires, Argentina	
38	Loss	33–4–1	Moon Sung-kil	SD	12	3 Jul 1993	Education Culture Center, Seoul, South Korea	For WBC super flyweight title
37	Win	33–3–1	Luis Alberto Vargas	PTS	10	20 Mar 1993	Buenos Aires, Argentina	
36	Win	32–3–1	Walter Oscar De Gracia	PTS	10	12 Dec 1992	Estadio F.A.B., Buenos Aires, Argentina	
35	Win	31–3–1	Adrián Cristian Ochoa	TKO	7 (10)	24 Oct 1992	Buenos Aires, Argentina	
34	Win	30–3–1	Agustín José López	UD	10	22 Aug 1992	Buenos Aires, Argentina	
33	Win	29–3–1	Julio Gudino	PTS	10	18 Jul 1992	Buenos Aires, Argentina	
32	Win	28–3–1	José Ramón Soto	TKO	10 (10)	19 Jun 1992	La Plata, Buenos Aires, Argentina	
31	Win	27–3–1	José Ramón Soto	TKO	3 (10)	16 May 1992	Buenos Aires, Argentina	
30	Win	26–3–1	Héctor Fabián Jaime	PTS	10	11 Apr 1992	Buenos Aires, Argentina	
29	Win	25–3–1	Oscar Dante Reynoso	PTS	10	16 Nov 1991	Estadio F.A.B., Buenos Aires, Argentina	
28	Win	24–3–1	Roberto Schonning	PTS	10	29 Oct 1991	Presidencia Roque Saenz Pena, Chaco, Argentina	
27	Win	23–3–1	Jose Hamilton Rodrigues	PTS	12	13 Jul 1991	Charata, Chaco, Argentina	Won South American flyweight title
26	Win	22–3–1	Redigildo Conceicao	PTS	10	30 Jun 1991	Charata, Chaco, Argentina	
25	Win	21–3–1	Antonio Vallejos	PTS	10	24 May 1991	Barranqueras, Chaco, Argentina	
24	Loss	20–3–1	Hugo Rafael Soto	RTD	8 (12)	16 Nov 1990	Catamarca City, Catamarca, Argentina	For Argentina flyweight title
23	Loss	20–2–1	Sot Chitalada	UD	12	1 May 1990	Army Sports Stadium, Bangkok, Thailand	For WBC flyweight title
22	Win	20–1–1	Adrián Damián Román	KO	4 (12)	11 Apr 1990	Catamarca City, Catamarca, Argentina	Won South American flyweight title
21	Draw	19–1–1	Ruben Condori	PTS	10	11 Nov 1989	Presidencia Roque Saenz Pena, Chaco, Argentina	
20	Win	19–1	Roy Thompson	UD	10	7 Oct 1989	Gimnasio Nuevo Panama, Panama City, Panama	
19	Win	18–1	Ruben Condori	PTS	10	24 Jun 1989	Presidencia Roque Saenz Pena, Chaco, Argentina	
18	Win	17–1	Carlos Benito Rejala	KO	1 (10)	22 Apr 1989	Presidencia Roque Saenz Pena, Chaco, Argentina	
17	Win	16–1	Sergio Andres Carlevaris	PTS	10	18 Mar 1989	Presidencia Roque Saenz Pena, Chaco, Argentina	
16	Win	15–1	Adrian Daniel Roman	PTS	12	18 Dec 1988	Argentina	
15	Win	14–1	Rodolfo Duran	KO	7 (10)	14 Oct 1988	Presidencia Roque Saenz Pena, Chaco, Argentina	
14	Win	13–1	Hector Luis Patri	PTS	10	2 Sep 1988	Presidencia Roque Saenz Pena, Chaco, Argentina	
13	Loss	12–1	Ruben Condori	PTS	10	1 Jul 1988	Tartagal, Salta, Argentina	
12	Win	12–0	Domingo Santos Aragon	PTS	10	18 Jun 1988	Presidencia Roque Saenz Pena, Chaco, Argentina	
11	Win	11–0	Domingo Santos Aragon	PTS	10	14 May 1988	Presidencia Roque Saenz Pena, Chaco, Argentina	
10	Win	10–0	Julio Cesar Olivera	RTD	3 (6)	16 Apr 1988	Presidencia Roque Saenz Pena, Chaco, Argentina	
9	Win	9–0	Ramon Jose Cufre	KO	3 (8)	11 Mar 1988	Presidencia Roque Saenz Pena, Chaco, Argentina	
8	Win	8–0	Ramon Jose Cufre	TKO	6 (8)	20 Nov 1987	Presidencia Roque Saenz Pena, Chaco, Argentina	
7	Win	7–0	Oscar Vergara	PTS	10	16 Oct 1987	Presidencia Roque Saenz Pena, Chaco, Argentina	
6	Win	6–0	Oscar Vergara	PTS	10	18 Sep 1987	Presidencia Roque Saenz Pena, Chaco, Argentina	
5	Win	5–0	Mario Gustavo Quintana	KO	1 (8)	8 May 1987	Presidencia Roque Saenz Pena, Chaco, Argentina	
4	Win	4–0	Enrique Jose Caro	KO	3 (6)	10 Apr 1987	Presidencia Roque Saenz Pena, Chaco, Argentina	
3	Win	3–0	Oscar Ledesma	PTS	10	12 Dec 1986	Presidencia Roque Saenz Pena, Chaco, Argentina	
2	Win	2–0	Ricardo Escobar Baez	PTS	10	4 Apr 1986	Presidencia Roque Saenz Pena, Chaco, Argentina	
1	Win	1–0	Roberto Ledesma	TKO	2 (6)	7 Dec 1985	Estadio Luna Park, Buenos Aires, Argentina	

== Titles in boxing ==
=== Major world titles ===
- WBO flyweight champion (112 lbs)
- IBF super flyweight champion (115 lbs)

=== Regional/International titles ===
- South American flyweight champion (112 lbs) (2x)

== See also ==
- List of flyweight boxing champions
- List of super-flyweight boxing champions

Sporting positions
Major world boxing titles
Preceded by Harold Grey	IBF super flyweight champion 7 October 1995 - 27 April 1996	Succeeded by Harold Grey
Preceded by Alberto Jiménez	WBO flyweight champion 13 December 1996 - 14 August 1998	Succeeded by Rubén Sánchez León
