= James Murray (boxer) =

Scottish boxer

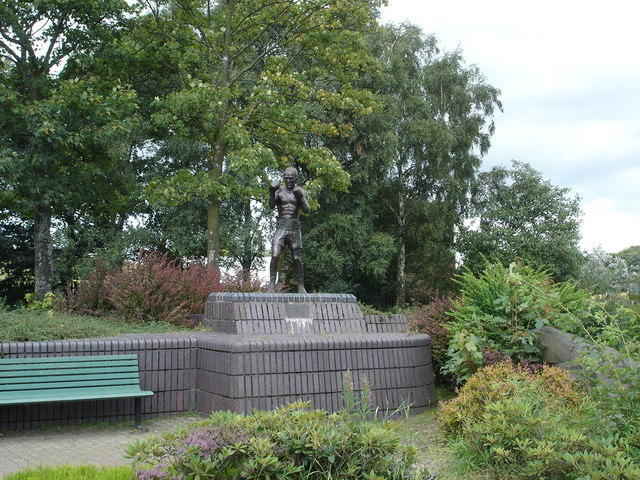
- Murray's bronze statue in Newmains

Personal information
- Nickname: Jim Murray
- Nationality: Scottish
- Born: 7 December 1969 Lanark, Scotland
- Died: 15 October 1995 (aged 25)
- Height: 5 ft 4 in (1.63 m)
- Weight: bantamweight

Boxing career
- Stance: southpaw

Boxing record
- Total fights: 17
- Wins: 15
- Win by KO: 5
- Losses: 2

James Murray (7 December 1969 – 15 October 1995) was a Scottish professional bantamweight boxer. He died as a result of injuries sustained in his last fight.

== Career ==
Murray was born in Lanark, Scotland. He won the BBBofC Scottish Area bantamweight title in November 1994, and defended it once.

On 13 October 1995, Murray was unknowingly a victim of a bleed in his brain; during the fight he fell to the floor of the ring and had a seizure. This match was against Drew Docherty for the BBBofC British bantamweight title fight at the Hospitality Inn in Glasgow. He died of brain injuries two days later, aged 25. Murray compiled a 15-win (5 by knockout), 2-loss, no draws record.

Prior to that, Bradley Stone died of a brain hemorrhage after he lost his fight for the BBBofC British super bantamweight title at the York Hall in London in April 1994. Frank Warren who promoted Murray's last fight established the Murray Stone Fund named after those two boxers to finance the MRI scan for every British fighter.

A bronze statue of Murray was erected in Newmains, North Lanarkshire, Scotland in the following year.
