= Joe Kelly (boxer) =

Scottish boxer (born 1964)

Personal information
- Nationality: British
- Born: Joseph Kelly; 18 May 1964 (age 62) Glasgow, Scotland
- Weight: Flyweight, bantamweight

Boxing career

Boxing record
- Total fights: 27
- Wins: 18
- Win by KO: 6
- Losses: 7
- Draws: 2
Medal record
Representing Scotland
Commonwealth Games
Silver medal – second place	1982 Brisbane	Flyweight

Joseph "Joe" Kelly (born 18 May 1964) is a Scottish former boxer who won the ABA title and the Commonwealth Games silver medal at flyweight in 1982, and after turning professional was British bantamweight champion in 1992.

== Career ==
=== Amateur ===
Born in Glasgow, Kelly fought out of the Holyrood ABC. He won the ABA flyweight title in 1982 and the same year fought for Scotland at the Commonwealth Games in Brisbane, taking the silver medal at flyweight after losing in the final to Kenyan Michael Mutua.

In November 1983 he won the Western District Boxing Championships at flyweight.

=== Professional ===
Kelly made his professional debut in January 1985, being stopped in the third round by Bobby McDermott. He was unbeaten in his next five fights, including a draw with former British champion Kelvin Smart, and in October 1986, in only his seventh professional fight, he faced Dave McAuley for the vacant British title; McAuley stopped him in the ninth round.

After winning his next six fights, in September 1987 he faced the then unbeaten Pat Clinton at the York Hall, Bethnal Green, for the vacant Scottish Area title, with Clinton stopping him in the second round. In March 1988 the two met again, with the vacant British title also at stake. The fight went the distance, with Clinton getting the decision.

In February 1990 Kelly stopped Reginald Brown in the tenth round at the Richmond Coliseum to take the vacant IBF Inter-Continental flyweight title. In February 1991 he faced Salvatore Fanni in Cagliari for the vacant European title, the Italian stopping him inside a minute of the second round. In May that year he made a third attempt to win the (again vacant) British title when he faced Robbie Regan at the National Sports Centre in Cardiff. Referee Dave Parris gave the decision to Regan by a single point.

Kelly then moved up to bantamweight and in October 1991 faced Ronnie Carroll for the vacant British title. The fight ended in a draw and they mat again three months later, this time with Kelly getting the decision to become British champion. In June he made his first defence of the title, and was stopped in the fifth round by Drew Docherty. This proved to be Kelly's final fight.

Personal Life

Kelly married Diane Freckleton. They have two children together, Adam (born 1993) and Robyn (born 1996). Kelly and Freckleton have since divorced.
