= Patrick Mullings =

English boxer (born 1970)

Personal information
- Nickname: Schoolboy
- Born: 19 October 1970 (age 55) Harlesden, England
- Height: 5 ft 4 1/2 in (1.64 m)
- Weight: Bantam; Super bantam; Feather; Super featherweight

Boxing career
- Reach: 65 in (165 cm)
- Stance: Orthodox

Boxing record
- Total fights: 30
- Wins: 24 (KO 12)
- Losses: 6 (KO 2)

Patrick "Schoolboy" Mullings (born 19 October 1970) is an English amateur bantamweight and professional super bantam/feather/super featherweight boxer of the 1990s and 2000s, who as an amateur was the runner-up for the 1990 Amateur Boxing Association of England (ABAE) bantamweight title, against Paul Lloyd (Vauxhall Motors ABC (Ellesmere Port)), and won the 1992 Amateur Boxing Association of England (ABAE) bantamweight title, against Michael Alldis (Crawley ABC), boxing out of St Patricks ABC, and as a professional won the World Boxing Council (WBC) International super bantamweight title, International Boxing Organization (IBO) super bantamweight title, BBBofC (BBBofC) British super bantamweight title, International Boxing Organization (IBO) Inter-Continental super bantamweight title, and Commonwealth featherweight title, and was a challenger for the BBBofC Southern Area super bantamweight title against Spencer Oliver, and International Boxing Organization super bantamweight title against Simon Ramoni, his professional fighting weight varied from 119 lb (54 kg; 8 st 7 lb), i.e. bantamweight to 127 lb (58 kg; 9 st 1 lb), i.e. super featherweight. Patrick Mullings was managed by Frank Maloney.
