= José Antonio López Bueno =

Spanish boxer (born 1974)

Personal information
- Nationality: Spanish
- Born: August 16, 1974 (age 51) Zaragoza, Aragon, Spain
- Height: 5 ft 2 1/2 in (159 cm)
- Weight: Flyweight

Boxing career
- Stance: Orthodox

Boxing record
- Total fights: 45
- Wins: 31
- Win by KO: 15
- Losses: 10
- Draws: 4

José Antonio López Bueno (born August 16, 1974) is a Spanish former professional boxer who competed from 1994 to 2010. He won the WBO flyweight title in 1999.

== Professional career ==
Bueno turned professional in 1994 & amassed a record of 11-3-2 before facing and defeating Mexico's Rubén Sánchez León, to win the WBO flyweight title. He would retire from the sport in 2010, having his final fight in May of the same year.

== Professional boxing record ==
45 fights	31 wins	10 losses
By knockout	15	3
By decision	15	7
By disqualification	1	0
Draws	4	

No.	Result	Record	Opponent	Type	Round, time	Date	Location	Notes
45	Win	31–10–4	Oleg Mustafini	PTS	6 (6)	2010-05-08	Palacio de los Deportes, Zaragoza, Spain	
44	Win	30–10–4	Jordi Gallart	UD	10 (10)	2009-05-22	Palacio de los Deportes de La Rioja, Logrono, Spain	For Spanish flyweight title
43	Loss	29–10–4	Jordi Gallart	UD	10 (10)	2009-03-27	Polideportivo Municipal Sagnier, El Prat de Llobregat, Spain	For vacant Spanish flyweight title
42	Loss	29–9–4	Lahcene Zemmouri	RTD	7 (12)	2007-10-20	Torredembarra, Spain	For vacant EBU European Union flyweight title
41	Draw	29–8–4	Christophe Rodrigues	TD	4 (12)	2007-06-01	Chapiteau place Miot, Ajaccio, France	For vacant EBU European Union flyweight title
40	Win	29–8–3	Cristian Niculae	PTS	6 (6)	2006-09-09	Zaragoza, Spain	
39	Win	28–8–3	Dimitar Alipiev	KO	2 (6)	2006-07-29	Torredembarra, Spain	
38	Win	27–8–3	Dimitri Atanasov	TKO	1 (8)	2005-11-04	Torredembarra, Spain	
37	Loss	26–8–3	Brahim Asloum	KO	3 (12)	2005-03-14	Palais des Sports, Paris, France	For EBU flyweight title
36	Win	26–7–3	Lahcene Zemmouri	PTS	12 (12)	2005-02-25	Torredembarra, Spain	
35	Win	25–7–3	Jorge Tirado	PTS	8 (8)	2004-05-14	Torrelodones, Spain	
34	Loss	24–7–3	Brahim Asloum	MD	12 (12)	2003-11-14	Palais des sports Marcel-Cerdan, Levallois-Perret, France	For vacant EBU flyweight title
33	Win	24–6–3	Manuel Sequera	MD	8 (8)	2003-09-12	La Cubierta, Leganes, Spain	
32	Win	23–6–3	Jorge Tirado	UD	8 (8)	2003-05-30	Pabellon Deportivo, Torredembarra, Spain	
31	Draw	22–6–3	Rafael Tirado	PTS	8 (8)	2003-03-14	Polideportivo Huerta del Rey, Valladolid, Spain	
30	Win	22–6–2	Horlan Hamilton	TKO	4 (8)	2003-02-07	La Cubierta, Leganes, Spain	
29	Win	21–6–2	Marian Mihai Dragutescu	TKO	3 (6)	2002-11-22	Pabellón Municipal, La Baneza, Spain	
28	Win	20–6–2	Vladimir Bukovy	TKO	2 (8)	2002-06-28	Torredembarra, Spain	
27	Win	19–6–2	Wele Maqolo	PTS	8 (8)	2002-05-03	Pabellón Príncipe Felipe, Ciudad Real, Spain	
26	Win	18–6–2	Daniel Kodjo Sassou	PTS	8 (8)	2002-03-15	Palau Blaugrana, Barcelona, Spain	
25	Win	17–6–2	Over Bolanos	PTS	8 (8)	2001-10-19	Palau Blaugrana, Barcelona, Spain	
24	Loss	16–6–2	Aleksandr Makhmutov	UD	12 (12)	2001-03-23	Pabellón Príncipe Felipe, Zaragoza, Spain	For EBU flyweight title
23	Win	16–5–2	Joel Garcia	PTS	8 (8)	2000-11-10	Pabellón Municipal de La Albericia, Santander, Spain	
22	Loss	15–5–2	Damaen Kelly	UD	12 (12)	2000-06-12	Ulster Hall, Belfast, Northern Ireland, U.K.	For EBU flyweight title
21	Win	15–4–2	Fernando Guevara	TKO	6 (8)	2000-04-14	La Cubierta, Leganes, Spain	
20	Loss	14–4–2	Jair Jimenez	TKO	2 (8)	2000-02-11	Leon, Spain	
19	Win	14–3–2	Vladimir Jagunov	TKO	6 (8)	1999-09-17	Zaragoza, Spain	
18	Win	13–3–2	Igor Gerasimov	TKO	7 (12)	1999-06-04	Polideportivo Ciudad Jardín, Malaga, Spain	Retained WBO flyweight title
17	Win	12–3–2	Rubén Sánchez León	TKO	3 (12)	1999-04-23	Pabellón Príncipe Felipe, Zaragoza, Spain	Won WBO flyweight title
16	Win	11–3–2	Morgan Ndumo	KO	2 (12)	1999-02-06	Oviedo, Spain	
15	Win	10–3–2	Dave Coldwell	PTS	12 (12)	1998-12-12	Zaragoza, Spain	Won CBA flyweight title
14	Win	9–3–2	Luis Angel Castellano	TKO	9 (12)	1998-10-10	Zaragoza, Spain	Won WBO Latino Light flyweight title
13	Win	8–3–2	Julian Gomez	KO	2 (10)	1998-07-04	Zaragoza, Spain	Retained Spanish flyweight title
12	Win	7–3–2	Juan Carlos Diaz Quesada	PTS	10 (10)	1998-04-04	Zaragoza, Spain	Retained Spanish flyweight title
11	Win	6–3–2	Jose Ramon Bartolome	KO	1 (10)	1998-01-10	Zaragoza, Spain	Won Spanish flyweight title
10	Win	5–3–2	Juan Carlos Diaz Quesada	KO	2 (12)	1997-11-14	La Línea de la Concepción, Spain	
9	Win	4–3–2	Harry Woods	TKO	5 (6)	1997-02-26	Wales National Ice Rink, Cardiff, Wales, U.K.	
8	Loss	3–3–2	Zoltan Lunka	PTS	6 (6)	1997-01-11	Sport und Erholungszentrum, Berlin, Germany	
7	Loss	3–2–2	Zoltan Lunka	PTS	4 (4)	1996-11-30	Arena Nova, Wiener Neustadt, Austria	
6	Loss	3–1–2	Pedro Miranda	PTS	6 (6)	1996-11-08	Las Palmas, Spain	
5	Win	3–0–2	Pedro Guerra	DQ	4 (6)	1995-07-01	Zaragoza, Spain	
4	Win	2–0–2	Julian Gomez	PTS	6 (6)	1995-01-20	Zaragoza, Spain	
3	Draw	1–0–2	Manuel Fatima Dias	PTS	4 (4)	1994-10-01	Zaragoza, Spain	
2	Draw	1–0–1	Juan Carlos Diaz Quesada	PTS	4 (4)	1994-07-09	Miguel Esteban, Spain	
1	Win	1–0	Juan Carlos Diaz Quesada	PTS	4 (4)	1994-07-02	Zaragoza, Spain	

== See also ==
- List of world flyweight boxing champions

Sporting positions
World boxing titles
Preceded by Rubén Sánchez León	WBO flyweight champion April 23, 1999 – 1999; Vacated	Vacant Title next held by Isidro García
