= Salvatore Fanni =

Italian boxer

Personal information
- Nationality: Italian
- Born: July 10, 1964 (age 62) Cagliari, Italy
- Weight: Light flyweight Flyweight

Boxing career
- Stance: Orthodox

Boxing record
- Total fights: 44
- Wins: 33
- Win by KO: 17
- Losses: 9
- Draws: 2
- No contests: 0

Salvatore Fanni (born July 10, 1964) is an Italian former professional boxer who competed from 1988 to 2003. He held the European flyweight title from February 1991 to November 1992, and unsuccessfully challenged for the WBO flyweight title twice, as well as the WBO light flyweight title once.

== Professional boxing career ==
Fanni made his professional debut on April 10, 1988, beating Tunisian fighter Mohamed ben Ali Saidi in Iglesias. After winning his first 16 fights, he received a shot at the vacant European flyweight title on August 3, 1990, facing Scottish fighter (and future world champion) Pat Clinton in Cagliari. Clinton defeated the Italian by majority decision in what he later called the best performance of his career, saying he was "at the top of [his] game" at the time.

Less than seven months later, he fought Joe Kelly for the same title (again in Cagliari), stopping him inside a minute in the second round, thus becoming the first Italian to hold the European flyweight belt since Franco Cherchi six years earlier. He successfully defended his title in his next four fights, against Danny Porter, James Drummond, Porter and Michele Poddighe, respectfully. Fanni finally lost his belt on November 14, 1992, when Welsh fighter Robbie Regan defeated him by unanimous decision in Cardiff. Regan, a future WBO bantamweight champion himself, called Fanni "one of the best [he ever] fought but... also a true sportsman."

Between 1993 and 1995, Fanni unsuccessfully challenged compatriot Luigi Camputaro for the European flyweight belt on three separate occasions, losing twice and achieving a draw. On May 31, 1996, in what was only his second fight outside of Italy, Fanni challenged Danish fighter Jesper Jensen for the vacant European flyweight belt in Copenhagen. He lost the bout by unanimous decision after 12 rounds. Jensen later ranked his victory over Fanni as one of his greatest achievements. Three months later, Fanni defeated Michele Poddighe, winning the vacant Italian flyweight title, although he never defended it.

By the end of 1996, Fanni had compiled a respectable record of 30-5-2. He finally received his first (of three) world title shots on July 19, 1997, when he matched up against Carlos Gabriel Salazar for his WBO flyweight title in the Italian hamlet of Porto Rotondo. He lost to the Argentine by unanimous decision. His next shot came just over a year later, when he faced Mexican fighter Rubén Sánchez León for the same title in Cagliari. He came away empty-handed though, as he lost to Sánchez León in the same fashion: 12-round UD.

His final world title fight came on April 17, 1999, when he moved down a weight class to challenge 20-year-old Mexican starlet Jorge Arce for his WBO light flyweight belt in Sassari. Arce defeated Fanni by TKO in the sixth round; it was the first and only time Fanni was ever stopped in his career. He received one last shot at the European flyweight title on December 3, 1999, losing to Russian fighter Alexander Makhmutov in Milan. He retired after the bout.

Fanni made his return to the ring more than three years later. He faced Mercurio Ciaramitaro in Aversa on May 31, 2003, two months before his 40th birthday, when his boxing license would be rescinded. In what turned out to be his final fight, Fanni defeated Ciaramitaro by DQ in the fourth round. He finished with a record of 33-9-2.

== Professional boxing record ==
33 Wins (17 knockouts, 16 decisions), 9 Losses (1 knockouts, 8 decisions), 2 Draws
Res.	Record	Opponent	Type	Rd., Time	Date	Location	Notes
Win	33–9–2	(Italy) Mercurio Ciaramitaro	DQ	4 (6)	2003-05-31	Aversa, Italy	
Loss	32–9–2	(Russia) Alexander Makhmutov	PTS	12	1999-12-03	Milan, Italy	For European flyweight title
Loss	32–8–2	(Mexico) Jorge Arce	TKO	6 (12), 1:17	1999-04-17	Palazetto dello Sport, Sassari, Italy	For WBO light flyweight title
Loss	32–7–2	(Mexico) Rubén Sánchez León	UD	12	1998-08-02	Cagliari, Italy	For WBO flyweight title
Win	32–6–2	(Hungary) Bela Sandor	PTS	6	1998-08-02	Cagliari, Italy	
Win	31–6–2	(Romania) Gheorghe Ghiompirica	PTS	8	1997-12-20	Sarroch, Italy	
Loss	30–6–2	(Argentina) Carlos Gabriel Salazar	UD	12	1997-07-19	Anfiteatro, Porto Rotondo, Italy	For WBO flyweight title
Win	30–5–2	(Portugal) Gabriel Pedro Silva Guerra	TKO	5	1996-10-12	Cagliari, Italy	
Win	29–5–2	(Italy) Michele Poddighe	UD	12	1996-08-22	Aulla, Italy	Won vacant Italian flyweight title
Loss	28–5–2	(Denmark) Jesper Jensen	UD	12	1996-05-31	K.B. Hallen, Copenhagen, Denmark	For vacant European flyweight title
Win	28–4–2	(Italy) Michele Poddighe	PTS	8	1996-03-16	Decimomannu, Italy	
Win	27–4–2	(Italy) Michele Poddighe	PTS	8	1995-12-28	Quartu Sant'Elena, Italy	
Loss	26–4–2	(Italy) Luigi Camputaro	PTS	12	1995-09-15	Gioia Sannitica, Italy	For vacant European flyweight title
Draw	26–3–2	(Italy) Luigi Camputaro	PTS	12	1995-06-10	Guspini, Italy	For vacant European flyweight title
Win	26–3–1	(Spain) Julian Gomez	TKO	5 (6)	1995-04-21	Quartu Sant'Elena, Italy	
Win	25–3–1	(Argentina) Jose Ramon Soto	TKO	5 (8)	1994-08-31	Cagliari, Italy	
Win	24–3–1	(Mexico) Silverio Porras	TKO	2	1993-12-19	Quartu Sant'Elena, Italy	
Loss	23–3–1	(Italy) Luigi Camputaro	PTS	12	1993-09-22	Oristano, Italy	For vacant European flyweight title
Loss	23–2–1	(United Kingdom) Robbie Regan	UD	12	1992-11-14	(United Kingdom) National Ice Rink, Cardiff, Wales	Lost European flyweight title
Win	23–1–1	(Mexico) Mario Alberto Cruz Alfaro	TKO	6	1992-09-19	Montecatini Terme, Italy	
Win	22–1–1	(Mexico) Juan Pablo Salazar	PTS	8	1992-07-22	Palazzo dello Sport, Capo d'Orlando, Italy	
Win	21–1–1	(Italy) Michele Poddighe	PTS	12	1992-04-30	Cagliari, Italy	Retained European flyweight title
Draw	20–1–1	(United Kingdom) Danny Porter	PTS	12	1992-02-12	Sarno, Italy	Retained European flyweight title
Win	20–1	(United Kingdom) James Drummond	UD	12	1991-11-15	Omegna, Italy	Retained European flyweight title
Win	19–1	(United Kingdom) Danny Porter	TKO	9 (12)	1991-06-12	Sorso, Italy	Retained European flyweight title
Win	18–1	(United Kingdom) Joe Kelly	TKO	2 (12), 0:47	1991-02-23	Cagliari, Italy	Won vacant European flyweight title
Win	17–1	(Argentina) Roberto Ledesma	PTS	8	1990-11-16	Tortolì, Italy	
Loss	16–1	(United Kingdom) Pat Clinton	MD	12	1990-08-03	Cagliari, Italy	For vacant European flyweight title
Win	16–0	(Argentina) Roberto Ledesma	DQ	12	1990-06-02	Salice Terme, Italy	
Win	15–0	(Argentina) Oscar Dante Reynoso	PTS	8	1990-03-30	Cagliari, Italy	
Win	14–0	(United States) John Vasquez	PTS	8	1990-01-29	Milan, Italy	
Win	13–0	(Dominican Republic) Carmelo Fernandez	KO	3	1989-11-06	Rozzano, Italy	
Win	12–0	(Puerto Rico) Julio Osorio	PTS	6	1989-08-05	Porto Columbu, Italy	
Win	11–0	(United Kingdom) Gordon Shaw	PTS	6	1989-07-15	Vigevano, Italy	
Win	10–0	(Mexico) Alberto Cantu	KO	4	1989-04-14	Milan, Italy	
Win	9–0	(United States) Jaime Olvera	KO	2	1989-03-16	Milan, Italy	
Win	8–0	(United States) Juan Camero	TKO	2	1989-02-11	Guspini, Italy	
Win	7–0	(Tunisia) Fethi Touati	TKO	5	1988-12-03	Cagliari, Italy	
Win	6–0	(Tunisia) Fethi Touati	PTS	6	1988-11-22	Milan, Italy	
Win	5–0	(United Kingdom) Tony Smith	KO	1 (6)	1988-10-29	Palatrussardi, Milan, Italy	
Win	4–0	(United Kingdom) David Afan Jones	TKO	3 (8)	1988-10-06	Milan, Italy	
Win	3–0	(Spain) Jose Juarez	KO	2	1988-07-23	Carloforte, Italy	
Win	2–0	(France) Cecilio Ramirez	TKO	1	1988-06-04	Cagliari, Italy	
Win	1–0	(Tunisia) Mohamed ben Ali Saidi	KO	5	1988-04-10	Iglesias, Italy	

== Personal life ==
Hailing from Cagliari, Fanni is the twelfth among thirteen siblings. His father was a fisherman while his mother stayed at home.

After retiring for good in 2003, he settled in the Is Mirrionis district of Cagliari with his wife and three kids, and has spent most of his time volunteering.

His youngest, Maurizio Fanni, trains to become a boxer like his father. He previously played football with teams such as Kolbe and Gigi Riva but plans to abandon the sport to compete in boxing.

== See also ==
- List of European Boxing Union flyweight champions

Sporting positions
Regional boxing titles
Vacant Title last held by Pat Clinton	EBU Flyweight Champion; February 23, 1991 – November 14, 1992	Succeeded by Robbie Regan
