= Harold Grey =

Colombian boxer (born 1971)

Personal information
- Born: Harold Gray Rengifo; December 20, 1971 (age 54) Arjona, Bolívar, Colombia
- Height: 5 ft 6 in (168 cm)
- Weight: Super flyweight

Boxing career
- Reach: 67 in (170 cm)
- Stance: Orthodox

Boxing record
- Total fights: 31
- Wins: 25
- Win by KO: 17
- Losses: 6

Harold Grey (born December 20, 1971) is a former boxer who was the IBF super flyweight champion twice in the mid-1990s. He was born in Arjona, Bolívar, Colombia.

== Pro career ==
Grey turned pro in 1990 and won his first 16 fights, setting up an IBF super flyweight title fight against Julio César Borboa in 1994. Grey won very disputed split decision, and defended the belt three times before losing it to Carlos Gabriel Salazar by decision in 1995. Grey regained the belt in a win over Salazar in a rematch in 1996, but lost the belt later that year when he was defeated by Danny Romero in two rounds. Grey retired in 2004.

== Professional boxing record ==
31 fights	25 wins	6 losses
By knockout	17	4
By decision	8	1
By disqualification	0	1

No.	Result	Record	Opponent	Type	Round, time	Date	Location	Notes
31	Loss	25–6	Carl Johanneson	TKO	5 (8)	2004-01-30	The Blue Horizon, Philadelphia, Pennsylvania, U.S.	
30	Loss	25–5	Jorge Lacierva	KO	1 (10)	2003-09-13	Pechanga Resort & Casino, Temecula, California, U.S.	
29	Win	25–4	José Quintana	UD	10 (10)	2003-06-06	Mohegan Sun Arena, Uncasville, Connecticut, U.S.	
28	Loss	24–4	John Michael Johnson	KO	7 (12)	2001-09-23	Sunset Station, San Antonio, Texas, U.S.	For vacant IBA super-bantamweight title
27	Loss	24–3	Elmer Reales	DQ	5 (10)	2000-06-30	Barranquilla, Colombia	
26	Win	24–2	Jud Granada	KO	3 (?)	1999-06-26	Pasto, Colombia	
25	Win	23–2	Antonio Osorio	TKO	4 (8)	1999-04-30	Cartagena, Colombia	
24	Win	22–2	Freddy Silgado	UD	8 (8)	1998-02-14	Cartagena, Colombia	
23	Loss	21–2	Danny Romero	KO	2 (12)	1996-08-24	University Arena, Albuquerque, New Mexico, U.S.	Lost IBF super-flyweight title
22	Win	21–1	Carlos Gabriel Salazar	UD	12 (12)	1996-04-27	Coliseo Bernardo Caraballo, Cartagena, Colombia	Won IBF super-flyweight title
21	Loss	20–1	Carlos Gabriel Salazar	SD	12 (12)	1995-10-07	Estadio Super Domo, Mar del Plata, Argentina	Lost IBF super-flyweight title
20	Win	20–0	Julio César Borboa	SD	12 (12)	1995-06-24	Coliseo Bernardo Caraballo, Cartagena, Colombia	Retained IBF super-flyweight title
19	Win	19–0	Orlando Tobon	MD	12 (12)	1995-03-18	Coliseo Bernardo Caraballo, Cartagena, Colombia	Retained IBF super-flyweight title
18	Win	18–0	Vincenzo Belcastro	SD	12 (12)	1994-12-17	Teatro Tenda della Fiera Campionaria, Cagliari, Italy	Retained IBF super-flyweight title
17	Win	17–0	Julio César Borboa	SD	12 (12)	1994-08-29	Great Western Forum, Inglewood, California, U.S.	Won IBF super-flyweight title
16	Win	16–0	Miguel Nino	TKO	2 (?)	1994-05-06	Cartagena, Colombia	
15	Win	15–0	Juan Benjamin Sanchez	KO	6 (?)	1993-04-30	Barranquilla, Colombia	
14	Win	14–0	Emiliano Ferrer	KO	4 (?)	1993-03-27	Barranquilla, Colombia	
13	Win	13–0	Javier Varona	KO	1 (?)	1993-02-19	Cartagena, Colombia	
12	Win	12–0	Ramiro Carvajal	KO	2 (?)	1993-01-29	Sabanalarga, Colombia	
11	Win	11–0	Alfredo Lugo	TKO	4 (?)	1992-12-14	Barranquilla, Colombia	
10	Win	10–0	Simon Morales	KO	3 (6)	1992-04-30	Cartagena, Colombia	
9	Win	9–0	Angel Escorcia	KO	3 (?)	1992-03-28	Cartagena, Colombia	
8	Win	8–0	Tobias Caraballo	TKO	4 (?)	1992-02-21	Cartagena, Colombia	
7	Win	7–0	Alvaro Vega	PTS	6 (6)	1991-08-23	Cartagena, Colombia	
6	Win	6–0	Durvey Osorio	KO	1 (?)	1991-07-31	Barranquilla, Colombia	
5	Win	5–0	Apolinar Castro	TKO	3 (?)	1991-06-01	Barranquilla, Colombia	
4	Win	4–0	Andres Sanchez	KO	1 (?)	1991-04-27	Barranquilla, Colombia	
3	Win	3–0	Dionisio Arias	KO	3 (?)	1991-04-05	Cartagena, Colombia	
2	Win	2–0	James Guevara	KO	3 (?)	1991-03-16	Estadio Tomás Suri Salcedo, Barranquilla, Colombia	
1	Win	1–0	Roberto Silgado	KO	1 (?)	1990-11-30	Coliseo Bernardo Caraballo, Cartagena, Colombia	

== See also ==
- List of world super-flyweight boxing champions

Sporting positions
World boxing titles
Preceded by Julio César Borboa	IBF super-flyweight champion August 29, 1994 – October 7, 1995	Succeeded by Carlos Gabriel Salazar
Preceded by Carlos Gabriel Salazar	IBF super-flyweight champion April 27, 1996 – August 24, 1996	Succeeded by Danny Romero
