= Paul Lloyd (boxer) =

English boxer (1968–2026)

Personal information
- Nickname: Livewire
- Nationality: English
- Born: 7 December 1968 Bebington, Merseyside, England
- Died: 19 September 2026 (aged 57)
- Height: 5 ft 7 in (170 cm)
- Weight: bantam/super bantamweight

Boxing career

Boxing record
- Total fights: 27
- Wins: 20 (KO 14)
- Losses: 7 (KO 6)

Paul Lloyd (7 December 1968 – 19 September 2026) was an English amateur bantamweight and professional bantam/super bantamweight boxer of the 1990s and 2000s. Later gaining the nickname "Livewire", as an amateur, Lloyd won the 1990 Amateur Boxing Association of England (ABAE) bantamweight title against Michael Gibbons, Michael Alldis, Wilson Docherty, and Patrick Mullings (Harrow & District ABC).

== Biography ==
Lloyd was born in Bebington, Merseyside on 7 December 1968. He participated in the World Cup in Bombay, India, during November 1990, defeating Rico Maspaitela of Indonesia and losing to Enrique Carrión of Cuba. He participated in the trials for the 1992 Summer Olympics in Halle, Germany, defeating Shaun Anderson of Scotland and losing to Dieter Berg of Germany.

He won the gold medal at bantamweight at the 1992 Canada Cup in Ottawa, Canada, during May 1992, defeating Lorenzo Aragon Armenteros of Cuba, Mark Mercier of Canada, and Alexei Aztamohov of Russia. Boxing out of Vauxhall Motors ABC (Ellesmere Port), and as a professional, he won the British Boxing Board of Control (BBBofC) Central Area super bantamweight title, BBBofC British bantamweight title, European Boxing Union (EBU) bantamweight title, and Commonwealth bantamweight title.

Lloyd was a challenger for the BBBofC British super bantamweight title against Richie Wenton, International Boxing Federation (IBF) bantamweight title against Tim Austin, World Boxing Organization (WBO) super bantamweight title against Marco Antonio Barrera, International Boxing Council bantamweight title against Johnny Bredahl, and International Boxing Organization bantamweight title against Noel Wilders.

Lloyd died in September 2026, aged 57.
