= Robert Quiroga =

American boxer (1969-2004)

Personal information
- Nickname: Pikin
- Nationality: (United States) American
- Born: Robert Quiroga; October 10, 1969 San Antonio, Texas, USA
- Died: August 16, 2004 (aged 34) San Antonio, Texas, USA
- Height: 5 ft 4 in (162 cm)
- Weight: Flyweight; Super flyweight

Boxing career
- Stance: Orthodox

Boxing record
- Total fights: 22
- Wins: 20
- Win by KO: 11
- Losses: 2
- Draws: 0
- No contests: 0

Robert Quiroga (October 10, 1969 – August 16, 2004) was the International Boxing Federation Super flyweight champion from 1990 to 1993. Quiroga successfully defended his title five times and retired in 1995. He finished with 20–2 with 11 KOs. Quiroga was the first world champion from San Antonio, Texas.

== Professional career ==
Quiroga made his professional debut on March 16, 1987, at the age of 17. In his 12th professional fight, he defeated former WBA light flyweight champion Joey Olivo. Two fights later, he claimed the IBF Super Flyweight title with a decision win over champion Juan Polo Perez. Later that year, he defended his title with victories over Vuyani Nene and Vincenzo Belcastro.

On June 15, 1991, at the HemisFair Arena in San Antonio, Quiroga defended his IBF Super Flyweight Title for the third time with a brutal and bloody twelve-round unanimous decision over undefeated "Kid" Akeem Anifowoshe. Anifowoshe collapsed after the fight with a blood clot on the brain, and never fought again. The fight was named 1991 Ring Magazine Fight of the Year. The following year, he defeated undefeated challenger Carlos Mercado and former WBO Super Flyweight champion Jose Ruiz.

In 1993, his championship reign came to an end with a tko loss to Julio César Borboa. He returned to the ring in 1995, but lost by majority decision.

== Murder ==
On August 16, 2004, Richard Merla, then a member of the Bandidos Motorcycle Club, was playing cards with Quiroga when a dispute arose concerning a Scarface poster that Merla had taken from one of Quiroga's friends. Merla stabbed Quiroga later that night and Quiroga subsequently died on the scene. Afterwards, the Bandidos member was convicted of the murder and received a sentence of 40 years in prison. The Bandidos released an official statement that the former member (Richard Merla) had acted alone and without the consent or knowledge of the club, and he was expelled as a member.

== See also ==
- List of super-flyweight boxing champions

Achievements
Preceded by Juan Polo Perez	IBF super flyweight champion April 21, 1990 – January 16, 1993	Succeeded by Julio César Borboa
Awards
Preceded by Julio César Chávez KO12 Meldrick Taylor	The Ring magazine Fight of the Year; W12 Akeem Anifowoshe; 1991	Succeeded by Riddick Bowe W12 Evander Holyfield
