= Rubén Sánchez León =

Mexican boxer (born 1973)

Personal information
- Nickname: Yiyo
- Born: August 21, 1973 (age 52) Mexicali, Baja California, Mexico
- Height: 5 ft 4 in (163 cm)
- Weight: Flyweight; Super flyweight

Boxing career
- Stance: Orthodox

Boxing record
- Total fights: 51
- Wins: 33
- Win by KO: 14
- Losses: 17
- Draws: 1

Rubén Sánchez León (born August 21, 1973) is a Mexican retired professional boxer. He is the former WBO flyweight champion.

== Professional career ==
Rubén turned professional in 1992 and compiled a record of 22–7–1 before upsetting Argentina's Carlos Gabriel Salazar with an eighth round stoppage victory to win the WBO flyweight title. He defended it once against Italian contender Salvatore Fanni before losing the title against Jose Antonio Lopez Bueno via stoppage loss.

He would move up to super flyweight and face WBO champion Fernando Montiel in a non title fight, he would lose via second round stoppage.

== Professional boxing record ==
51 fights	33 wins	17 losses
By knockout	14	6
By decision	18	11
By disqualification	1	0
Draws	1	

No.	Result	Record	Opponent	Type	Round, time	Date	Location	Notes
51	Win	33–17–1	Cristian Aguilar Galaz	RTD	3 (8)	2013-02-22	Gimnasio de Mexicali, Mexicali, Mexico	
50	Win	32–17–1	Israel Barron	UD	8 (8)	2011-10-01	Ciudad Morelos, Mexico	
49	Loss	31–17–1	Sergio Perales	TKO	8 (10)	2010-12-10	Casa de Amistad, Harlingen, Texas, U.S.	
48	Win	31–16–1	Juan Salgado	KO	1 (10)	2010-10-30	Hotel Hacienda Coral, San Felipe, Mexico	
47	Loss	30–16–1	Roberto Lopez	TKO	10 (12)	2006-07-07	El Nido Sports Center, Mexicali, Mexico	
46	Win	30–15–1	Martin Ruiz	KO	3 (10)	2006-05-19	El Nido Sports Center, Mexicali, Mexico	
45	Win	29–15–1	Juventino Delgado	TKO	1 (10)	2006-03-31	El Nido Sports Center, Mexicali, Mexico	
44	Loss	28–15–1	Luis Maldonado	UD	10 (10)	2003-11-14	Gimnasio de Mexicali, Mexicali, Mexico	
43	Loss	28–14–1	Fernando Montiel	TKO	2 (10)	2003-05-09	Sports Arena, San Diego, California, U.S.	
42	Win	28–13–1	Francisco Paredes	DQ	4 (10)	2003-01-31	Gimnasio de Mexicali, Mexicali, Mexico	
41	Loss	27–13–1	Jose Luis Araiza	SD	12 (12)	2002-11-01	Palenque del Parque Vicente Guerrero, Mexicali, Mexico	For vacant Mexican Pacific Coast super-flyweight title
40	Loss	27–12–1	Melchor Cob Castro	TKO	9 (10)	2002-06-25	Ho-Chunk Casino, Baraboo, Wisconsin, U.S.	
39	Loss	27–11–1	Manuel Sarabia	SD	10 (10)	2002-03-01	Auditorio del Estado, Mexicali, Mexico	
38	Win	27–10–1	Gabriel Munoz	PTS	10 (10)	2002-01-01	Mexicali, Mexico	
37	Loss	26–10–1	Ricardo Vargas	UD	10 (10)	2001-08-24	The Orleans, Paradise, Nevada, U.S.	
36	Loss	26–9–1	Alejandro Montiel	UD	12 (12)	2001-05-11	Convention Center, Tulsa, Oklahoma, U.S.	For vacant IBA flyweight title
35	Win	26–8–1	Tomas Rivera	TD	7 (10)	2000-04-14	The Orleans, Paradise, Nevada, U.S.	
34	Win	25–8–1	Gabriel Munoz	PTS	12 (12)	2000-02-04	Mexicali, Mexico	Won vacant WBC FECARBOX flyweight title
33	Loss	24–8–1	José Antonio López Bueno	TKO	3 (12)	1999-04-23	Pabellón Príncipe Felipe, Zaragoza, Spain	Lost WBO flyweight title
32	Win	24–7–1	Salvatore Fanni	UD	12 (12)	1998-12-18	Palazzetto dello Sport, Cagliari, Italy	Retained WBO flyweight title
31	Win	23–7–1	Carlos Gabriel Salazar	TD	8 (12)	1998-08-14	Auditorio del Estado, Mexicali, Mexico	Won WBO flyweight title
30	Win	22–7–1	José de Jesús	TKO	8 (12)	1998-04-25	Mahi Temple Shrine Auditorium, Miami, Florida, U.S.	
29	Win	21–7–1	Javier Varguez	UD	12 (12)	1998-01-01	Auditorio del Estado, Mexicali, Mexico	
28	Win	20–7–1	Miguel Martinez	UD	12 (12)	1997-10-31	Centro de Espectáculos Aragon's, Mexicali, Mexico	
27	Loss	19–7–1	Ricardo Medina	PTS	12 (12)	1997-05-17	Mexico City, Mexico	For Mexican super-flyweight title
26	Win	19–6–1	Alberto Martinez	TKO	7 (12)	1997-02-28	Palenque del Parque Vicente Guerrero, Mexicali, Mexico	
25	Win	18–6–1	Manuel Sarabia	TKO	8 (12)	1996-12-13	Palenque del Parque Vicente Guerrero, Mexicali, Mexico	
24	Win	17–6–1	Manuel Sarabia	KO	9 (10)	1996-11-03	Centro de Espectáculos Aragon's, Mexicali, Mexico	
23	Win	16–6–1	Antonio Ruiz	MD	10 (10)	1996-08-23	Parque de Beisbol Ferrocarril, Mexicali, Mexico	
22	Win	15–6–1	Jose Jimenez Valenzuela	UD	12 (12)	1996-06-28	Palenque del Parque Vicente Guerrero, Mexicali, Mexico	
21	Win	14–6–1	Jesus Jimenez Ruiz	TKO	7 (10)	1996-05-17	Palenque del Parque Vicente Guerrero, Mexicali, Mexico	
20	Win	13–6–1	Felipe Alvarez	TKO	8 (?)	1996-04-28	Mexico	
19	Win	12–6–1	Sammy Stewart	PTS	10 (10)	1996-04-09	Fantasy Springs Resort Casino, Indio, California, U.S.	
18	Win	11–6–1	Victor Hernandez	TKO	5 (12)	1996-02-16	Palenque del Parque Vicente Guerrero, Mexicali, Mexico	
17	Win	10–6–1	Pablo Tiznado	PTS	10 (10)	1996-01-01	Centro de Espectáculos Aragon's, Mexicali, Mexico	
16	Loss	9–6–1	Isidro García	UD	6 (6)	1995-10-23	Great Western Forum, Inglewood, California, U.S.	
15	Loss	9–5–1	Jose Jimenez Valenzuela	PTS	12 (12)	1995-08-22	Tijuana, Mexico	
14	Win	9–4–1	Jose Luis Herrera	UD	10 (10)	1995-02-24	Palenque del Parque Vicente Guerrero, Mexicali, Mexico	
13	Loss	8–4–1	Alfonso Resendez	UD	8 (8)	1994-12-02	Tarrant County Convention Center, Fort Worth, Texas, U.S.	
12	Win	8–3–1	Julio Luna	PTS	6 (6)	1994-09-28	Huntington Park, California, U.S.	
11	Loss	7–3–1	Henry Martínez	TKO	6 (?)	1994-04-23	Grand Olympic Auditorium, Los Angeles, California, U.S.	
10	Win	7–2–1	Jesse Miranda	PTS	8 (8)	1994-03-28	Great Western Forum, Inglewood, California, U.S.	
9	Win	6–2–1	Marius Heriberto Frias	UD	4 (4)	1994-02-12	Indio Bingo Palace and Casino, Indio, California, U.S.	
8	Win	5–2–1	Luis Montano	KO	2 (?)	1993-12-20	Ensenada, Mexico	
7	Loss	4–2–1	Jesse Miranda	UD	6 (6)	1993-10-16	Empire Polo Club, Indio, California, U.S.	
6	Win	4–1–1	Ichiro Yamanishi	KO	2 (6)	1993-04-30	Auditorio del Estado, Mexicali, Mexico	
5	Win	3–1–1	Jose Antonio Mulgado	UD	4 (4)	1993-03-05	Auditorio del Estado, Mexicali, Mexico	
4	Loss	2–1–1	Jose Antonio Mulgado	PTS	4 (4)	1993-01-01	Auditorio del Estado, Mexicali, Mexico	
3	Win	2–0–1	Faustino Beltran	UD	4 (4)	1992-10-02	Auditorio del Estado, Mexicali, Mexico	
2	Win	1–0–1	Julio Cesar Patino	KO	1 (4)	1992-09-04	Plaza Cachanilla, Mexicali, Mexico	
1	Draw	0–0–1	Tomas Rivera	PTS	4 (4)	1992-08-07	Plaza Cachanilla, Mexicali, Mexico	

== See also ==
- List of male boxers
- List of Mexican boxing world champions
- List of world flyweight boxing champions

Sporting positions
Regional boxing titles
Vacant Title last held by Raul Juarez	WBC FECARBOX flyweight champion February 4, 2000 – 2000; Vacated	Vacant Title next held by Everardo Morales
World boxing titles
Preceded by Carlos Gabriel Salazar	WBO flyweight champion August 14, 1998 – April 23, 1999	Succeeded by José Antonio López Bueno
