= Hiroshi Kawashima =

Japanese boxer (born 1970)

Personal information
- Nationality: (Japan) Japanese
- Born: Hiroshi Kawashima; March 27, 1970 (age 56) Tokushima Prefecture, Japan
- Weight: Super flyweight

Boxing career
- Stance: Southpaw

Boxing record
- Total fights: 24
- Wins: 20
- Win by KO: 14
- Losses: 3
- Draws: 1
- No contests: 0

Hiroshi Kawashima (Japanese: 川島 郭志; born March 27, 1970) is a former professional boxer. He defended the WBC super flyweight title six times.

== Childhood and early career ==
Kawashima began boxing from an early age under the guidance of his father. His older brother, Shinobu Kawashima, also became a professional boxer, and would later challenge the IBF flyweight title.

Kawashima won the national high school boxing tournament in his senior year, defeating future world champion Katsuya Onizuka in the semi-finals. He moved to Tokyo after graduating from high school, and made his professional debut in August, 1988.

== Professional career ==
Kawashima did not make an ideal start to his career, recording two knockout losses in his first six professional fights. These losses convinced him to improve his defensive skills to cover up for his weak chin, and he became one of the most elusive Japanese boxers ever. He broke his left hand in January 1991 which put him into inactivity for over a year, but he won the Japanese super flyweight title in July 1992 which he defended three times before vacating.

On May 4, 1994, Kawashima challenged WBC and lineal super flyweight champion Jose Luis Bueno, and won by 12 round unanimous decision to become the new world champion. He defeated future IBF champion Carlos Gabriel Salazar in his first defense, and went on to defend his title a total six times.

On February 20, 1997, he faced Gerry Penalosa for his seventh defense, and lost by 12-round split decision. He was forced into retirement after this fight when doctors discovered he had suffered a torn retina. His record was 20-3-1 (14KOs).

Kawashima was overshadowed by the popularity of other Japanese fighters such as Katsuya Onizuka and Joichiro Tatsuyoshi, but conquered his weaknesses to put together a solid professional career.

== After retirement ==
He has frequently appeared as a boxing commentator, after retiring, and in 2005, he founded his own boxing gym in Ōta, Tokyo.

== See also ==
- List of super-flyweight boxing champions
- List of Japanese boxing world champions
- Boxing in Japan

Achievements
Preceded by José Luis Bueno	WBC super flyweight champion May 4, 1994 - February 20, 1997	Succeeded by Gerry Peñalosa
Preceded by José Luis Bueno	Lineal super flyweight champion January 18, 1995 - February 20, 1997	Succeeded by Gerry Peñalosa
