= José Quirino =

Mexican boxer

Personal information
- Nickname: El Gallito
- Born: 19 April 1968 (age 58) Tijuana, Baja California, Mexico
- Height: 1.68 m (5 ft 6 in)
- Weight: Flyweight; Super flyweight

Boxing career
- Reach: 185 cm (73 in)
- Stance: Orthodox

Boxing record
- Total fights: 59
- Wins: 36
- Win by KO: 15
- Losses: 22
- Draws: 1
- No contests: 0

José Quirino (born 19 April 1968) is a Mexican former professional boxer who competed from 1986 to 1997. He held the WBO super flyweight title in 1992.

== Professional career ==
Quirino was not a hard puncher, so he won many of his fights with his speed.

=== WBO super flyweight title ===
Quirino won the WBO super flyweight title by upsetting Puerto Rico's José Ruíz Matos in The Aladdin, Las Vegas, Nevada.

On September 4, 1992, he lost his championship against an undefeated Johnny Bredahl in a very disputed twelve-round decision, in Copenhagen.

=== Legacy ===
Jose was undefeated at 16-0 until he lost his 17th professional fight against Tony "the bazooka" Luca in a highly disputed ten-round fight. José has losses to some of boxing's best fighters like Danny Romero, Michael Carbajal, Mark Johnson, Junior Jones, and Johnny Bredahl. Jose was also nominated as the rookie of the year for Mexico in 1986.

== Personal life ==
Quirino's son, José Jr., went 20–3–3 as a professional boxer before he was shot and killed in Tijuana in 2020.

== See also ==
- List of Mexican boxing world champions
- List of WBO world champions
- List of super flyweight boxing champions

Preceded by José Ruíz Matos	WBO Super Flyweight Champion; 2 February 1992– 4 September 1992	Succeeded by Johnny Bredahl
