= Daniel Jiménez (boxer) =

Puerto Rican boxer (born 1969)

Daniel Jimenez
Personal information
- Nickname: La Cobra ("The Cobra")
- Born: Daniel Jiménez Román; November 21, 1969 (age 56) Camuy, Puerto Rico
- Height: 5 ft 5 1/2 in (166 cm)
- Weight: Bantamweight; Super bantamweight; Featherweight; Super featherweight

Boxing career
- Reach: 71 in (180 cm)
- Stance: Orthodox

Boxing record
- Total fights: 45
- Wins: 30
- Win by KO: 15
- Losses: 13
- Draws: 1
- No contests: 1

Daniel Jiménez Román (born November 21, 1969) is a Puerto Rican former professional boxer who competed from 1988 to 2002. He is a world champion in two weight classes, having held the World Boxing Organization (WBO) junior featherweight title from 1993 to 1995 and the WBO bantamweight title from 1995 to 1996.

== Professional career ==
Jimenez, known as "La Cobra", turned pro in 1988, losing his first fight to Wilfredo Vargas. In 1993, he captured the WBO super bantamweight title with a win over Duke McKenzie. He later defended it four times before losing it to Marco Antonio Barrera in 1995. He moved down in weight after the loss and defeated WBO bantamweight title holder Alfred Kotey by decision. He defended the belt once before losing it to Robbie Regan the following year. He retired in 2002 after several losses late in his career.

On September 3, 1994, Daniel Jiménez established a world record for the quickest knockout in a championship fight, defeating Harald Geier in 17 seconds.

== Professional boxing record ==
44 fights	30 wins	13 losses
By knockout	15	7
By decision	15	6
Draws	1	

No.	Result	Record	Opponent	Type	Round, time	Date	Location	Notes
45	Win	31–12–1 (1)	Edelmiro Martinez	TKO	5 (10)	Aug 30, 2002	Park Theatre, Union City, California, U.S.	
44	Win	30–12–1 (1)	Israel Cortiz	TKO	8 (12)	Aug 17, 2001	Hatillo, Puerto Rico	For WBA Fedecentro super featherweight title
43	Loss	29–12–1 (1)	Jose Quintana	TD	12 (12)	Apr 27, 2001	Hatillo, Puerto Rico	For WBA Fedecentro featherweight title; Majority TD: Jimenez suffered an accidental cut
42	Loss	29–11–1 (1)	Augie Sanchez	TKO	8 (10)	Mar 11, 2001	Feather Falls Casino, Onoville, California, U.S.	
41	Win	29–10–1 (1)	Jose Quintana	PTS	12	Feb 17, 2001	Lares Puerto Rico	For WBA Fedecentro featherweight title
40	Loss	28–10–1 (1)	Daniel Seda	TKO	9 (12)	Nov 11, 2000	Ponce, Puerto Rico	For WBO NABO featherweight title
39	Loss	28–9–1 (1)	Juan Manuel Marquez	RTD	7 (10), 3:00	Aug 27, 2000	Union Plaza Casino, Las Vegas, Nevada, U.S.	
38	Win	28–8–1 (1)	Benjamin Aragon	PTS	10	Apr 29, 2000	St. John’s, Antigua and Barbuda	
37	Loss	27–8–1 (1)	Augie Sanchez	TKO	6 (10), 1:41	Oct 23, 1999	MGM Grand, Las Vegas, Nevada, U.S.	
36	Loss	27–7–1 (1)	Antonio Diaz	UD	10	Sep 27, 1999	Casino Queen, East Saint Louis, Illinois, U.S.	
35	Win	27–6–1 (1)	Martin Gonzalez	TKO	9 (10)	Mar 27, 1999	Guayanilla, Puerto Rico	
34	Loss	26–6–1 (1)	Jorge Eliécer Julio	TKO	9 (12), 2:47	Apr 3, 1998	Coliseo Ruben Rodriguez, Bayamon, Puerto Rico	For WBO bantamweight title
33	Win	26–5–1 (1)	Jose Guadalupe Rangel	TKO	2 (8), 1:42	Nov 22, 1997	Tropicana Hotel and Casino, Las Vegas, Nevada, U.S.	
32	Win	25–5–1 (1)	Nelson Ramon Medina	KO	7 (?)	Jun 14, 1997	Dorado, Puerto Rico	
31	Win	24–5–1 (1)	Rodrigo Valenzuela	PTS	8	Dec 2, 1996	Arrowhead Pond, Anaheim, California, U.S.	
30	Win	23–5–1 (1)	Pedro Angel Rodriguez	UD	12	Jun 22, 1996	Dorado, Puerto Rico	
29	Loss	22–5–1 (1)	Robbie Regan	UD	12	Apr 26, 1996	Welsh Institute of Sport, Cardiff, Wales	Lost WBO bantamweight title
28	Win	22–4–1 (1)	Alejandro Sanabria	KO	5 (?)	Mar 23, 1996	Dorado, Puerto Rico	
27	Win	21–4–1 (1)	Drew Docherty	UD	12	Jan 20, 1996	Mansfield Leisure Centre, Nottinghamshire, London, England	Retained WBO bantamweight title
26	Win	20–4–1 (1)	Alfred Kotey	UD	12	Oct 21, 1995	York Hall, Bethnal Green, London, England	Won WBO bantamweight title
25	Loss	19–4–1 (1)	Marco Antonio Barrera	UD	12	Mar 31, 1995	Arrowhead Pond, Anaheim, California, U.S.	Lost WBO junior featherweight title
24	Win	19–3–1 (1)	Abigail Contreras	TKO	6 (?)	Nov 1, 1994	San Juan, Puerto Rico	
23	Win	18–3–1 (1)	Harald Geier	KO	1 (12), 0:17	Sep 3, 1994	Domplatz, Wiener Neusdadt, Austria	Retained WBO junior featherweight title
22	Win	17–3–1 (1)	Cristobal Pascual	UD	12	Jun 25, 1994	Pabellón Municipal, Utrera, Spain	Retained WBO junior featherweight title
21	Win	16–3–1 (1)	Felix Garcia Losada	UD	12	Jan 7, 1994	Casino de Mallorca, Palma de Mallorca, Spain	Retained WBO junior featherweight title
20	Win	15–3–1 (1)	Juan Diego Perez	TKO	1 (?)	Dec 22, 1993	Hotel Caribe Hilton, Condado, Puerto Rico	
19	Win	14–3–1 (1)	Felix Garcia Losada	TKO	5 (12)	Oct 29, 1993	Pabellón Príncipe Felipe, Zaragoza, Spain	Retained WBO junior featherweight title
18	Win	13–3–1 (1)	Manuel Santiago	TKO	2 (?)	Oct 1, 1993	Camuy, Puerto Rico	
17	Win	12–3–1 (1)	Duke McKenzie	MD	12	Jun 9, 1993	Lewisham Theatre, Lewisham, London, England	Won WBO junior featherweight title
16	Draw	11–3–1 (1)	Miguel Rodriguez	PTS	10	Mar 24, 1993	Hotel Caribe Hilton, Condado, Puerto Rico	
15	Win	11–3 (1)	Dominick Monaco	TKO	6 (?)	Oct 3, 1992	Camuy, Puerto Rico	
14	Win	10–3 (1)	Tyrone Jackson	KO	1 (?)	Jul 18, 1992	San Juan, Puerto Rico	
13	Win	9–3 (1)	Hector Medina	KO	3 (?)	Feb 28, 1992	Camuy, Puerto Rico	
12	NC	8–3 (1)	Hector Medina	NC	2 (8)	Dec 14, 1991	Mayaguez, Puerto Rico	
11	Win	8–3	Angel Vargas	PTS	10	Oct 4, 1991	Mayaguez, Puerto Rico	
10	Win	7–3	Jose Rodriguez	PTS	10	Jun 15, 1991	San Juan, Puerto Rico	
9	Win	6–3	Angel Vargas	PTS	10	May 21, 1991	San Juan, Puerto Rico	
8	Win	5–3	Jose Rodriguez	TKO	3 (?)	Dec 15, 1990	Emilio Huyke Coliseum, Humacao, Puerto Rico	
7	Win	4–3	Miguel Rodriguez	SD	6	Jun 2, 1989	Olympic Auditorium, Miramar, Puerto Rico	
6	Loss	3–3	Pedro Arroyo	PTS	6	Apr 6, 1989	Manati, Puerto Rico	
5	Loss	3–2	Jose Luis De Jesus	PTS	4	Dec 2, 1988	Catano, Puerto Rico	
4	Win	3–1	Evy Vasquez	TKO	1 (?)	Nov 3, 1988	Trujillo Alto, Puerto Rico	
3	Win	2–1	Nelson Matos	PTS	4	Oct 6, 1988	Guaynabo, Puerto Rico	
2	Win	1–1	Julian Gonzalez	PTS	4	Aug 27, 1988	San Juan, Puerto Rico	
1	Loss	0–1	Wilfredo Vargas	KO	3 (4)	Jun 6, 1988	Sands Hotel and Casino, San Juan, Puerto Rico	

== Titles in boxing ==
=== Major world titles ===
- WBO bantamweight champion (118 lbs)
- WBO junior featherweight champion (122 lbs)

== See also ==
- List of Puerto Ricans
- List of Puerto Rican boxing world champions
- List of bantamweight boxing champions
- List of super-bantamweight boxing champions

Sporting positions
World boxing titles
Preceded by Duke McKenzie	WBO super bantamweight champion June 9, 1993 – March 31, 1995	Succeeded by Marco Antonio Barrera
Preceded by Alfred Kotey	WBO bantamweight champion October 21, 1995 – April 26, 1996	Succeeded by Robbie Regan
Records
Preceded by Gerald McClellan vs. Jay Bell; 20 seconds	Fastest knockout in a title bout 17 seconds vs. Harald Geier; September 3, 1994 - November 18, 2017	Succeeded by Zolani Tete vs. Siboniso Gonya; 11 seconds
