= Peter Culshaw =

English boxer (born 1973)

Personal information
- Nickname: The Choirboy
- Nationality: English
- Born: 15 March 1973 (age 53) Liverpool, England
- Height: 5 ft 6 in (168 cm)
- Weight: light flyweight, and fly/super fly/bantam/super bantam/featherweight

Boxing career
- Reach: 69 in (175 cm)
- Stance: Orthodox

Boxing record
- Total fights: 27
- Wins: 24 (KO 12)
- Losses: 2 (KO 1)
- Draws: 1

Peter "The Choirboy" Culshaw (born 15 March 1973 in Liverpool) is Professional boxer, who was former Commonwealth Flyweight Champion and British title challenger. an English amateur light flyweight and professional fly/super fly/bantam/super bantam/featherweight boxer of the 1990s and 2000s, As an amateur he became the youngest senior champion in ABA history when he claimed the flyweight crown in 1990 at the age of 17, you now have to be over 18 to enter, Winning the Amateur Boxing Association of England (ABAE) light flyweight (48 kg) title, against Allan Mooney (Sydney Street ABC), boxing out of Huyton ABC, and as a professional won the British Boxing Board of Control (BBBofC) Central Area flyweight title, World Boxing Union (WBU) International Super Flyweight Title, World Boxing Union (WBU) flyweight title, World Boxing Federation (WBF) super flyweight title, and Commonwealth flyweight title, his professional fighting weight varied from 110 lb (50 kg; 7 st 12 lb), i.e. flyweight to 120 1/4 lb (54.5 kg; 8 st 8.3 lb), i.e. featherweight.
