= Eidy Moya =

Venezuelan boxer (born 1974)

Personal information
- Born: Eidy Moya; September 4, 1974 (age 51) Barcelona, Venezuela
- Height: 5 ft 5 in (165 cm)
- Weight: bantamweight

Boxing career
- Stance: orthodox

Boxing record
- Total fights: 21
- Wins: 17
- Win by KO: 9
- Losses: 3
- Draws: 1
Medal record
Men's amateur boxing
Representing Venezuela
Central American and Caribbean Games
Silver medal – second place	1993 Ponce	Flyweight

Eidy Moya (born 4 September 1974) is a retired boxer who won world titles in the bantamweight weight division.

== Amateur career ==
Moya won seven national championship in different divisions including two juvenile tournaments considered in equal in importance to a Golden Gloves competition. He reportedly compiled a 179–9 record in the amateur background.

In 1992 he defeated by decision 5-0 Colombian Fernando Retayud in the Olympics box-offs that earn him a spot in Barcelona Olympic Games. 1993 was his best amateur year with Moya obtaining two gold medals in South Americans Competitions and finishing with a silver medal in the Central American games held in Puerto Rico.

== Professional career ==
Known as "El Terrible", Moya turned pro in 1994 and defeated Saohin Srithai Condo by decision to capture the interim WBA bantamweight title in 2000. In 2001 he beat Adan Vargas by TKO to capture the vacant WBA bantamweight title. He lost the belt in his first defense by 9th-round KO to Johnny Bredahl in 2002, and retired in 2004 until he came out of retirement in 2017 when he drew against Oswaldo Baron and then defeated Juan Gonzalez in 2018. As of May 2021, he has no scheduled fights.

== Professional boxing record ==
21 fights	17 wins	3 losses
By knockout	9	2
By decision	8	1
Draws	1	

No.	Result	Record	Opponent	Type	Round	Date	Location	Notes
21	Win	17–3–1	Juan Gonzalez	TKO	4 (6)	Mar 10, 2018	Fundacion del Niño, Barcelona, Venezuela	
20	Draw	16–3–1	Oswaldo Baron	MD	4	Dec 21, 2017	Gimnasio Manuel Mota, Los Teques, Venezuela	
19	Win	16–3	Dioberto Julio	UD	8	Dec 3, 2004	Centro de Convenciones Figali, Panama City, Panama	
18	Loss	15–3	Jairo Tagliaferro	KO	10 (10)	May 17, 2003	Centro Recreacional Yesterday, Turmero, Venezuela	
17	Loss	15–2	Johnny Bredahl	KO	9 (12)	Apr 19, 2002	Falconer Centeret, Frederiksberg, Denmark	Lost WBA bantamweight title
16	Win	15–1	Adan Vargas	KO	11 (12)	Oct 14, 2001	Forum Bicentenario, de la Universidad de Aragua, Maracay, Venezuela	Won vacant WBA and IBA bantamweight titles
15	Win	14–1	Anupong Saohin Srisuk	UD	12	Dec 16, 2000	Forum Bicentenario, de la Universidad de Aragua, Maracay, Venezuela	Won WBA interim bantamweight title
14	Win	13–1	Saul Guaza	TKO	1 (10)	Sep 15, 2000	Turmero, Venezuela	
13	Win	12–1	Joel Garcia	TKO	5 (10)	May 21, 2000	Puerto La Cruz, Venezuela	
12	Win	11–1	Elvis Montoya	UD	10	Aug 21, 1999	Ciudad Bolivar, Venezuela	
11	Win	10–1	Diego Andrade	PTS	12	Mar 5, 1999	Barcelona, Venezuela	Retained WBA Fedebol super flyweight title
10	Win	9–1	Edison Torres	PTS	12	Jun 9, 1998	Caracas, Venezuela	Won WBA Fedebol super flyweight title
9	Win	8–1	Antonio Osorio	TKO	6 (10)	Apr 28, 1998	Caracas, Venezuela	
8	Loss	7–1	Félix Machado	UD	10	Sep 27, 1997	Gymnasio Jose Beracasa, Caracas, Venezuela	
7	Win	7–0	An Suk Kim	TKO	3 (8)	Mar 24, 1996	Gwangyang Gymnasium, Gwangyang, South Korea	
6	Win	6–0	Alexis Diaz	TKO	2 (8)	Nov 25, 1995	Marina Bay Hotel, Porlamar, Venezuela	
5	Win	5–0	Euclides Bolivar	TKO	7 (8)	Sep 9, 1995	Porlamar, Venezuela	
4	Win	4–0	Dong Young Kim	KO	1 (6)	Jul 22, 1995	Changchung Gymnasium, Seoul, South Korea	
3	Win	3–0	Edmigio Rujano	UD	4	Mar 11, 1995	La Guaira, Venezuela	
2	Win	2–0	Edmigio Rujano	UD	4	Sep 23, 1994	Maracay, Venezuela	
1	Win	1–0	Gustavo Ascanio	UD	4	Jul 23, 1994	Turmero, Venezuela	

Achievements
New title	WBA Bantamweight champion Interim title December 16, 2000 - October 14, 2001 won full title	Vacant Title next held by Hideki Todaka
Vacant Title last held by Paulie Ayala	WBA Bantamweight Champion; October 14, 2001 - April 19, 2002	Succeeded by Johnny Bredahl
