= Alberto Jiménez-Becerril =

Spanish politician (1960 – 1998)

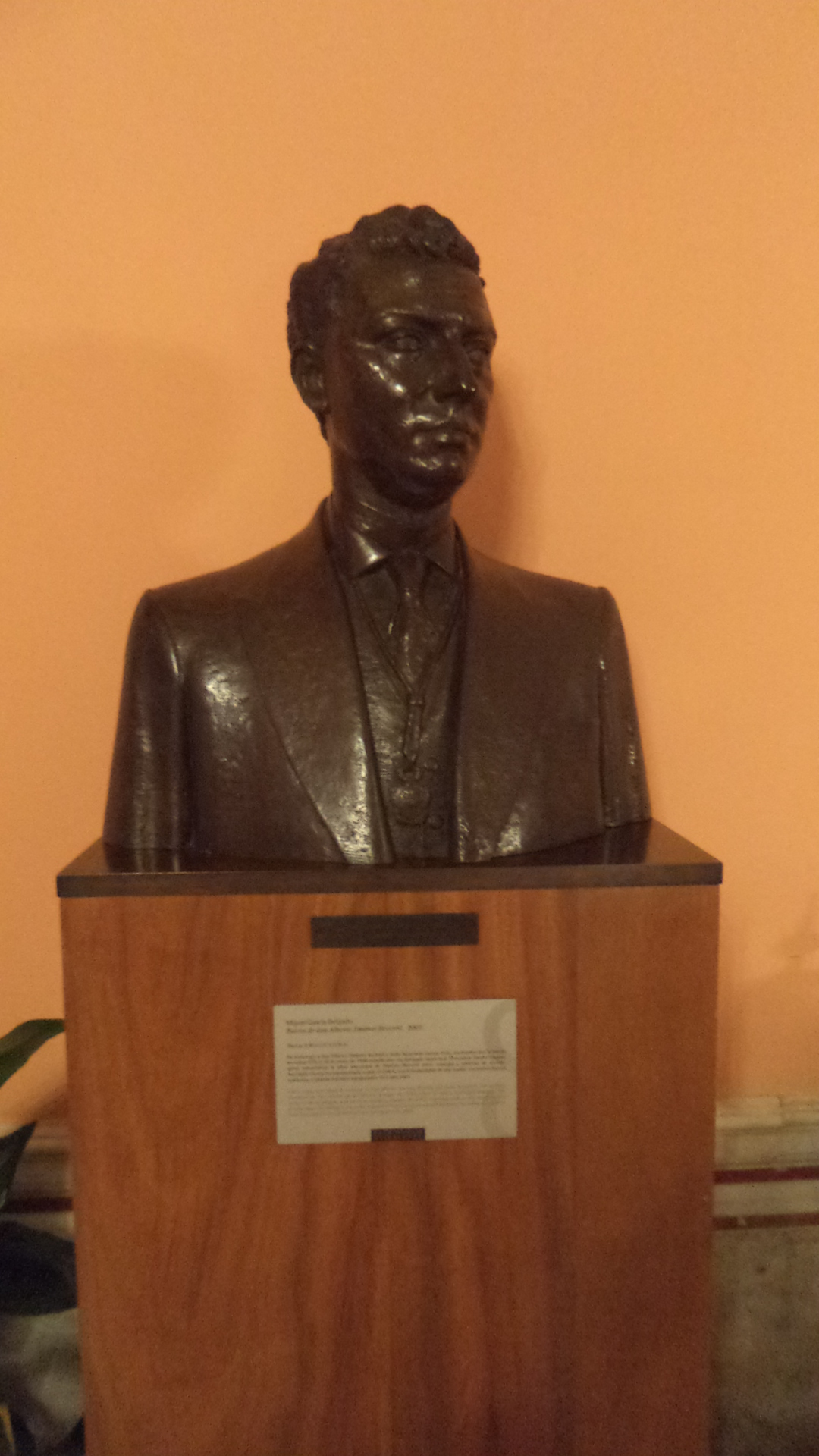

Alberto Jiménez-Becerril Barrio (August 21, 1960 – January 30, 1998) was a Spanish politician of the People's Party (PP) assassinated by the terrorist organization Euskadi Ta Askatasuna (ETA) in 1998.

== Biography ==
Alberto Jiménez-Becerril Barrio was born in Seville and had a degree in law and history. He met his future wife Ascensión at the faculty, where they began their relationship.

He was appointed General Secretary of People's Party of Seville in 1983 and Councillor of Seville in 1987. Jiménez-Becerril was also a deputy of the Parliament of Andalusia, between 1989 and 1990, and he had belonged to Sevilla Club of Fútbol's Executive.

The separatist organization Euskadi Ta Askatasuna (ETA) assassinated Alberto Jiménez-Becerril Barrio and Ascensión García Ortiz in Seville on January 30, 1998. He was murdered at the age of 37. Ascension, Alberto's wife, worked at a law firm as a prosecutor in court. At the time of the murder, he was 39 years old and the couple had three children – four years old, seven years old, and eight years old.

== Death ==
Alberto Jiménez-Becerril was a councillor on the City Council of Seville for twelve years. He was elected through the lists of the People's Party; the party held the mayor's office with Soledad Becerril. He held the positions of Second Lieutenant of the Mayor and Municipal Delegate of the Treasury.

On January 30, 1998, Jiménez-Becerril and his wife, Ascension Garcia Ortiz, a procurator of the Courts of Seville, were killed by an ETA member on the street in the Old Town of Seville when they returned to their domicile around one in the morning. He was 37 years old and had three children between the ages of eight and four at the time of this death.

His murder caused a great consternation in the city and his funeral was attended by 45,000 people. The funeral was presided by Princess Elena.

=== Jimenez Becerril Foundation ===
To perpetuate the memory of the victims, the City Council of Seville promoted the creation of the Alberto Jiménez-Becerril Anti-Terrorism and Violence Foundation which was constituted in December 1999. On March 11, 2014, European Day for the victims of Terrorism, the foundation placed a plaque against terrorism in the bedding of the Plaza of the Incarnation with a quote from Gandhi saying: "There is no path to peace, peace is the path." An olive tree was planted at the same place. On December 28, 2015, they placed another plaque in one of the flowerpots at the crossroads of José Laguillo Street and Arroyo Street. The plaque features poetry about peace and freedom by the poet Enrique Barrero.

=== Legacy ===
The extension of Torneo de Sevilla Street was named after him as Avenida Alberto Jiménez-Becerril. A perpendicular street to the one previously mentioned was named Procurator Ascension Garcia. A stone plaque in memory of the event was placed where the assassination occurred. At the main entrance of Columbus Hall at City Hall, there are two bronze busts of Alberto and Ascension. They also have a tile in their memory on San Jacinto de Triana street.

== See also ==
- (in Spanish) Anex: Asesinatos cometidos por ETA desde la muerte de Francisco Franco

== General ==
- This article makes use of material translated from the corresponding article in the Spanish-language Wikipedia.
- (in Spanish) Biography of Alberto Jiménez-Becerril Barrio in the Anti-Terrorism and Violence Alberto Jiménez-Becerril Foundation webpage
