= Alberto Jiménez (boxer) =

Mexican boxer (born 1969)

Personal information
- Nickname: Ratón
- Born: 8 April 1969 (age 57) Colonia Valle Gómez, Mexico City, Mexico
- Height: 1.57 m (5 ft 2 in)
- Weight: Featherweight; Bantamweight; Flyweight; Light Flyweight

Boxing career
- Reach: 173 cm (68 in)
- Stance: Orthodox

Boxing record
- Total fights: 42
- Wins: 34
- Win by KO: 29
- Losses: 5
- Draws: 3
- No contests: 0

Alberto Jiménez (born 8 April 1969) is a Mexican former professional boxer who competed from 1988 to 2000. He held the WBO flyweight title from 1995 to 1996, making six title defences.

== Professional career ==
In June 1991, Alberto won the Mexican National flyweight title by beating veteran Gonzalo Villalobos.

=== WBC Flyweight Championship ===
In his first world title attempt, he lost a very disputed twelve round majority decision to Muangchai Kittikasem in Lumpinee Boxing Stadium, Bangkok, Thailand.

=== WBO Flyweight Championship ===
On February 11, 1995, Jiménez won the WBO flyweight title by upsetting South Africa's Jacob Matlala with an eighth round T.K.O. in Carousel Casino, Hammanskraal, Gauteng, South Africa.

== See also ==
- List of Mexican boxing world champions
- List of WBO world champions
- List of world flyweight boxing champions

Achievements
Preceded by Jacob Matlala	WBO flyweight champion February 11, 1995 – December 13, 1996	Succeeded by Carlos Gabriel Salazar
