= David Guerault =

French boxer

David Guerault is a French retired professional boxer.

He lost to Johnny Bredahl for the World Boxing Association bantamweight world title.

Guerault was a former European Boxing Union flyweight and bantamweight champion.
