= Francis Ampofo =

Ghanaian/British boxer

Personal information
- Nickname: The Pocket Battleship
- Nationality: Ghanaian; British
- Born: 5 June 1967 (age 59) Kumasi, Ghana
- Height: 5 ft 1 1/2 in (156 cm)
- Weight: Flyweight; Bantamweight

Boxing career
- Reach: 62 in (157 cm)
- Stance: Orthodox

Boxing record
- Total fights: 28
- Wins: 17
- Win by KO: 12
- Losses: 11

Francis "The Pocket Battleship" Ampofo (born 5 June 1967) is a Ghanaian-born British former professional boxer who competed from 1990 to 2002. His family emigrated to the UK when he was a young child, settling in Bethnal Green; his first training in boxing was at the Lion Club in nearby Hoxton. He challenged once for the WBO flyweight title in 1994. At regional level, he held the British flyweight title twice between 1991 and 1994, and the Commonwealth flyweight title twice between 1993 and 1995.

As of 2022, Ampofo owned and operated a chicken farm in the English countryside that produced 2500 eggs per day.
