= Michael Alldis =

British boxer

Personal information
- Nationality: British
- Born: 25 May 1963 (age 63) London, England
- Height: 5 ft 1 in (155 cm)
- Weight: Super bantamweight; featherweight

Boxing career
- Stance: Orthodox

Boxing record
- Total fights: 32
- Wins: 24
- Win by KO: 14
- Losses: 8

Michael Alldis (born 25 May 1968) is a British former professional boxer who competed from 1992 to 2002 and made a comeback in 2015. He challenged once for the IBO super bantamweight title in 1998. At regional level, he held the British super bantamweight title twice between 1999 and 2002 and the Commonwealth super bantamweight title in 2002.
