= Carlos Barreto =

Carlos Barreto may refer to:

- Carlos Barreto (boxer) (1976–1999), Venezuelan boxer
- Carlos Barreto (fighter) (born 1968), Brazilian martial arts fighter
