= Roy Jones Jr. vs. Julio César González =

Boxing match

Roy vs. Julio
- Date: July 28, 2001
- Venue: Staples Center, Los Angeles, California, U.S.
- Title(s) on the line: WBA, WBC, IBF, IBO, NBA and vacant IBA and WBF light heavyweight titles

Tale of the tape
Boxer	Roy Jones Jr.	Julio César González
Nickname	Junior	
Hometown	Pensacola, Florida, U.S.	Guerrero Negro, Baja California Sur, Mexico
Purse	$1,500,000	$500,000
Pre-fight record	44–1 (34 KO)	27–0 (17 KO)
Age	32 years, 6 months	24 years, 11 months
Height	5 ft 11 in (180 cm)	6 ft 2 in (188 cm)
Weight	173 lb (78 kg)	174 1/4 lb (79 kg)
Style	Orthodox	Orthodox
Recognition	WBA WBC, IBF, IBO and NBA; Light Heavyweight Champion; The Ring; No. 1 Ranked Light Heavyweight; The Ring No. 3 ranked pound-for-pound fighter 3-division world champion	WBA; No. 5 Ranked Light Heavyweight; WBC; No. 8 Ranked Light Heavyweight; IBF; No. 10 Ranked Light Heavyweight

Result
- Jones defeats González by unanimous decision

Roy Jones Jr. vs. Julio César González, billed as Roy vs. Julio, was a professional boxing match contested on July 28, 2001, for the unified WBA, WBC, IBF, IBO, IBA, WBF and NBA light heavyweight championship.

== Background ==
Having stopped Derrick Harmon in February 2001 to make the seventh defence in his third reign as Light heavyweight champion (the fourth since unifying all three major belts against Reggie Johnson) Roy Jones Jr. continue to face criticism from some fans and boxing observers for the quality of his opponents. Some defenced Jones by saying that the division lacked other boxers anywhere near his level, while other suggested that he was cherry picking easier opponents and avoiding potential threats. The most muted of these remained Lineal champion Dariusz Michalczewski with whom representatives from HBO had attempted to persuade to come to the US to fight Jones as Jones had repeatedly refused to challenge the champion in Germany saying "I ain't going to Germany to fight no German". Jones had previously avoided facing mandatories Michael Nunn and Graciano Rocchigiani.

Against this backdrop Jones agreed a one fight deal with former promoter Bob Arum for a July bout on PPV in Los Angeles. His opponent was unbeaten Mexican contender Julio César González, who despite not being wildly known had a strong following amongst Hispanics and had achieved record ratings for his previous bout on Univision.

Speaking as the fight was announced González stated that he was ready for best version of Jones saying "The Roy Jones I’m preparing for is the ultimate Roy Jones, the fighter I know he is deep down. He is not my favorite fighter. His style is okay. I mean it won him a championship and everything but I think he’s a little cocky." He also express confidence saying "We are not taking this fight for the money. We are taking this fight because we know we can beat Roy Jones. We took this fight because we know Julio is going to win."

Despite being a 20 to 1 favourite to win, Jones rejected any suggestion that he would be taking González lightly saying "The minute you relax is the minute you lose".

== The fights ==
=== Undercard ===
The untelevised portion of the card saw wins for Mia St. John and Javier Mora. The first televised bout saw 2000 Olympic Lightweight bronze medallist Cristián Bejarano start slowly but stop Lee Willis in the 4th and final round.

=== Lewis vs. Mayorga ===
Roy vs. Julio:Andrew Lewis vs. Ricardo Mayorga
- Title(s) on the line: WBA welterweight title

Tale of the tape
Boxer	Andrew Lewis	Ricardo Mayorga
Nickname	"Six Heads"	"El Matador"
Hometown	Georgetown, Demerara-Mahaica, Guyana	Masaya, Masaya, Nicaragua
Pre-fight record	21–0–1 (19 KO)	22–3–1 (20 KO)
Age	30 years, 7 months	27 years, 9 months
Height	5 ft 8 in (173 cm)	5 ft 9 in (175 cm)
Weight	147 lb (67 kg)	146 3/4 lb (67 kg)
Style	Southpaw	Orthodox
Recognition	WBA; Welterweight Champion	WBA; No. 1 Ranked Welterweight

Result
- No Contest

The first world title bout on the card saw WBA welterweight champion Andrew Lewis face No. 1 contender Ricardo Mayorga.

It was speculated that a victory for Lewis would set up a bout with WBC welterweight champion Shane Mosley, however Lewis played this out saying "Right now I'm concentrating on Mayorga, not on Shane Mosley". The build up was marked by much trash talking including Mayorga brashly promising that he’d end the fight within 4 rounds.

==== The fight ====
The 1st round saw both men throwing hard shots, and while many of Mayorga's punches were wild, two solid lefts landed on Lewis. The champion would end the round with a crisp combination. Just 7 seconds into round 2, Mayorga accidentally head-butted Lewis causing a bad gash on Lewis’ left eyelid. Referee Marty Denkin immediately stopped the bout and had the ringside doctor examine the cut and it was quickly determined he could not continue. As such the bout was ruled a no contest.

==== Aftermath ====
Speaking after the fight Lewis said "I'm disappointed the fight didn't go longer, but I will give him a rematch." His manager Nelson Fernandez would describe Mayorga as "like a billy goat".

Preceded by vs. Larry Marks	Andrew Lewis's bouts 28 July 2001	Succeeded by Rematch
Preceded by vs. Elias Cruz	Ricardo Mayorga's bouts 28 July 2001	Succeeded by Rematch

=== Cotto vs. Rodríguez ===
The following bout saw unbeaten light welterweight prospect Miguel Cotto face durable journeyman Arturo Rodríguez.

==== The fight ====
Cotto would make light work of Rodríguez dropping him twice in the 2nd round, the 2nd of which came after a double left hook. Rodríguez did not wish to continue and Cotto was awarded the KO victory.

==== Aftermath ====
Shortly after this bout Cotto suffered a dangerous injury that threatened to derail his promising boxing career. As he was driving to the gymnasium at 5am, he apparently fell asleep and crashed, breaking his arm and requiring hospitalization.

Preceded by vs. Rudolfo Lunsford	Miguel Cotto's bouts 28 July 2001	Succeeded by vs. Joshua Smith
Preceded by vs. Alvaro Clinton Ayala	Arturo Rodríguez's bouts 28 July 2001	Succeeded by vs. Arturo Morales

=== Morales vs. Chi ===
Roy vs. Julio:Erik Morales vs. In-Jin Chi
- Title(s) on the line: WBC featherweight title

Tale of the tape
Boxer	Erik Morales	In-Jin Chi
Nickname	"El Terrible"	
Hometown	Tijuana, Baja California, Mexico	Seoul, Gyeonggi, South Korea
Pre-fight record	40–0 (28 KO)	24–1 (14 KO)
Age	24 years, 10 months	28 years
Height	5 ft 8 in (173 cm)	5 ft 7 in (170 cm)
Weight	126 lb (57 kg)	125 1/2 lb (57 kg)
Style	Orthodox	Orthodox
Recognition	WBC; Featherweight Champion; 2-division world champion	WBC; No. 1 Ranked Featherweight

Result
- Morales defeats Chi by unanimous decision

The chief support saw WBC featherweight champion face No. 1 challenger In-Jin Chi. Chi was attempting to end a streak of 24 losses in a row by South Korean boxers in world championship fights.

==== The fight ====
The bout was an entertaining slugfest with both men having their moments. Morales started strong snapping Chi's head of back with a right-left-right combination in the first round, before Chi hurt Morales with a right hand in the 2nd round. In the 6th, Morales suffered a cut over his left eye from an accidental headbutt causing referee Jose Cobian to pause the action while the ringside doctor examined the cut to ensure that Morales could continue. Chi was penalized one point for excess holding in 10th, having been warned about fouls earlier on. Chi would come out firing in the final round throwing 100 punches in an attempt to finish strong.

At the end of 12 rounds all three judges scored the bout for Morales 117-110, 116-112 and 116-111. HBO's unofficial ringside scorer Harold Lederman scored the fight 116–111 and Dan Rafael of USA Today had it 116–112 both for Morales.

According to CompuBox, Morales outlanded Chi with the champion connecting with 213 of 645 punches thrown (a 33.0% connect rate) against Chi landing 173 of 641 (a 27.0% connect rate).

==== Aftermath ====
Speaking after the bout Chi called for a rematch saying "I did my best. I deserve to fight Morales one more time."

Preceded by vs. Guty Espadas Jr.	Erik Morales's bouts 28 July 2001	Succeeded by vs. Marco Antonio Barrera II
Preceded by vs. Donnie Olivetti	In-Jin Chi's bouts 28 July 2001	Succeeded by vs. Samuel Duran

=== Main Event ===
Halfway through the opening round a quick left hook to the head dropped González. He beat the count and fought back backing the champion into the ropes and landing body shots which Jones countered with a number of uppercuts that snapped the challenger's head back. González would press the action in the next two rounds, but Jones would begin to use his speed to take control of the action. A left hook early in the 5th sent González to the canvas for the second time, he beat the count but appeared hurt. Nevertheless despite Jones teeing off on González with lead rights for much of the rest of the round he couldn't finish off the challenger, who was able to force Jones back on to the rope late on in the round. González would appear frustrated as the bout progressed as Jones choose to box cautiously for the next few round drawing the crowd's ire at the times as he would pick apart González with counter shots. There was a furry of action at the end of the 9th with González landing a sneakily left hook just before the bell, prompting Jones to wink at his corner. In the final minute of the bout Jones landed a right cross that sent González down for the third time, he again rose but appeared very hurt. Both men continued to exchange before a left hook to the head had González knocked off balance, despite appearing to be to shaky legs he survived to the final bell

At the end of 12 rounds, Jones was awarded a wide 119–106 on two judges' scorecards and 118–107 on the other.

HBO's unofficial ringside scorer Harold Lederman scored the fight 119–107 and Dan Rafael of USA Today had it both 117–108 for Jones.

According to CompuBox, Jones landed 192 of 375 punches (51.2%) whilst González connected on just 91 of 609 (14.9%).

== Aftermath ==
Speaking after the bout Jones said "I felt good, my hands are a little tender. There were times I hurt myself when I hurt him. That's why I had to back off sometimes." He also praised his opponent saying "He's stronger when he comes back from a knockdown. He had great recovery ability. He was strong, and he had heart. I had to wear him down."

González meanwhile made no excuses saying "Quick, strong; however you want to put it, he beat me. I thought I could hurt him. I pushed him back. I connected with a couple of punches. I didn't hurt him. He hurt me." He also get emotional saying "They can say all they want about me going 12 rounds with the best boxer in the world, but I still don't feel good about this loss. It hurts. I prepared myself to win, but obviously I couldn't do it. He was very fast, and he surprised me every time he knocked me down. I didn't see the punches coming."

At the post-fight news conference Jones expressed a desire to face the winner of the upcoming undisputed middleweight showdown between Bernard Hopkins and Félix Trinidad, claiming that he was "pulling for Trinidad like a high school cheerleader."

== Undercard ==
Confirmed bouts:

Winner	Loser	Weight division/title belt(s) disputed	Result
(Mexico) Erik Morales	(South Korea) In Jin Chi	WBC World Featherweight title	Unanimous decision
(Puerto Rico) Miguel Cotto	(Mexico) Arturo Rodríguez	Light welterweight (6 rounds)	2nd round KO
(Guyana) Andrew Lewis	(Nicaragua) Ricardo Mayorga	WBA World Welterweight title	No Contest
(Mexico) Cristián Bejarano	(United States) Lee Willis	Light welterweight (4 rounds)	4th round KO
Preliminary bouts
(Mexico) Carlos Urias Guerena	(United States) Lemuel Nelson	Light welterweight (8 rounds)	Split decision
(United States) Mia St. John	(Mexico) Imelda Arias	Light welterweight (4 rounds)	Majority Draw
(Mexico) Javier Mora	(United States) Bradley Rone	Heavyweight (4 rounds)	Unanimous decision

== Broadcasting ==
Country	Broadcaster
United Kingdom	Sky Sports
United States	HBO

Preceded by vs. Derrick Harmon	Roy Jones Jr.'s bouts 28 July 2001	Succeeded by vs. Glen Kelly
Preceded by vs. Konstantin Semerdjiev	Julio César González's bouts 28 July 2001	Succeeded by vs. Tyrone Armstead
