= Takashi Koshimoto =

Japanese boxer (born 1971)

Takashi Koshimoto 越本 隆志
Personal information
- Nationality: Japanese
- Born: January 5, 1971 (age 55) Fukuoka, Japan
- Height: 5 ft 9 1/2 in (177 cm)
- Weight: Featherweight

Boxing career
- Stance: Southpaw

Boxing record
- Total fights: 43
- Wins: 39
- Win by KO: 17
- Losses: 2
- Draws: 2

Takashi Koshimoto (越本 隆志, Koshimoto Takashi; born January 5, 1971, in Fukuoka) is a former Japanese professional boxer in the featherweight (126 lb) division. He is a former WBC world featherweight champion.

== Childhood and early career ==
Koshimoto's parents divorced shortly after he was born, and Koshimoto was raised single-handedly by his father. He played baseball during his early teens, but took up boxing when his father founded a boxing gym in his local town. His father would be his trainer throughout his amateur and professional career. His amateur record was 6-6 (6 RSC).

== Professional career ==
Koshimoto made his debut in November 1992. In 1996, he won the Japanese featherweight title, which he defended 6 times before returning.

In January, 2001, he challenged Freddie Norwood for the WBA featherweight title, but lost by 9th-round TKO. This was his first professional loss. Later that year, he won the OPBF featherweight title, which he defended 7 times before returning.

Koshimoto got his second world title shot on January 29, 2006, fighting WBC featherweight champion Injin Chi. He won by 12-round decision, becoming the oldest Japanese boxer to win a world title, at 35 years of age. Koshimoto was paid almost nothing for the fight, since his gym had funded all the money needed for the title match.

On July 30, 2006, he fought WBC Youth Champion Rodolfo López for his first defense, losing by 7th-round TKO. Koshimoto was hospitalized after the fight, and promptly announced his retirement. His record was 39-2-2 (17KOs).

== Professional boxing record ==
43 fights	39 wins	2 losses
By knockout	17	2
By decision	22	0
Draws	2	

No.	Result	Record	Opponent	Type	Round, time	Date	Location	Notes
43	Loss	39–2–2	Rodolfo López	TKO	7 (12)	2006-07-30	Marine Messe, Fukuoka, Japan	Lost WBC featherweight title
42	Win	39–1–2	Chi In-jin	SD	12 (12)	2006-01-29	Kyuden Gym, Fukuoka, Japan	Won WBC featherweight title
41	Win	38–1–2	Achhan Buahom	UD	10 (10)	2005-05-29	Yurix, Munakata, Japan	
40	Win	37–1–2	Jeffrey Onate	KO	9 (12)	2005-01-30	Yurix, Munakata, Japan	Retained OPBF featherweight title
39	Win	36–1–2	Seung Kon Chae	UD	12 (12)	2004-08-08	Yurix, Munakata, Japan	Retained OPBF featherweight title
38	Win	35–1–2	Amorn Longsiriphoom	UD	10 (10)	2004-04-04	Yurix, Munakata, Japan	
37	Win	34–1–2	Ratanasak Saktawee	TKO	4 (10)	2003-12-14	Yurix, Munakata, Japan	
36	Win	33–1–2	Chookiet Sangsi	KO	3 (12)	2003-08-03	Yurix, Munakata, Japan	Retained OPBF featherweight title
35	Win	32–1–2	Jaime Barcelona	SD	12 (12)	2003-03-23	Yurix, Munakata, Japan	Retained OPBF featherweight title
34	Win	31–1–2	Jeffrey Onate	UD	12 (12)	2002-10-13	Yurix, Munakata, Japan	Retained OPBF featherweight title
33	Win	30–1–2	Toshikage Kimura	UD	12 (12)	2002-05-11	Korakuen Hall, Tokyo, Japan	Retained OPBF featherweight title
32	Win	29–1–2	Chookiet Sangsi	UD	12 (12)	2002-02-10	Yurix, Munakata, Japan	Retained OPBF featherweight title
31	Win	28–1–2	Donny Suratin	MD	12 (12)	2001-09-30	Yurix, Munakata, Japan	Won vacant OPBF featherweight title
30	Win	27–1–2	Hino KiatthorborUbol	UD	10 (10)	2001-04-15	Yurix, Munakata, Japan	
29	Win	26–1–2	Baby Lorona Jr	TD	10 (10)	2000-11-03	Acción, Fukuoka, Japan	
28	Win	25–1–2	Dodong Sales	UD	10 (10)	2000-07-30	Yurix, Munakata, Japan	
27	Win	24–1–2	Jong Bum Lee	TKO	6 (10)	2000-04-30	Yurix, Munakata, Japan	
26	Loss	23–1–2	Freddie Norwood	KO	9 (12)	2000-01-30	International Center, Fukuoka, Japan	For WBA featherweight title
25	Win	23–0–2	Suk Hwi Jo	TKO	4 (10)	1999-10-10	Yurix, Munakata, Japan	
24	Win	22–0–2	Dodong Basalo	TKO	6 (10)	1999-07-18	Yurix, Munakata, Japan	
23	Win	21–0–2	Junichi Nakamura	TKO	7 (10)	1999-03-14	Yurix, Munakata, Japan	Retained Japanese featherweight title
22	Win	20–0–2	Jun Tanigawa	UD	10 (10)	1998-12-06	Yurix, Munakata, Japan	Retained Japanese featherweight title
21	Win	19–0–2	Toshikage Kimura	TKO	9 (10)	1998-08-16	Yurix, Munakata, Japan	Retained Japanese featherweight title
20	Win	18–0–2	Garry Garay	KO	4 (10)	1998-05-05	Hakata Star Lane, Fukuoka, Japan	
19	Win	17–0–2	Atsushi Hagiwara	SD	10 (10)	1998-02-15	Yurix, Munakata, Japan	Retained Japanese featherweight title
18	Win	16–0–2	Junichi Nakamura	MD	10 (10)	1997-10-05	Yurix, Munakata, Japan	Retained Japanese featherweight title
17	Draw	15–0–2	Junichi Nakamura	TD	4 (10)	1997-03-20	Yurix, Munakata, Japan	Retained Japanese featherweight title
16	Win	15–0–1	Atsushi Tamaki	TKO	8 (10)	1996-11-04	Shirahama Hall, Wakayama, Japan	Won vacant Japanese featherweight title
15	Win	14–0–1	Ric Ramirez	KO	1 (10)	1996-06-23	Yurix, Munakata, Japan	
14	Win	13–0–1	Erwin Gonzales	PTS	10 (10)	1996-03-17	Hakata Star Lane, Fukuoka, Japan	
13	Win	12–0–1	Jun Aguilan	PTS	10 (10)	1995-11-23	Yurix, Munakata, Japan	
12	Win	11–0–1	Style Adigue	KO	8 (10)	1995-08-13	City Gymnasium, Tagawa, Japan	
11	Win	10–0–1	Style Adigue	PTS	10 (10)	1995-03-26	Yurix, Munakata, Japan	
10	Win	9–0–1	Jerry Maamo	KO	1 (10)	1994-12-18	City Gymnasium, Tagawa, Japan	
9	Win	8–0–1	Miko Adalim	PTS	10 (10)	1994-09-15	Yurix, Munakata, Japan	
8	Win	7–0–1	Han Jin Kim	TKO	2 (8)	1994-05-29	City Gymnasium, Tagawa, Japan	
7	Win	6–0–1	Shinya Kiuchi	PTS	6 (6)	1994-02-13	Prefectural Gymnasium, Osaka, Japan	
6	Win	5–0–1	Osamu Nagaishi	PTS	6 (6)	1993-12-14	Prefectural Gymnasium, Osaka, Japan	
5	Win	4–0–1	Kazutoshi Nioka	PTS	6 (6)	1993-11-04	Auditorium, Nagoya, Japan	
4	Win	3–0–1	Keisuke Nishide	KO	2 (4)	1993-08-29	City Gymnasium, Iizuka, Japan	
3	Win	2–0–1	Kario Wada	KO	1 (4)	1993-04-11	City Gymnasium, Tagawa, Japan	
2	Draw	1–0–1	Takahiko Fukuda	PTS	4 (4)	1992-12-27	Yurix, Munakata, Japan	
1	Win	1–0	Masatoshi Fujioka	KO	1 (4)	1992-11-03	Hakata Star Lane, Fukuoka, Japan	

== Post-retirement ==
His father and trainer, Hidetake Koshimoto, was head of the Fukuoka Boxing Gym, and he replaced his father after his retirement. He currently trains aspiring boxers at the gym.

== See also ==
- List of southpaw stance boxers
- Boxing in Japan
- List of Japanese boxing world champions
- List of world featherweight boxing champions

Sporting positions
Regional boxing titles
Vacant Title last held by Kōji Matsumoto	Japanese featherweight champion November 4, 1996 – 1999; Vacated	Vacant Title next held by Toshikage Kimura
Vacant Title last held by Panther Yanagida	OPBF featherweight champion September 30, 2001 – 2005; Vacated	Vacant Title next held by Hiroyuki Enoki
World boxing titles
Preceded by Chi In-jin	WBC featherweight champion January 29, 2006 – July 30, 2006	Succeeded by Rodolfo López
