= Clarence Adams (boxer) =

American boxer

Personal information
- Nickname: Bones
- Born: Clarence Richard Adams; July 6, 1974 (age 52) Henderson, Kentucky, U.S.
- Height: 5 ft 5 1/2 in (1.7 m)
- Weight: Super bantamweight Featherweight

Boxing career
- Reach: 5 ft 7 in (1.70 m)
- Stance: Orthodox

Boxing record
- Total fights: 56
- Wins: 44
- Win by KO: 20
- Losses: 7
- Draws: 4
- No contests: 1

Clarence Richard Adams (born July 6, 1974) is an American former professional boxer. He has won a world title in the Super Bantamweight weight division.

== Early life ==
Adams was born in Henderson, Kentucky.

== Professional career ==
Adams turned pro in 1990, at the age of 16. In 2000 defeated Néstor Garza for the WBA super bantamweight title by unanimous decision. In his first defense he beat Andres Fernandez by 6th-round TKO. The fight ended when the referee stopped the fight and the ringside physician, Armando Sanchez, determined that Fernandez could not continue due to cuts.

Adams defended the title one more time before vacating to fight Paulie Ayala. He lost the bout by split decision in 2001, and also lost a rematch in 2002. Adams retired in 2003 after drawing with journeyman Manuel Sepeda, but returned to boxing in 2006. On June 12, 2009, Adams defeated veteran Alex "Ali" Baba in an 8th-round TKO.

His last match was in 2010, a fourth-round technical knockout loss to Edel Ruiz, which brought Adams' record to 44–7–4 with 20 knockouts and 1 no contest.

In 2015, Adams was ordered to spend half a year behind bars after pleading guilty to being part of a group of people involved with drug trafficking, fraud and prostitution. Adams, who was a driver for the limousine company accused of the criminal activity, "admitted to playing a small role in the prostitution and drug dealing portions of the scheme."

Adams now owns Bones Adams Gym in Las Vegas, a boxing training center. He played a key role in helping Blair Cobbs becoming a professional boxer. As of September 2021, Adams is now training Amir Khan's first-ever signing and protege, Tal Singh, a former England amateur champion, who he is hoping to guide towards a historic world title triumph. Adams also trains Shane Mosley Jr. in his Las Vegas gym.

Achievements
Preceded by Néstor Garza	WBA Super Bantamweight Champion; March 4, 2000 – July 3, 2001; Stripped	Vacant Title next held by Yober Ortega
