= Artyom Simonyan =

Armenian boxer

Medal record

Men's Boxing

Representing Armenia

European Championships
Silver medal – second place	1998 Minsk	Featherweight

World Cup
Bronze medal – third place	1998 Beijing	Featherweight

Artyom Simonyan (Armenian: Արտյոմ Սիմոնյան; born December 27, 1975, in Yerevan, Armenia) is an Armenian amateur boxer.

== Amateur career ==
Simonyan won a silver medal at the 1998 European Amateur Boxing Championships in the featherweight division and a bronze medal at the 1998 Boxing World Cup in the featherweight division.

== Professional career ==
Simonyan amassed a record of 13-0-1 (7 KO) from 2000 to 2003 and won the USBA Super Bantamweight title. He then won an IBF Super Bantamweight Title Eliminator and challenged Israel Vázquez for the IBF Super Bantamweight Championship. Simonyan lost via fifth round technical knockout. He later retired with a record of 15-3-2 (7 KO).

== Professional boxing record ==
20 fights	15 wins	3 losses
By knockout	7	3
By decision	8	0
Draws	2	

No.	Result	Record	Opponent	Type	Round, time	Date	Location	Notes
20	Loss	15–3–2	Rogers Mtagwa	KO	4 (12), 1:58	16 Jun 2006	New Alhambra, Philadelphia, Pennsylvania, U.S.	For IBF-USBA featherweight title
19	Draw	15–2–2	Fred Neal	UD	8	2 Feb 2006	Henry Fonda Theater, Los Angeles, California, U.S.	
18	Win	15–2–1	Gilberto Sánchez León	UD	8	4 Nov 2005	Quiet Cannon, Montebello, California, U.S.	
17	Loss	14–2–1	Agapito Sánchez	TKO	5 (12), 1:30	22 Jul 2005	Allstate Arena, Rosemont, Illinois, U.S.	Lost IBF-USBA super-bantamweight title
16	Loss	14–1–1	Israel Vázquez	TKO	5 (12), 0:59	28 Dec 2004	Sycuam Resort & Casino, El Cajon, California, U.S.	For IBF super-bantamweight title
15	Win	14–0–1	Fahsan 3K Battery	UD	12	21 May 2004	The Belvedere, Elk Grove, Illinois, U.S.	
14	Win	13–0–1	Carlos Contreras	UD	12	26 Jul 2003	Sam's Town Casino, Tunica, Mississippi, U.S.	Won vacant IBF-USBA super-bantamweight title
13	Win	12–0–1	Ablorh Sowah	TKO	6 (10), 2:56	15 Mar 2003	UIC Pavilion, Chicago, Illinois, U.S.	
12	Win	11–0–1	Radford Beasley	TKO	7 (10), 3:00	13 Dec 2002	Pechanga Resort Casino, Temecula, California, U.S.	
11	Win	10–0–1	Mario Camarena	UD	4	6 Sep 2002	Crystal Park Casino, Compton, California, U.S.	
10	Win	9–0–1	Jacobo Gomez	KO	6 (10), 1:46	6 Jun 2002	Quiet Cannon, Montebello, California, U.S.	
9	Win	8–0–1	Julio Alberto Leal	UD	6	19 Apr 2002	Quiet Cannon, Montebello, California, U.S.	
8	Draw	7–0–1	David Vasquez	MD	6	12 Jan 2002	Cox Pavilion, Paradise, Nevada, U.S.	
7	Win	7–0	Juan Carlos Martínez	UD	6	16 Nov 2001	Quiet Cannon, Montebello, California, U.S.	
6	Win	6–0	Freddy Castro	TKO	1 (6), 2:08	14 Sep 2001	Quiet Cannon, Montebello, California, U.S.	
5	Win	5–0	Mynor Vásquez	TKO	1 (4), 2:22	28 Jun 2001	Marriott Hotel, Irvine, California, U.S.	
4	Win	4–0	Brad Timm	TKO	1	25 May 2001	Mystic Lake Casino, Prior Lake, Minnesota, U.S.	
3	Win	3–0	Juan Rafael Gutiérrez	UD	4	26 Apr 2001	Marriott Hotel, Irvine, California, U.S.	
2	Win	2–0	Alejandro Lopez	UD	4	7 Jan 2001	Texas Station Casino, North Las Vegas, Nevada, U.S.	
1	Win	1–0	Johannes Musa	TKO	4 (4), 2:40	30 Nov 2000	Hollywood Park Casino, Inglewood, California, U.S.	
