= Yober Ortega =

Venezuelan boxer

Personal information
- Nationality: Venezuelan
- Born: Yober Ortega; August 21, 1965 (age 60)
- Height: 5 ft 7 in (170 cm)
- Weight: super bantamweight; featherweight

Boxing career
- Stance: Southpaw

Boxing record
- Total fights: 44
- Wins: 35
- Win by KO: 24
- Losses: 6
- Draws: 3
- No contests: 0

Yober Ortega (born August 21, 1965) is a retired boxer from Venezuela who was a former WBA super bantamweight champion.

== Professional boxing record ==
44 fights	35 wins	6 losses
By knockout	24	0
By decision	11	6
Draws	3	

No.	Result	Record	Opponent	Type	Round, time	Date	Location	Notes
44	Loss	35–6–3	Thomas Mashaba	UD	12	24 Mar 2006	Emnotweni Casino, Nelspruit, South Africa	For IBO featherweight title
43	Loss	35–5–3	Celestino Caballero	UD	12	15 Oct 2005	Centro de Convenciones Figali, Panama City, Panama	For vacant WBA interim super bantamweight title
42	Win	35–4–3	Ernesto Vásquez Batioja	UD	10	2 May 2005	Centro Recreacional Yesterday, Turmero, Venezuela	
41	Win	34–4–3	Junichi Watanabe	TKO	2 (10), 2:56	23 May 2004	Kose Sports Park, Kōfu, Japan	
40	Draw	33–4–3	Daniel Kodjo Sassou	PTS	6	16 Dec 2003	Palais des sports Marcel-Cerdan, Paris, France	
39	Win	33–4–2	Francisco Mateos	KO	3 (10)	11 Oct 2003	Karibe Convention Center, Pétion-Ville, Haiti	
38	Draw	32–4–2	Tuncay Kaya	PTS	6	4 Jul 2003	Futuroscope, Poitiers, France	
37	Loss	32–4–1	Yoddamrong Sithyodthong	UD	12	21 Feb 2001	Wat Temple Banrai, Nakhon Ratchasima, Thailand	Lost WBA super bantamweight title
36	Win	32–3–1	José Rojas	KO	4 (12), 0:36	17 Nov 2001	Mandalay Bay, Paradise, Nevada, U.S.	Won vacant WBA super bantamweight title
35	Win	31–3–1	Kozo Ishii	TKO	11 (12), 1:45	23 Nov 2000	Rainbow Hall, Nagoya, Japan	Won vacant WBA interim super bantamweight title
34	Win	30–3–1	Ever García Hernández	TKO	5	18 Jun 2000	San Juan de los Morros, Guárico, Venezuela	
33	Win	29–3–1	Vladislav Antonov	UD	12	31 Jan 2000	Palais des Sports Porte de Versailles, Paris, France	
32	Loss	28–3–1	Antonio Cermeño	MD	12	9 Oct 1999	Gimnasio José Beracasa, Caracas, Venezuela	For vacant WBA interim super bantamweight title
31	Win	28–2–1	Fernando Blanco	TKO	8	27 Mar 1999	Turmero, Aragua, Venezuela	
30	Win	27–2–1	Jorge Soto	TKO	7	19 Dec 1998	Palo Verde, Sucre, Venezuela	
29	Win	26–2–1	Miguel Ángel Escamilla	PTS	12	3 Oct 1998	Gimnasio José Beracasa, Caracas, Venezuela	Won inaugural NABA super bantamweight title
28	Win	25–2–1	Antonio Osorio	TKO	7	7 Jul 1998	Guatire, Miranda, Venezuela	
27	Win	24–2–1	Juan García	KO	6 (10)	16 May 1998	Gimnasio Alexis Argüello, Managua, Nicaragua	
26	Win	23–2–1	José Luis Valbuena	UD	12	5 May 1997	Turmero, Aragua, Venezuela	Won Venezuelan super bantamweight title
25	Win	22–2–1	Elvis Montoya	KO	3	11 Nov 1996	Turmero, Aragua, Venezuela	
24	Loss	21–2–1	Antonio Cermeño	UD	12	23 Mar 1996	Miami Arena, Miami, Florida, U.S.	For WBA super bantamweight title
23	Win	21–1–1	Ramón Guzmán	TKO	2 (12)	25 Nov 1995	Marina Bay Hotel, Porlamar, Venezuela	Won vacant WBA Fedelatin super bantamweight title
22	Win	20–1–1	José Rincónes	TKO	7	12 Aug 1995	Margarita Island, Nueva Esparta, Venezuela	
21	Win	19–1–1	Luis Ojeda	TKO	9 (12)	1 Apr 1995	Caracas, Venezuela	Won vacant Venezuelan super bantamweight title
20	Win	18–1–1	Ismael Rondón	TKO	4	9 Sep 1994	Caracas, Venezuela	
19	Win	17–1–1	Frank Franco	TKO	5	8 Aug 1994	Turmero, Aragua, Venezuela	
18	Win	16–1–1	Edgar Mendoza	KO	1	29 Apr 1994	Turmero, Aragua, Venezuela	
17	Win	15–1–1	Ricardo Romero	KO	2	26 Kar 1994	Los Ruices, Sucre, Venezuela	
16	Win	14–1–1	José Español	TKO	5	11 Dec 1993	Caracas, Venezuela	
15	Win	13–1–1	Aldrin Sosa	PTS	10	2 Oct 1993	Caracas, Venezuela	
14	Win	12–1–1	Aldrin Sosa	PTS	10	12 Jun 1993	Caracas, Venezuela	
13	Win	11–1–1	Edgar Rodríguez	KO	8	27 Mar 1993	Caracas, Venezuela	
12	Loss	10–1–1	Nelson Ramón Medina	PTS	8	3 Mar 1993	Caracas, Venezuela	
11	Win	10–0–1	José Molina	PTS	8	19 Dec 1992	Turmero, Aragua, Venezuela	
10	Win	9–0–1	Candelario Sánchez	TKO	4	3 Oct 1992	Porlamar, Nueva Esparta, Venezuela	
9	Win	8–0–1	Alfredo Aponte	PTS	8	27 Jun 1992	Turmero, Aragua, Venezuela	
8	Win	7–0–1	Antonio Osorio	TKO	5	20 Jun 1992	Turmero, Aragua, Venezuela	
7	Win	6–0–1	Ricardo Romero	PTS	6	23 Nov 1991	Turmero, Aragua, Venezuela	
6	Win	5–0–1	Ismael Rondón	PTS	8	20 Sep 1991	Caracas, Venezuela	
5	Win	4–0–1	Danny Sandoval	TKO	4	7 Jul 1991	Turmero, Aragua, Venezuela	
4	Win	3–0–1	Jesús Torres	TKO	2	15 Jun 1991	Turmero, Aragua, Venezuela	
3	Win	2–0–1	José Molina	TKO	5	27 Apr 1991	Turmero, Aragua, Venezuela	
2	Draw	1–0–1	Douglas Quiaro	PTS	4	30 Oct 1990	Caracas, Venezuela	
1	Win	1–0	Fabián Salazar	PTS	4	15 Sep 1990	Turmero, Aragua, Venezuela	

Achievements
Vacant Title last held by Antonio Cermeno	WBA Super Bantamweight Champion; Interim Title; November 23, 2000 – November 17, 2001; Won full title	Vacant Title next held by Celestino Caballero
Vacant Title last held by Clarence Adams	WBA Super Bantamweight Champion; November 17, 2001 – February 21, 2002	Succeeded by Yoddamrong Sithyodthong
