= Chi In-jin =

South Korean boxer (born 1973)

Personal information
- Nationality: South Korean
- Born: 지인진; July 18, 1973 (age 52) Seoul, South Korea
- Height: 5 ft 7 in (170 cm)
- Weight: Bantamweight; Super bantamweight; Featherweight

Boxing career
- Reach: 67 in (170 cm)
- Stance: Orthodox

Boxing record
- Total fights: 35
- Wins: 31
- Win by KO: 18
- Losses: 3
- Draws: 1

Chi In-jin (Korean: 지인진; Hanja: 池仁珍, born July 18, 1973) is a South Korean former professional boxer who competed from 1991 to 2006. He held the WBC featherweight title twice between 2004 and 2007.

== Career ==
=== Boxing ===
Chi was born in Seoul and made his debut as a professional boxer on November 20, 1991. After losing his pro debut, he went unbeaten in his next 24 bouts. He challenged WBC Featherweight Title holder Erik Morales on July 28, 2001, but lost a unanimous decision. On October 18, 2003, the Chi got another shot at the vacant WBC featherweight title against Michael Brodie, but came up short of the title with a draw. In the rematch the following year, he knocked out Brodie in the 7th round. After defending the title twice, he lost the belt to Takashi Koshimoto in 2006 via split decision.

Chi recaptured the WBC featherweight title with a unanimous decision over defending titlist Rodolfo López at the Chungmu Art Hall in Seoul, Korea, in December 2006. Scores were 117–111, 116–112 and 116–113. Koshimoto had been defeated by Lopez in his first defense, yielding the belt to Lopez before it was regained by Chi.

=== Kickboxing ===
On July 31, 2007, Chi announced he was vacating his WBC title and was instead going to participate in K-1 kickboxing.

On February 24, 2008, Chi made his debut as a K-1 fighter on the K-1 Asia MAX 2008 in Seoul. He defeated Ryuji Kajiwara by 3–0 unanimous decision on the extra rounds.

== Professional boxing record ==
35 fights	31 wins	3 losses
By knockout	18	0
By decision	13	3
Draws	1	

No.	Result	Record	Opponent	Type	Round, time	Date	Location	Notes
35	Win	31–3–1	Rodolfo López	UD	12	Dec 17, 2006	Chungmu Art Hall, Seoul, South Korea	Won WBC featherweight title
34	Loss	30–3–1	Takashi Koshimoto	SD	12	Jan 29, 2006	Kyuden Gym, Fukuoka, Fukuoka, Japan	Lost WBC featherweight title
33	Win	30–2–1	Tommy Browne	UD	12	Jan 30, 2005	Convention Hall, Grand Hilton, Seoul, South Korea	Retained WBC featherweight title
32	Win	29–2–1	Eiichi Sugama	TKO	10 (12), 1:04	Jul 24, 2004	Marriott Hotel, Seoul, South Korea	Retained WBC featherweight title
31	Win	28–2–1	Michael Brodie	KO	7 (12), 2:36	Apr 10, 2004	M.E.N. Arena, Manchester, England	Won vacant WBC featherweight title
30	Draw	27–2–1	Michael Brodie	MD	12	Oct 18, 2003	M.E.N. Arena, Manchester, England	For vacant WBC featherweight title
29	Win	27–2	Amorn Longsiriphoom	TKO	4 (10)	Jul 2, 2003	Incheon Gymnasium, Incheon, South Korea	
28	Win	26–2	Sung Yang-Soo	UD	10	Feb 18, 2003	Dangjin, South Korea	
27	Win	25–2	Samuel Duran	KO	3 (12), 3:07	Mar 30, 2002	Guro Highschool, Seoul, South Korea	
26	Loss	24–2	Érik Morales	UD	12	Jul 28, 2001	Staples Center, Los Angeles, California, US	For WBC featherweight title
25	Win	24–1	Donnie Olivetti	TKO	5 (12), 2:42	Dec 8, 2000	Daejin Highschool, Seoul, South Korea	
24	Win	23–1	Baby Lorona Jr.	UD	10	May 14, 2000	Sheraton Walker Hill Hotel, Seoul, South Korea	
23	Win	22–1	Andy Agalenio	KO	3 (12), 1:40	Jan 2, 2000	Sheraton Walker Hill Hotel, Seoul, South Korea	
22	Win	21–1	Roongsurin Lookongchan	KO	3 (10), 1:40	Oct 20, 1999	Dangjin Primary School, Dangjin, South Korea	
21	Win	20–1	Siengthip Sitsyasei	TKO	5 (10), 2:38	Jun 13, 1999	Sheraton Walker Hill Hotel, Seoul, South Korea	
20	Win	19–1	Teofilo Tunacao	KO	4 (10), 3:06	Mar 26, 1999	Gyungyung High School, Cheonan, South Korea	
19	Win	18–1	Sammy Sordilla	KO	3 (10), 2:53	Jan 10, 1999	Ritz Carlton Hotel, Seoul, South Korea	
18	Win	17–1	Joe Escriber	PTS	10	Aug 29, 1998	Ritz Carlton Hotel, Seoul, South Korea	
17	Win	16–1	Akarat Khotkaenan	KO	2 (10), 3:00	May 8, 2010	Guri Gymnasium, Guri, South Korea	
16	Win	15–1	Vichit Chuwatana	PTS	10	Nov 7, 1997	Guri Gymnasium, Guri, South Korea	
15	Win	14–1	Pantan Narongwet	KO	4 (10), 2:26	Aug 21, 1997	Seongnam, South Korea	
14	Win	13–1	Colin Graham	KO	1 (10), 3:06	Feb 5, 1997	Kwangyang, South Korea	
13	Win	12–1	Eddie Boy Penaso	TKO	4 (10), 2:43	May 8, 1996	Seoul, South Korea	
12	Win	11–1	Alexander Pak	PTS	10	Jan 13, 1996	Incheon, South Korea	
11	Win	10–1	Rick Ramirez	KO	6 (10), 2:21	Sep 6, 1995	Gwangmyeong, South Korea	
10	Win	9–1	Jess Maca	PTS	12	Apr 23, 1995	Seoul, South Korea	Won vacant OPBF bantamweight title
9	Win	9–1	Janjan Gigataras	TKO	1 (10), 2:37	Feb 8, 1995	Sheraton Walker Hill Hotel, Seoul, South Korea	
8	Win	7–1	Jo Han-Kil	UD	8 (10), 0:47	Mar 26, 1994	Olympic Park Gymnasium, Seoul, South Korea	Won South Korean super-bantamweight title
7	Win	6–1	Jess Maca	PTS	10	Jul 25, 1993	Hyundai Hotel, Gyeongju, South Korea	
6	Win	5–1	Ronnie Bellaro	UD	10	Feb 6, 1993	Cuneta Astrodome, Pasay City, Metro Manila, Philippines	
5	Win	4–1	Lee Gab-Yong	UD	8	Sep 26, 1992	Pohang Gymnasium, Pohang, South Korea	
4	Win	3–1	Lee Gab-Yong	KO	5 (6), 2:49	Jul 4, 1992	Citizen Hall, Incheon, South Korea	
3	Win	2–1	Choi Ho-Nam	PTS	4	Mar 24, 1992	Inchon Indoor Gymnasium, Incheon, South Korea	
2	Win	1–1	Jun Je-Yun	PTS	4	Jan 18, 1992	Citizen Hall, Wondang, South Korea	
1	Loss	0–1	Park Tae-Sun	PTS	4	Nov 20, 1991	Munhwa Gymnasium, Seoul, South Korea	

== Professional kickboxing record ==
2 fights	1 win	1 loss
By decision	1	1

No.	Date	Result	Opponent	Event	Method	Round	Time
2	20 March 2009	Loss	(Japan) Shingo Garyu	K-1 Award & MAX Korea 2009, Korea	Decision (Unanimous)	3	3:00
1	24 February 2008	Win	(Japan) Ryuji Kajiwara	K-1 Asia MAX 2008 in Seoul, Korea	Decision (Ext.R)	4	3:00

== See also ==
- List of Korean boxers
- List of world featherweight boxing champions

Sporting positions
Regional boxing titles
Vacant Title last held by Vichit Lapmee	OPBF bantamweight champion April 23, 1995 – 1995; Vacated	Vacant Title next held by Oh Jang-Kyun
World boxing titles
Vacant Title last held by Érik Morales	WBC featherweight champion April 10, 2004 – January 29, 2006	Succeeded by Takashi Koshimoto
Preceded by Rodolfo López	WBC featherweight champion December 17, 2006 – July 31, 2007; Retired	Vacant Title next held by Jorge Linares
