= Enrique Sánchez (boxer) =

Mexican boxer

Personal information
- Nickname: El Zurdo de Oro
- Born: Enrique José Sánchez León; 16 July 1972 (age 53) Mexico City, Mexico
- Height: 5 ft 8 in (173 cm)
- Weight: Super bantamweight

Boxing career
- Reach: 69 in (175 cm)
- Stance: Southpaw

Boxing record
- Total fights: 37
- Wins: 30
- Win by KO: 21
- Losses: 3
- Draws: 4

Enrique José Sánchez León (born 16 July 1972) is a Mexican former professional boxer and the former WBA super bantamweight champion.

== Professional career ==
In 1990, Sánchez won pro debut by stopping veteran Felipe Castillo in the fourth round.

=== NABF Super Bantamweight Championship ===
In March 1997 Enrique defeated American Joe Manzano to win the NABF Super Bantamweight title in a twelve-round fight.

=== WBA Super Bantamweight Championship ===
On February 8, 1998, Sánchez won the vacant WBA Super Bantamweight title by upsetting Puerto Rican, former World Boxing Organization world's champion Rafael del Valle over twelve rounds. He would lose his title to fellow Mexican Néstor Garza. All three of his losses were to World Champions Marco Antonio Barrera, Robert Guerrero, and Néstor Garza.

== Professional boxing record ==
37 fights	30 wins	3 losses
By knockout	21	2
By decision	9	1
Draws	4	

No.	Result	Record	Opponent	Type	Round, time	Date	Location	Notes
37	Loss	30–3–4	Robert Guerrero	RTD	8 (10)	2004-06-03	Chinook Winds Casino, Lincoln City, Oregon, U.S.	
36	Draw	30–2–4	Jorge Martinez	TD	6 (10)	2003-10-07	Pechanga Resort & Casino, Temecula, California, U.S.	
35	Draw	30–2–3	Nelson Ramon Medina	TD	2 (10)	2003-06-02	DoubleTree Hotel, Ontario, California, U.S.	
34	Win	30–2–2	Nelson Ramon Medina	TD	4 (10)	2002-03-22	DoubleTree Hotel, Ontario, California, U.S.	
33	Win	29–2–2	Jose Jimenez Valenzuela	UD	10 (10)	2001-12-15	Soboba Casino, San Jacinto, California, U.S.	
32	Loss	28–2–2	Marco Antonio Barrera	RTD	6 (12)	2001-09-08	Lawlor Events Center, Reno, Nevada, U.S.	
31	Draw	28–1–2	Carlos Contreras	TD	7 (10)	2001-02-18	Far West Rodeo, El Paso, Texas, U.S.	
30	Win	28–1–1	Juan Polo Pérez	TKO	4 (10)	2000-10-08	Grand Victoria Casino, Elgin, Illinois, U.S.	
29	Win	27–1–1	Eddy Saenz	TKO	3 (?)	2000-09-02	Don Haskins Center, El Paso, Texas, U.S.	
28	Win	26–1–1	Jesus Sarabia	TKO	7 (10)	2000-02-19	Mandalay Bay Events Center, Paradise, Nevada, U.S.	
27	Win	25–1–1	Eugenio Ventura	KO	3 (?)	1999-06-16	Saint Thomas, U.S. Virgin Islands	
26	Loss	24–1–1	Néstor Garza	UD	12 (12)	1998-12-12	Fantasy Springs Resort Casino, Indio, California, U.S.	Lost WBA super-bantamweight title
25	Draw	24–0–1	Ricardo Medina	PTS	10 (10)	1998-07-05	Fantasy Springs Resort Casino, Indio, California, U.S.	
24	Win	24–0	Rafael del Valle	UD	12 (12)	1998-02-08	Harrah's Casino, Lake Charles, Louisiana, U.S.	Won vacant WBA super-bantamweight title
23	Win	23–0	Nelson Ramon Medina	UD	12 (12)	1997-09-19	Emerald Queen Casino, Tacoma, Washington, U.S.	Retained NABF super-bantamweight title
22	Win	22–0	Juan Manuel Chavez	UD	10 (10)	1997-07-09	Emerald Queen Casino, Tacoma, Washington, U.S.	
21	Win	21–0	Joe Manzano	SD	12 (12)	1997-03-14	Memorial Coliseum, Phoenix, Arizona, U.S.	Won vacant NABF super-bantamweight title
20	Win	20–0	Jesus Chavez	KO	2 (8)	1996-11-30	Tingley Coliseum, Albuquerque, New Mexico, U.S.	
19	Win	19–0	Jorge Munoz	TKO	6 (8)	1996-10-12	Arrowhead Pond, Anaheim, California, U.S.	
18	Win	18–0	Ricardo Vargas	UD	10 (10)	1996-06-01	Boulder Station, Sunrise Manor, Nevada, U.S.	
17	Win	17–0	Juan Luis Torres	TKO	9 (10)	1995-12-11	Great Western Forum, Inglewood, California, U.S.	
16	Win	16–0	Alejandro Landeros	KO	1 (?)	1995-10-23	Great Western Forum, Inglewood, California, U.S.	
15	Win	15–0	Luis Enrique Valenzuela	KO	2 (?)	1995-08-28	Great Western Forum, Inglewood, California, U.S.	
14	Win	14–0	Horacio Ramirez	TKO	2 (8)	1995-07-08	Caesars Palace, Paradise, Nevada, U.S.	
13	Win	13–0	Victor Carpio	KO	2 (?)	1994-08-12	Mexico City, Mexico	
12	Win	12–0	Julian Goiz	TKO	1 (?)	1994-06-03	Tlalnepantla de Baz, Mexico	
11	Win	11–0	Valente Flores	KO	4 (?)	1994-04-22	Arena Naucalpan, Naucalpan, Mexico	
10	Win	10–0	Luis Lara	KO	4 (?)	1994-03-04	Arena Naucalpan, Naucalpan, Mexico	
9	Win	9–0	Moises Rodriguez	TKO	6 (?)	1993-10-09	Mexico City, Mexico	
8	Win	8–0	Jose Guadalupe Rangel	UD	8 (8)	1992-06-06	Mexico City, Mexico	
7	Win	7–0	Jorge Romero	TKO	5 (6)	1992-03-07	Mexico City, Mexico	
6	Win	6–0	Arturo Bautista	TKO	1 (?)	1992-02-08	Mexico City, Mexico	
5	Win	5–0	Marcos Hernandez	TKO	2 (?)	1991-06-29	Mexico City, Mexico	
4	Win	4–0	Isaac Reyes	TKO	1 (4)	1991-05-04	Mexico City, Mexico	
3	Win	3–0	Raul Sanchez	TKO	3 (?)	1991-03-13	Mexico City, Mexico	
2	Win	2–0	Jose Guadalupe Rangel	PTS	4 (4)	1991-02-02	Mexico City, Mexico	
1	Win	1–0	Felipe Castillo	TKO	4 (4)	1990-12-15	Mexico City, Mexico	

== See also ==
- List of southpaw stance boxers
- List of Mexican boxing world champions
- List of world super-bantamweight boxing champions

Sporting positions
Regional boxing titles
Vacant Title last held by Erik Morales	NABF super-bantamweight champion March 14, 1997 – February 8, 1998; Won world title	Vacant Title next held by Aristead Clayton
World boxing titles
Vacant Title last held by Antonio Cermeño	WBA super-bantamweight champion February 8, 1998 – December 12, 1998	Succeeded by Néstor Garza
