= Néstor Garza =

Mexican boxer

Personal information
- Nickname: El Tigre
- Born: Néstor Gabriel Garza; 24 November 1976 (age 49) Reynosa, Tamaulipas, Mexico
- Height: 5 ft 4 1/2 in (164 cm)
- Weight: Super bantamweight

Boxing career
- Reach: 65 in (165 cm)
- Stance: Orthodox

Boxing record
- Total fights: 46
- Wins: 41
- Win by KO: 33
- Losses: 5

Néstor Gabriel Garza (born 24 November 1976) is a Mexican former professional boxer and the former WBA super bantamweight champion.

== Professional career ==
In 1996 he won the Mexican National Championship by beating Jorge Munoz in Reynosa, Tamaulipas. In December 1997, he upset Cruz Carbajal to win the WBO NABO Super Bantamweight title.

=== WBA Super Bantamweight Championship ===
On December 12, 1998 Estrada won the WBA Super Bantamweight title by beating Enrique Sánchez over twelve rounds in Indio, California. He would defend the title twice before losing it to American challenger Clarence Adams.

== Professional boxing record ==
46 fights	41 wins	5 losses
By knockout	33	3
By decision	8	2

No.	Result	Record	Opponent	Type	Round, time	Date	Location	Notes
46	Loss	41–5	Esteban Almaraz	UD	6 (6)	2010-06-18	Convention Center, McAllen, Texas, U.S.	
45	Win	41–4	Mikel Williams	KO	1 (8)	2006-02-17	La Villa Real Convention Center, McAllen, Texas, U.S.	
44	Loss	40–4	Hector Mancina	KO	4 (10)	2002-08-30	Arena Coliseo, Reynosa, Mexico	
43	Loss	40–3	Hector Mancina	KO	5 (?)	2001-10-12	Reynosa, Mexico	
42	Win	40–2	Armando Arriaga	TKO	8 (?)	2000-06-30	Ciudad Juárez, Mexico	
41	Loss	39–2	Clarence Adams	UD	12 (12)	2000-03-04	Mandalay Bay Events Center, Paradise, Nevada, U.S.	Lost WBA super-bantamweight title
40	Win	39–1	Hugo Torres	KO	6 (?)	2000-01-28	Reynosa, Mexico	
39	Win	38–1	Kozo Ishii	TKO	12 (12)	1999-11-21	Rainbow Hall, Nagoya, Japan	Retained WBA super-bantamweight title
38	Win	37–1	Carlos Barreto	TKO	8 (12)	1999-05-08	Hilton Hotel, Winchester, Nevada, U.S.	Retained WBA super-bantamweight title
37	Win	36–1	Enrique Sánchez	UD	12 (12)	1998-12-12	Fantasy Springs Resort Casino, Indio, California, U.S.	Won WBA super-bantamweight title
36	Win	35–1	Jesús Sarabia	UD	12 (12)	1998-10-05	Arrowhead Pond, Anaheim, California, U.S.	Retained NABO super-bantamweight title
35	Win	34–1	Ramon Del Valle	KO	2 (10)	1998-06-15	Plaza de Toros, Reynosa, Mexico	
34	Win	33–1	Freddy Cruz	UD	10 (10)	1998-05-18	Great Western Forum, Inglewood, California, U.S.	
33	Win	32–1	Andres Cazares	KO	3 (10)	1998-04-06	Auditorio Municipal, Reynosa, Mexico	
32	Win	31–1	Javier Narvaez	TKO	1 (?)	1998-03-04	Reynosa, Mexico	
31	Win	30–1	Cruz Carbajal	PTS	12 (12)	1997-12-05	Reynosa, Mexico	Won vacant NABO super-bantamweight title
30	Win	29–1	Luis Enrique Valenzuela	KO	1 (8)	1997-10-18	Tropicana Hotel & Casino, Paradise, Nevada, U.S.	
29	Win	28–1	Carlos Ramirez	KO	1 (?)	1997-07-18	Arena Coliseo, Reynosa, Mexico	
28	Loss	27–1	Angel Rosario	TKO	5 (10)	1997-04-26	Caesars Palace, Paradise, Nevada, U.S.	
27	Win	27–0	Juan Manuel Chavez	TKO	8 (10)	1997-02-03	Arrowhead Pond, Anaheim, California, U.S.	
26	Win	26–0	Miguel Ochoa	TKO	1 (?)	1996-12-13	Reynosa, Mexico	
25	Win	25–0	Alberto Rendon	UD	10 (10)	1996-11-02	Houston, Texas, U.S.	
24	Win	24–0	Jorge Munoz	PTS	12 (12)	1996-08-23	Reynosa, Mexico	Won vacant Mexican super-bantamweight title
23	Win	23–0	Francisco Gonzalez	TKO	2 (?)	1996-07-14	Mammoth Gardens, Denver, Colorado, U.S.	
22	Win	22–0	Roland Gomez	TKO	5 (10)	1996-06-23	The Summit, Houston, Texas, U.S.	
21	Win	21–0	Juan Francisco Soto	UD	10 (10)	1996-04-29	Arrowhead Pond, Anaheim, California, U.S.	
20	Win	20–0	Ramon Gonzales	TKO	6 (10)	1996-03-18	County Coliseum, El Paso, Texas, U.S.	
19	Win	19–0	Julio Cesar Cardona	TKO	3 (?)	1996-02-12	Great Western Forum, Inglewood, California, U.S.	
18	Win	18–0	Genaro Vazquez	KO	1 (?)	1995-12-08	Arena Naucalpan, Naucalpan, Mexico	
17	Win	17–0	Arturo Briones	KO	1 (?)	1995-10-23	Reynosa, Mexico	
16	Win	16–0	Sam Jones	KO	1 (?)	1995-09-22	Reynosa, Mexico	
15	Win	15–0	Esteban Rodriguez	KO	2 (?)	1995-07-15	Great Western Forum, Inglewood, California, U.S.	
14	Win	14–0	Gonzalo Sainos	KO	3 (?)	1995-06-30	Guadalajara, Mexico	
13	Win	13–0	Sergio Aguila	TKO	3 (?)	1995-03-17	Guadalajara, Mexico	
12	Win	12–0	Daniel Ortiz	TKO	2 (?)	1995-02-24	Reynosa, Mexico	
11	Win	11–0	Armando Arriaga	KO	2 (?)	1994-12-16	Reynosa, Mexico	
10	Win	10–0	Francisco Leos	KO	1 (?)	1994-11-28	Reynosa, Mexico	
9	Win	9–0	Alfonso Garcia	TKO	2 (?)	1994-11-14	Reynosa, Mexico	
8	Win	8–0	Tomas Reyes	PTS	6 (6)	1994-10-16	Reynosa, Mexico	
7	Win	7–0	Efren Sarabia	KO	1 (?)	1994-09-19	Reynosa, Mexico	
6	Win	6–0	Saul Orta	KO	1 (?)	1994-08-12	Ciudad Mante, Mexico	
5	Win	5–0	Efrain Garcia	KO	1 (?)	1994-06-16	Mexico	
4	Win	4–0	Jaime Guerrero	KO	1 (?)	1994-06-03	Reynosa, Mexico	
3	Win	3–0	Hector Santana	KO	1 (?)	1994-04-29	Reynosa, Mexico	
2	Win	2–0	Francisco Ruiz	TKO	1 (?)	1994-03-25	Reynosa, Mexico	
1	Win	1–0	Jose Gomez	TKO	2 (?)	1994-02-18	Nuevo Laredo, Mexico	

== See also ==
- List of Mexican boxing world champions
- List of world super-bantamweight boxing champions

Sporting positions
Regional boxing titles
Vacant Title last held by Erik Morales	Mexican super-bantamweight champion August 23, 1996 – 1996; Vacated	Vacant Title next held by Enrique Angeles
Vacant Title last held by Jose Francisco Sarabia	NABO super-bantamweight champion December 5, 1997 – December 12, 1998; Won world title	Vacant Title next held by Jorge Lacierva
World boxing titles
Preceded by Enrique Sánchez	WBA super-bantamweight champion December 12, 1998 – March 4, 2000	Succeeded by Clarence Adams
