= Andrew Lewis (boxer) =

Guyanese boxer

Personal information
- Nickname: Six Heads
- Nationality: Guyanese
- Born: 14 December 1970 Georgetown, Guyana
- Died: 4 May 2015 (aged 44) Hope, Guyana
- Height: 5 ft 8 in (173 cm)
- Weight: Welterweight

Boxing career
- Reach: 72 in (183 cm)
- Stance: Southpaw

Boxing record
- Total fights: 30
- Wins: 23
- Win by KO: 20
- Losses: 4
- Draws: 2
- No contests: 1
Medal record
Men's Boxing
Representing Guyana
Central American and Caribbean Games
Silver medal – second place	1990 Mexico City	Light Welterweight

Andrew Lewis (14 December 1970 – 4 May 2015) was a Guyanese professional boxer in the Middleweight division and the WBA World Welterweight Champion. He also competed in the men's welterweight event at the 1992 Summer Olympics.

== Pro career ==
Nicknamed "Six Heads", Lewis turned pro in 1993.

=== WBA Welterweight Championship ===
Andrew beat James Page in 2001 to capture the Vacant WBA Welterweight Title. Due to his exciting style and power in both hands, Lewis quickly became a popular fighter on HBO. After defending the title against Larry Marks, he took on Ricardo Mayorga and the bout ended in the 2nd round and was ruled a No contest due to a nasty cut on Lewis caused by accidental headbutt. Lewis's lost the title in a rematch to Mayorga in 2002 via 5th-round TKO.

=== WBO Welterweight Championship ===
In 2003 Lewis challenged WBO Welterweight Champion Antonio Margarito, but was TKO'd in the 2nd round.

=== Guyanese Light Middleweight Title ===
From 2005 to 2007 Lewis battled Denny Dalton in a series of 3 fights for the Guyanese Light Middleweight Title. These fights are most notable due to the controversial and bizarre nature of the ending of the second fight. Ahead on points in the 7th Round Lewis retired from the fight due to an extreme need to defecate blamed on consumption of a pre-fight milkshake.

Lewis returned to the ring almost 12 months to the day from this embarrassment to defeat Dalton and claim the Guyanese Light Middleweight Title. This would prove to be the final victory of his career, which ended in October 2008 when he dropped a split decision to Howard Eastman.

== Professional boxing record ==
30 fights	23 wins	4 losses
By knockout	20	3
By decision	3	1
Draws	2	
No contests	1	

No.	Result	Record	Opponent	Type	Round, time	Date	Location	Notes
30	Loss	23–4–2 (1)	Howard Eastman	SD	12 (12)	2008-10-25	National Stadium, Georgetown, Guyana	For Guyanese middleweight title
29	Win	23–3–2 (1)	Denny Dalton	UD	12 (12)	2007-04-07	National Park, Georgetown, Guyana	Won Guyanese super welterweight title
28	Loss	22–3–2 (1)	Denny Dalton	TKO	7 (12)	2006-04-22	National Park, Georgetown, Guyana	For Guyanese super welterweight title
27	Draw	22–2–2 (1)	Denny Dalton	TD	4 (12)	2005-10-15	Cliff Anderson Sports Hall, Georgetown, Guyana	For Guyanese super welterweight title
26	Loss	22–2–1 (1)	Antonio Margarito	TKO	2 (12)	2003-02-08	Mandalay Bay Resort & Casino, Paradise, Nevada, U.S.	For WBO welterweight title
25	Win	22–1–1 (1)	Oscar Delgado	KO	1 (8)	2002-11-22	Coliseo Héctor Solá Bezares, Caguas, Puerto Rico	
24	Loss	21–1–1 (1)	Ricardo Mayorga	TKO	5 (12)	2002-03-30	Sovereign Center, Reading, Pennsylvania, U.S.	Lost WBA welterweight title
23	NC	21–0–1 (1)	Ricardo Mayorga	NC	2 (12)	28 Jul 2001	Staples Center, Los Angeles, California, U.S.	Retained WBA welterweight title
22	Win	21–0–1	Larry Marks	UD	12 (12)	2001-04-28	Hammerstein Ballroom, New York City, New York, U.S.	Retained WBA welterweight title
21	Win	20–0–1	James Page	TKO	7 (12)	2001-02-17	MGM Grand Garden Arena, Las Vegas, Nevada, U.S.	Won vacant WBA welterweight title
20	Win	19–0–1	Sebastian Valdez	TKO	2 (10)	2000-11-17	Peppermill Hotel & Casino, Reno, Nevada, U.S.	
19	Win	18–0–1	Damone Wright	TKO	3 (8)	1999-12-11	Grand Casino, Tunica, Mississippi, U.S.	
18	Win	17–0–1	Alex Lubo	TKO	4 (10)	1999-07-24	Flamingo Hilton, Paradise, Nevada, U.S.	
17	Win	16–0–1	John Stewart	TKO	1 (8)	Feb 20, 1999	Madison Square Garden, New York City, New York, U.S.	
16	Win	15–0–1	Teddy Reid	UD	12 (12)	1998-12-05	Convention Center, Atlantic City, New Jersey, U.S.	Won WBA North America welterweight title
15	Win	14–0–1	Rafael Williams	TKO	2 (6)	1998-08-05	Capitol Theatre, Port Chester, New York, U.S.	
14	Win	13–0–1	Gerald Reed	TKO	2 (?)	1998-04-11	Township Auditorium, Columbia, South Carolina, U.S.	
13	Win	12–0–1	Tony Saladin	TKO	1 (?)	1998-01-30	Holiday Inn, Newark, New Jersey, U.S.	
12	Win	11–0–1	Leon Rouse	KO	1 (?)	1997-12-09	Holiday Inn, Worcester, Massachusetts, U.S.	
11	Win	10–0–1	Gabriel Perez	RTD	1 (10)	1997-07-06	Cliff Anderson Sports Hall, Georgetown, Guyana	
10	Win	9–0–1	Stephan Johnson	TKO	6 (10)	1997-06-24	Music City Mix Factory, Nashville, Tennessee, U.S.	
9	Win	8–0–1	Terrence Alli	TKO	2 (12)	1996-09-14	Georgetown Cricket Club Ground, Georgetown, Guyana	Won vacant Guyanese welterweight title
8	Win	7–0–1	Ashton Wilson	TKO	2 (8)	1996-03-03	Cliff Anderson Sports Hall, Georgetown, Guyana	
7	Win	6–0–1	Marcelle Daniels	TKO	6 (?)	1995-02-25	National Sports Hall, Georgetown, Guyana	
6	Draw	5–0–1	Han Kim	TD	2 (10)	1994-06-26	National Sports Hall, Georgetown, Guyana	
5	Win	5–0	Benjamin Modeste	TKO	1 (?)	1994-05-29	National Sports Hall, Georgetown, Guyana	
4	Win	4–0	Rockford Abrams	KO	1 (8)	1994-03-26	Georgetown, Guyana	
3	Win	3–0	Calvin John	TKO	2 (?)	1993-12-04	National Sports Hall, Georgetown, Guyana	
2	Win	2–0	Patrick Farley	TKO	4 (6)	1993-10-01	National Sports Hall, Georgetown, Guyana	
1	Win	1–0	Fitzroy Davidson	KO	2 (6)	1993-02-28	National Sports Hall, Georgetown, Guyana	

== Personal life ==
On 5 June 2007 his uncle Abdel Nur surrendered in Trinidad as a suspect in the John F. Kennedy International Airport terror plot. Lewis called his uncle a good Muslim and said he couldn't believe his uncle was involved in the plot. "It must be the wrong person," and also said "My uncle was never into terrorism. He condemned the World Trade Center attacks"

== Death ==
On 4 May 2015, Lewis, on his bicycle, collided with a Premio car at Hope on the East Bank of Demerara in Guyana. He later succumbed to his severe head injuries at a local hospital.

== See also ==
- List of world welterweight boxing champions
- List of southpaw stance boxers

Sporting positions
World boxing titles
Vacant Title last held by James Page	WBA welterweight champion February 17, 2001 – March 30, 2002	Succeeded by Ricardo Mayorga
