= Antonio Cermeño =

Venezuelan boxer (1969–2014)

Personal information
- Nickname: El Coloso ("The Colossus")
- Born: Antonio José Verdú Cermak; 6 March 1969 Río Chico, Miranda, Venezuela
- Died: 25 February 2014 (aged 44) Miranda, Venezuela
- Height: 5 ft 9 1/2 in (177 cm)
- Weight: Super-bantamweight; Featherweight; Super-featherweight

Boxing career
- Reach: 72 in (183 cm)
- Stance: Orthodox

Boxing record
- Total fights: 52
- Wins: 45
- Win by KO: 31
- Losses: 7

Antonio Cermeño (6 March 1969 – 25 February 2014) was a Venezuelan professional boxer who competed from 1990 to 2006. He is a world champion in two weight classes, having held the World Boxing Association (WBA) super-bantamweight title from 1995 to 1997 and the WBA featherweight title from 1998 to 1999.

== Professional career ==
Antonio turned professional in 1990 & compiled a record of 21–1 before defeating Wilfredo Vázquez, to win the WBA super-bantamweight title. He would defend the title seven times including against fellow countryman Yober Ortega. He would eventually move up to featherweight & became a two division champion by beating Genaro Rios to win the vacant WBA featherweight title.

== Professional boxing record ==
52 fights	45 wins	7 losses
By knockout	31	1
By decision	14	6

No.	Result	Record	Opponent	Type	Round, time	Date	Location	Notes
52	Loss	45–7	Santos Benavides	RTD	4 (10), 3:00	2 Sep 2006	Gimnasio Alexis Arguello, Managua, Nicaragua	For vacant WBA Fedelatin super-featherweight title
51	Loss	45–6	Kosei Nakama	UD	6	10 Dec 2005	Chatan Dome, Okinawa, Japan	
50	Win	45–5	Raul Barrios	KO	1 (10)	15 Sep 2005	Circulo Militar, Maracay, Venezuela	
49	Win	44–5	Jose Hernandez	KO	7 (10)	22 Dec 2004	Parque Naciones Unidas, Caracas, Venezuela	
48	Win	43–5	Jose Luis Gil Atencio	TKO	4 (10)	25 Sep 2004	Caracas, Venezuela	
47	Win	42–5	Evert Moreno	KO	3 (12)	31 Jul 2004	El Poliedro, Caracas, Venezuela	Won vacant WBA Fedebol super-featherweight title
46	Loss	41–5	Joe Morales	UD	10	16 May 2003	Sunset Station, San Antonio, Texas, U.S.	
45	Win	41–4	Marcos Badillo	UD	8	9 Aug 2002	Civic Center, Kissimmee, Florida, U.S.	
44	Win	40–4	Shamir Reyes	TKO	10 (12), 1:28	11 May 2002	Roberto Clemente Coliseum, San Juan, Puerto Rico	Won vacant WBA Fedelatin super-featherweight title
43	Loss	39–4	Armando Cordoba	MD	12	16 Jun 2001	Gimnasio Nuevo Panama, Juan Díaz, Panama	For WBA Fedebol featherweight title
42	Win	39–3	Jorge Soto	TKO	2 (10)	21 May 2001	El Paraíso, Venezuela	
41	Win	38–3	Carlos Rocha	TKO	2 (10), 1:27	20 May 2000	Grand Casino, Tunica Resorts, Mississippi, U.S.	
40	Win	37–3	Arcelio Diaz	KO	6 (?)	4 Mar 2000	Estadio José David Ugarte, Coro, Venezuela	
39	Win	36–3	Yober Ortega	MD	12	9 Oct 1999	Parque Naciones Unidas, Caracas, Venezuela	Won WBA interim super-bantamweight title
38	Loss	35–3	Freddie Norwood	SD	12	29 May 1999	Roberto Clemente Coliseum, San Juan, Puerto Rico	Lost WBA featherweight title
37	Win	35–2	Eddy Sáenz	KO	2 (12), 2:55	5 Feb 1999	Jai Alai Fronton, Miami, Florida, U.S.	Retained WBA featherweight title
36	Win	34–2	Genaro Rios	KO	4 (12), 2:57	3 Oct 1998	Gimnasio José Beracasa, Caracas, Venezuela	Won vacant WBA featherweight title
35	Win	33–2	Ever Garcia Hernandez	TKO	4 (6)	17 Aug 1998	Willemstad, Curaçao	
34	Win	32–2	Cristobal Cabreiro	KO	3 (?)	7 Jul 1998	Guatire, Venezuela	
33	Loss	31–2	Freddie Norwood	UD	12	3 Apr 1998	Coliseo Rubén Rodríguez, Bayamón, Puerto Rico	For vacant WBA featherweight title
32	Win	31–1	Jose Zerpa	KO	2 (?)	20 Dec 1997	Caracas, Venezuela	
31	Win	30–1	Asdrubal Castro	TKO	2 (?)	29 Nov 1997	Caracas, Venezuela	
30	Win	29–1	Jose Rojas	UD	12	27 Sep 1997	Gimnasio José Beracasa, Caracas, Venezuela	Retained WBA super-bantamweight title
29	Win	28–1	Yūichi Kasai	KO	12 (12), 2:35	26 Jul 1997	Arena, Yokohama, Japan	Retained WBA super-bantamweight title
28	Win	27–1	Ángel Chacón	UD	12	10 May 1997	Convention Center, Miami, Florida, U.S.	Retained WBA super-bantamweight title
27	Win	26–1	Yūichi Kasai	UD	12	21 Dec 1996	The Aladdin, Paradise, Nevada, U.S.	Retained WBA super-bantamweight title
26	Win	25–1	Eddy Sáenz	RTD	5 (12), 3:00	9 Nov 1996	MGM Grand Garden Arena, Paradise, Nevada, U.S.	Retained WBA super-bantamweight title
25	Win	24–1	Yober Ortega	UD	12	23 Mar 1996	Miami Arena, Miami, Florida, U.S.	Retained WBA super-bantamweight title
24	Win	23–1	Jesus Salud	UD	12	26 Nov 1995	Coliseo El Limon, Maracay, Venezuela	Retained WBA super-bantamweight title
23	Win	22–1	Wilfredo Vázquez	UD	12	13 May 1995	Coliseo Rubén Rodríguez, Bayamón, Puerto Rico	Won WBA super-bantamweight title
22	Win	21–1	Felix Guzman	TKO	2 (?)	5 Nov 1994	Los Teques, Venezuela	
21	Win	20–1	Jose Medina	KO	2 (?)	3 Sep 1994	Caracas, Venezuela	
20	Win	19–1	Giovanni Rodriguez	TKO	1 (?)	28 May 1994	Los Teques, Venezuela	
19	Loss	18–1	Choi Jae-Won	PTS	10	5 Dec 1993	Seoul, South Korea	
18	Win	18–0	Ramon Guzman	TKO	4 (12)	21 Aug 1993	Caracas, Venezuela	Won vacant WBA Fedelatin super-bantamweight title
17	Win	17–0	Ismael DeAvila	TKO	5 (?)	20 Mar 1993	Caracas, Venezuela	
16	Win	16–0	Jose Vargas	TKO	4 (?)	20 Nov 1992	Caracas, Venezuela	
15	Win	15–0	Aldrin Sosa	PTS	10	9 Oct 1992	Caracas, Venezuela	
14	Win	14–0	Luis Malave	TKO	3 (?)	31 Jul 1992	Caracas, Venezuela	
13	Win	13–0	Manuel Vilchez	PTS	10	15 May 1992	Caracas, Venezuela	
12	Win	12–0	Antonio Montero	TKO	1 (?)	22 Apr 1992	Turmero, Venezuela	
11	Win	11–0	Aldrin Sosa	PTS	10	13 Mar 1992	Caracas, Venezuela	
10	Win	10–0	Jose Hernandez	TKO	5 (?)	7 Dec 1991	Caracas, Venezuela	
9	Win	9–0	Jesus Flores	PTS	10	28 Oct 1991	Caracas, Venezuela	
8	Win	8–0	Luis Rojas	TKO	2 (?)	27 Sep 1991	Petare, Venezuela	
7	Win	7–0	Frank Rodriguez	PTS	10	14 Jun 1991	Turmero, Venezuela	
6	Win	6–0	Henry Mejias	KO	1 (?)	30 May 1991	Petare, Venezuela	
5	Win	5–0	Emiliano Mayoral	TKO	6 (?)	7 Apr 1991	Turmero, Venezuela	
4	Win	4–0	Andy Villaruel	TKO	2 (?)	28 Feb 1991	Caracas, Venezuela	
3	Win	3–0	Ismael Rondon	KO	2 (?)	10 Dec 1990	Caracas, Venezuela	
2	Win	2–0	Nelson Ramon Medina	PTS	4	28 Oct 1990	Caracas, Venezuela	
1	Win	1–0	Jose Medina	TKO	2 (?)	1 Sep 1990	Petare, Venezuela	

== Titles in boxing ==
=== Major world titles ===
- WBA super-bantamweight champion (122 lbs)
- WBA featherweight champion (126 lbs)

=== Interim world titles ===
- WBA interim super-bantamweight champion (122 lbs)

=== Regional/International titles ===
- WBA Fedelatin super-bantamweight champion (122 lbs)
- WBA Fedebol super-featherweight champion (130 lbs)
- WBA Fedelatin super-featherweight champion (130 lbs)

== Personal life and death ==
According to his wife, on 24 February 2014, the two of them and others were kidnapped in east Caracas. His wife escaped when the kidnappers released her after refueling the car, but Cermeño remained captive. He was found shot to death the next morning at kilometer 78 of the Gran Mariscal de Ayacucho highway.

== See also ==
- List of world super-bantamweight boxing champions
- List of world featherweight boxing champions

Sporting positions
Regional boxing titles
Vacant Title last held by Juan Rodríguez	WBA Fedelatin super-bantamweight champion 21 August 1993 – 13 May 1995; Won world title	Vacant Title next held by Yober Ortega
Vacant Title last held by Benito Rodriguez	WBA Fedelatin super-featherweight champion 11 May 2002 – 2003; Vacated	Vacant Title next held by Vicente Mosquera
Vacant Title last held by Johnny Antequera	WBA Fedebol super-featherweight champion 31 July 2004 – 2004; Vacated	Vacant Title next held by Manuel Leyva
World boxing titles
Preceded by Wilfredo Vázquez	WBA super-bantamweight champion 13 May 1995 – 4 October 1997; Vacated	Vacant Title next held by Enrique Sánchez
Vacant Title last held by Freddie Norwood	WBA featherweight champion 3 October 1998 – 29 May 1999	Succeeded by Freddie Norwood
Vacant Title last held by Carlos Barreto	WBA super-bantamweight champion Interim title 10 October 1999 – 2000; Vacated	Vacant Title next held by Yober Ortega
