= Freddie Norwood =

American boxer

Personal information
- Nickname: Lil' Hagler
- Born: February 14, 1970 (age 56) Saint Louis, Missouri, U.S.
- Height: 5 ft 6.5 in (1.69 m)
- Weight: Featherweight

Boxing career
- Reach: 68 in (173 cm)
- Stance: Southpaw

Boxing record
- Total fights: 48
- Wins: 43
- Win by KO: 23
- Losses: 4
- Draws: 1

Freddie Norwood (born February 14, 1970) is an American professional boxer. Known as "Lil Hagler", Norwood defeated Antonio Cermeño to win the WBA Featherweight Title in 1998. He successfully defended his title eight times before losing his title by a controversial 11th-round TKO to Derrick Gainer. Among his notable defenses were a 9th-round KO over former WBC featherweight champion Takashi Koshimoto, a unanimous decision victory over former WBO featherweight champ Julio Pablo Chacón, and future IBF and WBA Featherweight titleholder Juan Manuel Márquez. After losing his title to Gainer, Norwood retired from boxing, age 30. Eight years later he made a comeback and had another 8 fights winning 5, and finally retiring age 41. (see below)

== Professional boxing record ==
48 fights	43 wins	4 losses
By knockout	23	2
By decision	19	1
By disqualification	1	1
Draws	1	

No.	Result	Record	Opponent	Type	Round(s), time	Date	Location	Notes
48	Loss	43–4–1	Ray Narh	UD	10	Mar 4, 2011	Jostens Center, Lake Buena Vista, Florida, U.S.	
47	Win	43–3–1	José Celaya	UD	8	Jul 30, 2009	Expo Center, El Monte, California, U.S.	
46	Loss	42–3–1	Johnnie Edwards	KO	7 (8), 2:57	May 21, 2008	The Field House, Camp Lejuene, North Carolina, U.S.	
45	Loss	42–2–1	Johnnie Edwards	DQ	6 (10), 0:58	Sep 16, 2007	Northern Quest Casino, Airway Heights, Washington, U.S.	Low blows
44	Win	42–1–1	Armando Cordoba	UD	8	Jun 28, 2007	Ameristar Casino, Saint Charles, Missouri, U.S.	
43	Win	41–1–1	Steve Mincks	TKO	3 (8), 2:11	May 11, 2007	Scottrade Center, Saint Louis, Missouri, U.S.	
42	Win	40–1–1	Anthony Martinez	UD	8	Aug 4, 2006	FedEx Forum, Memphis, Tennessee, U.S.	
41	Win	39–1–1	Darien Ford	UD	6	Jun 17, 2006	FedEx Forum, Memphis, Tennessee, U.S.	
40	Loss	38–1–1	Derrick Gainer	TKO	11 (12), 1:56	Sep 9, 2000	New Orleans Arena, New Orleans, Louisiana, U.S.	Lost WBA featherweight title
39	Win	38–0–1	Pablo Chacón	UD	12	May 25, 2000	Estadio Malvinas Argentinas, Mendoza, Argentina	Retained WBA featherweight title
38	Win	37–0–1	Takashi Koshimoto	KO	9 (12), 1:59	Jan 30, 2000	International Center, Fukuoka, Japan	Retained WBA featherweight title
37	Win	36–0–1	Juan Manuel Márquez	UD	12	Sep 11, 1999	Mandalay Bay Resort & Casino, Las Vegas, Nevada, U.S.	Retained WBA featherweight title
36	Win	35–0–1	Antonio Cermeño	SD	12	May 29, 1999	Coliseo Roberto Clemente, Bayamon, Puerto Rico	Won WBA featherweight title
35	Win	34–0–1	Moises Rodriguez	PTS	8	Dec 12, 1998	Fantasy Springs Casino, Indio, California, U.S.	
34	Win	33–0–1	Koji Matsumoto	TKO	10 (12), 0:25	Sep 22, 1998	Yoyogi #2 Gymnasium, Tokyo, Japan	WBA featherweight title at stake; Only for Matsumoto (overweight)
33	Win	32–0–1	Luis Mendoza	UD	12	Jul 10, 1998	Miccosukee Indian Gaming Resort, Miami, Florida, U.S.	Retained WBA featherweight title
32	Win	31–0–1	Genaro Rios	TKO	8 (12), 1:05	Jun 13, 1998	Trump Taj Mahal, Atlantic City, New Jersey, U.S.	Retained WBA featherweight title
31	Win	30–0–1	Antonio Cermeño	UD	12	Apr 3, 1998	Coliseo Ruben Rodriguez, Bayamon, Puerto Rico	Won vacant WBA featherweight title
30	Win	29–0–1	Benito Rodriguez	TKO	6 (10), 0:43	Dec 12, 1997	Auditorio Municipal, Tijuana, Mexico	
29	Win	28–0–1	Agapito Sánchez	UD	12	Aug 8, 1997	Station Casino, Kansas City, Missouri, U.S.	Won vacant IBA Continental featherweight title
28	Win	27–0–1	Darryl Pinckney	UD	10	Jul 13, 1997	Grand Casino, Biloxi, Mississippi, U.S.	
27	Win	26–0–1	Mauricio Martínez	TKO	2 (10), 1:48	May 31, 1997	Trump Taj Mahal, Atlantic City, New Jersey, U.S.	
26	Win	25–0–1	Roberto Avila	UD	10	Feb 16, 1997	Hale Arena, Kansas City, Missouri, U.S.	
25	Win	24–0–1	Ray Rivera	TKO	3 (6)	Dec 21, 1996	Beaumont Club, Kansas City, Missouri, U.S.	
24	Win	23–0–1	Jeff Whaley	TKO	1 (6), 2:48	Dec 11, 1996	Fireman's Local 77, Saint Joseph, Missouri, U.S.	
23	Win	22–0–1	Stanley Jones	MD	4	Nov 27, 1996	Beaumont Club, Kansas City, Missouri, U.S.	
22	Win	21–0–1	Clarence Barnes	TKO	8 (8), 2:51	Nov 28, 1994	Henry VIII Hotel, Bridgeton, Missouri, U.S.	
21	Win	20–0–1	Antonio Garris	TKO	1 (?), 1:30	Jun 22, 1994	Raleigh, North Carolina, U.S.	
20	Win	19–0–1	Terrence Carson	KO	1 (?)	Apr 1, 1994	Henry VIII Hotel, Bridgeton, Missouri, U.S.	
19	Win	18–0–1	Santos Rodriguez	KO	1 (8), 0:45	Feb 12, 1994	Cervantes Center, Saint Louis, Missouri, U.S.	
18	Draw	17–0–1	Oscar Washington	TD	1 (8)	Mar 29, 1993	Ritz-Carlton, Clayton, Missouri, U.S.	
17	Win	17–0	Steve Young	KO	6 (?)	Aug 29, 1992	Westport Playhouse, Saint Louis, Missouri, U.S.	
16	Win	16–0	Vuyani Bungu	PTS	8	Apr 18, 1992	Palazzetto dello Sport, Treviolo, Italy	
15	Win	15–0	Capri Lipkin	DQ	8 (?)	Dec 21, 1991	Civic Center Arena, Laredo, Texas, U.S.	
14	Win	14–0	Lee Cargle	TKO	2 (?)	May 3, 1991	Clarion Hotel Ballroom, Saint Louis, Missouri, U.S.	
13	Win	13–0	Gary Spencer	KO	1 (?), 1:00	Mar 27, 1991	Tulsa City Limits, Tulsa, Oklahoma, U.S.	
12	Win	12–0	Ed Blythe	KO	1 (?)	Feb 24, 1991	Lexington, Kentucky, U.S.	
11	Win	11–0	Bruce Nuby	KO	3 (6), 2:04	Feb 15, 1991	Clarion Hotel Ballroom, Saint Louis, Missouri, U.S.	
10	Win	10–0	Jeff McCully	TKO	1 (?)	Dec 28, 1990	Rupp Arena, Lexington, Kentucky, U.S.	
9	Win	9–0	Kevin Benz	KO	1 (6), 2:59	Oct 19, 1990	Clarion Hotel Ballroom, Saint Louis, Missouri, U.S.	
8	Win	8–0	Gerald Shelton	UD	6	Sep 10, 1990	Henry VIII Hotel, Bridgeton, Missouri, U.S.	
7	Win	7–0	Antti Juntumaa	TKO	6 (6), 2:08	Aug 20, 1990	Urheilutalo, Helsinki, Finland	
6	Win	6–0	Tom Cannette	TKO	2 (4), 2:11	Jul 30, 1990	Henry VIII Hotel, Bridgeton, Missouri, U.S.	
5	Win	5–0	Gerald Shelton	PTS	6	Jul 10, 1990	All Stars America Sports Bar, Merrillville, Indiana, U.S.	
4	Win	4–0	Randy Reedy	UD	6	Jun 18, 1990	Henry VIII Hotel, Bridgeton, Missouri, U.S.	
3	Win	3–0	Oscar Gonzalez	TKO	4 (?)	Jan 27, 1990	Trump Plaza Hotel, Atlantic City, New Jersey, U.S.	
2	Win	2–0	Ronald Freeman	PTS	4	Oct 9, 1989	Clarion Hotel Ballroom, Saint Louis, Missouri, U.S.	
1	Win	1–0	Mario Amparan	TKO	2 (?)	Aug 20, 1989	Norfolk Scope, Norfolk, Virginia, U.S.	

Achievements
Vacant Title last held by Wilfredo Vázquez	WBA Featherweight Champion; April 3 - September 21, 1998; Stripped	Vacant Title next held by Antonio Cermeño
Preceded by Antonio Cermeño	WBA Featherweight Champion; May 29, 1999 - September 9, 2000; Stripped	Vacant Title next held by Derrick Gainer
