= Rogers Mtagwa =

Tanzanian boxer (born 1979)

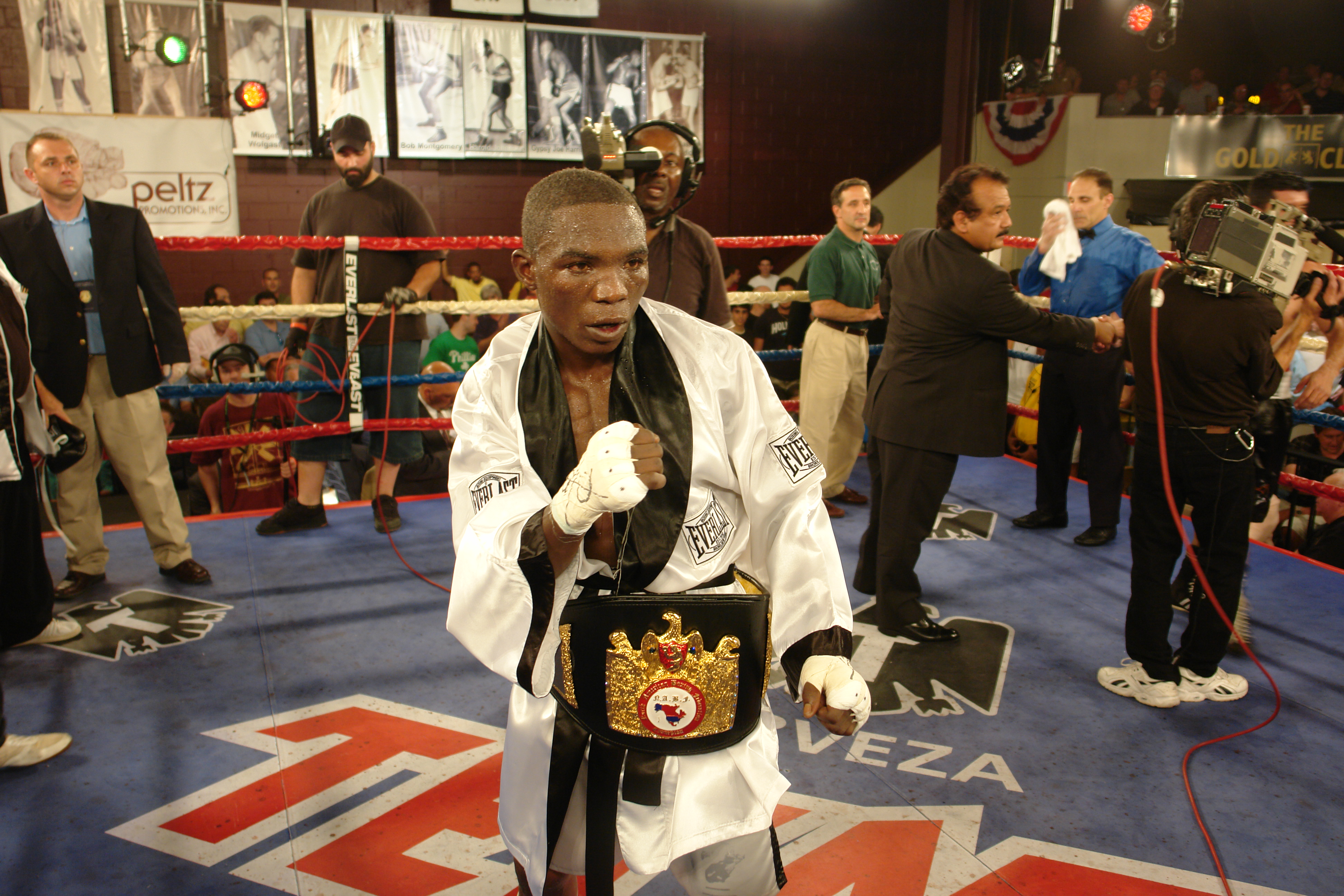

Personal information
- Nickname: The Tiger
- Born: 22 March 1979 (age 47) Dodoma, Tanzania
- Height: 5 ft 5 in (165 cm)
- Weight: Junior featherweight; Featherweight

Boxing career
- Reach: 72 in (183 cm)
- Stance: Orthodox

Boxing record
- Total fights: 47
- Wins: 27
- Win by KO: 19
- Losses: 17
- Draws: 2
- No contests: 1

Rogers Mtagwa (born March 22, 1979) is a Tanzanian former professional boxer who competed from 1997 to 2014. He challenged three times for a world title; the WBO junior featherweight title in 2009, the WBA (Regular) featherweight title in 2010, and the WBC featherweight title in 2011.

== Professional career ==
Mtagwa began his professional career on February 10, 1997, gaining a points victory over Alfred Mgaromba in Dar es Salaam. Mtagwa tasted defeat for the first time when he travelled to Kenya to face Joseph Waweru, losing a six rounds points decision. However, this loss was avenged when he scored a knockout over Waweru in the rematch.

Mtagwa left Tanzania and relocated to Philadelphia, United States. His first fight in his new home city was on May 2, 2000, losing an eight round decision to Debind Thapa.

On October 10, 2009 Mtagwa challenged for the WBO super bantamweight title against the undefeated Puerto Rican fighter Juan Manuel López in what was considered a fight of the year candidate. Although Lopez won the fight by a unanimous decision, he was hurt badly by Mtagwa in the later rounds and struggled to stay on his feet to hear the final bell.

On 23 January 2010 Mtagwa stepped up to featherweight to unsuccessfully challenge the Cuban Yuriorkis Gamboa for the WBA featherweight title. Mtagwa did not perform as well as he did in his previous title challenge, he was knocked down three times before the referee called a stop to the action in round two.

== Professional boxing record ==
| 47 fights | 27 wins | 17 losses |
|---|---|---|
| By knockout | 19 | 5 |
| By decision | 8 | 12 |
| Draws | 2 | |
| No contests | 1 | |

| No. | Result | Record | Opponent | Type | Round, time | Date | Location | Notes |
|---|---|---|---|---|---|---|---|---|
| 47 | Loss | 27–17–2 (1) | (Puerto Rico) Juan Carlos Velasquez | MD | 6 | May 1, 2014 | (United States) Park Race Track, Hialeah, Florida, U.S. | |
| 46 | Loss | 27–16–2 (1) | (United States) Cornelius Lock | TKO | 4 (8), 1:10 | Feb 21, 2014 | (United States) Dover Downs, Dover, Delaware, U.S. | |
| 45 | Loss | 27–15–2 (1) | (Mexico) Jhonny González | TKO | 2 (12), 2:15 | Sep 15, 2011 | (United States) County Coliseum, El Paso, Texas, U.S. | For WBC featherweight title |
| 44 | Win | 27–14–2 (1) | (Mexico) Pedro Navarrete | TKO | 8 | Aug 13, 2011 | Centro Internacional, Acapulco, Mexico | |
| 43 | Loss | 26–14–2 (1) | (Cuba) Yuriorkis Gamboa | TKO | 2 (12), 2:35 | Jan 23, 2010 | (United States) Madison Square Garden, New York City, New York, U.S. | For WBA (Regular) featherweight title |
| 42 | Loss | 26–13–2 (1) | (Puerto Rico) Juan Manuel López | UD | 12 | Oct 10, 2009 | (United States) Madison Square Garden, New York City, New York, U.S. | For WBO junior featherweight title |
| 41 | Win | 26–12–2 (1) | (Mexico) Ricardo Medina | UD | 10 | May 1, 2009 | (United States) The Blue Horizon, Philadelphia, Pennsylvania, U.S. | |
| 40 | Win | 25–12–2 (1) | (Mexico) Tomas Villa | KO | 10 (10), 1:20 | Nov 7, 2008 | (United States) Casino Del Sol, Tucson, Arizona, U.S. | |
| 39 | Win | 24–12–2 (1) | (Mexico) Aldo Valtierra | UD | 10 | Mar 7, 2008 | (United States) New Alhambra Arena, Philadelphia, Pennsylvania, U.S. | |
| 38 | Loss | 23–12–2 (1) | (Australia) Billy Dib | UD | 8 | Nov 10, 2007 | (United States) Madison Square Garden, New York City, New York, U.S. | |
| 37 | NC | 23–11–2 (1) | (Mexico) Aldo Valtierra | SD | 12 | Jul 20, 2007 | (United States) New Alhambra Arena, Philadelphia, Pennsylvania, U.S. | Vacant NABF featherweight title at stake; Originally a SD win for Mtagwa, later ruled an NC after he failed a drug test |
| 36 | Win | 23–11–2 | (United States) Terrance Roy | KO | 2 (8), 1:35 | Apr 11, 2007 | (United States) The Citadel, Charleston, South Carolina, U.S. | |
| 35 | Loss | 22–11–2 | (Mexico) Martin Honorio | SD | 12 | Nov 10, 2006 | (United States) Cicero Stadium, Cicero, Illinois, U.S. | Lost USBA featherweight title |
| 34 | Win | 22–10–2 | (United States) Alvin Brown | KO | 4 (12), 3:06 | Aug 2, 2006 | (United States) New Alhambra Arena, Philadelphia, Pennsylvania, U.S. | Retained USBA featherweight title |
| 33 | Win | 21–10–2 | (Armenia) Artyom Simonyan | KO | 4 (12), 1:58 | Jun 16, 2006 | (United States) New Alhambra Arena, Philadelphia, Pennsylvania, U.S. | Retained USBA featherweight title |
| 32 | Loss | 20–10–2 | (Mexico) Orlando Salido | TKO | 5 (12), 3:00 | Mar 18, 2006 | (United States) The Centre, Evansville, Indiana, U.S. | |
| 31 | Win | 20–9–2 | (United States) Joe Morales | TKO | 10 (12), 1:58 | Jul 8, 2005 | (United States) Athletic Center, New Haven, Connecticut, U.S. | Won vacant USBA featherweight title |
| 30 | Win | 19–9–2 | (Mexico) Fernando Trejo | SD | 10 | Mar 18, 2005 | (United States) New Alhambra Arena, Philadelphia, Pennsylvania, U.S. | |
| 29 | Loss | 18–9–2 | (Dominican Republic) Agapito Sánchez | MD | 10 | Oct 14, 2004 | (United States) Hanover Marriott, Whippany, New Jersey, U.S. | |
| 28 | Win | 18–8–2 | (United States) Broderick Harper | KO | 2 (8) | May 14, 2004 | (United States) New Alhambra Arena, Philadelphia, Pennsylvania, U.S. | |
| 27 | Loss | 17–8–2 | (Brazil) Valdemir Pereira | TKO | 8 (10), 2:36 | Jan 3, 2004 | (United States) Foxwoods Resort Casino, Ledyard, Connecticut, U.S. | |
| 26 | Win | 17–7–2 | (Colombia) Isidro Tejedor | UD | 10 | Aug 22, 2003 | (United States) Silver Star Hotel and Casino, Choctaw, Mississippi, U.S. | |
| 25 | Win | 16–7–2 | (United States) Corey Alarcon | KO | 3 (6), 1:56 | Jun 27, 2003 | (United States) Tropicana Hotel & Casino, Atlantic City, New Jersey, U.S. | |
| 24 | Win | 15–7–2 | (United States) Kareem Braithwaite | TKO | 4 (6), 2:08 | Jan 31, 2003 | (United States) Tropicana Hotel & Casino, Atlantic City, New Jersey, U.S. | |
| 23 | Loss | 14–7–2 | (Puerto Rico) Jose Reyes | SD | 8 | Oct 11, 2002 | (United States) First Union Spectrum, Philadelphia, Pennsylvania, U.S. | |
| 22 | Draw | 14–6–2 | (Dominican Republic) Edwin Santana | SD | 10 | Jul 12, 2002 | (United States) Hampton Beach Casino Ballroom, Hampton Beach, New Hampshire, U.S. | |
| 21 | Loss | 14–6–1 | (Dominican Republic) Antonio Diaz | MD | 10 | May 25, 2002 | (United States) Lowes Speedway, Charlotte, North Carolina, U.S. | |
| 20 | Draw | 14–5–1 | (Panama) Victorio Abadia | PTS | 4 | Mar 15, 2002 | (United States) Fernwood Hotel & Resort, Bushkill, Pennsylvania, U.S. | |
| 19 | Win | 14–5 | (United States) Steve Trumble | TKO | 3 (6) | Sep 21, 2001 | (United States) The Blue Horizon, Philadelphia, Pennsylvania, U.S. | |
| 18 | Win | 13–5 | (United States) Donovan Carey | TKO | 2 | Jun 15, 2001 | (United States) The Blue Horizon, Philadelphia, Pennsylvania, U.S. | |
| 17 | Win | 12–5 | (Venezuela) Nelson Ramon Medina | TKO | 6 (6) | Feb 21, 2001 | (United States) Tropicana Hotel & Casino, Atlantic City, New Jersey, U.S. | |
| 16 | Loss | 11–5 | (Mexico) Emmanuel Lucero | UD | 10 | Oct 6, 2000 | (United States) Bally's, Atlantic City, New Jersey, U.S. | |
| 15 | Loss | 11–4 | (Colombia) Isidro Tejedor | PTS | 8 | Sep 22, 2000 | (United States) The Blue Horizon, Philadelphia, Pennsylvania, U.S. | |
| 14 | Win | 11–3 | (United States) Garvin Crout | KO | 1 (8), 2:39 | Sep 12, 2000 | (United States) The Blue Horizon, Philadelphia, Pennsylvania, U.S. | |
| 13 | Loss | 10–3 | (Nepal) Debendra Thapa | UD | 8 | May 2, 2000 | (United States) Big O Center, Philadelphia, Pennsylvania, U.S. | |
| 12 | Win | 10–2 | (Tanzania) Obote Ameme | PTS | 6 | Apr 8, 2000 | Dar-Es-Salaam, Tanzania | |
| 11 | Win | 9–2 | (Uganda) Charles Kasumba | KO | 12 (12) | Dec 31, 1999 | Nakivubo Stadium, Kampala, Uganda | Won vacant African junior featherweight title |
| 10 | Win | 8–2 | (Kenya) Musa Njue | KO | 2 | Sep 4, 1999 | Dar-Es-Salaam, Tanzania | |
| 9 | Win | 7–2 | (Tanzania) Obote Ameme | PTS | 8 | Aug 15, 1999 | Dar-Es-Salaam, Tanzania | |
| 8 | Win | 6–2 | (Tanzania) Rashid Ally | KO | 5 | Dec 19, 1998 | Dar-Es-Salaam, Tanzania | |
| 7 | Loss | 5–2 | (Uganda) Michael Kizza | PTS | 10 | Oct 18, 1998 | Kampala, Uganda | For vacant African Zone 5 junior featherweight title |
| 6 | Win | 5–1 | (Kenya) Hillary Olwenya | KO | 2 | Sep 12, 1998 | Safari Park Hotel, Nairobi, Kenya | |
| 5 | Win | 4–1 | (Kenya) Joseph Waweru | KO | 4 | Sep 5, 1998 | Mombasa, Kenya | |
| 4 | Loss | 3–1 | (Kenya) Joseph Waweru | PTS | 6 | Aug 29, 1998 | Kenyatta International Conference Centre, Nairobi, Kenya | |
| 3 | Win | 3–0 | (Tanzania) Rashid Ally | PTS | 10 | Aug 25, 1997 | Dar-Es-Salaam, Tanzania | |
| 2 | Win | 2–0 | (Tanzania) Rajab Mohamed | KO | 3 (4) | Jul 23, 1997 | Dar-Es-Salaam, Tanzania | |
| 1 | Win | 1–0 | Alfred Mgaromba | PTS | 4 | Feb 10, 1997 | Dar-Es-Salaam, Tanzania | |
