= Agapito Sánchez =

Dominican Republic boxer

Personal information
- Nickname: El Ciclon
- Born: February 14, 1970 La Victoria, Dominican Republic
- Died: November 15, 2005 (aged 35) Santo Domingo, Dominican Republic
- Height: 5 ft 4 in (163 cm)
- Weight: Super flyweight; Bantamweight; Super bantamweight; Featherweight; Super featherweight

Boxing career
- Reach: 64 in (163 cm)
- Stance: Orthodox

Boxing record
- Total fights: 50
- Wins: 36
- Win by KO: 18
- Losses: 11
- Draws: 3

Agapito Sánchez (February 14, 1970 – November 15, 2005) was a boxer from the Dominican Republic, nicknamed "El Ciclón" and "Dirty Sanchez" (due to his frequent application of unsportsmanlike tactics in the ring), in the Super Bantamweight weight class. He won 37 of his 50 fights, 18 by knockout.

== Pro career ==
In 1995, Sanchez challenged WBO superbantemweight champion Marco Antonio Barrera but lost via a twelve-round unanimous decision. He also faced future champions Juan Manuel Márquez, Freddie Norwood, and Guty Espadas, Jr. but came up short in each bout. In 1998, Sanchez defeated future champion Óscar Larios via technical knockout. In 2001, he defeated Jorge Monsalvo Sánchez to win the vacant WBO Super Bantamweight title.

In his next bout, he fought then two-division world champion Manny Pacquiao in an attempt to unify the IBF and WBO junior featherweight titles. The bout was stopped in the sixth round due to a cut over Pacquiao's right eye, caused by an accidental clash of heads in the second round and made worse with another collision in the sixth. Sanchez had been docked two points; one for repeated low blows. The bout was declared a draw with scores of 58-54 Pacquiao, 57-55 Sanchez and 56-56. In August 2002 Sanchez was scheduled to defend his title against Joan Guzmán but failed a pre-fight eye test and was stripped of his crown. After a two-year layoff he fought Guzmán for the same title but lost via technical knockout.

His final bout was a win against Edison Torres on September 17, 2005.

== Professional boxing record ==
50 fights	36 wins	11 losses
By knockout	18	3
By decision	18	7
By disqualification	0	1
Draws	3	

No.	Result	Record	Opponent	Type	Round, time	Date	Location	Notes
50	Win	36–11–3	Edison Torres	UD	10 (10)	2005-09-17	Coliseo Teo Cruz, Santo Domingo, Dominican Republic	
49	Win	35–11–3	Artyom Simonyan	TKO	5 (12)	2005-07-22	Allstate Arena, Rosemont, Illinois, U.S.	Won USBA super-bantamweight title
48	Win	34–11–3	Iván Álvarez	TKO	8 (10)	2005-04-08	Hanover Marriott, Whippany, New Jersey, U.S.	
47	Loss	33–11–3	Carlos Navarro	TKO	11 (12)	Dec 11, 2004	Mandalay Bay Events Center, Paradise, Nevada, U.S.	For vacant WBC Continental Americas super-featherweight title
46	Win	33–10–3	Rogers Mtagwa	MD	10 (10)	2004-10-14	Hanover Marriott, Whippany, New Jersey, U.S.	
45	Win	32–10–3	Francisco Mateos	UD	10 (10)	2004-08-14	Gimnasio Nuevo Panama, Panama City, Panama	
44	Loss	31–10–3	Joan Guzmán	TKO	7 (12)	2004-02-26	Pechanga Arena, San Diego, California, U.S.	For WBO super-bantamweight title
43	Draw	31–9–3	Manny Pacquiao	TD	6 (12)	Nov 10, 2001	Civic Auditorium, San Francisco, California, U.S.	Retained WBO super-bantamweight title; For IBF super-bantamweight title
42	Win	31–9–2	Jorge Monsalvo	KO	7 (12)	2001-06-23	MGM Grand Garden Arena, Paradise, Nevada, U.S.	Won vacant WBO super-bantamweight title
41	Win	30–9–2	Juan Carlos Ramírez	UD	10 (10)	2000-08-19	Foxwoods Resort Casino, Ledyard, Connecticut, U.S.	
40	Win	29–9–2	Gerardo Martínez	TKO	11 (12)	2000-06-17	Arena México, Mexico City, Mexico	Won WBC FECARBOX super-bantamweight title
39	Win	28–9–2	Javier Lucas	TKO	7 (?)	1999-12-03	Pechanga Resort & Casino, Temecula, California, U.S.	
38	Win	27–9–2	Marcos Badillo	UD	10 (10)	1999-08-23	Great Western Forum, Inglewood, California, U.S.	
37	Win	26–9–2	Jesse Magana	UD	10 (10)	1999-04-12	Great Western Forum, Inglewood, California, U.S.	
36	Win	25–9–2	Rafael De la Cruz	KO	4 (?)	1999-03-29	Santo Domingo, Dominican Republic	
35	Win	24–9–2	Jorge Munoz	TD	8 (?)	1999-01-25	Arrowhead Pond, Anaheim, California, U.S.	
34	Win	23–9–2	Óscar Larios	TKO	5 (12)	1998-10-23	Hotel Costa Club, Acapulco, Mexico	Won vacant WBO Inter-Continental super-bantamweight title
33	Win	22–9–2	Nestor Lopez	UD	10 (10)	1998-08-29	Las Vegas Hilton, Winchester, Nevada, U.S.	
32	Loss	21–9–2	Guty Espadas Jr.	MD	10 (10)	1998-04-20	Great Western Forum, Inglewood, California, U.S.	
31	Win	21–8–2	Javier Jáuregui	UD	10 (10)	1998-02-21	Tropicana Hotel & Casino, Paradise, Nevada, U.S.	
30	Loss	20–8–2	Freddie Norwood	UD	12 (12)	1997-08-08	Station Casino, Kansas City, Missouri, U.S.	
29	Loss	20–7–2	César Soto	TKO	2 (10)	1997-06-06	Aladdin hotel and casino, Paradise, Nevada, U.S.	
28	Loss	20–6–2	Juan Manuel Márquez	UD	12 (12)	1997-04-21	Great Western Forum, Inglewood, California, U.S.	For NABO featherweight title
27	Win	20–5–2	Javier León	UD	10 (10)	1996-09-10	Beacon Theatre, New York City, New York, U.S.	
26	Win	19–5–2	Roland Gomez	TKO	3 (10)	1996-04-25	Pharr, Texas, U.S.	
25	Win	18–5–2	Jorge Monzon	TKO	10 (10)	1995-12-07	Harlingen, Texas, U.S.	
24	Loss	17–5–2	Marco Antonio Barrera	UD	12 (12)	1995-08-22	Convention Center, South Padre Island, Texas, U.S.	For WBO super-bantamweight title
23	Win	17–4–2	Anthony Hardy	PTS	8 (8)	1995-07-02	Washington, D.C., U.S.	
22	Win	16–4–2	José Pantaleón	UD	12 (12)	1995-04-25	Convention Center, South Padre Island, Texas, U.S.	Won vacant WBC International featherweight title
21	Loss	15–4–2	Maui Diaz	DQ	8 (12)	1994-10-29	Huntington Park, California, U.S.	Lost USBA super-bantamweight title
20	Win	15–3–2	Max Gomez	MD	12 (12)	1994-05-28	Civic Center, Lake Charles, Louisiana, U.S.	Won USBA super-bantamweight title
19	Win	14–3–2	Angel Santana	PTS	10 (10)	1993-09-02	Santo Domingo, Dominican Republic	
18	Win	13–3–2	Vinicio Rosario	KO	10 (12)	1993-06-29	Santo Domingo, Dominican Republic	Won vacant Dominican super-flyweight title
17	Win	12–3–2	Juan Francisco Mercedes	UD	10 (10)	1993-02-18	Santo Domingo, Dominican Republic	
16	Win	11–3–2	Luis Sosa	PTS	10 (10)	1992-11-06	Santo Domingo, Dominican Republic	
15	Win	10–3–2	Julio Cesar Perez	PTS	12 (12)	1992-10-16	Santo Domingo, Dominican Republic	Won vacant Dominican bantamweight title
14	Win	9–3–2	Manuel Jesus Herrera	TKO	4 (?)	1992-08-15	Santo Domingo, Dominican Republic	
13	Win	8–3–2	Andres Buchito Adames	KO	1 (?)	1992-07-04	Santo Domingo, Dominican Republic	
12	Win	7–3–2	Fenel Solano	KO	3 (?)	1992-06-25	Santo Domingo, Dominican Republic	
11	Loss	6–3–2	Domingo Guillen	PTS	8 (8)	1992-02-17	La Romana, Dominican Republic	
10	Loss	6–2–2	Luis Alberto Vargas	PTS	6 (6)	1990-11-29	Estudios de TV 2, Panama City, Panama	
9	Loss	6–1–2	Eduardo Lopez	UD	8 (8)	1990-10-07	Changuinola, Panama	
8	Win	6–0–2	Aguedo Moran	UD	6 (6)	1990-07-01	Festival del Banano, Changuinola, Panama	
7	Win	5–0–2	Eduardo Lopez	TKO	3 (?)	1990-06-01	Dominican Republic	
6	Win	4–0–2	Ariel Cordoba	KO	9 (?)	1990-05-23	Dominican Republic	
5	Win	3–0–2	Genarito Murillo	KO	1 (?)	1990-05-04	Santo Domingo, Dominican Republic	
4	Draw	2–0–2	Angel Vergara	PTS	4 (4)	1990-04-28	Gimnasio Municipal, Pacora, Panama	
3	Draw	2–0–1	Luis Alberto Vargas	SD	4 (4)	1990-03-17	Centro de Convenciones, Colón, Panama	
2	Win	2–0	Juan Rios	KO	1 (4)	1990-02-17	Gimnasio Escolar, David, Panama	
1	Win	1–0	Jose Perez	TKO	1 (4)	1989-11-25	Gimnasio Nuevo Panama, Panama City, Panama	

== Murder ==
Sánchez was pronounced dead on November 15, 2005, after being shot by an off-duty Dominican Air Force sergeant in Santo Domingo, Dominican Republic. Sanchez died at a Santo Domingo hospital hours after surgery to remove two bullets from his stomach. The police identified the murderer as Sergeant Diogenes Nova Rosario, who was later convicted and sentenced to 15 years in prison.

== See also ==
- List of world super-bantamweight boxing champions

Sporting positions
Regional boxing titles
Vacant Title last held by Julio Soto Solano	Dominican bantamweight champion October 16, 1992 – 1992; Vacated	Vacant Title next held by Vinicio Rosario
Vacant Title last held by Luis Sosa	Dominican super-flyweight champion June 29, 1993 – 1993; Vacated	Vacant Title next held by Andres Buchito Adames
Preceded by Max Gomez	USBA super-bantamweight champion May 28, 1994 – October 29, 1994; Vacated	Succeeded by Maui Diaz
Vacant Title last held by Alejandro González	WBC International featherweight champion April 25, 1995 – 1995; Vacated	Vacant Title next held by Said Lawal
Vacant Title last held by Marius Heriberto Frias	WBO Inter-Continental super-bantamweight champion October 23, 1998 – June 23, 2001; Won world title	Vacant Title next held by Joan Guzmán
Preceded by Gerardo Martínez	WBC FECARBOX super-bantamweight champion June 17, 2000 – 2001; Vacated	Vacant Title next held by Iván Álvarez
Preceded by Artyom Simonyan	USBA super-bantamweight champion July 22, 2005 – November 15, 2005; Vacant upon death	Vacant Title next held by Mike Oliver
World boxing titles
Vacant Title last held by Marco Antonio Barrera	WBO super-bantamweight champion June 23, 2001 – 2002; Stripped	Vacant Title next held by Joan Guzmán
