= José Luis Valbuena =

Venezuelan boxer

Jose Luis Valbuena
Personal information
- Born: 19 March 1971 (age 55) Turmero, Venezuela
- Weight: Featherweight

Boxing career
- Stance: Southpaw

Boxing record
- Total fights: 30
- Wins: 24
- Win by KO: 14
- Losses: 4
- Draws: 1
- No contests: 1

José Luis Valbuena (born March 19, 1971) is a former bantamweight boxer from Venezuela, who had a total number of 30 professional fights during his career. He is best known for knocking down Carlos Barreto on October 9, 1999. Three days after the bout Barreto died due to brain injuries sustained in the match. As an amateur Valbuena represented his native country at the 1995 Pan American Games in Mar del Plata, Argentina.

== Professional boxing record ==
30 fights	24 wins	4 losses
By knockout	14	2
By decision	10	2
Draws	1	
No contests	1	

No.	Result	Record	Opponent	Type	Round, time	Date	Location	Notes
30	Loss	24–4–1 (1)	Celestino Caballero	TKO	5 (12), 3:08	5 May 2005	Desert Diamond Casino, Tucson, Arizona, U.S.	
29	Loss	24–3–1 (1)	Israel Vázquez	TKO	12 (12), 0:34	25 Mar 2004	Grand Olympic Auditorium, Los Angeles, California, U.S.	For vacant IBF super bantamweight title
28	Win	24–2–1 (1)	David Donis	TKO	9 (12), 1:31	23 Oct 2003	Reliant Arena, Houston, Texas, U.S.	
27	Win	23–2–1 (1)	Julio Gamboa	UD	12	26 Mar 2003	Convention Center, Miami, Florida, U.S.	Retained IBF Latino super bantamweight title
26	Win	22–2–1 (1)	Jorge Soto	KO	1	26 Oct 2002	Centro Recreacional Yesterday, Turmero, Venezuela	
25	Win	21–2–1 (1)	Ernesto Grey	KO	12 (12)	19 Jan 2002	Cartagena, Meta Department, Colombia	Won vacant IBF Latino super bantamweight title
24	Win	20–2–1 (1)	Julián Rodríguez	UD	8	23 Jun 2001	MGM Grand Garden Arena, Paradise, Nevada, U.S.	
23	Win	19–2–1 (1)	José Pablo Estrella	RTD	8 (10), 0:01	17 Feb 2001	Nueve de Julio, Dustrito Federal, Argentina	
22	Loss	18–2–1 (1)	Marco Antonio Barrera	UD	12	9 Sep 2000	New Orleans Arena, New Orleans, Louisiana, U.S.	For WBO super bantamweight title
21	Win	18–1–1 (1)	John Alex González	TKO	3	28 Jun 2000	San Juan de los Morros, Guárico, Venezuela	
20	Win	17–1–1 (1)	Nelson Ramón Medina	KO	5	18 Mar 2000	Turmero, Aragua, Venezuela	
19	Win	16–1–1 (1)	Carlos Barreto	TKO	10	9 Oct 1999	Parque Nacional Unidas, Caracas, Venezuela	
18	Win	15–1–1 (1)	Elvis Montoya	TKO	5	19 Jun 1999	Caracas, Venezuela	
17	Win	14–1–1 (1)	Elvis Montoya	UD	10	27 Feb 1999	Caracas, Venezuela	
16	Win	13–1–1 (1)	David Sevilla	KO	1	19 Dec 1998	Palo Verde, Miranda, Venezuela	
15	Win	12–1–1 (1)	Emiliano Ferrer	KO	1	17 Aug 1998	Willemstad, Curaçao	
14	Draw	11–1–1 (1)	Carlos Barreto	PTS	10	30 Apr 1998	Caracas, Venezuela	
13	Win	11–1 (1)	David Serradas	UD	10	28 Feb 1998	Parque Miranda, Sebucán, Venezuela	
12	Win	10–1 (1)	Vicente Rivera	TKO	3	20 Dec 1997	Caracas, Venezuela	
11	Win	9–1 (1)	Elvis Montoya	UD	10	9 Dec 1997	Caracas, Venezuela	
10	Win	8–1 (1)	Fernando Blanco	UD	10	18 Oct 1997	Maracay, Aragua, Venezuela	
9	Loss	7–1 (1)	Yober Ortega	UD	12	5 May 1997	Turmero, Aragua, Venezuela	Lost Venezuelan super bantamweight title
8	Win	7–0 (1)	Antonio Osorio	UD	12	7 Mar 1997	Calabozo, Guárico, Venezuela	Won vacant Venezuelan super bantamweight title
7	Win	6–0 (1)	José Zerpa	UD	10	14 Dec 1996	Venezuela	
6	NC	5–0 (1)	Andres Antonio Adames	NC	3	31 Aug 1996	Willemstad, Curaçao	
5	Win	5–0	Aldrin Sosa	UD	10	15 Jun 1996	Los Teques, Miranda, Venezuela	
4	Win	4–0	Simón Hernández	TKO	1 (6)	29 Apr 1996	Turmero, Aragua, Venezuela	
3	Win	3–0	Richard Cerezo	UD	6	22 Apr 1996	Venezuela	
2	Win	2–0	Richard Barreto	KO	1 (4)	17 Feb 1996	Los Teques, Miranda, Venezuela	
1	Win	1–0	Juan Manuel Rojas	TKO	3 (4)	11 Nov 1995	Caracas, Venezuela	
