= Alvin Brown (boxer) =

American boxer

Alvin Brown (born September 1, 1969, in Kansas City, Missouri) is a professional American boxer in the Light Welterweight division and is the former North American Boxing Association (NABA) Featherweight champion.

== Pro career ==
In August 2006, on ESPN's Friday Night Fights Alvin lost to title contender Rogers Mtagwa. In that fight Teddy Atlas predicted the knockout would be in the fourth round.

On March 14, 2008, Brown was knocked out by Mexican American Brandon Rios in Cicero Stadium, Cicero, Illinois.
