= Rodolfo López =

Mexican boxer

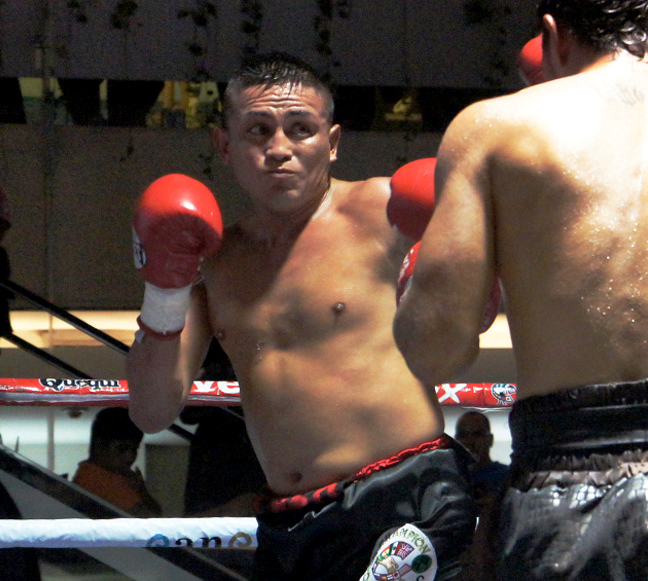
- López in 2011

Personal information
- Nickname: Rudy
- Born: Rodolfo Omar López Romero; September 18, 1983 (age 42) Cancún, Quintana Roo, Mexico
- Height: 5 ft 9 in (175 cm)
- Weight: Featherweight

Boxing career
- Stance: Orthodox

Boxing record
- Total fights: 37
- Wins: 27
- Win by KO: 18
- Losses: 6
- Draws: 2
- No contests: 2

Rodolfo Omar López Romero (born September 18, 1983) is a Mexican former professional boxer who competed from 2000 to 2014. He held the WBC featherweight title in 2006.

== Professional career ==
=== Vs. Koshimoto ===
López captured the WBC featherweight title with a victory over Takashi Koshimoto

=== Vs. Chi ===
He would lose the belt in his first defense to former champion In-Jin Chi. Scores were 117–111, 116–112 and 116–113.

== Professional boxing record ==
37 fights	27 wins	6 losses
By knockout	18	3
By decision	9	3
Draws	2	
No contests	2	

No.	Result	Record	Opponent	Type	Round, time	Date	Location	Notes
37	Win	27–6–2 (2)	Francisco Javier Lopez Chavez	KO	3 (8)	2014-11-14	Auditorio Municipal, Cabo San Lucas, Mexico	
36	Win	26–6–2 (2)	Moises Perez	TKO	6 (8)	2012-12-06	Discoteca The City, Cancun, Mexico	
35	Loss	25–6–2 (2)	Jorge Romero	TKO	4 (10)	2012-07-21	Oasis Hotel Complex, Cancun, Mexico	
34	Draw	25–5–2 (2)	Reyes Sanchez	PTS	10 (10)	2011-12-10	Gran Tlachco, Playa del Carmen, Mexico	
33	Win	25–5–1 (2)	Orlando Ramos	UD	10 (10)	2011-10-06	Plaza Kukulcán, Cancun, Mexico	
32	Loss	24–5–1 (2)	Juan Pablo Sanchez	UD	8 (8)	2011-02-26	Poliforum Zamna, Merida, Mexico	
31	Win	24–4–1 (2)	Esteban Lorenzo	RTD	8 (12)	2010-10-03	Plaza Forum, Cancun, Mexico	Won WBC Continental Americas light welterweight title
30	Win	23–4–1 (2)	Luis Enrique Jimenez	UD	8 (8)	2010-09-17	Centro de Cancun, Cancun, Mexico	
29	NC	22–4–1 (2)	Juan Pablo Sanchez	NC	3 (8)	2010-03-20	The City Discotheque, Cancun, Mexico	
28	Win	22–4–1 (1)	Jonathan Ramos	UD	8 (8)	2009-11-20	Discotheque Basic, Cancun, Mexico	
27	Win	21–4–1 (1)	Pablo Polanco Fernandez	KO	2 (6)	2009-06-06	Xcaret Park, Cancun, Mexico	
26	NC	20–4–1 (1)	Naoki Matsuda	NC	8 (12)	2007-12-15	Plaza de Toros, Cancun, Mexico	
25	Win	20–4–1	Antonio Espinales	KO	3 (10)	2007-07-28	Sindicato de Taxistas, Cancun, Mexico	
24	Loss	19–4–1	Naoki Matsuda	KO	5 (10)	2007-03-31	Centro de Cancun, Cancun, Mexico	
23	Loss	19–3–1	Chi In-jin	UD	12 (12)	2006-12-17	Chungmu Art Hall, Seoul, South Korea	Lost WBC featherweight title
22	Win	19–2–1	Takashi Koshimoto	TKO	7 (12)	2006-07-30	Marine Messe, Fukuoka, Japan	Won WBC featherweight title
21	Win	18–2–1	Fredy Blandon	KO	10 (10)	2006-01-28	Plaza de Toros, Cancun, Mexico	Retained WBC Youth World featherweight title
20	Loss	17–2–1	Carlos Garcia	KO	4 (12)	2005-12-16	Palenque de Deportes, Chetumal, Mexico	For vacant Mexican featherweight title
19	Win	17–1–1	Fredy Blandon	TKO	10 (10)	2005-10-15	Palenque de la Expo Feria, Chetumal, Mexico	Retained WBC Youth World featherweight title
18	Win	16–1–1	Humberto Martínez	KO	6 (10)	2005-07-30	Centro de Cancun, Cancun, Mexico	Retained WBC Youth World featherweight title
17	Win	15–1–1	Jesus Perez	KO	4 (10)	2005-02-18	Centro de Convenciones, Cancun, Mexico	Won vacant WBC Youth World featherweight title
16	Loss	14–1–1	Tommy Browne	SD	10 (10)	2004-10-29	State Sports Centre, Sydney, Australia	For vacant WBC Youth World featherweight title
15	Win	14–0–1	Alfredo Guarneros	TKO	6 (10)	2004-09-02	Chetumal, Mexico	
14	Win	13–0–1	Hugo Guarneros	UD	10 (10)	2004-07-02	Cancun, Mexico	
13	Win	12–0–1	Gerardo Leon	SD	10 (10)	2004-04-30	Cancun, Mexico	
12	Win	11–0–1	Israel Hernandez	TKO	1 (10)	2004-03-20	Sindicato de Taxistas, Cancun, Mexico	
11	Win	10–0–1	Luis Couoh	TKO	5 (10)	2004-01-30	Cancun, Mexico	
10	Win	9–0–1	Romulo Juarez	TKO	7 (10)	2003-09-06	Playa del Carmen, Mexico	
9	Win	8–0–1	Alejandro Lopez	TKO	7 (10)	2003-08-01	Cancun, Mexico	
8	Win	7–0–1	Manuel Estrella	UD	10 (10)	2003-03-14	Cancun, Mexico	
7	Win	6–0–1	Juan Carlos Zumarraga	UD	8 (8)	2002-12-14	Cancun, Mexico	
6	Win	5–0–1	Manuel Estrella	SD	8 (8)	2002-04-12	Cancun, Mexico	
5	Win	4–0–1	Henry Arjona	SD	8 (8)	2002-02-01	Cancun, Mexico	
4	Win	3–0–1	Franner Trinidad	KO	1 (4)	2002-01-18	Cancun, Mexico	
3	Draw	2–0–1	Roger Tellez	PTS	4 (4)	2001-09-29	Cancun, Mexico	
2	Win	2–0	Felipe Sandoval	TKO	4 (4)	2001-09-01	Cancun, Mexico	
1	Win	1–0	Juan Sanchez	TKO	3 (4)	2000-10-19	Chetumal, Mexico	

== See also ==
- List of Mexican boxing world champions
- List of world featherweight boxing champions

Sporting positions
Regional boxing titles
Vacant Title last held by Tommy Browne	WBC featherweight youth champion February 18, 2005 – 2006; Vacated	Vacant Title next held by Eduardo Escobedo
Vacant Title last held by Daniel Sandoval	WBC Continental Americas light welterweight champion October 3, 2010 – 2011; Vacated	Vacant Title next held by Mike Alvarado
World boxing titles
Preceded by Takashi Koshimoto	WBC featherweight champion July 30, 2006 – December 17, 2006	Succeeded by Chi In-jin
