= Larry Marks (boxer) =

American boxer

Personal information
- Nickname: Laser
- Born: April 13, 1972 (age 54) Selma, Alabama, U.S.
- Height: 6 ft 0 in (183 cm)
- Weight: Super middleweight

Boxing career
- Reach: 73 in (185 cm)
- Stance: Orthodox

Boxing record
- Wins: 29
- Win by KO: 16
- Losses: 10
- Draws: 1

Larry Marks (born April 13, 1972) is an American former professional boxer who competed from 1996 to 2009. He challenged for the WBA welterweight title against Andrew Lewis in 2001.

He was born in Selma, Alabama and currently lives in New Castle, Delaware.
