= Carlos Barreto (boxer) =

Venezuelan boxer

Personal information
- Born: Carlos Augusto Barreto; Hernández; July 25, 1976 Petare, Venezuela
- Died: October 12, 1999 (aged 23) Caracas, Venezuela
- Height: 5 ft 8 in (173 cm)
- Weight: Super bantamweight

Boxing career
- Stance: Southpaw

Boxing record
- Total fights: 16
- Wins: 13
- Win by KO: 9
- Losses: 2
- Draws: 1

Carlos Barreto (July 25, 1976 – October 12, 1999) was a bantamweight boxer from Venezuela, who represented his native country at the 1996 Summer Olympics in Atlanta, Georgia.

== Olympic results ==
- Defeated Aleksandar Hristov (Bulgaria) 9-3
- Lost to Vichairachanon Khadpo (Thailand) 6-14

== Pro career ==
He made his professional debut on September 21, 1996. He holds the distinction of being the first ever WBA interim champion when he beat Hector Acero Sánchez in October 1998 to win the interim super-bantamweight title. He would get a chance at becoming full champion in his next, but would get stopped in the eighth round against incumbent champion Néstor Garza. He died on October 12, 1999, three days after a bout against José Luis Valbuena in Caracas, where he collapsed after the fight and was removed on a stretcher. He died due to brain injuries sustained in the match.

== Professional boxing record ==
16 fights	13 wins	2 losses
By knockout	9	2
By decision	4	0
Draws	1	

No.	Result	Record	Opponent	Type	Round, time	Date	Location	Notes
16	Loss	13–2–1	José Luis Valbuena	TKO	10 (?)	1999-10-09	Naciones Unidas Park, Caracas, Venezuela	
15	Loss	13–1–1	Néstor Garza	TKO	8 (12)	1999-05-08	Hilton Hotel, Winchester, Nevada, U.S.	For WBA super-bantamweight title
14	Win	13–0–1	Hector Acero Sánchez	UD	12 (12)	1998-10-03	Gimnasio José Beracasa, Caracas, Venezuela	Won interim WBA super-bantamweight title
13	Win	12–0–1	Fernando Blanco	PTS	10 (10)	1998-07-14	Caracas, Venezuela	
12	Draw	11–0–1	José Luis Valbuena	PTS	10 (10)	1998-04-30	Caracas, Venezuela	
11	Win	11–0	Julio Delgado	UD	10 (10)	1998-02-28	Sebucán, Venezuela	
10	Win	10–0	Jorge Soto	KO	4 (?)	1997-12-09	Los Teques, Venezuela	
9	Win	9–0	Edgar Mendoza	KO	1 (?)	1997-10-25	Los Teques, Venezuela	
8	Win	8–0	Angel Rosario	TKO	4 (12)	1997-09-27	Gimnasio José Beracasa, Caracas, Venezuela	Won WBA Fedelatin super-bantamweight title
7	Win	7–0	Antonio Osorio	TKO	6 (?)	1997-07-12	Caracas, Venezuela	
6	Win	6–0	Elvis Montoya	PTS	8 (8)	1997-03-07	Calabozo, Venezuela	
5	Win	5–0	Nestor Armas	TKO	2 (?)	1996-12-14	Venezuela	
4	Win	4–0	Ramon Centeno	TKO	2 (?)	1996-11-23	Venezuela	
3	Win	3–0	Ignacio Hernandez	KO	1 (?)	1996-10-19	Venezuela	
2	Win	2–0	Enrique Cova	TKO	3 (?)	1996-10-07	Maracay, Venezuela	
1	Win	1–0	Juan Moreno	KO	1 (?)	1996-09-21	Petare, Venezuela	

== See also ==
- List of southpaw stance boxers
- List of deaths due to injuries sustained in boxing

Sporting positions
Regional boxing titles
Preceded by Angel Rosario	WBA Fedelatin super-bantamweight champion September 27, 1997 – 1997; Vacated	Vacant Title next held by Richard Carrillo
World boxing titles
New title	WBA super-bantamweight champion Interim title October 3, 1998 – May 8, 1999; Lost bid for full title	Vacant Title next held by Antonio Cermeño
