= Oscar De La Hoya vs. Javier Castillejo =

2001 WBC professional boxing match

The Quest
- Date: June 23, 2001
- Venue: MGM Grand Garden Arena, Paradise, Nevada, U.S.
- Title(s) on the line: WBC super welterweight title

Tale of the tape
Boxer	Javier Castillejo	Oscar De La Hoya
Nickname	El Lince de Parla ("The Lynx of Parla")	The Golden Boy
Hometown	Parla, Madrid, Spain	East Los Angeles, California, U.S.
Purse	$800,000	$5,000,000
Pre-fight record	51–4 (34 KO)	33–2 (27 KO)
Age	33 years, 3 months	28 years, 4 months
Height	5 ft 11 in (180 cm)	5 ft 10 1/2 in (179 cm)
Weight	154 lb (70 kg)	154 lb (70 kg)
Style	Orthodox	Orthodox
Recognition	WBC; Super Welterweight Champion	WBC; No. 1 Ranked Welterweight; The Ring No. 4 ranked pound-for-pound fighter 3-division world champion

Result
- De La Hoya wins via 12-round unanimous decision (119-108, 119-108, 119-108)

Oscar De La Hoya vs. Javier Castillejo, billed as The Quest, was a professional boxing match contested on June 23, 2001, for the WBC super welterweight championship.

After 12 rounds, De La Hoya defeated Castillejo to take the WBC and lineal super welterweight titles. With his win, De La Hoya then tied with Sugar Ray Leonard and Thomas Hearns as a five-division world champion.

Filipino boxer Manny Pacquiao makes his debut in the United States with his bout against Lehlohonolo Ledwaba.

== Background ==
Javier Castillejo, aged 33, was considered the underdog before his fight with 28-year-old Oscar De La Hoya, with the latter at his prime both "physically and emotionally". However Castillejo, who was making his US debut, predicted he would pull off the upset "I am going to show Oscar and the rest of the world who the champ is, and then I will be the better-known fighter and the favourite."

== The fights ==
=== Ledwaba vs. Pacquiao ===
On the undercard IBF junior featherweight champion Lehlo Ledwaba faced former flyweight champion Manny Pacquiao.

==== Background ====
At the time, Ledwaba had been ranked as one of the top pound-for-pound boxers and was scheduled to face Mexican Enrique Sánchez. However, Sanchez was injured two weeks before the undercard bout, and matchmaker Sampson Lewkowicz replaced him with Pacquiao, who would thus have his debut in the U.S.. The fight also became the first match of Pacquiao to have Freddie Roach as his coach.

==== The fight ====
Pacquiao would knock Ledwaba down three times before the referee would stop the bout in the 6th round giving him a TKO victory.

==== Aftermath ====
The fight is generally considered as a significant event for both boxers' careers.

Ledwaba considered the bout to be the most difficult fight in his career. He remarked that during the bout, he "tried almost everything. I'm a boxer who used to think. I always tried to outwork an opponent, but it was totally different against Manny. [...] I was flat-footed, but he was on his toes all the time, so he was hard to hit." His promoter Rodney Berman later expressed the thought that Ledwaba's defeat to the then-unknown Pacquiao caused him to lose motivation in boxing; Ledwaba did not have anymore world level fights after the match, and retired from the profession by 2006. For Pacquiao, he won $40,000 for his victory, and later stated that alongside his other early fights, he fondly remembers his fight against Ledwaba because "[t]hat's the one that got me here to the U.S. and after that my career really started."

Preceded by vs. Carlos Contreras	Lehlo Ledwaba's bouts 23 June 2001	Succeeded by vs. Vuyani Bungu
Preceded by vs. Foijan Prawet	Manny Pacquiao's bouts 23 June 2001	Succeeded by vs. Agapito Sánchez

=== Main Event ===
De La Hoya was able to control most of the fight and was able to knock down Castillejo in the final seconds of the fight. After 12 rounds De La Hoya won the bout via unanimous decision, with all three judges scoring the fight 119–108 in his favor.

== Aftermath ==
On October 8, 2001 it was announced that De La Hoya would defend his championship against the WBC No.1 challenger Roman Karmazin, however on November 8, 2001 it was announced the fight was cancelled due to torn cartilage in his left wrist.

== Undercard ==
Confirmed bouts:

- (United States) Jermain Taylor defeats (The Bahamas) Marvin Smith via unanimous decision.

== Broadcasting ==
Country	Broadcaster
Mexico	Televisa
Philippines	RPN 9 (Via Satellite) / IBC 13 (Replay)
United Kingdom	Sky Sports
United States	HBO

Preceded by vs. Arturo Gatti	Oscar De La Hoya's bouts 23 June 2001	Succeeded by vs. Fernando Vargas
Preceded by vs. Javier Martinez Rodriguez	Javier Castillejo's bouts 23 June 2001	Succeeded by vs. Xavier Moya
