= Naseem Hamed vs. Vuyani Bungu =

Professional boxing match

Capital Punishment
- Date: 11 March 2000
- Venue: Olympia London, London, England
- Title(s) on the line: WBO and Lineal Featherweight Championship

Tale of the tape
Boxer	Naseem Hamed	Vuyani Bungu
Nickname	Prince	The Beast
Hometown	Sheffield, South Yorkshire, UK	Mdantsane, South Africa
Pre-fight record	33–0 (29 KO)	37–2 (19 KO)
Age	26 years	33 years
Height	5 ft 4 in (163 cm)	5 ft 5 1/2 in (166 cm)
Weight	126 lb (57 kg)	125 lb (57 kg)
Style	Southpaw	Orthodox
Recognition	WBO and Lineal; Featherweight Champion; The Ring; No. 1 Ranked Featherweight	IBF; No. 1 Ranked Featherweight; The Ring; No. 4 Ranked Featherweight

Result
- Hamed wins via 4th-round knockout

Naseem Hamed vs. Vuyani Bungu, billed as Capital Punishment, was a professional boxing match contested on 11 March 2000, for the WBO and Lineal featherweight championship. The bout took place at the London Olympia.

== Background ==
In his previous fight, Naseem Hamed defeated César Soto to add the WBC featherweight championship to his own WBO version of the title. Hamed had originally hoped to keep both titles, however, at the time the WBO was not a major sanctioning body. As a result, the WBC refused to allow Hamed to hold his title with the WBO's, and he was subsequently stripped of the honor in January 2000. Shortly after Hamed's victory over Soto, his team began negotiations with former WBO super-bantamweight champion Junior Jones to be Hamed's next opponent for a scheduled March 11 fight. Jones, however, refused the terms of the contract and the fight was ultimately cancelled in January 2000. Only a week after the cancellation of the Hamed–Jones fight, it was announced that Hamed and then-current IBF super bantamweight champion Vuyani Bungu would meet instead. The fight between Hamed and Bungu had been over a year in the making, as both fighters had been two of the most successful champions in their respective weight classes. Hamed had been the WBO featherweight champion for over four years and Bungu had held the IBF super bantamweight title for over five years. Hamed, who was coming off of three consecutive lackluster performances, having gone the full 12-round distance with Wayne McCullough and César Soto and going deep into the fight with Paul Ingle before finally knocking Ingle out in the 11th round, promised that he would be "back to my best". Hamed also predicted a knockout or stoppage though he could not say when during the fight it would happen.

== The fight ==
The fight was a return to form for Hamed, who dominated over Bungu throughout the duration of the fight. Bungu tried to be aggressive but, Hamed hit Bungu with a mixture of jabs and power punches and easily won the first three rounds. In the fourth round, Hamed landed a left hand that dropped Bungu to the mat. Bungu attempted to get back up but was unable to beat referee Joe Cortez's 10 count, giving Hamed the knockout victory at 1:38 of the fourth round.

== Fight card ==
Confirmed bouts:

Weight Class	Weight		vs.		Method	Round	Time	Notes
Featherweight	126 lb	Naseem Hamed (c)	def.	Vuyani Bungu	KO	4/12		^{Note 1}
Super lightweight	140 lb	Micky Ward	def.	Shea Neary (c)	TKO	8/12		^{Note 2}
Featherweight	126 lb	Juan Carlos Ramírez	def.	Steve Robinson	KO	11/12
Super Welterweight	147 lb	Michael Jones	def.	Alan Gilbert	RTD	3/6
Cruiserweight	200 lb	Mark Hobson	def.	Nikolai Ermenkov	PTS	6/6
Heavyweight	200+ lb	Albert Sosnowski	def.	Luke Simpkin	PTS	4/4

^Note 1 For WBO Featherweight title.
^Note 2 For WBU Super Lightweight title.

== Broadcasting ==
Country	Broadcaster
United Kingdom	Sky Sports
United States	HBO

Preceded by vs. César Soto	Naseem Hamed's bouts 11 March 2000	Succeeded by vs. Augie Sanchez
Preceded by vs. Victor Llerena	Vuyani Bungu's bouts 11 March 2000	Succeeded by vs. Lehlo Ledwaba
