= Ratanachai Sor Vorapin =

Thai world champion boxer (b. 1976)

Personal information
- Nationality: (Thailand) Thai
- Born: Chaiya Pothang; November 1, 1976 (age 49) Dankhuntod, Nakhon Ratchasima, Thailand
- Height: 5 ft 5 in (165 cm)
- Weight: Super flyweight; Bantamweight

Boxing career
- Stance: Southpaw

Boxing record
- Total fights: 89
- Wins: 75
- Win by KO: 50
- Losses: 14
- Draws: 0
- No contests: 0

Ratanachai Sor Vorapin (born November 1, 1976) is a professional boxer and a former WBO bantamweight champion. He is the younger brother of Ratanapol Sor Vorapin, a former two-time IBF strawweight champion. He is considered one of the few Thai boxers who have the opportunity to fight abroad very often. Sor Vorapin has fought 16 times abroad.

== Professional career ==
After winning 6 consecutive matches, he fought Ruangroj Kiatkriangkrai for the Thai light flyweight championship where he won by unanimous decision on September 28, 1992. In his first defense of that title 73 days later, he lost to Kompayak Chor Charoen on points and tasted his first defeat. He regained it on March 26, 1994 with TKO victory over Suksawat Torboonlert in two rounds.

Sor Vorapin had his first shot at a world title on April 24, 1999 where he battled Mark Johnson for the vacant IBF super flyweight title. Unsuccessfully, he lost via unanimous decision.

He then moved up in weight where he took on Tim Austin for the IBF bantamweight title on December 15, 2001. Like his previous attempt for a world crown, Sor Vorapin lost the match in a similar fashion.

In his third world title shot, Sor Vorapin finally achieved victory. There, he won the WBO bantamweight title on May 7, 2004 with a unanimous decision win over Cruz Carbajal. He was the first Thai boxer to be crowned world champion of this institution. Following some wins in seven ordinary matches, Sor Vorapin defended his title by outpointing Mauricio Martinez on August 5, 2005. On his second title defense, however, he was TKO'd in seven rounds by Jhonny González on October 29, 2005.

He attempted to regain the title by challenging Gerry Peñalosa who won it from González. In the aftermath of the fight, Vorapin was defeated by an 8th round stoppage from Peñalosa on April 6, 2008 in the event "Invasion: Philippines vs. The World" at the Araneta Coliseum. Peñalosa knocked down the Thai thrice, in the 5th, 7th, and earlier in the eighth.

On September 14, 2008, Filipino boxer Michael Domingo scored a 9th-round technical knockout victory over Ratanachai Sor Vorapin at the New Cebu Coliseum to retain the regional World Boxing Organization Oriental bantamweight title.

== Professional boxing record ==
| 89 fights | 75 wins | 14 losses |
|---|---|---|
| By knockout | 50 | 5 |
| By decision | 25 | 8 |
| By disqualification | 0 | 1 |

| No. | Result | Record | Opponent | Type | Round, time | Date | Location | Notes |
|---|---|---|---|---|---|---|---|---|
| 89 | Loss | 75–14 | Mingcun Chen | KO | 1 (12), 2:20 | 24 Nov 2019 | Beijing, China | |
| 88 | Loss | 75–13 | Fonluang KKP | PTS | 8 | 31 Mar 2011 | Nakhon Sawan, Nakhon Sawan Province, Thailand | |
| 87 | Win | 75–12 | Yohan Jeanson | TKO | 2 (6), 0:50 | 23 Apr 2010 | Bang Bu, Samut Prakan, Thailand | |
| 86 | Loss | 74–12 | Ramie Laput | DQ | 11 (12), 1:23 | 28 May 2009 | Cebu Coliseum, Cebu City, Philippines | For WBO Inter-Continental super-bantamweight title; Sor Vorapin was DQ'd for throwing a round house kick |
| 85 | Win | 74–11 | Falazona Fidal | PTS | 6 | 13 Feb 2009 | Ban Phai, Khon Kaen, Thailand | |
| 84 | Loss | 73–11 | Michael Domingo | TKO | 9 (12), 2:58 | 14 Sep 2008 | Cebu Coliseum, Cebu City, Philippines | For WBO Oriental bantamweight title |
| 83 | Win | 73–10 | Alex Buckie | TKO | 2 (6), 1:05 | 11 Jul 2008 | Phra Padaeng Plaza, Phra Padaeng, Thailand | |
| 82 | Loss | 72–10 | Gerry Peñalosa | TKO | 8 (12), 2:31 | 6 Apr 2008 | Araneta Coliseum, Quezon City, Philippines | For WBO bantamweight title |
| 81 | Win | 72–9 | Adrianus Kaauni | KO | 2 (6) | 22 Nov 2007 | Sahatsakhan, Kalasin, Thailand | |
| 80 | Win | 71–9 | Rene Banares | RTD | 2 (6) | 21 Sep 2007 | Ban Kam-ahuan School, Mukdahan, Thailand | |
| 79 | Win | 70–9 | Roger Monserto | UD | 6 | 21 Mar 2007 | Amornsap Yuwittaya, Bangkok, Thailand | |
| 78 | Win | 69–9 | Ramil Anito | KO | 2 (6) | 30 Nov 2006 | Khao Lak Beach, Khao Lak, Thailand | |
| 77 | Win | 68–9 | Johnny Lear | TKO | 4 (12) | 16 Aug 2006 | Ban Pak Klong Beach, Prachuap Khiri Khan, Thailand | Won vacant WBO Asia Pacific bantamweight title |
| 76 | Win | 67–9 | Atsushi Kitamuri | KO | 3 (10) | 14 Jul 2006 | Nakhon Sawan, Nakhon Sawan Province, Thailand | |
| 75 | Win | 66–9 | Dozer Tobing | KO | 2 (6) | 8 Mar 2006 | Ongkharak, Nakhon Nayok, Thailand | |
| 74 | Loss | 65–9 | Jhonny González | TKO | 7 (12), 0:22 | 29 Oct 2005 | Desert Diamond Casino, Tucson, Arizona, U.S. | Lost WBO bantamweight title |
| 73 | Win | 65–8 | Pedro Malco | UD | 10 | 6 Sep 2005 | Blaisdell Center Arena, Honolulu, Hawaii, U.S. | |
| 72 | Win | 64–8 | Mauricio Martínez | MD | 12 | 5 Aug 2005 | Patong Beach, Patong, Thailand | Retained WBO bantamweight title |
| 71 | Win | 63–8 | Ayon Naranjo | UD | 6 | 19 Apr 2005 | Suanlum Night Bazar, Bangkok, Thailand | |
| 70 | Win | 62–8 | Joven Jorda | UD | 6 | 24 Mar 2005 | Central Stadium, Phrae, Thailand | |
| 69 | Win | 61–8 | Takhir Ibrahimov | TKO | 6 (10) | 1 Feb 2005 | Donjedee Memorial Ground, Suphan Buri, Thailand | |
| 68 | Win | 60–8 | Joel Bauya | UD | 6 | 19 Nov 2004 | Bang Pakong, Chachoengsao, Thailand | |
| 67 | Win | 59–8 | Lontar Simanjutak | KO | 4 | 4 Oct 2004 | Nakhon Ratchasima, Nakhon Ratchasima Province, Thailand | |
| 66 | Win | 58–8 | Rajabu Maoja | KO | 1 (10) | 26 Aug 2004 | Buriram, Buriram Province, Thailand | |
| 65 | Win | 57–8 | Rashidi Ally Kondo | KO | 2 (10) | 16 Jul 2004 | Samut Sakhon, Samut Sakhon Province, Thailand | |
| 64 | Win | 56–8 | Cruz Carbajal | UD | 12 | 7 May 2004 | Phor Koon University, Bangkok, Thailand | Won WBO bantamweight title |
| 63 | Win | 55–8 | Obote Ameme | TKO | 3 (12) | 26 Dec 2003 | Rayong, Rayong Province, Thailand | Retained WBO Asia Pacific bantamweight title |
| 62 | Win | 54–8 | Almas Asanov | UD | 12 | 3 Oct 2003 | Dan Khun Thot, Nakhon Ratchasima, Thailand | Retained WBO Asia Pacific bantamweight title |
| 61 | Win | 53–8 | Eldered Romero | TKO | 6 (12) | 4 Sep 2003 | Sukhothai, Sukhothai Province, Thailand | Retained WBO Asia Pacific bantamweight title |
| 60 | Win | 52–8 | Andre Talabessy | KO | 2 (12) | 11 Jul 2003 | Ratanathibeth, Nonthaburi, Thailand | Retained WBO Asia Pacific bantamweight title |
| 59 | Win | 51–8 | Jacob Mohlabi | KO | 1 (6) | 5 Jun 2003 | Uttaradit, Uttaradit Province, Thailand | |
| 58 | Win | 50–8 | Joven Jorda | TKO | 4 (12) | 2 May 2003 | Samut Sakhon, Samut Sakhon Province, Thailand | Retained WBO Asia Pacific bantamweight title |
| 57 | Win | 49–8 | Andries Dick | UD | 6 | 28 Mar 2003 | Takhli, Chiang Mai Province, Thailand | |
| 56 | Win | 48–8 | Gun Tinular | KO | 3 (12), 2:01 | 11 Feb 2003 | The Mall Shopping Center Taphra, Bangkok, Thailand | Won vacant WBO Asia Pacific bantamweight title |
| 55 | Win | 47–8 | Volotopo Pani | UD | 6 | 25 Dec 2002 | Pak Kret, Nonthaburi Province, Thailand | |
| 54 | Loss | 46–8 | Chris John | UD | 10 | 1 Nov 2002 | Semarang, Central Java, Indonesia | |
| 53 | Win | 46–7 | Juventus Labombom | KO | 3 (6) | 3 Oct 2002 | Dan Khun Thot, Nakhon Ratchasima, Thailand | |
| 52 | Win | 45–7 | Andy Alagenio | UD | 6 | 7 Aug 2002 | Dan Khun Thot, Nakhon Ratchasima, Thailand | |
| 51 | Win | 44–7 | Rey Llagas | UD | 8 | 7 Mar 2002 | Bang Bua Thong, Nonthaburi, Thailand | |
| 50 | Loss | 43–7 | Tim Austin | UD | 12 | 15 Dec 2001 | Foxwoods Resort Casino, Ledyard, Connecticut, U.S. | For IBF bantamweight title |
| 49 | Win | 43–6 | Danny Romero Jr. | MD | 10 | 29 Sep 2001 | Madison Square Garden, New York City, New York, U.S. | |
| 48 | Win | 42–6 | Danggur Pasaribu | KO | 7 (10) | 13 Aug 2001 | Samut Prakan, Samut Prakan Province, Thailand | Won inaugural WBO Asia Pacific super-flyweight title |
| 47 | Win | 41–6 | Agus Ekajaya | TKO | 2 | 6 Feb 2001 | Cilandak, South Jakarta, Indonesia | |
| 46 | Loss | 40–6 | Yoddamrong Sithyodthong | PTS | 10 | 2 Jan 2001 | Rayong, Rayong Province, Thailand | |
| 45 | Loss | 40–5 | Gerry Peñalosa | TKO | 6 (12) | 25 Nov 2000 | PAGCOR Grand Theater Airport Casino Filipino, Parañaque, Philippines | For WBC International super-flyweight title |
| 44 | Win | 40–4 | Bawor Sihombing | KO | 2 | 26 May 2000 | Bangkok, Thailand | |
| 43 | Win | 39–4 | Hasan Ngabalin | UD | 10 | 28 Mar 2000 | Hawaii Pronce Hotel, Honolulu, Hawaii, U.S. | |
| 42 | Win | 38–4 | Neil Caga | TKO | 2 (6) | 3 Mar 2000 | Krabi, Krabi Province, Thailand | |
| 41 | Win | 37–4 | Benjie Concepcion | KO | 1 | 28 Jan 2000 | Ratchaburi, Ratchaburi Province, Thailand | |
| 40 | Loss | 36–4 | Mark Johnson | UD | 12 | 24 Apr 1999 | MCI Center, Washington, D.C., U.S. | For vacant IBF super-flyweight title |
| 39 | Win | 36–3 | Fernando Ibarra | KO | 6 (8), 0:58 | 29 Jan 1999 | Regal Riverfront Hotel, St. Louis, Missouri, U.S. | |
| 38 | Win | 35–3 | Jesús García | KO | 2 (8), 2:39 | 18 Dec 1998 | Memorial Auditorium, Fort Lauderdale, Florida, U.S. | |
| 37 | Win | 34–3 | Joel Junio | TKO | 2 | 30 Jul 1998 | Bangkok, Thailand | |
| 36 | Win | 33–3 | Aljon Corporal | TKO | 4 | 6 Apr 1998 | Ratchaburi, Ratchaburi Province, Thailand | |
| 35 | Win | 32–3 | Somsak Sithchatchawal | PTS | 10 | 18 Feb 1998 | Bangkok, Thailand | |
| 34 | Win | 31–3 | Joey Boy Gaabon | KO | 3 (10) | 27 Dec 1097 | Provincial Military Stadium, Songkhla, Tailand | |
| 33 | Win | 30–3 | Henry Limpin | KO | 4 (6) | 30 Aug 1997 | Indoor Provincial Stadium, Nong Khai, Thailand | |
| 32 | Win | 29–3 | Maddin Slamet | KO | 3 (10) | 14 Jun 1997 | Ban Rai School, Nakhon Ratchasima, Thailand | |
| 31 | Win | 28–3 | Bienvenido Abi Abi | TKO | 4 | 22 Mar 1997 | Provincial Stadium, Saraburi, Thailand | |
| 30 | Win | 27–3 | Hasan Mabon | KO | 6 (10) | 18 Jan 1997 | Nong Bua Luamphu Provincial Stadium, Nong Bua Lamphu, Thailand | |
| 29 | Win | 26–3 | Leo Ramirez | TKO | 7 (10) | 24 Nov 1996 | Provincial Stadium, Udon Thani, Thailand | |
| 28 | Win | 25–3 | Joey Boy Gaabon | KO | 3 (10) | 28 Sep 1996 | Provincial Stadium, Prachuap Khiri Khan, Thailand | |
| 27 | Win | 24–3 | Junai Ramayana | TKO | 3 (6) | 13 Jul 1996 | Provincial Coliseum, Chiang Mai, Thailand | |
| 26 | Win | 23–3 | Maximo Barro | PTS | 10 | 18 May 1996 | Provincial Stadium, Yala, Thailand | |
| 25 | Win | 22–3 | Marcos Sánchez | PTS | 10 | 16 Mar 1996 | Sisaket, Sisaket Province, Thailand | |
| 24 | Win | 21–3 | Edgar Maghanoy | KO | 2 | 30 Dec 1995 | Army Soccer Stadium, Chiang Mai, Thailand | |
| 23 | Win | 20–3 | Julius Tarona | UD | 10 | 29 Oct 1995 | Provincial Stadium, Suphan Buri, Thailand | |
| 22 | Win | 19–3 | Junai Ramayana | KO | 3 | 15 Jul 1995 | Ayutthaya, Ayutthaya Province, Thailand | |
| 21 | Loss | 18–3 | Ricky Matulessy | PTS | 12 | 2 May 1995 | Surabaya, East Java, Indonesia | Lost IBF Inter-Continental super-flyweight title |
| 20 | Win | 18–2 | Pirus Boy | TKO | 10 (12) | 25 Feb 1995 | Zeer Shopping Center, Rangsit, Thailand | Won IBF Inter-Continental super-flyweight title |
| 19 | Win | 17–2 | Aleksandr Makhmutov | PTS | 10 | 12 Nov 1994 | University Stadium, Khon Kaen, Thailand | |
| 18 | Loss | 16–2 | Abdi Pohan | TD | 4 (12) | 6 Aug 1994 | Surabaya, East Java, Indonesia | Lost IBF Inter-Continental flyweight title |
| 17 | Win | 16–1 | Abdi Pohan | PTS | 12 | 14 May 1993 | Saraburi, Saraburi Province, Thailand | Won IBF Inter-Continental flyweight title |
| 16 | Win | 15–1 | Suksawat Torboonlert | TKO | 2 (10) | 26 Mar 1994 | Bangkok, Thailand | Won vacant Thai light-flyweight title |
| 15 | Win | 14–1 | Marcial Pelicano | KO | 1 | 27 Feb 1994 | Provincial Stadium, Phichit, Thailand | |
| 14 | Win | 13–1 | Bernardo Belamucho | KO | 1 | 10 Dec 1994 | Provincial Stadium, Suphan Buri, Thailand | |
| 13 | Win | 12–1 | Fernando Baja | PTS | 10 | 26 Sep 1993 | Hua Mark Indoor Stadium, Bangkok, Thailand | |
| 12 | Win | 11–1 | Marlon Carillo | TKO | 7 | 4 Sep 1993 | Thailand | |
| 11 | Win | 10–1 | Chakarat Yuthakij | KO | 7 (10) | 14 Jul 1993 | Thailand | Won vacant Thai super-flyweight title |
| 10 | Win | 9–1 | Suksawat Torboonlert | PTS | 6 | 19 May 1993 | Thailand | |
| 9 | Win | 8–1 | Ngernthai Sorthanikul | TKO | 3 | 14 Mar 1993 | Suranaree Camp Stadium, Nakhon Ratchasima, Thailand | |
| 8 | Loss | 7–1 | Kompayak Chor Charoen | PTS | 10 | 10 Dec 1992 | National Stadium Gymnasium, Bangkok, Thailand | Lost Thai light-flyweight title |
| 7 | Win | 7–0 | Nokinsee Ohyutanakorn | TKO | 4 | 16 Nov 1992 | Thailand | |
| 6 | Win | 6–0 | Ruangroj Kiatkriangkrai | PTS | 10 | 28 Sep 1992 | Rajadamnern Stadium, Bangkok, Thailand | Won vacant Thai light-flyweight title |
| 5 | Win | 5–0 | Ruangroj Kiatkriangkrai | TKO | 3 | 19 Aug 1992 | Thailand | |
| 4 | Win | 4–0 | Utto Surasak | TKO | 2 | 26 Jul 1992 | Thailand | |
| 3 | Win | 3–0 | Vihok Jockygym | PTS | 6 | 22 Jun 1992 | Thailand | |
| 2 | Win | 2–0 | Makampetch Kiatsakda | TKO | 2 | 10 May 1992 | Thailand | |
| 1 | Win | 1–0 | Wittaya Por Tawatchai | KO | 1 (6) | 19 Apr 1992 | Bangkok, Thailand | |

== Life after boxing ==
After retirement, he has worked as an assistant trainer at his former boxing gym Sor Vorapin. Currently, he earns his living as a motorcycle taxi driver.

== See also ==
- List of bantamweight boxing champions

Achievements
| Preceded by Cruz Carbajal | WBO bantamweight champion May 7, 2004 - October 29, 2005 | Succeeded by Jhonny González |
