= Michael Domingo =

Filipino boxer

Personal information
- Nickname: Bruce Lee
- Nationality: (Philippines) Filipino
- Born: Michael Barroa Domingo; August 23, 1979 (age 47) Lebak, Sultan Kudarat, Philippines
- Height: 5 ft 3 in (1.60 m)
- Weight: Bantamweight

Boxing career
- Stance: Orthodox

Boxing record
- Total fights: 58
- Wins: 41
- Win by KO: 19
- Losses: 15
- Draws: 2

Michael "Bruce Lee" Domingo (born August 23, 1979 in Lebak, Sultan Kudarat, Philippines) is a Filipino retired professional boxer and currently a boxing coach.

== Professional career ==
On September 14, 2008, Domingo took on Thai boxer Ratanachai Sor Vorapin, who gave former WBO champion Gerry Peñalosa a hard time before being stopped in the 8th round a few months before at the Araneta Coliseum. The fight was part of the “Daytime Boxing” fight card at the Cebu Coliseum. Domingo was trained by former boxer Edito “Ala” Villamor. The Filipino boxer scored a 9th-round technical knockout victory over Vorapin to retain the regional World Boxing Organization, Oriental bantamweight title.

Domingo was scheduled to fight Luis Melendez of Colombia, known for his fight with Filipino boxer Z Gorres on May 1, 2010. The Domingo-Melendez bout was the main event of the card billed as “HANGAD NA PAGHIHIGANTI” (Dream Vendetta) and was supposed to be held on May 1, 2010, at the Waterfront Hotel in Lahug, Cebu City. However, the match was postponed to May 23.

Domingo was looking for a knockout win in this fight, to avenge Gorres' loss. After being knocked down by Melendez in the last round of his unanimous decision win, Gorres collapsed and was sent to the hospital for emergency neurosurgery. When asked upon the fight, Domingo said: “I am very happy to be given this opportunity to fight Melendez. I want to show the world that we Filipinos do not back away from a fight." He also added: “This fight is personal. This fight is a very emotional one for me. I cried when I learned what happened to Gorres. I want to show Gorres what I can do.”

Domingo came in at 119 pound during the official weigh-in. The Filipino boxer won the bout by KO in the 2nd round. After the win Domingo turned into his friend Z Gorres, who was seating at the ringside. In his next fight, he faced Vusi Malinga in an IBF Bantamweight Title eliminator bout in South Africa. Domingo lost the bout by majority decision.

In the PINOY PRIDE: Battle of Cebu, Michael Domingo make another knock out against Richard Samosir, of Semarang, Indonesia. Michael Domingo dominated the fight applying pressure and meaningful shot. After round six the referee called the RTD (retired) after Richard Samosir signaled in his corner. Making it a history of 41 wins and 19 knock outs. The event held at Hoops Dome, Lapu-Lapu City, Cebu, Philippines.

His last bout was on October 20, 2012.

He now works as a boxing coach.

== Professional boxing record ==
63 fights	42 wins	18 losses
By knockout	23	7
By decision	19	11
Draws	3	

No.	Result	Record	Opponent	Opponent's Pre-fight record	Type	Round, Time	Date	Location	Notes
63	Win	42–18–3	Mudde Robinson Ntambi	19–2–1	TKO	2 (8), 2:04	20 Oct 2012	MOA Arena, Pasay, Philippines	
62	Win	41–18–3	Marvin Tampus	27–14–2	KO	1 (8), 1:28	3 Mar 2012	Carlos P. Garcia Sports Complex, Tagbilaran City, Philippines	
61	Loss	40–18–3	Drian Francisco	20–1–1	UD	10	23 Sep 2011	Makati Coliseum, Makati City, Philippines	
60	Win	40–17–3	Richard Samosir	18–3–3	RTD	6 (10), 3:00	30 Jul 2011	Hoops Dome, Lapu-Lapu City, Philippines	
59	Loss	38–17–3	Vusi Malinga	19–3–1	UD	12	30 Oct 2010	North West University Hall, Mafikeng, South Africa	IBF bantamweight title eliminator
58	Win	39–16–3	Luis Melendez	26–5–1	KO	2 (10), 1:39	23 May 2010	Cebu City Waterfront Hotel & Casino, Cebu City, Philippines	
57	Win	38–16–3	José Navarro	26–4	RTD	7 (10)	3 Oct 2009	Cuneta Coliseum, Pasay City, Philippines	
56	Win	37–16–3	Monico Laurente	17–4	UD	10	14 Mar 2009	Cebu City Waterfront Hotel & Casino, Cebu City, Philippines	
55	Win	36–16–3	Ratanachai Sor Vorapin	73–10	TKO	9 (12) 2:58	14 Sep 2008	Cebu Coliseum, Cebu City	Retained WBO Oriental bantamweight title
54	Win	35–16–3	Rivo Rengkung	28–6–5	KO	2 (12), 0:46	26 Jul 2008	Cebu Coliseum, Cebu City, Philippines	Won WBO Oriental bantamweight title
53	Win	34–16–3	Thepminit Sor Chitpattana	18–2	TKO	2 (12), 1:08	6 Apr 2008	Araneta Coliseum, Quezon City, Philippines	
52	Win	33–16–3	Anthony Mathias	21–7–1	UD	10	2 Dec 2007	Araneta Coliseum, Quezon City, Philippines	
51	Win	32–16–3	Roger Galicia	24–8–3	KO	5 (12) 2:02	13 Oct 2007	Calape Sports Center, Calape, Philippines	Retained PGAB bantamweight title
50	Win	31–16–3	Miguel Román	22–0	UD	6	11 Aug 2007	Arco Arena, Sacramento, United States of America	
49	Loss	30–16–3	Kazuyuki Ichikawa	8–1–2	SD	6	13 Jan 2007	Korakuen Hall, Tokyo, Japan	
48	Win	30-15-3	Edgar Gabejan	13-12-0	MD	12	8 Dec 2006	Talisay City Sports Complex, Talisay City, Philippines	Retained PGAB bantamweight title
47	Loss	29–15–3	Frederic Patrac	19–7–1	KO	9 (12) ?	3 Oct 2006	Palais des Sports, Agde, France	For WBF bantamweight title
46	Win	29-14-3	Johnny Lear	18–11–1	SD	12	15 Jul 2006	Ringside Boxing Club, Metropolis Mall, Muntinlupa City, Philippines	Retained PGAB bantamweight title
45	Win	28–14–3	Alejandro Montiel	51–6	TKO	7 (10), 1:04	2 Jul 2006	Araneta Coliseum, Quezon City, Philippines	
44	Win	27-14-3	Roger Galicia	23–7–3	TKO	9 (12), 0:55	3 Feb 2006	Roosevelt Ave. & Del Monte Ave. Larga Pedrista, Quezon City, Philippines	Retained PGAB bantamweight title
43	Win	26–14–3	Rolly Lunas	20–5	UD	12	29 Oct 2005	Mandaue City Sports & Cultural Complex, Mandaue City, Philippines	Retained PGAB bantamweight title
42	Win	25–14–3	Joel Bauya	16–7–3	TD	9 (12)	30 Jul 2005	San Andres Civic & Sports Center, Manila, Philippines	Won PGAB bantamweight title
41	Win	24-14-3	Lontar Simanjuntak	2–4	UD	10	21 Jun 2005	RCTI Studio, Jakarta, Indonesia	
40	Win	23–14–3	Hengky Wuwungan	19–2–1	TKO	8 (10)	22 May 2005	RCTI Studio, Jakarta, Indonesia	
39	Win	22–14–3	Juan Saparipan	5–2–1	TKO	7 (10)	7 May 2005	RCTI Studio, Jakarta, Indonesia	
38	Win	21–14–3	Joiric Gan	Debut	KO	1 (12), 2:08	28 Feb 2005	Seoul, South Korea	
37	Loss	20–14–3	Poonsawat Kratingdaenggym	18–0	UD	12	26 Oct 2004	Central Stadium, Nakhon Phanom, Thailand	For PABA bantamweight title
36	Loss	20–13–3	Teerapong Kaewnongsamet	15–0	UD	12	12 Jul 2004	Klongtoey District, Bangkok, Thailand	For IBF Pan Pacific bantamweight title
35	Win	20–12–3	Seung Suk Chae	8–0	UD	10	31 May 2004	University Gym, Bucheon, South Korea	
34	Loss	19–12–3	Jorge Linares	8–0	UD	10	1 May 2004	Korakuen Hall, Tokyo, Japan	
33	Win	19–11–3	Jerome Arsolon	7–4	TKO	8 (10), 3:00	29 Feb 2004	Mexico, Pampanga, Philippines	
32	Win	18–11–3	Orlando Padillo	17–8–1	UD	10	28 Dec 2003	Mexico Coliseum, Mexico, Pampanga, Philippines	
31	Loss	17–11–3	Wethya Sakmuangklang	54–4	UD	6	25 Nov 2003	Panthum Thani, Thailand	
30	Loss	17–10–3	Ryuichi Minoriyama	13–4–3	UD	10	23 Sep 2003	City Sogo Gym, Takasago, Japan	
29	Win	17–9–3	Jake Verano	7–0–1	KO	3 (10), 2:58	23 Aug 2003	Almendras Gym, Davao City, Philippines	
28	Win	16–9–3	Rogelio Plomeda	4–0	TKO	5 (10), 1:46	26 Jul 2003	Mandaue City Sports and Cultural Center, Mandaue City, Philippines	
27	Loss	15–9–3	Alvin Felicilda	16–11–2	UD	10	14 Jun 2003	Malaybalay City, Bukidnon, Philippines	
26	Loss	15–8–3	Kozo Ishii	30–3	UD	10	27 Apr 2003	Park Arena, Komaki, Japan	
25	Draw	15–7–3	Hiroyasu Hasebe	5–1–2	SD	8	23 Feb 2003	Singu Sports Center, Hyogo, Japan	
24	Loss	15–7–2	Naoto Fujiwara	12–2	KO	5 (10) 2:26	15 Dec 2002	Prefectural Gym, Osaka, Japan	
23	Win	15–6–2	Jaime Barcelona	19–16–1	UD	8	26 Oct 2002	Rizal Memorial Colleges (RMC) Gym, Davao City, Philippines	
22	Win	14–6–2	Christopher Balug	3–0	KO	5 (10)	17 Aug 2002	Aly Sports Arena, General Santos City, Philippines	
21	Win	13–6–2	Jaime Acerda	7–7	TD	9 (10)	24 May 2002	Cabanglasan, Bukidnon, Philippines	
20	Loss	12–6–2	Jimrex Jaca	14–0	UD	10	27 Apr 2002	Waterfront Cebu City Hotel & Casino, Cebu City, Philippines	
19	Win	12–5–2	Jaime Acerda	7–6	UD	10	18 Feb 2002	Ceburan Park, Jose Abad Santos, Philippines	
18	Loss	11–5–2	Somsak Sithchatchawal	25–1–1	KO	3 (12)	27 Dec 2001	Bangkok, Thailand	
17	Win	11–4–2	Rey Villamor	24–10–2	TKO	4 (12), 1:15	15 Dec 2001	Lebak, Sultan Kudarat, Philippines	Won PBF bantamweight title
16	Loss	10–4–2	Sod Kokietgym	1–0	KO	8 (10)	3 Oct 2001	Dan Khun Thot, Thailand	For WBO Asia Pacific super-bantamweight title
15	Win	10–3–2	Junnie Gaabon	9–13–2	KO	2 (10), 2:25	16 Jul 2001	Barangay Mangagoy, Bislig, Philippines	
14	Loss	9–3–2	Joseph Paden	36–22–1	TKO	8 (10)	27 Apr 2001	Gold City Cockpit Arena, Cagayan de Oro, Philippines	
13	Win	9–2–2	Richard Cabillo	2–4–1	UD	10	15 Jan 2001	San Isidro (Kaputian), Island Garden City of Samal, Philippines	
12	Loss	8–2–2	Jimrex Jaca	5–0	KO	3 (6), 2:32	6 Oct 2000	Cainta, Rizal, Philippines	
11	Win	8–1–2	Al Balasabas	Debut	UD	6	25 Sep 2000	Barangay Bagong Pag-asa, Quezon City, Philippines	
10	Win	7–1–2	Allan Balagao	0–2–1	UD	6	14 Jul 2000	Almendras Gym, Davao City, Philippines	
9	Win	6–1–2	Richard Cabillo	1–2	TD	5 (8)	15 Jun 2000	Kitaotao, Bukidnon, Philippines	
8	Win	5–1–2	Mervin Batolina	1–0	TKO	2 (4), 1:10	29 Apr 2000	Tarlac City, Tarlac, Philippines	
7	Win	4–1–2	Roberto Aguilar	Debut	TKO	2 (4), 2:04	17 Mar 2000	Barangay Parang, Marikina, Philippines	
6	Draw	3–1–2	Ricky Peter Dionio	16–8–2	MD	6	5 Mar 2000	Norala, Cotabato del Sur, Philippines	
5	Win	3–1–1	Richard Cabillo	Debut	TKO	1 (4), 2:57	27 Feb 2000	Valencia City, Bukidnon, Philippines	
4	Loss	2–1–1	Joey Feraren	1–0	TKO	1 (6), 1:41	7 Dec 1999	Antipolo, Rizal, Philippines	
3	Win	2–0–1	Noli Sarmiento	1–2–1	UD	6	2 Dec 1999	Imus Plaza Covered Court, Imus, Philippines	
2	Win	1–0–1	Ricky Maestre	0–2	UD	4	26 Nov 1999	Barangay Tanong, Marikina, Philippines	
1	Draw	0–0–1	Juan Dindovja	4–4–1	MD	4	19 Nov 1999	Barangay Tugatog, Malabon, Philippines	
