= Vusi Malinga =

South African boxer

Personal information
- Nickname: Marvellous
- Nationality: South African
- Born: Vus'Umuzi Malinga; 29 October 1979 (age 46) Katlehong, Gauteng, South Africa
- Height: 1.70 m (5 ft 7 in)
- Weight: Bantamweight; Super-bantamweight

Boxing career
- Reach: 180 cm (71 in)
- Stance: Southpaw

Boxing record
- Total fights: 28
- Wins: 21
- Win by KO: 12
- Losses: 6
- Draws: 1

Vus'Umuzi Malinga (born 29 October 1979), best known as Vusi Malinga, is a South African professional boxer. He has challenged three times for a bantamweight world title, in 2009, 2012 and 2013.

== Professional career ==
=== Malinga vs. Sahaprom ===
On 12 June 2008 Malingo fought former two-time bantamweight world champion Veeraphol Sahaprom in an eliminator for the right to fight for the WBC world title and won by technical knockout.

=== Malinga vs. Hasegawa ===
On 12 March 2009 Malinga fought Hozumi Hasegawa for the WBC world title where he lost by technical knockout.

=== Malinga vs. Domingo ===
On 30 October 2010 Malinga fought Michael Domingo in an eliminator for the right to fight for the IBF world title and won by unanimous decision.

=== Malinga vs. Santa Cruz ===
On 2 June 2012 Malinga fought Leo Santa Cruz for the vacant IBF world title where he lost by unanimous decision. This bout was aired on Showtime.

=== Malinga vs. Hall ===
On 21 December 2013 Malinga fought Stuart Hall for the vacant IBF world title and lost by unanimous decision.

== Professional boxing record ==
| 28 fights | 21 wins | 6 losses |
|---|---|---|
| By knockout | 12 | 1 |
| By decision | 9 | 5 |
| Draws | 1 | |

| No. | Result | Record | Opponent | Type | Round, time | Date | Location | Notes |
|---|---|---|---|---|---|---|---|---|
| 28 | Loss | 21–6–1 | Gavin McDonnell | UD | 12 | 25 Oct 2014 | Hull Arena, Hull, England | For vacant WBO Inter-Continental super-bantamweight title |
| 27 | Loss | 21–5–1 | Stuart Hall | UD | 12 | 21 Dec 2013 | First Direct Arena, Leeds, England | For vacant IBF bantamweight title |
| 26 | Win | 21–4–1 | Diarh Gabutan | UD | 12 | 23 Mar 2013 | Carnival City Casino, Brakpan, South Africa | |
| 25 | Loss | 20–4–1 | Léo Santa Cruz | UD | 12 | 2 Jun 2012 | Home Depot Center, Carson, California, US | For vacant IBF bantamweight title |
| 24 | Win | 20–3–1 | Michael Domingo | UD | 12 | 30 Oct 2010 | North-West University Great Hall, Mahikeng, South Africa | |
| 23 | Win | 19–3–1 | Fadhili Majiha | KO | 3 (12), 2:28 | 25 Sep 2009 | Nasrec Indoor Arena, Johannesburg, South Africa | Won vacant WBO Africa bantamweight title |
| 22 | Loss | 18–3–1 | Hozumi Hasegawa | TKO | 1 (12), 2:37 | 12 Mar 2009 | World Memorial Hall, Kobe, Japan | For WBC bantamweight title |
| 21 | Win | 18–2–1 | Veeraphol Sahaprom | TKO | 4 (12), 0:36 | 12 Jun 2008 | Bodindecha School, Bangkok, Thailand | Won vacant WBC interim bantamweight title |
| 20 | Win | 17–2–1 | Sergio Victor Caruso | TKO | 5 (12) | 30 Nov 2007 | Carousel Casino, Hammanskraal, South Africa | Retained WBC International bantamweight title |
| 19 | Win | 16–2–1 | Alberto Rossel | KO | 5 (12), 2:50 | 24 Aug 2007 | Nasrec Indoor Arena, Johannesburg, South Africa | Retained WBC International bantamweight title |
| 18 | Draw | 15–2–1 | Jerope Mercado | SD | 12 | 2 Feb 2007 | Nasrec Indoor Arena, Johannesburg, South Africa | Retained WBC International bantamweight title |
| 17 | Win | 15–2 | Andrey Kostin | UD | 12 | 31 Mar 2006 | Wembley Indoor Arena, Johannesburg, South Africa | Retained WBC International bantamweight title |
| 16 | Win | 14–2 | Nkosinathi Tshinavhe | KO | 10 (12), 2:53 | 30 Sep 2005 | Graceland Hotel Casino, Secunda, South Africa | Won vacant WBC International bantamweight title |
| 15 | Win | 13–2 | Siyabonga Nyanga | SD | 12 | 30 Jul 2004 | Community Hall, Orlando, South Africa | Retained South African bantamweight title |
| 14 | Win | 12–2 | Joel Bauya | TKO | 1 (12) | 30 Apr 2004 | Nasrec Indoor Arena, Johannesburg, South Africa | Retained WBC International bantamweight title |
| 13 | Win | 11–2 | Lindile Somthi | TKO | 1 (12) | 31 Oct 2003 | Wembley Indoor Arena, Johannesburg, South Africa | Retained South African bantamweight title; Won vacant WBC International bantamweight title |
| 12 | Win | 10–2 | Siyabonga Nyanga | UD | 12 | 30 May 2003 | Wembley Indoor Arena, Johannesburg, South Africa | Retained South African bantamweight title |
| 11 | Win | 9–2 | Zolani Msolo | TKO | 1 (12) | 4 Oct 2002 | Emperors Palace Hotel, Kempton Park, South Africa | Retained South African bantamweight title |
| 10 | Win | 8–2 | Cedric Conway | TKO | 3 (12) | 27 Jul 2002 | Carnival City Casino, Brakpan, South Africa | Won South African bantamweight title |
| 9 | Win | 7–2 | Moses Malebye | PTS | 10 | 22 Mar 2002 | Portuguese Hall, Johannesburg, South Africa | Won vacant Gauteng bantamweight title |
| 8 | Win | 6–2 | Mzwandile Zangqa | KO | 2 (6) | 14 Oct 2001 | Graceland Hotel Casino, Secunda, South Africa | |
| 7 | Win | 5–2 | Alfred Sebaka | TKO | 5 (6) | 6 Aug 2001 | Emperors Palace Hotel, Kempton Park, South Africa | |
| 6 | Win | 4–2 | Elias Skosana | PTS | 6 | 24 Jun 2001 | Graceland Hotel Casino, Secunda, South Africa | |
| 5 | Win | 3–2 | Jacob Mohlabi | PTS | 6 | 5 May 2001 | Kopanong Community Hall, Benoni, South Africa | |
| 4 | Win | 2–2 | Bethuel Machedi | TKO | 1 (6) | 25 Mar 2001 | Sam Hlalele Community Hall, Tembisa, South Africa | |
| 3 | Loss | 1–2 | Sonnyboy Magazi | PTS | 4 | 12 Nov 2000 | Graceland Hotel Casino, Secunda, South Africa | |
| 2 | Win | 1–1 | Sekete Kolisang | PTS | 4 | 15 Apr 2000 | Saul Tsotetsi Sports Centre, Sebokeng, South Africa | |
| 1 | Loss | 0–1 | Godfrey Takalani | PTS | 4 | 20 Feb 2000 | Wembley Indoor Arena, Johannesburg, South Africa | Professional debut |

Sporting positions
Regional boxing titles
| Preceded by Cedric Conway | South African bantamweight champion 27 July 2002 – November 2004; Vacated | Vacant Title next held by Khulile Makeba |
| Vacant Title last held by Roger Galicia | WBC International bantamweight champion 31 October 2003 – July 2004; Vacated | Vacant Title next held by Himself |
| Vacant Title last held by Himself | WBC International bantamweight champion 30 September 2005 – 12 June 2008; Won eliminator for world title | Vacant Title next held by Nick Otieno |
| Vacant Title last held by Sumaila Badu | WBO Africa bantamweight champion 25 September 2009 – April 2010; Vacated | Vacant Title next held by Paulus Ambunda |
