= Cruz Carbajal =

Mexican boxer (born 1974)

Personal information
- Nickname: Cucho
- Born: 3 May 1974 (age 52) Veracruz, Mexico
- Height: 1.65 m (5 ft 5 in)
- Weight: Super flyweight; Bantamweight; Super bantamweight

Boxing career
- Reach: 165 cm (65 in)
- Stance: Orthodox

Boxing record
- Total fights: 53
- Wins: 32
- Win by KO: 26
- Losses: 19
- Draws: 2
- No contests: 0

Cruz Carbajal (born 3 May 1974) is a Mexican former professional boxer who competed from 1992 to 2012. He is the younger brother of Hall of Fame boxer Michael Carbajal. Carbajal may have his last name spelled as "Carvajal", as he stated he prefers the Spanish spelling of his last name instead.

== Professional career ==
After making his debut in 1992, Carbajal won 14 of his first 17 fights. He suffered six consecutive losses mid-way through his career, including decisions to future world champions Johnny Bredahl, Lehlohonolo Ledwaba and Néstor Garza, and knockout losses to Samson Dutch Boy Gym and Julio Ceja.

=== WBO bantamweight title ===
Carbajal captured the WBO bantamweight title from Mauricio Martinez in March 2002. He made two successful defences of the title, against Danny Romero and Gerardo Espinoza, before losing it to Ratanachai Sor Vorapin.

== Professional boxing record ==
53 fights	32 wins	19 losses
By knockout	26	6
By decision	6	13
Draws	2	

No.	Result	Record	Opponent	Type	Round, time	Date	Location	Notes
53	Loss	32–19–2	Julio Ceja	KO	3 (10), 0:44	28 Apr 2012	Grand Oasis Arena, Cancún, Mexico	
52	Win	32–18–2	Pablo Torres	UD	10	1 Oct 2011	Centro de Expositores, Puebla, Mexico	
51	Win	31–18–2	Nahum Cerón Cruz	RTD	2 (8), 0:10	10 Jul 2011	Auditorio Benito Juárez, Veracruz, Mexico	
50	Win	30–18–2	Miguel Ángel González	SD	10	16 Apr 2011	World Trade Center, Boca del Río, Mexico	
49	Loss	29–18–2	Germán Meraz	UD	8	24 Oct 2009	World Trade Center, Boca del Río, Mexico	
48	Loss	29–17–2	Z Gorres	RTD	6 (10), 0:10	12 Sep 2009	Palenque de la Feria, Tepic, Mexico	
47	Loss	29–16–2	Leonilo Miranda	KO	8 (10), 2:31	19 Jul 2008	Explanada Tecate, Navojoa, Mexico	
46	Win	29–15–2	Óscar Olivas	KO	9 (10)	30 May 2008	Poliforo Juan Gabriel, Ciudad Juárez, Mexico	
45	Loss	28–15–2	Olivier Lontchi	UD	12	10 Nov 2007	Montreal Casino, Montreal, Canada	For vacant WBA-NABA and WBO-NABO super bantamweight titles
44	Loss	28–14–2	Mike Oliver	UD	12	18 Jul 2007	The Castle, Boston, Massachusetts, U.S.	
43	Draw	28–13–2	Eric Aiken	SD	10	16 Mar 2007	Rockingham Park, Salem, New Hampshire, U.S.	
42	Win	28–13–1	Alberto Chuc Uicab	TKO	5 (10), 2:01	9 Nov 2006	El Foro, Tijuana, Mexico	
41	Win	27–13–1	Paulino villalobos	TKO	3 (10), 1:47	5 Oct 2006	Community Concourse Golden Hall, San Diego, California, U.S.	
40	Win	26–13–1	Miguel Martínez	TKO	2 (8), 0:21	24 Aug 2006	El Foro, Tijuana, Mexico	
39	Loss	25–13–1	Silence Mabuza	UD	12	13 May 2005	Plaza Hotel & Casino, Las Vegas, Nevada, U.S.	For IBO bantamweight title
38	Win	25–12–1	Jorge Lacierva	RTD	6 (12), 3:00	4 Mar 2005	Pechanga Resort Casino, Temecula, California, U.S.	
37	Loss	24–12–1	Ratanachai Sor Vorapin	UD	12	7 May 2004	Phor Koon University, Bangkok, Thailand	Lost WBO bantamweight title
36	Win	24–11–1	Gerardo Espinoza	TKO	8 (12), 1:07	4 Oct 2003	Mandalay Bay, Paradise, Nevada, U.S.	Retained WBO bantamweight title
35	Win	23–11–1	Steve Dotse	RTD	2 (10), 3:00	12 Apr 2003	MGM Grand Garden Arena, Paradise, Nevada, U.S.	
34	Win	22–11–1	Danny Romero Jr.	RTD	4 (12), 3:00	27 Sep 2002	Isleta Hotel & Casino, Albuquerque, New Mexico, Mexico	Retained WBO bantamweight title
33	Win	21–11–1	Mauricio Martínez	KO	9 (12), 1:35	15 Mar 2002	Estadio Beto Ávila, Veracruz, Mexico	Won WBO bantamweight title
32	Win	20–11–1	Hugo Dianzo	SD	12	17 Aug 2001	Ciudad Juárez, Chihuahua, Mexico	Retained Mexican bantamweight title
31	Win	19–11–1	Alejandro Estrada	TKO	6 (12)	31 Mar 2001	Poliforo Juan Gabriel, Ciudad Juárez, Mexico	Won Mexican bantamweight title
30	Loss	18–11–1	Akihiro Kanai	MD	10	18 Dec 2000	Prefectural Gymnasium, Osaka, Japan	
29	Loss	18–10–1	Fernando Montiel	TKO	4	14 Apr 2000	Los Mochis, Sinaloa, Mexico	
28	Loss	18–9–1	Francisco Mateos	UD	12	4 Dec 1999	Arena México, Mexico City, Mexico	
27	Win	18–8–1	Adonis Cruz	UD	10	27 Feb 1999	Gimnasio La Salle, Managua, Nicaragua	
26	Win	17–8–1	José Guadalupe Gastélum	TKO	5	26 Sep 1998	Mexico City, Distrito Federal, Mexico	
25	Win	16–8–1	Genaro García	TKO	8	18 Jul 1998	Mexico City, Distrito Federal, Mexico	
24	Win	15–8–1	Alejandro Medina	KO	1	29 May 1998	Veracruz, Veracruz, Mexico	
23	Loss	14–8–1	Johnny Bredahl	UD	8	13 Feb 1998	Falconer Centeret, Copenhagen, Denmark	
22	Loss	14–7–1	Néstor Garza	PTS	12	5 Dec 1997	Reynosa, Tamaulipas, Mexico	For vacant WBO-NABO super bantamweight title
21	Loss	14–6–1	Hugo Dianzo	UD	10	11 Oct 1997	Mexico City, Distrito Federal, Mexico	
20	Loss	14–5–1	Sergio Millan	SD	12	19 Jul 1997	Mexico City, Distrito Federal, Mexico	For WBC Continental Americas bantamweight title
19	Loss	14–4–1	Samson Dutch Boy Gym	KO	4 (12), 1:21	7 Mar 1997	Central Stadium, Loei, Thailand	For WBF super flyweight title
18	Loss	14–3–1	Lehlo Ledwaba	UD	12	17 Nov 1996	Nasrec Indoor Arena, Johannesburg, South Africa	For vacant WBU bantamweight title
17	Win	14–2–1	Víctor Ochoa	KO	2	12 Sep 1996	Mexico City, Distrito Federal, Mexico	
16	Loss	13–2–1	Gerardo Martínez	KO	6 (10)	15 Jun 1996	Mexico City, Distrito Federal, Mexico	
15	Win	13–1–1	José Francisco Sarabia	KO	9	17 Feb 1996	Mexico City, Distrito Federal, Mexico	
14	Loss	12–1–1	Néstor López	PTS	10	30 Sep 1995	Mérida, Yucatán, Mexico	
13	Win	12–0–1	José Luis Bueno	KO	2	29 Jul 1995	Mérida, Yucatán, Mexico	
12	Win	11–0–1	Víctor Ochoa	KO	3	19 May 1995	Tuxtepec, Oaxaca, Mexico	
11	Win	10–0–1	Jesse Miranda	PTS	8	22 Mar 1995	Scottsdale, Arizona, U.S.	
10	Win	9–0–1	Marius Heriberto Frías	SD	6	20 Feb 1995	Great Western Forum, Inglewood, California, U.S.	
9	Win	8–0–1	Alcibiades Gallegos	KO	1	1 Oct 1994	Mérida, Yucatán, Mexico	
8	Draw	7–0–1	Néstor López	PTS	8	21 May 1994	Mérida, Yucatán, Mexico	
7	Win	7–0	Fernando Velazco	KO	3	15 Apr 1994	Xalapa, Veracruz, Mexico	
6	Win	6–0	Herminio Flores	KO	3	25 Feb 1994	Córdoba, Veracruz, Mexico	
5	Win	5–0	Herminio Flores	KO	2	28 Jun 1993	Xalapa, Veracruz, Mexico	
4	Win	4–0	Mario López	KO	3	20 Apr 1993	Minatitlán, Veracruz, Mexico	
3	Win	3–0	Julio César García	KO	2	19 Mar 1993	Xalapa, Veracruz, Mexico	
2	Win	2–0	Genaro Vázquez	KO	1	25 Feb 1993	Córdoba, Veracruz, Mexico	
1	Win	1–0	Juan Pina	KO	2	12 May 1992	Minatitlán, Veracruz, Mexico	

== See also ==
- List of bantamweight boxing champions
- List of Mexican boxing world champions

Achievements
Preceded by Mauricio Martínez	WBO bantamweight champion March 15, 2002 - May 7, 2004	Succeeded by Ratanachai Sor Vorapin
