= Danny Romero (boxer) =

American boxer

Personal information
- Nickname: Kid Dynamite
- Born: Daniel Gregorio Romero; July 12, 1974 (age 51) Albuquerque, New Mexico, U.S.
- Height: 5 ft 5 in (165 cm)
- Weight: Flyweight; Super flyweight; Bantamweight; Super bantamweight

Boxing career
- Reach: 68 in (173 cm)
- Stance: Orthodox

Boxing record
- Total fights: 52
- Wins: 45
- Win by KO: 38
- Losses: 5
- Draws: 2

Daniel Gregorio "Danny" Romero Jr. (born July 12, 1974) is an American former professional boxer who competed between 1992 and 2006. He is a world champion in two weight classes, having held the IBF flyweight title from 1995 to 1996 and the IBF junior bantamweight title from 1996 to 1997.

== Professional career ==
Romero's first fight as a professional was on September 14, 1992, when he knocked out Raul Hernandez in the first round at Phoenix, Arizona. His first eight bouts all took place in the Phoenix area, and he won all, seven by knockout. His first fight outside Phoenix was on April 13, 1993, when he knocked out Alberto Cantu in three rounds at Bay St. Louis, Mississippi. On May 22 of that year, he had his first professional fight in his hometown, Albuquerque New Mexico USA, knocking out Silverio Porras in two rounds.

Romero won five more bouts in a row, including a victory over former Alex Sanchez world title challenger Orlando Malone, before having his first chance to fight for a belt: On May 5, 1994, he knocked out Brian Lonon in two rounds to win the NABF regional Flyweight title. He retained the title four times, and added three non-title victories, before challenging for a world championship for the first time. On April 22, 1995, he became the IBF's world Flyweight champion with a twelve round unanimous decision over Francisco Tejedor, at the MGM Grand Arena, in Las Vegas. He defended the title once, then faced the unheralded Willy Salazar in a non-title bout, on September 8. Romero suffered a 7th round TKO loss to Salazar, in what Ring Magazine heralded as the "upset of the year" for 1995. In that fight he was ahead on all score cards before having the fight stopped due to an eye injury. He bounced back with a first round knockout victory over former WBO world Flyweight champion Jose Quirino.

Romero then decided to move up in weight division, to the Super Flyweight division. After one win in that division, he was given a chance at his second world championship. On August 24, 1996, Romero knocked out Colombian Harold Grey in two rounds to conquer his second world title. Even as he had lost to Salazar previously, interest in a fight between Romero and Johnny Tapia began to increase.

After winning two more fights, both times Romero retaining his world title by knockout, Romero and Tapia met to unify the IBF and WBO world Super Flyweight championships. On July 18, 1997, the long-awaited bout finally took place, with Tapia winning a close twelve round unanimous decision.

Romero won three fights in a row, then lost, on Halloween night, 1998 to Vuyani Bungu by a twelve round decision in an attempt to win a title in a third division, this time the IBF Super-Bantamweight title.

Romero would go on to win ten of his next twelve bouts, including a first round knockout over former world champion Rodolfo Blanco and a sixth round knockout over the respected Famosito Gomez. On September 27, 2002, Danny fought Cruz Carbajal but the fight was stopped by Romero's trainer, former world champion Eddie Mustafa Muhammad after round four due to an injury suffered in the first round.

On May 23, 2003, in front of his hometown crowd following a twelve round unanimous decision win over Trinidad Mendoza gave him his third world title in three different weight classes, winning the IBA's Super-Bantamweight title.

== Other achievements ==
Romero does occasional television jobs, specifically for the Showtime boxing network as well as commercials and movies. Developed his own promotional company called "Danny Romero Productions." The company promotes shows of any kind and currently has professional fighters signed to the company. A private boxing gym was purchased to provide his fighters with elite training. The gym prepares Danny as well as his pro fighters for possible upcoming events.

== Comeback ==
Romero Jr.'s father was stricken with a rare liver disorder, a form of cirrhosis that would kill him without a transplant. Inspired by his father's battle, Romero Jr. returned to the ring and, fighting for the first time in two years, was held to a majority draw by Alex Ali Baba (21-7-1) in an eight-round junior featherweight fight.

== Professional boxing record ==
52 fights	45 wins	5 losses
By knockout	38	2
By decision	7	3
Draws	2	

No.	Result	Record	Opponent	Type	Round, time	Date	Location	Notes
53	Win	45–5–2	Edgar Pedraza	TKO	4 (8), 2:16	Jul 1, 2006	Sky City Arena, Acoma, New Mexico, U.S.	
52	Draw	44–5–2	Alex Baba	MD	8	May 14, 2005	MGM Grand, Las Vegas, Nevada, U.S.	
50	Win	44–5–1	Trinidad Mendoza	UD	12	May 23, 2003	Sandia Casino, Albuquerque, New Mexico, U.S.	Won IBA junior featherweight title
49	Loss	43–5–1	Cruz Carbajal	RTD	4 (12), 3:00	Sep 27, 2002	Isleta Casino and Resorts, Albuquerque, New Mexico, U.S.	For WBO bantamweight title
48	Win	43–4–1	Domingo Guillen	KO	1 (12)	Jul 19, 2002	Isleta Casino and Resort, Albuquerque, New Mexico, U.S.	Retained NABA bantamweight title
47	Win	42–4–1	Cuauhtemoc Gomez	TKO	7 (12)	Jun 1, 2002	Isleta Casino and Resort, Albuquerque, New Mexico, U.S.	Won vacant NABA bantamweight title
46	Loss	41–4–1	Ratanachai Sor Vorapin	MD	10	Sep 29, 2001	Madison Square Garden, New York City, New York, U.S.	
45	Win	41–3–1	Arman Pedemonte	TKO	4 (?)	Nov 25, 2000	Artesia, New Mexico, U.S.	
44	Win	40–3–1	Jorge Alberto Reyes	RTD	2 (10), 3:00	Oct 7, 2000	MGM Grand, Las Vegas, Nevada, U.S.	
43	Win	39–3–1	Jorge Munoz	UD	12	May 6, 2000	Pan American Center, Las Cruces, New Mexico, U.S.	Won WBO-NABO junior featherweight title
42	Win	38–3–1	Adarryl Johnson	TKO	5 (10), 0:50	Mar 4, 2000	Mandalay Bay Resort and Casino, Las Vegas, Nevada, U.S.	
41	Win	37–3–1	Rodolfo Blanco	KO	1 (10), 0:56	Jan 8, 2000	University Arena, Albuquerque, New Mexico, U.S.	
40	Win	36–3–1	Richard Dinkins	TKO	1 (8), 2:18	Dec 4, 1999	Equestrian Center, El Paso, Texas, U.S.	
39	Win	35–3–1	Leonardo Gutierrez	KO	6 (10), 2:25	Aug 14, 1999	Convention Center, Albuquerque, New Mexico, U.S.	
38	Draw	34–3–1	Enrique Jupiter	SD	10	Jun 11, 1999	Texas Motor Speedway, Fort Worth, Texas, U.S.	
37	Win	34–3	David Vazquez	UD	10	May 8, 1999	Hilton Hotel, Las Vegas, Nevada, U.S.	
36	Loss	33–3	Vuyani Bungu	MD	12	Oct 31, 1998	Convention Center, Atlantic City, New Jersey, U.S.	For IBF junior featherweight title
35	Win	33–2	Tomas Cordoba	KO	1 (10), 2:25	Jul 19, 1998	Lake Charles, Louisiana, U.S.	
34	Win	32–2	Joe Manzani	UD	10	Feb 24, 1998	Foxwoods Resort, Mashantucket, Connecticut, U.S.	
33	Win	31–2	Roberto Lopez	KO	5 (10), 1:38	Nov 25, 1997	County Coliseum, El Paso, Texas, U.S.	
32	Loss	30–2	Johnny Tapia	UD	12	Jul 18, 1997	Thomas & Mack Center, Las Vegas, Nevada, U.S.	Lost IBF super flyweight title; For WBO super flyweight title
31	Win	30–1	Jaji Sibali	KO	6 (12), 2:34	Mar 8, 1997	Convention Center, Albuquerque, New Mexico, U.S.	Retained IBF super flyweight title
30	Win	29–1	Hipolito Saucedo	TKO	12 (12), 1:01	Nov 1, 1996	Fantasy Springs Casino, Indio, California, U.S.	Retained IBF super flyweight title
29	Win	28–1	Harold Grey	KO	2 (12), 1:25	Aug 24, 1996	University Arena, Albuquerque, New Mexico, U.S.	Won IBF super flyweight title
28	Win	27–1	Esteban Ayala	TKO	3 (10), 1:41	May 30, 1996	Houston, Texas, U.S.	
27	Win	26–1	José Quirino	KO	1 (10)	Feb 27, 1996	Tingley Coliseum, Albuquerque, New Mexico, U.S.	
26	Loss	25–1	Willy Salazar	RTD	7 (10), 3:00	Sep 8, 1995	The Aladdin, Las Vegas, Nevada, U.S.	
25	Win	25–0	Miguel Martinez	KO	6 (12), 1:15	Jul 29, 1995	Freeman Coliseum, San Antonio, Texas, U.S.	
24	Win	24–0	Francisco Tejedor	UD	12	Apr 22, 1995	MGM Grand, Las Vegas, Nevada, U.S.	Won IBF flyweight title
23	Win	23–0	Javier Cintron	KO	3 (10), 2:59	Feb 10, 1995	University Arena, Albuquerque, New Mexico, U.S.	
22	Win	22–0	Andres Cazares	KO	1 (10), 1:25	Dec 8, 1994	Convention Center, Albuquerque, New Mexico, U.S.	
21	Win	21–0	Domingo Sosa	TKO	1 (12), 1:06	Nov 18, 1994	MGM Grand, Las Vegas, Nevada, U.S.	Retained NABA super flyweight title
20	Win	20–0	Marcos Pechco	RTD	6 (12), 3:00	Oct 12, 1994	University Arena, Albuquerque, New Mexico, U.S.	Won vacant NABA super flyweight title
19	Win	19–0	Manuel Jesus Herrera	TKO	12 (12), 2:56	Sep 9, 1994	Olympic Auditorium, Los Angeles, California, U.S.	Retained NABA flyweight title
18	Win	18–0	Facundo Rodriguez	TKO	1 (10), 2:50	Aug 3, 1994	Tingley Coliseum, Albuquerque, New Mexico, U.S.	
17	Win	17–0	Hugo Torres	TKO	6 (12), 2:59	May 27, 1994	MGM Grand Garden Arena, Las Vegas, Nevada, U.S.	Retained NABA flyweight title
16	Win	16–0	Brian Lonon	TKO	2 (12), 2:59	May 5, 1994	Olympic Auditorium, Los Angeles, California, U.S.	Won vacant NABA flyweight title
15	Win	15–0	Elidio Dominguez	KO	3 (10), 2:42	Feb 9, 1994	Tingley Coliseum, Albuquerque, New Mexico, U.S.	
14	Win	14–0	Armando Diaz	TKO	9 (10), 0:42	Jan 9, 1994	Bing Crosby Hall At Del Mar Fairgrounds, Del Mar, California, U.S.	
13	Win	13–0	Juan Gabriel Cortes	TKO	1 (8)	Nov 30, 1993	Tingley Coliseum, Albuquerque, New Mexico, U.S.	
12	Win	12–0	Orlando Malone	TKO	5 (10), 2:24	Aug 9, 1993	Convention Center, Albuquerque, New Mexico, U.S.	
11	Win	11–0	Manuel Robles	UD	6	Jun 19, 1993	Summit, Houston, Texas, U.S.	
10	Win	10–0	Silverio Porras	TKO	2 (12), 2:4	May 22, 1993	Kiva Auditorium, Albuquerque, New Mexico, U.S.	Won New Mexico state super flyweight title
9	Win	9–0	Alberto Cantu	TKO	3 (6), 2:42	Apr 13, 1993	Casino Magic, Bay Saint Louis, Mississippi, U.S.	
8	Win	8–0	Aureo Dominguez	TKO	5 (6)	Feb 16, 1993	Veteran's Memorial Coliseum, Phoenix, Arizona, U.S.	
7	Win	7–0	Oscar Jimenez	KO	1 (4)	Jan 15, 1993	Camelback Resort, Scottsdale, Arizona, U.S.	
6	Win	6–0	Andres Aguilar	UD	4	Oct 27, 1992	Veteran's Memorial Coliseum, Phoenix, Arizona, U.S.	
5	Win	5–0	Ruben Luzaniacla	TKO	2 (4)	Oct 2, 1992	Wyndam Resort, Scottsdale, Arizona, U.S.	
4	Win	4–0	Eduardo Avalos	KO	1 (4), 0:32	Sep 16, 1992	Phoenix, Arizona, U.S.	
3	Win	3–0	Alfredo Torrez	TKO	1 (4), 1:52	Aug 29, 1992	Celebrity Theater, Phoenix, Arizona, U.S.	
2	Win	2–0	Mauro Betancourt	TKO	1 (4), 0:35	Aug 18, 1992	Red Lion Inn and Casino, Elko, Nevada, U.S.	
1	Win	1–0	Raul Hernandez	KO	1 (4), 1:12	Aug 14, 1992	Omni Hotel, Phoenix, Arizona, U.S.	

== See also ==
- List of flyweight boxing champions
- List of super-flyweight boxing champions

Sporting positions
World boxing titles
Preceded by Francisco Tejedor	IBF flyweight champion April 22, 1995 - January 1, 1996; Vacated	Vacant Title next held by Mark Johnson
Preceded by Harold Grey	IBF super flyweight champion August 24, 1996 - July 18, 1997	Succeeded by Johnny Tapia
