= Wethya Sakmuangklang =

Thai boxer

Personal information
- Nationality: Thai (Thailand)
- Born: Foijan Prawet; 6 July 1976 (age 50) Krasang, Buriram Province, Thailand
- Weight: super bantamweight

Boxing career
- Stance: southpaw

Boxing record
- Total fights: 83
- Wins: 77
- Win by KO: 46
- Losses: 6
- Draws: 0
- No contests: 0

Foijan Prawet, who boxes as Wethya Sakmuangklang, (born 6 July 1976 in Buriram Province, Thailand) is a Thai professional boxer who fights at super bantamweight.

He was a former OPBF super bantamweight champion.

He got knocked out by Manny Pacquiao in the 6th round.

== Professional boxing record ==
84 fights	78 wins	6 losses
By knockout	46	3
By decision	32	3

No.	Result	Record	Opponent	Type	Round, time	Date	Location	Notes
84	Loss	78–6	Yūta Nagai	TKO	7 (10), 0:52	27 Nov 2009	Edogawa Sports Center, Tokyo, Japan	
83	Loss	78–5	Rolly Lunas	SD	12	11 Jan 2009	City Sogo Gym, Kanazawa, Thailand	Lost OPBF super bantamweight title
82	Win	78–4	Jun Talape	SD	12	5 Sep 2008	Banchiang, Nong Han, Thailand	Retained OPBF super bantamweight title
81	Win	77–4	Boonme Thamasorn	KO	2 (6)	1 May 2008	Rajadamnern Stadium, Bangkok, Thailand	
80	Win	76–4	Mongkolchai Sithmakamwan	TKO	5 (6)	23 Mar 2008	Rajadamnern Stadium, Bangkok, Thailand	
79	Win	75–4	Payator Twins Special	KO	2 (6)	4 Feb 2008	Rajadamnern Stadium, Bangkok, Thailand	
78	Win	74–4	Sor Sor Veerapol	PTS	6	4 Nov 2007	Rajadamnern Stadium, Bangkok, Thailand	
77	Win	73–4	Sot Sor Veerapol	PTS	6	19 Aug 2007	Rajadamnern Stadium, Bangkok, Thailand	
76	Win	72–4	Kyōhei Tamakoshi	UD	12	3 Jun 2007	Sambo Hall, Kobe, Japan	Retained OPBF super bantamweight title
75	Win	71–4	Hurricane Futa	UD	12	1 Apr 2007	Sangyo Hall, Kanazawa, Japan	Retained OPBF super bantamweight title
74	Win	70–4	Klachana Jockygym	PTS	6	24 Jan 2007	Rajadamnern Stadium, Bangkok, Thailand	
73	Win	69–4	Hiroki Sakamoto	UD	12	31 Aug 2006	Perefectural Gymnasium, Osaka, Japan	Retained OPBF super bantamweight title
72	Win	68–4	Achhan Buahom	UD	6	29 Jun 2006	Rajadamnern Stadium, Bangkok, Thailand	
71	Win	67–4	Simson Butar Butar	TKO	2 (10), 2:17	13 Apr 2006	Wat Suratrangsan, Pathum Thani, Thailand	
70	Win	66–4	Abbas Amami	KO	2 (6)	12 Jan 2006	Chaiyaphum, Chaiyaphum Province, Thailand	
69	Win	65–4	Yasuo Kunimi	MD	12	9 Oct 2005	Sangyo Hall, Kanazawa, Japan	Retained OPBF super bantamweight title
68	Win	64–4	Masakazu Sugawara	TKO	3 (12), 2:00	26 Jun 2005	Aichi Prefectural Gymnasium, Nagoya, Japan	Won OPBF super bantamweight title
67	Win	63–4	Charandech Por Fahkamron	KO	1 (6)	7 Apr 2005	Rajadamnern Stadium, Bangkok, Thailand	
66	Win	62–4	Achhan Buahom	UD	6	22 Feb 2005	Chaophraya pier, Pathum Thani, Thailand	
65	Win	61–4	Amorn Longsiriphoom	TKO	4 (6)	6 Jan 2005	Rajadamnern Stadium, Bangkok, Thailand	
64	Win	60–4	Amorn Longsiriphoom	UD	6	9 Sep 2004	Chumphon, Chumphon Province, Thailand	
63	Win	59–4	Nathan Barcelona	TKO	3 (6)	29 Jul 2004	Pakchong, Nakhon Ratchasima, Thailand	
62	Win	58–4	Amorn Longsiriphoom	KO	5 (6)	9 Jun 2004	Rajadamnern Stadium, Bangkok, Thailand	
61	Win	57–4	Tanathep Sithsei	KO	1 (10)	18 Mar 2004	Rajadamnern Stadium, Bangkok, Thailand	Retained Thai super bantamweight title
60	Win	56–4	Orlando Padillo	TKO	5 (6)	25 Feb 2004	Samut Sakhon, Samut Sakhon Province, Thailand	
59	Win	55–4	Michael Domingo	UD	6	25 Nov 2003	Pathum Thani, Pathum Thani Province, Thailand	
58	Win	54–4	Kaithong Sithsaithong	KO	2 (6)	6 Nov 2003	Rajadamnern Stadium, Bangkok, Thailand	
57	Win	53–4	Phongpetch Muangsurin	UD	6	6 Aug 2003	Rajadamnern Stadium, Bangkok, Thailand	
56	Win	52–4	Refly Rengkuang	UD	6	26 Jun 2003	Nan, Nan Province, Thailand	
55	Win	51–4	Phongpetch Muangsurin	UD	6	12 May 2003	Rajadamnern Stadium, Bangkok, Thailand	
54	Win	50–4	Alex Escaner	UD	8	7 Mar 2003	Nakhon Sawan, Nakhon Sawan Province, Thailand	
53	Win	49–4	Dechdamrong Pormuangaurin	UD	6	13 Dec 2002	Nakhon Sawan, Nakhon Sawan Province, Thailand	
52	Win	48–4	Elwis Guamiki	UD	6	3 Oct 2002	Dan Khun Thot, Nakhon Ratchasima, Thailand	
51	Win	47–4	Vichit Chuwatana	UD	10	30 Aug 2002	Thongsuk College, Bangkok, Thailand	Won vacant Thai super bantamweight title
50	Win	46–4	Virgo Warouw	PTS	10	2 Feb 2002	Indonesia	
49	Win	45–4	Mohammad Nurhuda	TKO	2 (10)	21 Nov 2001	Bangkok, Thailand	Retained WBC-ABCO super bantamweight title
48	Win	44–4	Steven Togelang	TKO	5 (10)	19 Sep 2001	Nonthaburi, Nonthaburi Province, Thailand	Won inaugural WBC-ABCO super bantamweight title
47	Win	43–4	Clinton Simmonds	KO	2 (10)	13 Jul 2001	Nonthaburi, Nonthaburi Province, Thailand	
46	Win	42–4	Ramil Sebuco	KO	3 (10)	23 May 2001	Bangkok, Thailand	
45	Loss	41–4	Manny Pacquiao	KO	6 (12), 2:40	28 Apr 2001	Kidapawan, Cotabato, Philippines	For WBC International super bantamweight title
44	Win	41–3	Muhammad Alfaridzi	KO	10	10 Jan 2001	Jakarta, Indonesia	
43	Win	40–3	Julius Baga	PTS	10	5 Dec 2000	Royal Promenade-Sanam Luang, Bangkok, Thailand	
42	Win	39–3	Andy Alagenio	KO	6	20 Sep 2000	Bangkok, Thailand	
41	Loss	38–3	Guty Espadas Jr.	UD	12	23 Jun 2000	Polforum Zamná, Mérida, Mexico	For WBC featherweight title
40	Win	38–2	Kongpetch Sithnaruepol	KO	2	24 May 2000	Bangkok, Thailand	
39	Win	37–2	Singsamai Nakornnakam	KO	6	17 Apr 2000	Bangkok, Thailand	
38	Win	36–2	Remil Sebuco	KO	3	11 Feb 2000	Mahachai Villa Arena, Samut Sakhon, Thailand	
37	Win	35–2	Edwin Gastador	UD	8	15 Dec 1999	Bangkok, Thailand	
36	Win	34–2	Ramil Sebuco	KO	2	20 Oct 1999	Bangkok, Thailand	
35	Win	33–2	Erny Orhanisa	KO	6	18 Aug 1999	Bangkok, Thailand	
34	Win	32–2	Jojo Arnado	TKO	2 (10)	16 Jun 1999	Bangkok, Thailand	
33	Win	31–2	Ballast Saktawee	PTS	6	13 May 1999	Bangkok, Thailand	
32	Win	30–2	Roongsurin Lookongchan	KO	6	17 Mar 1999	Bangkok, Thailand	
31	Win	29–2	Erny Orhanisa	PTS	10	16 Dec 1998	Bangkok, Thailand	
30	Win	28–2	Ballast Saktawee	PTS	6	12 Nov 1998	Bangkok, Thailand	
29	Win	27–2	Jana Thai Japan Gym	KO	2	21 Oct 1998	Bangkok, Thailand	
28	Win	26–2	Somyong Kiattorbor ubon	KO	4	30 Sep 1998	Bangkok, Thailand	
27	Win	25–2	Seemork Sithmurasak	KO	2	9 Sep 1998	Bangkok, Thailand	
26	Win	24–2	Ballast Saktawee	KO	5	17 Aug 1998	Bangkok, Thailand	
25	Win	23–2	Jana Thai Japan Gym	KO	4	22 Jul 1998	Bangkok, Thailand	
24	Win	22–2	Ballast Saktawee	PTS	6	17 Jun 1998	Bangkok, Thailand	
23	Win	21–2	Montree Sorkettalingchan	KO	6	27 May 1998	Bangkok, Thailand	
22	Win	20–2	Vihok Jockygym	PTS	6	22 Apr 1998	Bangkok, Thailand	
21	Win	19–2	Vihok Jockygym	PTS	6	18 Feb 1998	Bangkok, Thailand	
20	Win	18–2	Kanongdech Saknarin	KO	2	26 Nov 1997	Bangkok, Thailand	
19	Loss	17–2	Sukhbayar Nemekbayar	KO	5 (10)	23 Oct 1997	Phraram 9 Plaza, Bangkok, Thailand	
18	Win	17–1	Wisetsuk Thavatchai	KO	3	8 Sep 1997	Bangkok, Thailand	
17	Win	16–1	Sann Sithnarupol	KO	4 (10)	20 Aug 1997	Channel 7 Studios, Bangkok, Thailand	Won vacant Thai bantamweight title
16	Win	15–1	Kongpetch Sithnaruepol	KO	2	6 Aug 1997	Rajadamnern Stadium, Bangkok, Thailand	
15	Win	14–1	Chaiyaphum Jockygym	KO	4	9 Jul 1997	Bangkok, Thailand	
14	Win	13–1	Goyong Jockygym	KO	3	16 Jun 1997	Bangkok, Thailand	
13	Win	12–1	Sann Sithnarupol	KO	4 (6)	21 Apr 1997	Rajadamnern Stadium, Bangkok, Thailand	
12	Win	11–1	Nonsawan Blueskygym	KO	1 (6)	24 Mar 1997	Rajadamnern Stadium, Bangkok, Thailand	
11	Win	10–1	Silapadej Jockygym	KO	2	5 Feb 1997	Bangkok, Thailand	
10	Win	9–1	Nuopetch Sithnaruepol	KO	1	8 Jan 1997	Bangkok, Thailand	
9	Win	8–1	Satorn Sithfahkamrom	PTS	1	4 Dec 1996	Bangkok, Thailand	
8	Win	7–1	Denjana Monthonsibtid	TKO	3	6 Nov 1996	Bangkok, Thailand	
7	Win	6–1	Sann Sithnarupol	KO	3 (6)	2 Oct 1996	Rajadamnern Stadium, Bangkok, Thailand	
6	Win	5–1	Fon Fuji	TKO	3 (6)	10 Jul 1996	Rajadamnern Stadium, Bangkok, Thailand	
5	Win	4–1	Sann Sithnarupol	KO	1	17 Jun 1996	Bangkok, Thailand	
4	Win	3–1	Niyomthai Eosampan	PTS	6	8 May 1996	Bangkok, Thailand	
3	Loss	2–1	Nolito Cabato	PTS	10	11 Mar 1996	Tokyo, Japan	
2	Win	2–0	Wanchana Sor Sawatwaree	PTS	6	14 Feb 1996	Bangkok, Thailand	
1	Win	1–0	Sok Sorphumsak	PTS	4	15 Aug 1993	Bangkok, Thailand	
