= Lehlo Ledwaba =

South African boxer (1971–2021)

Personal information
- Nickname: Hands of Stone
- Born: Lehlohonolo Benedict Ledwaba; 27 July 1971 Soweto, Transvaal (now Gauteng), South Africa
- Died: 2 July 2021 (aged 49)
- Height: 5 ft 5 in (165 cm)
- Weight: Bantamweight; Super bantamweight; Featherweight; Super featherweight

Boxing career
- Reach: 69 in (175 cm)
- Stance: Orthodox

Boxing record
- Total fights: 43
- Wins: 36
- Win by KO: 23
- Losses: 6
- Draws: 1

Lehlohonolo Benedict Ledwaba (27 July 1971 – 2 July 2021) was a South African professional boxer who competed from 1990 to 2006, and held the IBF super bantamweight title from 1999 to 2001.

Ledwaba died from COVID-19 on 2 July 2021, at age 49.

== Professional career ==
Ledwaba turned pro in 1990 and in 1999 captured the vacant IBF super bantamweight title with a decision victory over John Michael Johnson. Ledwaba defended the belt 5 times before losing it to Manny Pacquiao via TKO to earn Pacquiao his second world championship in two weight divisions. Ledwaba continued to fight, but has never challenged for a major title since the loss. He retired from boxing after his loss to Maxwell Awuku on 24 November 2006.

== Professional boxing record ==
43 fights	36 wins	6 losses
By knockout	23	3
By decision	13	3
Draws	1	

No.	Result	Record	Opponent	Type	Round, time	Date	Location	Notes
43	Loss	36–6–1	Maxwell Awuku	RTD	9 (12)	24 Nov 2006	Convention Centre, Mafikeng, South Africa	Lost WBA Pan African super-featherweight title
42	Win	36–5–1	Ephraim Nangenda	TKO	6 (12)	8 Apr 2006	Standard Bank Arena, Johannesburg, South Africa	Won vacant WBA Pan African super-featherweight title
41	Loss	35–5–1	Cassius Baloyi	UD	12	16 Apr 2005	Carnival City, Brakpan, South Africa	For IBO featherweight title
40	Loss	35–4–1	Cassius Baloyi	UD	12	20 Nov 2004	Carnival City, Brakpan, South Africa	For IBO featherweight title
39	Loss	35–3–1	Spend Abazi	UD	12	11 Jun 2004	K.B. Hallen, Copenhagen, Denmark	For EBA featherweight title
38	Win	35–2–1	Choi Tseveenpurev	MD	10	13 Mar 2004	Brøndby Hall, Brøndby, Denmark	
37	Win	34–2–1	Vuyani Bungu	UD	12	27 Jul 2002	Carnival City, Brakpan, South Africa	Won vacant WBU featherweight title
36	Loss	33–2–1	Manny Pacquiao	TKO	6 (12), 0:59	23 Jun 2001	MGM Grand Garden Arena, Paradise, Nevada, US	Lost IBF super-bantamweight title
35	Win	33–1–1	Carlos Contreras	UD	12	22 Apr 2001	Carnival City, Brakpan, South Africa	Retained IBF super-bantamweight title
34	Win	32–1–1	Arnel Barotillo	TKO	9 (12), 2:40	17 Feb 2001	Carnival City, Brakpan, South Africa	Retained IBF super-bantamweight title
33	Win	31–1–1	Eduardo Enrique Alvarez	KO	8 (12), 2:48	6 Oct 2000	Leisure Centre, Maidstone, England	Retained IBF super-bantamweight title
32	Win	30–1–1	Ernesto Grey	TKO	8 (12), 1:20	7 Apr 2000	Whitchurch Sports Centre, Bristol, England	Retained IBF super-bantamweight title
31	Win	29–1–1	Edison Valencia Diaz	TKO	5 (12), 2:31	25 Sep 1999	Pechanga Resort & Casino, Temecula, California, US	Retained IBF super-bantamweight title
30	Win	28–1–1	John Michael Johnson	UD	12	29 May 1999	Carousel Casino, Hammanskraal, South Africa	Won vacant IBF super-bantamweight title
29	Win	27–1–1	Maxim Pugachev	KO	2 (10)	6 Feb 1999	Carousel Casino, Hammanskraal, South Africa	
28	Win	26–1–1	Peter Buckley	PTS	8	5 Dec 1998	Whitchurch Sports Centre, Bristol, England	
27	Win	25–1–1	Arnel Barotillo	UD	10	22 Aug 1998	Carousel Casino, Hammanskraal, South Africa	
26	Win	24–1–1	Zukile Filani	KO	3 (12), 1:12	25 Mar 1998	Nasrec Indoor Arena, Johannesburg, South Africa	Retained South African super-bantamweight title
25	Win	23–1–1	Entwa Mofokeng	TKO	2 (12)	7 Dec 1997	Fred Crookes Technikon Hall, Durban, South Africa	Retained South African super-bantamweight title
24	Win	22–1–1	Luyanda Mini	TKO	4 (12)	21 Jun 1997	Nasrec Indoor Arena, Johannesburg, South Africa	Retained South African super-bantamweight title
23	Win	21–1–1	Gian Maria Petriccioli	UD	12	9 Mar 1997	Nasrec Indoor Arena, Johannesburg, South Africa	Retained WBU bantamweight title
22	Win	20–1–1	Cruz Carbajal	UD	12	17 Nov 1996	Nasrec Indoor Arena, Johannesburg, South Africa	Won vacant WBU bantamweight title
21	Win	19–1–1	Vuyisile Tinga	KO	1 (12)	7 Jul 1996	Don Mateman Hall, Johannesburg, South Africa	Retained South African super-bantamweight title
20	Win	18–1–1	Ric Siodora	UD	10	7 Apr 1996	Wembley Indoor Arena, Johannesburg, South Africa	
19	Win	17–1–1	Ricky Beard	TKO	3 (10)	18 Nov 1995	Kelvin Hall, Glasgow, Scotland	
18	Win	16–1–1	Matthew Harris	KO	2 (10)	26 Aug 1995	Village Green, Durban, South Africa	
17	Win	15–1–1	Juan Polo Perez	SD	10	6 May 1995	Village Green, Durban, South Africa	
16	Win	14–1–1	Ncedile Siko	RTD	7 (12)	22 Jan 1995	City Hall, Durban, South Africa	Won vacant South African super-bantamweight title
15	Win	13–1–1	June Siko	TKO	6 (6)	4 Sep 1994	Gold Reef City Entertainment Centre, Johannesburg, South Africa	
14	Win	12–1–1	Barry Brown	TKO	2 (4)	13 Mar 1994	Don Mateman Hall, Johannesburg, South Africa	
13	Win	11–1–1	Elias Sebesho	PTS	6	4 Dec 1993	Superbowl, Sun City, South Africa	
12	Loss	10–1–1	Joseph Ramaswe	TKO	2 (6)	24 Jul 1993	Standard Bank Arena, Johannesburg, South Africa	
11	Win	10–0–1	Vusi Khoza	TKO	4 (10)	2 Jun 1993	Don Mateman Hall, Johannesburg, South Africa	Retained Transvaal super-bantamweight title
10	Win	9–0–1	Moses Petersen	TKO	3 (6)	4 Apr 1993	Indoor Centre, Springs, South Africa	
9	Win	8–0–1	Derek Veejam	KO	1 (4)	10 Feb 1993	City Hall, Durban, South Africa	
8	Win	7–0–1	Vusi Khoza	KO	4 (10)	11 Oct 1992	Nasrec Indoor Arena, Johannesburg, South Africa	Won Transvaal super-bantamweight title
7	Win	6–0–1	Moses Petersen	PTS	6	12 Apr 1992	Nasrec Indoor Arena, Johannesburg, South Africa	
6	Win	5–0–1	Malepa Levi	PTS	4	16 Feb 1992	Nasrec Indoor Arena, Johannesburg, South Africa	
5	Win	4–0–1	Robert Kgaswe	TKO	4 (6)	24 Nov 1991	Nasrec Indoor Arena, Johannesburg, South Africa	
4	Draw	3–0–1	Andrew Nemutaka	PTS	2 (6)	22 Sep 1991	Nasrec Indoor Arena, Johannesburg, South Africa	
3	Win	3–0	David Moshodi	TKO	2 (6)	23 Jun 1991	Nasrec Indoor Arena, Johannesburg, South Africa	
2	Win	2–0	Joseph Motsamai	TKO	1 (4)	24 Mar 1991	Nasrec Indoor Arena, Johannesburg, South Africa	
1	Win	1–0	Ephraim Madi	TKO	4 (6)	31 Oct 1990	Don Mateman Hall, Johannesburg, South Africa	Professional debut

Sporting positions
Regional boxing titles
Vacant Title last held by Vuyani Bungu	South African super-bantamweight champion 22 January 1995 – 1999; Vacated	Vacant Title next held by Charles Mailula
Vacant Title last held by Anthony Tshehla	WBA Pan African super-featherweight champion 8 April 2006 – 24 November 2006	Succeeded by Maxwell Awuku
Minor world boxing titles
Vacant Title last held by Sirimongkol Singwangcha	WBU bantamweight champion 17 November 1996 – June 1997; Vacated	Vacant Title next held by Patrick Quka
Vacant Title last held by Cassius Baloyi	WBU featherweight champion 27 July 2002 – June 2004; Vacated	Vacant Title next held by Stephen Foster
Major world boxing titles
Vacant Title last held by Vuyani Bungu	IBF super-bantamweight champion 29 May 1999 – 23 June 2001	Succeeded by Manny Pacquiao
