= Mauricio Martínez (boxer) =

Panamanian boxer

Mauricio Martinez
Personal information
- Nickname: Nañara / Cry Baby
- Born: Mauricio Martinez Aguirre; May 20, 1975 (age 51) Colón, Panama
- Height: 5 ft 6 in (168 cm)
- Weight: Bantamweight; Super bantamweight; Featherweight

Boxing career
- Reach: 66 in (168 cm)
- Stance: Southpaw

Boxing record
- Total fights: 51
- Wins: 36
- Win by KO: 24
- Losses: 14
- Draws: 1
- No contests: 0

Mauricio Martínez Aguirre (born May 20, 1975 in Colón ) is a former Panamanian bantamweight boxer .

== Boxing career ==
In 1995 Martínez successfully started his professional career. On September 4, 2000, he boxed against Lester Fuentes for the vacant WBO world title and won by 5th round knockout. He made only one defence of his belt against Esham Pickering before losing the title to Mexican boxer Cruz Carbajal. He lost 6 of his last 7 fights and ended up retiring in 2012.

== See also ==
- List of bantamweight boxing champions

Achievements
Vacant Title last held by Johnny Tapia	WBO bantamweight champion September 4, 2000 - March 15, 2002	Succeeded by Cruz Carbajal
