= Vuyani Bungu =

South African boxer

Personal information
- Nicknames: The Beast; Carousel Kid
- Nationality: South African
- Born: 26 February 1967 (age 59) Mdantsane, Eastern Cape, South Africa
- Height: 1.66 m (5 ft 5 in)
- Weight: Super-bantamweight; Featherweight

Boxing career
- Reach: 168 cm (66 in)
- Stance: Orthodox

Boxing record
- Total fights: 44
- Wins: 39
- Win by KO: 19
- Losses: 5

Vuyani Bungu (born 26 February 1967) is a South African former professional boxer who competed from 1987 to 2005. He held the IBF junior-featherweight title from 1994 to 1999, and the IBO featherweight title from 2004 to 2005.

== Amateur Career ==
Bungu developed as an amateur boxer in Mdantsane under the guidance of his trainer Mzimasi Mnguni. He began training under Mnguni at the age of 15 and remained with him throughout his entire boxing career. Mnguni played an important role in developing Bungu as a fighter, he would later guide him towards a world title fight against Kennedy McKinney for his International Boxing Federation (IBF) Junior Featherweight title in 1994.

== Professional career ==
Bungu turned pro in 1987 and in 1994 captured the International Boxing Federation Super Bantamweight Title with a shocking upset victory over Kennedy McKinney, a fight named 1994 Ring Magazine Upset of the Year. After the victory, Bungu defended the title an impressive 13 times before relinquishing the belt in 2000 to move up to featherweight to take on Naseem Hamed. Hamed defeated the super bantamweight former champion, TKO'ing Bungu in the 4th round. In 2002, he was beaten by Lehlohonolo Ledwaba and retired in 2005 after losing to Thomas Mashaba. He compiled a career record of 39–5–0.

== Coaching and Community Work ==
Following his retirement in 2005, Bungu remained involved in the sport as a trainer. In 2006, he was seen helping his former trainer Mnguni coach other fellow boxers at the Eyethu Boxing Club in Mdantsane. Bungu expressed his concern about younger fighters leaving their townships for Johannesburg in search for better opportunities, he argued that their departure robbed younger boxers of local role models.

Bungu has also worked to encourage and mentor young boxers through the Vuyani Bungu Foundation. In March 2025, he visited young fighters at Mfuzo Boxing Club in Makhanda, where he spoke about his own career and the importance of discipline in boxing. He would encourage aspiring fighters to develop their own styles rather than trying to imitate other boxers.

== Professional boxing record ==
44 fights	39 wins	5 losses
By knockout	19	1
By decision	20	4

No.	Result	Record	Opponent	Type	Round, time	Date	Location	Notes
44	Loss	39–5	Thomas Mashaba	UD	12	25 Jun 2005	ABSA Stadium, East London, South Africa	Lost IBO featherweight title
43	Win	39–4	Takalani Ndlovu	SD	12	7 Feb 2004	Carnival City, Brakpan, South Africa	Won vacant IBO featherweight title
42	Win	38–4	Takalani Ndlovu	SD	10	31 May 2003	Carnival City, Brakpan, South Africa	
41	Loss	37–4	Lehlohonolo Ledwaba	UD	12	27 Jul 2002	Carnival City, Brakpan, South Africa	For vacant WBU featherweight title
40	Loss	37–3	Naseem Hamed	TKO	4 (12), 1:38	11 Mar 2000	London Olympia, London, England	For WBO featherweight title
39	Win	37–2	Victor Llerena	RTD	7 (12)	6 Feb 1999	Carousel Casino, Hammanskraal, South Africa	Retained IBF super-bantamweight title
38	Win	36–2	Danny Romero	MD	12	31 Oct 1998	Boardwalk Hall, Atlantic City, New Jersey, US	Retained IBF super-bantamweight title
37	Win	35–2	Ernesto Grey	SD	12	16 May 1998	Carousel Casino, Hammanskraal, South Africa	Retained IBF super-bantamweight title
36	Win	34–2	Arnel Barotillo	UD	12	15 Nov 1997	Carousel Casino, Hammanskraal, South Africa	Retained IBF super-bantamweight title
35	Win	33–2	Enrique Jupiter	UD	12	16 Aug 1997	Carousel Casino, Hammanskraal, South Africa	Retained IBF super-bantamweight title
34	Win	32–2	Kennedy McKinney	SD	12	5 Apr 1997	Carousel Casino, Hammanskraal, South Africa	Retained IBF super-bantamweight title
33	Win	31–2	Jesus Salud	UD	12	20 Aug 1996	Carousel Casino, Hammanskraal, South Africa	Retained IBF super-bantamweight title
32	Win	30–2	Pablo Osuna	TKO	2 (12), 0:39	15 Apr 1996	Carousel Casino, Hammanskraal, South Africa	Retained IBF super-bantamweight title
31	Win	29–2	Johnny Lewus	UD	12	23 Jan 1996	Grand Casino, Biloxi, Mississippi, US	Retained IBF super-bantamweight title
30	Win	28–2	Laureano Ramírez	UD	12	26 Sep 1995	Carousel Casino, Hammanskraal, South Africa	Retained IBF super-bantamweight title
29	Win	27–2	Victor Llerena	UD	12	29 Apr 1995	FNB Stadium, Johannesburg, South Africa	Retained IBF super-bantamweight title
28	Win	26–2	Mohammad Nurhuda	UD	12	4 Mar 1995	Carousel Casino, Hammanskraal, South Africa	Retained IBF super-bantamweight title
27	Win	25–2	Felix Camacho	UD	12	19 Nov 1994	Carousel Casino, Hammanskraal, South Africa	Retained IBF super-bantamweight title
26	Win	24–2	Kennedy McKinney	UD	12	20 Aug 1994	Carousel Casino, Hammanskraal, South Africa	Won IBF super-bantamweight title
25	Win	23–2	Jorge Lopez	TKO	6 (10), 2:01	16 Apr 1994	Convention Center, South Padre Island, Texas, US	
24	Win	22–2	June Siko	KO	3 (12)	29 Aug 1993	Orient Theatre, East London, South Africa	Retained South African super-bantamweight title
23	Win	21–2	Jorge Fuentes Martinez	TKO	1 (10)	17 Apr 1993	ARCO Arena, Sacramento, California, US	
22	Win	20–2	Sgigi Nekile	RTD	11 (12)	26 Sep 1992	Orient Theatre, East London, South Africa	Retained South African super-bantamweight title
21	Loss	19–2	Freddie Norwood	PTS	8	18 Apr 1992	Palazzetto dello Sport, Selvino, Italy	
20	Win	19–1	Mxolisi Mayekiso	TKO	4 (10)	6 Oct 1991	Orient Theatre, East London, South Africa	Retained South African super-bantamweight title
19	Win	18–1	Cirilo Ramon Figueredo	TKO	9 (10)	3 Aug 1991	Palazzetto dello Sport, Selvino, Italy	
18	Win	17–1	Lunga Dundu	TKO	9 (12)	2 Jun 1991	Orient Theatre, East London, South Africa	Retained South African super-bantamweight title
17	Win	16–1	Zolani Makhubalo	UD	12	4 Nov 1990	Orient Theatre, East London, South Africa	Retained South African super-bantamweight title
16	Win	15–1	Fransie Badenhorst	UD	12	13 May 1990	Orient Theatre, East London, South Africa	Won South African super-bantamweight title
15	Win	14–1	Andile Ntsiko	RTD	4 (10)	26 Nov 1989	Orient Theatre, East London, South Africa	Retained Cape super-bantamweight title
14	Loss	13–1	Fransie Badenhorst	UD	12	28 Aug 1989	Good Hope Centre, Cape Town, South Africa	For South African super-bantamweight title
13	Win	13–0	Zolani Makhubalo	RTD	7 (10)	30 Apr 1989	Feather Market Centre, Port Elizabeth, South Africa	Retained Cape super-bantamweight title
12	Win	12–0	Mabhongo Diko	TKO	9 (10)	5 Mar 1989	Orient Theatre, East London, South Africa	Retained Cape super-bantamweight title
11	Win	11–0	France Frans Mthembu	PTS	10	30 Jan 1989	Orient Theatre, East London, South Africa	
10	Win	10–0	Billy Mkenkcele	UD	10	23 Oct 1988	Orient Theatre, East London, South Africa	Retained Cape super-bantamweight title
9	Win	9–0	Xolani Bunu	TKO	2 (6)	25 Sep 1988	Orient Theatre, East London, South Africa	
8	Win	8–0	Velile Klaas	KO	3 (10)	11 Sep 1988	Civic Hall, Mdantsane, South Africa	Retained Cape super-bantamweight title
7	Win	7–0	Sexon Ngqayimbana	UD	10	5 Jun 1988	Orient Theatre, East London, South Africa	Won Cape super-bantamweight title
6	Win	6–0	Temba Gawula	KO	3 (6)	24 Apr 1988	City Hall, East London, South Africa	
5	Win	5–0	Wayne Van Wyk	TKO	2 (6)	4 Oct 1987	Feather Market Centre, Port Elizabeth, South Africa	
4	Win	4–0	Mbulelo Mfama	TKO	3 (4)	26 Jul 1987	Indoor Sports Centre, Uitenhage, South Africa	
3	Win	3–0	Luyanda Moleshe	PTS	4	20 Jun 1987	Civic Hall, Mdantsane, South Africa	
2	Win	2–0	Sakhiwo Manona	TKO	1 (4)	13 Jun 1987	New Brighton Centenary Hall, Port Elizabeth, South Africa	
1	Win	1–0	Xolela Makhuluma	TKO	4 (4)	26 Apr 1987	Mdantsane Stadium, Mdantsane, South Africa	

== Honours ==
Bungu was inducted into the South African Hall of Fame in the category of boxing.

Sporting positions
Regional boxing titles
Preceded by Fransie Badenhorst	South African super-bantamweight champion 13 May 1990 – January 1995; Vacated	Vacant Title next held by Lehlohonolo Ledwaba
Minor world boxing titles
Vacant Title last held by Michael Brodie	IBO featherweight champion 7 February 2004 – 25 June 2005	Succeeded by Thomas Mashaba
Major world boxing titles
Preceded by Kennedy McKinney	IBF super-bantamweight champion 4 August 1994 – 11 March 1999; Vacated	Succeeded by Lehlohonolo Ledwaba
